= List of Thunderbirds episodes =

This is an episode guide for Thunderbirds, a British Supermarionation television series produced by AP Films (later named Century 21 Productions) from 1964 and first broadcast on the ITV network in 1965 and 1966. It lists both the TV episodes and the 1960s audio plays by Century 21 Records, along with their adaptations.

Two feature film sequels to the TV series were released in 1966 and 1968, followed by three made-for-TV compilation films in the early 1980s. In 2015, a mini-series based on the three original audio stories was produced to mark the series' 50th anniversary.

All TV episodes were released on Region 2 DVD by Carlton in 2000 and 2001. A Region 1 box set by A&E Home Video followed in 2002. The episodes were released on Blu-ray Disc in 2008.

== Television series ==
=== Series 1 ===
Series 1 of Thunderbirds comprised 26 episodes, each approximately 50 minutes long. Episodes are listed in the official order published by distributor ITC Entertainment, which matches the order of production.

No. overall	No. in series	Title	Directed by	Written by	Original air date (ATV Midlands)
1	1	"Trapped in the Sky"	Alan Pattillo	Gerry and Sylvia Anderson	30 September 1965
The Fireflash, on its maiden flight from London to Tokyo, is sabotaged by the Hood, an Asian criminal who has learned of the formation of International Rescue, and is unable to land. The Hood's attack is intended to draw out International Rescue so he can record secrets of its machinery for sale to the highest bidder, an attempt thwarted by the intervention of the organization's London Agent.
2	2	"Pit of Peril"	Desmond Saunders	Alan Fennell	7 October 1965
A 500-ton U.S. Army walker, Sidewinder, falls into a pit during testing and International Rescue are called to save the crew trapped inside.
3	3	"City of Fire"	David Elliott	Alan Fennell	6 January 1966
The world's tallest tower catches fire following an explosion in the car park and International Rescue are called to rescue a family trapped in the basement, which they can accomplish only with an experimental cutting gas ("Oxyhydnite") that previously rendered Scott and Virgil Tracy unconscious during testing.
4	4	"Sun Probe"	David Lane	Alan Fennell	9 December 1965
The Sun Probe rocket and its crew are locked in a collision course with the Sun, prompting the launching of Thunderbird 3 – but International Rescue itself requires saving when Thunderbird 3 is unable to escape the Sun's gravitational pull.
5	5	"The Uninvited"	Desmond Saunders	Alan Fennell	2 December 1965
While returning to base, Scott is attacked by mysterious fighter aircraft and shot down over the Sahara. He is discovered by two archaeologists, who send him on his way, only to find themselves entombed within the lost Pyramid of Khamandides.
6	6	"The Mighty Atom"	David Lane	Dennis Spooner	30 December 1965
The Hood plans to corner the Thunderbirds vehicles by drawing them out to an emergency at an atomic irrigation plant in the Sahara, then photographing them with a miniature camera disguised as a mouse.
7	7	"Vault of Death"	David Elliott	Dennis Spooner	23 December 1965
During the installation of a new, airtight security vault at the Bank of England, one of the employees is accidentally locked inside, and International Rescue must come to his rescue before the air is extracted.
8	8	"Operation Crash-Dive"	Desmond Saunders	Martin Crump	16 December 1965
A series of unexplained Fireflash airliner disappearances sees Thunderbird 4 being called to rescue a crew stranded on the ocean floor. International Rescue then volunteer its services in helping to diagnose the cause of the mechanical fault.
9	9	"Move – and You're Dead"	Alan Pattillo	Alan Pattillo	10 February 1966
After Alan Tracy returns to motor-racing, his rivals decide to remove the competition by rigging a bridge with a movement-sensitive bomb, which will explode the moment that Alan and Grandma Tracy try to escape. (Some of this episode is narrated in flashback.)
10	10	"Martian Invasion"	David Elliott	Alan Fennell	17 March 1966
The Hood arranges for a mishap with explosives during a film shoot, leaving two of the actors sealed inside a cave. When International Rescue arrive the ensuing rescue is surreptitiously recorded by the Hood, and when the Tracys realize they've been set up a tense chase through the nearby desert ensues.
11	11	"Brink of Disaster"	David Lane	Alan Fennell	24 February 1966
An unscrupulous investor attempts to recruit Lady Penelope into funding his automated, cross-country monorail building project. Jeff volunteers to ride the prototype, but he, Brains, and Tin-Tin find themselves trapped onboard, and with no possibility of escape, when it is discovered that the monorail train is speeding towards a stricken bridge.
12	12	"The Perils of Penelope"	Alan Pattillo and Desmond Saunders	Alan Pattillo	14 October 1965
Lady Penelope goes on the trail of a kidnapped scientist, only to find herself in mortal danger at the hands of a megalomaniac determined to exploit the expert's work to his advantage.
13	13	"Terror in New York City"	David Elliott and David Lane	Alan Fennell	21 October 1965
While returning from a mission, Thunderbird 2 is seriously damaged when it comes under attack from a new, high-speed U.S. Navy strike vessel, the U.S.N. Sentinel. After an operation to move the Empire State Building disastrously ends in the tower's complete collapse, Jeff asks that Thunderbird 4 be transported onboard the same ship to the mouth of an underground river to reach a reporter and his cameraman who are trapped beneath the wreckage.
14	14	"End of the Road"	David Lane	Dennis Spooner	25 November 1965
International Rescue's security is jeopardised when Tin-Tin's close friend Eddie Houseman, who recently visited Tracy Island, takes drastic action to save his road-construction company's threatened contract by planting explosives to tear open a jungle mountainside, and the ensuing chaos leaves him trapped on a cliffside in a truck with another case of explosives on board.
15	15	"Day of Disaster"	David Elliott	Dennis Spooner	4 November 1965
The Allington Bridge collapses while a space rocket is being transported over it, trapping the rocket on the riverbed and inadvertently initiating its automatic countdown. International Rescue is called upon to save the crew before the rocket launches.
16	16	"Edge of Impact"	Desmond Saunders	Donald Robertson	28 October 1965
The Hood sabotages the Red Arrow aircraft programme. One of the planes crashes into the TV Tower in England during a brutal rain storm, and International Rescue is summoned to save the engineers inside the tower before it collapses; making their job trickier apart from the driving rain and winds at the site is that the Red Arrow's director, a long time friend of Jeff, is fired from the project and stays at Tracy Island, forcing the Tracys to draw him away and thus remain oblivious to International Rescue's existence.
17	17	"Desperate Intruder"	David Lane	Donald Robertson	18 November 1965
Brains and Tin-Tin set off on an expedition to retrieve sunken treasure from Lake Anasta. The Hood has also set his sights on the riches and plans to put both Brains and Tin-Tin in grave peril.
18	18	"30 Minutes After Noon"	David Elliott	Alan Fennell	11 November 1965
The Erdman Gang has developed an ingenious technique of having their work carried out – an explosive bracelet that can be removed only at the designated target. A secret agent's attempt to infiltrate the organisation backfires as he is left trapped in a plutonium store. International Rescue face a race against time to prevent a massive nuclear explosion.
19	19	"The Impostors"	Desmond Saunders	Dennis Spooner	13 January 1966
A gang of criminals masquerade as International Rescue to conceal their theft of top-secret military plans. The ensuing worldwide manhunt for International Rescue leaves the organisation powerless to operate in a rescue situation until its name is vindicated, just as a member of a crewed reconnaissance satellite is suddenly trapped in space while trying to repair the station.
20	20	"The Man from MI.5"	David Lane	Alan Fennell	20 January 1966
A criminal organisation steals classified plans. Working in conjunction with a British Secret Service agent, Lady Penelope must recover the material to save the world from total destruction.
21	21	"Cry Wolf"	David Elliott	Dennis Spooner	27 January 1966
Two Australian boys are playing their favourite game — "International Rescue" — when their "distress" call is picked up by John Tracy on Thunderbird 5. After a tour of Tracy Island, and a warning not to use their radio again, the brothers are returned home. The Hood then tricks the boys into an old mine shaft before stealing secret photographs from their government agent father. This time the brothers' SOS is real, but International Rescue refuses to believe them.
22	22	"Danger at Ocean Deep"	Desmond Saunders	Donald Robertson	3 February 1966
When the Ocean Pioneer tanker inexplicably explodes, Brains investigates the cause. With some help from Lady Penelope, he discovers it to be a chemical reaction between the cargo of liquid alsterene and OD60, which is found in the sea. International Rescue set out to save the crew of the ill-fated Ocean Pioneer II.
23	23	"The Duchess Assignment"	David Elliott	Martin Crump	17 February 1966
The Duchess of Royston has fallen on hard times, leading her friend Lady Penelope to enlist Jeff's help. The Duchess and her one asset – the painting Portrait of a Gazelle, by Braquasso – fall into criminal hands and it is up to International Rescue to save both.
24	24	"Attack of the Alligators!"	David Lane	Alan Pattillo	10 March 1966
When a new growth hormone is accidentally released into a South American river, a house is besieged by alligators – now many times their normal size. International Rescue must subdue the reptiles and save the house's occupants.
25	25	"The Cham-Cham"	Alan Pattillo	Alan Pattillo	24 March 1966
When aircraft are shot down during live broadcasts of a hit song, International Rescue suspects foul play. Tin-Tin and Lady Penelope (posing as the singer Wanda Lamour) investigate, but are left in mortal danger when an aerial tramway is sabotaged and speeds out of control down a mammoth mountain side in the Alps.
26	26	"Security Hazard"	Desmond Saunders	Alan Pattillo	31 March 1966
Clip show episode: the Tracy family cannot help but reminisce about their many successful missions after a young boy infiltrates the island. They are nevertheless burdened by the problem that the boy knows their identity and the location of their base – until Jeff realises that they can use the boy's dreams to their own advantage. Includes clips from "End of the Road", "Sun Probe", "Trapped in the Sky" and "Day of Disaster".

=== Series 2 ===
Series 2 comprised six 50-minute episodes. Episodes are listed in the official order published by distributor ITC Entertainment, which matches the order of production.

No. overall	No. in series	Title	Directed by	Written by	Original air date (ATV London)
27	1	"Atlantic Inferno"	Desmond Saunders	Alan Fennell	2 October 1966
World Navy tests of a nuclear torpedo inadvertently threaten the offshore rig Seascape. Jeff, having been invited by Lady Penelope to join her on holiday in Australia, places Scott in charge of International Rescue, with Alan substituting for Scott at the helm of Thunderbird 1. Jeff though is angered when Scott launches a rescue effort to the mid-ocean rig.
28	2	"Path of Destruction"	David Elliott	Donald Robertson	9 October 1966
A new invention – the Crablogger (a nearly fully automated logging machine that converts wood into fuel) — threatens widespread devastation if it collides with an unfinished dam, after its drivers collapse due to food poisoning.
29	3	"Alias Mr. Hackenbacker"	Desmond Saunders	Alan Pattillo	16 October 1966
The passenger aircraft Skythrust, conceived by Brains using the alias Hiram K. Hackenbacker, falls into the hands of fashion criminals who hi-jack the plane to steal a new French design from the renowned François Lemaire.
30	4	"Lord Parker's 'Oliday"	Brian Burgess	Tony Barwick	23 October 1966
A malfunctioning solar reflector menaces the Italian coastal village of Monte Bianco, where Lady Penelope and Parker happen to be visiting while on holiday.
31	5	"Ricochet"	Brian Burgess	Tony Barwick	6 November 1966
A staffed, pirate telecommunications satellite (which broadcasts a music programme of which Tin-Tin is a devoted fan) is disrupted by the detonation of a rogue uncrewed space rocket and is set on collision course with a Middle Eastern oil refinery. This episode was inspired by the offshore pirate radio stations such as Radio Caroline which were operating off the British coast in the 1960s.
32	6	"Give or Take a Million"	Desmond Saunders	Alan Pattillo	25 December 1966
While Christmas preparations are underway at both Tracy Island and a local children's hospital, which is expanding to incorporate a new radiotherapy wing, a pair of criminals attempt to burgle a high-tech vault storing gold bullion.

== Audio episodes ==
Between 1965 and 1967, Century 21 Records released 19 Thunderbirds audio plays in the form of 7-inch, 33 RPM vinyl EP records (promoted as "mini-albums"), each about 21 minutes long. Three of these were original stories; the rest were retellings of selected TV episodes, each condensed from the original soundtrack with added narration by one of the main characters. In 1990, revised versions of eight plays were broadcast as a mini-series on BBC Radio 5.

Of the original stories, voice actors Peter Dyneley, David Graham and Sylvia Anderson featured in all three, Ray Barrett in two and Shane Rimmer in one. Two of the stories – F.A.B. and The Stately Homes Robberies – were told from the point of view of Lady Penelope and Parker, and featured original music by Barry Gray. In 2015, the stories were adapted as screen episodes to mark Thunderbirds' 50th anniversary.

Denotes an original play

No.	Title	Cat. no.	Written by	Based on	Narrator (voiced by)	Original release date
1	"Introducing Thunderbirds"	MA 103	Alan Fennell	N/A	N/A	October 1965
This original story, written to introduce the series' premise, is about Lady Penelope's first visit to Tracy Island and serves as a prequel to "Trapped in the Sky".; Alternative title: "Introducing The Thunderbirds".; Re-released on Lady Penelope Presents (Century 21 LP compilation record, 1966, code LA 2), Gerry Anderson Presents T.V. Favourites – Vol. 1 (Marble Arch Records LP, 1968, MAL 770), and on CD by Fanderson (2006).; Adapted for screen as one of The Anniversary Episodes.
2	"F.A.B."	MA 107	Desmond Saunders and David Graham	N/A	N/A	April 1966
Plot: While investigating reports of supposed attacks by the legendary Abominable Snowman in the Himalayas, Lady Penelope and Parker are abducted by the disguised Hood.; Alternative title: "The Abominable Snowman".; Features an original song, "The Abominable Snowman", composed by Barry Gray and sung by Sylvia Anderson and David Graham.; Re-released on Lady Penelope Investigates (Century 21 LP compilation, 1966, code LA 4) and on CD by Fanderson (2006).; Adapted for screen as one of The Anniversary Episodes.
3	"Thunderbird 1"	MA 108	Gerry and Sylvia Anderson	"Trapped in the Sky"	Scott Tracy (Shane Rimmer)	April 1966
Re-released on International Rescues (Century 21 LP compilation, 1966, code LA 3) as well as Gerry Anderson Presents T.V. Favourites – Vol. 2 (Marble Arch LP, 1968, MAL 771), Thunderbirds & Captain Scarlet (Hallmark/Marble Arch LP, 1969, HMA 227), and Thunderbirds (PolyGram cassette, 1992, code 514 385–4).
4	"Thunderbird 2"	MA 109	Dennis Spooner	"End of the Road"	Brains (David Graham)	June 1966
Full title: "The End of the Road Featuring Thunderbird 2".; Re-released on International Rescues and Thunderbirds (PolyGram, 1992), and on CD by Fanderson (2008).
5	"The Stately Homes Robberies"	MA 110	Alan Fennell; Jim Watson (story)	N/A	N/A	June 1966
Plot: A series of mansion burglaries draws Lady Penelope and Parker into a conspiracy to raid the Tower of London and steal the Crown Jewels.; Re-released on Lady Penelope Investigates and on CD by Fanderson (2006).; Adapted for screen as one of The Anniversary Episodes.
6	"Thunderbird 3"	MA 112	Jim Watson	"Sun Probe"	Alan Tracy (Matt Zimmerman)	November 1966
Full title: "Sun Probe Featuring Thunderbird 3"; Re-released on Thunderbirds (PolyGram, 1992)
7	"Thunderbird 4"	MA 113	Jim Watson	"Terror in New York City"	Gordon Tracy (David Graham)	November 1966
Full title: "Terror in New York City Featuring Thunderbird 4"; Re-released on Thunderbirds (PolyGram, 1992)
8	"The Perils of Penelope"	MA 114	Jim Watson	"The Perils of Penelope"	Parker (David Graham)	November 1966
Re-released on Gerry Anderson Presents T.V. Favourites – Vol. 1 and Thunderbirds (PolyGram cassette, 1993, code 514 553–4)
9	"Lady Penelope and Parker"	MA 118	Len Cleal	"Vault of Death"	Lady Penelope (Sylvia Anderson)	January 1967
Full title: "The Vault of Death Featuring Lady Penelope and Parker"; Re-released on Thunderbirds (PolyGram, 1993) and on CD by Fanderson (2008)
10	"Brains and Tin-Tin"	MA 119	Len Cleal	"Desperate Intruder"	Tin-Tin (Christine Finn)	January 1967
Full title: "The Desperate Intruder Featuring Brains and Tin-Tin"; Re-released on Thunderbirds (PolyGram, 1993)
11	"International Rescue"	MA 120	Len Cleal	"The Impostors"	Scott Tracy (Shane Rimmer)	January 1967
Full title: "The Impostors Featuring International Rescue"; Re-released on Thunderbirds (PolyGram, 1993)
12	"Thunderbirds"	MA 121	Len Cleal	"Day of Disaster"	Gordon Tracy (David Graham)	March 1967
Full title: "Day of Disaster Featuring Thunderbirds"
13	"Lady Penelope"	MA 122	Len Cleal	"The Cham-Cham"	Parker (David Graham)	March 1967
Full title: "The Cham-Cham Featuring Lady Penelope"; Re-released on CD by Fanderson (2008)
14	"Brains"	MA 123	Len Cleal	"Alias Mr. Hackenbacker"	Brains (David Graham)	March 1967
Full title: "Alias Mr. Hackenbacker Featuring Brains"
15	"Brink of Disaster"	MA 124	Len Cleal	"Brink of Disaster"	Parker (David Graham)	May 1967
Full title: "Parker Tells the Story of the Action-Packed Episode 'Brink of Disaster'"
16	"Atlantic Inferno"	MA 125	Len Cleal	"Atlantic Inferno"	Gordon Tracy (David Graham)	May 1967
Full title: "Gordon Tells the Story of the Action-Packed Episode 'Atlantic Inferno'"
17	"Ricochet"	MA 126	Len Cleal	"Ricochet"	Brains (David Graham)	May 1967
Full title: "Brains Tells the Story of the Action-Packed Episode 'Ricochet'"
18	"One Move and You're Dead!"	MA 128	Alan Pattillo	"Move – and You're Dead"	Tin-Tin (Christine Finn)	July 1967
19	"Thirty Minutes After Noon"	MA 129	Alan Fennell	"30 Minutes After Noon"	Parker (David Graham)	July 1967

== Film sequels and compilations ==
=== Feature films ===
Two Thunderbirds feature films were released in the 1960s. The events of the first film, Thunderbirds Are Go, precede those of the final TV episode, "Give or Take a Million".

No.	Title	Directed by	Written by	Length	Original release date
1	Thunderbirds Are Go	David Lane	Gerry and Sylvia Anderson	93 minutes	15 December 1966
The spacecraft Zero-X is bound for Mars, carrying a crew of five astronauts. But when the craft experiences a critical mechanical fault shortly after take-off, the crew are forced to eject to safety while the multi-million dollar spacecraft crashes into the ocean. Two years later, an investigation committee releases the official report on the crash, concluding that the cause of the crash was sabotage. While the mission is put on hold, the committee decides that extra security measures would be required for a re-launch. After some debate, they decide to call on the services of International Rescue. The Thunderbirds machines, with the help of London Agent, Lady Penelope, make sure that the second launching attempt is successful. Once the craft lands on Mars, the crew start to explore the planet and collect rock samples, but when they encounter unexpected problems and are attacked by 'Rock Snakes', they are forced to return to Earth sooner than planned. On re-entering Earth's atmosphere, the crew encounter further problems when a lifting body (one of two remote controlled wings equipped with additional engines and undercarriage and used, one above the nose-end of the spacecraft and one under the engine cluster at the tail, for take-off and landing) suffers a mechanical fault and collides with the rear of the craft, damaging the escape unit circuit. With the crew unable to escape, it is again up to International Rescue to save the astronauts, as well as a town in the Zero-X flightpath, from disaster.
2	Thunderbird 6	David Lane	Gerry and Sylvia Anderson	89 minutes	29 July 1968
Jeff Tracy wants Brains to design a new Thunderbird vehicle, a project of such complexity that he is forced to decline his place on the maiden round-the-world flight of his jet-assisted airship, Skyship One. Lady Penelope, Alan, Tin-Tin and Parker are invited, and fly a rebuilt, vintage Tiger Moth biplane before boarding the airship. The International Rescue representatives set off on a luxury world tour, unaware that they are entrusting their safety to assassins who have murdered the real crew of Skyship One, are working for a master criminal identified as "Black Phantom", and are covertly recording and editing Penelope's conversations to assemble a false distress call summoning International Rescue to an abandoned airbase in the north African desert. With the ship inbound to England, the assassins have finally secured enough tape to send the message, but the four passengers have figured out the plan and warn Jeff Tracy in time to avert the hi-jacking of Thunderbirds 1 and 2. On Skyship One, the assassins are attacked, but in the ensuing gunfight manage to capture Tin-Tin as hostage. The ship's gravity drive is also damaged, and Skyship One crashes into the top of the central relay tower of a missile base near Dover. With the ship precariously suspended above ground, International Rescue must use the Tiger Moth to rescue the passengers and crew. The rescue attempt is disrupted when the assassins hi-jack the Tiger, just before Skyship One finally crashes to the ground.

=== Compilation films ===
Between 1980 and 1982, three compilation films were produced. Released on VHS by PolyGram and its subsidiary Channel 5 Video, each of these was made up of re-edited versions of two TV episodes.

No.	Title	Compilation of	Length	Original release date
1	Thunderbirds to the Rescue	"Trapped in the Sky" and "Operation Crash-Dive"	95 minutes approx.	1980
2	Thunderbirds in Outer Space	"Sun Probe" and "Ricochet"	95 minutes approx.	1981
3	Countdown to Disaster	"Terror in New York City" and "Atlantic Inferno"	95 minutes approx.	1982

== The Anniversary Episodes ==
In 2015, to mark Thunderbirds' 50th anniversary, ITV commissioned Pod 4 Films to produce a miniseries of new episodes based on the original audio stories from the 1960s. A budget of £218,000 budget was crowdfunded through Kickstarter. The project was endorsed by Sylvia Anderson as well as Gerry Anderson's estate.

Filming was conducted on the former premises of AP Films on the Slough Trading Estate, with a crew that included some of the production personnel from the original Thunderbirds. The adaptation of "The Stately Homes Robberies" was directed by David Elliott, making it his first new Thunderbirds episode in 49 years.

The mini-series had a premiere screening at the BFI Southbank in 2016 and was subsequently released on DVD and Blu-ray Disc to its Kickstarter backers. Titled The Anniversary Episodes, it was added to BritBox in 2020.

No.	Title	Directed by	Based on	Length	Original release date (BFI Southbank)
1	"Introducing Thunderbirds"	Justin T. Lee	"Introducing Thunderbirds"	25 minutes	17 August 2016
A beautiful island somewhere in the South Pacific. Outwardly, Tracy Island is nothing more than a luxury home for Jeff Tracy and his family. Secretly, it is the headquarters of the heroic International Rescue organisation. When newly recruited London agents Lady Penelope and Parker arrive for their very first visit, Jeff takes them on a tour to show them the fantastic Thunderbirds – the machines of the future.
2	"The Abominable Snowman"	Stephen La Rivière	"F.A.B."	29 minutes	17 August 2016
A sabotaged uranium plant explodes in a blazing inferno. Mountaineers in the Himalayas are mysteriously disappearing. What's the connection? Jeff Tracy assigns Lady Penelope and Parker to investigate. Exploring the mountainous Everest region by SkiCopter, the duo soon find themselves in grave danger when they discover their guide isn't who they thought he was. Scott Tracy blasts off in Thunderbird 1, but will he arrive in time?
3	"The Stately Homes Robberies"	David Elliott	"The Stately Homes Robberies"	26 minutes	17 August 2016
When stately homes across England are robbed of their most precious jewel collections, Jeff Tracy realises Lady Penelope's Creighton-Ward Manor may be next. Penelope and Parker track down the criminals in the Tower of London, but soon find themselves trapped inside with a bomb ready to go off.

== See also ==
- Lists of Thunderbirds home video releases
