= Danger at Ocean Deep =

- Thunderbirds episode
- Episode no.: Series 1 Episode 22
- Directed by: Desmond Saunders
- Written by: Donald Robertson
- Cinematography by: Julien Lugrin
- Editing by: Harry MacDonald
- Production code: 22
- Original air date: 3 February 1966

Guest character voices
- Ray Barrett as; Sir Arthur Captain Johnson TV Reporter Pioneer Controller: Peter Dyneley as; Lord Worden: David Graham as; Collins Ocean Pioneer II Officer: John Tate (uncredited) as; Ocean Pioneer II Captain Ocean Pioneer I Commander Stevens Launch Spectator: Matt Zimmerman as; Lieutenant Jensen

Episode chronology
← Previous "Cry Wolf"	Next → "The Duchess Assignment"

"Danger at Ocean Deep" is an episode of Thunderbirds, a British Supermarionation television series created by Gerry and Sylvia Anderson and filmed by their production company AP Films for ITC Entertainment. Written by Donald Robertson and directed by Desmond Saunders, it was first broadcast on 3 February 1966 on ATV Midlands as the 19th episode of Series One. In the official running order, it is the 22nd episode.

Set in the 2060s, Thunderbirds follows the missions of International Rescue, a secret organisation which uses technologically advanced rescue vehicles to save human life. The lead characters are ex-astronaut Jeff Tracy, founder of International Rescue, and his five adult sons, who pilot the organisation's primary vehicles: the Thunderbird machines. In "Danger at Ocean Deep", International Rescue must save the crew of a tanker when it sails into a patch of sea harbouring a fungus that reacts explosively with the vessel's cargo of liquid fuel.

The episode had its first UK‑wide network broadcast on 7 February 1992 on BBC2.

== Plot ==
While crossing the Mediterranean Sea, the British nuclear-powered tanker Ocean Pioneer I enters what appears to be a fogbank, then explodes. Both its skeleton crew of three, and shipment of liquid alsterene fuel, are lost.

Six months later, Ocean Pioneer II is launched on its maiden voyage through the Mediterranean. The vessel is christened by Lady Penelope, who is attending the ceremony at International Rescue's request to rule out the possibility of sabotage campaign against the Ocean Pioneer fleet. After Penelope contacts Tracy Island to report that all is well, International Rescue receives an emergency call from Hawaii, where a hurricane is making landfall and threatening a hospital on Oahu. The rescue operation involving Thunderbirds 1 and 2 is complicated by unexplained radio interference, making it impossible for Scott, Virgil and Gordon to contact base via Thunderbird 5. Alan is soon to blast off in Thunderbird 3 to relieve John aboard the space station. Wanting the transmission recordings for analysis, Jeff orders Alan to leave early and take Brains with him. Brains retrieves the tapes and returns to base with John on Thunderbird 3.

Examining the tapes, Brains finds the cause of the trouble: proximity of liquid fuel to the marine fungus OD60, causing radio interference then an explosion. Although OD60 is native to the Gulf Stream, the source of the interference is traced to the Mediterranean, indicating that a fuel-fungus interaction is occurring there. Tin-Tin remembers that OD60 is an ingredient of a dog food made by British pet food manufacturer Allpets, for which Penelope judged a poodle show. Assigned to investigate Allpets, Penelope learns that the company has dumped masses of OD60 in the Mediterranean to cut shipping times and costs.

International Rescue realise that with its payload of alsterene, the second Ocean Pioneer is heading for the same fate as the first. The radio interference is blocking communication with the ship, so Thunderbirds 1 and 2 are launched to intercept it. Ocean Pioneer's reactor goes critical, forcing the crew to lower radiation shields around the bridge – just as the ship reaches the OD60 mist. An explosion cuts off the air supply to the bridge and the crew fall unconscious.

Finding the ship adrift, Scott lands Thunderbird 1 on the deck. He is joined by John, who is winched down to the ship from Thunderbird 2, and the pair use plasma torches to cut through the bridge shields. They revive the crew, who are lifted aboard Thunderbird 2. International Rescue evacuate the area seconds before the ship blows up.

In the closing scene, John expresses regret that International Rescue was unable to prevent the destruction of the costly tanker. Jeff points out that their mission is to save human life, not property.

== Regular voice cast ==
- Sylvia Anderson as Lady Penelope
- Ray Barrett as John Tracy
- Peter Dyneley as Jeff Tracy
- Christine Finn as Tin-Tin Kyrano
- David Graham as Gordon Tracy, Brains, Parker and Kyrano
- David Holliday as Virgil Tracy
- Shane Rimmer as Scott Tracy
- Matt Zimmerman as Alan Tracy

== Production ==
The puppet playing Lord Worden, the character presiding over the Ocean Pioneer II launch, previously appeared as Sir Jeremy Hodge in "The Perils of Penelope". The incidental music was mostly stock music originally composed for Stingray, including the episode "Sea of Oil".

"Danger at Ocean Deep" is the only episode of Thunderbirds in which John Tracy actually joins his brothers on a rescue operation, instead of relaying communications from Thunderbird 5. However, in one scene, John claims to have attended "about a dozen" rescues.

== Reception ==
Rating the episode four out of five, Starburst magazine's Tom Fox calls Brains' explanation of the radio interference "as amusing as it is improbable", adding that "it gets even better" when it is revealed that a dog food company has been dumping a fungus in the Mediterranean Sea. Marcus Hearn acknowledges the "futuristic verisimilitude" of alsterene and OD60, also noting the humour introduced by the connection to dog food. He argues that by using these and other fictional substances as plot devices, Thunderbirds showed itself to be "surprisingly creative when it came to scientific accuracy", considering that the series was "seemingly aimed at the Look and Learn generation". Hearn also praises the guest voice acting of Peter Dyneley and John Tate.

For screenwriter Peter Briggs, "Danger at Ocean Deep" is one of three Thunderbirds episodes (the others being "Attack of the Alligators!" and "Path of Destruction") whose main theme may be characterised as "weird science". Michael Coldwell writes that it is one of several to imply criticism of increased automation, noting that the destroyed Ocean Pioneers are self-running except for their three-man bridge crews. Coldwell also states that the opening sequence's "creepily atmospheric" scale model effects and "sinister" incidental music, combined with character dialogue, create an air of "dreadful inevitability" as Ocean Pioneer I sails into the fog.
