= The Duchess Assignment =

- Thunderbirds episode
- Episode no.: Series 1 Episode 23
- Directed by: David Elliott
- Written by: Martin Crump
- Cinematography by: Julien Lugrin
- Editing by: Harry Ledger
- Production code: 23
- Original air date: 17 February 1966

Guest character voices
- Sylvia Anderson as; Miss Godolphin Air Terrainean Flight Attendant: Ray Barrett as; Deborah, Duchess of Royston Air Show Spectator Fireflash Co-Pilot: Peter Dyneley as; Chandler Casino Owner First Croupier: Christine Finn as; Hotel Receptionist: David Graham as; Wilbur Dandridge III Air Show Spectator (Percy) Customs Officer Captain Hanson Automated Elevator Voice: John Tate (uncredited) as; Brophy: Matt Zimmerman as; Second Croupier Hendricks

Episode chronology
← Previous "Danger at Ocean Deep"	Next → "Attack of the Alligators!"

"The Duchess Assignment" is an episode of Thunderbirds, a British Supermarionation television series created by Gerry and Sylvia Anderson and filmed by their production company AP Films for ITC Entertainment. Written by Martin Crump and directed by David Elliott, it was first broadcast on 17 February 1966 on ATV Midlands as the 21st episode of Series One. It is the 23rd episode in the official running order.

Set in the 2060s, the series follows the exploits of International Rescue, an organisation that uses technologically advanced rescue vehicles to save human life. The main characters are ex-astronaut Jeff Tracy, founder of International Rescue, and his five adult sons, who pilot the organisation's primary fleet of vehicles: the Thunderbird machines.

The plot of "The Duchess Assignment" follows an elderly British duchess who has lost nearly all of her fortune through gambling so is forced to loan out a valuable painting in her possession to avoid financial ruin. When the duchess is kidnapped by criminals intent on stealing the fee for the painting, the Tracy family must rescue her.

== Plot ==
While holidaying in France, International Rescue agent Lady Penelope finds an old acquaintance – Deborah, Duchess of Royston – losing heavily at a casino. Unaware that criminals Brophy and Chandler are eavesdropping, Deborah tells Penelope that she has been driven to gambling after "falling on hard times" and has already lost most of her possessions. Penelope realises that the roulette table has been rigged but is unable to stop the croupiers running off with Deborah's money and tiara. Parker has a shootout with the casino owner, who escapes in a car driven by one of the croupiers. Penelope and Parker give chase in FAB 1 but the fraudsters get away.

Deborah has just one valuable possession left: Portrait of a Gazelle, a painting by Braquasso. After attending a London airshow and visiting an art gallery with Jeff Tracy, Penelope tells Jeff of the Duchess's financial problems. Eager to help, Jeff contacts his friend, New York City businessman Wilbur Dandridge, whose gazelle-obsessed company Gazelle Automations is looking for a new logo. Although Deborah is unwilling to sell the painting outright, she agrees to loan it to Dandridge for the same price, and flies to New York to observe the handover.

While preparing to collect Deborah from the airport, Dandridge's chauffeur Hendricks is knocked unconscious by Brophy and Chandler, who plan to steal the Duchess's fee. When Deborah lands, Brophy, posing as Hendricks, drives her to an abandoned country house, ties her to a chair in the basement, switches on a leaking gas supply and leaves her to suffocate. Meanwhile, Chandler arrives at Gazelle Automations with the painting, introducing himself as the Duchess's representative. However, he is unaware that Penelope has warned Dandridge to expect an impostor, having tracked Deborah's movements using a homing device hidden inside a Saint Christopher brooch that she gave the Duchess as a present. Dandridge pulls a gun on Chandler, who raises his arms in surrender, but in doing so throws the painting into the air, where it is grazed by Dandridge's hastily fired bullet.

Penelope alerts Tracy Island to Deborah's plight and Jeff dispatches Scott and Virgil in Thunderbirds 1 and 2. In the basement, Deborah's attempts to break free of her bindings cause her to knock a ladder into a fuse box, which emits sparks that cause the gas to ignite. Scott and Virgil arrive just as an explosion tears through the house. While Virgil tunnels down to the burning basement in the Mole, Scott uses the DOMO (Demolition and Object Moving Operator) to hold up the house's one surviving wall. Virgil and the freed Deborah clear the area before the wall collapses on top of and destroys the basement.

Penelope, Parker and Dandridge visit Deborah as she recovers in hospital. Brophy, Chandler and the casino fraudsters have all been arrested and all of Deborah's stolen money is being returned to her. Dandridge believes Portrait of a Gazelle to be irreparably damaged, but to everyone's amazement, Deborah unscrews the handle of her umbrella to reveal the painting rolled up inside – the canvas that travelled to New York was a copy. Reporters are offering large sums for the rights to the Duchess's life story, and before long, she is back at the casino.

== Regular voice cast ==
- Sylvia Anderson as Lady Penelope
- Ray Barrett as John Tracy
- Peter Dyneley as Jeff Tracy
- Christine Finn as Tin-Tin Kyrano and Grandma Tracy
- David Graham as Parker
- David Holliday as Virgil Tracy
- Shane Rimmer as Scott Tracy
- Matt Zimmerman as Alan Tracy

== Production ==
[Christine Finn and Sylvia Anderson] couldn't quite capture the tone required. Peter Dyneley and I could see that we would have trouble making it to the pub by two o'clock if this went on much longer, so I suggested to Gerry [Anderson] that I play the Duchess. He gave me a strange look but agreed to let me have a go [...] I simply gave an impression of Dame Edith and it worked perfectly.

— Ray Barrett recalls the dialogue recording in his autobiography

The puppet appearing as the Duchess was based on actress Dame Edith Evans, known for her stage work as well as film appearances such as Lady Bracknell in The Importance of Being Earnest (1952). Evans was also the inspiration for the character's voice, which was provided by Ray Barrett when neither of the series' female voice artists – Christine Finn and Sylvia Anderson – were able to produce convincing tones during the episode's dialogue recording session. In an interview, Barrett recalled telling Gerry Anderson "Oh, sod this. Gerry, I'll play it" – to which Anderson replied, "What?" and others gave puzzled looks. The cast were highly amused by Barrett's imitation of Evans. Matt Zimmerman said: "How we got through that episode I'll never know. I never laughed so much in my life." Sylvia Anderson found the voice "marvellously camp" and the recording session "quite hilarious".

Human elements and forced perspective were used to create the POV shot of Parker pulling his gun on the casino owner: the foreground shows a human hand holding a prop gun, taking aim at the 1/3-scale puppet positioned at the back of the set. The episodes "30 Minutes After Noon" and "The Man from MI.5" contain similar shots.

The carrier aircraft featured in the London airshow scene was one of the first designs special effects assistant Mike Trim produced for Thunderbirds. Trim also designed the DOMO – a modified version of the Excavator, which was originally built for "Martian Invasion". Effects director Derek Meddings considered the DOMO "practical-looking" and "very dramatic on-screen". Both Portrait of a Gazelle and the splatter paintings featured in the art gallery scene were created by production designer Keith Wilson. One of the paintings in the background is an abstract of Alan Tracy, which Wilson originally made for the episode "Move – and You're Dead".

The puppet appearing as Wilbur Dandridge first played Warren Grafton in "Brink of Disaster". The puppet of the disguised Hood can be seen standing behind Jeff Tracy during the airshow scene.

== Broadcast and reception ==
"The Duchess Assignment" had its first UK-wide network broadcast on 6 March 1992 on BBC2.

=== Critical response ===
Stephen La Rivière writes that "The Duchess Assignment" has an "enjoyable, quirky charm", praising aspects such as the design of the Deborah puppet and describing the story in general as "one of the most unusual episodes in the Anderson canon". Tom Fox of Starburst magazine gives the episode four stars out of five, believing the plot predictable but praising the series' "return to detective-style shenanigans" following the episodes "The Perils of Penelope" and "Vault of Death". Sylvia Anderson commended Crump's script for including action sequences in the episode's "far from futuristic" plot.

Michael Coldwell praises Elliott's "assured direction" and art director Bob Bell's "outstanding" set design, as well as the script's "balance of action, futuristic technology and distinctively quirky characterisation". He considers Barrett's impression of Edith Evans "in full Lady Bracknell mode" to be a "fine match" for the character of the Duchess. Coldwell also suggests that the episode's "Ealing Comedy set-up" demonstrates Gerry Anderson's "affection for English eccentricity" and argues that International Rescue's reduced role shows "just how well Lady Penelope and Parker could have carried their own series". Mike Fillis, a contributor to Cult Times and Ultimate DVD magazines, applauds the episode's humour and sound effects. He compares the portrayal of the Duchess of Royston to Margaret Rutherford as the Duchess of Brighton in the 1963 film The V.I.P.s.

Marcus Hearn, author of Thunderbirds: The Vault, calls the episode "engaging". He notes that Deborah's destitution is partly the result of gambling addiction: "another of the adult vices that makes a surprise appearance in a series ostensibly aimed at children." He believes that the costume worn by the Penelope puppet in the art gallery scene – a dress presenting blocks of white and red with black borders – was inspired by the work of Piet Mondrian. Hearn also considers David Graham's voice for the Gazelle company's automated elevator (which takes Jeff to Dandridge's office) "a variation of the grating delivery" that he had used when voicing Daleks in 1960s Doctor Who.

John Marriott, in his book Thunderbirds Are Go!, calls the DOMO an "entertaining" vehicle and expresses disappointment that it does not appear in any later episodes. John Peel notes that in the closing scene at the hospital, the wall next to Deborah's bed features a panel called "Auto-Nurse" that monitors patients' vital signs, which he describes as "almost a duplicate" of a device seen in Star Trek: The Original Series.
