= Path of Destruction (Thunderbirds) =

- Thunderbirds episode
- The episode features the Crablogger: a giant, clawed, tree-sawing and -pulping machine. Praised by commentators, the atomic-powered Crablogger has generated discussion about the episode's depiction of nuclear technology, and drawn comparisons to heavy goods vehicles and their toll on developing road networks.
- Episode no.: Series 2 Episode 2
- Directed by: David Elliott
- Written by: Donald Robertson
- Cinematography by: Julien Lugrin
- Editing by: Harry MacDonald
- Production code: 28
- Original air date: 9 October 1966

Guest character voices
- Sylvia Anderson as Maria; Ray Barrett as Jansen; Christine Finn as Mrs Lucas; David Graham as Simms, Sanchos, Manuel & Jim Lucas; John Tate (uncredited) as McColl & Security Guard; Jeremy Wilkin as Peterson; Matt Zimmerman as Franklin & Gutierrez

Episode chronology
← Previous "Atlantic Inferno"	Next → "Alias Mr. Hackenbacker"

"Path of Destruction" is the 28th episode of Thunderbirds, a British Supermarionation television series created by Gerry and Sylvia Anderson and filmed by their production company AP Films (APF) for ITC Entertainment. Written by Donald Robertson and directed by David Elliott, it was first broadcast on 9 October 1966 on ATV London and Anglia Television as the second episode of Series Two. It had its first UK-wide network broadcast on 24 April 1992 on BBC2.

Set in the 2060s, Thunderbirds follows the missions of International Rescue, a secret organisation that uses technologically advanced rescue vehicles to save human life. The lead characters are ex-astronaut Jeff Tracy, founder of International Rescue, and his five adult sons, who pilot the organisation's primary fleet of vehicles: the Thunderbird machines. In "Path of Destruction", a giant tree-felling machine called the Crablogger veers off course after its crew pass out from food poisoning. Lady Penelope tracks down the Crablogger's designer to obtain the emergency shutdown sequence while the Tracys and Brains race to stop the machine before it destroys a dam.

== Plot ==
The Crablogger, a giant logging vehicle powered by liquid fuel and an atomic reactor, has been built for use in the forests of South America. The night before the Crablogger leaves its base camp on its first expedition, project leader Jansen takes the crew out to dinner at Sanchos, a restaurant with extremely poor hygiene. They order a "special", which turns out to be a disgusting stew. The next morning, shortly after the Crablogger begins operations, the crew pass out from food poisoning. With no one at the controls, the machine veers off course towards the village of San Martino and the nearby San Martino Dam. Although the village is safely evacuated, a collision with the dam will cause a nuclear explosion and widespread flooding.

Jansen radios International Rescue for help in stopping the Crablogger. Jeff dispatches Scott, Virgil and Brains in Thunderbirds 1 and 2, then contacts Lady Penelope in England and tasks her with obtaining the Crablogger's emergency shutdown sequence from Jim Lucas, the vehicle's designer at Robotics International. As the Crablogger tears through San Martino and moves on to the dam, Penelope and Parker proceed to Robotics International's headquarters in FAB 1 only to find that Lucas has gone home for the night. Using a hypnotic ray on a security guard, they find a personnel file with Lucas' address and drive to his home, but are delayed en route when they come across a road accident victim. Reaching the danger zone, Brains and Virgil transfer to Thunderbird 2's Mobile Crane and intercept the Crablogger. Donning jetpacks and boarding the vehicle, they cut into the cockpit with lasers and have the crew airlifted to hospital.

Breaking into the sleeping Lucas' house, Penelope wakes him at gunpoint and orders him to recite the shutdown sequence into a tape recorder. She then shoots him with a tranquilliser to send him back to sleep and relays the information to Brains and Virgil. Brains inputs the sequence, but it will take three minutes for the Crablogger's reactor to power down and the dam is straight ahead. Eventually the vehicle comes to a halt on a crumbling ridge. Scott arrives in a tanker and passes its lines over to Virgil and Brains, who pump out the Crablogger's remaining fuel to avert a large explosion that could threaten the dam. Their job complete, they fly to safety in their jetpacks moments before the ridge collapses and the Crablogger falls to the ground. The vehicle is destroyed but the dam is untouched. Lucas, who thought that his encounter with Penelope was just a dream, is stunned to learn of the events and accidentally lets slip the encounter with Penelope much to the irate suspicion of his wife.

== Regular voice cast ==
- Sylvia Anderson as Lady Penelope
- Ray Barrett as John Tracy
- Peter Dyneley as Jeff Tracy
- Christine Finn as Tin-Tin Kyrano
- David Graham as Brains and Parker
- Shane Rimmer as Scott Tracy
- Jeremy Wilkin as Virgil Tracy

== Production ==
The Crablogger was designed by special effects director Derek Meddings, who contributed on set by operating the props for the vehicle's clawed arms. The rear of the studio model was fitted with cans of compressed air whose contents were slowly released to simulate a dust trail. This threw so many particles into the air that the crew were forced to wear respirators while filming the model. The Crablogger theme is a reuse of the Sidewinder theme from "Pit of Peril".

The San Martino Dam was a modified form of a scale model originally built for the Stingray episode "In Search of the Tajmanon". The freight lorries in front of the dam were represented by Matchbox die-cast toys.

"Path of Destruction" was the final APF production of director David Elliott, who believed that his friendship with Gerry Anderson had broken down and left the company shortly after completing his work on the episode.

== Reception ==
Marcus Hearn calls the episode a "classic" as well as "one of the most compelling" Thunderbirds instalments, boasting a "heady cocktail of food poisoning, nuclear contamination and flooding". He regards it as superior to "Pit of Peril", which he considers thematically similar. Hearn praises the addition of Penelope and Parker stopping to aid a road accident victim, noting it sticks to the organisation's code that people's lives always come first, and the humorous scene where Lucas is forced to give the code to Penelope and is then questioned by his wife about the "girl in the bedroom". Sylvia Anderson remembered "Path of Destruction" as a "great special effects episode" and the Crablogger concept "marvellous" and "ingenious". The Crablogger has also been well received by Peter Briggs, who praises it both as a vehicle and as a plot device. He believes that with its references to food poisoning, "Path of Destruction" is one of several Thunderbirds stories that can be categorised as "weird science".

Rating the episode three out of five, Tom Fox of Starburst magazine praises the story's "nicely direct dilemma" and unpredictable resolution, as well as the "marvellously monstrous machines" on display and the scenes of the Crablogger wreaking havoc (which he considers to be the episode's highlight). He is less complimentary of the restaurant sequence, arguing that it promotes negative stereotypes about South Americans.

Mark Braxton writes that the Crablogger itself "strains credibility", arguing that the combination of a nuclear-powered design and obscure shutdown procedure turns it into "a disaster waiting to happen". However, he regards the overall episode as an entertaining "race-against-time" story, asserting that it "would have made a great big-screen outing". He believes the restaurant scenes display the Andersons' skill in devising "comic, even grotesque characters and situations" and counts the rat-infested kitchen – complete with a real mouse scurrying across a table – among the "great triumphs" of series art director Bob Bell. He also praises the "seamless" integration of Penelope and Parker's subplot, adding that their meeting with Lucas results in "one of the show's funniest pay-offs".

Hearn, Anderson and Nicholas J. Cull have all commented on the episode's depiction of nuclear hazards. According to Hearn, "Path of Destruction" is one of several Thunderbirds episodes that portray humanity as being "dangerously over-reliant" on atomic power – to such an extent that the fictional world of the series "seems to teeter on the brink of a radioactive nightmare". Cull writes that along with many other APF productions, "Path of Destruction" shows that "nuclear weapons and wider nuclear fears in general" were a major influence on Gerry Anderson's work.

For Ian Fryer, the episode plays on contemporary fears about travel abroad and developments in road transport. He notes that the Crablogger crew fall ill through interacting with a foreign culture and draws parallels between the rampaging machine and the heavy goods vehicles of 1960s Britain, which were being built larger but lacked the infrastructure (namely motorways – then a new addition to the road network) to move from place to place without having to pass through small towns, causing disruption to the residents. He comments that "in a splendid example of [science fiction's] magnification of effects", the episode takes the idea of a "commercial vehicle inconveniencing local traffic" and expands it to create the "rather more dramatic scenario of an out-of-control nuclear-powered wood pulp factory about to destroy an entire town."

Noting that International Rescue are unable to prevent the Crablogger's destruction, John Marriott writes that the episode highlights the organisation's "humanity-over-machines" ethos. Stephen Baxter compares the Crablogger to the giant excavators mining for unobtainium in the film Avatar (2009).
