= Edge of Impact =

- Thunderbirds episode
- Episode no.: Series 1 Episode 16
- Directed by: Desmond Saunders
- Written by: Donald Robertson
- Cinematography by: Paddy Seale
- Editing by: Peter Elliott
- Production code: 16
- Original air date: 28 October 1965

Guest character voices
- Ray Barrett as; Technician Stan London Airport Lieutenant Police Officer 2: Peter Dyneley as; Commander Norman: Christine Finn as; Police Radio Dispatcher: David Graham as; Colonel Casey General Bron Technician Jim Pilot Race Police Officer 1: Matt Zimmerman as; Pilot Goddard General Bron's Pilot

Episode chronology
← Previous "Day of Disaster"	Next → "Desperate Intruder"

"Edge of Impact" is the 16th episode of Thunderbirds, a British Supermarionation television series created by Gerry and Sylvia Anderson and filmed by their production company AP Films for ITC Entertainment. Written by Donald Robertson and directed by Desmond Saunders, it was first broadcast on 28 October 1965 on ATV Midlands as the fifth episode of Series One. It had its first UK‑wide network broadcast on 29 November 1991 on BBC2.

Set in the 2060s, Thunderbirds follows the missions of International Rescue, a secret organisation that uses technologically advanced rescue vehicles to save human life. The lead characters are ex-astronaut Jeff Tracy, founder of International Rescue, and his five adult sons, who pilot the organisation's primary vehicles: the Thunderbird machines.

In "Edge of Impact", master criminal the Hood is hired to sabotage military test flights; one of his attempts causes an experimental fighter to crash into a television tower, trapping a pair of technicians inside. With an old friend of Jeff, the project master that the Hood is sabotaging, paying an unexpected visit to Tracy Island, International Rescue must covertly spring into action to save the two men before the tower collapses.

== Plot ==
General Bron, a power-hungry warlord, hires the Hood to sabotage the Red Arrow: a new British-made experimental fighter plane and the only threat to Bron's military. Travelling to London Airport, the Hood sabotages a test flight of Red Arrow 1 by concealing a homing device in a hangar, causing the aircraft to veer out of control and crash; blacking out before he can eject, the pilot, Race, is killed. The disaster is attributed to unidentified design flaws and Colonel Tim Casey, World Space Control project supervisor, is replaced for the test programme on Red Arrow 2. Bron orders the Hood to destroy the second prototype, Red Arrow 2, promising to reward him in gold.

An aircraft flies to Tracy Island leading Jeff to activate the "Operation Cover-Up" security measures to prevent International Rescue being discovered. The visitor is Casey, who is an old air force comrade of Jeff. Judging the blueprints sound, Brains concludes that Red Arrow 1 must have been diverted from its original course. Predicting that it is sabotage, he designs a "diversion detector" to be installed on Red Arrow 2 to warn the pilot, Goddard. As Red Arrow 2 takes off, the Hood attaches another homing device to a television tower operated by British Telecommunication. Red Arrow 2 is drawn off course, confirmed by Brains' detector, and although the pilot, Goddard, ejects, the plane crashes into the tower; the explosion fatally weakens the structure and traps two technicians, Jim and Stan, who are working in the control room at the top. The arrival of a storm makes helicopter pick-up impossible, so Stan and Jim radio International Rescue for help.

As a diversionary tactic to enable the rescue to take place, Tin-Tin keeps Casey out of the way – taking him scuba diving under the pretext of searching for a rare marine mammal, the water mamba. Meanwhile, Jeff dispatches Scott, Virgil and Alan in Thunderbirds 1 and 2. Reaching the tower, the brothers use the Booster Mortar pod vehicle (a mobile cannon) to fire two Low Altitude Escape Harnesses jet packs through the window of the control cabin. Donning the harnesses, Jim and Stan lift off from the tower seconds before it collapses and land safely nearby. Virgil finds the homing device and contacts the police. A patrol car spots the Hood's van and gives chase. The Hood drives though a diversion, mistaking it for a police roadblock, and flies straight off the end of a collapsed bridge, plunging into the river below. Bron, furious that the sabotages have been exposed, berates the Hood over the van's radio.

The Thunderbirds return to base unseen by Casey, allowing Tin-Tin to bring him back from diving. Casey is delighted to learn that International Rescue have solved the mystery of the Red Arrow disasters and he has been reinstated at World Space Control and is to resume the Red Arrow tests. None the wiser about the Tracys' secret activities, he departs.

== Regular voice cast ==
- Ray Barrett as the Hood
- Peter Dyneley as Jeff Tracy
- Christine Finn as Tin-Tin Kyrano
- David Graham as Gordon Tracy and Brains
- David Holliday as Virgil Tracy
- Shane Rimmer as Scott Tracy
- Matt Zimmerman as Alan Tracy

== Production ==
"Edge of Impact" is the only episode featuring the Hood in which his schemes do not involve trying to uncover the technical secrets of the Thunderbird machines or otherwise targeting International Rescue. Instead, his only aim is to destroy the Red Arrow project. He gives his codename as "Six-Seven-One" when he contracts General Bron. The puppet for Tim Casey had previously appeared as a bank executive in "Vault of Death". The miniature model representing the Hood's van previously appeared as reporter Ned Cook's news van in "Terror in New York City".

Red Arrow was inspired by the North American X-15 and Lockheed NF-104A. The filming model, designed by effects assistant Mike Trim, incorporated parts from a Saab 35 Draken model aircraft kit. Trim also designed the British Telecommunication TV tower.

The incidental music was recorded on 18 June 1965 with a 25-member band.

== Reception ==
Tom Fox of Starburst magazine rates "Edge of Impact" three out of five, believing the Low Altitude Escape Harnesses to be the highlight of the episode. Marcus Hearn sums up the story as a "disappointingly familiar routine of sabotaged test flights". He considers the Low Altitude Escape Harnesses an "innovative" but "incongruous" rescue solution, likening them to a "deus ex machina". Some of the episode's other hardware he describes as "frankly ridiculous" – noting, for example, that Tin-Tin is secretly updated on the progress of the rescue by flashing lights fitted to her diving mask.

Sam Denham writes that the plot, involving experimental military aircraft and a TV tower, reflects the "burgeoning" technology of the 1960s – specifically, advancements in aerospace engineering and the decade's "growing dependence on telecommunications". He compares the TV tower to the real-life BT Tower which opened in October 1965, the same month the episode was first broadcast. Marcus Hearn and Nicholas J. Cull compare the sabotage premise to Cold War fiction, Cull noting "Edge of Impact" as one of two episodes (the other being "Martian Invasion") that show the Hood in the employ of "militaristic foreign powers". According to Hearn, the "Cold War-style tension" is at odds with most other episodes, which imply strong international cooperation and even world government. Anderson commentator Fred McNamara praises the episode's "insightful character backgrounds to Cold War-tinged jeopardy", in particular, Jeff and Colonel Casey's backstory, and the Tracy brothers' emotional reaction when they think that the rescue has failed.

In her autobiography, Sylvia Anderson wrote that the episode casts Tin-Tin as a "sex object"; she commented elsewhere that the character is also objectified in "End of the Road" when her former boyfriend visits Tracy Island, sparking a romantic rivalry with Alan Tracy. Jeff alludes to these events when Casey's jet comes in to land, the unannounced nature of the visit leading him to wonder whether the colonel's plane might be carrying "more of Tin-Tin's admirers". According to Fran Pheasant-Kelly, an academic who has written about the series' depiction of gender and social class, this line of dialogue draws the audience's attention to Tin-Tin's "physical attractiveness" as a mostly peripheral female character, downplaying her ability to "contribute significantly to the narrative". Pheasant-Kelly also notes, however, that the subplot of Tin-Tin distracting Casey during the rescue shows that "does carry out certain crucial roles".
