= Desperate Intruder =

- Thunderbirds episode
- Episode no.: Series 1 Episode 17
- Directed by: David Lane
- Written by: Donald Robertson
- Cinematography by: Julien Lugrin
- Editing by: Harry MacDonald
- Production code: 17
- Original air date: 18 November 1965

Guest character voices
- Peter Dyneley as Professor Blakely; David Graham as Hassan Ali

Episode chronology
← Previous "Edge of Impact"	Next → "30 Minutes After Noon"

"Desperate Intruder" is an episode of Thunderbirds, a British Supermarionation television series created by Gerry and Sylvia Anderson and filmed by their production company AP Films (later Century 21 Productions) for ITC Entertainment. Written by Donald Robertson and directed by David Lane, it was first broadcast on 18 November 1965 on ATV Midlands as the eighth episode of Series One. In the official running order, it is the 17th episode.

Set in the 2060s, Thunderbirds follows the missions of International Rescue, a secret organisation which uses technologically advanced rescue vehicles to save human life. The lead characters are ex-astronaut Jeff Tracy, founder of International Rescue, and his five adult sons, who pilot the organisation's primary vehicles: the Thunderbird machines. International Rescue's main antagonist is master criminal the Hood, who engineers or obstructs emergency situations for his own gain. In "Desperate Intruder", the organisation is forced into action to save two of its own members when Brains and Tin-Tin (voiced by David Graham and Christine Finn) are attacked by the Hood during an archaeological expedition in search of lost treasure.

In 1967, Century 21 released a condensed audio adaptation of "Desperate Intruder" on EP record (Brains and Tin-Tin, catalogue number MA 119), with narration by Christine Finn in character as Tin-Tin. The episode had its first UK‑wide network broadcast on 3 January 1992 on BBC2.

== Plot ==
Brains and Tin-Tin depart for the Middle East to conduct an archaeological survey at Lake Anasta, which contains a submerged temple believed to harbour lost treasure. Unknown to International Rescue, the Hood has got wind of this plan and wants the treasure for himself. Having used his telepathy and hypnosis on Kyrano to obtain Brains and Tin-Tin's schedule, the Hood is first to reach the lake, arriving in a truck from which he unloads a midget submarine. He hides the truck, transfers to the submarine and takes up position on the lakebed.

Having been flown out in Thunderbird 2, Brains and Tin-Tin drive their truck and two caravans to a rendezvous with their expedition partner, English archaeologist Professor Blakely. After the three of them arrive at the lake, Brains and Tin-Tin dive to the temple and bring back a sample of rock from one of its columns, which Blakely confirms contains treasure.

Surfacing, the Hood makes his way to the caravans and hypnotises everyone into unconsciousness. Demanding the location of the treasure, he tortures Brains by burying him up to his neck in the desert sand, but Brains passes out again before he can answer. On Tracy Island, Jeff is concerned by the loss of radio contact with Brains and Tin-Tin and sends out Scott, Virgil and Gordon in Thunderbirds 1 and 2 to investigate. As the brothers rescue the survey party, the Hood uses his submarine's periscope to photograph the two Thunderbirds.

Jeff orders all International Rescue personnel back to base once Blakely, who is yet to regain consciousness, has been airlifted to hospital. Scott discovers that Thunderbird 1's camera detector has been active, prompting Brains to realise that their attacker has been using the expedition as bait to lure International Rescue into a trap. Desperate to make amends for the trouble, he dives back to the temple alone to recover more treasure, unaware that the Hood has rigged the area with intruder alarms and explosive charges. Alerted to Brains' presence, the Hood exits his submarine and re-hypnotises Brains, then detonates the explosives, devastating the temple.

Deploying Thunderbird 4 from Thunderbird 2's pod, Gordon locates the unconscious Brains, trapped under a pillar with his air supply running out. Seeking to destroy Thunderbird 4 with his submarine, the Hood launches a torpedo attack, but Gordon returns fire and downs the submarine. The Hood abandons ship moments before the craft explodes. Scott joins Gordon and together they use a lifting bag to raise the pillar. The cable snaps, but not before they extract Brains.

Some time later, while visiting Blakely in hospital, Brains and Tin-Tin politely but firmly decline the professor's invitation to join him on a treasure hunt in the Caribbean.

== Regular voice cast ==
- Ray Barrett as the Hood
- Peter Dyneley as Jeff Tracy
- Christine Finn as Tin-Tin Kyrano and Grandma Tracy
- David Graham as Gordon Tracy, Brains and Kyrano
- David Holliday as Virgil Tracy
- Shane Rimmer as Scott Tracy

== Production ==
With only two guest characters (Professor Blakely and a taxi driver), "Desperate Intruder" has the smallest guest cast of any Thunderbirds episode. The miniature model representing Brains and Tin-Tin's truck originally appeared in "The Uninvited" as a desert vehicle driven by a pair of archaeologists.

Incidental music was recorded on 2 July 1965 with a 25-member band. The scenes set in and around Lake Anasta also feature music and sound effects that were originally produced for Stingray.

== Reception ==
For screenwriter Peter Briggs, "Desperate Intruder" is one of two Thunderbirds episodes (the other being "The Uninvited") which can be classed as "archaeological treasure quests".

Rating the episode four out of five, Tom Fox of Starburst magazine writes that "Desperate Intruder" emphasises the Hood's "venal" and cruel nature, adding that the negative "stock stereotype" that he represents is redeemed by the "sheer silliness of [his] hypnotising naughtiness". He considers the exotic location and the "eccentric" guest character Professor Blakely to be the episode's highlights.

Describing the story as a "straightforward yarn" about lost treasure, Marcus Hearn states that Robertson's script "chooses to ignore" many of Thunderbirds' key themes, noting that the customary "emphasis on technology and engineering [...] is almost entirely missing here." He argues that the unconventional premise, as well as the focus on a single location and limited supporting cast, make "Desperate Intruder" an atypical episode.

Richard Farrell likens the adventure theme to that of Supercar. However, he considers the treasure a "MacGuffin", noting that it is largely forgotten by the end of the episode. Farrell praises Peter Dyneley's voice for Blakely, calling the professor's exaggerated Englishness one of Thunderbirds' "broadest caricatures".
