= Martin Crump =

- Born: Martin Antony Crump; 9 July 1931; Fulham, London, England
- Died: 27 November 2008 (aged 77); Camden, London, England
- Occupations: Editor, Writer

Martin Crump (9 July 1931 – 27 November 2008) was an editor and scriptwriter who worked in the British film and TV industry.

== Career ==
He began his career working as an assistant film editor (uncredited) on movies such as Storm Over the Nile (1955), Loser Takes All (1956) and The Battle of the Sexes (1960). In 1964, Desmond Saunders recommended Crump as a writer to the Thunderbirds production team. Consequently, he penned two teleplays: "Operation Crash-Dive" and "The Duchess Assignment". The former served as a sequel to the pilot episode "Trapped in the Sky" while the latter is regarded for its quirky humour and guest character Deborah, the Duchess of Royston.

Afterwards, Crump returned to working as an editor on documentaries such as the notorious Yesterday's Men and editions of The Lively Arts until 1984.
