= Donald Robertson (writer) =

Scottish television scriptwriter (1930–1995)

- Born: 22 August 1930; Glasgow, Scotland
- Died: 5 September 1995 (aged 65); Manchester, England
- Occupation(s): Writer, engineer, cinefilm producer

Donald Robertson (22 August 1930 – 5 September 1995) was a Scottish engineer turned scriptwriter.

Robertson initially came to Birmingham around 1954 and got a job working as an assistant technical writer for a Midland firm around 1960. Two years later, he left the firm after becoming senior writer and decided to become a professional writer. After penning scripts for industrial films, Robertson wrote a draft script for Fireball XL5 (at which point the series had ended) to show off his skills. This led to him being invited to Slough six months later to attend the first script conference for Thunderbirds. As a result, he penned four episodes: "Edge of Impact", "Desperate Intruder", "Danger at Ocean Deep" and "Path of Destruction". Usually his stories revolved around machines and vehicles in peril.

Robertson wrote his scripts in a caravan parked at the end of his garden in Birmingham, finding it peaceful and quiet. His other TV work seemingly included Dr. Finlay's Casebook and Crossroads.

From the 1960s until his death, Robertson owned and managed Quill Productions. Originally a scriptwriting company, it went on to produce in-house training videos and corporate videos for big-name giants such as JCB, British Gas and Jaguar.
