= Attack of the Alligators! =

- Thunderbirds episode
- After an experimental food additive leaks into a swamp, the occupants of a house are terrorised by a group of monstrously enlarged alligators. While the episode has been praised for its story and production values, its use of live animals has attracted controversy.
- Episode no.: Series 1 Episode 24
- Directed by: David Lane
- Written by: Alan Pattillo
- Cinematography by: Paddy Seale
- Editing by: Harry Ledger
- Production code: 24
- Original air date: 10 March 1966

Guest character voices
- Sylvia Anderson as Mrs Files; Ray Barrett as Dr Orchard; David Graham as Culp; John Tate (uncredited) as Blackmer; Matt Zimmerman as Hector McGill

Episode chronology
← Previous "The Duchess Assignment"	Next → "The Cham-Cham"

"Attack of the Alligators!" is an episode of Thunderbirds, a British Supermarionation television series created by Gerry and Sylvia Anderson and filmed by their production company AP Films (APF) for ITC Entertainment. Written by Alan Pattillo and directed by David Lane, it was first broadcast on 10 March 1966 on ATV Midlands as the 23rd episode of Series One. It is the 24th episode in the official running order.

Set in the 2060s, the series follows the exploits of International Rescue, an organisation that uses technologically advanced rescue vehicles to save human life. The main characters are ex-astronaut Jeff Tracy, founder of International Rescue, and his five adult sons, who pilot the organisation's main vehicles: the Thunderbird machines. The plot of "Attack of the Alligators!" sees a group of alligators grow to enormous size after their swamp is contaminated by a new food additive. When the reptiles lay siege to a house, International Rescue is called in to save the trapped occupants.

Combining science fiction and haunted house themes, with a plot deliberately written to be "nightmarish", "Attack of the Alligators!" was filmed at APF Studios in Slough in late 1965. It was the first APF production to use live animals, the resized alligators being played by juvenile crocodiles. Filming of the episode was controversial as the crew resorted to using electric shocks to coax movement out of the animals. Concern for the crocodiles' welfare prompted an investigation by the Royal Society for the Prevention of Cruelty to Animals (RSPCA), which ultimately took no action against APF.

"Attack of the Alligators!" remains a favourite with Thunderbirds fans and commentators and is generally regarded as one of the series' best episodes. Along with "The Cham-Cham", the next episode to enter production, it went over-budget, causing the final instalment of Thunderbirds Series One ("Security Hazard") to be rewritten as a clip show to lower costs. In 1976, "Attack of the Alligators!" inspired an episode of The New Avengers titled "Gnaws", written by ex-Thunderbirds writer Dennis Spooner.

== Plot ==
A businessman, Blackmer, visits the reclusive Dr Orchard, a scientist who lives in a dilapidated house on the Ambro River. From the local plant Sidonicus americanus, Orchard has developed a food additive called "theramine" that increases the size of animals. Enlargement of animal stock presents a simple solution to world famine as well as other economic advantages. Blackmer's boatman, Culp, has been eavesdropping on the meeting. When a storm forces Blackmer to stay at the house overnight, Culp decides to steal the theramine and sell it to the highest bidder. Waiting until the house's other occupants are asleep, he breaks into Orchard's laboratory and pours some theramine into a vial; in the process, he accidentally tips some of the drug into a sink, washing it away into the Ambro River.

When Blackmer and Culp leave the next morning, their boat is attacked by an alligator, now enormous due to the theramine contamination. Orchard's assistant, Hector McGill, manages to rescue Blackmer but Culp is seemingly lost. The house is quickly surrounded by three giant alligators that repeatedly hurl themselves at the building with Orchard, Blackmer, McGill and the housekeeper, Mrs Files, trapped inside. At Mrs Files' suggestion, McGill transmits a distress call to International Rescue. This is picked up by John Tracy on the Thunderbird 5 space station and relayed to Tracy Island, where Jeff immediately dispatches his other four sons to the danger zone in Thunderbirds 1 and 2.

Arriving in Thunderbird 1 and transferring to a hover-jet, Scott fires the hover-jet's missile gun to disperse the alligators and accesses the house via the laboratory window. The room eventually caves in, forcing Scott and the others to retreat to the lounge. There, they are confronted by Culp, who holds them at gunpoint. Virgil, Alan and Gordon arrive in Thunderbird 2. Alan and Gordon man tranquiliser guns and subdue two of the alligators. When the third returns to the house, Alan exits Thunderbird 2 on another hover-jet to lure it away. He hits a tree and falls off the hover-jet but is saved by Gordon, who tranquilises the alligator before it reaches Alan.

Threatening to empty the entire theramine vial into the Ambro unless he is given safe passage upriver, Culp sets off in Blackmer's boat. At the same time, Gordon launches Thunderbird 4. A fourth, larger alligator appears and attacks the boat, killing Culp. Virgil disposes of the creature with a missile fired from Thunderbird 2. Gordon manages to recover the theramine vial intact on the riverbed. Back on Tracy Island, Jeff reveals that Blackmer and Orchard have announced that theramine will be subject to international security restrictions. Tin-Tin, who has been away on a shopping trip and missed the rescue, has bought Alan a present for his birthday – a pygmy alligator.

== Regular voice cast ==
- Ray Barrett as John Tracy
- Peter Dyneley as Jeff Tracy
- Christine Finn as Tin-Tin Kyrano and Grandma Tracy
- David Graham as Gordon Tracy and Brains
- David Holliday as Virgil Tracy
- Shane Rimmer as Scott Tracy
- Matt Zimmerman as Alan Tracy

== Production ==
The episode was partly inspired by H. G. Wells' 1904 novel The Food of the Gods and How It Came to Earth and its theme of animal size change. Another influence was the 1927 film The Cat and the Canary and its 1939 remake, both of which feature stalkers and a haunted house premise. In an interview, Gerry Anderson described housekeeper Mrs Files as a "Mrs Danvers-type character". Writer Alan Pattillo, who according to special effects supervisor Derek Meddings "had tried to come up with the most nightmarish rescue situation he could", had wanted to direct the episode as well. In the end, however, it was directed by David Lane. The opening scene features an insert shot of a stormy sky that later introduced the opening titles of The Prisoner.

"Attack of the Alligators!" was filmed in October and November 1965. The production overran its one-month schedule, forcing the crew to work extra hours, and sometimes long into the night, to finish the filming. Special effects assistant Ian Wingrove remembered that the episode's complex technical aspects had the crew "[working] day and night ... through a weekend". According to Lane, at one stage the shoot ran for 48 hours straight, with two editors processing the footage in shifts. He added: "I think Derek [Meddings] went three days, non-stop, just shooting."

The alligators in the episode were portrayed not by actual alligators, as Gerry Anderson had originally intended, but juvenile crocodiles. These were acquired from a private zoo in the north of England to double as the enlarged alligators on the episode's scale model sets and water tanks. The crocodiles that appear in the episode were three feet (0.91 m) long; a larger specimen, measuring five feet (1.5 m), was not used as it proved too aggressive to be taken out of its box. The crew kept the water tanks heated to a suitably warm temperature and used electric shocks to coax movement out of the crocodiles. The animals were unpredictable and difficult to control, either basking in the heat of the studio lights or disappearing into the tanks for hours at a time. To make them more visible to the cameras, the crew attached them to guiding rods and coordinated their movements. The use of live animals in both puppet and model shots required an unusually high level of collaboration between the puppet and effects crews.

I got a call from the operator to say that an RSPCA man had turned up ... He said, 'It's been reported that your boys are giving [the crocodiles] electric shocks,' and I said, 'Well, I didn't know that, but let's go on to the stage and have a look.' So we went on to the stage and he was very, very grave and terribly concerned, but then he saw one of the puppets and he said, 'You're not filming Thunderbirds are you? Oh, God, that's my favourite programme.' ... He ended up taking his annual leave and coming to the studio to work for us, and he was personally giving the crocodiles electric shocks.

— Gerry Anderson (2000)

Effects director Brian Johnson and several other crew members refused to take part on animal welfare grounds. Camera operator Alan Perry did not remember any of the crocodiles being mistreated; series supervising director Desmond Saunders, however, claimed that more than one specimen died of pneumonia after being left in an unheated tank overnight. Director David Elliott, though filming a different episode at the time, recalled that another dislocated one of its limbs after receiving an electric shock. Puppet operator Christine Glanville admitted that the filming could not have been pleasant for the crocodiles because the tanks contained "all sorts of dirty paint water, oil and soapy water to make it look swampy." Saunders commented: "It was scandalous. It was one of the great episodes. Nevertheless there was a price to be paid for it."

Animal cruelty concerns prompted an anonymous telephone call to the RSPCA, which dispatched an inspector to the studios. After a brief investigation, no action was taken against APF. This coincided with a decision to increase the voltage of the electric shocks to induce greater movement from the crocodiles. According to Gerry Anderson, when the inspector arrived, "Meddings explained that his team were laying the crocodiles down and they weren't doing anything. They were just lying there. The RSPCA man said, well, they would, because of the warmth of the lamps. So Derek said, 'We've been giving them a touch with an electrode just to make them move.' The guy asked what voltage they were using and Derek said it was about 20 volts, and the guy said, 'Oh, they've got terribly thick skins, you know. If you want them to move, you'll have to pump it up to 60.'" The inspector later joined the production to work alongside the crocodiles' handler.

Filming with the crocodiles was often hazardous. During a promotional photoshoot featuring Lady Penelope (who does not appear in the episode), one of the animals attacked the puppet and destroyed one of its legs. While filming a scene, Meddings was pulling one of the crocodiles towards him on a rope when the animal slid out of its harness. Meddings wrote of the incident: "My crew never saw me move as fast as I did to get out of the tank when I pulled the rope and realised the creature was free." Of the largest crocodile, which was kept at the back of the stage when not being used, Wingrove recalled: "You would forget that it was there, then one day someone shouted 'Look out!' and we turned round to see this big crocodile walking across the stage – which cleared of people very quickly!"

Both this episode and "The Cham-Cham", the next to enter production, overspent their budgets. This led the writers to rework the final episode of Thunderbirds Series One ("Security Hazard") as a clip show to reduce costs.

== Broadcast and reception ==
Originally transmitted on 10 March 1966, "Attack of the Alligators!" had its first UK-wide network broadcast on 20 March 1992 on BBC2. During that channel's 2000–2001 Thunderbirds rerun, the episode became the eleventh to be repeated when it replaced "Brink of Disaster", which along with "The Perils of Penelope" had been postponed until the end of the run due to similarities between the story and real-world events (both episodes feature dangerous situations involving trains and 2000 had seen several major railway accidents, most notably the Hatfield rail crash).

=== Critical response ===
It was the one episode that gave us so much trouble. We had to work night and day ... We had a lot of fun, but it was a lot of heartache trying to get [the crocodiles] to do what you wanted them to do.

— Derek Meddings (1993)

"Attack of the Alligators!" is a popular episode of Thunderbirds and is widely regarded as one of the series' best. It was well received by Sylvia Anderson, who described it as her favourite episode. Lew Grade, head of distributor ITC, expressed great satisfaction with the filming during a visit to APF Studios in 1965. Stephen La Rivière considers the story one of the most unusual of the series, while Peter Webber of DVD Monthly magazine calls the episode "just insane".

In 2004, "Attack of the Alligators!" was reissued on DVD in North America as part of A&E Video's The Best of Thunderbirds: The Favorite Episodes. Reviewing the release for the website DVD Verdict, David Gutierrez awarded "Attack of the Alligators!" a perfect score of 100, declaring it the best episode in the collection and praising its production values: "It's like a beautifully directed short film". He elaborated: "'Attack of the Alligators!' serves as a terrific example of how strong Thunderbirds can look. It's not Howdy Doody sporting a jetpack – it's an hour-long programme that feels like a motion picture."

Susanna Lazarus of Radio Times suggests that the episode is memorable specifically for its crocodile footage. The techniques used to produce the footage have caused the episode to be described as "controversial" by some sources. Mark Pickavance of the website Den of Geek criticises the footage from a visual standpoint, arguing that the use of scale sets with young crocodiles, "shot in super close-up to make them seem huge", does not produce a convincing illusion of giant alligators. Author Dave Thompson compares the giant reptiles to Swamp Thing, a superorganism featured in the DC Comics Universe.

Richard Farrell praises the episode as "one of the best remembered, albeit least typical, of International Rescue's adventures". Marcus Hearn suggests that the episode is praised for its effects but criticised for how the production's "painstaking approach paid dividends" in a scene where an alligator thrashes the house with its tail.

In 1976, Thunderbirds writer Dennis Spooner adapted the premise of "Attack of the Alligators!" while writing "Gnaws", an episode of The New Avengers featuring an enlarged rat.
