= Bob Bell (art director) =

British art director

- Born: Robert Bell; 1918
- Died: 6 June 2009 (aged 90–91)
- Occupation: Art director
- Years active: 1950–1990
- Employer: AP Films
- Television: Thunderbirds

Bob Bell (1918 – 6 June 2009) was an art director who worked on the television series Thunderbirds for AP Films (APF).

After the dissolution of APF, Bell served as art director on the films The Wild Geese (1978), Lion of the Desert (1981) and Friend or Foe (1982). He later worked on Nightbreed (1990) as a matte painter.

He died in hospital on 6 June 2009 following a prolonged illness.
