= Matt Zimmerman (actor) =

Canadian actor (1934–2022)

- Zimmerman in 2013
- Born: Matthew Zimmerman; 26 December 1934; Sudbury, Ontario, Canada
- Died: 9 June 2022 (aged 87)
- Education: London Academy of Music and Dramatic Art
- Occupation: Actor
- Years active: 1965–2015
- Television: Thunderbirds
- Spouse: Shirley Chapman (m. 1962; died 2002)

Matthew Zimmerman (26 December 1934 – 9 June 2022) was a Canadian actor. He was the voice of Alan Tracy in the 1960s television series Thunderbirds and sequel films Thunderbirds Are Go and Thunderbird 6.

== Life and career ==
Zimmerman was born in Sudbury, Ontario, on 26 December 1934. He was educated in Detroit, Michigan, United States, and started acting at an early age. He attended Bowling Green State University, Ohio, where he was a telecommunications major. Having won a scholarship, he moved to the United Kingdom in 1959 to study drama at the London Academy of Music and Dramatic Art (LAMDA), where he was a contemporary of Ed Bishop.

Zimmerman was cast as Alan Tracy in Thunderbirds after being recommended to producers Gerry and Sylvia Anderson by David Holliday, the voice of Virgil Tracy. In an interview, he remembered of his casting: "They were having great difficulty in casting the part of Alan Tracy as they wanted a certain sound for him ...As I walked in [Sylvia Anderson] looked at me and said, 'Don't talk! Oh, my god, you've got those big eyes and the cleft in the chin and the cheek bones, and if you were blond you'd look very much like Alan.' She said, 'Now, sit down. What's your name again?' And I said, 'My name is Matt Zimmerman and I'm from Detroit, Michigan,' and she said, 'That's the voice!' And that's how I got the job."

Besides voicing Alan, Zimmerman, like other actors on the series, also voiced various minor characters. He made a live-action appearance in one episode of UFO ("Exposed", 1970) among the Andersons' other TV productions.

He also starred as Shooty in The Hitchhiker's Guide to the Galaxy. Other TV appearances include T-Bag, Mike and Angelo, Crazy Like a Fox, Never the Twain, in addition to many commercials, most notably for Wrangler Jeans.

In 2015, Zimmerman appeared in the Thunderbirds reboot Thunderbirds Are Go; he played Professor Harold in the episode "Tunnels of Time".

Also a stage actor, he starred in plays such as Annie Get Your Gun, Anything Goes, Once in a Lifetime and West Side Story, and made his most recent West End appearance in Fiddler on the Roof at the Savoy Theatre in London. In 2008, he appeared in the touring cast of Cabaret, taking the role of Herr Schultz.

On 9 June 2022, it was announced that Zimmerman had died, at the age of 87.

== Filmography ==
- 1965–1966: Thunderbirds
- 1966: A Man for All Seasons
- 1966: Thunderbirds Are Go
- 1968: Thunderbird 6
- 1979: Birth of the Beatles
- 1979: Quincy's Quest
- 1986: Haunted Honeymoon
- 1987: Still Crazy Like a Fox
- 1988: Turn On To T-Bag
- 1989: The Forgotten
- 1995: Margaret's Museum
- 2015: Thunderbirds Are Go
