= Christine Finn =

English actress (1929–2007)

- As Barbara Judd in Quatermass and the Pit (1958–59)
- Born: 1929; Wellington, Madras, India
- Died: 5 December 2007 (aged 77); Guildford, Surrey, England
- Education: London Academy of Music and Dramatic Art
- Occupation: Actress
- Years active: 1940s–1970s
- Organization(s): Birmingham Repertory Theatre; Bristol Old Vic
- Television: Quatermass and the Pit; Thunderbirds
- Spouse: Alan Malcomson (m. 1961)

Christine L. T. Finn (1929 – 5 December 2007) was an English actress, known primarily for her role in the 1950s TV serial Quatermass and the Pit, and, after that, her voice work for the 1960s Thunderbirds television series. She also performed in film, radio and theatre in a career that started in the 1940s and lasted until the mid-1970s.

== Life and work ==
Finn was born and brought up in India. She moved to Britain in July 1946 aboard the Cunard ship RMS Scythia from Bombay, just before the end of British rule, and found a clerical job with the BBC. Noticed for a performance with the BBC Staff Amateur Company, she was then sent to the London Academy of Music and Dramatic Art (LAMDA). Her first professional work was a part in Edmond T. Gréville's film The Romantic Age (1949), followed by a juvenile lead in a tour of the play Random Harvest.

After joining the Birmingham Repertory Theatre, she remained in the company of actors for two years, departing with the role Lady Grey in Henry VI Part III at the Old Vic. A television role followed, as Mrs Crichton in Larger Than Life. At the Arts Theatre in London, she played Sybil Merton in the play Lord Arthur Savile's Crime. She returned to Birmingham to play David in The Boy David; then, back in London, as Ophelia in Hamlet and Olivia in Twelfth Night at the Central School of Speech and Drama's Embassy Theatre.

A small part in the film The Large Rope (1953) and a tour of the play Angels in Love followed, after which Finn joined the Bristol Old Vic. Her theatre work led to a role in the BBC Sunday Night Theatre production of A Midsummer Night's Dream in November 1958, in which she played Hermia. Soon afterwards, the director, Rudolph Cartier, cast her in the leading female role, Barbara Judd, in the science-fiction horror serial Quatermass and the Pit (1958–59).

Finn's career as a film actress, other than providing voices for two films based on Thunderbirds, did not develop further. During Hammer Films' preparations for a film version of Quatermass and the Pit, Barbara Shelley was cast as Judd, although Nigel Kneale, the writer of the Quatermass series, preferred Finn's performance. In a book about his work, written by Andy Murray, Kneale recalled: "I'd liked Christine very much ... but she wasn't the kind of screen star that Hammer wanted. So we got Barbara Shelley, who was taller".

Finn also performed as a voice actress, supplying the voices of Tin-Tin, Grandma Tracy and other characters in Thunderbirds (1965–66). She also starred in a number of radio plays from the end of the 1950s to the mid-1970s. During the final years of her career, she performed with voice actor Peter Tuddenham.

== Radio work ==
1959

- Lady Windermere's Fan by Oscar Wilde, with Catherine Lacey, John Humphry and Sylvia Coleridge.

1961

- The Sand Leopard by Berkely Mather with Neil McCallum

1963

- No Highway by Nevil Shute, with Nicolette Bernard and Virginia Winter.

1967

- Sort of Soufflé by Peter Bryant, with Peter Tuddenham
- That's Enough for the Present by John Hollis, with Peter Tuddenham and Sheila Grant

1970

- All Made Out of Ticky-Tacky by Gaie Houston, with Francis de Wolff and Peter Tuddenham

1971

- The Importance of Being Earnest by Oscar Wilde, with Dorothy Lane, John Rye and Peter Tuddenham

1973

- A Way With Women by Michael Brett, with Peter Tuddenham and Jan Edwards
- The Bashful Canary by Sheila Hodgson, with Miriam Margolyes and Peter Tuddenham

1974

- Bang Bang You're Dead adapted by Jill Hyem from a short story by Muriel Spark, with Elizabeth Morgan, Alan Dudley, David Timson, Grizelda Harvey, Hector Ross, Carole Boyd, John Rye, Sean Arnold and Peter Jefferson

== Theatre work ==
1952

- Beauty and the Beast by Nicholas Stuart Gray (Opened 22 December), as Mickey (Mercury Theatre, London)

1953

- Henry VI Part III as Lady Grey, from Shakespeare's Henry VI – Parts One, Two & Three (The Old Vic, London)
- Hamlet, 26 March (Embassy, London)

1954

- Winter Journey (Tuesday 23 February for three weeks), as Nancy Stoddard, an actress (Bristol, Theatre Royal)
- The Shoemaker's Holiday (Tuesday 16 March 1954 to Saturday 3 April), as Rose, Sir Roger Oatley's daughter (Bristol, Theatre Royal)
- The School for Wives (Tuesday 6 April 1954 to Saturday 1 May), as Agnes (Bristol, Theatre Royal)
- Murder in the Cathedral by T. S. Eliot (Tuesday 11 May to Saturday 29 May), as a Woman of Canterbury (Bristol, Theatre Royal)
- Salad Days (Tuesday 1 June to Saturday 19 June), as Fiona (Bristol, Theatre Royal)
- The Living Room by Graham Greene (Tuesday 22 June 1954 to Saturday 10 July), as Rose Pembertson (Bristol, Theatre Royal)
- Salad Days, 5 August (Vaudeville Theatre, London)

1959

- Sganarelle and Tartuffe by Molière (Opened 18 March; The Old Vic)
- The Importance of Being Earnest (The Old Vic)
- The Tempest, or The Enchanted Island (Opened 9 June; The Old Vic)
