= Thunderbirds (TV series) =

British science fiction television series (1965–1966)

- Genre: Science fiction; Action; Adventure; Family
- Created by: Gerry and Sylvia Anderson
- Voices of: Sylvia Anderson; Ray Barrett; Peter Dyneley; Christine Finn; David Graham; David Holliday; Shane Rimmer; Jeremy Wilkin; Matt Zimmerman; Paul Maxwell; John Tate; Bud Tingwell
- Opening theme: "The Thunderbirds March"
- Composer: Barry Gray
- Country of origin: United Kingdom
- Original language: English
- No. of series: 2
- No. of episodes: 32 (list of episodes)

Production
- Executive producer: Gerry Anderson (Series 2)
- Producers: Gerry Anderson (S. 1); Reg Hill (S. 2)
- Cinematography: John Read
- Running time: 50 minutes
- Production companies: AP Films; Associated Television

Original release
- Network: ITV
- Release: 30 September 1965 – 25 December 1966

Related
- Thunderbirds 2086; Thunderbirds Are Go; Captain Scarlet and the Mysterons; Terrahawks

Thunderbirds is a British science fiction television series created by Gerry and Sylvia Anderson, filmed by their production company AP Films (APF) and distributed by ITC Entertainment. It was filmed between 1964 and 1966 using a form of electronic marionette puppetry called "Supermarionation" combined with scale model special effects sequences. Two series, totalling 32 fifty-minute episodes, were made; production ended with the sixth episode of the second series after Lew Grade, APF's financial backer, failed in his efforts to sell the programme to US network television.

Set in the 2060s, Thunderbirds was a follow-up to the earlier Supermarionation productions Four Feather Falls, Supercar, Fireball XL5 and Stingray. It concerns the exploits of International Rescue, a life-saving organisation with a secret base on an island in the Pacific Ocean. International Rescue operates a fleet of technologically advanced rescue vehicles, headed by five craft called the Thunderbird machines. The main characters are the leader of International Rescue, ex-astronaut Jeff Tracy, and his five adult sons, who pilot the Thunderbirds.

Thunderbirds premiered in September 1965 on the ITV network and has since aired in at least 66 countries. Besides tie-in merchandise, it was followed by two feature films: Thunderbirds Are Go and Thunderbird 6. Periodically repeated, it was adapted for radio in the 1990s and has influenced many TV programmes and other media. Its other adaptations include an anime reimagining (Thunderbirds 2086), a live-action film (Thunderbirds) and a part-CGI, part-live-action remake (Thunderbirds Are Go). Three supplementary episodes, based on tie-in audio plays and made using the same puppet techniques as the original series, have also been produced.

Widely regarded as the Andersons' most popular and commercially successful series, Thunderbirds has been praised for its special effects, directed by Derek Meddings, and its musical score by Barry Gray. It is also remembered for its title sequence, which begins with an oft-quoted countdown by Jeff Tracy voice actor Peter Dyneley: "5, 4, 3, 2, 1 – Thunderbirds Are Go!" A real-life search and rescue service, the International Rescue Corps, was named after the organisation featured in the series.

== Premise ==
Set between 2065 and 2067, (Note: Although some sources (including Marriott 1993, pp. 114–121) indicate that Thunderbirds is set in the 2020s, Gerry Anderson confirmed that International Rescue is formed in 2065 (Hearn 2015, p. 46). Shots of props that point to settings other than the 2060s – such as a wall calendar indicating that the final episode, "Give or Take a Million", takes place in December 2026 – were dismissed by Anderson and art director Bob Bell as production design errors (Hearn 2015, p. 46).) Thunderbirds follows the exploits of the Tracy family, headed by American industrialist and ex-astronaut Jeff Tracy. Jeff is a widower with five adult sons: Scott, John, Virgil, Gordon and Alan. (Note: Listed by age, in descending order, as stated in Bentley 2005, pp. 53–57. According to Marriott 1993, pp. 116–117, Virgil is the second-oldest son and John the third-oldest.) The Tracys make up International Rescue, a secret organisation founded to save human life. They are aided in this mission by technologically advanced land, sea, air and space vehicles that are called into service when conventional rescue methods prove ineffective. The most important of these vehicles are the five "Thunderbird machines", each assigned to one of the five Tracy brothers:

- Thunderbird 1: a hypersonic rocket plane used for fast response and danger zone reconnaissance. Piloted by Scott, rescue co-ordinator.
- Thunderbird 2: a supersonic carrier aircraft which ferries supporting vehicles and equipment in detachable capsules called "pods". Piloted by Virgil.
- Thunderbird 3: a single-stage-to-orbit spacecraft. Piloted alternately by Alan and John, with Scott as co-pilot.
- Thunderbird 4: a utility submersible. Piloted by Gordon and usually launched from Thunderbird 2.
- Thunderbird 5: a space station in Earth orbit that relays distress calls from around the world. Manned alternately by "space monitors" John and Alan.

The family live on Tracy Island, International Rescue's secret base of operations in the South Pacific Ocean. They own a luxurious villa that they share with four other people: Grandma Tracy, Jeff's mother; scientist and engineer Brains, who designed the Thunderbird machines; Brains' assistant Tin-Tin, who is also Alan's girlfriend; and Tin-Tin's father Kyrano, the Tracys' retainer. (Note: The names "Tracy Island" and "Hood" are not used in the TV series, appearing only in tie-in media.) In this remote location, International Rescue is safe from criminals and spies who envy its technology and attempt to acquire the secrets of the Thunderbird machines.

Some of International Rescue's operations are triggered not by innocent misadventure, but rather sabotage or criminal negligence. For missions involving undercover work, the organisation incorporates a network of field agents led by English aristocrat Lady Penelope Creighton-Ward and her butler Aloysius Parker. Based at Creighton-Ward Mansion in Kent, Penelope and Parker travel in FAB 1: a specially modified, pink Rolls-Royce. International Rescue members acknowledge orders with the expression "FAB" (a shortening of the 1960s buzzword "fabulous", spoken as an initialism: "F-A-B").

International Rescue's most persistent opponent is a master criminal known as The Hood. Based in a temple in Malaysia, and possessing powers of hypnosis and dark magic, The Hood exerts telepathic control over Kyrano, his estranged half-brother, and manipulates the Tracys into rescues that unfold according to his own designs. This gives him opportunities to spy on the Thunderbird machines and, by selling their secrets, make himself rich.

== Production ==
=== Development ===
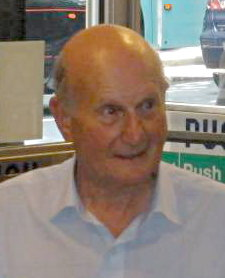
Gerry Anderson, series co-creator

Thunderbirds was the fifth series to be co-created by Gerry Anderson and filmed by his production company APF, whose studios were located on the Slough Trading Estate. Pitched in 1963, the series was commissioned by Lew Grade of ITC, APF's parent company, following the commercial success of Stingray.

The series' premise was inspired by the West German mining rescue known as the "Wunder von Lengede" (Miracle of Lengede). In October 1963, the collapse of a nearby dam flooded an iron mine in the municipality of Lengede, trapping 50 men underground. Efforts to save them were hampered by the length of time it took to bring rescue equipment to the site. Lacking the means to drill an escape shaft, the authorities were forced to requisition a heavy-duty bore from Bremen, more than 80 miles (130 km) away, and transport it to Lengede by train, in a journey that took eight hours. In the end, 21 miners were saved and the other 29 died. Seeing the advantages of faster emergency response, Anderson came up with the idea of an "international rescue" organisation that uses supersonic aircraft to transport equipment quickly over long distances.

Wanting to set this concept apart from APF's earlier productions, Anderson tried to pitch the stories at a level that would appeal to both adults and children. Whereas earlier series had aired in afternoon children's timeslots, Anderson wanted Thunderbirds to be shown during the evening to attract a wider family audience. Series co-creator Sylvia Anderson recalled that "our market had grown and a 'kidult' show [...] was the next step." The Andersons retired to their holiday villa in Portugal to expand the premise, script the pilot episode and compose a writers' guide. According to Sylvia, the writing process entailed a "division of labour", whereby Gerry devised the action sequences and she handled characterisation. The decision to make a father and his sons the main characters was influenced by the premise of Bonanza, as well as Sylvia's belief that the use of more than one heroic character would broaden the series' appeal. The Tracy brothers were named after Mercury Seven astronauts: Scott Carpenter, John Glenn, Virgil "Gus" Grissom, Gordon Cooper and Alan Shepard.

I started to think that there really ought to be dumps around the world with rescue gear standing by, so that when a disaster happened, all these items of rescue equipment could be rushed to the disaster zone and used to help to get people out of trouble [...] I was thinking, 'Rescue, yes, rescue, but how to make it science fiction? What about an international rescue organisation?'

— Gerry Anderson on the premise

The series' title was derived from a letter Gerry had received during World War II from his brother Lionel, an RAF flight sergeant based overseas. While stationed in Arizona, Lionel had made reference to Thunderbird Field, a nearby United States Army Air Forces base. Drawn to the "punchiness" of "Thunderbirds", Anderson renamed the series, whose working title had been "International Rescue", as well as the star vehicles, which had initially been designated Rescues 1 to 5. His inspiration for the launch sequences of Thunderbirds 1, 2 and 3 came from contemporary US Air Force launch procedure: Anderson had learnt how the Strategic Air Command kept pilots on permanent standby, seated in the cockpits of their aircraft, ready for take-off at a moment's notice.

In the DVD documentary The Thunderbirds Companion, Anderson explained how rising production costs made overseas distribution particularly important and essentially caused Thunderbirds to be made "as an American show". During the characterisation and casting process, the Andersons' top priority was to give the series transatlantic appeal, increasing the chances of securing a US network deal and the larger audiences that the American market had to offer. Additionally, the scripts were typed on US-standard Letter paper and used American spelling, in order to make it appear as though the scripts were written by Americans.

=== Casting and characters ===
Main characters
Name	Role(s)	Voiced by
Jeff Tracy	Leader of International Rescue	Peter Dyneley
Scott Tracy	Thunderbird 1 pilot Thunderbird 3 co-pilot (Note: It is stated in one episode, "The Uninvited", that Scott occasionally mans Thunderbird 5 (Bentley 2005, p. 53).)	Shane Rimmer
Virgil Tracy	Thunderbird 2 pilot	David Holliday (Series 1); Jeremy Wilkin (Series 2)
Alan Tracy	Thunderbird 3 astronaut Thunderbird 5 Space Monitor	Matt Zimmerman (Note: Zimmerman was cast after the dialogue recording for the pilot, "Trapped in the Sky", in which Alan was voiced by Ray Barrett (Bentley 2005, p. 63).)
Gordon Tracy	Thunderbird 4 aquanaut Thunderbird 2 co-pilot	David Graham
John Tracy	Thunderbird 5 Space Monitor; Thunderbird 3 astronaut	Ray Barrett
Brains	Tracy Island's resident engineer and scientist	David Graham
Tin-Tin Kyrano	Maintenance technician Laboratory assistant	Christine Finn
Kyrano	Manservant and cook on Tracy Island	David Graham
Grandma Tracy	Housekeeper and cook on Tracy Island	Christine Finn
Lady Penelope	International Rescue's London agent	Sylvia Anderson
Aloysius Parker	Penelope's butler and chauffeur	David Graham
The Hood	Criminal and International Rescue's arch-enemy	Ray Barrett

British, Canadian and Australian actors formed most of the voice cast. To ensure transatlantic appeal, it had been decided that most of the main characters would be American; therefore, it was essential that the actors put on convincing accents. The only American actor on the cast was David Holliday, who had been spotted in London's West End and cast as Virgil Tracy. Following the completion of Series One, Holliday returned to the US. For Series Two and the feature films, Virgil was voiced by Jeremy Wilkin.

British actor David Graham was among the first to be cast. He had previously voiced characters in Four Feather Falls, Supercar, Fireball XL5 and Stingray. Outside APF's productions, he had supplied one of the original Dalek voices on Doctor Who. Cast at the same time as Graham was Australian actor Ray Barrett. Like Graham, he had worked for the Andersons before, having voiced Titan and Commander Shore in Stingray. With experience in radio drama, Barrett could perform a wide range of voices and accents in quick succession. Conscious of Cold War political sensitivities and not wanting to "perpetuate the idea that Russia was the enemy with a whole generation of children watching", Gerry Anderson decided that The Hood (voiced by Barrett) should be Asian and placed his temple hideout in Malaysia to defy viewer expectations.

Although Lady Penelope and Parker (the latter voiced by Graham) were among the first characters to be developed, they were not conceived as main characters. Parker's Cockney accent was based on the mannerisms of a waiter at a pub in Cookham that the Andersons sometimes visited. On Gerry's recommendation, Graham started making trips to the pub to pick up the accent. Anderson's first choice for Penelope had been Fenella Fielding, but Sylvia insisted on taking the part herself. Her Penelope voice was intended to emulate Fielding and Joan Greenwood. On Penelope and Parker's secondary role as comic relief, Gerry explained, "We British can laugh at ourselves, so therefore we had Penelope and Parker as this comedy team. And in America they love the British aristocracy too."

As well as Jeff Tracy, English-Canadian actor Peter Dyneley voiced recurring character Commander Norman, chief of air traffic control at London Airport. Many of Dyneley's guest characters were upper-class Englishmen. Shane Rimmer, the voice of Scott, was cast based on his performance as Russell Corrigan in the BBC soap opera Compact. Fellow Canadian Matt Zimmerman, who was acting in the West End, was hired at a late stage in the casting process. He was given the role of Alan on the recommendation of his friend, Holliday: "They were having great difficulty casting the part of Alan as they wanted a certain sound for him, being the youngest brother. David, who [was] a bit older than I am, told them that he had this friend, me, who would be great."

Christine Finn, known for her role in the TV serial Quatermass and the Pit, provided the voices of Tin-Tin Kyrano and Grandma Tracy. Together with Sylvia Anderson, she was also responsible for voicing most of the female and child guest characters. Some small roles were played by Paul Maxwell, John Tate and Bud Tingwell; Maxwell and Tingwell joined the cast in Series Two after working on Thunderbirds Are Go. None of the three were credited for their performances.

Dialogue recording was supervised by the Andersons and associate producer Reg Hill, with Sylvia Anderson in overall charge of voice casting. There was one recording session a month and the cast acted out two scripts at each session. Guest parts were not assigned by the producers, but rather negotiated among the actors. Villains of the week were typically voiced by either Barrett or Graham. Two recordings would be taken: one to be converted into electronic pulses for the puppet filming, the other to be added to the soundtrack in post-production. The tapes were edited at Gate Recording Theatre in Birmingham.

=== Design and effects ===
==== Puppets ====
Since we always tried to minimise walking, we'd show the puppets taking one step only, then promptly cut. Through interspersing the programmes with "meanwhile" scenes – that is, showing what else was going on in the story at the same time – we would then cut back to the puppet who was now already in his craft.

— Writer and director Alan Pattillo discussing how the puppets were filmed

The lead puppet sculptors were Christine Glanville and Mary Turner, who also served as lead puppet operators. Glanville and Turner's team built the 13 members of the main cast in six months at a cost of between £250 and £300 per puppet (about £4,400 and £5,300 in 2025). As pairs of episodes were being filmed simultaneously on separate stages, the characters were sculpted in duplicate. The puppets had replaceable heads with different facial expressions: in addition to a blank-looking "normal" head, each main character was given a "smiler", a "frowner" and a "blinker". The finished puppets were about 22 inches (56 cm) tall, or 1/3 adult human height.

Each puppet had more than 30 individual components, the most important being the solenoid – located inside the puppet's head – that synchronised the movements of the flexible lower lip with the syllables in the character's pre-recorded dialogue. The head had to be large enough to accommodate the solenoid, causing the torso and limbs to look disproportionately small. The puppets' likenesses and mechanics are fondly remembered by crew member Wanda Brown, who preferred the Thunderbirds puppets to the accurately proportioned ones that made their debut in Captain Scarlet: "The [Thunderbirds] puppets were easier to operate and more enjoyable because they had more character to them [...] Even some of the more normal-looking faces, such as Scott and Jeff, for me had more character than the puppets in the series that came afterwards." Rimmer speaks positively of the puppets' still being "very much caricatures", since it made them "more lovable and appealing [...] There was a naive quality about them and nothing too complex."

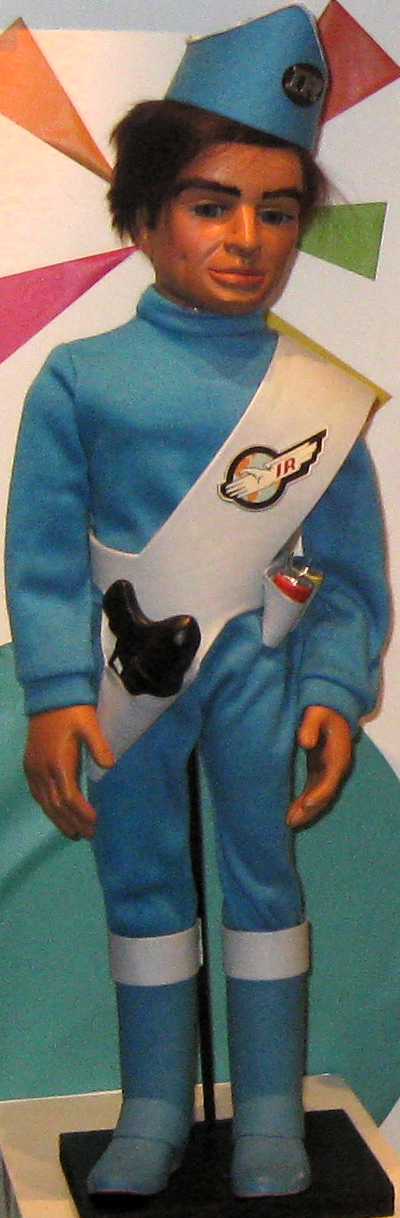
Replica Scott Tracy. The puppets' heads were oversized to accommodate the electronics powering their lip movements.

The faces of the main characters were based on those of real-life actors and entertainers, often selected from the Spotlight casting directory. According to Glanville, APF wanted to give the Thunderbirds characters "more natural" looks to distinguish them from the deliberate caricatures of its earlier series. Jeff Tracy was modelled on Lorne Greene, Scott on Sean Connery, Alan on Robert Reed, John on Adam Faith and Charlton Heston, Brains on Anthony Perkins and Parker on Ben Warriss. After several test heads were rejected, Turner modelled Lady Penelope on Sylvia Anderson, the character's voice actress. Anderson was initially unaware of this.

The heads of the main characters were first sculpted in either Plasticine or clay. Once the features had been finalised, this served as the template for a silicone rubber mould. This was coated with Bondaglass (fibreglass mixed with resin) and enhanced with Bondapaste, a putty-like substance, to accentuate its contours. The Bondaglass shell was then fitted with the solenoid, plastic eyes and leather mouth parts, as well as incisor teeth – a first for a Supermarionation production. Supporting characters were played by puppets known as "revamps", which had plastic heads. These marionettes started their working lives with only a mouth and eyes; their faces were remoulded from one episode to the next. The most striking moulds were retained and, as their numbers increased, photographed to compile an internal casting directory.

Wigs were made of mohair or, in the case of the Penelope puppet, human hair. Bodies were built in three sizes: "large male" (for the Tracys and The Hood), "small male" and "small female". Sylvia Anderson, who was also lead costume designer, devised the main characters' attire. To increase the puppets' mobility, the costume department avoided using stiff synthetic materials, opting for cotton, silk and wool instead. Between 1964 and 1966, the department's stock comprised more than 700 costumes.

Each puppet's head was fitted with around ten fine tungsten steel wires. During filming, dialogue was played into the studio on modified tape recorders that converted the feed into electronic pulses. Two of the wires relayed these pulses down to the solenoid, completing the Supermarionation process. The wires, which were sprayed black to reduce their visibility, were made even less noticeable by applying powder paint matching the background colours of the set. Glanville explained the time-consuming nature of this process: "[The puppeteers] used to spend over half an hour on each shot getting rid of these wires, looking through the camera, puffing a bit more [paint] here, anti-flare there; and, I mean, it's very depressing when somebody will say to us, 'Of course the wires showed.'" Positioned on an overhead gantry with handheld cruciforms, the puppeteers coordinated their movements with the help of a viewfinder-powered CCTV feedback system. As filming progressed, the crew began to dispense with wires and instead manipulate puppets from the studio floor using rods.

Due to their low weight, as well as the fact that each of their legs had only one control wire, the puppets were unable to walk convincingly. Scenes involving movement were filmed from the waist up, with a puppeteer holding the legs out of shot and using a "bobbing" action to simulate walking or running. Dynamic shots could also be eliminated altogether: in an interview with New Scientist, director of photography John Read discussed the advantages of bypassing the puppets' lack of agility – so that they "appear, for example, to walk through doors (although the control wires make this impossible) or pick up a coffee cup (although their fingers are not in fact jointed)." If particularly dexterous actions were required, the crew would film close-up inserts of a colleague's hands interacting with full-size props.

==== Production design ====
The puppet stages were one-fifth the size of those used for a standard live-action production, typically measuring 12 by 14 metres (39 by 46 ft) with a three-metre-high (9.8 ft) ceiling. As the art department's sets needed to conform to the effects department's scale model designs, each team closely monitored the other's work. According to Sylvia Anderson, art director Bob Bell's challenge was to produce complex interiors on a limited budget while resisting the effects team's push for "more extravagant" design. This task was complicated by the unnatural proportions of the puppets: Bell struggled to decide whether the scales should match their bodies or their oversized heads and hands. He used FAB 1 to illustrate the problem: "As soon as we positioned [the puppets] standing alongside [the model], they looked ridiculous, as the car towered over them." He finally adopted a "mix-and-match" approach, by which smaller items, such as tableware, were scaled to their hands and furniture to their bodies.

While designing the Creighton-Ward Mansion sets, Bell and his team strove for authenticity, ordering miniature Tudor-style paintings, 1/3-scale Georgian- and Regency-style furniture, and carpeting in the shape of a polar bear skin. This realism was enhanced by adding scrap items acquired from electronics shops and household waste. For example, Virgil Tracy's launch chute was originally the pipe on a vacuum cleaner.

==== Special effects ====
The special effects in every APF series from Supercar to UFO were directed by Derek Meddings, who later supervised effects on James Bond and Superman films. Realising that Thunderbirds would be the "biggest project [APF] had worked on", Meddings knew that the effects department needed expansion. He therefore created a second unit, led by his assistant Brian Johncock, and a third unit to film model aircraft. This increased APF's total number of crews and filming stages to five each. A typical episode contained around 100 effects shots, with Meddings' team completing up to 18 a day.

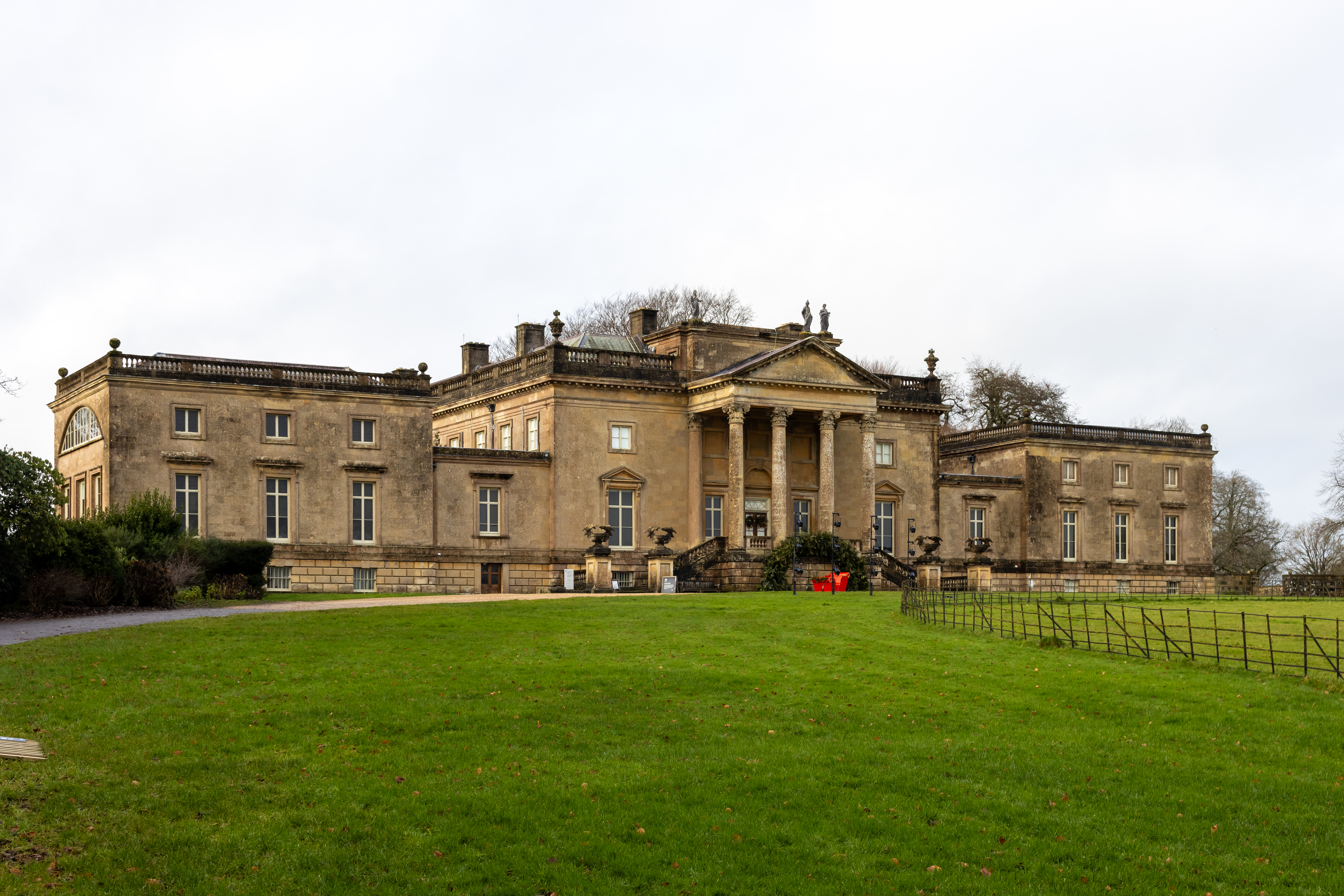
Creighton-Ward Mansion was modelled on Stourhead House, an 18th‑century Palladian building.

An addition to the team was Mike Trim, who assisted Meddings in designing the futuristic vehicles and buildings of Thunderbirds. Together, Meddings and Trim pioneered an "organic" design technique that involved embellishing models using parts from children's toys and off-the-shelf model kits. Models and sets were also "dirtied down" with powder paint or pencil lead to create a "used" look. Toy cars and vans were used when filming vehicles in long shot, and vehicles built in-house were equipped with basic steering and suspension for added realism. To simulate dust trails, the crew fitted the vehicles' undersides with miniature fans and Jetex pellets that emitted chemical exhaust or jets of air. Another of Meddings' inventions was a closed, cyclical effects stage nicknamed the "rolling road": consisting of two or more loops of canvas running at different speeds, this device allowed shots of moving vehicles to be filmed on a static set to make efficient use of the limited studio space. Airborne aircraft shots were mounted against a "rolling sky", with smoke fanned across the stage to simulate passing clouds.

One of Meddings' first tasks was to film stock footage of the Thunderbird machines and the main locations, Tracy Island and Creighton-Ward Mansion. The finished island model was a composite of more than a dozen smaller sets, each of which could be detached from the whole and filmed separately. The mansion was based on the Palladian house at Stourhead in Wiltshire. In the absence of Reg Hill, the lead designer on APF's earlier productions, Meddings was additionally tasked with designing the five Thunderbirds and FAB 1. The filming models of the six vehicles were built by a contractor, Master Models of Middlesex. Models and puppet sets combined, more than 200 versions of the Thunderbird machines were built for the series.

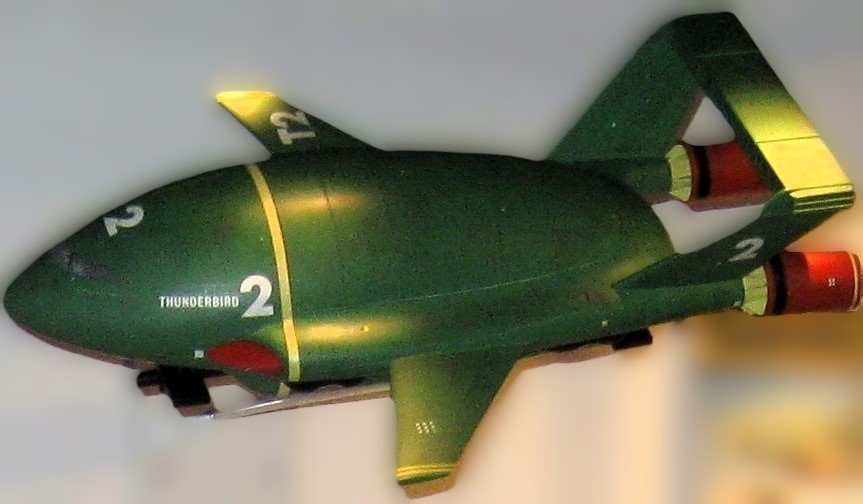
A replica Thunderbird 2 model. The aircraft was given forward-swept wings to make it more distinctive.

During the design and filming process, Meddings' priorities were realism and credibility. With the exception of Thunderbird 5, each vehicle was built in three or four scales. Thunderbird 1's swing-wing design was motivated by Meddings' wish to come up with something "more dynamic" than a conventional fixed-wing aircraft. He was unhappy with the Thunderbird 2 prototype until he inverted the wings to be forward-swept. This decision was not based on any expert knowledge of aerodynamics; in Meddings' words: "[A]t the time, all aircraft had swept-back wings. I only did it to be different." He described the Thunderbird 2 launch as "probably the most memorable" sequence that his team devised for any of APF's productions.

The basic form of Thunderbird 3 was influenced by the Soyuz rocket. The largest of the spacecraft's filming models was six feet (1.8 m) tall. Ocean scenes featuring Thunderbird 4 were particularly difficult to film due to the mismatched scales of the model and the water in the shooting tank. The crew used creative camera angles and fast cutting to give these shots a sense of realistic perspective. Thunderbird 5, which Meddings found the hardest to design, was based on the shape of the Tracy Island Round House. With stock footage providing most of the space station's appearances, the model was rarely filmed. Pod Vehicles were designed episode by episode and were built from balsa wood, Jelutong wood or fibreglass. To save time and costs, some minor vehicles were built entirely out of parts from radio-controlled model kits.

As the Penelope and Parker puppets needed to fit inside it, the largest model of all was the seven-foot-long (2.1 m) FAB 1, which cost £2,500 to build (about £44,000 in 2025). The car's name and colour were chosen by Sylvia Anderson. Rolls-Royce Ltd supervised the construction of the plywood model and supplied APF with a genuine radiator grille for close-ups of the front of the car. In return for its cooperation, the company asked APF to add a miniature Spirit of Ecstasy and ensure that character dialogue refer to the car's make by its full name, "Rolls-Royce", not the abbreviation "Rolls". In spite of this, Jeff Tracy refers to FAB 1 as "the Rolls" in the episode The Impostors.

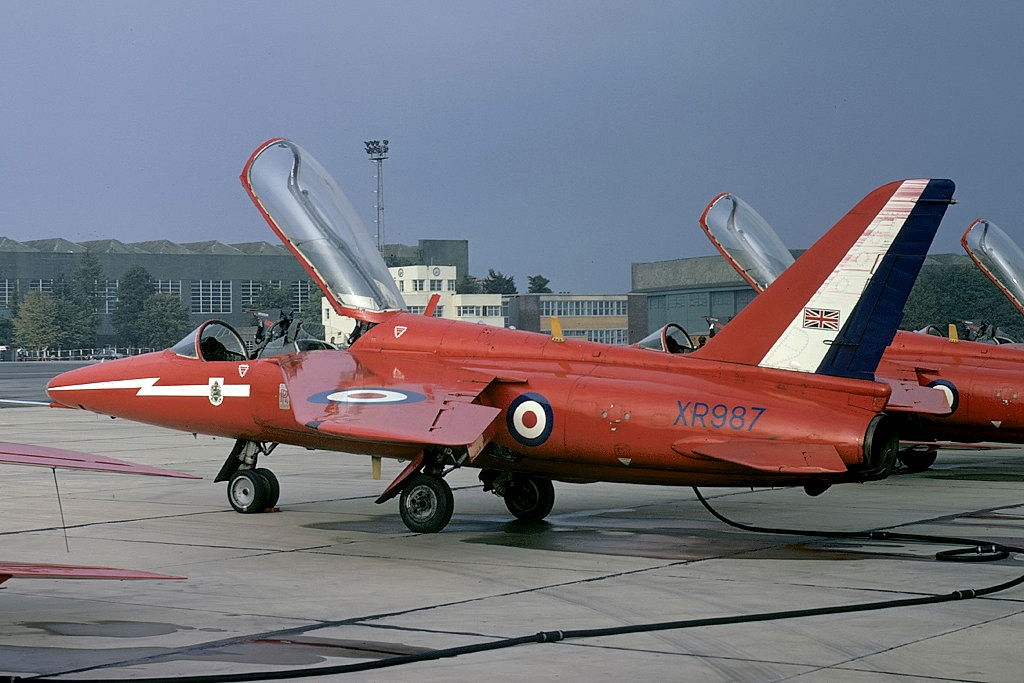
Some of the aircraft sound effects were created by recording the Red Arrows display team in flight.

Scale explosions were created using substances such as fuller's earth, petrol gel, magnesium strips and Cordtex explosive. They were filmed at high speed – up to 120 frames per second (fps) – then slowed down to the standard 24 fps to give an impression of greater weight and scale. Gunpowder canisters were ignited to create rocket jets. The wires that electrically fired the rockets also allowed one of the crew, holding a cruciform and stationed on a platform over the stage, to "fly" the model across the set. The most unwieldy model was Thunderbird 2, which Meddings remembered as being "awful" to fly. There were frequent problems with unreliable rockets or weak wiring: if the rockets were slow to ignite, the current quickly caused the wires to overheat and snap, potentially damaging the model and setting fire to the scenery. Conditions on the overhead platform were often dangerous due to the heat and smoke. Though many of the rocket exhaust sound effects were taken from an audio library, some were specially recorded at a Red Arrows display at RAF Little Rissington.

Critic David Garland suggests that the challenge facing the effects department was to strike a balance between the "conventional science fiction imperative of the 'futuristic'" and the "seeping hyper-realist concerns mandated by the Andersons' approach to the puppets". Thunderbirds has been praised for the quality of its effects. Jim Sangster and Paul Condon, authors of Collins Telly Guide, call the miniature model-work "uniformly impressive". To Paul Cornell, Martin Day and Keith Topping, the effects were "way beyond anything seen on TV previously". Impressed by their work on Thunderbirds, Stanley Kubrick hired several of Meddings' team as effects supervisors on 2001: A Space Odyssey.

==== Title sequence ====
The title sequence, storyboarded by Gerry Anderson, opens with the following countdown: "5, 4, 3, 2, 1 – Thunderbirds Are Go!", provided by Peter Dyneley as Jeff Tracy. In a departure from APF's earlier series, each episode's titles include a story preview in the form of a fast-paced action montage. Simon Archer and Marcus Hearn compare this device favourably to a film trailer.

The montage is followed by introductions for each of the Tracy brothers plus Brains and Lady Penelope, the characters' portraits being superimposed on various vehicles and settings. John Peel describes this as "ostensibly a return to the 'series stars' concept long known in TV"; Garland states that the imagery demonstrates Anderson's commitment to "incremental realism" through convergence of human and puppet characteristics. Jonathan Bignell suggests that the use of portraits conveys Anderson's partiality to "visual revelation of machines and physical action".

According to Daniel O'Brien, author of SF:UK: How British Science Fiction Changed the World, the title sequence encapsulates the reasons behind Thunderbirds' enduring popularity. Dyneley's countdown is particularly well remembered and has been widely quoted. Dean Newman of the Syfy channel ranks Thunderbirds eighth in a list of "Top 10 TV title sequences", while Den of Geek's Martin Anderson considers the sequence the best of any TV series.

=== Writing and filming ===
==== Series One ====
Thunderbirds was filmed at APF's Slough studios between 1964 and 1966. In preparation for the new production, the company increased the number of full-time crew to 100. Shooting on Series One began in September 1964 after five months of pre-production. Due to the series' technical complexity, this was a period longer than for any of the earlier productions. To speed up the filming, episodes were shot in pairs on separate stages and by separate crews, designated "A" and "B". By 1964, APF was the UK's largest commercial user of colour film, consuming more than three million feet (570 mi; 910 km) of stock per year.

Like their previous three series, the Andersons devised Thunderbirds as a 25-minute show. In late 1964, Alan Pattillo, a long-time writer and director for APF, became the company's first official script editor. This reduced the burden on Gerry Anderson, who had grown weary of revising the scripts himself. Direction of episodes was assigned in pairs: veterans Pattillo and David Elliott alternated with the less-experienced Desmond Saunders and newcomer David Lane for each month's filming. Due to the complexities of setting up takes, progress was slow: even on a productive day, the crew could rarely complete more than two minutes of puppet footage. In an interview, Hill pointed out that Thunderbirds contained several times as many shots as a typical live-action series. He explained that fast cutting was needed as the puppets' lack of facial expressions made it difficult to keep the audience's interest for more than a few seconds at a time.

Lew watched ["Trapped in the Sky"] and at the end he jumped up shouting, 'Fantastic, absolutely fantastic! This isn't a television series – this is a feature film! You've got to make this as an hour!' [...] I'm glad we did it, because it made the series much bigger and much more important. But it was still a very, very difficult job.

— Gerry Anderson on the format change

On viewing the finished pilot, "Trapped in the Sky", Grade was so impressed with the series that he told Anderson to extend each episode from 25 to 50 minutes – long enough to fill a one-hour commercial timeslot. He also increased each episode's budget from £25,000 to £38,000. As a result, Thunderbirds became not only APF's longest and highest-budgeted production, but also one of the most expensive TV series ever made up to that time. The total budget for the 26-episode Series One was about £1 million (roughly £17 million in 2025).

The production, which had been shooting two 25-minute episodes every two weeks, faced significant challenges in the transition to the new format: nine episodes had already been fully or partly filmed, scripts for ten more had been written, and major rewrites would be needed to satisfy the longer running time. Anderson lamented: "Our time-scale was far too drawn out. ITC's New York office insisted that they should have one show a fortnight [...] Everything had to move at twice the speed." APF spent more than seven months extending the existing episodes. It then filmed the new 50-minute format at a rate of two episodes every four weeks.

Tony Barwick, who had impressed Pattillo and the Andersons with an unsubmitted script he had written for Danger Man, was recruited to assist in writing subplots and filler material to lengthen the episodes. He found that the new format created opportunities to strengthen the characterisation. Peel suggests that "small character touches" make the puppet cast of Thunderbirds "much more rounded" than those of APF's earlier series. He compares the writing favourably to that of live-action drama. The added footage proved useful during the development of the final episode of Series One, "Security Hazard": as the previous two episodes – "Attack of the Alligators!" and "The Cham-Cham" – had overspent their budgets, Pattillo lowered the finale's costs by writing it as a clip show, dominated by flashbacks to the series' early episodes and comprising just 17 minutes of new material. Filming of Series One was completed in December 1965.

==== Series Two ====
The second series was ordered in late 1965 and began filming in March 1966, together with Thunderbirds Are Go. While Bob Bell and Derek Meddings concentrated on the feature film, leadership of the art and special effects departments passed to Keith Wilson and effects camera operator Jimmy Elliott. Barwick became a full-time member of the writing staff and took over the role of script editor from the outgoing Pattillo.

During pre-production, the art department expanded some of the permanent sets, such as the Tracy Villa lounge and the Thunderbird 5 control room. Additionally, the main puppets and vehicles were rebuilt. By this time, the Thunderbird 2 flying model had been damaged so many times that a replacement was needed. Meddings was displeased with the new model, commenting that it was "not only the wrong colour, it was a completely different shape [...] I never felt our model-makers managed to recapture the look of the original."

To accommodate the simultaneous shooting of the TV series and film, APF purchased two more buildings on the Slough Trading Estate to create additional studio space. As resources were divided between the two productions, filming of the TV series progressed at half the previous speed, with B Crew shooting one episode a month. Filming on Thunderbirds Are Go was completed by June, allowing A Crew to resume work on the series and shoot what would prove to be its penultimate episode, "Ricochet".

=== Music ===
The score was composed by Barry Gray, who was the musical director on all the Andersons' productions from Four Feather Falls to the first series of Space: 1999. Instructed by Gerry to give the opening theme a "military feel", Gray produced a brass-heavy instrumental called "The Thunderbirds March", recorded in December 1964 at London's Olympic Studios. The closing credits were initially set to be accompanied by a song: "Flying High", performed by Gary Miller with backing vocals by Ken Barrie. Ultimately, a variation of the march was used instead. The incidental music for the episodes was recorded over nine months, between March and December 1965. As most of the music budget was spent on the earlier episodes, later instalments were more reliant on stock tracks from APF's music library.

Peel describes "The Thunderbirds March" as "one of the best TV themes ever written – perfect for the show and catchy when heard alone". Morag Reavley of BBC Online argues that the piece is "up there [...] in the quintessential soundtrack of the Sixties" along with the James Bond films and the songs of Frank Sinatra, Elvis and The Beatles. More generally, he praises the series' "catchy, pulse-quickening tunes", as well as Gray's aptitude for "musical nuance" and genre-mixing. Heather Phares of AllMusic considers "Thunderbirds Are Go!" – the track accompanying the launch sequences of Thunderbirds 1, 2 and 3 – to be a reflection of the mod aspect of 1960s British spy fiction. She also highlights Gray's homage to – and divergence from – musical norms, commenting that his work "sends up the spy and action/adventure conventions of the '60s very stylishly and subtly". In 2021, Classic FM listeners and Radio Times readers voted "The Thunderbirds March" as the 19th-greatest TV theme of all time.

David Huckvale identifies Wagnerian homage in both the theme music and the series' premise. Writing that the effect of the opening string ostinato is similar to that of the motif in Ride of the Valkyries, he also likens the Thunderbird machines to Valkyries themselves: "Their function is more benevolent than those warrior maidens, but they do hover over danger, death and destruction." Kevin J. Donnelly of the University of Southampton acknowledges the series' "big-sounding orchestral score", which he compares to that of a live-action film. He also suggests that part of the music's function is to distract from the physical imperfections of the puppets.

=== Cancellation ===
Production of Thunderbirds ended in August 1966 with the completion of the sixth episode of Series Two. In February that year, it had been reported that Grade had failed to sell the series in the US after disagreements with American broadcasters over proposed timeslots. In July, he cancelled Thunderbirds following another failed attempt to secure a US buyer. The "big three" American networks – NBC, CBS and ABC – had all made bids for the series, with Grade repeatedly upping the price. When NBC withdrew its bid, so did the others.

By the time of its cancellation, Thunderbirds had become highly popular in the UK and was being distributed widely overseas. However, Grade believed that without the financial boost of an American network sale, a full second series of episodes would fail to recoup its production costs. He therefore instructed Gerry Anderson to devise a new concept, which he hoped would stand a better chance of winning over the profitable US market. This became Captain Scarlet and the Mysterons.

== Broadcast history ==
The first episode of Thunderbirds premiered on 30 September 1965 on the ATV Midlands, Westward and Channel franchises of the ITV network. Other franchises, including ATV London and Granada, began transmitting the series the following month. To help ensure family appeal, many areas showed the programme during prime time, typically in a 7.00 p.m. slot. The final episode – the Christmas-themed "Give or Take a Million" – was first broadcast on 25 December 1966. Like other UK series filmed in colour during the mid-1960s, Thunderbirds was first broadcast in its home market in black and white.

Despite Grade's decision to double the running time, Thunderbirds was also sold in a two-part, 25-minute episode format. Each "concluding" part began with a narration by Shane Rimmer summarising the first part's action. Granada first transmitted the series in this format, airing both parts the same night (one before and one after the ITN Evening News). It switched to the original format when it began repeats in 1966. In 1968, it briefly transmitted episodes in three parts due to timeslot restrictions. In the Midlands, ATV broadcast Series One in the original format, then Series Two and Series One repeats as two-parters (with parts airing on consecutive evenings).

Repeats scheduling varied by region. ATV Midlands hosted regular repeats into the early 1970s. Thunderbirds was last transmitted on the ITV network in 1981.

From 1965 to 1967, APF released 19 Thunderbirds audio plays on EP record. Three of these were original stories; the rest were condensed TV episode re-tellings narrated by the regular characters. In 1990, eight of the plays were turned into radio dramas and transmitted on BBC Radio 5. The radio series was a success and led the BBC to secure the rights to the TV episodes, which it broadcast nationwide on BBC2 from September 1991. After this first run, which averaged more than six million viewers per episode, the BBC repeated the series six times: from 1992 to 1993 (Series One only), 1994 to 1995 (nine episodes only), 2000 to 2001 (in remastered form), and in 2003, 2005 and 2006. In Scotland, the BBC aired a Gaelic dub, Tairnearan Tar As ("Thunderbirds Are Go") in 1993 and 1994. Other channels which have shown the series include UK Gold (from 1994 to 1995), Bravo (1996–1997), Cartoon Network (2001–2002), Boomerang (2001–2003), Syfy (2009) and Talking Pictures TV (2023).

During the 1960s, Thunderbirds was exported to around 30 countries including the US, the Netherlands, Canada, Australia and Japan. International advance sales totalled £350,000 (about £6 million in 2025). It has since aired in at least 66 countries. In Japan, where it was first broadcast by NHK, Thunderbirds acquired a large fanbase and influenced the series Ultraseven, Mighty Jack, and Neon Genesis Evangelion. In the US, the 25-minute format aired in first-run syndication in 1968 to modest success. Internationally, the series has also been broadcast by TechTV, G4, Family Room HD and MeTV Toons (US), BBC Kids and YTV (Canada), Nine Network and Foxtel (Australia), TV3 (New Zealand), MediaCorp TV12 (Singapore) and RTÉ Two (Ireland).

== Reception ==
Thunderbirds is widely cited as the Andersons' most popular series and their greatest critical and commercial success. In 1966, the Royal Television Society awarded the series a Silver Medal for Outstanding Artistic Achievement. In 2000, the British Film Institute ranked it the seventh-best children's British TV programme. In 2007, it came 19th in a Radio Times poll for best science fiction programme of all time, and in 2013, it was ranked fourth in the Channel 5 list show 50 Greatest Kids' TV Shows. In 2015, it was ranked as viewers’ second-favourite ITV series in a Radio Times poll celebrating 60 years of ITV, narrowly losing to the comedy drama series Auf Wiedersehen, Pet. Acknowledging the series' "enduring appeal for both young and old", Robert Sellers remarks that "the cult of Thunderbirds has grown to near-mythic proportions." Kim Newman calls the series a "television perennial".

For John Peel, Thunderbirds is "without a doubt the peak of the Supermarionation achievement". Believing it to be pitched at a "more adult" level than its predecessors, he writes that its sense of adventure, humour and "gripping and convincing" episodes made sure that "everyone in the audience found something to love about it." Simon Heffer, a fan of Thunderbirds in childhood, has written positively of the series: "All the elements we children discerned in whatever grown-up television we had been allowed to watch were present in Thunderbirds: dramatic theme and incidental music; well-developed plots; goodies and baddies; swaggering Americans, at a time when the whole of Britain was in a cultural cringe to them; and, of course, glamorous locations [...] Then, of course, there was the nail-biting tension of the rescues themselves [...]"

In his foreword to John Marriott's book, Thunderbirds Are Go!, Gerry Anderson put forward several explanations for the series' lasting success: it "contains elements that appeal to most children – danger, jeopardy and destruction. But because International Rescue's mission is to save life, there is no gratuitous violence." According to Anderson, Thunderbirds incorporates a "strong family atmosphere, where Dad reigns supreme". Daniel O'Brien and script editor Alan Pattillo have commended the series' positive "family values". Heffer and others identify intergenerational appeal. In 1965, Stuart Hood praised Thunderbirds as a "modern fairy tale"; adding that it "can sometimes be frightening", he recommended that children and their parents watch it together. Writing for Dreamwatch magazine in 1994, Andrew Thomas described Thunderbirds as only "nominally" a children's programme: "Its themes are universal and speak as much to the adult in the child as the child in the adult." Shortly before the series' BBC revival in 2000, Brian Viner commented that Thunderbirds was on the point of "captivating yet another generation of viewers".

Jeff Evans argues that the 50-minute format allowed for stronger character development and "tension-building". O'Brien is less positive about the scripts, calling the plots frequently "formulaic" and sometimes "stretched to snapping point" by the extended running time. Cornell, Day and Topping are critical: they consider the writing to be "woefully poor" in places and Thunderbirds in general "often as clichéd as previous Anderson series". Peel, despite praising the storylines and characterisation, suggests that Thunderbirds contains less "tongue-in-cheek humour" than Stingray. He believes that Thunderbirds improves on its precursor by avoiding fantasy plot devices, comical and stereotyped villains, child characters and anthropomorphic animals, and what he calls the "standard Anderson sexism": whereas female characters were marginalised in earlier series, in Thunderbirds they play active and sometimes heroic roles.

During a 2001 exhibition dedicated to the series, Masaaki Hirakata, curator at the Tokyo Metropolitan Museum of Photography, described Thunderbirds as "a modern sci-fi expression of bunraku, which probably explains why it was accepted so readily [in Japan]".

=== Themes ===
Noting the technical detail of the launch sequences, Jonathan Bignell argues that the large amount of screen time given to the Thunderbird machines was partly motivated by the need to compensate for the puppets' limited mobility. The focus on futuristic craft has also been explored by Nicholas J. Cull, who writes that of all the Anderson series, Thunderbirds is the most evocative of a recurring theme: the "necessity of the human component of the machine", whereby the failures of new technology are overcome by "brave human beings and technology working together". This makes the series' vision of the 2060s "wonderfully humanistic and reassuring". O'Brien also praises the series' optimism, likening the Tracy family to guardian Übermensch. In 2009, Warren Ellis argued that Thunderbirds' technological predictions could inspire "a generation of mad and frightening engineers", adding that the series "trades in vast, demented concepts [...] immense and very beautiful ideas as solutions to problems."

Various commentators – including Bignell, Cull and O'Brien – have discussed Thunderbirds in relation to the Cold War. According to Bignell, The Hood's Eastern appearance and mysterious powers echoed James Bond villains and fears of China working as "a 'third force' antagonistic to the West". Cull states that despite the series' focus on the dangers of nuclear technology, the Thunderbird machines themselves contradict that theme: here, "an image of technology associated with the threat of Cold War mass destruction – the rocket emerging from the hidden silo – was appropriated and deployed to save life rather than to take it." He believes that the series adhered more closely to cultural norms when subscribing to the "Cold War cult of the secret agent whose skills defend the home from enemies unknown". He cites Lady Penelope's spy role and the episodes "30 Minutes After Noon" and "The Man from MI.5", which were heavily influenced by the James Bond novels and film adaptations.

=== Depiction of society ===
According to Andrew Thomas, the world of Thunderbirds resembles the 1960s in that contemporary capitalism and class structures appear to have endured. He observes, however, that wealth and high social status are often presented as character flaws rather than strengths. For Thomas, one of the reasons for the series' continuing popularity is the realism of International Rescue's machines. Newman, for his part, argues that "the point isn't realism. The 21st century of Thunderbirds is detailed [...] but also de-populated, a high-tech toyland". He is more critical in his comparisons of contemporary and future values, noting the "square, almost 50s" attitudes to race, sex and class. On stereotyping, Hood comments that he "would be happier if [villains] didn't seem to be recognisable by their pigmentation". In contrast, Cull regards Thunderbirds as progressive on the subject of race, arguing that it rejects negative stereotypes in its use of "positive non-white characters" like Tin-Tin and Kyrano. However, he considers many of the one-off villains to be clichéd, writing that they are typically presented as "corrupt businessmen, spivs and gangsters familiar from crime films".

In 2002, Thunderbirds' depiction of smoking was the subject of a study published by medical journal Tobacco Control. Despite identifying examples in 26 out of 32 episodes, Kate Hunt of the University of Glasgow concluded that Thunderbirds does not actively promote smoking – a view opposed by the Roy Castle Lung Cancer Foundation when the series was re-launched on BBC2 in the 2000s. Rejecting the Foundation's suggestion to digitally erase all cigars and cigarettes, the BBC stated that Thunderbirds "does not glorify or encourage smoking" and described the activity as "incidental to the plot".

== Merchandise ==
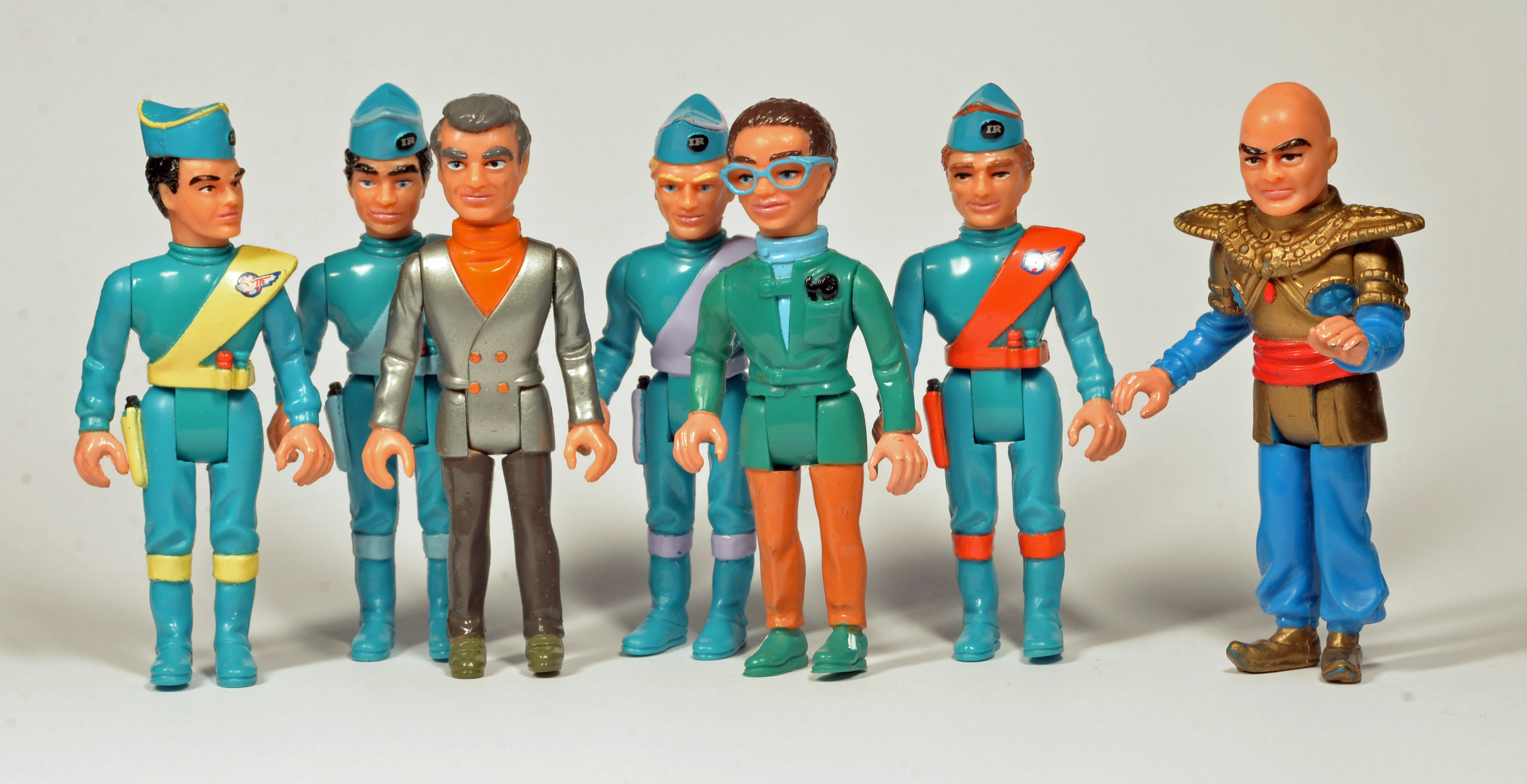
Action figures of (left to right): Virgil, Scott, Jeff and John Tracy; Brains; Gordon Tracy; and The Hood

A comic strip featuring Lady Penelope and Parker debuted in the early issues of the children's weekly TV Century 21 in 1965. The following year, a full-length Thunderbirds strip was introduced and the Lady Penelope adventures were given their own comic. The Thunderbirds strip in TV Century 21 (later TV21) ran from January 1966 to June 1970; it was originally written by Alan Fennell and drawn by Frank Bellamy, with subsequent contributors including Scott Goodall and John Cooper. It was reprinted in Countdown from 1971 to 1972.

More than 3,000 Thunderbirds products have been marketed since the series' TV debut. To accommodate the high demand for tie-ins, APF established three dedicated subsidiaries: APF Merchandising, APF Music and APF Toys. Due to the series' popularity, some UK commentators dubbed the 1966 end-of-year shopping season "Thunderbirds Christmas". In the early 1990s, Matchbox launched a new range of toys to coincide with the BBC2 repeats. Sales figures for Christmas 1992 surpassed those achieved by Star Wars merchandise in the 1970s and 1980s. Demand for Matchbox's Tracy Island Playset overwhelmed supply, resulting in a substantial black market for the toy.

The late 1960s saw the release of eight original Thunderbirds novels as well as Thunderbirds, Lady Penelope, and Captain Scarlet and Thunderbirds annuals. In 2008, FTL Publications of Minnesota launched a new series of novels.

The first Thunderbirds video game, developed by Firebird Software for the Commodore 64 and ZX Spectrum computers, was released in 1985. Since then, titles have been released for the Game Boy Color, Game Boy Advance and PlayStation 2. In the late 1980s, Thunderbirds was released on home video for the first time by PolyGram and its subsidiary Channel 5. Following its acquisition by Carlton in 1999, the series was digitally remastered for the release of the first DVD versions in 2000. Blu-ray editions followed in 2008.

An official Thunderbirds board game was published in 2015. It was designed by Matt Leacock, designer of Pandemic. In 2016, three expansion packs were released: Above & Beyond, The Hood, and Tracy Island.

== Later productions ==
The series has been followed by two film sequels, a live-action film adaptation, two TV remakes and several re-edited presentations for TV and home video. The second of the remakes, Thunderbirds Are Go, premiered on ITV in 2015, the 50th anniversary year of the original.

=== Film ===
The feature films Thunderbirds Are Go and Thunderbird 6 were released in 1966 and 1968. Lew Grade approved the production of the first film before the TV series began airing. Written and produced by the Andersons and directed by David Lane, the films were distributed by United Artists. Both were critical and commercial failures, and plans for further sequels were abandoned.

In the 1980s, ITC New York created compilation films from Thunderbirds and other APF series by re-editing selected episodes and combining them into feature-length presentations. Branded "Super Space Theater", this format was mainly intended for family viewing on US syndicated and cable TV. Three Thunderbirds features were produced: Thunderbirds to the Rescue, Thunderbirds in Outer Space and Countdown to Disaster.

Plans for a live-action film adaptation were first announced in 1993. These culminated in 2004's Thunderbirds, directed by Jonathan Frakes. The film was a critical and commercial failure and poorly received by fans of the TV series.

=== TV ===
In the 1970s, the Andersons sold their intellectual and profit participation rights to Thunderbirds and other productions. As a result, they had no creative control over later adaptations of their works. Thunderbirds was first remade for TV in the early 1980s as Thunderbirds 2086. In this anime re-imagining, set 20 years after the original, the vastly expanded International Rescue is based in an arcology and there are 17 Thunderbird machines. It was inspired by Thunderhawks, an updated story concept by Gerry Anderson and Reg Hill that later served as the basis for Anderson's Terrahawks.

Two re-edited series, based on condensed versions of 13 of the original episodes, aired in the US in 1994. The first, Thunderbirds USA, was broadcast as part of the Fox Kids programming block; the second, Turbocharged Thunderbirds, was syndicated by UPN. Devised as a comedy, Turbocharged Thunderbirds moved the action to the planet "Thunder-World" and combined the original puppet footage with live-action scenes featuring a pair of human teenagers.

Besides Thunderhawks, Anderson developed other ideas for a remake. A 1976 concept, Inter-Galactic Rescue 4, was to have featured a variable-configuration craft capable of performing rescues on land and sea, in air and in space; Anderson pitched the idea to NBC, who rejected it. In 1984 this was followed by T-Force, which Anderson was initially unable to pursue due to lack of funding. Development resumed in 1993, when it was decided to produce the series, now titled GFI, using cel animation. However, Anderson was disappointed with the results and cancelled the production.

In 2005, Anderson re-affirmed his wish to remake Thunderbirds but said that he had been unable to obtain the rights from Granada Ventures. Negotiations with Granada and its successor, ITV plc, continued for the next few years. In 2008, Anderson expressed his commitment to creating an "updated" version, ideally using CGI. Three years later, he announced that work on the new series had commenced. After Anderson's death in December 2012, the following year it was confirmed that ITV Studios and Pukeko Pictures had struck a deal to remake Thunderbirds using a combination of CGI and live-action model sets. The new series, Thunderbirds Are Go, premiered in 2015.

Later that year, to mark the series' 50th anniversary, ITV commissioned Pod 4 Films to produce a mini-series of new Thunderbirds episodes based on three of the 1960s audio plays. The mini-series was funded by a Kickstarter campaign and had its premiere screening at the BFI Southbank in 2016. Titled The Anniversary Episodes, it was released on BritBox in 2020 together with the original Thunderbirds.

=== Audio ===
In 2021, Big Finish Productions announced the launch of an audiobook series based on the APF productions. The first of these, Thunderbirds: Terror from the Stars – an adaptation of the tie-in novel Thunderbirds by John Theydon – was released in 2021. Produced by Anderson Entertainment, the audiobooks feature Jon Culshaw as the voices of Jeff Tracy and Parker, with Genevieve Gaunt as Lady Penelope.

== Influence ==
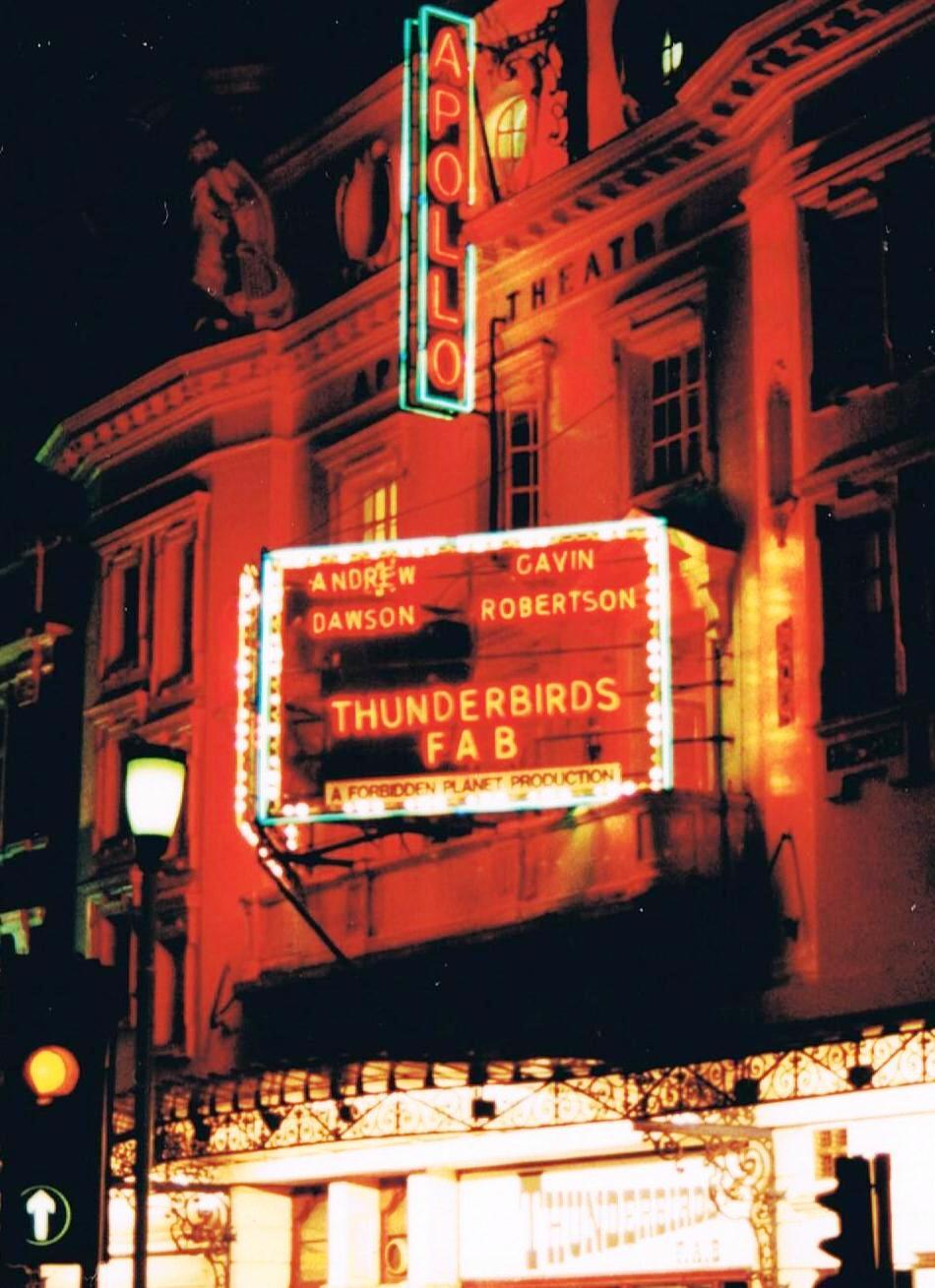
Billboard for the 1989 production of the tribute show Thunderbirds: F.A.B. at London's Apollo Theatre

Thunderbirds has influenced TV, cinema and other media. The BBC sketch comedy Not Only... But Also included a segment called "Superthunderstingcar" – a parody of Thunderbirds, Supercar and Stingray. The puppet comedy of Team America: World Police lampoons the idiosyncrasies of the Thunderbirds marionettes. The series inspired the dialogue animations in the 1997 video game Star Fox 64 and the elaborate Jaeger mecha launch sequences in the 2013 film Pacific Rim. Allusion and homage are also evident in the Wallace & Gromit film A Close Shave, Austin Powers: The Spy Who Shagged Me and Spaced, as well as in the character design of Kiss the Girls and Make them Die (1966) and Star Wars: The Clone Wars.

International Rescue inspired the International Rescue Corps, a volunteer search-and-rescue organisation started by a group of British firemen who contributed to the relief effort following the 1980 Irpinia earthquake. Virgin Group has used the series in the branding of its services: Virgin Atlantic flew a Boeing 747-400 called Lady Penelope, while Virgin Trains operated a fleet of Class 57 rescue locomotives named after the main characters and vehicles.

Cover versions of "The Thunderbirds March" have been released by musicians and bands including Billy Cotton, Joe Loss, Frank Sidebottom, The Rezillos and The Shadows. Songs inspired by the series include Busted's "Thunderbirds / 3AM" (which forms part of the soundtrack of the 2004 film), "International Rescue" by Fuzzbox, "Thunderbirds Are Coming Out" by TISM, and "Thunderbirds – Your Voice" by V6. The music video for the Dire Straits single "Calling Elvis", directed by Gerry Anderson, featured a collection of Thunderbirds-style puppets.

A mime theatre show, Thunderbirds: F.A.B., has toured internationally and popularised a staccato style of movement known as the "Thunderbirds walk". It has periodically been revived as Thunderbirds: F.A.B. – The Next Generation.

During the 1960s, APF produced Thunderbirds-themed TV adverts for Kellogg's breakfast cereal and Lyons Maid ice lollies. The Fab lolly, introduced in 1967, was launched to capitalise on the series' success and originally used FAB 1, Lady Penelope and Parker in its branding. In later decades, Thunderbirds has been used in advertising for Kit Kat, Swinton Insurance, Specsavers, Halifax and the Driver and Vehicle Licensing Agency.

The first annual "International Thunderbirds Day" was celebrated on 30 September 2017, the 52nd anniversary of the series' debut. To mark the event, Vue Cinemas hosted special Thunderbirds screenings in 52 locations around the UK. Additionally, the Emirates Air Line cable car featured "Thunderbirds Are Go" branding and the InterContinental London–The O2 Hotel offered a "Lady Penelope afternoon tea" in September and October.

== See also ==
- List of early colour TV shows in the UK
