= Security Hazard =

- Thunderbirds episode
- Episode no.: Series 1 Episode 26
- Directed by: Desmond Saunders
- Written by: Alan Pattillo
- Cinematography by: Julien Lugrin
- Editing by: Harry MacDonald
- Production code: 26
- Original air date: 31 March 1966

Guest character voices
- Sylvia Anderson as Chip Morrison; Ray Barrett as; Eddie Houseman and Lester; ("End of the Road" scenes): Colonel Harris; ("Sun Probe" scenes): Fireflash Co-Pilot; ("Trapped in the Sky" scenes): Controller and Assistant Controller; ("Day of Disaster" scenes): Peter Dyneley as Commander Norman; ("Trapped in the Sky"): David Graham as Mr Morrison and; Bob Gray; ("End of the Road"): Solarnaut Asher; ("Sun Probe"): Captain Hanson; ("Trapped in the Sky"): Dave Clayton and Frank; ("Day of Disaster"): John Tate as Solarnaut Camp; ("Sun Probe"): Matt Zimmerman as; TV news reporter ("Sun Probe"); Bill Craddock ("Day of Disaster")

Episode chronology
← Previous "The Cham-Cham"	Next → "Atlantic Inferno"

"Security Hazard" is the 26th episode of Thunderbirds, a British Supermarionation television series created by Gerry and Sylvia Anderson and filmed by their production company AP Films (APF) for ITC Entertainment. The final episode of Series One, it was written by Alan Pattillo, directed by Desmond Saunders, and first broadcast on 31 March 1966 on ATV Midlands. It had its first UK‑wide network transmission on 10 April 1992 on BBC2.

Set in the 2060s, Thunderbirds follows the missions of International Rescue, a secret organisation that uses technologically advanced rescue vehicles to save human life. The lead characters are ex‑astronaut Jeff Tracy, founder of International Rescue, and his five adult sons, who pilot the organisation's primary vehicles: the Thunderbird machines. In the clip show "Security Hazard", a young boy stows away on Thunderbird 2 during a rescue operation and the Tracys unwittingly fly him back to base. While the family work out how to get the boy home, International Rescue's secrecy is further jeopardised as the boy coaxes his hosts into describing past missions, which are recounted as flashbacks.

"Security Hazard" was devised as a clip show for reasons of economy: as "Attack of the Alligators!" and "The Cham-Cham" had gone over‑budget and over‑schedule, the writing team reworked the next episode to feature a large amount of recycled footage, thus limiting the need for new scenes and making up for the extra time and money spent on the previous two instalments. It was APF's second clip show, preceded by Stingray's "Aquanaut of the Year". APF's next two series, Captain Scarlet and the Mysterons and Joe 90, also ended with clip shows ("The Inquisition" and "The Birthday").

== Plot ==
As International Rescue fight a fire in an English mine, a nearby resident, Mr Morrison, puts his son Chip to bed before leaving their house to help fight the fire. Curious about International Rescue, Chip moves to his bedroom window and gazes out at the open pod door of Thunderbird 2, which is sitting unattended in a field.

After the fire is extinguished, Scott flies back to Tracy Island in Thunderbird 1, followed by Virgil and Alan in Thunderbird 2. When Jeff's control panel warns of a stowaway aboard Thunderbird 2, the Tracys rush to the hangar and confront the intruder: Chip, who stowed away.

Furious at this security breach, Jeff holds an urgent meeting with his sons to decide what to do about Chip, but no one knows how to get the boy home safely without him revealing International Rescue's secrets to the wider world. Chip is looked after by each of the brothers in turn, and he encourages them into recalling past rescue missions: Virgil explains Thunderbird 2's role in saving Eddie Houseman, who was trapped in a truck teetering on a cliff edge (as seen in "End of the Road"); Alan, pilot of Thunderbird 3, discusses the rescue of the Sun Probe astronauts ("Sun Probe"); Scott recounts International Rescue's very first operation – saving the Fireflash airliner from an auto‑detonating bomb ("Trapped in the Sky"); Gordon, pilot of Thunderbird 4, describes how he freed the technicians trapped inside the sunken Martian Space Probe ("Day of Disaster"); the brothers are surprised to discover Jeff himself giving Chip a full run-down of the importance of his own position in International Rescue.

Jeff finally hits on a solution. Chip, who has been awake for hours, is left to fall asleep and then quietly flown home in Thunderbird 2. At dawn, Mr Morrison returns home to find Chip still in bed and no sign of International Rescue. On waking, Chip has clear memories of his time on Tracy Island, but his amused father convinces him that it was all a dream.

== Regular voice cast ==
- Sylvia Anderson as Lady Penelope ("Day of Disaster" scenes)
- Peter Dyneley as Jeff Tracy
- Christine Finn as Tin-Tin Kyrano ("Sun Probe" scenes)
- David Graham as Gordon Tracy and Brains
- David Holliday as Virgil Tracy
- Shane Rimmer as Scott Tracy
- Matt Zimmerman as Alan Tracy

== Production ==
The 50-minute episode contains only 17 minutes of original footage (the frame story about Chip). Its other two‑thirds are made up of flashbacks to the episodes "End of the Road", "Sun Probe", "Trapped in the Sky" and "Day of Disaster". "Security Hazard" was devised as a clip show after the production of "Attack of the Alligators!" and "The Cham-Cham" finished behind schedule and over budget, forcing the series scriptwriters to come up with a way to make the next episode quickly and cheaply with only a limited number of new scenes. To simplify the production, the flashbacks were taken from early episodes that had first been filmed in Thunderbirds' original 25-minute format (before ITC's Lew Grade ordered the running time doubled), as these episodes were easier to truncate.

The frame story reused several puppets and scale models from earlier episodes. The puppet playing Chip previously appeared in "Cry Wolf" as Bob Williams, while Chip's father is also seen in the flashback to "Day of Disaster" as one of that episode's guest characters. The International Rescue fire truck was modified from the explosives truck seen in "End of the Road", while the Morrison house previously appeared as Grandma Tracy's cottage in "Move – and You're Dead" and the Williams residence in "Cry Wolf".

== Reception ==
In her 1991 autobiography, Sylvia Anderson called the episode "lightweight but charming" and "refreshingly" different from most Thunderbirds episodes. She also wrote that doing the voice of Chip reminded her of her work on Supercar (in which she voiced the boy Jonathan Zero and other characters).

Rating "Security Hazard" one out of five, Tom Fox of Starburst magazine writes that the flashback format makes for a "boring" episode. However, he adds that the story is somewhat redeemed by Chip's mischief in getting the Tracys to divulge sensitive information, as well as by the way in which the family gets rid of him. Marcus Hearn points out that Jeff's coldness towards Chip is in stark contrast to his friendly welcome of young brothers Bob and Tony Williams in "Cry Wolf", and Nicky in "Give or Take a Million"; however, Hearn adds that this produces "intriguing tension" between Jeff and his sons. Hearn also notes that Chip is one of a "curiously large" number of Supermarionation child characters who appear to have been raised by single fathers, and lack mother figures in their lives.

Michael Coldwell calls the episode "highly entertaining" and likens it to a "greatest hits" with all the Thunderbird machines. He praises how Chip's behaviour turns the Tracys into figures of fun and expresses regret that his visit to Tracy Island was not made a full-length episode, as opposed to a framing device for a series of flashbacks. "Security Hazard" has also been praised by screenwriter Peter Briggs, who calls it one of his favourite Thunderbirds episodes. Briggs disagrees with the notion that the episode is weakened by being a clip show, stating that he actually likes it all the more for that reason. He believes that along with "Cry Wolf" and "Give or Take a Million", "Security Hazard" incorporates a theme of child wish fulfilment.
