= Atlantic Inferno =

- Thunderbirds episode
- Thunderbird 2 (left) deploys Thunderbird 4 as the undersea fire threatens Seascape (right). The episode has been praised for its special effects. The Seascape model that appears in the episode was a replacement for the original, which was accidentally destroyed off-camera.
- Episode no.: Series 2 Episode 1
- Directed by: Desmond Saunders
- Written by: Alan Fennell
- Cinematography by: Julien Lugrin
- Editing by: Harry Macdonald
- Production code: 27
- Original air date: 2 October 1966

Guest character voices
- Ray Barrett as the submarine captain and a TV newsreader; Peter Dyneley as the World Navy commander; David Graham as the captain of the Atlantic; John Tate (uncredited) as Frank Hooper and Sir Harry; Jeremy Wilkin as Dick O'Shea and Cravitz; Matt Zimmerman as the submarine lieutenant

Episode chronology
← Previous "Security Hazard"	Next → "Path of Destruction"

"Atlantic Inferno" is the 27th episode of Thunderbirds, a British Supermarionation television series created by Gerry and Sylvia Anderson and filmed by their production company AP Films (APF; later Century 21 Productions) for ITC Entertainment. Written by Alan Fennell and directed by Desmond Saunders, it was first broadcast on 2 October 1966 on ATV London and Anglia Television as the first episode of Series Two. It had its first UK-wide network broadcast on 17 April 1992 on BBC2.

Set in the 2060s, Thunderbirds follows the missions of International Rescue, a secret organisation that uses technologically advanced rescue vehicles to save human life. The lead characters are ex-astronaut Jeff Tracy, founder of International Rescue, and his five adult sons, who pilot the organisation's primary vehicles: the Thunderbird machines. In "Atlantic Inferno", a navy weapons test in the Atlantic Ocean ignites a gas field under the seabed, threatening a drilling platform. With Jeff on holiday in Australia, his replacement, Scott, struggles to coordinate International Rescue's response to the crisis.

In 1967, Century 21 released an audio adaptation on vinyl EP record (catalogue number MA 125), narrated by David Graham as Gordon Tracy. ITC New York later paired the episode with "Terror in New York City" to create the Thunderbirds compilation film Countdown To Disaster (1982). In 1992, a novelisation by Dave Morris was published by Young Corgi. The same year, a three-part comic strip adaptation was printed in Fleetway's Thunderbirds: The Comic.

== Plot ==
While holidaying on her farm in Australia, Lady Penelope contacts Jeff on Tracy Island and suggests that he join her for a much-needed break. Persuaded by his sons, Jeff leaves Scott in charge of International Rescue and flies to Australia in a light aircraft. Alan becomes temporary pilot of Thunderbird 1.

In the Atlantic Ocean, the World Navy is testing nuclear torpedoes not far from the Seascape drilling platform. One of the torpedoes goes out of control and explodes on the seabed, igniting a gas field and sending up a two-hundred-foot-tall (61 m) fire jet. John Tracy relays the news from Thunderbird 5 to Tracy Island, where Brains predicts that a larger explosion could cause a tsunami.

Concerned about the risk to Seascape, Scott launches an operation to put out the fire and dispatches Alan, Virgil and Gordon to the scene in Thunderbird 1 and Thunderbird 2. Gordon launches Thunderbird 4 from Thunderbird 2's pod and clamps a sealing device over the base of the fire jet, extinguishing it. Jeff, who has been following TV newscasts on the crisis in the Atlantic, contacts Scott and reprimands him for getting International Rescue involved when there was no immediate threat to human life.

A second fire jet erupts several miles from the first. Deducing that the fire is travelling under the seabed and puncturing its weakest points, Brains warns that the next target could be Seascape itself. The navy prepares to evacuate the rig as a precaution, but Scott, discouraged by Jeff's admonishment, sees no need for any further action by International Rescue, reasoning that the fire will eventually burn itself out.

Another undersea explosion dislodges one of Seascape's columns. As controller Frank Hooper and his assistant O'Shea are lowered into the water in a diving capsule to assess the damage, further explosions destroy the capsule's winch mechanism, plunging Hooper and O'Shea to the seabed under heavy debris. Brains predicts that the fire will rise up Seascape's borehole and consume the rig. Forced to act, Scott sends his brothers back out to rescue Hooper and O'Shea while navy helijets airlift the rest of the crew to safety. Realising that his place is on Tracy Island, Jeff cuts short his holiday and starts back home.

Alan lands on Seascape to coordinate the airlift while Virgil redeploys Gordon in Thunderbird 4. Evacuation complete, Alan takes off again moments before the rig disintegrates and Thunderbird 1 falls into the sea. Down below, Gordon cuts through the capsule's cables, then lifts it clear of the debris and up to the surface. Using Thunderbird 2's grabs, Virgil transfers the capsule to a waiting navy ship. By the time Jeff arrives home, proud of his sons' performance, Scott needs a holiday himself and has no hesitation in handing control back to his father.

== Regular voice cast ==
- Sylvia Anderson as Lady Penelope
- Ray Barrett as John Tracy
- Peter Dyneley as Jeff Tracy
- Christine Finn as Tin-Tin Kyrano
- David Graham as Gordon Tracy, Brains and Parker
- Shane Rimmer as Scott Tracy
- Jeremy Wilkin as Virgil Tracy
- Matt Zimmerman as Alan Tracy

== Production ==
"Atlantic Inferno" was the first episode of Thunderbirds' second filming block, which partly overlapped with the production of the feature film Thunderbirds Are Go. The six episodes of this block are regarded as the second season, or Series Two, of Thunderbirds.

In the opening scene, set in Australia, Lady Penelope detonates an explosive charge in a rock formation to clear a path for a giant road-laying vehicle. This scale model was a repainted version of the road construction vehicle from "End of the Road".

During the filming of Seascape's destruction, a mishap involving a broken camera and a misheard cue ended in the full disintegration of the model while the camera was off. The crew were forced to rebuild the model and remount the shot.

"Atlantic Inferno" is the only episode in which a Tracy other than Scott pilots Thunderbird 1.

== Reception ==
Tom Fox of Starburst magazine rates the episode three out of five, describing it as a "tidy little adventure". Stephen La Rivière praises the episode's "giant fire jet" special effects and calls it an "excellent start" to Series Two. Ranking it among the best episodes, Matthew Dennis of Cultbox describes "Atlantic Inferno" as an "effects triumph". He also praises its "character building" of Jeff and Scott, believing such development to be unusual for the series. Mark Braxton describes the conflict between father and son as "compelling" and considers the episode's underwater action a "pleasing throwback" to Thunderbirds' precursor, Stingray. He also applauds the episode for presenting a scenario in which International Rescue's initial efforts ironically make a disaster situation worse.

For Marcus Hearn, the crisis in the Atlantic provides a "backdrop for a revealing study of Jeff's personality" as well as his relationship with his sons. He adds that this characterisation demonstrates the series' "growing maturity" in its last few episodes. Hearn also praises the technical skill of the model work, noting the combination of fire and water (elements which are hard to control and cannot be miniaturised) and use of low camera angles to make the Seascape model look more imposing and realistic.

According to Nicholas J. Cull, "Atlantic Inferno" is one of many Anderson productions that show technological progress in a negative light, here combined with mockery of military ways: the plot about the errant nuclear torpedoes "[mixes] implied criticism of an 'innovation too far' in military technology with an unflattering portrait of the overly stiff and inflexible military mind." He also states that "Atlantic Inferno" and other episodes show how "nuclear weapons and wider nuclear fears in general are much part of the world of Gerry Anderson."
