= Move – and You're Dead =

- Thunderbirds episode
- Episode no.: Series 1 Episode 9
- Directed by: Alan Pattillo
- Written by: Alan Pattillo
- Cinematography by: Paddy Seale
- Editing by: Harry MacDonald
- Production code: 9
- Original air date: 10 February 1966

Guest character voices
- Sylvia Anderson as Car Park Announcer; Ray Barrett as Johnny Gillespie, Kenny Malone & Race Announcer; David Graham as Victor Gomez; David Holliday as Race Timekeeper; Matt Zimmerman as Billy Billoxi

Episode chronology
← Previous "Operation Crash-Dive"	Next → "Martian Invasion"

"Move – and You're Dead" is an episode of Thunderbirds, a British Supermarionation television series created by Gerry and Sylvia Anderson and filmed by their production company AP Films (APF, later Century 21 Productions) for ITC Entertainment. Written and directed by Alan Pattillo, it was first broadcast on 10 February 1966 on ATV Midlands as the 20th episode of Series One. It is the ninth episode in the official running order.

Set in the 2060s, Thunderbirds follows the missions of International Rescue, a secret organisation which uses technologically advanced rescue vehicles to save human life. The main characters are ex‑astronaut Jeff Tracy, founder of International Rescue, and his five adult sons, who pilot the organisation's primary vehicles: the Thunderbird machines. In "Move – and You're Dead", motor racing champion Alan Tracy and his grandmother are threatened by an envious rival driver and his pit man, who trap them on a deserted bridge next to a movement-activated bomb. As Scott, Virgil and Brains rush to save them, Alan and Grandma must keep still to stay alive.

In 1967, Century 21 released an audio adaptation on EP record (One Move and You're Dead, catalogue number MA 128) narrated by voice actress Christine Finn as series regular Tin-Tin Kyrano. The episode had its first UK-wide network broadcast on 28 February 1992 on BBC2.

== Plot ==
On a deserted suspension bridge above the San Miguel River, somewhere in the Western United States. (Note: John Marriott et al. place the San Miguel bridge in California. According to Chris Bentley, Grandma's house is near the West Coast of the United States.) Alan and Grandma Tracy are trapped on one of the towers in the sweltering midday sun. Next to them is a device generating ultrasonic waves. Despite the heat, Alan and Grandma must remain still, for if they disturb the waves, the generator will detonate a bomb planted under the tower. Worse yet, even if they avoid causing their own deaths, the bomb is timed to go off at 1.00 p.m. regardless. Alan slowly uses his wristwatch videophone to alert Tracy Island. As Scott and Virgil, joined by Brains, set off in Thunderbirds 1 and 2, Jeff helps Alan focus by ordering him to explain how he and Grandma ended up trapped on the bridge.

Alan's story begins with his return to motor racing at the Parola Sands Grand Prix, where he is competing in a BR2 car whose engine has been specially upgraded by Brains. Despite foul play from rival driver Victor Gomez, who tries to push him off the track, Alan pulls ahead in the final seconds and wins the race. Embittered by this defeat, Gomez and his pit man, Johnny Gillespie, set out to eliminate Alan and steal his car. They make their first attempt on Alan's life at an automated car park while he is videophoning Grandma, who is leaving the US with Alan to take up residence on Tracy Island. Gomez and Gillespie force a car off its parking stack, crushing the videophone booth, but Alan has already left.

Driving the BR2, Alan collects Grandma from her cottage and the pair leave to rendezvous with Thunderbird 2. They are halted by Gomez and Gillespie, who divert them to the bridge, force them onto the tower at gunpoint, then seize the BR2 and drive away.

Landing Thunderbird 2, Virgil and Brains activate pod vehicles: Brains the Neutraliser Tractor, Virgil the Jet-Air Transporter. Brains uses the tractor's electromagnetic pulse to disable the ultrasonic generator, then Virgil drives the transporter onto the bridge. Alan falls from the girder but is caught by the transporter's air cushion, which gently lowers him to the ground; Grandma jumps and also lands safely in the cushion of air. The Tracys clear the bridge just before the bomb explodes. Meanwhile, Scott chases Gomez and Gillespie in Thunderbird 1. The criminals lose control of the BR2 and are killed when they plunge off a cliff, crashing into the canyon below.

Back on Tracy Island, Alan keeps still while Virgil paints his portrait, observed by Scott. Unknown to Alan, the painting is not true to life, but an imaginative avant-garde piece. When the joke is revealed, Alan gets his own back on Virgil and Scott by sending the platform they are standing on down to the Thunderbird 3 launch bay.

== Regular voice cast ==
- Peter Dyneley as Jeff Tracy
- Christine Finn as Tin-Tin Kyrano and Grandma Tracy
- David Graham as Brains
- David Holliday as Virgil Tracy
- Shane Rimmer as Scott Tracy
- Matt Zimmerman as Alan Tracy

== Production ==
The ninth episode in the production and ITC-recommended viewing orders, "Move – and You're Dead" is one of several early episodes that were extended from 25 to 50 minutes after Lew Grade – owner of APF, who had been impressed by the 25-minute version of the first episode, "Trapped in the Sky" – ordered the runtime doubled so the series would fill an hour-long timeslot. "Move – and You're Dead" was originally filmed in December 1964 and extended in October 1965. Alan's flashbacks, leading up to his and Grandma's stranding on the bridge, account for roughly half of the 50-minute length. Most of the extending material served to expand the flashbacks: in the original 25-minute episode, Alan's story began with his arrival at Grandma's cottage, omitting the Parola Sands race and events immediately before and after. Scenes filmed specifically for the final 50-minute version included Virgil flying Alan out to the US in Thunderbird 2, Alan meeting Gomez and Gillespie before the race, the actual race sequence, and Gomez and Gillespie's attempted murder of Alan at the automated car park. The closing scene of Virgil's practical joke was another later addition.

In "Move – and You're Dead", Grandma Tracy is in the process of moving to Tracy Island. Therefore, this episode is set before all other episodes featuring the character, in which she has already left the US. Although Grandma was originally absent from earlier episodes, she is seen or mentioned in the additional scenes filmed for "Sun Probe", "The Uninvited", "The Mighty Atom", "Vault of Death" and "Operation Crash-Dive" (production numbers 4 to 8) to extend those episodes from 25 to 50 minutes. These scenes show her living on the island, creating a continuity error if the episodes are watched in sequence. Marcus Hearn comments that such discrepancies "possibly [indicate that] the series was never intended to be shown in its production order." He adds that the error was "compounded" by the ATV Midlands schedule: Grandma's first broadcast appearance came with ATV's premiere of "The Uninvited" in December 1965, preceding "Move – and You're Dead" by more than two months.

In an interview, Alan Tracy voice actor Matt Zimmerman named this episode as one that he especially enjoyed working on: "I [...] loved doing 'Move – and You're Dead', stuck up on that bridge with Grandma, talking into my watch." The puppet set representing the BR2 cockpit was a re-dress of the interior of a convertible driven by Scott Tracy in "City of Fire".

== Reception ==
Sylvia Anderson called the episode an "exciting and unusual action adventure", judging it atypical for its use of flashbacks and the character Grandma. Marcus Hearn praises Pattillo's "cleverly-structured screenplay", describing the bomb threat as "an intriguing predicament". For Chris Bentley, the "unusual" flashback-dependent structure helps to make the episode a "mould-breaking instalment".

Rating "Move – and You're Dead" 4 out of 5, Tom Fox of Starburst magazine comments that the episode has "a certain amount of drama" in its presentation. He calls the flashbacks "engaging for the most part" and praises the balance of action and exposition. He also considers the motor race particularly entertaining and describes the rescue of Alan and Grandma as "ingenious", but characterises the car park scene as an "odd moment", remarking that the murder attempt by way of a falling car "feels a bit like a Roadrunner cartoon".

== Footnotes ==
=== Works cited ===
- Bentley, Chris (2005) [2000]. The Complete Book of Thunderbirds (2nd ed.). London, UK: Carlton Books. ISBN 978-1-84442-454-2.
- Hearn, Marcus (2015). Thunderbirds: The Vault. London, UK: Virgin Books. ISBN 978-0-753-55635-1.
