= Ricochet (Thunderbirds) =

- Thunderbirds episode
- Episode no.: Series 2 Episode 5
- Directed by: Brian Burgess
- Written by: Tony Barwick
- Cinematography by: Paddy Seale
- Editing by: Harry Ledger
- Production code: 31
- Original air date: 6 November 1966

Guest character voices
- Sylvia Anderson as Professor Marshall; Ray Barrett as Rick O'Shea; David Graham as Loman and the Sentinel Base computer; Charles Tingwell (uncredited) as the ISC Controller; Jeremy Wilkin as Power and DJ Tom

Episode chronology
← Previous "Lord Parker's 'Oliday"	Next → "Give or Take a Million"

"Ricochet" is the 31st episode of Thunderbirds, a British Supermarionation television series created by Gerry and Sylvia Anderson and filmed by their production company AP Films (APF; later Century 21 Productions) for ITC Entertainment. Written by Tony Barwick and directed by Brian Burgess, it was first broadcast on 6 November 1966 on ATV London and Anglia Television as the fifth episode of Series Two. It had its first UK-wide network transmission on 15 May 1992 on BBC2.

Set in the 2060s, the series follows the missions of International Rescue, a secret organisation which uses technologically advanced rescue vehicles to save human life. The lead characters are ex-astronaut Jeff Tracy, the founder of International Rescue, and his five adult sons, who pilot the organisation's main fleet – the Thunderbird machines. In "Ricochet", the Tracy brothers rush to save an astronaut DJ and his technician after the destruction of a malfunctioning rocket damages their pirate radio satellite and causes it to begin to fall out of orbit.

In 1967, Century 21 released a 21-minute audio adaptation on vinyl EP record (catalogue number MA 126), narrated by voice actor David Graham as the character Brains.

== Plot ==
Following a second stage separation failure, Sentinel Base destructs its newly launched Telsat 4 rocket at orbital coordinates designated safe by International Space Control (ISC). Unknown to the authorities, the rocket is in the vicinity of KLA, an unregistered pirate radio satellite operated by DJ Rick O'Shea and his technician Loman. The detonation of Telsat 4 cripples KLA, which begins to fall out of orbit.

Discovering that the brake parachutes are inoperable, Loman conducts a spacewalk to assess the damage but ends up trapped outside the satellite after the inner airlock door fails to open. O'Shea is unable to repair the fault from inside, and with Loman's oxygen running out, goes back on the air to broadcast a distress call. International Rescue space station Thunderbird 5 fails to pick up the transmission, as it has been taken offline while astronaut John Tracy and his brother Gordon install a new component. However, Tin-Tin Kyrano is tuned in from her bedroom on Tracy Island and alerts the rest of International Rescue.

Jeff Tracy dispatches Alan and Scott in Thunderbird 3 to rescue O'Shea and Loman, with Virgil and Brains providing aerial support in Thunderbird 2 as KLA re-enters the atmosphere. Alan and Scott pull alongside KLA and Alan spacewalks over to extract the unconscious Loman from the airlock. With Loman safely aboard Thunderbird 3, Alan goes back with a plasma torch to cut through the door and rescue O'Shea.

As KLA starts to break up, ISC informs Virgil and Brains that the satellite's descent puts it on a collision course with the Middle Eastern oil refinery A'Ben Duh. To avert disaster on the ground, Virgil and Brains realise that they must shoot down KLA while it is still in the air. They prepare to fire Thunderbird 2's missile gun but suddenly hear O'Shea's voice on the radio and infer that he is still aboard the satellite. With Thunderbird 5 non-operational, Virgil and Brains are unable to radio base to confirm that O'Shea is safe. Reluctant to shoot down O'Shea but aware that the destruction of the refinery would cause much loss of life, Virgil and Brains move beneath KLA and initiate a roll, catching the satellite on Thunderbird 2's wing in an effort to change its trajectory. They have trouble shaking off the satellite and almost hit the refinery themselves, but KLA finally breaks away from Thunderbird 2 and crashes in the desert.

Virgil and Brains return home dejectedly thinking they have killed O'Shea, but are delighted when Jeff and Alan reveal that the DJ is very much alive; after Alan cut his way into the satellite, O'Shea, who suffers from vertigo, was terrified of the space walk. Panicking, O'Shea inadvertently pushed a switch that played a pre-recorded transmission – the one heard aboard Thunderbird 2. In the end, he had to be rescued against his will. When O'Shea appears on TV sporting a black eye, Alan admits that he was forced to punch the DJ in the face to gain his cooperation.

== Regular voice cast ==
- Peter Dyneley as Jeff Tracy
- Christine Finn as Tin-Tin Kyrano and Grandma Tracy
- David Graham as Brains and John Tracy
- Shane Rimmer as Scott Tracy
- Jeremy Wilkin as Virgil Tracy
- Matt Zimmerman as Alan Tracy

== Production ==
KLA was inspired by offshore radio station Radio Caroline, which since its founding in 1964 had been circumventing the BBC's legal monopoly on radio broadcasting by transmitting from ships in international waters. Gerry Anderson said that as the mid-1960s were "also the early days of space travel", it was "inevitable that [APF] would eventually come up with the idea for a show that would feature a pirate radio station in space." The Telsat 4 rocket was named after the Telstar communications satellites.

The episode's title is introduced with a "ricocheting" stock sound effect obtained from APF's tape library. Within the episode, Rick O'Shea plays this effect every time he mentions his name while on the air. The name Rick O'Shea was derived from "ricochet" because Gerry Anderson liked the sound effect and found the homophone amusing. As with Scott Tracy, the face of the O'Shea puppet was modelled on that of Sean Connery.

Thunderbird 3's undocking from Thunderbird 5 at the start of the episode is the only scene in the series to show Thunderbird 3 being piloted by Virgil Tracy, who usually flies Thunderbird 2. A production error in the same sequence has John Tracy (whose regular voice actor was Ray Barrett) speaking with the voice of Gordon (supplied by David Graham). The scale model of the ISC building previously appeared as a satellite tracking station in "The Impostors" and "Cry Wolf". The model representing KLA was first seen as a satellite in the latter episode.

Tunes played by KLA include the theme from the Thunderbirds Series One episode "The Man from MI.5" and an instrumental version of "I've Got Something to Shout About" from the Stingray episode "Titan Goes Pop". The closing scene is accompanied by the song "Flying High"; performed by Gary Miller with a group of backing vocalists that included Ken Barrie, this was intended to be the series' ending theme until it was replaced with "The Thunderbirds March" two weeks before the premiere of the first episode.

== Reception ==
Sylvia Anderson considered the focus on a pirate radio satellite unusual for the series but wrote that it allowed the episode to exploit the nascent "space-age era".

Simon Archer and Marcus Hearn call the episode a "classic". Commenting that it boasts "some of the funniest dialogue in the series", Hearn argues that through KLA and the character of O'Shea – described by Hearn as a "proto-'video jockey'" – "Ricochet" predicted the emergence of MTV and the 21st century's "superfluity of satellite channels with minuscule audiences". Ian Fryer, who makes a similar connection to MTV, views "Ricochet" as arguably the series' "most direct reference" to real-world events, describing the episode as "[updating] the British craze for pirate radio stations in the mid-to-late 1960s to the space age." He adds that a scene in which Jeff Tracy voices his disapproval of KLA as an unlicensed broadcaster echoes contemporary objections to offshore radio vessels on the grounds that they posed a hazard to shipping and interfered with emergency service communications.

For Michael Coldwell, "Ricochet" is a "glorious reprise of Thunderbirds' trademark 'vehicular meltdown' plot". He highlights the episode's "sophisticated" visuals, noting the "moody" lighting and angular sets of the Sentinel Base scenes (which he believes may have been inspired by the production design of Dr. Strangelove and the James Bond films) as well as the "NASA-style" Telsat 4 rocket. Coldwell also praises the script for leaving O'Shea's fate ambiguous until the closing scene, and thus maintaining the suspense: "By keeping us in the dark on this score until the very end of the episode, Barwick ensures we remain exactly where he wants us – on the edge of our seats." He observes that "Ricochet" was the last episode of Thunderbirds to show International Rescue in "full-blown action mode", preceding the Christmas-themed series finale "Give or Take a Million".

Tom Fox of Starburst magazine rates the episode 2 out of 5, citing its "totally unbelievable" final rescue and "silly Sixties music". However, he praises the action sequences and characterisation, noting Alan's resentment of his girlfriend Tin-Tin's admiration for O'Shea and his music.
