= Pit of Peril =

- Thunderbirds episode
- Sidewinder is overflown by a US Army helicopter. The walker has been described as a "great but hilariously awkward invention" by one commentator. The arms of the filming model were made from chains of cake tins.
- Episode no.: Series 1 Episode 2
- Directed by: Desmond Saunders
- Written by: Alan Fennell
- Cinematography by: Julien Lugrin
- Editing by: Harry MacDonald
- Production code: 2
- Original air date: 7 October 1965

Guest character voices
- Ray Barrett as Colonel Sweeney & Lieutenant Mead; Peter Dyneley as Ralph; David Graham as General Peters, Sergeant Reynolds & Frank; Shane Rimmer as Johnny; Matt Zimmerman as Captain & Helijet Pilot (Charlie)

Episode chronology
← Previous "Trapped in the Sky"	Next → "City of Fire"

"Pit of Peril" is the second episode of Thunderbirds, a British Supermarionation television series created by Gerry and Sylvia Anderson and filmed by their production company AP Films (APF) for ITC Entertainment. Written by Alan Fennell and directed by Desmond Saunders, it was first broadcast on 7 October 1965 on ATV Midlands.

Set in the 2060s, the series follows the missions of International Rescue, a secret organisation that uses technologically advanced rescue vehicles to save human life. The main characters are ex-astronaut Jeff Tracy, founder of International Rescue, and his five adult sons, who pilot the organisation's primary vehicles – the Thunderbird machines. In "Pit of Peril", International Rescue rush to save the crew of the Sidewinder, an experimental army walker that has fallen into an abandoned military waste dump.

Prior to the episode's first broadcast, the Sidewinder had already appeared in TV Century 21 as part of the comic's regular Stingray strip. "Pit of Peril" is praised for its music and model-work though its pacing received mixed reviews, with some reviwers comparing it as too similar to the previous episode, "Trapped in the Sky". In 1991, the episode was adapted into a two-part strip for Fleetway Publications' Thunderbirds: The Comic.

== Plot ==
In the African jungle, the United States Army is testing a new all-terrain Sidewinder, a giant four-legged walker developed for use in brushfire wars. Disaster strikes when the ground gives way beneath the Sidewinder and it falls into a blazing pit, with its crew of three – Colonel Sweeney, Frank and Johnny – trapped inside, hundreds of feet below ground. Their air and other life support systems are failing and the outside temperature is rising rapidly.

An air support unit, comprising a helicopter crew and the Sidewinder relief crew, evaluate the situation. The leader, General Peters, states that the Sidewinder weighs over 500 tons and the equipment needed to lift it would take weeks to arrive. Lieutenant Mead volunteers to be hoisted into the pit to assess the Sidewinder's condition but can only glimpse the vehicle before he is overwhelmed by the heat and forced to withdraw. A plan is devised to set the Sidewinder upright using the helicopter, so that the machine may be able to climb to the surface, and Sergeant Reynolds goes in to attach a line to one of the legs. He succeeds but also emerges from the pit badly burnt. Mead and Reynolds are airlifted to hospital in the relief crew's helijet. The Sidewinder proves too heavy for the helicopter and the line slips off during the rescue attempt.

Prompted by his aide, Ralph, Peters sends out an emergency call to International Rescue. The transmissions have already been picked up by John Tracy on the Thunderbird 5 space station and relayed to Tracy Island. After confirmation from John that the army needs their help, Jeff immediately dispatches Scott in Thunderbird 1, followed by Virgil and Brains in Thunderbird 2 carrying the Mole and two Recovery Vehicles. Reaching the scene, the team survey the pit using Thunderbird 1's remote camera, which sights old army wreckage. They determine that the pit was once an open-cast mine which had been used as a military equipment dump after World War II; a crust of earth has formed over the top and spontaneous combustion has caused the wreckage in the pit to burn up. Brains deduces that they must remove the remainder of the crust before the Recovery Vehicles will be able to drag the Sidewinder up the side of the pit.

Wearing a protective suit, Virgil enters the pit to lay explosive charges around the perimeter. Scott uses the Mole to drill through the side of the crater to recover Virgil. Brains detonates the charges and the explosions successfully clear the crust over the pit. Virgil takes control of two Recovery Vehicles equipped with magnetic lines attached to winch cables. The electromagnets are fired at the Sidewinder and the recovery vehicles begin to haul it up the side of the pit. One of the electromagnets fails and becomes detached from the Sidewinder, so Virgil has to winch it in and fire again. This time, the magnet holds firm and on the second attempt, the Recovery Vehicles finally manage to pull the Sidewinder up to the surface.

Sweeney, Frank and Johnny are airlifted to hospital in a medical helicopter, and International Rescue depart. A grateful Peters, agreeing to Scott's guarantee of secrecy for the organisation, voices his wish that the Tracys were in his army.

== Regular voice cast ==
- Ray Barrett as John Tracy
- Peter Dyneley as Jeff Tracy
- David Graham as Brains
- David Holliday as Virgil Tracy
- Shane Rimmer as Scott Tracy

== Production ==
"Pit of Peril" is one of several early Thunderbirds episodes that were originally 25 minutes long but subsequently extended to 50 minutes after Lew Grade – APF's owner and financial backer, who had been highly impressed by the 25-minute pilot version of "Trapped in the Sky" – ordered that the running time be doubled so that Thunderbirds would fill an hour-long TV timeslot. For "Pit of Peril", this involved adding new supporting elements in the form of the relief helijet and its crew (Lieutenant Mead, Sergeant Reynolds and Pilot Charlie) as well as a subplot in which the army personnel attempt to recover the Sidewinder using their own equipment before calling International Rescue. Continuity errors in the design of the army helicopter cockpit set distinguish the episode's original footage from the new scenes filmed during the reshoot.

"Pit of Peril" features only five of the regular puppet cast: Jeff, Scott, Virgil and John Tracy, and Brains. This is the lowest number of any Thunderbirds episode. The episode is also the only one of the series that does not have any female characters, though Sylvia Anderson and Christine Finn are credited on the end titles. The puppets that play Colonel Sweeney and Frank first appeared as Fireflash's Captain Hanson and his unnamed co-pilot in "Trapped in the Sky".

A scene set inside the pit uses camera movement and a carefully timed edit to give the impression that the Virgil puppet and scale model of the Mole are in the same shot, even though they were filmed by different units: when the camera pans away from the effects unit's shot of the Mole, its view passes through thick smoke, hiding a cut separating this footage from the puppet unit's shot of Virgil.

The episode was disliked by Gerry Anderson, who found it one of the most challenging episodes to make. In his biography, he described it as "an absolute pig of a film. For three weeks I kept cutting and re-cutting because we couldn't get it right. One night I said to the editor, 'Let it go. Cut the negative and dub it – we can't do anything more with this.'" Several weeks later, he was surprised when Abe Mandell, head of ITC's New York office, telephoned him after seeing the finished episode and called it "wonderful".

This episode marks the first use of Thunderbirds' regular ending theme music: a modified version of the instrumental that accompanies the launch of Thunderbird 1 in "Trapped in the Sky". The incidental music for "Pit of Peril", composed by Barry Gray was recorded on 24 April 1965 in a four-hour studio session with a 22-piece orchestra.

In 2025, an original version of the episode was discovered in which International Rescue only first learn of the disaster upon being contacted by General Peters.

=== Design ===
The Sidewinder's look was designed by director Desmond Saunders. The studio model used wood and card for the main body and chains of cake tins for the arms. According to special effects director Derek Meddings, the model was extremely difficult to film as it was hung on wires and an under-floor "scissor mechanism" was needed to move its legs. In his book 21st Century Visions, he commented that "fortunately the script required it to fall into a deep pit within minutes of appearing, so we didn't have to move it far." The Sidewinder control room set incorporated a console normally seen aboard Thunderbird 5.

"Pit of Peril" marks the first appearance of the Mole, which is also featured in the closing credits of this and all subsequent episodes. Its drill bit was made of wood fitted with a screw thread; the wood had to be turned manually as the effects team did not have a lathe. The simple interior set, which incorporated the Mobile Control console used by Scott, was embellished for future appearances. The episode also introduces Thunderbird 1's remote camera and the helijet, a type of VTOL aircraft that appears frequently in Thunderbirds and later Anderson series. The Recovery Vehicles, which do not appear in any other episodes, were designed by effects assistant Mike Trim in his first major design work for APF.

== Broadcast and reception ==
In the series' alternative two-part format that was broadcast in some UK regions, part one of "Pit of Peril" ended with Thunderbird 1 blasting off from Tracy Island while part two began with an abridged version of a scene in which the army personnel discuss the situation while standing at the edge of the pit. Several other scenes were also shortened.

=== Critical response ===
In her autobiography, Sylvia Anderson called the episode's theme of danger posed by hazardous waste "very much a contemporary problem". Tom Fox of Starburst magazine rates the episode three out of five, calling the Sidewinder a "great but hilariously awkward invention" and likening it to the giant mechanical spider in the film Wild Wild West (1999).

Simon Archer and Marcus Hearn describe "Pit of Peril" as one of several early Thunderbirds episodes that focus on "seemingly inescapable dangers on land, under the sea and in the air". For Chris Bentley, it is one of a number that use "incredible technology in a developing world as a springboard to disaster". Hearn praises the model-work, editing and music but calls the episode a "misfire", stating that Fennell's "relatively one-dimensional plot" was ill-suited to a longer, 50-minute running time. He compares the plot to that of Series Two's "Path of Destruction" but regards that episode as superior in nearly all respects. Bentley and Hearn also argue that the premise is similar to that of "Trapped in the Sky". Bentley writes that "Pit of Peril" "somewhat slavishly follows the formula" of its precursor, comparing the plight of the experimental Sidewinder to the sabotage of the new Fireflash airliner. He considers the Mole to be "lifted directly" from the Edgar Rice Burroughs novel At The Earth's Core (1914).

The Star Observer compares "Pit of Peril" favourably to the first episode but criticises its lack of female characters. In an essay analysing Thunderbirds along gender lines, Ian Haywood believes that the Sidewinder's fall into the pit reflects a broader conflict in the series between "masculine" science and "maternal" nature. According to Haywood, the army walker's undoing literally shows that "Mother Nature will not be walked over. Is this the transmogrified mother taking her revenge, or is she continuing her role as society's moral conscience?" Nicholas J. Cull views the Sidewinder's defeat by a 20th-century military dump as symbolic of "the way in which the political residue of one war can dog a future generation." He also considers the reference to brushfires "topical" for a TV episode made "in the opening years of the Vietnam conflict".

In a review of the series' soundtrack, Heather Phares of AllMusic cites the incidental piece "The Fate of the Sidewinder" as an example of how Barry Gray's work on Thunderbirds "[sent] up the spy and action/adventure conventions of the '60s very stylishly and subtly." She characterises the track as "only slightly more over the top than the scores for the James Bond films or for TV series like The Prisoner".
