= Day of Disaster =

- Thunderbirds episode
- Episode no.: Series 1 Episode 15
- Directed by: David Elliott
- Written by: Dennis Spooner
- Cinematography by: Julien Lugrin
- Editing by: Harry Ledger
- Production code: 15
- Original air date: 4 November 1965

Guest character voices
- Ray Barrett as Bridge Controller, Kirby & Dr Korda; Peter Dyneley as Professor Wingrove, Crane Operator & 1st TV Reporter; David Graham as Clayton, Frank, Chuck & Police Officer; Matt Zimmerman as Bill & 2nd TV Reporter

Episode chronology
← Previous "End of the Road"	Next → "Edge of Impact"

"Day of Disaster" is an episode of Thunderbirds, a British Supermarionation television series created by Gerry and Sylvia Anderson and filmed by their production company AP Films (later Century 21 Productions) for ITC Entertainment. Written by Dennis Spooner and directed by David Elliott, it was first broadcast on 4 November 1965 on ATV Midlands as the sixth episode of Series One. In the official running order, it is the 15th episode.

Set in the 2060s, Thunderbirds follows the missions of International Rescue, a secret organisation which uses technologically advanced rescue vehicles to save human life. The lead characters are ex-astronaut Jeff Tracy, founder of International Rescue, and his five adult sons, who pilot the organisation's primary vehicles: the Thunderbird machines. In "Day of Disaster", a space probe being transported to its launch site sinks to the bottom of a river following a bridge collapse, trapping two engineers underwater and triggering the probe's automatic countdown. International Rescue must race to save the two men before the compromised craft is destroyed on blast-off.

The events of "Day of Disaster" are recounted in flashback in the clip show episode "Security Hazard". In 1967, Century 21 released a condensed audio adaptation of "Day of Disaster" on EP record (Thunderbirds, catalogue number MA 121), with narration by David Graham in character as Gordon Tracy. The episode had its first UK‑wide network broadcast on 6 December 1991 on BBC2.

== Plot ==
In the Tracy Island lounge, Grandma reports that she has lost her edible transmitter (a personal homing device). Jeff concludes that someone has accidentally eaten it and suspects one of his sons, but a simple process of elimination reveals that he himself is the culprit. Jeff leaves the lounge to take a transmitter-dissolving medicine while a highly amused Alan laughs into a magazine.

While visiting Lady Penelope in England, Brains watches television coverage of the transport of the Martian Space Probe (MSP). Due to Mars' position relative to Earth, the probe is to be launched from England instead of Cape Kennedy. Two engineers, Bill and Frank, are aboard the probe rocket's command module in the nose cone, carrying out pre-flight checks while it is driven to the launch site on the back of a transporter truck. Disaster strikes when the Allington River Suspension Bridge, which had been weakened by a storm, collapses; the load is well within the overall capacity of the bridge, but not as a concentrated mass, and the Bridge Controller and Clayton were under pressure to allow the probe to cross. The rocket sinks to the riverbed, in an upright launch position, and covered in debris from the bridge. The impact sets off the probe's automatic launch countdown: after 12 hours, the rocket will blast off and kill both men.

Brains and Penelope rush to the bridge in FAB 1, driven by Parker. Penelope and Parker arrange a diversion by using the car's machine gun to blow up the disused Allington Research Centre nearby, drawing sightseers and enabling Brains to slip into the bridge control centre, where the Controller and Clayton are arranging to clear the debris from the rocket using antiquated floating cranes. The officious Controller dismisses Brains' suggestion of calling International Rescue and orders him to keep out of the way, while Clayton wearily apologises for his associate, and tells Brains to stand silent. Brains quietly contacts John on his personal InterCall wrist videophone – to the astonishment of the Controller and Clayton, who think that he is talking to an ordinary watch, leading them to suspect he is an escaped mental patient. With Brains directing the International Rescue operation himself, Jeff dispatches Scott, Virgil and Gordon in Thunderbirds 1 and 2, the latter carrying Thunderbird 4. At the bridge, the wreckage proves too heavy for the cranes, one of which capsizes and sinks, disabling another.

The Tracys arrive and set to work freeing the nose cone. Thunderbird 4 is launched and Gordon uses the submersible's plasma torch to cut through the debris, which Virgil lifts clear using Thunderbird 2's electromagnetic grab lines. With time running out, Brains suggests that Gordon should blow away the rest of the debris with missiles, then ram the nose cone to separate it from the rocket. The plan is successful and the nose cone floats to the surface, where Thunderbird 2 carries it away, just narrowly before the rocket launches from the riverbed, shoots out of the river, and explodes in mid-air.

Brains is overjoyed and starts dancing in the control room, to the bemusement of the Controller and Clayton. He is referred to psychiatrist Dr R.G. Korda, who is asking him about his habit of "talking to watches" when Penelope arrives to take him home. Watching them depart, Korda witnesses Penelope talking to her compact, unaware that it is a concealed transceiver she is using to call Scott, prompting Korda to consider getting himself seen by a psychiatrist. Back at her mansion, Lady Penelope, Brains, Scott, Virgil and Gordon are relaxing when Jeff calls them via Penelope's flashing teapot and Scott answers it. Brains says if Scott's "talking to teapots, there's a guy I think you oughtta see…" prompting laughter from everyone.

== Regular voice cast ==
- Sylvia Anderson as Lady Penelope
- Ray Barrett as John Tracy
- Peter Dyneley as Jeff Tracy
- Christine Finn as Tin-Tin Kyrano and Grandma Tracy
- David Graham as Gordon Tracy, Brains and Parker
- David Holliday as Virgil Tracy
- Shane Rimmer as Scott Tracy
- Matt Zimmerman as Alan Tracy

== Production ==
The miniature model appearing as the MSP transporter truck was originally a fire engine in the episode "City of Fire". The shots of the MSP in transit were accompanied by the archive incidental music piece "March of the Oysters", originally composed for the Stingray episode "Secret of the Giant Oyster"; the piece is also heard in "30 Minutes After Noon", "The Impostors", "The Cham-Cham" and "Security Hazard" (via the "Day" flashback).

Dr Korda was named after either Alexander Korda or Dr Roger Corder, protagonist of the TV series The Human Jungle.

== Reception ==
Tom Fox of Starburst magazine rates the episode 3 out of 5, praising its "friendly little attempts at comedy". Fred McNamara praises the episode's "character-enlivened humour", in particular, the "amusing" Tracy family banter about the edible transmitter and the chemistry between Penelope and Brains. He notes that Brains' invitation to witnessing the Martian Space Probe launch entails an "amusing culture clash between the pair in how Americans drink their tea – a neat reminder of Thunderbirds' transatlantic appeal".

For Chris Bentley, "Day of Disaster" is one of several Thunderbirds scripts by either Spooner or Alan Fennell that use "incredible technology in a developing world as a springboard to disaster". Sam Denham describes "Day of Disaster" as a "classic 'doomed technology' episode" of Thunderbirds, commenting that its premise about an ill-fated space probe is one of several that "reflected a growing concern in the 1960s that the pace of progress may have been moving too fast". He adds that judging by the guest characters' surprised reactions to Brains and Penelope's communication devices, the episode may be implying "there are certain types of technology that only International Rescue can be trusted with".

According to Marcus Hearn, the subplot about the swallowed transmitter – "entirely unconnected to anything else in the episode" – is perhaps "the most baffling sequence" in Thunderbirds. He also comments that the episode plays with national stereotypes – arguing, for example, that Peter Dyneley's use of an affected German accent while voicing a rocket scientist (Professor Wingrove) was an acknowledgement of German scientists' contributions to the Space Race. He adds that psychiatrist Dr Korda "is, of course, Austrian", while the presence of an American space probe in Britain "presents a refreshing picture of Anglo-American relations".
