= The Mighty Atom (Thunderbirds) =

- Thunderbirds episode
- Episode no.: Series 1 Episode 6
- Directed by: David Lane
- Written by: Dennis Spooner
- Cinematography by: Paddy Seale
- Editing by: Harry Ledger
- Production code: 6
- Original air date: 30 December 1965

Guest character voices
- Sylvia Anderson as; Australia Plant Announcer: Ray Barrett as; Controller Wade General Speyer Security Guard Australia Plant Fire Chief: Peter Dyneley as; Professor Holden 1st Reporter: David Graham as; Controller Collins Australia Plant Tour Guide: David Holliday as; Conference Delegate: Shane Rimmer as; Australia Plant Assistant Controller: Matt Zimmerman as; 2nd Reporter Speyer's Press Officer

Episode chronology
← Previous "The Uninvited"	Next → "Vault of Death"

"The Mighty Atom" is an episode of Thunderbirds, a British Supermarionation television series created by Gerry and Sylvia Anderson and filmed by their production company AP Films for ITC Entertainment. Written by Dennis Spooner and directed by David Lane, it was first broadcast on 30 December 1965 on ATV Midlands as the 14th episode of Series One. It is the sixth episode in the official running order.

Set in the 2060s, the series follows the exploits of International Rescue, an organisation that uses technologically advanced rescue vehicles to save human life. The main characters are ex-astronaut Jeff Tracy, founder of International Rescue, and his five adult sons, who pilot the organisation's main vehicles: the Thunderbird machines. In "The Mighty Atom", the Tracys' nemesis the Hood attacks atomic irrigation plants in Australia and the Sahara.

== Plot ==
Some time before the creation of International Rescue, the Hood is spying on an atomic-powered irrigation plant in an Australian desert when he is discovered and challenged by a security guard. A gunfight ensues and one of the Hood's bullets hits a gas cylinder, starting a fire that quickly consumes the facility. Unable to shut down the nuclear reactor, Controller Wade and his staff are airlifted to safety before the plant is destroyed in an atomic explosion. A radioactive cloud looks set to engulf Melbourne but is ultimately dispersed by strong winds.

One year later, the disguised Hood hypnotises delegates at a science conference and steals the "Mighty Atom" – an artificially-intelligent roaming surveillance device that looks like a mouse. Travelling to the Sahara, he uses the Mighty Atom to photograph the interior of a new, automated irrigation plant maintained by Wade and his assistant Collins. He then decides to exploit the situation further by creating a disaster to which the newly formed International Rescue will respond, giving him an opportunity to use the device to steal the secrets of the Thunderbird machines. To this end, he detonates explosive devices around the plant's reactor, fatally destabilising it.

With a second nuclear explosion inevitable and rescue by the wind unlikely, Wade realises that the consequences for the region will be devastating. He calls International Rescue for help and Jeff Tracy dispatches Scott in Thunderbird 1. Lady Penelope, who is visiting Tracy Island with Parker and is eager to accompany the Tracy brothers on a mission, leaves with Virgil and Gordon in Thunderbird 2 carrying Pod 4.

When Thunderbird 2 reaches the North African coast, Gordon launches in Thunderbird 4 and proceeds to the plant's seawater inlet. Thunderbird 2 continues to the plant, where Scott and Virgil don protective suits and enter the reactor room to realign the control rods and restabilise the reactor. Gordon then destroys the inlet with a torpedo, cutting off the seawater intake at just the right moment to prevent the reactor from exploding.

Left alone in Thunderbird 2, Penelope, who is afraid of mice, screams when confronted by the Mighty Atom as it prepares to photograph the cockpit. Later, at his temple in Malaysia, the Hood connects the device to a computer to view the stored images – which, he is dismayed to find, are all of Penelope's terrified face. In a fit of rage, he destroys the Mighty Atom by repeatedly smashing it with his fist.

== Regular voice cast ==
- Sylvia Anderson as Lady Penelope
- Ray Barrett as John Tracy and the Hood
- Peter Dyneley as Jeff Tracy
- Christine Finn as Tin-Tin Kyrano and Grandma Tracy
- David Graham as Gordon Tracy, Brains, Parker and Kyrano
- David Holliday as Virgil Tracy
- Shane Rimmer as Scott Tracy
- Matt Zimmerman as Alan Tracy

== Production ==
One of 11 Thunderbirds scripts that were originally filmed as 25 minutes and later extended, "The Mighty Atom" was initially set almost entirely in the Sahara, with events in Australia being recalled briefly in flashback. To lengthen the story, the series' writing team effectively split the episode in two by prefacing the main action with two new acts showing the Australian nuclear disaster in detail, as well as the Hood's theft of the Mighty Atom. Due to this expansion, the first 18 minutes of the completed episode feature none of the regular characters.

"The Mighty Atom" is the only episode of Thunderbirds to feature all of the regular characters and all of the Thunderbird machines. It also marks the first appearance of Thunderbird 4 on a rescue mission.

== Broadcast and reception ==
The two-part version that was broadcast in some UK regions separates the older footage from the material that was filmed for the episode's expansion. Certain scenes were altered to create this format; these include one of a news conference in Melbourne, which was shortened, and another in which the Tracy brothers play a practical joke on Lady Penelope, which was removed completely.

=== Critical response ===
"The Mighty Atom" is named the worst episode of Thunderbirds by TV Zone magazine. Commenting that "for the first half of the episode we're left wondering where International Rescue is", the review also notes the ineptitude of the Hood and criticises the episode's "lazy" writing, point out that the villain's plans are thwarted by nothing more than Penelope's fear of mice. Tom Fox of Starburst magazine is more positive, arguing that the episode contains "plenty of curious aspects" to compensate for the Hood's "outlandish" plans; he gives a rating of three out of five.

Chris Bentley, author of The Complete Book of Thunderbirds, describes the episode as "surprisingly effective" despite International Rescue's absence from most of its first half. He regards the scenes featuring the radioactive cloud as some of the "eeriest" of the series. Marcus Hearn, author of Thunderbirds: The Vault, considers the "sinister" music accompanying these scenes to be the episode's most effective element; however, he believes that the appearance of Penelope and Parker "clutters" the plot. He also argues that Penelope's phobia "diminishes" her character just as the Hood's ill-conceived plans lead the viewer to suspect that he "may not be quite the criminal mastermind his reputation suggests".

In her 1991 autobiography, Sylvia Anderson wrote that the Mighty Atom itself "strains credibility" while comparing the nuclear explosion in the episode's first act to the real-life Chernobyl disaster. Michael Park of the website WhatCulture expresses similar thoughts, arguing that the episode essentially "predicted" Chernobyl: "... at the height of the Cold War, this episode will have given a lot of children (and adults) sleepless nights." Media historian Nicholas J. Cull notes that like "The Man from MI.5" and "Atlantic Inferno", "The Mighty Atom" plays on themes of "nuclear weapons and wider nuclear fears in general".

Fred McNamara of the website ScreenRelish considers a scene in which Parker and Kyrano fight over which of them should be allowed to serve drinks to be the fourth-best moment of the entire series: "... it's hard for any Thunderbirds fan not to smirk slightly when watching this, and knowing that both Kyrano and Parker had their voices provided by the same actor!"
