= City of Fire (Thunderbirds) =

- Thunderbirds episode
- Episode no.: Series 1 Episode 3
- Directed by: David Elliott
- Written by: Alan Fennell
- Cinematography by: Julien Lugrin
- Editing by: Harry Ledger
- Production code: 3
- Original air date: 6 January 1966

Guest character voices
- Sylvia Anderson as Blanche and Tommy Carter; Ray Barrett as Joe Carter; Peter Dyneley as the fire chief; Christine Finn as the driver; David Graham as the assistant controller and the driver's husband; Matt Zimmerman as the controller and a TV reporter

Episode chronology
← Previous "Pit of Peril"	Next → "Sun Probe"

"City of Fire" is an episode of Thunderbirds, a British Supermarionation television series created by Gerry and Sylvia Anderson and filmed by their production company AP Films (APF) for ITC Entertainment. Written by Alan Fennell and directed by David Elliott, it was first broadcast on 6 January 1966 on ATV Midlands as the 15th episode of Series One. It is the third episode in the official running order.

Set in the 2060s, Thunderbirds follows the missions of International Rescue, a secret organisation that uses technologically advanced rescue vehicles to save human life. The lead characters are ex-astronaut Jeff Tracy, founder of International Rescue, and his five adult sons, who pilot the organisation's primary fleet of vehicles: the Thunderbird machines. In "City of Fire", Scott and Virgil rush to save a family trapped in the parking garage beneath a burning skyscraper, using potentially dangerous oxyhydnite cutting gas to do so.

In 1992, Fennell and artist Keith Watson adapted the episode into a comic strip which was serialised in issues 15 to 17 of Thunderbirds: The Comic. The strip was republished as a graphic album later that year.

== Plot ==
The newly opened Thompson Tower skyscraper is a two-mile-tall (3.2 km), 350-storey shopping complex and self-contained city which stocks every commercial item produced. Among its first visitors are the Carter family, comprising married couple Joe and Blanche and their young son, Tommy. Leaving their car in the basement car park, they look for a way up to the tower but get lost in a maze of corridors. As they try to get their bearings, a car crash in the car park causes a fire that consumes the basement and threatens the tower above it.

In an attempt to contain the blaze, the tower's controllers close all the corridor bulkheads. Having inadvertently stepped into a video surveillance blind spot, the Carters are missed by the security cameras in their corridor and are sealed in before the controllers notice their presence. Despite the containment effort, the fire passes through the ceiling vents on each floor and engulfs the tower. Due to an electrical failure, the controllers cannot raise the bulkheads, trapping the Carters underground as their corridor fills with smoke. Firefighters are unable to bring the blaze under control, and although everyone above ground is evacuated, the tower is set to collapse. With no way to reach the Carters, the Tower Controller calls International Rescue for help.

On Tracy Island, Scott and Virgil have been recovering from the side effects of Brains' new, faster-acting cutting gas. Informed of the tower's emergency call by John on Thunderbird 5, Jeff dispatches Scott and Virgil to the disaster zone in Thunderbirds 1 and 2, the latter carrying the Firefly and the Mole. By the time both brothers arrive, the tower has fallen and the basement roof is buckling under the weight of the wreckage. Scott and Virgil realise that the only way to reach the Carters in time is to cut through the fire doors with the oxyhydnite equipment, whatever the risks from the side effects.

Virgil uses the Firefly to clear the burning remains of the Thompson Tower from the area. He then joins Scott in the Mole as they tunnel into the corridor system half a mile from the trapped family. The Tracys quickly cut their way through the numerous fire doors, with no ill effects from the oxyhydnite gas, and manage to rescue the Carters just as the corridor roof caves in. The underground corridors collapse, but the Tracys and the Carters escape to the surface in the Mole, to the relief of the Tower Controller.

Back on Tracy Island, Brains realises that the extreme heat in the underground corridors negated the side effects of the oxyhydnite gas. With electrically heated tanks in place, the equipment will be safe to use in any conditions on future rescue operations.

== Regular voice cast ==
- Ray Barrett as John Tracy
- Peter Dyneley as Jeff Tracy
- Christine Finn as Tin-Tin Kyrano
- David Graham as Brains
- David Holliday as Virgil Tracy
- Shane Rimmer as Scott Tracy
- Matt Zimmerman as Alan Tracy

== Production ==
"City of Fire" is one of several early episodes of Thunderbirds that were initially 25 minutes long, only being extended to 50 minutes after Lew Grade – APF's chairman, who had been highly impressed by the pilot version of the first episode, "Trapped in the Sky" – told Gerry Anderson to double the running time so that Thunderbirds could fill a one-hour timeslot. Originally filmed in 1964, "City of Fire" was lengthened in 1965 with new material including the appearance of the Firefly, scenes showing the aftermath of the tower collapse and the Tracy brothers off-duty at base, and the subplot about Brains' new cutting gas. In the 1964 script, the gas was not presented as experimental or dangerous, and Scott and Virgil had no reservations about using it to save the Carters. The additional scenes were filmed around the same time as the episodes "The Impostors" and "Cry Wolf".

The episode is one of two to feature a rescue involving the Firefly, the other being "Terror in New York City". It is also the first episode in the production order to feature the hoverjets: flying platforms used by the Tracys to navigate unstable terrain. A variation on the "jetmobiles" of Fireball XL5 and "monocopters" of Stingray, these vehicles also appear in "Vault of Death", "Martian Invasion", "Cry Wolf" and "Attack of the Alligators!" The Tracy Island "auto-nurse" – a device which monitors the recuperating Scott and Virgil's vital functions – was adapted from a prop featured in Stingray.

== Broadcast and reception ==
"City of Fire" was first broadcast on 6 January 1966 by the ATV Midlands franchise of the ITV network. Franchises which transmitted Thunderbirds episodes in two parts omitted a scene showing Thunderbird 1's arrival at the tower as well as some of the dialogue about the tower's evacuation and predicted collapse. The episode had its first UK-wide network transmission on 4 October 1991 on BBC2.

=== Critical response ===
Several commentators have compared "City of Fire"'s premise to the 1974 disaster film The Towering Inferno, in which a fire engulfs a newly built San Francisco office building. Marcus Hearn notes that like the film, "City of Fire" is told mainly from the perspective of those trapped by the blaze – though whereas the film has an ensemble cast, "City of Fire" focuses on one family because of its limited budget.

Matthew Dennis of cultbox.co.uk regards "City of Fire" as one of Thunderbirds' "slickest and most entertaining" episodes, praising its fast-paced plot and "truly spectacular visuals". He states that the Tracys' use of experimental cutting equipment at risk to themselves makes the episode an "involving and exciting watch". For Chris Bentley, "City of Fire" is a "tense and exciting instalment with well-drawn characters". He finds it very similar to "Pit of Peril", another Fennell script that sees characters trapped below ground and threatened by fire being rescued with the help of the Mole. Rating the episode three out of five, Tom Fox of Starburst magazine considers the ineffectiveness of the tower's fire control systems implausible but describes the special effects as enjoyable "in their dinky way". The Star Observer calls the episode a "childhood favourite" and a "fabulous burning building potboiler", adding: "This one had almost everything."

The episode has also drawn comment for its depiction of technological progress and future living. Noting that the production of Thunderbirds coincided with the emergence of supermarkets, which were drawing shoppers away from small specialist stores towards larger general ones, Ian Fryer argues that Thompson Tower – described in dialogue as a "self-contained city" comprising every product made on Earth – "takes this idea to its logical conclusion." For Hearn, the tower serves as a "soulless and slightly sinister model of high-rise living" which betrays Thunderbirds' "underlying pessimism" about technology. Hearn also writes that the woman driver's recklessness, combined with the tower authorities' inability to protect the Carters and the Tracys' obligation to use the cutting gas, results in a "cautionary tale of human fallibility".

Hearn adds that while "City of Fire" is often prescient in its vision of the future, as demonstrated by the tower's video surveillance system and "Goldfinger-inspired architecture", the episode strikes an incongruous note with the woman driver who accidentally causes the fire, whose portrayal Hearn regards as sexist. (In the penultimate scene, Tin-Tin Kyrano, reading a newspaper report on the fire, tells Scott: "Yes, you've guessed it. The driver was female.") Others have commented on this characterisation. In her autobiography, Sylvia Anderson expressed surprise at the episode's use of the "'female driver' myth". Nicholas J. Cull writes that the episode is one of several to include outdated "gendered humour", while according to Fryer, the driver is an object of old-fashioned "sexist stereotyping".
