= Cry Wolf (Thunderbirds) =

- Thunderbirds episode
- Episode no.: Series 1 Episode 21
- Directed by: David Elliott
- Written by: Dennis Spooner
- Cinematography by: Paddy Seale
- Editing by: Harry MacDonald
- Production code: 21
- Original air date: 27 January 1966

Guest character voices
- Sylvia Anderson as Bob Williams; Ray Barrett as Mr Williams; Christine Finn as Tony Williams; David Graham as Colonel Jameson and the Sergeant; Matt Zimmerman as Lieutenant Lansfield

Episode chronology
← Previous "The Man from MI.5"	Next → "Danger at Ocean Deep"

"Cry Wolf" is an episode of Thunderbirds, a British Supermarionation television series created by Gerry and Sylvia Anderson and filmed by their production company AP Films for ITC Entertainment. Written by Dennis Spooner and directed by David Elliott, it was first broadcast on 27 January 1966 on ATV Midlands as the 18th episode of Series One. In the official running order, it is the 21st episode. The episode had its first UK‑wide network broadcast on 31 January 1992 on BBC2.

Set in the 2060s, Thunderbirds follows the missions of International Rescue, a secret organisation which uses technologically advanced rescue vehicles to save human life. The lead characters are ex-astronaut Jeff Tracy, founder of International Rescue, and his five adult sons, who pilot the organisation's main vehicles: the Thunderbird machines. International Rescue's work is repeatedly disrupted by master criminal the Hood. In "Cry Wolf", two young Australian brothers who hero-worship the Tracy brothers get carried away during a game of "International Rescue" and transmit a false distress call. Thunderbird 1 is dispatched to their location in the Outback and pilot Scott Tracy discovers that no one needs rescuing. The misunderstanding is amicably resolved, but when the Hood traps the brothers in a collapsing mine and steals satellite reconnaissance from their father – a tracking station controller – the boys call International Rescue to report a real emergency, only to find that the Tracys do not believe them.

== Plot ==
Thunderbird 5 receives a call from Bob Williams, a young Australian boy who claims to have fallen from a cliff. Thunderbird 1 is launched, but on reaching Bob's location in the Northern Territory, pilot Scott Tracy witnesses the boy being "rescued" by his brother Tony. Realising that the call was part of a children's game, Scott demands an explanation from the boy's father, a weather station operator. Mr Williams explains that his sons idolise International Rescue and enjoy role-playing as them. Their mother is deceased, and Williams is too busy to keep a close eye on them, so he made them walkie-talkies to keep them entertained. Taking pity on the boys, Scott flies them to Tracy Island to for a guided tour of the base before they return home aboard Thunderbird 2.

The story is picked up on by the Hood who realises the weather station to be a cover for a government project and he sets off to track down the Williamses and steal classified information. His suspicions are well founded: the station is actually Dunsley Tracker, a spy satellite ground station where Mr Williams processes photographs of enemy military installations for Colonel Jameson of Satellite HQ.

Tony and Bob are playing another game of "International Rescue". Disguised as a surveyor, the Hood tricks Tony into hiding in an abandoned mine. After Bob ventures in to "rescue" Tony, the Hood detonates a bomb, triggering a cave-in that traps the brothers under a beam. With the boys out of the way, the Hood drives his off-road vehicle to the Williams homestead to steal the Dunsley Tracker surveillance. Almost succumbing to the Hood's hypnotic powers, Williams, in the control room with the photographs, radios Satellite HQ for help. Jameson says that it will be hours before they can reach him, but Williams points out that International Rescue are faster.

With the mine roof set to collapse, Tony and Bob call International Rescue. The Tracys ignore the boys, thinking that they are just playing again, realising the emergency only when Jameson calls on Williams' behalf. Scott blasts off in Thunderbird 1 to help Williams while Virgil and Alan take Thunderbird 2 to rescue the boys.

The Hood uses a cutting torch to burn through the control room door. He hypnotises Williams and seizes the photographs before Williams can destroy them. Landing nearby and proceeding on hoverbike, Scott confronts the Hood just as the villain is driving away. The ensuing chase ends when the Hood inadvertently goes over a cliff and is thrown out of his vehicle and into a lake. While Scott recovers the photographs from the crashed vehicle, Virgil and Alan reach the mine and extract Tony and Bob moments before the roof falls. The episode ends light-heartedly as the boys invite Scott to try their bedroom's "emergency exit", which deposits Scott on a go-kart painted to resemble Thunderbird 2.

== Regular voice cast ==
- Ray Barrett as John Tracy and the Hood
- Peter Dyneley as Jeff Tracy
- Christine Finn as Tin-Tin Kyrano and Grandma Tracy
- David Graham as Gordon Tracy and Brains
- David Holliday as Virgil Tracy
- Shane Rimmer as Scott Tracy
- Matt Zimmerman as Alan Tracy

== Production ==
The miniature model representing the satellite Mr Williams is monitoring originally appeared as Space Observatory 3 in "The Impostors". The Satellite HQ building, interiors and characters were also reused from that episode, with the puppet that played General Lambert returning as Colonel Jameson. Tony and Bob traverse Thunderbird 2's pod vehicle hangar in a monorail car adapted from an earlier appearance in "The Uninvited". The model representing the Williams homestead previously appeared as Grandma Tracy's cottage in "Move – and You're Dead", while the prop serving as Mr Williams' desk was originally Professor Matic's desk in Fireball XL5.

== Reception ==
Fran Pheasant-Kelly, an academic who has studied Thunderbirds from a sociological perspective, notes that in its depiction of Tony and Bob, the episode "perhaps sends a message about the dangers of talking to strangers and about 'crying wolf'". Richard Farrell writes that the story and choice of title are influenced by the Aesop's Fable The Boy Who Cried Wolf, adding that the episode "plays a bit like a public information film".

Rating "Cry Wolf" three out of five, Tom Fox of Starburst magazine argues that the moral of the story is well worn and the episode "never feels very well fleshed out." He praises the Hood's strategy for its entertainment value but finds Tony and Bob "fairly annoying". Marcus Hearn, who describes the episode as a "sentimental tale", suggests that the scenes of the Hood tricking the boys into the mine would make a 21st-century audience uneasy. He compares the episode to Stingray's "A Christmas to Remember", also written by Spooner, in which the regular characters of that series host an orphan boy for Christmas. Hearn praises the "moment of pathos" when it is explained that Tony and Bob's mother died, thus explaining why Scott softens towards the boys after their earlier transgression.

For screenwriter Peter Briggs, "Cry Wolf" is one of three Thunderbirds episodes (the others being "Security Hazard" and "Give or Take a Million") which can be classed as "kid wish fulfilment shows": all three episodes depict young fans of International Rescue being granted the opportunity to visit their heroes on Tracy Island.
