= End of the Road (Thunderbirds) =

- Thunderbirds episode
- Episode no.: Series 1 Episode 14
- Directed by: David Lane
- Written by: Dennis Spooner
- Cinematography by: Paddy Seale
- Editing by: Harry MacDonald
- Production code: 14
- Original air date: 25 November 1965

Guest character voices
- Ray Barrett as Eddie Houseman & J.B. Lester; David Graham as Bob Gray, Cheng & Engineer; Matt Zimmerman as Chuck Taylor

Episode chronology
← Previous "Terror in New York City"	Next → "Day of Disaster"

"End of the Road" is an episode of Thunderbirds, a British Supermarionation television series created by Gerry and Sylvia Anderson and filmed by their production company AP Films (later Century 21 Productions) for ITC Entertainment. Written by Dennis Spooner and directed by David Lane, it was first broadcast on 25 November 1965 on ATV Midlands as the ninth episode of Series One. It is the 14th episode in the official running order.

Set in the 2060s, Thunderbirds follows the missions of International Rescue, a secret organisation which uses technologically advanced rescue vehicles to save human life. The lead characters are ex‑astronaut Jeff Tracy, founder of International Rescue, and his five adult sons, who pilot the organisation's primary vehicles: the Thunderbird machines. In "End of the Road", a construction company is under pressure to lay a road through a mountain range before monsoon season. In his haste to complete the job, civil engineer Eddie Houseman plants explosive charges that leave his vehicle teetering on a cliff edge. International Rescue must save Eddie, who was a former flame of Tin-Tin and who had just visited Tracy Island, without revealing their identities to him.

In 1966, Century 21 released an audio adaptation of "End of the Road" on vinyl EP record (Thunderbird 2, catalogue number MA 109) with narration from voice actor David Graham as regular character Brains. The episode had its first UK‑wide network broadcast on 10 January 1992 on BBC2.

== Plot ==
The Gray & Houseman Construction company is building a road through a mountain range in Southeast Asia, but the contract must be completed before the monsoon season. While co-founder Eddie Houseman captains an explosives truck which blasts a pathway through the mountains, his business partner Bob Gray heads the company's multi-storey Road Construction Vehicle, which tarmacs the path Eddie has cut.

Finishing the explosives work, Eddie leaves the final part of the job to Bob and takes a vacation; he pays a call on his old girlfriend Tin-Tin Kyrano on Tracy Island. The unexpected visit forces Jeff to initiate the "Operation Cover-Up" security protocols to hide all trace of International Rescue. Alan is less than pleased to see Tin-Tin's old flame sweeping her off her feet again, and is teased by Virgil and Gordon.

Back at the road construction project, the mountain range is crumbling into the pathway cleared by Eddie and will never survive the monsoon. When Eddie hears the news, he immediately leaves without saying goodbye to Tin-Tin, upsetting her. Alan is tactless in his efforts to console her, creating a rift between them. Grandma promises to help Alan get back into favour.

Aboard the Construction Vehicle, Eddie and Bob argue over solutions to the crisis. Eddie proposes planting nutomic charges on the unstable peak which will cause it to fall away from the road, but Bob, the senior partner, refuses to let Eddie risk his life and insists on postponing the project until spring – even though this will likely bankrupt the company if the deadline is not met. Unheeding Bob's voice of reason, Eddie quietly sets off in the explosives truck and plants charges along the cutting. The seismograph on the Construction Vehicle alerts Bob and the others to a possible landslide. Discovering that Eddie has left, Bob radios the truck to warn him; the peak about to collapse, Eddie fires the charges while still too close and although the loose rock is dispersed, saving the road, the blast leaves his tractor teetering on the edge of the mountain trail. Trapped inside, Eddie is unable to move without upsetting the truck's balance; worse to come, he still has a case of unstable nutomic charges on board: if the truck falls, it will explode on impact with the ground. Falling rocks threaten to overbalance the truck.

Bob calls International Rescue; although going to Eddie's aid presents a security risk, Jeff refuses to abandon the organisation's humanitarian principles. Scott, Virgil and Alan set off in Thunderbirds 1 and 2. Grandma tells Tin-Tin that Alan was insisted on going on the rescue despite being ill.

Arriving in Thunderbird 1, Scott fires long steel spears into the cliff face to protect Eddie from the boulders. Virgil and Alan lower Thunderbird 2's magnetic grabs and move in to pick up the truck, but are forced to back away when the craft's vertical jets start to tip the tractor over the edge. Scott carefully manoeuvres Thunderbird 1's nose cone to prop up the truck, bearing the load while Virgil and Alan complete the lift. Proving too heavy for the grabs, the truck slips loose, falls to the ground and explodes – but not before Eddie leaps clear. With Eddie safe, the Tracys immediately depart without landing, preventing Eddie from identifying them. Tin-Tin calls Alan to express concern for his health, and to Grandma's delight, the pair agree to talk as soon as Alan gets home.

== Regular voice cast ==
- Ray Barrett as John Tracy
- Peter Dyneley as Jeff Tracy
- Christine Finn as Tin-Tin Kyrano and Grandma Tracy
- David Graham as Gordon Tracy and Kyrano
- David Holliday as Virgil Tracy
- Shane Rimmer as Scott Tracy
- Matt Zimmerman as Alan Tracy

== Production ==
As originally scripted, the episode did not feature a love triangle between Alan Tracy, Tin-Tin Kyrano and Eddie Houseman; the subplot about Eddie and Tin-Tin's relationship, and Alan's rivalry with Eddie, was added later to help fill in the 50-minute running time. Marcus Hearn notes that the invented term "nutomic" was frequently used in the Andersons' earlier series Fireball XL5.

Eddie's explosives truck was designed by special effects assistant Mike Trim. The filming model was built using parts of the International Rescue transmitter truck from "Sun Probe". The puppet-scale set representing the truck's interior featured controls and seats previously seen in "Trapped in the Sky", "The Uninvited" and "Martian Invasion". A shot of Eddie landing on the ground after jumping clear of the truck used a puppet of Scott Tracy instead of the Eddie guest character. The incidental music was recorded on 7 May 1965 with a 24-member ensemble.

Scenes from "End of the Road" appear as a flashback in the clip show episode "Security Hazard", which features a modified version of Eddie's truck as an International Rescue firefighting vehicle.

== Reception ==
In her autobiography, Sylvia Anderson wrote that the episode casts Tin-Tin as a "beautiful diversion"; she commented elsewhere that the character is also objectified in "Edge of Impact" when she keeps Colonel Casey out of the way to prevent him from realising that the Tracys are International Rescue.

Marcus Hearn acknowledges the episode's "relatively sophisticated emotional dilemmas", noting especially the "element of domestic tension" provided by the romantic rivalry between Alan, Tin-Tin and Eddie. He adds that Alan and Tin-Tin's reconciliation – as well as International Rescue's commitment to saving Eddie, despite the risk to its security – shows that there is "no place for moral ambiguity or unhappy endings" in the series. He suggests that Eddie and Bob Gray's "boardroom drama-style" confrontation was influenced by The Plane Makers, a drama series about power struggles among the staff of an aircraft factory. (Hearn points out that this series was a favourite of Gerry Anderson.)

Mark Braxton praises the romantic storyline for its realism, particularly during the scene in which Virgil and Gordon make fun of Alan, as well as how the Tracys acting their public life while Eddie is on the island "leads neatly" to when they have to save Eddie who might identify them. In contrast, Tom Fox of Starburst magazine calls the subplot "lightweight", also describing Tin-Tin's falling out with Alan as "stereotypical petulance". He rates the episode three out of five, judging it "semi-suspenseful".

Anderson commentator Andrew Clements praises the episode's "simple but effective" story, in particular, the character development of Eddie, the iconic scenery and the intense rescue scene.

For Braxton, "End of the Road" is one of a number of episodes – also including "Pit of Peril" and "Path of Destruction" – which incorporate themes of "mechanisation despoiling the natural world". He considers the focus on road-building highly topical for 1960s Britain, pointing out that this decade saw the construction of many motorways as well as changes in road speed limits. Braxton also notes the episode's portrayal of the "destructive potential of workplace pressures", viewing this as a forerunner of the interpersonal conflicts depicted in the Andersons' live-action series UFO. He argues that Eddie and Gray's disagreements over company direction characterise them as "two sides of the corporate coin". Summing up, Braxton concludes that although the plot is heavily dependent on coincidence, its "richly satisfying mix" of themes keeps the audience entertained.
