= The Cham-Cham =

- Thunderbirds episode
- Tin-Tin (left) and Lady Penelope (right) skiing at Paradise Peaks. Simon Archer and Marcus Hearn consider this sequence to be one of several "unforgettable images" in the episode.
- Episode no.: Series 1 Episode 25
- Directed by: Alan Pattillo
- Written by: Alan Pattillo
- Cinematography by: Julien Lugrin
- Editing by: Harry Ledger
- Production code: 25
- Original air date: 24 March 1966

Guest character voices
- Ray Barrett as Cass Carnaby, Matthews Field Commander & Radio Maxwell DJ; Christine Finn as Telephone Operator; David Graham as Olsen, Captain Savidge & Hitchins; John Tate (uncredited) as Maxie, Scheiler & Enemy Colonel; Matt Zimmerman as Banino, Macklin & Enemy Lieutenant

Episode chronology
← Previous "Attack of the Alligators!"	Next → "Security Hazard"

"The Cham-Cham" is the 25th episode of Thunderbirds, a British Supermarionation television series created by Gerry and Sylvia Anderson and filmed by their production company AP Films (APF). The penultimate episode of Thunderbirds Series One, it was written and directed by Alan Pattillo and first broadcast on 24 March 1966 on ATV Midlands.

Set in the 2060s, Thunderbirds follows the exploits of International Rescue, an organisation that uses technologically advanced rescue vehicles to save human life. The main characters are ex-astronaut Jeff Tracy, founder of International Rescue, and his five adult sons, who pilot the organisation's main vehicles: the Thunderbird machines. In "The Cham-Cham", USAF transport aircraft are being shot down during radio broadcasts by popular band the Cass Carnaby Five. International Rescue suspects sabotage, and Lady Penelope, Tin-Tin and Parker go to the Swiss Alps to investigate the band's latest tour venue, Paradise Peaks mountain resort. There, they discover that the aircraft attacks are being co-ordinated with the aid of an advanced computer called a "Cham-Cham".

Filmed in late 1965, "The Cham-Cham" has a show business theme and was written in the style of classic Hollywood musicals. It features several innovations in APF's use of marionette puppets. One scene features the Penelope character performing a slow dance, which was a challenge to film due to the difficulty in moving Supermarionation puppets convincingly. "The Cham-Cham" is also the first episode of any Supermarionation series to show characters skiing. "Dangerous Game", the focus of the episode's soundtrack, was devised as a Latin rhythm by series composer Barry Gray. Singer Ken Barrie recorded a lyrical version but this is not heard in the finished episode.

"The Cham-Cham" has been well received by commentators, drawing particular praise for its production design and soundtrack. Sylvia Anderson considered the plot "far-fetched" but valued the episode for its "charm" and Swiss Alps setting. An audio adaptation of the episode, narrated by David Graham as Parker, was released in March 1967 as the Century 21 mini-LP Lady Penelope.

== Plot ==
Three United States Air Force RTL2 transporters, each carrying a shipment of missiles, have been shot down by enemy fighters shortly after take-off from Matthews Field base. On Tracy Island, Alan notes that each attack occurred while popular band the Cass Carnaby Five were performing their hit instrumental "Dangerous Game" on live radio. He and Brains examine a recording of the latest broadcast to determine whether the music contains a hidden code being used to coordinate the attacks.

Meanwhile, Jeff assigns Lady Penelope and Tin-Tin to investigate Paradise Peaks, a mountaintop hotel in the Swiss Alps that is currently playing host to Cass Carnaby and his group. The agents go undercover, with Penelope posing as a singer called "Wanda Lamour" and Parker securing a job as a waiter. They learn that Carnaby's manager, the mysterious Mr Olsen, often alters the arrangement of "Dangerous Game" before each new broadcast and that he is expecting to receive a message the following day.

Penelope and Tin-tin ski down the mountain to Olsen's chalet and film him operating a strange machine that is decoding musical sounds into text stating the time of the next missile shipment. They deduce that he is issuing orders for the next attack and start back to Paradise Peaks to alert Jeff. Realising that he has been observed, Olsen telephones his associate Banino, a waiter at the hotel, with orders to kill Penelope and Tin-Tin. Banino goes outside with a sniper rifle and prepares to shoot the women before they reach the hotel. However, he is thwarted by Parker, who overheard the phone conversation and grabs the rifle, upsetting Banino's aim. In their struggle, the men lose their balance and tumble down the mountain together, forming a giant snowball in the process. Banino is knocked out but Parker emerges unscathed.

On Tracy Island, Brains identifies Olsen's machine as a Cham-Cham, an ultrasonically-sensitive computer that Olsen is using to send coded radio transmissions. Jeff relays this information to Washington, D.C., but the gruff Matthews Field commander, believing it to be a hoax, refuses to postpone the next shipment. The Cass Carnaby Five begin performing Olsen's latest arrangement of "Dangerous Game". The shipment seems doomed until Penelope, in the guise of Wanda Lamour, appears on stage and sings a lyrical version, devised by Brains, containing a new set of coded instructions. Decoding the broadcast, the personnel at the enemy air base unwittingly direct their fighters to overfly Matthews Field. Arriving in Thunderbird 1, Scott alerts the commander and fighters are launched to shoot down the hostiles.

Fearing Olsen's retribution, Jeff dispatches Virgil and Alan to Paradise Peaks in Thunderbird 2 to bring Penelope, Tin-Tin and Parker home. As the trio leave the hotel in a cable car, Olsen cuts the lines behind them, causing the car to speed out of control down the mountain. Thunderbird 2's magnetic grabs cannot get a purchase on the car, so Virgil and Alan release a set of guide cables. Climbing onto the roof, Parker hooks the cables with the handle of Penelope's umbrella and attaches them to the car. Virgil and Alan fire Thunderbird 2's retro-rockets, bringing the car to a halt but also throwing Parker off the roof. He uses the umbrella to parachute safely to the ground. Penelope, Tin-Tin, Parker and the Tracys return to Paradise Peaks, where Cass treats them to a private piano recital of "Dangerous Game".

== Regular voice cast ==
- Sylvia Anderson as Lady Penelope
- Ray Barrett as John Tracy
- Peter Dyneley as Jeff Tracy
- Christine Finn as Tin-Tin Kyrano and Grandma Tracy
- David Graham as Brains and Parker
- David Holliday as Virgil Tracy
- Shane Rimmer as Scott Tracy
- Matt Zimmerman as Alan Tracy

== Production ==
Filmed in November and December 1965, "The Cham-Cham" was the second-to-last episode of Thunderbirds Series One to be produced. Scriptwriter Alan Pattillo created its show business plot and the exotic setting of Paradise Peaks in an attempt to emulate classic Hollywood musicals. Penelope's alias, Wanda Lamour, was named after the actress and singer Dorothy Lamour and Wanda Webb, one of APF's puppet operators.

APF had always found it difficult to make its puppets walk convincingly, so rarely showed this action openly on-screen. Instead, the puppet operators created an illusion of walking by holding the puppets' legs (which were kept out of shot) and moving the puppets up and down using a "bobbing" action. For the scene in "The Cham-Cham" where Penelope glides across the Paradise Peaks ballroom while singing "Dangerous Game", Webb worked the puppet from the stage while fellow operator Christine Glanville controlled its wired top portion from an overhead gantry.

Gerry Anderson believed that Penelope and Tin-Tin's trip to Olsen's lodge looked suitably realistic, despite APF never having shown puppets skiing prior to this episode. Anderson himself conceived the "ski thrusters" used by the characters to ascend the mountain during their journey back to Paradise Peaks, in part to remove the need for the puppets to walk. Praising Bob Bell's production design, Anderson commented that the episode "gave [APF's] art and design departments a chance to show what they could really do, and they didn't let us down."

Composer Barry Gray devised "Dangerous Game" as a Latin rhythm. Originally all performances by the Cass Carnaby Five were to have been a lyrical version sung by Ken Barrie, but for the finished episode this was replaced with a variety of instrumental versions. Sylvia Anderson based her singing voice on that of Marlene Dietrich. The shots of Penelope and Tin-Tin skiing to Olsen's chalet are accompanied by an incidental track called "Happy Flying" that was originally composed for the Supercar episode "Amazonian Adventure".

As with "Attack of the Alligators!", which had been filmed immediately prior, the technical complexity of "The Cham-Cham" caused production to finish behind schedule and considerably over-budget. To make up for the lost time and extra costs, the scriptwriters turned the final episode of Series One into a clip show. That episode, "Security Hazard", made extensive use of flashbacks to earlier instalments to reduce the amount of new footage that needed to be filmed.

== Reception ==
We tried to do things in that picture that we hadn't done before, such as Penelope dancing a slow foxtrot. It was an experimental production, but was great fun to do.

— Alan Pattillo (2000)

Sylvia Anderson considered "The Cham-Cham" one of the series' best episodes and a rival to "Attack of the Alligators!" in terms of quality. On her website, she commented: "Even though the plot is far-fetched, it has charm and, because of the lovely Swiss mountain setting, has credibility."

Gerry Anderson biographers Simon Archer and Marcus Hearn describe "The Cham-Cham" as "perhaps the most lavish-looking episode of the series", calling the scenes of Penelope and Tin-Tin skiing and Penelope singing "unforgettable images". Hearn, in his book Thunderbirds: The Vault, calls the episode one of Thunderbirds' "most entertaining" due to its focus on Penelope and Parker as well as its use of "one of the most exotic locations in the series". Tom Fox of Starburst magazine rates the episode 4 out of 5, describing the plot as "tenuous" but believing this to be redeemed by the production design and the scenes of the cable car rescue. Like Archer and Hearn, he is entertained by Parker's umbrella descent.

Ian Fryer considers the premise to be inspired by the first episode of The Sentimental Agent, "All That Jazz" (1963), in which a band are found to be sending information to spies. He praises the "confidence" of "The Cham-Cham", calling it a "triumph" for art director Bob Bell and writing that although the story has "occasional moments of silliness", "everything about the production works perfectly." He believes that the episode is proof of Supermarionation's ability to "present glamour convincingly on-screen" and represents the "absolute pinnacle of what [the Andersons] achieved with puppetry". According to commentator Alistair McGown, the story was influenced by Road to... comedy films and the spy series The Avengers. He writes that while the plot "may be flimsy in places", the overall episode is a "gorgeous confection" with the skiing and dancing sequences paying "impressive attention to detail". Both McGown and Hearn call the skiing scenes "charming".

Stephen La Rivière praises the episode's technical standards, remarking that the skiing and dancing sequences "[fly] in the face of what puppets can and can't do." He sums up "The Cham-Cham" as a "glorious example of Thunderbirds at its best, combining all the elements that made the show so popular: the characters, the adventure, the rescues and, of course, the humour." He further argues that the humour has intergenerational appeal, stating that Parker's double entendres are counterbalanced by overt slapstick moments such as the character's "Mary Poppins"-style descent using Penelope's umbrella. Richard Farrell considers the episode to be "largely played for laughs", noting Parker tumbling down the piste in a giant snowball. He praises the "impressive attention to detail" when Penelope dances with Olsen and the scene of Penelope and Tin-Tin skiing to Olsen's chalet. Marcus Hearn praises the significant roles given to Penelope and Tin-Tin as well as the various sets, including the skiing scene, calling it the "most inventive use yet" of Derek Meddings' roller-road technique.

In a review of the CD release of the Thunderbirds soundtrack, Morag Reavley of BBC Online describes Sylvia Anderson's singing as "slinky, sexy and slightly off-key, like a hung-over Zsa Zsa Gabor". Heather Phares of AllMusic considers "Dangerous Game" to be a highlight of the release, commenting that while the instrumental version "[reflects] the Sixties' ongoing fascination with exotica and Latin pop", its lyrical counterpart "could be a kissing cousin to seductive spy themes like 'Goldfinger'." McGown calls Anderson's conscious imitation of Marlene Dietrich her "campest moment" voicing Penelope.

Media historian Nicholas J. Cull interprets "The Cham-Cham" as a piece of Cold War-inspired fiction, noting the "Central/Eastern European accents" of the enemy airbase personnel.
