= Mary Turner (puppeteer) =

British former puppetry supervisor, sculptor, and director on TV shows

Mary Turner (b. 1933) is a British former puppetry supervisor, sculptor, and director on TV shows including Thunderbirds, The Adventures of Rupert Bear, and Captain Scarlet and the Mysterons. She worked on several shows for AP Films and sculpted the original puppet heads for several of their characters, including Lady Penelope and Captain Scarlet.

== Early life ==
Turner became interested in puppetry after her mother, who was also an artist, brought home a marionette from a puppetry class at a local polytechnic. Turner studied sculpture at art college and spent two years as a teacher.

== AP Films ==
Turner came to work for AP Films, later called 21 Century Productions, as a puppet operator on a show called Torchy the Battery Boy (1959). She began to sculpt character heads for the company's shows starting with Four Feather Falls (1960). The team initially worked in the ballroom of a house in Maidenhead before the production company moved to new premises in Slough. She worked on Fireball XL5 (1962) and Stingray (1965).

For Thunderbirds (1965), Turner sculpted the head for Lady Penelope based on Sylvia Anderson’s instructions. After Sylvia rejected several prototypes, Turner produced a model based on Sylvia's appearance. Turner and her assistant, Judith Shutt, also sculpted Gordon Tracy, John Tracy and Brains. As well as sculpting, Turner developed a mechanism that would allow the puppets' heads to turn and tilt.

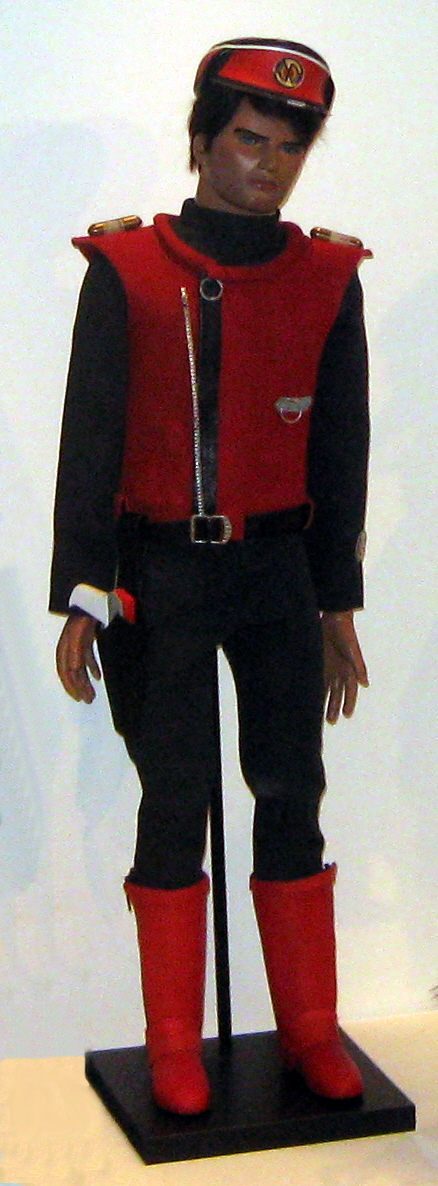
Captain Scarlet

Turner supervised puppetry for Thunderbirds. She and her colleagues operated the puppets from an eight-foot-high puppetry bridge. Director David Elliott said of her, ‘Mary was the puppeteer. Anything you wanted, no matter how awkward, and boom—it was done.’ Stephen La Riviere also said, ‘Mary has the magic touch to make it look like no effort at all…Mary is this country’s most successful puppet talent.’

Turner continued to make and operate puppets for the company's shows, including Captain Scarlet and the Mysterons. She created a puppet based on comedian Stanley Unwin to serve as the main character of The Secret Service (1969). When the company closed down in 1969, Turner took home several puppets, including Lady Penelope, Gordon Tracy, and Captain Scarlet.

== Later work ==
After the closure of 21 Century Films, Turner worked on The Adventures of Rupert Bear (1970), Here Comes Mumfie (1975), Cloppa Castle (1978), which Turner directed, and The Munch Bunch (1980). She also briefly worked on Labyrinth (1986), puppeting some of the goblins.

She returned to work on The Anniversary Episodes for Thunderbirds in 2015.
