= The Man from MI.5 =

- Thunderbirds episode
- Episode no.: Series 1 Episode 20
- Directed by: David Lane
- Written by: Alan Fennell
- Cinematography by: Julien Lugrin
- Editing by: Harry MacDonald
- Production code: 20
- Original air date: 20 January 1966

Guest character voices
- Sylvia Anderson as a Fireflash hostess; Ray Barrett as Bondson and Ritter; David Graham as Carl and Tidman; Matt Zimmerman as the 3rd gangster

Episode chronology
← Previous "The Impostors"	Next → "Cry Wolf"

"The Man from MI.5" is an episode of Thunderbirds, a British Supermarionation television series created by Gerry and Sylvia Anderson and filmed by their production company AP Films (APF) for ITC Entertainment. Written by Alan Fennell and directed by David Lane, it was first broadcast on 20 January 1966 on ATV Midlands as the 17th episode of Series One. It is the 20th episode in the official running order.

Set in the 2060s, Thunderbirds follows the missions of International Rescue, a secret organisation that uses technologically advanced rescue vehicles to save human life. The lead characters are ex-astronaut Jeff Tracy, founder of International Rescue, and his five adult sons, who pilot the organisation's primary vehicles: the Thunderbird machines. In "The Man from MI.5", International Rescue field operative Lady Penelope is assigned to help British secret agent Bondson recover stolen plans for a nuclear device. Commentators view the episode, which has been received positively, as a homage to the James Bond films, especially in its guest character Bondson, who was based on Sean Connery's performance as the title character.

The episode had its first UK-wide network broadcast on 24 January 1992 on BBC2. The same year, a comic strip adaptation, written by Fennell and drawn by Jon Haward, was serialised in issues 24 to 26 of Fleetway's Thunderbirds: The Comic. Bondson had previously made a guest appearance in issue 44 of APF's Lady Penelope comic in 1966.

== Plot ==
On the French Riviera, British Secret Service agent Bondson and his associate Tidman prepare to rendezvous with Captain Blacker aboard his yacht to take possession of secret papers. They are unaware these have been stolen by a frogman, Carl, who has shot Blacker dead and planted a limpet mine on the yacht's hull. As Carl makes his escape, the bomb explodes and sinks the yacht. Diving down to the wreck, Bondson finds Blacker's body and determines that the papers have been stolen.

Bondson contacts International Rescue, so Jeff Tracy assigns Lady Penelope to the case. After flying to the south of France with Parker, Penelope anonymously contacts Bondson to arrange a meeting. Following him to the forest of Digne and pressing a gun behind him so that he cannot see her face, she probes him for information. Bondson, who considers International Rescue ideally placed to help due to its advanced technology, explains that the plans of a nuclear device have been stolen.

From aboard her yacht FAB 2, Penelope decides to set herself up as a target for the killers, posing as model Gayle Williams; she has a newspaper print an article about her determination to expose those behind Blacker's murder. She then gives Parker the night off, and he goes ashore to hit a Monte Carlo casino. Carl, who has read about "Williams" in the news and intends to kill her, takes a boat out to FAB 2 and abducts Penelope to an empty boathouse. He tells her that a bomb will be detonated remotely from the gang's hideout just as a patrol is due to pass the boathouse, distracting the authorities while the gang start the submarine and get away with the papers.

On the pretence of reapplying her makeup, Penelope activates her compact's concealed videophone and uses sign language to warn Tracy Island of the situation. Before she can give details, Carl impatiently knocks the compact to the floor, ties Penelope to a chair, arms the bomb and departs, but with great effort Penelope manages to tip the chair over and verbally relay Carl's plan into the compact's microphone. Jeff immediately dispatches Scott in Thunderbird 1 and Virgil and Gordon in Thunderbird 2 to rescue Penelope and stop the gang. Scott uses Thunderbird 1's sonar sounding equipment to locate the sub. Virgil deploys Thunderbird 2's pod, from which Gordon launches Thunderbird 4. Reaching the submarine just before the gang can detonate the bomb, Gordon drills through the hull and floods the cabin with knockout gas, incapacitating Carl and his cronies. As the police patrol passes the boathouse without incident, Scott frees Penelope while Gordon retrieves the papers. After Penelope returns the papers to Bondson, she learns from Parker that he got carried away at the casino and gambled away her yacht.

== Regular voice cast ==
- Sylvia Anderson as Lady Penelope
- Ray Barrett as John Tracy
- Peter Dyneley as Jeff Tracy
- Christine Finn as Tin-Tin Kyrano
- David Graham as Gordon Tracy, Brains and Parker
- David Holliday as Virgil Tracy
- Shane Rimmer as Scott Tracy
- Matt Zimmerman as Alan Tracy

== Production ==
"The Man from MI.5" was filmed in late 1965. Series composer Barry Gray recorded the episode's incidental music on 4 December 1965 with a 5-member band.

The model shots of the French coast incorporated a large background painting by special effects assistant Mike Trim, which later appeared in "The Duchess Assignment" as well as episodes of Captain Scarlet and the Mysterons and Joe 90. The puppet sets representing FAB 2's interior previously appeared in the Stingray episode "Star of the East". The prop newspaper from which Carl learns about "Gayle Williams" was a mock-up of France-Soir, a real French newspaper.

Carl's shooting of Blacker involved a human hand, placed next to the camera, firing a prop gun at a puppet stationed at the back of the set. This was one of several scenes in Thunderbirds which used a subjective camera angle and forced perspective to realistically present live hands and the series' scale (1/3-lifesized) puppets in the same shot.

== Reception ==
Giving the episode three out of five stars, Tom Fox of Starburst magazine writes that in Bondson and other aspects, "The Man from MI.5" is "as obvious in its attempts at homage as it is clunky". However, he adds that it contains "a few enjoyable little moments amongst the strained stereotypes". Sylvia Anderson found the episode dated by the scenes featuring the compact videophone. Mike Jones questions Bondson's presence on the French Riviera given that MI5's role is domestic counterespionage rather than foreign intelligence. Marcus Hearn and Alistair McGown believe the episode's title to be a play on The Man from U.N.C.L.E.

Hearn regards "The Man from MI.5" as an entertaining episode as well as Thunderbirds' "most brazen" tribute to the Bond series, surpassing "30 Minutes After Noon". Pointing out that "The Man from MI.5" was made shortly before the release of Thunderball, in which Bond tracks down a pair of atomic bombs stolen from a sunken military aircraft, McGown suggests that the episode's underwater action may have been influenced by the plot of the film. He also believes that the dark-haired Bondson was deliberately modelled on Bond actor Sean Connery. Hearn notes that despite the similarities, there is no indication that the Bond producers ever objected to the episode, whereas they threatened the makers of the Carry On films with legal action when elements of the Bond series were parodied in Carry On Spying (1964). McGown, who suggests that Bondson's role was minimised to avoid legal troubles, regrets that the character amounts to little more than a "cameo joke", pointing out that he does not work alongside Penelope or even meet her face to face. Praising the "playful humour", McGown states that while the episode's foray into spy thriller territory is an unusual story, the change of tone "hardly matters" as the episode is "such great fun". However, he argues that Penelope's apparent lack of an escape plan makes little sense.

Hearn and Nicholas J. Cull argue that "The Man from MI.5" exemplifies a preoccupation with nuclear dangers recurrent throughout the series. Hearn writes that the episode is among several in which the world comes "perilously close" to nuclear disaster, also stating that this presentation of nuclear issues "betrays the era of its production". According to Cull, both "The Man from MI.5" and other APF productions show how "nuclear weapons and wider nuclear fears in general are much part of the world of Gerry Anderson." He adds that through Bondson, "The Man from MI.5" is one of a number that "unashamedly capitalised on the Cold War cult of the secret agent whose skills defend the home from enemies unknown."

"The Man from MI.5" has received praise for its incidental music, which Fox considers to be of the "suave and slinky Sixties spy" variety. A BBC review of the series soundtrack characterises the episode's music as "the spy theme James Bond never had – an urbane jazz fantasia, perfect for a mannequin about town". Making a similar connection to Bond, Hearn argues that the music is "more Henry Mancini than John Barry".
