= Give or Take a Million =

- Thunderbirds episode
- Episode no.: Series 2 Episode 6
- Directed by: Desmond Saunders
- Written by: Alan Pattillo
- Cinematography by: Julien Lugrin
- Editing by: Harry Macdonald
- Production code: 32
- Original air date: 25 December 1966

Guest character voices
- Sylvia Anderson as; Nicky Nurse Nimmo: Ray Barrett as; Scobie Harman Security Chief Joe: Peter Dyneley as; Security Guard Preston: David Graham as; Straker Leo (2nd Harman's Santa): Charles Tingwell (uncredited) as; Dr Lang Tanner (Harman's toy packer): Jeremy Wilkin as; Dr Pringle Saunders 1st Harman's Santa TV Reporter

Episode chronology
← Previous "Ricochet"	Next → —

"Give or Take a Million" is the 32nd and final episode of Thunderbirds, a British Supermarionation television series created by Gerry and Sylvia Anderson and filmed by their production company AP Films for ITC Entertainment. Written by Alan Pattillo and directed by Desmond Saunders, it was first broadcast on 25 December 1966 on ATV London and Anglia Television as the sixth and final episode of Series Two. It had its first UK-wide network broadcast on 20 December 1991 on BBC2.

Set in the 2060s, Thunderbirds follows the missions of International Rescue, a secret organisation that uses technologically advanced rescue vehicles to save human life. The lead characters are ex-astronaut Jeff Tracy, founder of International Rescue, and his five adult sons, who pilot the organisation's primary vehicles: the Thunderbird machines. In the Christmas-themed "Give or Take a Million", a pair of bank robbers become embroiled in preparations for a hospital fundraiser in which International Rescue is to play a special role.

== Plot ==
On Tracy Island, Christmas has arrived and the area surrounding the Tracy villa is miraculously covered in snow. As well as Lady Penelope, International Rescue are hosting a special guest for the holiday – a young boy called Nicky. Jeff, dressed as Santa Claus, recalls the events that led up to this day.

At Coralville Children's Hospital, which is looking for ways to raise money to build a new solar therapy wing. In collaboration with rocket manufacturer Saunders Automations and Harman's department store of New York, the hospital board devises a Christmas publicity stunt to benefit all involved: a Saunders rocket, loaded with Harman's toys and launched from the store's roof, which will overfly Coralville and parachute-drop its cargo into the hospital car park – thus providing a Christmas present for every Coralville child. Instead of a toy, one of the children will win a very special prize: Christmas Day on Tracy Island.

On Christmas Eve, shortly before the rocket launch, criminals Scobie and Straker break into the deserted Harman's. Using drills to remove a portion of wall, they penetrate the property next door – the high-security vault of the Second National Bank – and set about stealing $10 million in gold bullion. To avoid touching the vault's alarmed floor, they shoot a cable into the opposite wall and use it like a Tyrolean traverse, Straker holding the line taut while Scobie, suspended from a harness, loads the gold into a sack. As they prepare to escape with their loot, they accidentally knock a pencil to the floor, setting off the alarm. To evade security guards, they lock themselves in what turns out to be the rocket's cargo compartment, which is being transferred to the launch pad in a freight elevator. By the time Scobie and Straker's pursuers realise where they have hidden, it is too late to stop the launch, and the rocket blasts off with the robbers trapped inside. After the rocket drops its cargo over Coralville, the hospital staff open the compartment to find Scobie and Straker amid the gold and boxes of presents, having been knocked out by the g-forces. The hospital hands the robbers and gold over to the police and receives enough reward money to fund its new wing. Having flown out in Thunderbird 2, Virgil collects Nicky, the prize winner, and flies him to Tracy Island to spend Christmas with International Rescue.

In the episode's subplot, festive preparations on Tracy Island are under way when Brains hears Virgil expressing regret that the chances of a white Christmas in the South Pacific are extremely low. Brains has an idea and secretly builds a machine in the roof of the Tracy villa. In the closing scene, set after Nicky's arrival, Brains asks everyone to shut their eyes and then activates the machine: a snow-making system. Opening their eyes, Nicky and the International Rescue team are delighted to find the villa and its surroundings under a blanket of snow.

== Regular voice cast ==
- Sylvia Anderson as Lady Penelope
- Ray Barrett as John Tracy
- Peter Dyneley as Jeff Tracy
- Christine Finn as Tin-Tin Kyrano and Grandma Tracy
- David Graham as Gordon Tracy, Brains and Kyrano
- Shane Rimmer as Scott Tracy
- Jeremy Wilkin as Virgil Tracy
- Matt Zimmerman as Alan Tracy

== Production ==
Although a wall calendar on Tracy Island indicates that it is December 2026, the series producers intended "Give or Take a Million" to be set in December 2067, consistent with earlier episodes taking place in 2065. The year 2067 fits with the fact that a day-of-the-week desktop calendar, also depicted in the episode, showed four consecutive dates, the last of which was Saturday the 24th, which is technically correct for the year 2067 as well as for 1966, the year the episode was filmed. The calendar shots, as well as moments in other episodes that point to different settings, were dismissed by Gerry Anderson and art director Bob Bell as production design errors.

In the opening scene, Jeff and Nicky, the latter playing with miniature toys of the Thunderbird machines, watch a demonstration launch of Thunderbird 3, which Nicky has requested for his Christmas wish. The launch sequence was not the stock footage used in earlier episodes, but a newer version recycled from the feature film Thunderbirds Are Go, which was released the same month "Give or Take a Million" first aired. Nicky's toys were actual Thunderbirds merchandise produced by company J. Rosenthal (Toys) Ltd.

The scale model towers used in the exterior shots of Harman's Department Store were originally made for a scene in Thunderbirds Are Go that was later deleted from the film. The guest character Saunders was named after the episode's director, Desmond Saunders.

== Reception ==
Tom Fox of Starburst magazine rates "Give or Take a Million" two out of five, calling the story "flabby" and overly sentimental. Sean Bassett of Screen Rant praises the episode for its "especially charming" plot and "endearingly sweet moments".

Alan Barnes and Marcus Hearn both point out that the series finale is the only episode in which International Rescue do not perform any rescues. Barnes compares "Give or Take a Million" to the Stingray episode "A Christmas to Remember", which sees the main characters of that series hosting an orphan boy for Christmas. Hearn writes that "Give or Take a Million" shows how Thunderbirds "was successfully experimenting with its format right until the end", describing the episode as a "whimsical entry". He considers the bank robbery scenes suspensefully directed and calls the snowfall ending a "suitably sentimental farewell".

Commenting on the closing scene, Ian Haywood writes that the artificial snowfall created by Brains reflects the status of Tracy Island as "a perfect 'false self', a brilliantly simulated natural paradise" from which true nature has been exiled. He interprets this banishment as part of a broader conflict, evident in several episodes, between "masculine" science and "maternal" nature, equating the absence of nature to the Tracy brothers' lack of a mother figure.

In her 1991 autobiography, Sylvia Anderson wrote that Alan Pattillo "provides the human touch for" the Tracy family readying for Christmas.
