= The Uninvited (Thunderbirds) =

- Thunderbirds episode
- Episode no.: Series 1 Episode 5
- Directed by: Desmond Saunders
- Written by: Alan Fennell
- Cinematography by: Julien Lugrin
- Editing by: Peter Elliott
- Production code: 5
- Original air date: 2 December 1965

Guest character voices
- Ray Barrett as Wilson and a Zombite guard; David Graham as the Zombite leader and the squadron leader; Matt Zimmerman as Lindsey and the Zombite missile controller

Episode chronology
← Previous "Sun Probe"	Next → "The Mighty Atom"

"The Uninvited" is an episode of Thunderbirds, a British 1960s Supermarionation television series created by Gerry and Sylvia Anderson and filmed by their production company AP Films (APF) for ITC Entertainment. Written by Alan Fennell and directed by Desmond Saunders, it was first broadcast on ATV Midlands on 2 December 1965 as the tenth episode of Series One. It is the fifth episode in the official running order.

Set in the 2060s, the series follows the exploits of International Rescue, an organisation that uses technologically advanced rescue vehicles to save human life. The main characters are ex-astronaut Jeff Tracy, founder of International Rescue, and his five adult sons, who pilot the organisation's main vehicles: the Thunderbird machines. "The Uninvited" begins with Thunderbird 1 being shot down by unidentified fighters in the Sahara. Pilot Scott Tracy is rescued by two archaeologists, who later need International Rescue's help when they become entombed in the Pyramid of Khamandides – home of the hostile tribe that shot down Scott.

In 1992, a comic strip adaptation of "The Uninvited" was published in Fleetway's Thunderbirds: The Comic and the comics album Thunderbirds: Shock Wave. Also that year, the episode was novelised by Dave Morris for Young Corgi Books. In 2004, "The Uninvited" was included on the A&E DVD The Best of Thunderbirds – The Favorite Episodes.

== Plot ==
Scott Tracy is flying back to Tracy Island in Thunderbird 1 when he is suddenly attacked by a trio of unidentified fighters. Thunderbird 1 is damaged and crash-lands in the Sahara sand dunes. Jeff dispatches Virgil, Brains and Tin-Tin in Thunderbird 2 to rescue Scott. In the desert, Scott is found by archaeologists Wilson and Lindsey in their all-terrain truck and supply trailer; they administer first aid to Scott and radio International Rescue to give coordinates to Thunderbird 2. With Scott convalescent and Thunderbird 1 repaired by Brains, Wilson and Lindsey explain that they are searching for the legendary lost pyramid of Khamandides.

The next day, the International Rescue group return to Tracy Island, as Wilson and Lindsey continue their search, but frustration gets the better of Wilson. He drives the jeep too fast, causing their supplies trailer to break lose; it overturns, slides down a sand dune and explodes, destroying all of the men's food, water and fuel and damaging their radio. They use the truck's remaining fuel to travel to a nearby oasis but discover that it has long since dried up. As a last, desperate resort, the men use the failing radio to send out a SOS call to International Rescue. Alan Tracy is relieving John as space monitor on Thunderbird 5 when they pick up Wilson and Lindsey's distress call. Jeff dispatches Scott in Thunderbird 1 to find and rescue the men.

In the desert, Lindsey spots the lost pyramid of Khamandides. They drive to the pyramid. As Lindsey deciphers hieroglyphs on the side – hailing Khamandides as "God of the Eternal Fountain" – a block rises up to form an entrance to the interior. The men enter but find themselves entombed when the block closes. Deeper inside, they discover the Eternal Fountain and drink from it. They also find mounds of treasure.

Scott arrives at the pyramid and enters through the one-way door that opens and shuts again. Lindsey, heat and dehydration toll taken on him, cracks, and believes Scott has come to steal the treasure and a gun battle ensures between Lindsey and Scott. Scott loses his gun but is saved by the arrival of two armed men, bearing the same insignia as the fighter planes that shot down Thunderbird 1, who blast Lindsey's gun out of his hand, stunning him. The strangers take Scott, Wilson and the unconscious Lindsey deeper into the pyramid via monorail car. This journey takes them over a refinery where one man in a gas mask are using a highly toxic and explosive gas to refuel fighters identical to those that shot down Scott. They arrive in a control room where a leader is commanding.

Virgil and Gordon set out in Thunderbird 2 to investigate the pyramid. Seeing Thunderbird 2's arrival, the pyramid's inhabitants prepare to fire ground-to-air missiles at it, but Scott and Wilson attack the guards and in a shootout, Scott fires a bullet at a control panel, causing the missiles to launch but detonate harmlessly in mid-air. Scott and Wilson take the monorail back to the entrance, with Scott shooting at the refinery worker as they go; the; the shootout accidentally detonates gas produced by an industrial plant beneath the pyramid, starting a series of explosions. Scott, Wilson and Lindsey, who has just regained consciousness, emerge from the pyramid entrance and Scott radios Virgil to warm him to get clear. Scott and the explorers escape in Thunderbird 1, just before the pyramid finally explodes in a huge fireball. Thunderbird 1 and Thunderbird 2 depart.

== Regular voice cast ==
- Ray Barrett as John Tracy
- Peter Dyneley as Jeff Tracy
- Christine Finn as Tin-Tin Kyrano and Grandma Tracy
- David Graham as Gordon Tracy and Brains
- David Holliday as Virgil Tracy
- Shane Rimmer as Scott Tracy
- Matt Zimmerman as Alan Tracy

== Production ==
"The Uninvited" was the fifth episode of Thunderbirds to be produced. Its working title was "Desert of Danger". Originally filmed in late 1964 as a 25-minute episode, it was extended to 50 minutes in January 1965 to satisfy APF's owner Lew Grade, who had been highly impressed with the pilot episode and ordered all episodes be expanded to fill an hour-long TV timeslot. The additional material for "The Uninvited" consisted of the shoot-down of Thunderbird 1, the rescue of Scott and the character's subsequent recovery on Tracy Island. The filming of these new scenes coincided with the production of "Desperate Intruder" and "30 Minutes After Noon".

Although the pyramid dwellers are never named on screen, the script identified them as the "Zombites". Their aircraft were re-dressed versions of the WASP fighters from Stingray. The model vehicle representing Wilson and Lindsey's desert truck would later appear in "The Mighty Atom", "Martian Invasion" and "Cry Wolf". The shots of Alan launching in Thunderbird 3 to relieve John were recycled from "Sun Probe".

Actor Matt Zimmerman, who voiced Lindsey, fondly remembered the dialogue recording for this episode: "I had to yell and scream, 'Hahaha! You won't take me alive, Tracy!' We had a lot of fun doing that one." The episode marks the first appearance of Grandma Tracy in the series.

== Broadcast and reception ==
First broadcast on 2 December 1965, "The Uninvited" was transmitted as the tenth episode of Thunderbirds for both the series' original run on Associated Television and the majority of 1960s repeat runs. A number of scenes were omitted from the two-part version that was shown in some UK regions.

=== Reception ===
Series co-creator Sylvia Anderson described "The Uninvited" as "good fun but a little too adventurous for our puppet cast", though she praised the episode's special effects.

Tom Fox of Starburst magazine gives "The Uninvited" a rating of five out of five, calling it a "quality episode". He praises the setting as well as the Zombites, whom he describes as "hilarious" and "hardly your average bunch of pyramid-dwelling undead".

Writing for Panini UK, Chris Bentley also comments positively on the episode, stating that it "entertainingly re-shapes the series' format, illustrating the potentially wide variety of stories that can be told within the International Rescue framework." He also commends the episode's use of action.

Marcus Hearn, author of Thunderbirds: The Vault, has mixed views on the episode. He describes the final battle with the Zombites as being "staged in the explosive style of the 1960s James Bond films" but questions Lindsey's fit of homicidal rage against Scott, believing it to be "out of character". Hearn also criticises the Zombites as villains, noting that their hostility and motives for living underground are never explained. He suggests that the plot concerning the quest for a lost pyramid would not have looked out of place in an episode of Stingray.

Anderson commentator Fred McNamara praises the attack on Thunderbird 1 noting that it shows that "I.R themselves aren't infallible allow a grounded sense of drama and empathy for the jeopardy International Rescue throws itself into". He also praises the conflicting characters of Lindsey and Wilson. He notes that Fennell seemed to regret the lack of depth to the Zombites which lead to new dialogue and scenes for them to feature in the comic adaptation, as well having the Zombites evacuate to the pyramid's underground bunkers, safe from the explosion.
