= Vault of Death (Thunderbirds) =

- Thunderbirds episode
- Episode no.: Series 1 Episode 7
- Directed by: David Elliott
- Written by: Dennis Spooner
- Cinematography by: Julien Lugrin
- Editing by: Peter Elliott
- Production code: 7
- Original air date: 23 December 1965

Guest character voices
- Sylvia Anderson as Lil; Ray Barrett as Lovegrove; Peter Dyneley as Lord Silton and Longman; David Graham as Lambert, Light-Fingered Fred, Police Officer, Taylor, Moore, and Barrett; Shane Rimmer as Carter

Episode chronology
← Previous "The Mighty Atom"	Next → "Operation Crash-Dive"

"Vault of Death" is an episode of Thunderbirds, a British Supermarionation television series created by Gerry and Sylvia Anderson and filmed by their production company AP Films (APF; later Century 21 Productions) for ITC Entertainment. Written by Dennis Spooner and directed by David Elliott, it was first broadcast on 23 December 1965 on ATV Midlands as the 13th episode of Series One. It is the seventh episode in the official running order.

Set in the 2060s, Thunderbirds follows the missions of International Rescue, a secret organisation which uses technologically advanced rescue vehicles to save human life. The lead characters are ex‑astronaut Jeff Tracy, founder of International Rescue, and his five adult sons, who pilot the organisation's primary vehicles: the Thunderbird machines. In "Vault of Death", International Rescue are called upon to save a Bank of England employee who is trapped inside a maximum-security vault which is slowly being drained of air. As field agent Lady Penelope attempts to get the bank's chairman and key holder to London, their arrival is delayed by Penelope's chauffeur, Parker, who thinks his former cellmate is attempting to break into the bank's vault.

In 1967, Century 21 released an audio adaptation on vinyl EP record (Lady Penelope and Parker, catalogue number MA 118), narrated by Penelope's voice actor, Sylvia Anderson. "Vault of Death" had its first UK‑wide network transmission on 1 November 1991 on BBC2.

== Plot ==
To test the Bank of England's vault, Lady Penelope and Parker are challenged to break into it. Using only a stethoscope, Parker, a former convict and expert safe-cracker, unlocks the door in less than three hours. Bank president Lord Silton's case for a new strongroom is proven, leading the bank to install a modern vault with an electronic door – to which Silton has the only key. When the door is closed, the air inside the vault is pumped out to vacuum-preserve the contents. After sealing the vault, Silton leaves London to dine with Penelope at Creighton-Ward Mansion. It is soon discovered that a workaholic accountant called Lambert is locked in the vault and running out of air. Knowing that only Silton can unlock the door, bank manager Lovegrove transmits an emergency signal to his briefcase.

At the mansion, Parker reads in the newspaper that his old cellmate, professional thief "Light‑Fingered Fred", has escaped from Parkmoor Scrubs Prison. When Silton receives Lovegrove's signal, Penelope asks if the bank is being robbed, startling Parker and causing him to spill coffee all over Silton's trousers. Parker then sabotages Penelope's videophone to stop Silton calling Lovegrove and finding out the trouble. Penelope orders Parker to take them to London in FAB 1, but Parker deliberately prolongs the journey – driving slowly, taking wrong turns, then stopping the car and claiming to be lost. Penelope demands an explanation for his behaviour. Parker reveals that when he and Fred were in prison, Fred said that he was determined to rob the Bank of England at the earliest opportunity. Now that Fred has escaped, Parker is reluctant to go to London in case he ends up foiling his friend's plan. Penelope takes the wheel of FAB 1 but proves to be a terrible driver, narrowly avoiding an accident before leaving the road and cutting across country.

With no sign of Silton, Lovegrove radios International Rescue for help. John Tracy relays the details from the Thunderbird 5 space station to Tracy Island, and Jeff dispatches Scott in Thunderbird 1 followed by Virgil and Alan in Thunderbird 2. Arriving in London, the brothers establish that due to the city's network of underground power lines, they cannot use The Mole to tunnel into the vault. Their cutting torches fail to penetrate the door, so Scott calls base for ideas on how to reach Lambert. Grandma suggests gaining access from below via the abandoned London Underground.

As Lambert, gasping for air, finally discovers that he is locked in, Virgil and Alan enter Bank Station and plant explosives on a wall backing directly onto the vault. Penelope, Parker and Silton reach the bank with a minute to spare, only for Silton to realise that he left his key at Penelope's. As Virgil and Alan blast through the wall, Parker uses one of Penelope's hairpins to open the door in a matter of seconds. Virgil and Alan lead the breathless Lambert away. Appalled that the new vault has been defeated so easily, Silton and Lovegrove agree to reinstate the old one.

As they drive home, Penelope asks Parker why it took so long for him to get into the old safe, but moments to get into the new one; Parker replies that he did not want to disappoint his audience. Meanwhile, Fred breaks into the vault, amused to find that Parker and the Tracys have beaten him to it.

== Regular voice cast ==
- Ray Barrett as John Tracy
- Peter Dyneley as Jeff Tracy
- Christine Finn as Tin-Tin Kyrano and Grandma Tracy
- David Graham as Brains and Parker
- David Holliday as Virgil Tracy
- Shane Rimmer as Scott Tracy
- Matt Zimmerman as Alan Tracy

== Production ==
The seventh episode to be produced, "Vault of Death" sees the reintroduction of Lady Penelope and Parker following their brief appearance in the first episode, "Trapped in the Sky", and is the characters' first centric episode. According to Chris Bentley, the episode presents the duo more as comic relief than competent undercover agents.

"Vault of Death" is one of several early Thunderbirds episodes that were extended from 25 to 50 minutes after Lew Grade – APF's owner, who had been highly impressed by the 25‑minute version of "Trapped in the Sky" – ordered the runtime doubled so the series would fill an hour-long TV timeslot. Material not present in the original version includes the staged bank robbery at the start of the episode; some of the scenes set at Creighton-Ward Mansion; shots of the two Thunderbirds parked at a heliport in the City of London; Parker telling Penelope about him and Fred, including a flashback to their time in prison; and Grandma describing the London Underground. Silton was originally called Sefton and various other scenes were omitted.

Penelope and Parker's night-time raid on the old vault – which sees the characters chloroforming a policeman guarding the bank, then using plastic explosive to blow open the front door before making their way to the vault anteroom – combined puppet footage with close-ups of live actors. Judith Shutt, one of the series' puppet operators, served as Penelope's arm and eye double for shots of the character peering through a keyhole and later snapping her fingers.

The scale model representing the London heliport tower was partly adapted from a model that had appeared as Marineville Tower in the previous APF series, Stingray. In one of the bank scenes, an employee is first heard speaking with a voice provided by Shane Rimmer, only for this to change to David Graham in a later shot. The voice of Lovegrove, supplied by Ray Barrett, was an impression of John Gielgud. The episode's incidental music was performed by a group of 24 musicians and recorded on 8 October 1965.

== Reception ==
Tom Fox of Starburst magazine rates the episode three out of five, calling it a bizarre and humorous instalment.

According to Marcus Hearn, the episode's comedy peaks with the scene of Penelope's dangerous driving. Hearn believes that "Vault of Death" playfully highlights American misconceptions about the British while making a serious statement about the pitfalls of technological progress: the penetration of a hi-tech vault with conventional explosive and improvised lock-pick symbolises "experience and ingenuity [triumphing] over supposedly state-of-the-art equipment." He considers this an example of Thunderbirds' "underlying pessimism" about advancements in technology.

Chris Bentley, author of The Complete Book of Thunderbirds, writes that the episode presents Penelope and Parker as "comedy characters, rather than the effective agents" they are usually portrayed as.
