= Desmond Saunders =

British television director and film editor (1926–2018)

- Saunders, c. 2014
- Born: 24 June 1926
- Died: 21 April 2018 (aged 91)
- Occupations: Film editor; television director
- Notable work: Supercar; Thunderbirds; Captain Scarlet; Joe 90

Desmond "Des" Saunders (24 June 1926 – 21 April 2018) was a British television director and film editor.

He had a long association with producer Gerry Anderson, having served as a director for the series Supercar (1961–62), Stingray (1964–65), Thunderbirds (1965–66), Captain Scarlet and the Mysterons (1967–68), Joe 90 (1968–69) and Terrahawks (1983–86). Saunders was also production controller for Joe 90 and co-wrote one of the episodes, "Lone-Handed 90". He briefly worked as a production supervisor for The Secret Service (1969).

Elsewhere in television, Saunders had both production and post-production roles for The Protectors (1972–73).

His film editing credits are: Rx for Murder (1958), A Woman's Temptation (1959), Escort for Hire (1960), Compelled (1960), Tarnished Heroes and So Evil, So Young (both 1961) and Voyage of the Damned (1976). He was sound editor for Floods of Fear (1959).

While working on puppet series for Anderson, the A.P. Films team received constant requests to make the puppets more real. Once, Saunders chose all of the male puppets and put little penises on them. When the girls came in during the morning, there was, as Saunders describes, "the most terrible uproar". In response, he said: "Well, you know, you gotta bring them to life somehow, haven't you?".

He died on 21 April 2018 at the age of 91.
