= Nicholas J. Cull =

British historian and writer

- Born: 1964 (age 61–62)
- Citizenship: British
- Education: University of Leeds; Princeton University (Harkness Fellow)
- Occupations: Public diplomacy professor Cultural and media historian
- Writing career
- Language: English
- Period: 1995–present
- Subjects: Propaganda theory Mass media history Cold War
- Notable works: Selling War (1995); The Cold War and the United States Information Agency: American Propaganda and Public Diplomacy, 1945–1989 (2008)

Nicholas J. Cull (born 1964) is a historian and professor in the Master's in Public Diplomacy program at the Annenberg School for Communication and Journalism at the University of Southern California. He was the founding director of this program and ran it from 2005 to 2019.

== Career ==
Cull earned both his B.A. and Ph.D. at the University of Leeds. As a graduate, he studied at Princeton University as a Harkness Fellow of the Commonwealth Fund of New York. From 1992 to 1997, he was lecturer in American history at the University of Birmingham, and from 1997 to 2005, chair in American studies and director of the Centre for American Studies at the University of Leicester.

Cull's research and teaching interests are broad and inter-disciplinary, and focus on public diplomacy, the role of advocacy, culture, exchange, broadcasting, and public opinion research in foreign policy. Cull has also worked more broadly on the history of propaganda, film, television and radio history and the role of mass media as a source for historical study. He is best known for detailed historical studies of the institutions behind public diplomacy and for emphasizing the importance of "listening" as a pre-condition for successful public diplomacy. He coined the term reputational security for a category of enhanced security that comes to an international actor when they are well thought of by external audiences.

Cull is past president of the International Association for Media and History (2004-2019), and has worked closely with the British Council's Counterpoint Think Tank. He sits on the board of the Public Diplomacy Council and is a Fellow of the Royal Historical Society. In April 2008, Cull's University of Southern California program was a co-winner of the Benjamin Franklin Award for Public Diplomacy, awarded by the U.S. Department of State. In January 2012, he succeeded Simon Anholt as editor of the Journal of Place Branding and Public Diplomacy (published by Palgrave) and continued in this role until January 2019. He has been featured in a number of documentary films including Memory: The Origins of Alien (2019).

He has held visiting appointments at Università Cattolica del Sacro Cuore, Milano's Rome program and at Green Templeton College/Reuters Institute for the Study of Journalism, University of Oxford.

== Publications ==
Both Cull's first book, Selling War (Oxford University Press, 1995), and The Cold War and the United States Information Agency: American Propaganda and Public Diplomacy, 1945–1989 (Cambridge University Press, 2008) were recognized by Choice: Current Reviews for Academic Libraries as outstanding academic publications of the year.

Cull is the co-editor of Propaganda and Mass Persuasion: A Historical Encyclopedia, 1500–present (2003), which was one of Book List magazine's official reference books of the year, and Alambrista and the U.S.-Mexico Border: Film, Music, and Stories of Undocumented Immigrants (2004; with David L. Carrasco).

With James Chapman, he has co-authored Projecting Empire: Imperialism and Popular Cinema (I.B. Tauris, 2009) and Projecting Tomorrow: Science Fiction and Popular Cinema (I.B. Tauris, 2013).

His most recent single authored works are Public Diplomacy: Foundations for Global Engagement in the Digital Age (Polity, 2019) and Reputational Security: Refocusing Public Diplomacy for a Dangerous World (Polity, 2024) His most recent edited works are with Nancy Snow Routledge Handbook of Public Diplomacy, 2nd edition (Routledge, 2020) and Michael Hawes Canada's Public Diplomacy (Palgrave, 2020).
