= Tracy family =

- First appearance: "Trapped in the Sky"; Thunderbirds; 30 September 1965
- Last appearance: "The Long Reach – Part 2"; Thunderbirds Are Go; 22 February 2020
- Created by: Gerry & Sylvia Anderson

The Tracy family are the main characters in the 1960s British Supermarionation television series Thunderbirds and its adaptations, set in the 21st century.

Originating from the United States, the family live on Tracy Island in the South Pacific Ocean. Headed by Jeff, an industrialist and philanthropist, the Tracys run International Rescue, a search-and-rescue organisation operating on land and sea, in air and in space. They carry out their missions using a range of technologically advanced vehicles and equipment headed by a fleet of five craft called the Thunderbird machines, piloted by Jeff's sons.

== First and second generations ==
Jeff and Grandma Tracy in the original Thunderbirds

=== Grandma Tracy ===
Grandma Tracy
- First appearance: "The Uninvited" (2 December 1965)
- Voiced by: Christine Finn (1960s); Sandra Dickinson (2015–2020)

In-universe information
- Occupation: Housekeeper and cook
- Spouse: Grant
- Origin: Kansas

Grandma is the mother of Jeff and paternal grandmother of Scott, John, Virgil, Gordon and Alan. The character was originally voiced by Christine Finn and the puppet was sculpted by either John Blundall or Carolyn Turner.

Grandma's chronology is unclear in that she does not move to Tracy Island until "Move – and You're Dead" (production number 9), despite being mentioned in "Sun Probe" (production number 4) and appearing in all four episodes filmed in between. In the original broadcast order, Grandma appears in even more episodes prior to "Move – and You're Dead". While the character was intended to debut in that episode, she was written into the preceding episodes after the series' runtime was doubled to 50 minutes by order of Lew Grade, forcing the writers to devise additional scenes and subplots to extend the episodes that had already been filmed.

==== Original depiction ====
Little is known about Grandma's past, and her real name is never mentioned on screen. The other characters, including her son Jeff, call her "Grandma". As a girl, she travelled on the London Underground with her own grandmother, a fact that would later prove useful for International Rescue ("Vault of Death"). She was married to a Kansas wheat farmer but was widowed some time before the founding of International Rescue. She helped Jeff bring up his five sons after the death of his wife. During International Rescue's early days she lived alone near San Miguel, somewhere in the Western United States. However, she began to miss feeling useful, so decided to move to Tracy Island.

After winning the Parola Sands Race, her youngest grandson Alan picks her up so she can move to Tracy Island. A racing competitor of Alan's takes revenge and Alan and Grandma find themselves having to stay motionless on a bridge spanning the San Miguel River due to a bomb that their enemy has placed under it – should either of them move, the bomb will detonate and the bridge will be destroyed. They are rescued by Alan's brothers. ("Move – and You're Dead"). Grandma then moves into the Tracy household.

As the family matriarch, Grandma keeps the Tracys together, offering wisdom and advice for them and others in the household, such as Alan's love Tin-Tin. It is Grandma who keeps Alan and Tin-Tin together when Tin-Tin's ex-boyfriend pays a visit ("End of the Road"). Along with Kyrano and Tin-Tin, Grandma takes care of domestic chores in the Tracy household, though she can sometimes be confused by technology – at one point mixing tracking bugs into a pie ("Day of Disaster"), but later being able to work a nuclear oven ("Give or Take a Million").

Though not an active member of International Rescue, Grandma still plays a role when needed. She helps her grandsons organise equipment that they need ("Sun Probe") and it is she who comes up with a solution for a rescue at the Bank of England when everyone else is out of ideas ("Vault of Death"). She also attends the filming of an edition of the Ned Cook Show in which the host thanks International Rescue for saving his life ("Terror in New York City"). Grandma has never visited a stately home but hopes to do so one day, especially after meeting Lady Penelope ("The Mighty Atom").

==== In adaptations ====
Grandma briefly appears in the film Thunderbird 6 but has no dialogue. She is absent from the 2004 live-action film.

Grandma returns in the remake Thunderbirds Are Go, voiced by Sandra Dickinson. In the remake, she has a different personality: she has taken over the role of head of the family following Jeff's disappearance, is tougher than the puppet version, and is a poor cook. In series 2, her first name is revealed to be Sally. Carolyn Percy of the Wales Arts Review comments that the remake character's "loving but no-nonsense" personality is in contrast with the original puppet character, who was played as more of a "stereotypical sweet little old lady".

=== Jeff Tracy ===
Jeff Tracy
- First appearance: "Trapped in the Sky" (30 September 1965)
- Designed by: John Brown (sculptor)
- Portrayed by: Bill Paxton (2004)
- Voiced by: Peter Dyneley (1960s); Lee Majors (2020); Jon Culshaw (2021)

In-universe information
- Occupation: Leader of International Rescue; Business executive; Colonel, USAF; Former astronaut
- Spouse: Lucille
- Home: Tracy Island

Jeff is the leader of International Rescue and father of Scott, John, Virgil, Gordon and Alan. The character was originally voiced by Peter Dyneley.

The son of a combine harvester driver on a Kansas wheat farm, Jeff joined the United States Air Force and reached the rank of colonel. Later, he transferred to the Space Agency to become an early lunar astronaut. He married Lucille, with whom he had five sons: Scott, John, Virgil, Gordon and Alan. Each was named after one of the Project Mercury astronauts: Scott Carpenter, John Glenn, Virgil Grissom, Gordon Cooper and Alan Shepard.

According to a 1993 tie-in comic strip, Lucille and Jeff's father, Grant Tracy, were both killed in an avalanche. In the 2008 novel by Joan Marie Verba, Lucy died after an avalanche swept her van off a cliff.

Jeff founded a civil engineering, construction and aerospace business that made him one of the wealthiest men in the world. He later became a philanthropist and founded International Rescue. As the family patriarch, Jeff spends most of his time on Tracy Island, remotely coordinating rescue missions.

==== In adaptations ====
Bill Paxton, who played the live-action version of Jeff, described the character as "a kind of teacher, this father figure who has to teach his sons, particularly his youngest son Alan, these basic lessons of ethics and integrity, about doing the right thing."

In the remake Thunderbirds Are Go, Jeff vanished six years prior to the start of the series, for which the Hood is shown to be responsible ("Ring of Fire – Part 2"). Scott, as the eldest of the brothers, appears to have assumed command of International Rescue in his father's place. The origins of International Rescue are gradually explained throughout the series. Originally, Jeff was the only member with one ship: the TV-21, an ultra-high-speed rocket that according to Brains' was faster than any of the Thunderbirds. Following the loss of the TV-21, the Thunderbirds were built.

Jeff finally appears in series 3, initially in recordings in the two-part episode "Signals", which reveals that he was last seen trying to stop the Hood stealing the Zero-X spacecraft. When the Hood's actions nearly caused Zero-X's engine to overload, potentially creating an extinction-level event, Jeff took the ship into space. There was an explosion and both Jeff and Zero-X were believed lost. However, at the end of the episode "SOS", Brains discovers that rescued robot Braman was not sending a distress call, but was actually acting as a relay to send the message to Earth, and finds a coded message within the distress call that could only have come from Jeff. After recovering the Hood's escape pod, Brains realises that the explosion was a shockwave created by the ship's faster-than-light 'T' drive engine, which propelled Jeff into a distant region of space known as the Oort Cloud.

Working with former adversary The Mechanic, Brains builds the Zero-XL, a ship powered by the same engine as the Zero-X and capable of transporting all the Thunderbirds, allowing the Tracy brothers to follow the signal back to its source within a planetoid. At the end of "The Long Reach – Part 1", Scott, while trying to make his way back to Thunderbird 1 after investigating the cave of the planetoid where the signal originated, almost falls into the debris of rocks below after the planetoid begins to break apart. He is caught by an unseen figure who is revealed to be Jeff (voiced by Lee Majors). In "The Long Reach – Part 2", the Hood, who was stowed away onboard the Zero-XL attempting to steal it, is defeated and Jeff is reunited with his sons, returning home to Earth.

== Third generation ==
The Tracy brothers in the original Thunderbirds: (left to right) Gordon, Virgil, Scott, Alan and John

All five of Jeff's sons are introduced in the first episode, "Trapped in the Sky", and live with him on Tracy Island when off-duty and not aboard Thunderbird 5.

=== Scott Tracy ===
Scott Tracy
- Designed by: Christine Glanville (sculptor)
- Portrayed by: Philip Winchester (2004)
- Voiced by: Shane Rimmer (1960s); Rasmus Hardiker (2015–2020)

In-universe information
- Occupation: Thunderbird 1 pilot; Thunderbird 3 co-pilot; Former USAF pilot

Scott is Jeff's eldest son. He is the pilot of International Rescue's primary craft, the reconnaissance rocket plane Thunderbird 1. The puppet was voiced by Shane Rimmer and its facial features were based on those of Sean Connery.

Educated at Yale and Oxford Universities, Scott was decorated for valour during his service with the United States Air Force before taking up his duties with International Rescue. As pilot of Thunderbird 1, he is usually first at the danger zone and acts as field commander during rescue operations. He also takes on secondary duties as co-pilot of Thunderbird 3, is an occasional relief occupant on Thunderbird 5, and leads the organisation from Tracy Island when his father is absent.

As the eldest brother, Scott usually assumes a leadership role during operations. Despite the secretive nature of their work, Scott will collaborate with officials from other organisations who request International Rescue's aid. Of the five brothers, it is Scott who keeps a cool head, and who is quick-thinking when the situation calls for it – particularly when he is at the receiving end of a gun or when the security of International Rescue is compromised.

==== In adaptations ====
In the 2004 film, Scott is played by Philip Winchester. According to Alex Pang's Thunderbirds: X-Ray Cross Sections, he is, like the original, the eldest brother at 24 years of age. He is said to have "graduated from Wharton Academy" (the school that Alan attends at the start of the film) with "record grades" that remain unmatched by his brothers, "a fact he constantly reminds them of".

In the remake Thunderbirds Are Go, Scott is voiced by Rasmus Hardiker. He is still the eldest and most experienced brother and is bold and fearless in action. He is also the team leader. However, he also possesses a short temper, as shown whenever a member of his family is put at risk by human error.

=== John Tracy ===
John Tracy
- Portrayed by: Lex Shrapnel (2004)
- Voiced by: Ray Barrett (1965–1966); Keith Alexander (Thunderbird 6); Thomas Brodie-Sangster (2015–2020)

In-universe information
- Occupation: Thunderbird 5 operator; Thunderbird 3 pilot; Astronomer and writer

John is one of Jeff's younger sons. Alternating with Alan, he is both operator of the Thunderbird 5 space station and pilot of the Thunderbird 3 rescue spacecraft. The character was originally voiced by Ray Barrett and the puppet sculpted by Mary Turner.

John is a noted scholar of astronomy, and has authored several popular astronomy textbooks. He is a graduate of Harvard University with a degree in advanced telecommunications. His quiet intellectual nature and interest in astronomy make him the natural choice for the solitary life as the occupant of Thunderbird 5, monitoring for distress calls from around the world. He is seen to be physically involved in a rescue in only one episode, "Danger at Ocean Deep" (although he remarks in that episode that he has already been on a "dozen" rescues). John is known to be patient, kindly and gracious, and possessed of both great intelligence and poise as gifts inherited from his talented mother.

John was originally intended to play a larger role in Thunderbirds. However, Gerry Anderson took a dislike to the character, who ended up appearing less often than planned. He was the first of the brothers to be voice-cast; Barrett was so impressed with the puppet, whose looks were modelled on Adam Faith and Charlton Heston, that he immediately told Sylvia Anderson that he wanted to play the studious young astronaut with the boyish quiff.

==== In adaptations ====
In the 2004 film, John is played by Lex Shrapnel. According to Alex Pang's Thunderbirds: X-Ray Cross Sections, he is 22 years old and a "computer whizz kid". John's tours of duty on Thunderbird 5 last for three weeks at a time, after which has a week's rest and relaxation on Tracy Island. Over the course of the film, John is nearly killed by the Hood, who launches a missile at the space station to lure International Rescue away from Tracy Island.

In the remake Thunderbirds Are Go, John is voiced by Thomas Brodie-Sangster. He is still on Thunderbird 5 but his role is expanded beyond receiving calls for help; he often helps to coordinate rescue missions through long-distance communication. He is now a redhead instead of blond. He is an emotional introvert who enjoys eating bagels, watching TV (his favourite show is Stingray) and stargazing. He is generally a loner and dislikes spending more time on Earth than he has to. He is the sole operator of Thunderbird 5 until the arrival of EOS, an AI program that he designed.

=== Virgil Tracy ===
Virgil Tracy
- Designed by: John Brown (sculptor)
- Portrayed by: Dominic Colenso (2004)
- Voiced by: David Holliday (1965–1966); Jeremy Wilkin (1966–1968); David Menkin (2015–2020)

In-universe information
- Nickname: Virg
- Occupation: Thunderbird 2 pilot Artist and concert pianist

Virgil is one of Jeff's younger sons. He is the pilot of the transporter aircraft Thunderbird 2 and has specialist expertise in demolition, heavy lifting and logistics.

After studying at Denver School of Advanced Technology, Virgil took up his role in International Rescue as pilot of Thunderbird 2. Besides flying the transporter aircraft, he is often called upon to operate the rescue vehicles that it carries. Virgil also occasionally pilots other Thunderbirds: in "Ricochet", he is seen piloting Thunderbird 3 to investigate a communications blackout between Thunderbird 5 and Tracy Island. He is as dedicated to his calling as any of his brothers. In "Terror in New York City", after he is seriously injured when Thunderbird 2 is mistakenly attacked by a warship, his first thoughts on waking are alarm at the fact that his craft is out of service when it could be needed at any moment. When just such an emergency occurs, he has to be ordered back to bed by Jeff. With an off-duty demeanour much less boisterous than that of his brothers, Virgil spends his free time painting and playing the piano.

In series 1, Virgil was voiced by American actor David Holliday. After Holliday returned to the United States, British-Canadian actor Jeremy Wilkin provided the voice in series 2 and the films Thunderbirds Are Go and Thunderbird 6.

Writing for Broadcast magazine, Ross Bentley praised the character: "Virgil was my complete favourite. He remains, in my book, the ultimate role model for any aspiring renaissance man […] He not only painted but he was also an accomplished pianist. Forget Bobby Crush or Mrs Mills (my only points of TV pianistic reference as a child), Virgil was the business." Former England cricket captain Michael Vaughan is nicknamed "Virgil" for his likeness to the character.

==== In adaptations ====
In the 2004 film, Virgil is played by Dominic Colenso. According to Alex Pang's Thunderbirds: X-Ray Cross Sections, he is 20 years old. He is described as a fitness fanatic, taking part in triathlons and other sporting events when not on duty.

In the remake Thunderbirds Are Go, Virgil is voiced by David Menkin. This version of the character is the largest and strongest of the brothers, and is skilled in engineering and mechanics. Calm and level-headed, he is also the peacemaker in the family.

=== Gordon Tracy ===
Gordon Tracy
- Designed by: Mary Turner (sculptor)
- Portrayed by: Ben Torgersen (2004)
- Voiced by: David Graham (1960s); David Menkin (2015–2020)

In-universe information
- Occupation: Thunderbird 4 pilot; Thunderbird 2 co-pilot; Former WASP operative; Former Olympic swimmer

Gordon is one of Jeff's younger sons. He is the pilot of the Thunderbird 4 rescue submersible and co-pilot of Thunderbird 2. The character was originally voiced by David Graham.

Gordon revels in aquatic sports from skin diving to water skiing. He is a highly trained aquanaut, having served in both the Submarine Service and the World Aquanaut Security Patrol (WASP – the organisation featured in Stingray). During his time with the WASP, Gordon captained a bathyscaphe and investigated marine farming methods. An expert oceanographer, he is also the designer of a unique underwater breathing apparatus, which he has modified and improved for use by International Rescue.

Shortly before International Rescue began operations, Gordon was involved in a hydrofoil speedboat crash when his vessel capsized at 400 knots (740 km/h; 460 mph). The craft was destroyed and Gordon spent several months in hospital. He possesses a strength and tenacity that make him a leader and commander. He is one of the world's fastest freestyle swimmers and an Olympic champion in butterfly stroke.

Gordon is the funny one in the family and is sometimes admonished by Jeff for his flippant sense of humour. In "Day of Disaster", when an unknown party ingests Grandma's edible transmitter, Gordon proves his innocence by saying that he would know if he had swallowed a transmitter, to Jeff's annoyance. Gordon's favourite pastimes are playing chess, going fishing and playing the guitar.

==== In adaptations ====
In the 2004 film, Gordon is played by Ben Torgersen. According to Alex Pang's Thunderbirds: X-Ray Cross Sections, he is 18 years old and a recent graduate from Wharton Academy, the school that Alan attends in the film. He is noted to still be training on the Thunderbirds craft, with a year remaining until he is permitted to fly solo.

In the remake Thunderbirds Are Go, Gordon is voiced by David Menkin. As well as Thunderbird 4, he pilots various devices transported by Thunderbird 2, such as the Elevator Cars in the episode "Fireflash". He is again the funny one, and is also described as having a loud voice, dwarfed only by his clothing tastes. His International Rescue uniform comprises a scuba-diving mouthpiece attached to his sash.

=== Alan Tracy ===
Alan Tracy
- Designed by: Christine Glanville (sculptor)
- Portrayed by: Brady Corbet (2004)
- Voiced by: Ray Barrett; ("Trapped in the Sky"): Matt Zimmerman; (1965–1968): Rasmus Hardiker; (2015–2020)

In-universe information
- Occupation: Thunderbird 3 pilot; Thunderbird 5 operator; Former racing driver
- Significant other: Tin-Tin Kyrano

Alan is Jeff's youngest son. Alternating with John, he is both pilot of Thunderbird 3 and operator of Thunderbird 5.

The puppet was sculpted by Christine Glanville with facial features based Robert Reed. In the first episode, the character was voiced by Ray Barrett. Matt Zimmerman was then added to the series' cast and voiced the character for the remainder of his 1960s appearances. Zimmerman had been recommended to the Andersons by David Holliday, the voice of Virgil. In an interview, Zimmerman remembered of his casting: "They were having great difficulty in casting the part of Alan Tracy as they wanted a certain sound for him ...As I walked in [Sylvia Anderson] looked at me and said, 'Don't talk! Oh, my god, you've got those big eyes and the cleft in the chin and the cheek bones, and if you were blond you'd look very much like Alan.' She said, 'Now, sit down. What's your name again?' And I said, 'My name is Matt Zimmerman and I'm from Detroit, Michigan,' and she said, 'That's the voice!' And that's how I got the job." Zimmerman spoke warmly of the character's conception and development, commenting that "Alan was the one character that showed emotion. He used to get upset if he couldn't go on a mission, he got jealous if Tin-Tin talked to another man, and he was a very real character."

==== Original depiction ====
An accomplished sportsman and former racing driver, Alan can at times be bad-tempered and reckless. He studied at Colorado University, where his impetuousness led to trouble with the authorities over the launch (and subsequent crash) of an unsanctioned, self-built rocket. His father took charge of the situation, steering the boy's interest toward more constructive ends, ultimately resulting in Alan's role as pilot of Thunderbird 3. "Move – and You're Dead" shows that Alan is a skilled racing car driver but gave up this career on joining International Rescue. In "Atlantic Inferno", Alan pilots Thunderbird 1 and coordinates a rescue at sea while Scott remains on Tracy Island to fill in for Jeff, who is on holiday. The most romantic of the brothers, Alan is involved with Tin-Tin Kyrano. He is also seen to be attracted to Lady Penelope in "The Perils of Penelope" and Thunderbirds Are Go.

John Peel considers Alan to be evidence of the series' aptitude for strong characterisation, summing up his character as "love-struck and annoying", yet simultaneously "so human". Martin Anderson of Den of Geek describes Alan in less enthusiastic terms; according to Anderson, the character "was unfortunately relegated to the role of designated driver" for the purposes of ferrying supplies from Tracy Island to John on Thunderbird 5. Mark Radcliffe argues that the character is overshadowed by Scott and Virgil, who direct most of the rescue missions: "Poor Alan, despite having a rocket with much cooler fins than [Thunderbird 1], would then be dispatched to sort of see that everything was going OK. Pretty demeaning work for a guy who's been to puppet Colorado University." Jeff's logic in entrusting Thunderbird 3 (the largest moving Thunderbird) to Alan (his youngest son) has also been questioned.

==== In adaptations ====
Alan is the protagonist of the 2004 film, in which the character (played by Brady Corbet) is 14 years old and attends boarding school. Together with Tin-Tin (Vanessa Hudgens) and Brains' son Fermat (Soren Fulton), he defeats the Hood's efforts to kill his father and brothers on Thunderbird 5 and rob the Bank of London. He still has a crush on Tin-Tin. A retrospective on Den of Geek drew parallels between the new Alan and Harry Potter, alluding to a reversal of the story concept "of a boy at home thrust into an adventurous world".

In the remake Thunderbirds Are Go, Alan (voiced by Rasmus Hardiker) is still pilot of Thunderbird 3. Like the 2004 version, he is a teenager and sometimes treated mockingly by his brothers. He occasionally co-pilots Thunderbird 3 with Scott or Kayo Kyrano. Alan's equipment includes an orbital conveyance platform which allows him to make close approaches to objects, such as the Sat-Mine in the episode "Space Race". His immaturity is shown by his love of sleep and constant urge to play computer games on Thunderbird 3 (as shown in "Slingshot"). He matures over the course of the series.

=== Reception ===
Comparing the premises of Thunderbirds and Flipper, Ian Haywood likened the Tracy sons to knights, and the Thunderbirds that they pilot to "steeds": the sons "command the technology, and are commanded in turn by their father, ex-astronaut Jeff Tracy." Haywood also noted Tracys' "luxuriously leisured" off-duty activities, viewing these as the "reward to the sons for risking their lives". Such "pleasures of consumption and acquisition" are absent from Flipper due to the latter's "spartan ruralism".

In a review of the 2004 film on website The Spinning Image, Graeme Clark wrote that Brady Corbet's Alan was the only brother to be given a distinct personality; his siblings, on the other hand, were "totally interchangeable". Mark Steyn, film critic for The Spectator, criticised the "sidelining" of the rest of the Tracys in favour of the "dull" trio of Alan, Tin-Tin and Fermat, calling it a "transparent grab for the Spy Kids audience". He argued that the Tracys had been "reduced to bit players in their own movie", commenting that "all they do for the rest of the movie [is] lie on the floor of a shattered Thunderbird 5, gulping for air. For all you get to see of the Tracy brothers, it might as well be The Osmonds up there."

Reaction to the 2015 versions was mixed. Andrew Billen wrote that the "youthed-down" brothers – whom he likened to Snap, Crackle and Pop – were his "only real reservation" about Thunderbirds Are Go. Wired stated that the brothers' updated appearances and uniforms were "a bit more jarring than we were expecting", and that the series' promotional images made them look "a bit plastic". It suggested waiting for the first episode since animation, "by its very nature [...] tends to look better in motion."

Writing that the original John was the least developed brother because he was disliked by Gerry Anderson, Carolyn Percy of Wales Arts Review noted the "deeper characterisation" of the 2015 version, who had become "something of a breakout character" by being written as a "slightly anti-social loner". Meanwhile, Gordon – another character Percy viewed as less developed in the original – had turned into a "light-hearted joker".
