= Works based on Thunderbirds =

This article primarily discusses screen and audio works of fiction based on Thunderbirds, a British Supermarionation television series created by Gerry and Sylvia Anderson. It also covers imitations and references in other media.

Produced by AP Films (APF) for ITC Entertainment, the series has inspired various adaptations, imitations and parodies since it was first broadcast in 1965. It has been recognised for its enduring popularity, especially in the UK, and is widely regarded as the Andersons' most successful production.

Among other works, Thunderbirds has generated two film sequels, a TV anime and a live-action film adaptation. A remake, Thunderbirds Are Go, made using a combination of computer animation and live action, premiered in 2015 and ran for three seasons. Also in 2015, three new puppet episodes were created to mark the 50th anniversary of the original series.

For a discussion of Thunderbirds tie-ins – including novels and novelisations, comics and games – see Thunderbirds merchandise.

== Audio plays ==
From 1965 to 1967, Century 21 Records released 19 Thunderbirds audio plays on 7-inch, 33 RPM, vinyl EP records (promoted as "mini-albums"). Three of these were original stories; the rest were re-tellings of TV episodes based on those episodes' soundtracks. In 2015, the original stories were adapted for the screen to mark the series' 50th anniversary (see #The Anniversary Episodes).

In April 2021, Big Finish Productions announced the launch of a new series of audiobooks based on the Anderson productions. The first of these, Thunderbirds: Terror from the Stars (an adaptation of the 1966 tie-in novel Thunderbirds by John Theydon) was released in May 2021. A second Thunderbirds story, Peril in Peru (based on the novel Calling Thunderbirds), was released in November 2021. Produced by Anderson Entertainment, the audiobooks feature Jon Culshaw as the voices of Jeff Tracy and Parker with Genevieve Gaunt as Lady Penelope.

== Film sequels and adaptations ==
Thunderbirds' popularity led APF to make two feature film sequels with financial backing by United Artists. The first, Thunderbirds Are Go, premiered on 12 December 1966; the second, Thunderbird 6, and 29 July 1968. Written and produced by the Andersons and directed by David Lane, both were critical and commercial failures. During the early 1980s, several Thunderbirds episodes were combined to create three made-for-TV compilation films. In 2004, a live-action film adaptation, Thunderbirds, was released.

=== Compilation films ===
In the early 1980s, episodes from Thunderbirds and other Anderson productions were re-edited and combined to make a series of compilation films. These were produced by ITC's New York office under the supervision of writer David Hirsch and producer Robert Mandell. Intended for broadcast in two-hour family timeslots, the format was branded "Super Space Theater" and sold to American cable and syndicated TV. Three Thunderbirds compilations – each 90 minutes long and re-edited with new, animated title sequences – were produced: Thunderbirds to the Rescue (a combination of "Trapped in the Sky" and "Operation Crash-Dive"), Thunderbirds in Outer Space ("Sun Probe" and "Ricochet") and Countdown to Disaster ("Terror in New York City" and "Atlantic Inferno"). Although the home video releases of the "Super Space Theater" compilations led to copyright issues that delayed the releases of the original episodes in their uncut forms, the UK versions proved to be a major commercial success for the distributor, Channel 5 Video.

=== Thunderbirds (2004) ===
A live-action film adaptation – Thunderbirds, directed by Jonathan Frakes and produced by StudioCanal, Universal Pictures and Working Title Films – premiered on 24 July 2004. All the Thunderbird machines seen in the film are based on the original designs, albeit with modern refinements. As BMW, the owners of Rolls-Royce, would not allow the production to use its brand, FAB 1 was redesigned as a modified Ford Thunderbird. The plot focuses on Alan Tracy, Tin-Tin and a newcomer – Brains' son, Fermat – who battle the Hood as he plots a gold bullion raid on the Bank of England.

The film was poorly received both critically and commercially, opening in eleventh place at the North American box office, grossing only £1.3 million in the UK on its opening weekend, and drawing a negative response from fans of the TV series. Sylvia Anderson, who was a production consultant, endorsed the adaptation; in her memoirs, she expressed regret over the "negative vibes that were already being circulated before even a foot of film was being shot. But I suppose there was bound to be a backlash from genuinely passionate fans who jealously guarded the Thunderbirds legacy." According to Anderson, John Read, director of photography on the original series, responded positively at a test screening. By contrast, Gerry Anderson denounced the film as "the biggest load of crap I have ever seen in my life" and an "absolute, unmitigated disaster". Like Sylvia, he had been offered a consultant role, but declined after seeing the concepts for the re-imagined Thunderbirds machines; he also declined an offer of £750,000 to attend the premiere. He received no on-screen credit for his role in co-creating the TV series.

Plans for a live-action film had first been announced by ITC Los Angeles in 1993. Originally due to be released in time for Christmas 1995, the film would have been directed by Renny Harlin, with Tom Cruise a possibility for the role of Scott Tracy. Other actors under consideration included Bob Hoskins as Parker and either Patsy Kensit or Joanna Lumley or Emma Thompson as Lady Penelope. Following PolyGram's acquisition of ITC in 1995, its subsidiary Working Title resumed development of the abortive project, with filming rescheduled to begin in August 1998. By 1997, Karey Kirkpatrick had written a script and Peter Hewitt had been hired as director. Kristin Scott Thomas had been cast as Lady Penelope, while Pete Postlethwaite had yet to accept an offer to play Parker. The Baldwin brothers – Alec, Daniel, William and Stephen – had been suggested as Tracy brothers, with Sean Connery a possibility for the role of Jeff Tracy. Non-live action filming techniques were briefly considered, including computer and stop-motion animation. Gerry Anderson was initially offered a consultant role but was dropped from the production after Working Title decided that it already had a large enough creative team working on the project.

A mixture of budgeting concerns, disagreements over the writing and characterisation, and the poor box office response to Lost in Space and The Avengers (both adaptations of other 1960s TV series), caused the production to stall again. In 1998, PolyGram was purchased by Seagram and merged with Universal – a development that Sylvia Anderson, who had endorsed Hewitt's version, thought had a negative effect on the production: "It seemed Seagram ... cared nothing for this 'work in progress' and the whole Thunderbirds saga fell between the cracks." Frakes' version did not enter production until 2003. Anderson believed that the many delays to the live-action film were partly attributable to her and Gerry's divorce: "[Gerry's and my] parting broke up a winning combination … The two creators [of Thunderbirds] were going in different directions – the winning team was no more. How to entrust millions of dollars to only one of the duo? Which one? The name above the title or the character creator?"

== TV adaptations and revivals ==
In the 1970s, the Andersons sold what remained of their intellectual and residual rights to many of the Supermarionation productions, including Thunderbirds. Consequently, neither was able to assert creative control over the various Thunderbirds updatings that appeared in the 1980s and 1990s. Sylvia Anderson proposed continuing the adventures of Lady Penelope and Parker as an American-made spin-off series but remembered that ITC "dismissed [the idea] out of hand." In the early 1980s, Capital Radio DJ Mike Smith started a campaign to revive Thunderbirds.

After Lew Grade left ITC in 1982, the ownership of the company changed hands three times (first to Robert Holmes à Court, then Alan Bond, then ITC New York) before both the company and its catalogue were acquired by PolyGram in 1995. They subsequently passed to Carlton International Media in 1999, and then Granada plc (following a merger with Carlton) between 2003 and 2004. The rights to the Thunderbirds brand currently reside with ITV Studios, the distributor of the 2015 remake.

=== Thunderbirds 2086 ===
The 1982 Japanese anime Kagaku Kyuujo-Tai TechnoVoyager (English: Scientific Rescue Team TechnoVoyager) – exported to English-speaking countries as Thunderbirds 2086 – was based on Thunderbirds but with a stronger emphasis on futuristic technology. In this re-imagining, developed from a concept by Anderson titled Thunderhawks (but without his knowledge or approval), the vastly-expanded International Rescue operates a fleet of 17 Thunderbird machines and is based within a massive arcology. Distributed by ITC under the supervision of Robert Mandell, Thunderbirds 2086 ran to 24 episodes but was cancelled in Japan with six episodes still to air. In the UK, BBC1 broadcast 13 episodes in 1986.

=== US re-edits ===
The "Hack Masters", Tripp and Roxette, of both Amazin'! Adventures and UPN's short-lived Turbocharged Thunderbirds (1994–1995)

Beginning in February 1994, Fox aired Thunderbirds (styled as Thunderbirds USA or Thunderbirds Are Go!) on its Fox Kids programming block. ITC cut 13 episodes down to half of their original length and added new opening titles, synthesised music, and dialogue provided by American actors. The update was designed to capitalise on the success of Mighty Morphin Power Rangers and other popular children's programmes of the 1990s, besides acquainting American audiences with the premise of Thunderbirds before the release of the live-action film (then expected to appear in 1995). The series was not renewed for a second season and, to date, has never been broadcast in the UK.

In December 1994, the series reappeared as Turbocharged Thunderbirds on both Amazin'! Adventures and UPN. Devised as a comedy, this re-edit kept most of the earlier alterations, although some of the episodes were renamed. It also added live-action scenes featuring a pair of Californian teenagers from the year 2096 – Tripp (Travis Wester) and Roxette (Johna Stewart-Bowden), nicknamed the "Hack Masters" – who are pulled into a parallel universe called "Thunder-World". There, they ally themselves with "simulated lifeforms" of International Rescue (the puppet characters) against the evil Atrocimator and his "head-honcho" the Hood (voiced by Tim Curry and Malachi Throne respectively), serving Jeff Tracy (voiced by Efrem Zimbalist, Jr.) from the orbital listening platform Hackmaster Command (Thunderbird 5).

A single season of 13 episodes was broadcast in the US; as with its precursor, Turbocharged Thunderbirds has never been shown in the UK. Cull describes the series as a "grotesque hybrid show", while Archer and Hearn call it "risible". After viewing sample footage, Anderson considered Turbocharged Thunderbirds to be "the most diabolical thing I had ever seen in my life ... absolutely appalling". He held the acting and dialogue and "gaudily painted set" of Hackmaster Command in particularly low regard and threatened legal action against the producers to force the removal of his name from the credits.

=== Revival efforts ===
Prior to the announcement of a remake in 2013, Gerry Anderson tried to revive Thunderbirds several times. In 1976, Anderson and Fred Freiberger devised Inter-Galactic Rescue 4 as a combined updating of Thunderbirds and Supercar, intending to pitch it to NBC. The series would have been in live action and shown the adventures of the variable-configuration land, sea, air and space rescue vehicle of the title, Rescue 4, patrolling the "north-west quadrant of space". Century 21 designers Reg Hill, Brian Johnson and Martin Bower contributed to the concept art, but NBC rejected the 13-episode proposal in favour of rival story ideas.

In 1984, following the completion of Terrahawks, Anderson conceived T-Force. This concept moved International Rescue's base of operations to a giant submarine, reinvented FAB 1 as a custom-built Porsche, and eliminated Brains' stutter and myopia. Although Anderson was unable to secure the funding needed to develop the series, some of its plot devices later appeared in Firestorm (2003), a Japanese anime series based on an idea by Anderson and John Needham.

In 1993, T-Force was revised as G-Force, later named GFI – an abbreviation of Gee Force Intergalactic, the rescue organisation that would have appeared in International Rescue's place. This proposal featured a G-Force space fleet headed by Galaxy, a colossal vessel housing a factory capable of manufacturing vehicles and equipment tailored to the requirements of any rescue mission. Only one episode – "Warming Warning", written by Tony Barwick – was filmed; it used computer animation for the vehicle sequences and cel animation for scenes involving the characters. The latter, which was provided by a Russian studio, was judged to be of poor quality; as remaking this material would have made the series cost-prohibitive, production on GFI was abandoned. According to Anderson, "the studio in Moscow was, in my opinion, ill equipped. After some six months of desperately trying to make this co-production work, I finally had no option but to call it off."

In September 2005, a QuickTime video clip titled Thunderbirds IR was published on online P2P networks. It included a trailer of a proposed Thunderbirds remake to be made by Carlton Television. Created using a mixture of computer animation and live-action puppetry, the clip included footage of a redesigned Thunderbird 1, characters Scott Tracy and the Hood, and the rescue of a falling lighthouse keeper; Scott was shown walking and performing a backflip with the tongue-in-cheek quip "Look, no strings!". Visual effects company The Mill provided the computer animation. Although Anderson endorsed the project after meeting the Carlton staff, production on new series was postponed indefinitely when Carlton merged with Granada plc.

Writing in 2005 following the completion of New Captain Scarlet, Anderson stated that he had been unable to secure the Thunderbirds remake rights from Granada. By July 2008, he was still in negotiations with ITV, but promised a new version of Thunderbirds that would be "updated for the 21st-century audience" and which would, he hoped, be made in CGI. He added, "This is very much a pet ambition of mine, and I am putting everything into what I consider would be ITV's answer to Doctor Who. Although he continued to express his belief that a series would be made eventually and with his involvement, ITV continued to withhold the rights into late 2008 and early 2009.

==== Thunderbirds Are Go ====
In January 2011, Anderson announced a new series of Thunderbirds during an interview with BBC Radio 5 Live. He said that although he was unable to go into details because he had signed a non-disclosure agreement, the production of the series was assured and that it would indeed be made in CGI, with modernised characters and vehicles. In the 15 January edition of The Sun, he said that he had yet to write the first episode but had "fleshed it out" in his mind.

Anderson died in December 2012, leaving the future of the series in doubt. However, in February 2013, ITV confirmed that ITV Studios and Pukeko Pictures were planning to remake Thunderbirds as a series of 30-minute episodes, to be filmed using a combination of computer animation and live-action model sets. The new series, Thunderbirds Are Go, premiered on CITV in April 2015 and ran for three seasons, ending in 2020.

==== The Anniversary Episodes ====
In 2015, to mark the series' 50th anniversary, ITV commissioned Pod 4 Films (now Century 21 Films) to produce a mini-series of new Thunderbirds episodes based on the soundtracks of three of the 1960s audio plays. The project, titled "Thunderbirds 1965", was supported by Sylvia Anderson and the estate of Gerry Anderson. Funding was secured through a successful Kickstarter campaign, started by Pod 4 director Stephen La Rivière, which ultimately raised £218,412 against an initial goal of £75,000.

The production of the mini-series saw the return of some of the original Thunderbirds crew, including director David Elliott. Following a premiere screening at the BFI Southbank in August 2016, the new episodes were released on DVD and Blu-ray Disc exclusively to their Kickstarter backers. Later titled "The Anniversary Episodes", they were added to BritBox in August 2020 alongside all 32 episodes of the original series.

== References, parodies and imitations ==
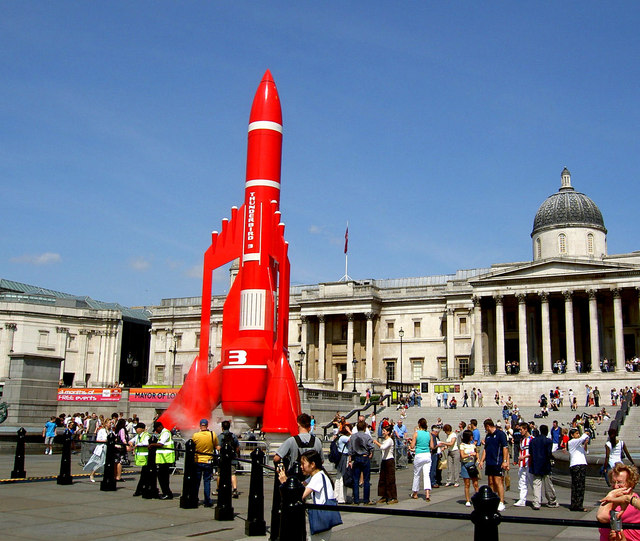
Model Thunderbird 3 on display in Trafalgar Square. Thunderbird 2 models have been shown at the Millennium Dome, Science Museum and other London sites.

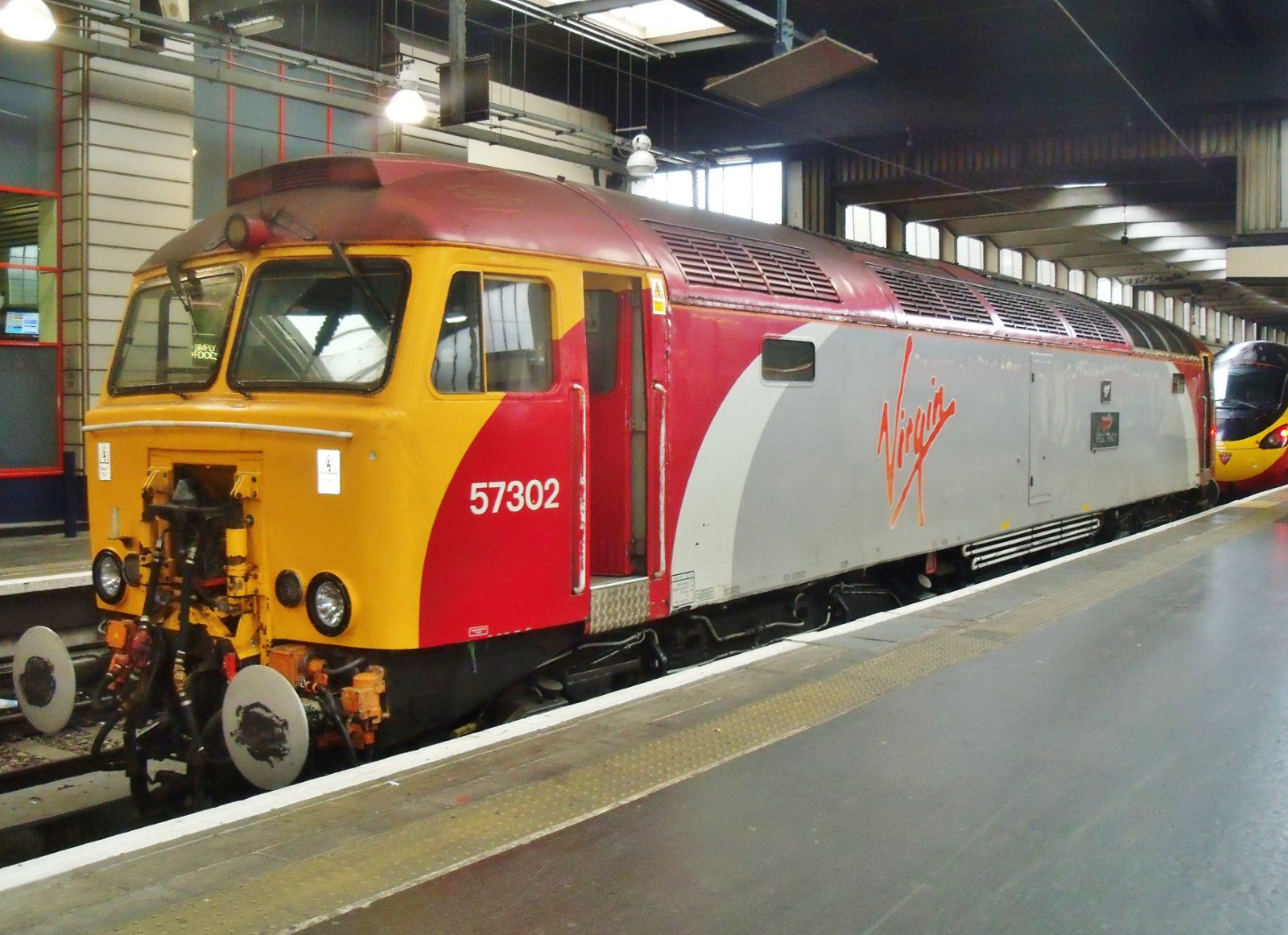
Virgin Trains' 57302 Virgil Tracy

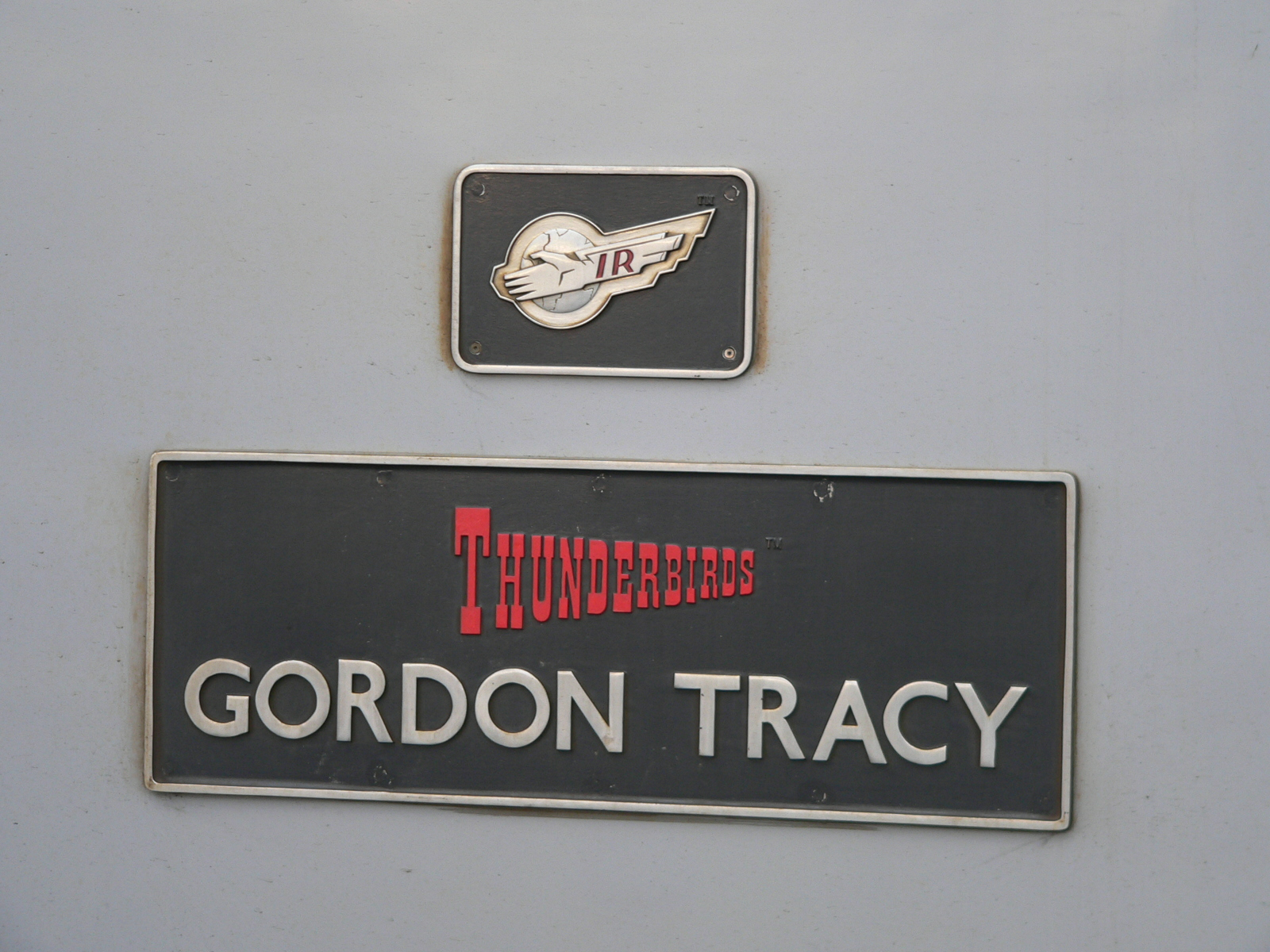
Gordon Tracy name plate on a Virgin Trains 57304

Since it first appeared, Thunderbirds has made a significant impact on popular culture and media worldwide. Anderson's later puppet seriesTerrahawks, about an organisation that defends Earth against hostile androids from Mars, is thematically similar to Thunderbirds but written more as a comedy. International Rescue was the inspiration for the International Rescue Corps, a volunteer rescue organisation started by a group of British firefighters who contributed to the humanitarian effort in the aftermath of the 1980 Irpinia earthquake. The charity made Gerry Anderson its honorary president and has since assisted at disaster zones in various countries.

Peter Jackson has spoken of the series' influence on his career as a film director: "... Thunderbirds was probably the first influence, I guess. I knew it wasn't real. You know, I could even relate to it on a level of it not being real because I had a lot of Matchbox toys and I used to recognise my Matchbox toys in Thunderbirds. You know, I used to be very proud of myself when I'd see, you know, this little truck or lorry sort of trundle by in an episode of Thunderbirds and in my playbox I had exactly the same sort of Matchbox toy. And that sort of was the beginning, really, when I think about it, of, like, the connection of 'This isn't real, these are models, you know, they're making all this stuff up'." The series also influenced the work of comics writer Warren Ellis, including his 2002 series Global Frequency).

Virgin Group has used aspects of the series in its branding. Virgin Atlantic operated a Boeing 747-400 called Lady Penelope, named for its registration: "G-VFAB". Virgin Trains West Coast had a fleet of 16 Class 57 diesel locomotives that it used mainly to rescue broken-down trains; all were named after Thunderbirds characters and vehicles. In the UK, locomotives used for train rescue are often referred to as "Thunderbirds".

In 2003, Image Comics published The Agency, a mini-series set in a parallel world reminiscent of the Supermarionation universe. In this world, the Tomahawks (an organisation similar to International Rescue) operate a VTOL rapid-transit aircraft, an airborne carrier craft, a "sub-atomic warhead" and a space station (corresponding to Thunderbirds 1, 2, 3 and 5). They are associated with Lady Pippa, a former British spy, and her chauffeur Burgess (analogues of Lady Penelope and Parker). The Agency also features pastiches of other Anderson series such as Captain Scarlet and the Mysterons and Joe 90.

In 2011, Royal Mail launched a commemorative stamp range based on the Anderson series; among the items was a mini-sheet of lenticular stamps bearing holograms of Thunderbirds 1, 2, 3 and 4.

=== Film and TV ===
The comedy of the puppet film Team America: World Police (2004), produced by South Park creators Matt Stone and Trey Parker, was inspired by the idiosyncrasies of Thunderbirds-style Supermarionation techniques. In an interview, Stone and Parker stated that while they were not especially fans of Thunderbirds, they thought highly of the series' visual style: "What's made it last is the time and care that the people who did that show put into the marionettes". The 1960s BBC comedy show Not Only... But Also with Peter Cook and Dudley Moore included a regular sketch titled "Superthunderstingcar" – a parody of Thunderbirds and other Anderson series including Supercar and Stingray. The 1980s Australian comedy The D-Generation featured Thunderbirds-themed sketches with live actors imitating wire puppets; storylines included "Thunderbirds Pizza", in which the characters operate a global pizza-delivery business.

The Wallace and Gromit short film A Close Shave (1995) includes an homage to the series: as Wallace prepares to leave his house to go on a window-cleaning job, he moves from his living room to his garage, gets onto his motorcycle, and sets off all with the help of automated machinery, similar to how Virgil Tracy enters and takes off in Thunderbird 2. Further homages can be found in the film Austin Powers: The Spy Who Shagged Me (1999), the TV sitcom Spaced (1999–2001), and the design of the computer-animated characters of TV series Star Wars: The Clone Wars (2008–13). Lady Penelope appears in a 1994 episode of Absolutely Fabulous as part of a dream experienced by Edina Monsoon as she undergoes surgery: Penelope informs Edina that she is dying, but that Brains is working on a chemical formula to save her life. In the United States, MTV broadcast a sitcom parody of Thunderbirds, Super Adventure Team, in 1998.

=== Theatre ===
From 1974 to 1975, the company Stage Three – co-founded by Thunderbirds puppeteer Christine Glanville – hosted a Thunderbirds rod puppet stage show at Bournemouth Pier and other venues.

In 1984, Mime Theatre Project performers Andrew Dawson and Gavin Robertson created a tribute show titled Thunderbirds: F.A.B., which broke box office records when it played at London's Apollo Theatre in 1989. All of the parts were acted by Dawson and Robertson, who "played" the Thunderbirds machines by wearing a range of helmets, each one with a model Thunderbird on top. According to Robertson, the original plan was to wear the models on their shoulders, "but we figured they'd be too small to be seen at the back of the theatre, so we then decided to wear them like huge hats."

Also featuring Captain Scarlet, the show toured internationally and popularised a staccato manner of walking that became known as the "Thunderbirds walk". Gerry Anderson had low expectations for the show, but after seeing Dawson and Robertson's performances called it "original" and "superb". In 1987, Dawson and Robertson's miming style was used in a TV advertisement for Exchange & Mart magazine, which featured Dawson in costume as Scott Tracy. The show returned in 1991 and again in 1995. In 2000, it was relaunched as Thunderbirds: F.A.B. – The Next Generation, with Dawson and Robertson replaced by Wayne Forester and Paul Kent and featuring additional characters from Stingray and Captain Scarlet.

=== Music ===
Cover versions of "The Thunderbirds March" have been released by musicians and bands including Billy Cotton, Joe Loss, Frank Sidebottom, The Rezillos and The Shadows. The Royal Marines Band Service added the theme to its repertoire, performing it at the public unveiling of Concorde in France in 1969. Both the march and Peter Dyneley's introductory "5–4–3–2–1!" countdown have been adopted by Level 42 for use in live concerts, as seen in the video release of their 1987 performance at the old Wembley Stadium in London; an updated version, combined with the opening fanfare to the band's song "Heaven in My Hands", is still used to start their gigs. The countdown has also been used by the Beastie Boys at various events, including the 2007 Live Earth concerts.

Songs inspired by Thunderbirds include "International Rescue" (1989) by Fuzzbox, "Thunderbirds (Your Voice)" (2004) by V6, and "Thunderbirds Are Go!" by Busted (the last of which was the end theme of the 2004 film). In 1998, TISM released the single "Thunderbirds Are Coming Out", the video for which shows a socially awkward teenager who sees the Thunderbird machines on TV and is immediately impressed; thereafter, he is inspired to conform to the norms of adolescent life. Other music videos alluding to Thunderbirds include Wax's "Right Between the Eyes" (1986).

In 1983, Gerry Anderson directed the music video for "SOS", a song performed by Moya Griffiths (the singing voice of Kate Kestrel in Terrahawks) whose lyrics make reference to Thunderbirds characters and vehicles. In 1991, in collaboration with Andrew Dawson, Gavin Robertson and Thunderbirds puppeteer Christine Glanville, Anderson directed the video for the Dire Straits single "Calling Elvis". This blended footage of Thunderbirds-style puppets (some with likenesses of the band members) with scenes from the original TV series and clips of the band in live performance.

In 1990, TV producer Gary Shoefield released a remix album titled Power Themes 90, containing techno covers of themes to various British TV programmes. One of these was Thunderbirds, whose theme was remixed as "Thunderbirds Are Go! (The Pressure Mix)" and billed as "featuring MC Parker". A music video compilation was also released; the segment for "Thunderbirds Are Go! (The Pressure Mix)" contained footage from the TV episodes intercut with specially filmed shots of the original Parker puppet, dressed in "era" clothing and working as a DJ.

=== Advertising ===
From 1965 to 1967, AP Films created a series of themed television adverts for the brands Lyons Maid and Kellogg's, featuring the original voice cast and promoting products including Fab ice lollies and Sugar Smacks breakfast cereal.

In 1990, Gerry Anderson filmed a car insurance advert for Swinton Insurance. Titled "Parker's Day Off", it showed Lady Penelope recklessly driving FAB 1 and having to be rescued by Parker in Thunderbird 2. Parker was played by the puppet, worked by Christine Glanville.

In 1993, an advert for Kit Kat chocolate bars, "Scott Takes a Break", was filmed. This featured the series' "5–4–3–2–1!" countdown and shots of all of the Thunderbirds taking off except Thunderbird 1 – whose pilot, Scott, is shown to be "having a break" with a Kit Kat while off-screen, a frustrated Jeff repeatedly orders him to launch.

In 2001, the Driver and Vehicle Licensing Agency used Thunderbirds in an advert to remind drivers to pay their road tax on time: it showed Lady Penelope snipping Parker's strings for allowing FAB 1 to be clamped. The same year, travel agency Travelcare made an advert featuring the occupants of a swimming pool; the floor of the pool slides away and Thunderbird 1 blasts off, almost incinerating the swimmers and revealing that the location is Tracy Island. The advert had the tagline "We'll tell you what the brochures won't".

In 2008, Specsavers commissioned an advert with Virgil Tracy and the Hood to promote its new "Reaction" varifocal lenses. This featured a jetpack chase between Virgil and the Hood over mountainous terrain. When Virgil emerges from a tunnel into the dazzling sunshine, his "Reaction" lenses immediately darken to protect his vision; the Hood is not so fortunate and, blinded by the light, crashes into a mountain. The advert was filmed in London over five days using techniques similar to those employed by the original crew. Jan King, a member of the crew on Captain Scarlet, returned as puppet operator for the filming of the scene, which used green-screen chroma key compositing to create the mountain background shots. He noted that the advert used ordinary carpet thread for the puppet strings "because [the studio] wanted the strings to be seen, rather than not seen."

Another 2000s advert, released by Britvic to promote its Drench! water, saw Brains dancing to the 1992 song "Rhythm Is a Dancer". He sits down for a swig of Drench! before resuming the dance, and the advert ends with the slogan "Brains perform best when they're hydrated". The official "Stay Drenched!" website hosted a making-of video revealing that Brains' movements were created using a mixture of live-action puppetry, motion capture and computer animation.

In 2017, Penelope and Parker appeared in a Halifax advert promoting the bank's savers' prize draw. In the advert, Parker visits a Halifax branch while running errands for Penelope, and learns that he has won the bank's £500,000 cash prize. Later, at Creighton-Ward Mansion, Penelope rings for Parker, who is nowhere to be found. The scene cuts to reveal that Parker has spent his winnings on a tropical holiday.

=== Video games ===
Thunderbirds inspired the style of Nintendo's Star Fox video game series. Shigeru Miyamoto, the series' creator, has stated that he is a fan of Thunderbirds, and that its distinctive visual style had influenced the puppet-like appearance and actions of the Star Fox characters since Star Fox 64.
