= The Perils of Penelope =

- Thunderbirds episode
- Episode no.: Series 1 Episode 12
- Directed by: Alan Pattillo; Desmond Saunders
- Written by: Alan Pattillo
- Cinematography by: Paddy Seale
- Editing by: Harry Ledger
- Production code: 12
- Original air date: 14 October 1965

Guest character voices
- Ray Barrett as Dr Godber; Peter Dyneley as Sir Jeremy Hodge; David Graham as Professor Borender, Roache, Waiter, Colonel Benson & TV Reporter; Matt Zimmerman as Alfred

Episode chronology
| ← Previous "Brink of Disaster" | Next → "Terror in New York City" |

"The Perils of Penelope" is an episode of Thunderbirds, a British Supermarionation television series created by Gerry and Sylvia Anderson and filmed by their production company AP Films (APF, later Century 21 Productions) for ITC Entertainment. Directed by Alan Pattillo and Desmond Saunders from a script by Pattillo, it was first broadcast on 14 October 1965 on ATV Midlands as the third episode of Series One. It is the 12th episode in the official running order. It was the first episode written specifically for the series newly decreed 50-minute running time.

Set in the 2060s, Thunderbirds follows the missions of International Rescue, a secret organisation which uses technologically advanced rescue vehicles to save human life. The lead characters are ex-astronaut Jeff Tracy, the founder of International Rescue, and his five adult sons, who pilot the organisation's primary fleet of vehicles – the Thunderbird machines. In "The Perils of Penelope", International Rescue field agent Lady Penelope investigates the kidnapping of a scientist: the inventor of a revolutionary fuel which, in the wrong hands, could cause ecological disaster and threaten the political stability of the world.

In 1966, Century 21 released a 21-minute audio adaptation on vinyl EP record (code MA 114) narrated by voice actor David Graham as Parker. "The Perils of Penelope" had its first UK-wide network transmission on 15 November 1991 on BBC2. The episode has been positively received by commentators.

== Plot ==
A new rocket fuel produced from seawater, used to power the "Sun Probe" on its historic solar flight from Cape Kennedy, has been developed by scientist Sir Jeremy Hodge in partnership with his colleague Professor Borender. Two days later, Hodge and Borender attend a conference in Paris, but then Borender disappears from a monorail train during a journey to Anderbad. Hodge calls in Lady Penelope, as he had helped to design the Thunderbird machines. They meet in a Parisian café, where a café patron attempts to poison Penelope by drugging her Pernod but is foiled by Parker, who destroys the Pernod glass with FAB 1's machine gun. The man flees, leaving behind a matchbook emblazoned with a heraldic crest.

Hodge reveals that he suspects that Borender has been kidnapped for the secret formula and warns that in the wrong hands, the fuel could pollute the oceans or even start a world war. Penelope and Hodge go to a heraldic archive to investigate the crest but fail to recognise the archivist as the man from the café, who traps them in a basement as gas is pumped in. Parker tears down the door with FAB 1's grappling lines but again the man escapes.

Retracing Borender's steps, Penelope and Hodge take the express monotrain to Anderbad, unaware that their would-be assassin, Dr Godber, is aboard and has the attendant, Alfred, under his control. When questioned by Penelope and Hodge, Alfred insists that he does not know of any Borender, but Godber, doubting Alfred's loyalty, throws him out of the moving train. Alfred staggers towards a country road but collapses just before Parker, who is following the train, drives past him in FAB 1. As the train approaches the 26-mile (42 km) Anderbad Tunnel, Penelope and Hodge again encounter Godber, who is posing as their new attendant. Penelope secretly films Godber and transmits the images to Parker, who confirms the attendant as the man he saw leaving the archive. As the train enters the tunnel, Godber arranges a power failure to stop the train, then kidnaps Penelope and Hodge at gunpoint.

Before leaving Paris, Penelope contacted Tracy Island to request backup, prompting Jeff to dispatch Virgil, Alan and Gordon to Anderbad in Thunderbird 2. When the train reaches Anderbad and Parker reports Penelope and Hodge missing, Virgil and Gordon set off into the tunnel in the Monobrake to look for them.

Godber takes Penelope and Hodge to his tunnel hideout in a control sub-station where he and his henchman Roache have been keeping Borender captive. Godber has learnt of Borender and Hodge's success and wants the fuel formula for himself. Borender and Hodge refuse to give it, so Godber raises the stakes by tying Penelope to a ladder and lowering it into the path of the next train. Virgil and Gordon discover Godber's hideout and a gunfight ensues. Hodge persuades Roache to halt the train but Godber shoots Roache dead and destroys the control panel. Godber seizes Borender and threatens to throw him in front of the train unless Gordon surrenders, but is distracted when Hodge frees himself, leading to Gordon blasting Godber's gun out of his hand. Virgil shoots the rope holding up the ladder and Penelope falls out of the path of the train just as it comes hurtling through the tunnel.

At night in Paris, Penelope and Hodge relax, while Alan is dismayed that he is too young to go off to the Folies with his brothers, but is cheered up by the arrival of Tin-Tin. Penelope is about to sip Pernod when she is interrupted by another explosion – this time from a firework display, which the group watches.

== Regular voice cast ==
- Sylvia Anderson as Lady Penelope
- Peter Dyneley as Jeff Tracy
- Christine Finn as Tin-Tin Kyrano
- David Graham as Gordon Tracy and Parker
- David Holliday as Virgil Tracy
- Shane Rimmer as Scott Tracy
- Matt Zimmerman as Alan Tracy

== Production ==
Although the episode has no on-screen title, production materials referred to it as "The Perils of Penelope". The title was a homage to the film serial The Perils of Pauline (1914), starring Pearl White as action heroine Pauline Marvin. Alistair McGown describes the episode as a "tongue-in-cheek update" of the serial. In her autobiography, Sylvia Anderson compared Lady Penelope to a Pearl White figure, writing that the scene in which Penelope is tied to a ladder and put in the path of the monorail train "smacked not of sci-fi, but of cracking old adventure".

"The Perils of Penelope" was written at the end of 1964. In December that year, ITC's Lew Grade – APF's owner, who had been highly impressed by the pilot version of the first episode – ordered Gerry Anderson to double the length of every Thunderbirds episode from 25 to 50 minutes so that the series could be given an hour-long timeslot. Instructed by Anderson to think up ways of expanding the story of "The Perils of Penelope", Pattillo completed the script over Christmas. While other episodes needed extensive re-writes and re-shoots to satisfy the longer running time, "The Perils of Penelope" – the 12th episode to enter production – was the first to be both written and filmed in the new 50-minute format. (Note: In his The Complete Book of Thunderbirds, Chris Bentley suggests that like the episodes that were originally filmed as 25 minutes, "The Perils of Penelope" was filmed in two stages, its extending material being shot back-to-back with "Sun Probe". He writes that "The Perils of the Penelope" was the first episode after "Trapped in the Sky" to be completed as 50 minutes (Bentley 2005, p. 27).)

To cut costs and production time, Pattillo's script deliberately re-used a number of plot elements that had already been filmed for other episodes, such as the launch of Sun Probe from the episode of the same name (production number 4) and the scale model effects shots of the Pacific Atlantic monorail train from "Brink of Disaster" (production number 11), here representing the trains to Anderbad. The Sun Probe launch is an extended version of the flashback sequence that begins the earlier episode, with alterations to some of the dialogue and model shots as well as new characters in the form of Hodge and Borender.

The scale model Paris included a street sign for a "Rue Desmonde" – a reference to co-director Desmond Saunders. The prop representing Roache's console was a modification of the Marineville control room console from Stingray. The episode's incidental music was recorded on 18 March 1965 with a 25-member band.

Dialogue in "Sun Probe" indicates that the main part of that episode is set a week after the space launch, so the events of "The Perils of Penelope" must take place only a few days before. Chris Bentley argues that while "The Perils of Penelope" and "Sun Probe" were neither produced nor transmitted consecutively, the episodes may still be regarded as a two-part story. McGown writes that "The Perils of Penelope" is essentially a prequel to "Sun Probe".

== Reception ==
Starburst magazine gave the episode four out of five stars, while DVD Verdict rated it 95 out of 100. Sylvia Anderson liked the episode, characterising it as a "monorail-style" Murder on the Orient Express with "plenty of action and dramatic situations". Noting that "The Perils of Peril" was originally planned for the 25-minute format, Baptiste Marcel of French TV magazine Génération Séries argues that the episode was one of several that did not lend itself well to expansion.

To McGown, "The Perils of Penelope" is an "ambitious" and "glamorous" episode which shows that Thunderbirds was "bigger than the Tracy family and their incredible vehicles". He especially praises Pattillo's "witty" script and the humour it draws from Penelope and Hodge's "Englishness". Marcus Hearn compares Penelope and Hodge to The Avengers' double act of Cathy Gale and John Steed and argues that the scene set at the heraldic archive could have been inspired by the meeting at the College of Arms in the James Bond novel On Her Majesty's Secret Service (1963). Hearn also suggests that one of the cuts in the closing scene, where the shot suddenly switches from Penelope raising her Pernod glass to stock footage of fireworks exploding overhead, would not have been out of place in an Alfred Hitchcock film. In his book 21st Century Visions, Derek Meddings, the special effects director on Thunderbirds, described the episode as "Hitchcock-inspired".
