= Martian Invasion =

- Thunderbirds episode
- A crew member lights a cigarette for an actor playing one of the Martian invaders. The episode has drawn comment for its satire of the film industry and the look of the Martians.
- Episode no.: Series 1 Episode 10
- Directed by: David Elliott
- Written by: Alan Fennell
- Cinematography by: Julien Lugrin
- Editing by: Peter Elliott
- Production code: 10
- Original air date: 17 March 1966

Guest character voices
- Sylvia Anderson as Make-Up Artist; Ray Barrett as Goldheimer, Ray & Brian; Peter Dyneley as Pete; David Graham as Bletcher, "Maguire" & Production Manager; Shane Rimmer as Cinematographer; Matt Zimmerman as General X & "Slim"

Episode chronology
← Previous "Move – and You're Dead"	Next → "Brink of Disaster"

"Martian Invasion" is an episode of Thunderbirds, a British Supermarionation television series created by Gerry and Sylvia Anderson and filmed by their production company AP Films (APF) for Lew Grade's ITC Entertainment. Written by Alan Fennell and directed by David Elliott, it was first broadcast on 17 March 1966 on ATV Midlands as the 24th episode of Series One. It is the tenth episode in the official running order.

Set in the 2060s, Thunderbirds follows the missions of International Rescue, a secret organisation that uses technologically advanced rescue vehicles to save human life. The lead characters are ex-astronaut Jeff Tracy, founder of International Rescue, and his five adult sons, who pilot the organisation's primary vehicles: the Thunderbird machines. In "Martian Invasion", the Hood, a recurring antagonist of International Rescue, arranges an accident during a movie shoot as part of his latest scheme to film the Thunderbird machines in action and sell their technical secrets to a hostile power.

The episode had its first UK-wide network broadcast on 27 March 1992 on BBC2. The same year, it was adapted into a comic strip which was serialised in issues 24 to 26 of Fleetway Publications' Thunderbirds: The Comic.

== Plot ==
Posing as film producer "Mr Stutt", the disguised Hood agrees to finance director Goldheimer's new production: a science-fiction thriller about Martians in flying saucers invading the Earth. This is secretly a front for another of the Hood's schemes to manipulate the Tracys into a rescue operation and obtain the technical secrets of the Thunderbird machines, which he intends to sell to an underworld organisation represented by the mysterious "General X". Using his telepathic powers, the Hood compels his half-brother Kyrano, manservant on Tracy Island, to disable Thunderbird 1's on-board camera detector – a device that alerts International Rescue to attempts to film the Thunderbirds.

Overseen by "Stutt", Goldheimer's production begins shooting in the Nevada desert. As the crew mount a shot of the Martians blowing up the entrance to a cave, trapping two police officers inside, the Hood bribes corrupt producer Bletcher to increase the strength of the explosives. On detonation, what was meant to be a small rockfall turns into a landslide that completely blocks the cave and causes it to flood with groundwater, threatening to drown the actors.

With the crew unable to clear the rock, Goldheimer transmits an emergency call to International Rescue. John Tracy relays the information from Thunderbird 5 to Tracy Island and Jeff immediately dispatches Scott and Virgil in Thunderbirds 1 and 2. Using Thunderbird 2's Excavator pod vehicle, Scott and Virgil bore a hole in the rock to release the groundwater, and the escaping torrent sweeps the actors out of the cave and to safety.

Having recorded the entire rescue operation on one of the film crew's cameras, the Hood departs in a jeep to deliver the footage to General X. When Goldheimer innocently tries to take a photo of the departing Thunderbirds, Scott realises that the camera detector has been sabotaged; seeing "Stutt" making his getaway, he gives chase in Thunderbird 1. Stopping in a mountain tunnel and then doubling back, the Hood loses Scott only to come up against Virgil in Thunderbird 2, who fires the craft's missile gun at a ridge to cause a rockslide blocking the road. Fleeing on foot, the Hood steals a light aircraft from an aerodrome and flies to meet General X. However, the plane is not airworthy and the Hood crashes into the General's villa. The Hood survives but his film is destroyed.

As the film crew resume shooting, Scott and Virgil reflect on events, wondering if "Stutt" was the person who has been hounding International Rescue ever since it began operating. Scott vows that whatever new disguises the enemy may have in store, International Rescue will get him.

== Regular voice cast ==
- Ray Barrett as John Tracy and the Hood
- Peter Dyneley as Jeff Tracy
- Christine Finn as Tin-Tin Kyrano
- David Graham as Gordon Tracy and Kyrano
- David Holliday as Virgil Tracy
- Shane Rimmer as Scott Tracy
- Matt Zimmerman as Alan Tracy

== Production ==
For this episode only, the Hood adopts the alias "Agent Seven-Nine". Although the script names the Hood's employer "General Strond", in the finished episode he is referred to only as "General X". The character is never seen clearly: in one scene, he is shown standing behind a translucent curtain; in other scenes, he is sitting in a high-backed armchair facing away from the camera.

The episode begins with an action sequence from Goldheimer's film: driving through the desert, police officers Slim and Maguire (whose actors are rescued later in the episode) encounter a flying saucer from Mars, whose green-skinned, helmeted occupants use directed-energy weapons to destroy their patrol car; the men flee to a nearby cave, into which the aliens fire projectiles that emit suffocating gas. A final shot of one of the Martians dissolves into a scene of Goldheimer pitching the story to Bletcher and "Mr Stutt", revealing the previous scene to be an embedded narrative. According to Fennell, this story-within-a-story opening was made necessary by Gerry Anderson's wish for Thunderbirds to maintain plausibility within its science fiction genre: "We couldn't have real Martians, so the situation you see at the beginning of the episode turns out to be a film set."

"Martian Invasion" was filmed in Thunderbirds' original 25-minute episode format in January 1965. A few weeks earlier, Lew Grade – who had been greatly impressed by the original 25-minute version of the first episode, "Trapped in the Sky" – had instructed Gerry Anderson to make all episodes 50 minutes long so the series could fill an hour-long commercial TV timeslot. In the case of "Martian Invasion", APF did not have the time to rework the story straight away, and ultimately the episode was expanded and finished only after the completion of the Series One finale, "Security Hazard". The episode's additional material includes a scene in which General X meets the Hood at the latter's temple in Malaysia, the subplot about Kyrano being forced to sabotage Thunderbird 1's camera detector, and an expansion of the chase sequence (in particular, the insertion of the tunnel scenes).

One of the film crew puppets was modelled on Brian Johnson, a member of Thunderbirds' special effects crew.

== Reception ==
Sylvia Anderson described the episode as "another comic-strip action adventure from Alan Fennell" and a "rather elaborate caper".

Rating "Martian Invasion" 5 out of 5, Tom Fox of Starburst magazine praises the episode's "enjoyably silly" plot and "natty" chase scenes, as well as the look of Goldheimer's Martians. He also states that the Hood's plan makes little sense and that his schemes in general become "sillier and sillier. All of [the character's] bizarre aspects are on show here." Cult Times' Mike Fillis considers the Hood's strategy "pedestrian at best" and entertaining only to a child audience.

Chris Bentley and Marcus Hearn discuss the episode as a satire of the film industry, especially in its characters and dialogue. Hearn views the guest cast as caricatures: Bletcher a sleazy movie producer and Goldheimer an ingratiating director who is past his peak. He also notes a humorous exchange between a bored make-up artist and a frustrated actor playing one of the Martians. Hearn compares General X to Ernst Stavro Blofeld, the faceless villain of early James Bond films.

According to Bentley, the episode's weaknesses include its "sparse" plot as well as the "lengthy chase sequence" in its latter half. Hearn comments that International Rescue's pursuit of the Hood offers "little [...] to match the wit and ingenuity of the earlier action", although he considers the Hood's defeat reasonably satisfying.
