= The Hood (Thunderbirds) =

Main villain in Thunderbirds media

- Thunderbirds character
- The original puppet character
- First appearance: "Trapped in the Sky" (30 September 1965)
- Created by: Gerry and Sylvia Anderson
- Designed by: John Brown (puppet sculptor)
- Voiced by: Ray Barrett (original series); Malachi Throne (Turbocharged Thunderbirds)

In-universe information
- Alias: Agent Seven-Nine ("Martian Invasion"); Six-Seven-One ("Edge of Impact")
- Occupation: Criminal and terrorist
- Family: Kyrano (half-brother); Tin-Tin Kyrano (half-niece)
- Nationality: Malaysian

The Hood is a fictional criminal and terrorist and the recurring villain of the 1960s puppet television series Thunderbirds and its adaptations. He is the primary antagonist of the International Rescue organisation, founded by Jeff Tracy. In the original series, the character possesses powers of hypnosis and telepathy and uses an array of disguises to carry out his activities undetected. He operates from a temple in the Malaysian jungle.

In most of his original series appearances, the Hood's objectives are to steal International Rescue's technological secrets and make a fortune by selling them to the criminal underworld. To this end, he repeatedly manipulates the organisation into situations that enable him to film the Thunderbird craft. Due to his opponents' quick thinking, or sometimes his own recklessness, the Hood's schemes invariably fail and all of his camera footage is destroyed. However, he is never captured and International Rescue remain ignorant of his identity.

The alias "Hood" originates in Thunderbirds comic strips and other tie-in media; in the series itself, the character is unnamed except in two episodes ("Martian Invasion" and "Edge of Impact") where he adopts the aliases "Agent Seven-Nine" and "Six-Seven-One". In the 2004 film adaptation, his real name is Trangh Belegant.

== Development ==
The name "Hood" was derived from the term hoodlum. Gerry Anderson also observed that the character was frequently masked, and that a mask "could be described as a 'hood'." Sylvia Anderson acknowledges that the Hood's appearances became less regular towards the end of the series (he does not feature in any episodes of the second season), explaining that, like Kyrano, the character "turned out to be less viable on the screen than on the page." To strengthen the character's antagonistic appearance, the puppet was fitted with an oversized head and hands.

In the 2004 live-action film adaptation, the Hood's actions are motivated by a personal vendetta against Jeff Tracy after he left the Hood for dead during a rescue operation. Actor Ben Kingsley, who played the re-imagined Hood, described the character as a "vengeful obsessive, a man who is determined to discredit the hero that did not save his life. So although he could be a hero to the rest of the world, I know the Achilles' heel and I want that obsessive quest to be fulfilled." The reason for the Hood's hatred of Jeff was changed in the remake, Thunderbirds Are Go, where he explained how he and Jeff were friends but Jeff would not allow the Hood to carry out his plans.

== Appearances ==
=== 1960s series and films ===
The character appears in six episodes of the original Thunderbirds: "Trapped in the Sky", "The Mighty Atom", "Martian Invasion", "Edge of Impact", "Desperate Intruder" and "Cry Wolf".

The Hood's precise origins are unknown. While it is known that he is the half-brother of Kyrano, the details of their relationship – such as which parent they share or which of them is the elder – remain a mystery, as does the cause of his hypnotic powers. Not even his real name is known; throughout the series, he is addressed only as "Agent Seven-Nine" or "Six-Seven-One", and each of these codenames is used in only one episode (Agent Seven-Nine in "Martian Invasion", and Six-Seven-One in "Edge of Impact"). His "Hood" name comes from tie-ins and spin-off media.

What is known for certain about the Hood is that he possesses a significant reputation among the less ethical groups of the world, as he is shown to be in contact with militaries and spy agencies that are seeking information or looking to have targets eliminated. He resides in a temple in a Malaysian jungle. It contains a statue of Kyrano (in front of which the Hood stands when communicating telepathically with his brother) as well as other hi-tech equipment that he uses to monitor his enemies and develop his plans.

The Hood's overriding aim is to uncover the secrets of the Thunderbirds machines and use them for his own ends. He engineers disasters in an attempt to record the machines in action – for example, planting a bomb aboard Fireflash ("Trapped in the Sky"), trapping film actors in a flooding cave ("Martian Invasion"), or triggering a nuclear meltdown so that he can hide a miniature camera on Thunderbird 2 ("The Mighty Atom"). His plans invariably fail, through International Rescue's intervention or his own mistakes and incompetence.

Despite his sophisticated plans, many of which show no regard for the innocent, the Hood has a short temper and struggles to improvise when his schemes do not work out as intended. On the one occasion when he actually manages to obtain footage of Thunderbirds 1 and 2 in action, he tries to get away in a light aircraft but crashes it, not knowing that it was grounded for repairs, and loses his photographs in the process ("Martian Invasion"). His arrogance is another handicap: on another occasion, he drives through a roadblock that he thinks has been erected to stop him, only to find too late that it was meant to stop vehicles going over a damaged bridge ("Edge of Impact").

The Hood is capable of establishing a telepathic link with his half-brother Kyrano, from whom he extracts sensitive information about International Rescue. He is also able to implant post-hypnotic suggestions to make Kyrano carry out certain actions after the link is broken. In "Martian Invasion", Kyrano is made to sabotage Thunderbird 1 so that the Hood can record the Thunderbirds without International Rescue's knowledge. Although these hypnotic intrusions take their toll on Kyrano, causing him to collapse to the ground in agony, he passes the incidents off as faintness or exhaustion and otherwise maintains unswerving loyalty to the Tracys. In "Desperate Intruder", the Hood hypnotises Kyrano's daughter, and his own niece, Tin-Tin, though this occurs offscreen. On recovering Tin-Tin states that she felt she knew him in some way.

Although the Hood and the Tracy brothers never come face-to-face in the series, the latter are aware of the former's existence. After the Hood is thwarted in "Martian Invasion", Virgil says he is sure that "Mr Stutt" (the Hood's alias at the time) was the person who has been out to undermine International Rescue from the beginning. Scott agrees but expresses confidence that they will apprehend him one day, whatever his disguise.

In the feature film Thunderbirds Are Go, the Hood is unmasked and exposed by Scott while attempting to infiltrate the Zero-X spacecraft before launch. During his escape, he is seemingly killed when Lady Penelope and Parker shoot down his helicopter.

The character returns as the primary villain in the sequel Thunderbird 6, where he goes by the codename "Black Phantom". On the DVD commentary, director David Lane joked that Black Phantom is the "son of the Hood", while Sylvia Anderson said that it is a different character. He operates from an abandoned airfield in Morocco which is later destroyed by Thunderbirds 1 and 2.

=== Comics ===
In the comics, the Hood's plans become more daring, with some plots seeing him come into direct contact with the Tracys. In one story he tries to expose International Rescue's location by bombing Thunderbird 2's hangar, forcing Virgil to move the craft and enabling the Hood to photograph it. During the subsequent cover-up – where it is claimed that Tracy Island is merely a theme park based on International Rescue – the Hood manages to infiltrate the island and almost succeeds in hypnotising John and Brains. However, he is captured and all his recent memories are erased to protect the Tracys' secret.

On another occasion, he captures Brains by faking the scientist's death, then exploits his genius to launch a direct assault on Tracy Island. Gordon is able to rescue Brains in time to thwart the Hood's attack, after which the Hood is recaptured and his memories erased once again. Other stories involve him setting up satellites that allow him to remotely take control of Thunderbirds 1 and 2, and hypnotising Kyrano in an attempt to gain entry to Tracy Island's Thunderbird hangars.

=== NES game ===
In the Thunderbirds NES game, the Hood threatens to bombard Earth with meteors unless the Tracys hand over all the Thunderbird craft within 60 days. After that period is up, the family defeats him.

=== 2004 film ===
The Hood
- Portrayed by: Ben Kingsley

In-universe information
- Full name: Trangh Belagant
- Family: Kyrano (half-brother); Tin-Tin Kyrano (half-niece)
- Nationality: Indian

In the live-action Thunderbirds, the character (portrayed by Ben Kingsley) openly goes by the name "the Hood", although Parker notes that it "sounds like an alias". Lady Penelope says that his real name is Trangh Belagant.

In the film, the Hood's actions against International Rescue are more direct. Having tracked the organisation to Tracy Island, he cripples Thunderbird 5 with a missile attack, trapping Jeff and the four eldest brothers on board, then proceeds to steal Thunderbird 2 and the Mole and use them to rob the Bank of London. His ambition is to frame International Rescue for both this heist and nine others, leaving the family disgraced and causing the collapse of the world's monetary system.

The nature of his powers has changed, being more akin to telekinesis (including abilities such as levitation) than hypnosis. Over-use of his powers temporarily weakens him. He tells Brains that he "was born with [his] powers". His half-niece Tin-Tin (Vanessa Hudgens) is shown to possess similar abilities but uses them only for good.

It is eventually revealed that the Hood was left for dead during one of International Rescue's early missions. The Hood blames Jeff for abandoning him, but Jeff tells Alan that there was no way to save him that would not have killed them both. Though given the chance to let the defeated Hood fall into the Mole's spinning drill head, Alan decides to pull him back up and hands him over to the authorities. The Hood is taken into police custody.

According to the film's costume designer, Marit Allen, the Hood's wardrobe was intended to evoke a dragon. This reptilian concept extended to his henchmen Transom and Mullion – the former having a lizard-like look, the latter resembling "a huge frightening turtle, if there's such a thing."

=== Remake series ===
The Hood
- Voiced by: Andres Williams

In-universe information
- Relatives: Mr Kyrano (brother); Tin-Tin Kyrano (niece)
- Nationality: British

In the remake series Thunderbirds Are Go, the Hood does not demonstrate any hypnotic abilities, but retains his skill for hatching cunning plans. He is shown to command significant resources, including at least three henchmen, a large flying machine, and the technology to create and distribute a large number of earthquake-inducing machines around the floor of the Pacific Ocean.

The Hood has been observing International Rescue for some time, although the Tracy family had no positive proof of his existence. He is Kayo Kyrano's uncle, but initially only Jeff and Grandma Tracy know this. It is suggested that the Hood is responsible for Jeff's disappearance and possible death, as Jeff was apparently investigating reports of the Hood before his spacecraft vanished. Unlike in the original series, the Hood uses holographic projections to disguise himself instead of masks and costumes.

In the Series 1 finale, the Hood infiltrates Tracy Island and takes control of the Thunderbirds. He tries to undermine the Tracy brothers' trust in Kayo by disclosing their blood relation and claiming that she is working for him. However, Kayo tricks him into seizing nearby Mateo Island instead of Tracy Island, and Thunderbirds 1, 2, and 5 destroy his aircraft before he can escape. The series ends with his capture by the Global Defence Force.

In Series 2, the Hood breaks out of prison with the help of new villain The Mechanic. He makes The Mechanic his henchman, implanting The Mechanic's brain with a device that forces him to obey the Hood's commands. The Hood later allows himself to be captured by International Rescue to escape the attacks of a rogue Mechanic, but after Brains persuades The Mechanic to stand down in return for removal of the implant, the Hood escapes.

In Series 3, the Hood joins forces with brother and sister Fuse and Havoc, the "Chaos Crew", who pilot their own advanced vehicles, in order to create destruction and further the Hood's plans. This culminates in his (and the brothers') locating Jeff in outer space. It is revealed that Jeff and the Hood were friends until the Hood decided that he was being held back by Jeff's plans. The Hood, along with the Chaos Crew, is recaptured and placed under permanent arrest at the end of the series.

Whereas in the original series the Hood showed no indication of knowing of Tin-Tin's existence, the revival series shows that he knows of her, and genuinely loves her.

== Reception ==
The authors of The Rough Guide to Cult TV view the character as an update of Masterspy from the earlier Supermarionation series Supercar. To John Peel, the Hood marks a progression from the "silly, stereotyped" villains of Supercar, Fireball XL5 and Stingray: "Most of his appearances were quite serious, and he was lethally rather than comically inclined." Ian Haywood describes the Hood as "both an absolute and an ethnic villain, whose jungle temple is a demonic reflection of the Tracy Island, and a signifier of the Yellow Peril of the Cold War". For Jonathan Bignell, the character's villainy transcends conventional geopolitical boundaries: his Eastern appearance and exotic powers "associated him with James Bond villains of the period, and pervasive fears of China as a 'third force' antagonistic to the West." Nicholas J. Cull likens the Hood to "an evil version of Yul Brynner [as the King of Siam] in The King and I".

Jon Abbott of TV Zone magazine calls the Hood a "rather weak villain" who exists "because the show simply needs a bad guy" and whose goal of photographing the Thunderbird machines would seem "hilarious" to newer audiences. Abbott also believes that the character represents a negative ethnic stereotype, writing that the "use of a foreign culture to create a sinister atmosphere [...] dates the show badly" and that while Gerry Anderson often avoided casting Russians as the enemy in his 1960s productions, he seemingly "missed the point where it comes to the Orient." Marcus Hearn believes the Hood's supernatural powers to be at odds with the series' technological focus: "In a format devoted to realistic or at least feasible presentations of scientific and engineering concepts, the episodes featuring this Oriental magician sometimes strike an incongruous note." He states that these attributes make the Hood the "most problematic" regular cast member and views the character's secret relation to Kyrano as one of the series' main weaknesses. Hearn also notes that the Hood appears less often in later episodes, suggesting that he was not a favourite of the writers.

Ben Kingsley's portrayal of the Hood in the 2004 film has drawn a mixed critical response. Glenn Erickson of the review website DVD Talk writes that Kingsley plays the role with "complete actorly overkill" and likens the characterisation to that of a clichéd "evil baddie". He argues that the script uses ethnic stereotyping in its depiction of the Hood and his relatives, the Kyrano family, noting that both the Hood and his half-niece Tin-Tin possess hypnotic powers that constitute "inscrutable Oriental wizardry". Alex Hewison of The Digital Fix calls Kingsley's performance "flat and dull, as though the ignominy of having to wear a red kimono and ridiculous face paint was enough to send him into a semi-catatonic state of weary indifference." In contrast, Dennis Prince of DVD Verdict describes Kingsley as "simply excellent, devouring the role of the wicked yet dryly witty criminal mastermind, providing a hiss-worthy baddie who never becomes too evil". Philip Tibbetts of Den of Geek suggests that while the actor "hams it up on occasion", he "manages to restore some menace" to a film that is sometimes "frustratingly infantile".

Carolyn Percy of the Wales Arts Review praises the re-imagined Hood of Thunderbirds Are Go, describing him as "much more consistently competent and dangerous" than the original. She applauds the decision to make him British and remove his hypnotic abilities, stating that the original character's Far Eastern tones made him a "racial stereotype" and his supernatural powers "weren't in keeping with the rest of the show."
