= Tracy Island =

Fictional island in the TV series Thunderbirds

- Thunderbirds location
- The Tracy villa (centre‑left) and swimming pool (bottom‑right) from the original Thunderbirds. Commentators have compared the look of the villa to Frank Lloyd Wright architecture.
- First appearance: "Trapped in the Sky" (30 September 1965)
- Created by: Gerry and Sylvia Anderson

In-universe information
- Type: Secret base (headquarters of International Rescue)
- Location: South Pacific Ocean
- Locations: Tracy Villa; Cliff House; Round House
- Characters: Tracy family; Kyrano family; Brains

Tracy Island is the secret headquarters of the International Rescue organisation in the 1960s British Supermarionation television series Thunderbirds and its adaptations. In the original series, the heavily camouflaged island is located in the South Pacific Ocean and is home to the Tracy family, scientists Brains and Tin-Tin, and housekeeper Kyrano. The name "Tracy Island" originates in Thunderbirds comic strips and other tie-ins; within the series, the characters simply refer to it as International Rescue's "base".

The island has had several releases as a children's toy, most notably in the early 1990s, 2000 and 2015. The first two models were commercially very successful, causing retailers to run out of stock. It was the 1993 British Association of Toy Retailers' Toy of the Year.

== Original series depiction ==
Derek Meddings, special effects supervisor on the puppet series, described his excitement at designing Tracy Island as "one of those feelings you get when you're a kid, imagining that you're Robinson Crusoe living on a lovely island."

The centrepiece of the island is the Tracy Villa, the home of the island's residents. Various features of the original series' villa – such as the outside staircase descending to water, the large windows, and the prominent stone chimney – indicate that its design was inspired by Frank Lloyd Wright's Fallingwater house.

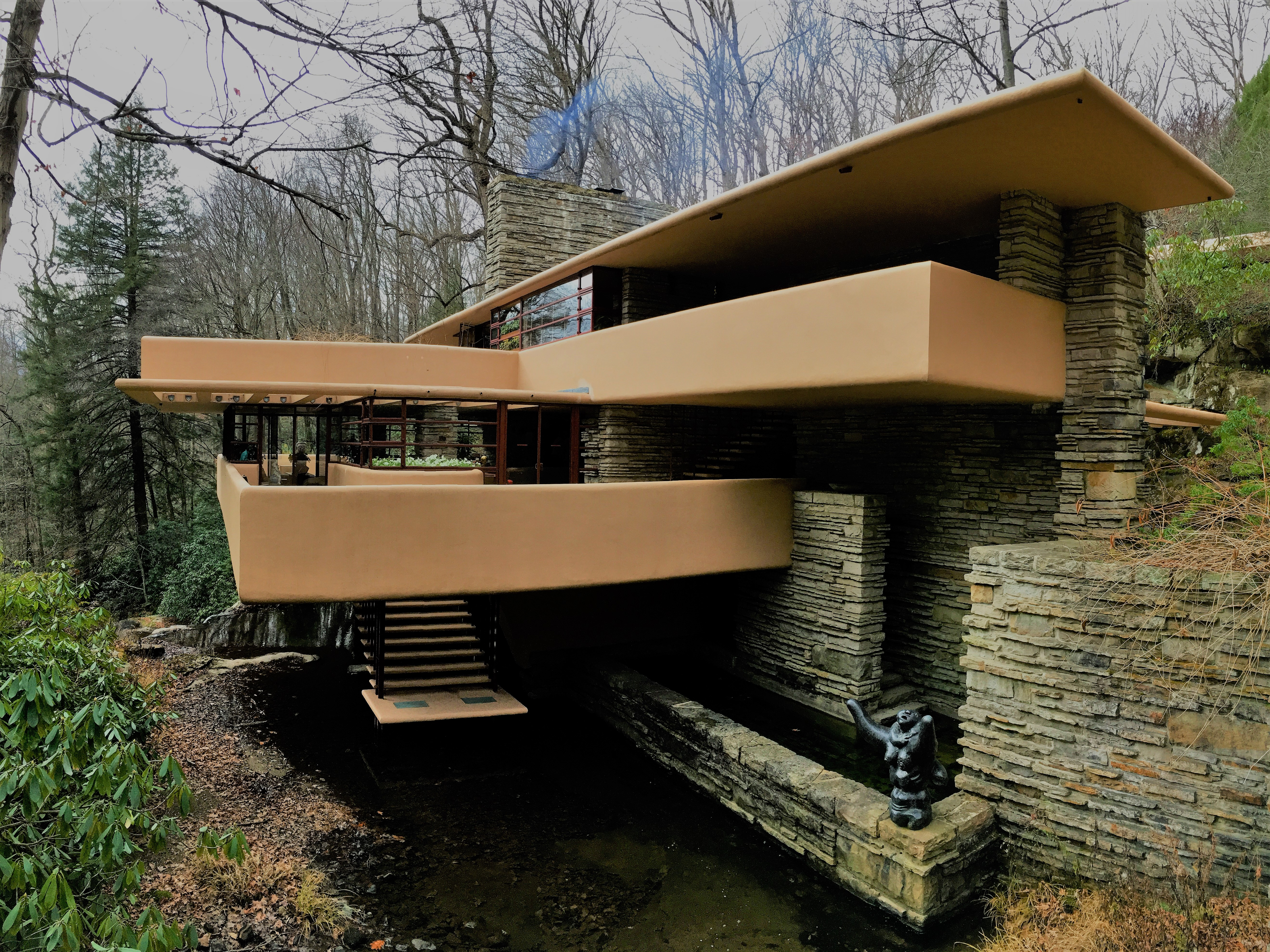
Fallingwater house museum in Pennsylvania inspired the look of the Tracy Villa.

The crews of Thunderbirds 1 to 3 board their craft from the villa's lounge, where various launch chutes are concealed behind walls and under furniture. The lounge also serves as a rescue coordination and communications centre. One of the walls features photo portraits of each of the Tracy brothers in uniform. When any of the brothers makes a video call to base, the transmission is routed to his portrait, whose eyes electronically flash and beep to signal the incoming call. If the island has visitors from the outside world, a security protocol called "Operation Cover-Up" is initiated, whereby the wall portraits slide away to be replaced by photographs of the brothers in off-duty attire. Another wall houses a video call portrait for Lady Penelope, International Rescue's London field agent.

Thunderbird 1 is launched from a hangar underneath the island's retractable swimming pool, at the foot of the villa. The entrance to the Thunderbird 2 hangar is concealed by a false rock-face and leads onto the island's runway. On exiting the hangar, the palm trees lining the runway swing outwards to accommodate the wingspan of Thunderbird 2. After taxiing along the runway, Thunderbird 2 takes off from a hydraulic launch platform. Thunderbird 3 is launched from underneath the Round House (the island's guest accommodation).

Although the security of the island is stated to be assured by jamming equipment, in the Thunderbirds comic strips published in TV Century 21 it proves to be somewhat vulnerable due to the machinations of the Hood. Learning everything about the island by brainwashing the technically minded Brains and extracting all of his knowledge concerning the island, the Hood launches his strongest attack yet on International Rescue, destroying several Thunderbird craft and many of their hangars, with the exception of Thunderbirds 1 and 4. (The canonicity of the Thunderbirds comics adventures is open to interpretation.)

== 2004 design ==
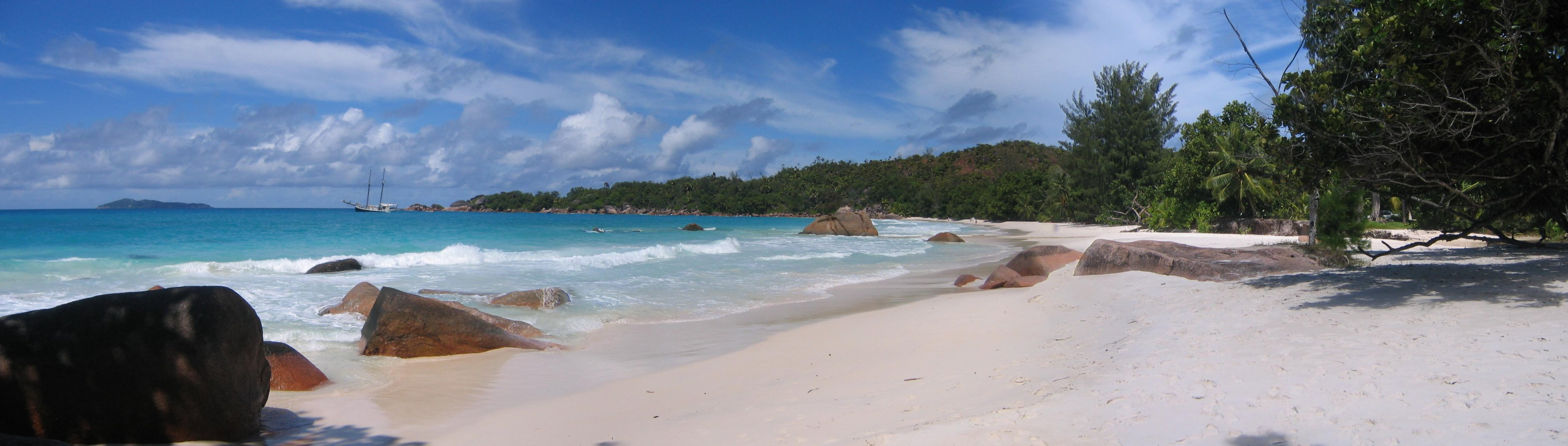
Shooting locations for the live-action version of Tracy Island included Anse Lazio beach on Praslin in Seychelles (pictured).

For the 2004 live-action film, the main shooting location for the island exteriors was North Island in the Seychelles. Co-producer Mark Huffam described Tracy Island as "the most idyllic [...] imaginable, with crystal-clear waters, tropical jungle and mountainous peaks", adding that it was "fantastic" that North Island provided "all these essential elements". Various locations on Praslin, including Anse Lazio beach and Vallée de Mai nature preserve, were also used.

The buildings on the re-imagined island were deliberately given a "retrofuturistic" appearance, described by production designer John Beard as "based in the '60s and '70s, which is similar to what we were doing for Brazil." Further inspiration was drawn from the work of Oscar Niemeyer and others. The interiors set at Pinewood Studios was built in what Beard described as a "kind of double-'S' shape". He added that "because we're not building the top, it means we can hang the building from the top ceiling in the studio, which we couldn't have done outside."

In a publicity exercise, Ford Motor Company, which built the re-imagined FAB 1 for the 2004 film, commissioned a Thunderbirds-themed live event and interactive experience for the 2004 British International Motor Show. The 7,400-square-metre (80,000 sq ft) stand was designed as a replica of Tracy Island, complete with a beach, a lake, an aircraft hangar and an overhead model of Thunderbird 2. Titled "Thunderbirds Powered By Ford", it was one of the largest exhibits ever built by construction company Imagination and proved to be a success, attracting 250,000 to 300,000 visitors and winning a certificate of "High Commendation" at the 2004 Marketing Brand Design Awards.

== Reception ==
Tim Bevan, producer of the 2004 film, called Tracy Island "one of the main characters of the original Thunderbirds series". Rob McLaughlin of the entertainment website Den of Geek named it the seventh-best secret base in film and TV but challenged one particular design aspect: "There's the small matter of the ever-present risk of a great big rocket ship appearing out the bottom of [the swimming pool] and squashing you." The Los Angeles Times' TV critic Robert Lloyd describes the island's architecture as "stylish mid-century modern".

Jon Abbott of TV Zone magazine criticised the base's layout, questioning why the control centre is located in the lounge when a hidden control room would eliminate the need for "Operation Cover-Up". Abbott asks why Jeff Tracy would even need uniformed photographs of his sons, regarding this as one of several aspects that make the Tracy Island lounge a "delightful deranged indulgence". However, he concedes that for child viewers, the existence of these features made Thunderbirds "much more fun to watch than Z-Cars or Dr. Finlay's Casebook".

Commentator Ian Haywood, who interprets the series partly as a struggle between nature and science, considers Tracy Island a technological utopia where nature has been brought under human control, describing the location as "a perfect 'false self', a brilliantly simulated natural paradise". He also views it as an imperialist symbol in that it effectively serves as "a Pacific base for American influence", which he believes "strikes a chilling chord in today's post-Cold War era of American global peace-keeping."

The Tracy Island of the partly-CGI remake series Thunderbirds Are Go (2015–2020) was positively received by Wired UK magazine, whose reporter Matt Kamen described the island as "stunningly detailed, and any returning viewers will be delighted to see classic features such as the retractable swimming pool revealing a rocket silo have been retained for the update."

== Toys and Blue Peter ==
In the UK, repeats of Thunderbirds on BBC2 in the early 1990s led to renewed public interest in the series and a fresh wave of tie-in toys, including a Tracy Island playset by Matchbox. In the run-up to Christmas in 1992, demand for the set rose sharply and retailers ran out of stock, leading to overnight queuing outside shops. The story was reported in the national news and has since been cited as the archetypal mistake to be avoided by the toy industry during the Christmas shopping season; according to the BBC, the toy "caused hysteria in shops across the UK." The playset was a contender for the British Association of Toy Retailers' (BATR) 1992 "Toy of the Year" Award, but lost to WWF Hasbro action figures due to the stock shortage. It subsequently won the 1993 award.

In January 1993, the BBC children's TV programme Blue Peter responded to the stock shortage by showing viewers how to build a home-made version out of household waste. The BBC was then, in turn, overwhelmed by requests for copies of the instruction sheet for making the model. Eventually the broadcaster stopped sending out the sheets and released a recording of presenter Anthea Turner's demonstration, Blue Peter Makes a Thunderbirds Tracy Island, on VHS. In 2015, Radio Times described Blue Peter's island-building demonstration as "one of the most iconic moments" in the programme's history.

The BBC's re-launch of Thunderbirds in 2000 prompted a resurgence in the toy's popularity and a second Blue Peter demonstration. The new Tracy Island playset by Vivid Imaginations was released to a positive critical response and was listed as one of the top ten children's toys by the BATR. As before, supply of the toy did not keep up with demand. In December, the BBC reported that only 60,000 units of the Chinese-made product would be shipped to the UK before Christmas, despite demand being estimated at half a million. Vivid attributed the stock shortage to a lack of microchips caused by high demand from the mobile phone industry. The playset ultimately became one of the best-selling toys of 2000, with demand estimated at up to ten times greater than supply.

In 2005, Thunderbirds' 40th anniversary, The Daily Telegraph journalist Jim White commented that "four generations of kids have fallen under the spell of Parker, Brains and the Hood, constructing their own Blue Peter Tracy Islands out of detergent bottles and sticky-backed plastic." In 2015, to coincide with the debut of Thunderbirds Are Go, Vivid released a new version of the toy incorporating smart technology.
