= Tin-Tin Kyrano =

Fictional character in Thunderbirds television show

- Thunderbirds character
- The original puppet character
- First appearance: "Trapped in the Sky" (30 September 1965)
- Created by: Gerry and Sylvia Anderson
- Designed by: Christine Glanville (sculptor)
- Voiced by: Christine Finn

In-universe information
- Occupation: Scientist and engineer
- Affiliation: International Rescue
- Family: Kyrano (father); The Hood (half-uncle)
- Significant other: Alan Tracy; Eddie Houseman (formerly)
- Home: Tracy Island
- Nationality: Malaysian

Tin-Tin Kyrano is a fictional character introduced in the 1960s British Supermarionation television series Thunderbirds. A resident of Tracy Island, she works as a laboratory assistant to Brains and occasionally joins the Tracy brothers on rescue missions.

In the original TV series and its film sequels, Tin-Tin is voiced by Christine Finn, while in the 2004 live-action film, the character was played by Vanessa Hudgens. In the remake series, she was reimagined as "Kayo" Kyrano and voiced by Angel Coulby.

== Original series ==
=== Development ===
Sylvia Anderson, Thunderbirds co-producer and character co-creator, wrote that Tin-Tin was conceived mainly to "redress the balance" of the "male-dominated" main puppet cast. She regretted that little of the backstory she had devised for Tin-Tin and her father progressed from script to screen, and that the pair's visibility was limited, in her view, to a number of cameo appearances.

The character's name is derived from the Malaysian term for "sweet". The puppet was sculpted by Christine Glanville.

=== Character biography ===
Born on 20 June 2004 or 2043, Tin-Tin is the daughter of Kyrano – an old friend of, and manservant to, International Rescue founder Jeff Tracy. She joins the organisation shortly after it begins operations, having inadvertently become involved in its first mission when the maiden flight of Fireflash, in which she is travelling from London to Tokyo, is sabotaged by her villainous half-uncle the Hood ("Trapped in the Sky"). Her further education, specialising in mathematics and engineering, was fully paid for by Jeff in gratitude for her father's service to him ("Trapped in the Sky").

Tin-Tin performs a variety of roles on Tracy Island, International Rescue's base of operations. They range from a secretary to Jeff ("Terror in New York City"), to a laboratory assistant to scientist and engineer Brains ("City of Fire"; "Danger at Ocean Deep") to active participation in missions, most notably the rescue of the Sun Probe spacecraft ("Sun Probe"). She is also known to accompany Lady Penelope on espionage missions ("The Cham-Cham") and is a qualified pilot. Tin-Tin is romantically involved with Alan Tracy, although their relationship is briefly strained when Eddie Houseman, Tin-Tin's ex-boyfriend, visits the island ("End of the Road").

=== Reception ===
Sylvia Anderson remembered the character as "mostly housebound" and less of an adventurer than Lady Penelope, although she "had her followers" and served as a "decorative sidekick to her macho boss". Commentators are divided on Tin-Tin's importance to the story. Jack Hagerty and Jon C. Rogers believe that prior to her major role in Thunderbird 6, and despite her status as a series regular, the character was "usually nothing more than window dressing, with her actual contributions being a bit vague". David Ryan of website DVD Verdict characterised Tin-Tin as "part hanger-around-the-house, part local-squeeze-for-Alan's-pleasure, and 99 per cent useless".

Stephen La Rivière is less critical, writing that over the course of the series the character moved away "from being the submissive hired help to a more assertive, independent role". However, he concedes that her development was overshadowed by Penelope's. John Peel offers a similar assessment, criticising the character's appearance in the first episode, "Trapped in the Sky" ("a helpless-female-to-be-rescued role"), but praising her contributions in "Sun Probe" and "The Cham-Cham" (stating that in the latter she "really comes into her own", emerging as Penelope's "sidekick"). He argues that compared to other Anderson series, Thunderbirds gave its minority of female characters more opportunities to prove their worth. Daniel O'Brien describes Tin-Tin, as well as Penelope and Grandma Tracy, as "intelligent" and "independent-minded", praising Thunderbirds for its progressive attitude to characterisation.

The Star Observer describes Tin-Tin as a "kooky icon of 60s Orientalism". Nicholas J. Cull cites the character's Malaysian nationality and status as a "positive non-white character" as examples of the series' rejection of ethnonational stereotyping. This contrasts with her relative, the Hood, whose Eastern appearance and manner were intrinsic to his villainy. Glenn Erickson of DVD Talk presents an opposing view, arguing that while Thunderbirds often resorted to stereotypes, it employed them "with some sensitivity – all except for Tin-Tin", whom he negatively characterises as a "literal China doll". Kate Hunt of the University of Glasgow, who studied the series' presentation of tobacco smoking, note that unlike prolific smokers such as Penelope, Tin-Tin was seen "incongruously" and "inconsistently" with a cigarette in just one episode ("End of the Road"). She also writes that the character fills a socially ambiguous position on Tracy Island, appearing variously as an "adopted daughter, secretary, and occasional member of the International Rescue team".

== 2004 film ==
Tin-Tin Kyrano
- Portrayed by: Vanessa Hudgens

In-universe information
- Family: Kyrano and Onaha (parents); The Hood (half-uncle)
- Significant other: Alan Tracy
- Nationality: Indian

In the 2004 live-action film, Tin-Tin is portrayed by Vanessa Hudgens and plays a major role in the plot. She is the 15-year-old daughter of Kyrano and his wife Onaha, and lives with them on Tracy Island. As well as being younger than the TV version, she is no longer Malaysian but depicted as being of Indian descent. She possesses telekinesis and mind control powers similar to those of her half-uncle, the Hood (and, similarly, weakens momentarily as a side effect of their use).

=== Reception ===
Hudgens' interpretation of the character has polarised opinion. DVD Verdict's Dennis Prince comments that the reimagined younger Tin-Tin is "full of spunk and plenty of girl power attitude (which never becomes truly obnoxious, mind you)", and a "rather thinly stretched adaptation" of the original. James Gray of the website The Digital Fix considers the character "not too bad, although she does spend the entire time smiling her head off, even in scenes where it really isn't that appropriate". Alex Hewison, commenting for the same website, is dismissive, judging the character a victim of gender tokenism and "superfluity" as regards her "hyper-chaste love subplot" with Alan (Brady Corbet). Erickson writes positively of the decision to have Tin-Tin inherit the Hood's "inscrutable Oriental wizardry", use of which is indicated on-screen by her eyes becoming "cat-like, vertical slits – a nice touch". Critics have written of perceived similarities between the live-action Tin-Tin and the fictional characters Carmen Cortez (of the Spy Kids film series) and Hermione Granger (of the Harry Potter novels and films).

== Remake series ==
Tanusha "Kayo" Kyrano
- Voiced by: Angel Coulby

In-universe information
- Occupation: Head of security on Tracy Island
- Relatives: The Hood (uncle)
- Nationality: British

For the remake series, Thunderbirds Are Go, Tin-Tin was renamed Tanusha "Kayo" Kyrano due to potential copyright issues in respect of the Hergé comic book character Tintin. Kayo is Tracy Island's head of security and often serves as Alan's co-pilot on Thunderbird 3. In the first episode, she is given her own Thunderbird vehicle: Thunderbird Shadow. At the end of the episode, she is confirmed to be the Hood's niece, but it would appear that only Jeff and Grandma Tracy are aware of her ties to the villain, with the Hood taunting her about her keeping that information secret from the Tracy brothers. The Hood reveals this relationship to the brothers during the final episode of series 1, and Kayo later tells them that Jeff decided to keep it a secret from them.

=== Development and reception ===
Describing the new character as "far more military", executive producer Estelle Hughes commented: "What we wanted to do was create a 100% new and fully-rounded modern girl character whose personality could be newly made, rather than fit into pre-existing sibling parameters. That meant she could disagree with the [Tracy sons] and have an independent streak." Hughes stated that Kayo was developed to be a spiritual "sixth" Tracy child, albeit specialising in security instead of rescue operations. She added that this characterisation made Kayo more "proactive and nuanced" than the original Tin-Tin.

Commenting that the remake brings Tin-Tin "up to date", Carolyn Percy of Wales Arts Review praises how Kayo's character development is no longer devoted entirely to "potential love interests". She also applauds the storylines for probing the character's relationship with the Hood in greater detail than the "vague references" of the original series, stating that this produces a "suspenseful subplot".

== Kyrano ==
Kyrano
- First appearance: "Trapped in the Sky"
- Designed by: John Blundall (sculptor)
- Voiced by: David Graham

In-universe information
- Occupation: Manservant on Tracy Island
- Nationality: Malaysian

Kyrano is the father of Tin-Tin and half-brother of the Hood. He is the manservant in the Tracy household, sharing domestic duties with Grandma Tracy. He is renowned for serving tea and coffee within the house and is upset when Parker tries to take over this duty from him in the episode "The Mighty Atom".

Kyrano was once the heir to a rubber plantation fortune in Malaysia, but was cheated out of it by the Hood. After this, he decided to withdraw from the world of material gain and spend the rest of his life in meditation. He lived all over the world, pursuing careers as a chef in Paris, a gardener in England, and a scientist producing synthetic foods from plants for astronauts. When his old friend Jeff Tracy offered him a position on Tracy Island, he accepted.

The Hood has a hypnotic power over Kyrano that he uses to extract information on International Rescue and its secrets, and on one occasion compel Kyrano to sabotage Thunderbird 1 ("Martian Invasion"). Kyrano never discloses this connection to anyone, dismissing the Hood's telepathic intrusions as mere "dizzy spells" despite his otherwise unquestionable loyalty to the Tracys.

A widower, Kyrano's full name is never revealed in the series and he seems happy to be referred to by his surname.

In the 2004 film, Kyrano is played by Bhasker Patel.

Kyrano does not appear in the remake series, Thunderbirds Are Go, in which he is said to be retired. However, his daughter and brother are still major characters. In "Signals – Part 1", Kayo mentions that Kyrano was devastated by Jeff's disappearance and that she hopes that he will come out of retirement if Jeff is found alive.

=== Reception ===
Jon Abbott of TV Zone magazine describes the original Kyrano as a "fawning manservant" who is patronisingly treated by Jeff, arguing that the character represents a negative stereotype.

Marcus Hearn finds Kyrano a "poorly sketched character", calling his secret ties to the Hood "another of Thunderbirds' weak links" and stating that the series reveals almost nothing of his and Tin-Tin's backstory.
