= Christine Glanville =

English puppeteer

- Glanville in 1992
- Born: Nancy Christine Fletcher; 28 October 1924; Halifax, West Yorkshire, England
- Died: 1 March 1999 (aged 74); High Wycombe, Buckinghamshire, England
- Occupation: Puppeteer

Christine Glanville (born Nancy Christine Fletcher; 28 October 1924 – 1 March 1999) was an English puppeteer who spent much of her professional life contributing to television series produced by Gerry Anderson.

== Career ==
Glanville became involved in the film industry in war service at Elstree Studios and studied art during her free time. After the Second World War she joined a puppet theatre company with which her parents were connected, Ebor Marionettes.

Glanville joined AP Films in 1957 and worked on all its series, as well as the later Supermarionation presentations of Anderson's Century 21 Productions. She worked closely with fellow puppeteer Mary Turner. In addition to her primary role of lead puppet operator, Glanville was often responsible for the design and construction of the puppets themselves (Thunderbirds; 1965–66) and sculpted marionettes of Scott Tracy, Alan Tracy, and Tin-Tin Kyrano.

The likeness of Mrs Appleby, a supporting character that appeared in The Secret Service (1969), was based on Glanville's mother. Others she created included Masterspy and his sidekick Zarin (Supercar), Venus (Fireball XL5), Titan, Agent X20 and Atlanta Shore (Stingray) Captain Black and the Angels (excluding Destiny) in Captain Scarlet and the Mysterons.

== Family ==
Glanville was born in Halifax, West Yorkshire, to James Fletcher and Phyllis Blatchford (maiden; 1890–1976), who were married July 1923 in Halifax, England. She moved with her parents to Ilford, Essex, as an infant. One of her 3rd great-grandparents was Domenico Corri (1746–1825), an Italian musician and publisher who, in the late 18th century, moved from Rome to Edinburgh to teach music. She was a grandniece of Robert Peel Glanville Blatchford (1851–1943), English socialist campaigner, journalist, and author.

== Death ==
Glanville worked in puppetry and lived in High Wycombe, Buckinghamshire, until her death on 1 March 1999 at the age of 74.
