= Trapped in the Sky =

- Thunderbirds episode
- The Elevator Cars prepare to save Fireflash. These shots used looping rolls of canvas to simulate movement of ground and sky. An error involving a snapped control wire was kept in the episode.
- Episode no.: Series 1 Episode 1
- Directed by: Alan Pattillo
- Written by: Gerry & Sylvia Anderson
- Cinematography by: Paddy Seale
- Editing by: David Lane & Len Walter
- Production code: 1
- Original air date: 30 September 1965

Guest character voices
- Sylvia Anderson as; Flight Attendant: Ray Barrett as; Co-Pilot Frank Harris, Assistant Operator Assistant Controller TX-204 "Target 1" Pilot: Peter Dyneley as; Commander Norman "Interceptor 1" Pilot: Christine Finn as; London Airport Announcer: David Graham as; Captain Hanson Lieutenant Bob Meddings Passenger Doctor Airport Police Officer Crash Tenders Chief: Shane Rimmer as; TX-204 "Target 1" Co-Pilot

Episode chronology
← Previous —	Next → "Pit of Peril"

"Trapped in the Sky" is the first episode of Thunderbirds, a British Supermarionation television series created by Gerry and Sylvia Anderson and filmed by their production company AP Films (APF) for ITC Entertainment. Written by the Andersons, it was first broadcast on ATV Midlands on 30 September 1965.

Set in the 2060s, the series follows the exploits of International Rescue, an organisation that uses technologically advanced rescue vehicles to save human life. The main characters are ex-astronaut Jeff Tracy, founder of International Rescue, and his five adult sons, who pilot the organisation's main fleet: the Thunderbird machines. In "Trapped in the Sky", master criminal the Hood plants a bomb on board the new atomic-powered airliner Fireflash before it departs on its maiden flight. Unable to land for fear of setting off the bomb, the crew and passengers' only hope of survival lies with International Rescue, who must embark on their first mission.

While planning the episode, the Andersons drew inspiration from Gerry's memories of his National Service in the RAF, during which he witnessed the fatal crash of a Mosquito aircraft and the emergency landing of a damaged Spitfire. To save studio space, special effects director Derek Meddings filmed the rescue of Fireflash on a static set using a system of looping canvases instead of a miniature runway.

"Trapped in the Sky" was originally filmed as a 25-minute pilot in late 1964. Lew Grade, the Andersons' financial backer, was so impressed by the production that he ordered APF to rewrite and extend every Thunderbirds episode from 25 to 50 minutes so that the series would fill a one-hour TV timeslot. Well received on its first broadcast, "Trapped in the Sky" is widely regarded as one of the best episodes of Thunderbirds. It was adapted into an audio play in 1966 and had its first UK-wide showing in 1991 on BBC 2. It was later remade as "Fireflash", an episode of the remake series Thunderbirds Are Go.

== Plot ==
The Hood, a master criminal based in a temple in Malaysia, is telepathically linked to his half-brother Kyrano, the manservant to the Tracy family on Tracy Island. Using this connection to extract information from Kyrano, the Hood learns that International Rescue – an organisation formed by Jeff Tracy and his five sons – is now operational. The psychological trauma inflicted by the Hood causes Kyrano to faint in front of Jeff.

Determined to acquire the secrets of International Rescue's Thunderbird machines, the Hood produces a rescue situation which will allow him to spy on the organisation. Travelling to London International Airport, he plants a bomb in the engine hydraulics of Fireflash: an atomic-powered, hypersonic airliner leaving on its maiden flight to Tokyo. The passengers include Kyrano's daughter Tin-Tin. After Fireflash takes off, the Hood anonymously calls the air traffic control tower to reveal his sabotage, informing Commander Norman that the bomb will detonate from the impact of landing. Air traffic control alerts Captain Hanson and his co-pilot. The shielding around the Fireflash's atomic reactor needs regular servicing; if the aircraft does not land, in just over two hours everyone on board will suffer fatal radiation exposure.

In an attempt to remove the bomb, the tower commandeers a military aircraft from the US Air Force which docks with Fireflash in flight. This enables Lieutenant Bob Meddings to enter the avionics compartment through a service hatch. The operation ends disastrously when Meddings loses his grip and falls out of the hatch, deploying his parachute just moments before hitting the ground.

John Tracy, who has been monitoring the airport's radio traffic from Thunderbird 5, reports the events to Tracy Island. Jeff dispatches Scott and Virgil in Thunderbirds 1 and 2 to rescue Fireflash. Arriving at the airport, Scott assures Norman of International Rescue's good faith but orders that no photographs be taken of the Thunderbirds. Airport police move in to guard Thunderbird 1, but the Hood, disguised as one of the officers, is able to break into the cockpit and photograph the controls. Scott is alerted by the on-board camera detector. The Hood flees in a patrol car and is chased up the M1 motorway by police.

Virgil lands Thunderbird 2, from which he deploys two remote-controlled Elevator Cars and a manned master car. The plan is to guide Fireflash into a soft landing on top of the cars to avoid setting off the bomb. However, the first rescue attempt is aborted after one of the remote-controlled cars breaks down and crashes into a parked aircraft. Virgil activates a reserve car and Fireflash makes a second descent, this time touching down on all three cars. Virgil applies brakes but loses control of the master car; he crashes but is unhurt. Supported by the other cars, Fireflash comes to a halt. The bomb is dislodged but fails to explode.

Learning that the Hood has evaded the police, Scott assigns International Rescue's London agents – Lady Penelope and her chauffeur Parker – to stop him. Penelope and Parker chase the Hood in FAB 1, Penelope's specially modified Rolls-Royce, and use the car's machine gun to blast him off the motorway. The Hood survives but his photographs are ruined.

Back on Tracy Island, Jeff has Kyrano examined by a doctor from the mainland. After giving Kyrano a clean bill of health, the doctor notices a newspaper article about the Fireflash incident and remarks how he would be honoured to shake International Rescue's hand. With a parting handshake, Jeff grants the oblivious doctor his wish. He then turns to his sons and announces: "Boys, I think we're in business."

== Regular voice cast ==
- Sylvia Anderson as Lady Penelope
- Ray Barrett as Alan Tracy, John Tracy and the Hood
- Peter Dyneley as Jeff Tracy
- Christine Finn as Tin-Tin Kyrano
- David Graham as Gordon Tracy, Parker and Kyrano
- David Holliday as Virgil Tracy
- Shane Rimmer as Scott Tracy

== Production ==
I remember seeing an aircraft coming into land with its wheels still up. Luckily it was warned off just as it was about to touch down. I will also never forget seeing a Mosquito aircraft that was giving an aerobatics display crashing and blowing up. Years later, when we were working on pre-production for Thunderbirds, I recalled those two incidents and together they helped me form the basic idea for the first episode.

— Gerry Anderson on his inspiration for the episode

The plot of "Trapped in the Sky" was inspired by Gerry Anderson's memories of his National Service in the RAF from 1947 to 1949. While stationed at RAF Manston, he saw a Mosquito plane go out of control and crash to the ground during an air show, killing 20 people. A few months later, a Spitfire with a damaged undercarriage successfully made an emergency landing at the base. These incidents formed the basis of the story, which sees the Hood plant a bomb on the airliner Fireflash.

Anderson dictated the script of the 25-minute pilot to his wife, Sylvia, at their villa in Portugal over four sessions during the spring of 1964. At this stage, the series had the working title "International Rescue" and the star vehicles were called "Rescues 1" to "5". Although the episode has no on-screen title, it was referred to throughout the production as "Trapped in the Sky". As an in-joke, the guest character Lieutenant Bob Meddings was named after two of APF's staff: art director Bob Bell and special effects director Derek Meddings. Meddings' original design sketch for Fireflash indicated that the airliner was flown by BOAC; in the completed episode, it is operated by the fictional "Air Terrainean".

=== Filming ===
After five months of pre-production, filming began in the late summer of 1964. The Fireflash landing sequence presented Meddings with the challenge of having to film a scale runway inside a relatively small effects studio that offered little scope for camera movement. Rather than build a miniature runway and move the camera, his solution was to isolate the basic set elements (the grass verge in the foreground, the sky background and the runway separating them) and construct separate loops of canvas, each painted to represent one element; the canvases were then fitted to rollers that were run at speeds proportionate to their distances from the camera, creating the illusion of a dynamic shot on a continuous set. This technique, which Meddings called the "rolling road" (or "roller-road"), was a progression of the "rolling sky" technique that he had created to film aerial sequences on APF's previous series, Stingray. The crash of the remote-controlled Elevator Car was originally an error, caused when the wire pulling the scale model unexpectedly snapped in the middle of a shot. Meddings was so impressed with the result that he asked the Andersons to write the crash into the script. The original footage of the car losing control was then supplemented by an additional shot that shows it hitting the stationary aircraft and bursting into flames.

The dialogue was recorded before actor Matt Zimmerman was hired as the voice of Jeff's youngest son, Alan Tracy. For this episode only, Alan's dialogue (consisting of two lines: "OK, father" and "Good luck, Scott") was supplied by Ray Barrett, the voice of John and the Hood. Despite this, Zimmerman is still listed in the episode's closing credits. The closing scene with the doctor includes a continuity error: when Jeff initiates "Operation Cover-up" to maintain International Rescue's secrecy, portraits of the Tracy brothers in uniform are replaced with alternatives that show them in mufti; however, in a subsequent shot, the edges of the in-uniform portraits are still visible.

=== Post-production ===
The incidental music was recorded in December 1964 at Olympic Studios in Barnes with a 30-piece orchestra. The opening and closing theme music are variations on the series' main theme, "The Thunderbirds March", and are unique to the episode. Sound effects, such as Kyrano screaming during the Hood's telepathic incursion, are also heard in the title sequence's story montage, and the standard picture of the Mole is absent from the closing titles. Until a very late stage of production, the closing credits were to be accompanied by a sung end theme – "Flying High", performed by Gary Miller – which series composer Barry Gray wrote to contrast with the instrumental opening theme. However, Anderson and Gray later decided that the song was tonally unsuitable and replaced it with the march two weeks before the TV premiere.

Like other early episodes of Thunderbirds, "Trapped in the Sky" was originally 25 minutes long. This running time was doubled after a preview screening that was attended by Lew Grade, APF's owner and financial backer. Grade was so impressed with the story and effects that at the end of the screening, he declared, "That's not a television series, that's a feature film!" and ordered Gerry Anderson to rewrite and expand all episodes to fill a one-hour timeslot. He later increased the series' budget per episode from £25,000 to £38,000.

"Trapped in the Sky" and another eight fully or partially filmed episodes were each extended to 50 minutes by adding new scenes and subplots. For "Trapped in the Sky", these included Lieutenant Meddings' boarding of Fireflash and International Rescue's abortive first rescue attempt. The additional material was filmed during the production of "Operation Crash-Dive", which was written as a sequel to "Trapped in the Sky" and sees the return of Fireflash.

== Broadcast and reception ==
"Trapped in the Sky" was first transmitted at 7:00 p.m. on Thursday 30 September 1965 on ATV Midlands. For its Granada Television premiere on 20 October, the episode was transmitted in an alternative two-part format.

In the early 1990s, the broadcast rights to Thunderbirds were acquired by the BBC, paving the way for the series' first UK-wide network transmissions. "Trapped in the Sky" was first shown on BBC2 at 6:00 p.m. on Friday 20 September 1991, when it was seen by 6.8 million viewers. It was repeated in 1992 and (for the first time with surround sound) on 3 September 2000.

=== Critical response ===
Making that first episode was not easy. There were lots of technical problems and it took ages to shoot the various scenes showing how the pilots reached their craft. We got very weary with it but in the end, when we all saw the finished film, the way Gerry [Anderson] had planned and edited it with the editors, we all agreed it was well worth it.

— Director Alan Pattillo on the episode

Upon its original broadcast, "Trapped in the Sky" was praised by L Marsland Gander of The Daily Telegraph, who called it "a show that has to be seen to be disbelieved." Writing for the same newspaper in 2011, Simon Heffer recalled watching the episode as a boy: "I felt as though the whole landscape of what passes for my imagination had been changed ... It caused an excitement of the sort that is possible only for the very young, and it lasted for days. Indeed, every Saturday night was a renewal of the miracle." Sylvia Anderson noted that as the first episode of the series, "Trapped in the Sky" includes a large amount of exposition. She considered the roles of Penelope and Parker "brief but effective".

Mike Fillis of TV Zone and Cult Times magazines considers the episode a "tour de force" and a series highlight, describing the story as "riveting" and the bomb plot as "very topical". Stuart Galbraith IV of DVD Talk likens the premise to "an airborne version of Speed". Marcus Hearn praises the episode's suspense and "extraordinary" effects. He also notes its "fast-paced Hollywood style" and focus on nuclear danger, describing it as a "topical spectre that would become a preoccupation in future episodes." Jon Abbott of TV Zone judges the tension "of feature-film quality" but also comments that "the total lack of security for the Fireflash nags at the viewer." He calls the idea of a nuclear-powered aircraft "wonderfully pointless", adding that it "could only have been dreamed up in the '60s, when science was unquestioned and the possibility of building something so silly always outweighed any safety considerations."

In 2004, "Trapped in the Sky" was re-released on DVD in North America as part of A&E Video's The Best of Thunderbirds: The Favorite Episodes collection. Reviewing the release for website DVD Verdict, David Gutierrez gave the episode a score of 95 out of 100, calling the rescue "amazing" and adding: "Television rarely has moments as exciting as the Fireflash attempting a forced landing." In 2019, British magazine TV Years (a sister publication of TV Choice) listed the "incredibly tense" Fireflash rescue as the seventh-greatest moment in TV science fiction. In 2025, as part of the series' 60th anniversary celebrations, a restored version of the episode, along with "Terror in New York City", was released in cinemas nationwide. The Guardian stated that "Trapped in the Sky" remains very well made and entertaining.

A BBC Online retrospective describes Fireflash as a "beautifully-envisioned, Concorde-like craft" and compares the London Airport lounge to "a set from a Dean Martin movie". Model-maker Martin Bower praises the "realistic" design of the Elevator Cars, believing them to be "among the most memorable of vehicles". In a review of the Thunderbirds soundtrack, BBC Online's Morag Reavley praises the incidental musical piece "Fireflash Landing", describing it as one of several "catchy, pulse-quickening tunes" that "come fast and furious."

Vincent Law of fanzine Andersonic argues that the episode's status as a "pilot" is not detrimental to the plot, which he regards as being based on "advanced technology, upon which the characters are reliant, going awry." He criticises some of the characterisation, noting that by the end of the episode Tin-Tin seems to be none the worse for her ordeal aboard Fireflash. He also describes the dialogue as "limp and routine at times ... and overall much less witty than Stingray." Nonetheless, he sums up "Trapped in the Sky" as "a great opener, arguably the best episode of the series."

== Adaptations ==
The episode has had several audio adaptations. The first of these was an audio play, narrated by Shane Rimmer in character as Scott Tracy, which was first released as the Century 21 mini-album Thunderbird 1 (code MA 108) in 1966. In 1990, the play was transmitted on BBC Radio 5 as the first episode of a Thunderbirds radio series, with an introduction by Gerry Anderson and new narration by Rimmer. The episode was adapted for Penguin Audiobooks in 2001.

On 18 December 1994, "Trapped in the Sky" aired in re-edited form on US network UPN as the first episode of Turbocharged Thunderbirds, a PolyGram-Bohbot co-production that combined footage from original Thunderbirds episodes with new live-action sequences featuring a pair of Californian teenagers. It was later remade as "Fireflash", the fifth episode of the remake series Thunderbirds Are Go. First broadcast on 25 April 2015, the remake reuses characters and plot elements from the original, including Captain Hanson and the Elevator Cars rescue.
