= Thunderbirds (2004 film) =

Film by Jonathan Frakes

- American theatrical release poster
- Directed by: Jonathan Frakes
- Screenplay by: William Osborne; Michael McCullers
- Story by: Peter Hewitt; William Osborne
- Based on: Thunderbirds by Gerry Anderson; Sylvia Anderson
- Produced by: Tim Bevan; Eric Fellner; Mark Huffam
- Starring: Bill Paxton; Anthony Edwards; Sophia Myles; Ben Kingsley
- Cinematography: Brendan Galvin
- Edited by: Martin Walsh
- Music by: Hans Zimmer
- Production companies: Working Title Films; StudioCanal
- Distributed by: Universal Pictures (Worldwide); Mars Distribution (France)
- Release dates: 14 July 2004 (Amsterdam premiere); 23 July 2004 (UK); 30 July 2004 (US); 4 August 2004 (France)
- Running time: 95 minutes
- Countries: United Kingdom; United States; France
- Language: English
- Budget: $57 million
- Box office: $28.3 million

Thunderbirds is a 2004 science fiction action-adventure film directed by Jonathan Frakes, written by William Osborne and Michael McCullers, and based on the television series of the same name created by Gerry and Sylvia Anderson. The film's plot concerns the Hood, who traps International Rescue (IR) leader Jeff Tracy and four of his sons on board the damaged Thunderbird 5 to steal the other Thunderbird vehicles and commit crimes for which IR will be blamed, prompting Jeff's youngest son Alan and his friends Tin-Tin and Fermat to stop him. Unlike the original TV series, which combined puppetry and scale-model visual effects in a filming style dubbed "Supermarionation", the film was made in live-action with CGI effects.

Released on 20 July 2004 in the United Kingdom and ten days later in the United States by Universal Pictures, the film received negative reviews from critics, with most critiques aimed at its wooden characters and thin plot, and was also a box-office bomb. Gerry Anderson also criticised the film, describing it as "the biggest load of crap I have ever seen in my entire life", although Sylvia Anderson praised it as a "great tribute" to the series. The film's soundtrack includes the songs "Thunderbirds Are Go" by pop-rock band Busted, which peaked at number one on the UK singles chart and later won the 2004 UK Record of the Year award.

== Plot ==
In the near future, the Tracy family, led by widowed former astronaut Jeff Tracy, operate International Rescue (IR), a secret organisation that aids those in need during disasters using technologically advanced machines called Thunderbirds, operating out of Tracy Island in the South Pacific. His youngest son Alan attends Wharton Academy, a boarding school in Massachusetts, with his best friend Fermat Hackenbacker, son of the Thunderbirds' resident engineer Brains, and dreams of being a Thunderbird pilot like his older brothers Scott, John, Virgil, and Gordon.

IR agent Lady Penelope Creighton-Ward and her valet, Aloysius Parker, return Alan and Fermat to Tracy Island for spring break, where they are reunited with their friend Tin-Tin – the daughter of the Tracy family butler, Kyrano, but Alan is grounded shortly after arrival for trying to launch Thunderbird 1 without first activating its anti-detection shield. Unbeknownst to the inhabitants of Tracy Island, the Hood, a psychic criminal mastermind, had one of his accomplices plant a tracking beacon on the hull of Thunderbird 1 during a recent rescue on an oil rig, leading him to the base of International Rescue. Off shore from a submarine, the Hood fires a missile into space at the orbiting Thunderbird 5, cutting off all of IR's communications and leaving space monitor John in peril. Jeff, Scott, Virgil and Gordon go to rescue John in Thunderbird 3, but the Hood and his team take over the island's command centre and shut off power to Thunderbird 5, trapping them all inside.

The Hood reveals that during one of International Rescue's first operations, Jeff abandoned him in a collapsing illegal diamond mine, but rescued his brother, Kyrano. As revenge, he plans to use Thunderbird 2 to rob ten of the world's major banks, thus plunging the international monetary system into chaos, with International Rescue held responsible and disgraced. Fermat removes Thunderbird 2's guidance chip, delaying the Hood's plan, and Alan contacts Jeff with its remote transmitter, insisting on confronting the Hood. Lady Penelope and Parker receive a distress signal from Tracy Island and fly there in FAB 1, where they engage the Hood's minions in combat, but the Hood defeats them with his psychic powers. He then makes Alan give up the guidance chip by threatening to hurt his captured friends; Alan complies, and they are all locked in the compound's walk-in freezer.

The Hood and his minions pilot the now-repaired Thunderbird 2 to London and use the Mole to sink a monorail line into the Thames and drill into the Bank of England's vaults. Alan and company escape and restore power to Thunderbird 5 before setting off in pursuit of the Hood in Thunderbird 1. Arriving in London, Alan and Tin-Tin rescue the submerged monorail car using Thunderbird 4 before pursuing the Hood. The rest of the Tracy family return from space in Thunderbird 3 and confront the Hood at the Bank, where he captures Jeff and Lady Penelope and challenges Alan to defeat him. While Alan fights the Hood on a catwalk over the moving drill of the Mole, the Hood is defeated by Tin-Tin, who as his niece is also able to use his powers. The Hood taunts Alan to let him die as his father did, but Alan rescues him, knowing that his father had actually tried unsuccessfully to save the Hood. The Hood and his team are arrested and International Rescue return to their island, where Alan, Fermat, and Tin-Tin are inducted as official members of the team.

== Cast ==
- Brady Corbet as Alan Tracy, the 14-year-old protagonist and pilot of Thunderbird 4 at the end of the film
- Soren Fulton as Fermat Hackenbacker, Alan's best friend
- Vanessa Hudgens as Tin-Tin Belagant, Alan's crush, daughter of Kyrano, and niece of the Hood
- Bill Paxton as Jeff Tracy, the widowed father of Alan and his brothers and the founder/leader of International Rescue
- Anthony Edwards as Ray "Brains" Hackenbacker, the engineer who created the Thunderbirds, father of Fermat
- Sophia Myles as Lady Penelope Creighton-Ward, International Rescue's London agent
- Ron Cook as Aloysius Parker, Lady Penelope's butler/chauffeur
- Ben Kingsley as the Hood (real name Trangh Belagant), Kyrano's half-brother, Tin-Tin's uncle and the movie's main villain
- DeObia Oparei as Mullion, one of the Hood's goons, a martial arts expert
- Rose Keegan as Transom, one of the Hood's goons, who has a crush on Brains
- Philip Winchester as Scott Tracy, Alan's 24-year-old brother and the pilot of Thunderbird 1
- Lex Shrapnel as John Tracy, Alan's kind-hearted 22-year-old brother and the space monitor of Thunderbird 5
- Dominic Colenso as Virgil Tracy, Alan's 20-year-old brother and the pilot of Thunderbird 2
- Ben Torgersen as Gordon Tracy, Alan's 18-year-old brother and the astronaut of Thunderbird 3
- Bhasker Patel as Kyrano Belagant, Jeff's retainer and Tin-Tin's father
- Harvey Virdi as Onaha Belagant, Tin-Tin's mother
- Lou Hirsch as the Headmaster of Wharton Academy, the boarding school in Massachusetts that Alan and Fermat attend
- Demetri Goritsas as Chuck, an anchorman for the IWN News Network
- Genie Francis as Lisa Lowe, a reporter for the IWN News Network

Additionally, director Jonathan Frakes has an uncredited role as a police officer during the sequence in which the Hood and his minions are arrested.

== Production ==
=== Development ===
Thunderbirds was the third theatrical release based upon the series created by Gerry and Sylvia Anderson. It was preceded by Thunderbirds Are Go in 1966 and Thunderbird 6 in 1968, both films using the Supermarionation production techniques of the series.

Development of the film started in the mid-1990s when PolyGram Filmed Entertainment purchased the rights to the entire ITC Entertainment library, which included the original Thunderbirds series. Seeing the big-screen potential of the series, Peter Hewitt was signed on to direct, while Karey Kirkpatrick was signed on to write. While Hewitt was a lifelong fan of the series, Kirkpatrick was not, but watched all 32 episodes of the original series to immerse himself within the lore of the series. Hewitt and Kirkpatrick wrote a draft of the screenplay which was faithful to the series, but which they hoped would not alienate audiences who were unfamiliar with the franchise. Their script featured the Hood trying to steal Tracy Island's power core to power a device controlled by arch villain Thaddeus Stone, which would transfer all of Earth's gravity to the moon. After four drafts, Kirkpatrick left the project due to Working Title's concerns that the film would not play well in the US market (Working Title was the unit of PolyGram, and later Universal Studios when that company in 1999 bought out PolyGram's assets, that produced films in Britain). Hewitt also left the production shortly afterwards due to his dislike for the new direction the film was taking.

Hewitt was replaced by Jonathan Frakes, a big fan of the original series whose credentials included another family science fiction film, Clockstoppers.

Mike Trim, who had worked on the original Thunderbirds show, was hired as a concept artist. Ultimately, his work, which included a design for a new pod vehicle named the "Telehandler", went unused.

=== Casting ===
The film was the first family film of Brady Corbet, who played protagonist Alan Tracy.

I left these cryptic messages on their cell phones. 'This is your father speaking. Come and join me for a meal.' [We] met at the hotel and walked across Hyde Park on to Oxford Street. And just for a moment I pretended that these were my five sons. I'm in London; I'm [Jeff]; it was a very empowering feeling ... the idea of having five sons walking around, all of them smart and sensible ... It really gave me the part. I felt like I knew [Jeff].

— Bill Paxton on preparing for his role as Jeff Tracy

Bill Paxton took on the role of Alan's father, billionaire ex-astronaut Jeff Tracy. He had memories of watching the original show as a child in Texas; a year before he was asked to join the film, he had been watching the show on VHS with his jet-lagged family in Amsterdam as it was the only English video he had been able to find in the city. Paxton described his character as "a kind of teacher, this father figure who has to teach his sons, particularly his youngest son Alan, these basic lessons of ethics and integrity, about doing the right thing". One reason that he was attracted to the role was because it reminded him of 1960s non-profit vocationalism, and people "choosing life professions not for monetary gain but for something that would be good for their souls".

Ben Kingsley accepted the part of the Hood because his children were Thunderbirds fans and, having just finished House of Sand and Fog, he was ready for a more light-hearted role. He described himself as feeling "totally at home" on set, but joked that he should have kept the original Hood's voice.

Sophia Myles was cast as Lady Penelope, who would recall Frakes as "lovely", and having a "great, positive energy". Much of her dialogue (and Ron Cook's as Parker) was rewritten by Richard Curtis, as it was not thought to be funny enough. It was because of watching the film with his son that Steven Moffat offered Myles a role in Series 2 of Doctor Who.

Anthony Edwards was cast as Brains; he joined the production imagining it was a "silly little kids' movie", but was impressed by Frakes', and production designer John Beard's, "reverence" for the original series. He also recalled the producers hoping Gerry Anderson would be a part of the production; conversely, Jamie Anderson claims that his father was "kept at an arm's length" from the project, and that only in the final stages of post-production was he offered a large sum of money to promote the film, which he declined.

=== Filming and post-production ===
Filming began on 3 March 2003, at North Island in the Seychelles. An initial seven-day schedule became ten days after unexpected rain interfered with the shoot, and Fulton, who played Fermat, had to try to avoid developing a tan. Throughout production, Corbet was vocal about what he saw as flaws in the script; Corbet would go on to write and direct films of his own.

Filming later moved to Pinewood Studios and on-location shooting in London. Upon arriving in London, Paxton, to immerse himself in the role, invited Winchester, Colenso, Torgersen, Corbet and Shrapnel for a meal. Shrapnel would later recall the experience positively, calling Paxton a "great role model and a very dear friend".

Other filming locations included Wellington College, Berkshire for Alan's school ("Wharton Academy"), University College London for the exterior of the fictional Bank of London, and Cliveden House, Buckinghamshire for Lady Penelope's mansion; this latter location had speed bumps removed from the drive to avoid damage to the FAB 1 vehicle.

A number of scenes were excised from the final cut of the film. A different opening was filmed, with Alan partaking in some kind of motorcycle race; footage was included in trailers for the film. FAB 1 was also intended to be fired at by missiles when approaching Tracy Island for the second time, upon which a pedalo life raft would deploy; footage of this is used for a comedic scene at the end of the film. Versions of both scenes are present in novelisations and tie-in books.

The film includes over 500 CGI effects shots. According to Frakes, the production design purposely made liberal use of primary colours as a "retro throwback to the original [Thunderbird] ships, which were red, blue and green."

Thunderbirds is dedicated to the memory of Stephen Lowen, a rigger on the film, who died in a fall while dismantling one of the sets.

=== Differences from the original ===
There are numerous changes from the original series. The Thunderbirds fleet, Tracy Island, and the International Rescue uniforms have all been redesigned; Tracy Island is now referred to by name in dialogue, as is the Hood. International Rescue is also referred to as "Thunderbirds" by the general public. Although the exact identities of the Thunderbirds remain secret, International Rescue now allows itself to be filmed and photographed on missions, which was forbidden in the original series. (Note: Written by Alan Fennell. Directed by David Elliott and David Lane (21 October 1965). "Terror in New York City". Thunderbirds. Episode 13.)

== Reception ==
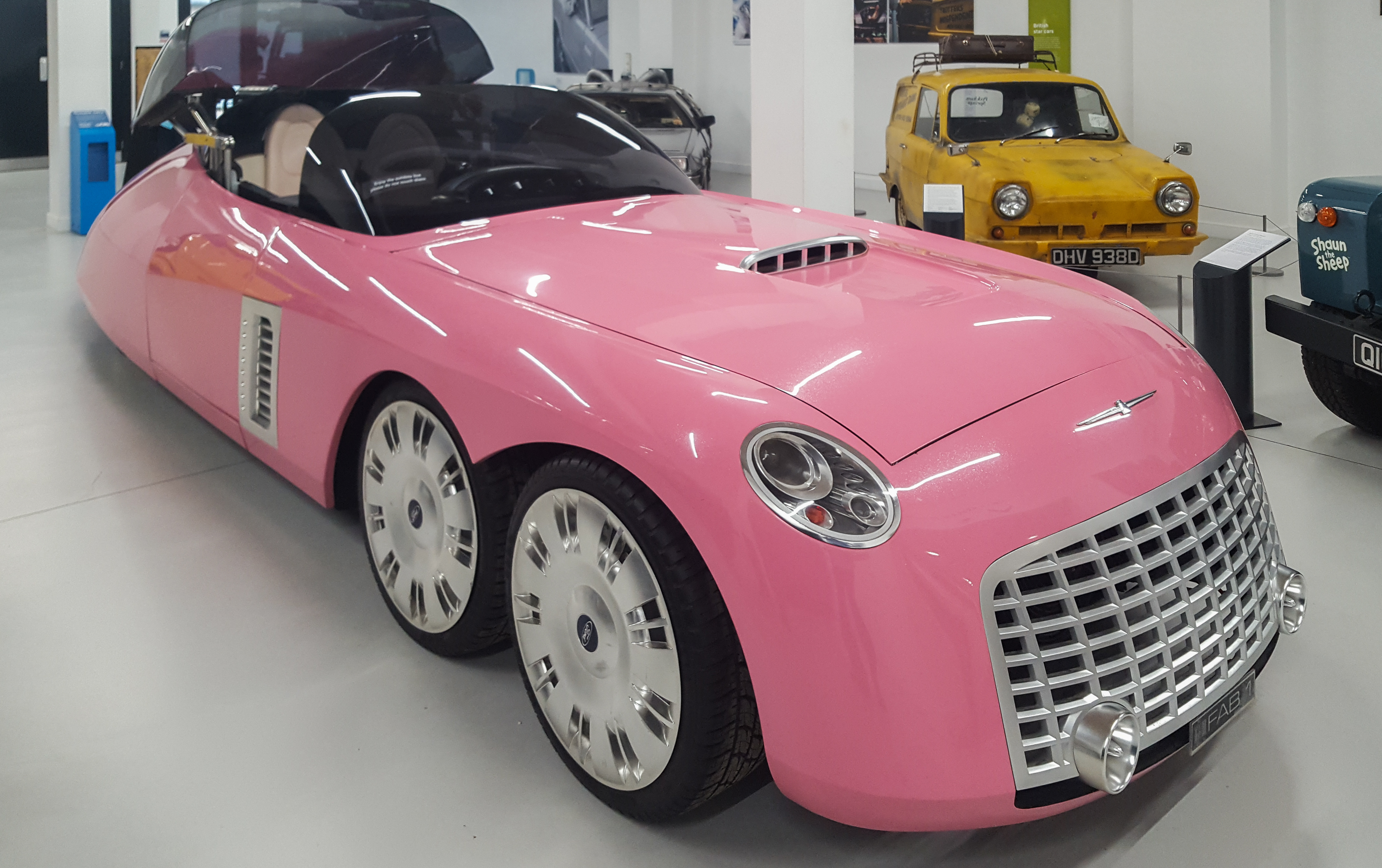
The FAB 1 car designed by Ford of Europe for the film, on display at the British Motor Museum in Gaydon, Warwickshire

=== Box office ===
Thunderbirds grossed $28,283,637 worldwide, and with an estimated $57 million budget, the film was a box office bomb. Frakes attributed the film's commercial failure to a combination of stiff competition from its contemporaries Shrek 2 and Spider-Man 2 and its poor critical reception. Stuart Kemp of The Hollywood Reporter suggested that it may have been due to lack of appeal for older audiences who remembered the TV original.

=== Critical response ===
Thunderbirds received negative reviews. On the review aggregation site Rotten Tomatoes, the film holds a 18% "rotten" rating based on 103 reviews. The site's consensus states: "Live-action cartoon for kids." Metacritic, which uses a weighted average, assigned the film a score of 36 out of 100, based on 29 critics, indicating "generally unfavorable" reviews.

Those familiar with the series tended to be more negative. Sukhdev Sandhu of The Daily Telegraph called it "a quite cretinous travesty of the original series", saying that the film lacks the TV series' romantic approach to technology (particularly mentioning its rushed version of the countdown to the Thunderbirds takeoff) and suffers from thin plotting and dialogue. He also regarded the entire trend of making films based on decades-old TV series as well intentioned but misguided, arguing, "Those programmes can be seen on terrestrial and cable TV. They're available on DVD. They don't need reviving and updating." The Houston Chronicle's Amy Biancolli similarly called the film a "rather breathtakingly misconceived attempt to revisit a vintage TV show that did not under any circumstances need to be revisited". She found the central character Alan "whiny and uninteresting", the script poor, the plot contrived and unsatisfying, and the acting wooden, though she noted that her three children enjoyed it much more than she did. She gave it a C−. Ian Freer, writing for Empire, assessed that the film fails to either evoke nostalgia in the generation which watched Thunderbirds as children or provide snappy entertainment for the current generation of children. Like Sandhu, he felt the countdown sequence was so rushed that there is no sense of occasion to a Thunderbird taking to the sky. He also said that the child leads lack spirit and chemistry, and the adult characters suffer from excessive exposition and flat characterisation. While he did praise Sophia Myles' performance and the vehicle designs, he considered the film an overall failure and gave it two out of five stars. Roger Ebert noted, "You know, Thunderbirds was going to go on my list of the worst movies of the year, but it just wasn't good enough." Critics widely described the film as a second-rate Spy Kids imitator.

During development, creator Gerry Anderson was invited to act as creative consultant, but was left out when the studio felt there were enough employees on the payroll acting as part of the creative team. The studio offered him $750,000 (£432,000) to attend the premiere but Anderson could not accept money from people he had not worked for. He eventually saw the film on DVD and was disappointed, declaring "It was disgraceful that such a huge amount of money was spent with people who had no idea what Thunderbirds was about and what made it tick." He also said that it was "the biggest load of crap I have ever seen in my entire life".

Co-creator Sylvia Anderson, and the one responsible for character development, was given a private screening of the film and attended the London premiere. She expressed a far different opinion to that of her former husband, stating "I felt that I'd been on a wonderful Thunderbirds adventure. You, the fans, will I'm sure, appreciate the sensitive adaptation and I'm personally thrilled that the production team have paid us the great compliment of bringing to life our original concept for the big screen. If we had made it ourselves (and we have had over 30 years to do it!) we could not have improved on this new version. It is a great tribute to the original creative team who inspired the movie all those years ago. It was a personal thrill for me to see my characters come to life on the big screen."

=== Legacy ===
Though Thunderbirds has had a negative reputation with many fans of the original franchise, cast members frequently speak about the film having devoted fans, especially those who were children when the film was released. The film is occasionally critically reassessed, and cast members frequently praise their time working on the film; Sophia Myles has said "It was amazing... I only have the fondest of memories of making that film, [and] quite frankly I don't really care what anyone else thought... for me it was one of the best times of my life." Dominic Colenso, who moved to a career as a communications expert, often describes himself as a "Former Thunderbird".

A 60-foot model of Thunderbird 3, based on Dominic Lavery's design for the film, was created by ZenithOptimedia to market the film, and stood in Trafalgar Square close to the film's release. It was subsequently displayed in Blackpool (at one point being decorated with images from Pablo Picasso's Guernica) until early 2008, when it was purchased by Eastern Airways; at present it remains on display at Humberside Airport.

== Soundtrack ==
- "Thunderbirds Are Go" – performed by Busted

== Home Media ==
The film was released on DVD and VHS on 15 November 2004 in the UK and Ireland, and 21 December in the US and Canada.
