= Thunderbirds Are Go (TV series) =

Animated series

- Genre: Action; Adventure; Science fiction
- Created by: Richard Taylor
- Based on: Thunderbirds by Gerry & Sylvia Anderson
- Voices of: Rosamund Pike; Thomas Sangster; Rasmus Hardiker; David Menkin; Kayvan Novak; David Graham; Angel Coulby; Teresa Gallagher; Andres Williams
- Theme music composer: Barry Gray
- Opening theme: "The Thunderbirds March"
- Composers: Ben Foster; Nick Foster
- Countries of origin: United Kingdom; New Zealand; Australia
- Original language: English
- No. of series: 3
- No. of episodes: 78 (list of episodes)

Production
- Executive producers: Estelle Hughes; Giles Ridge; Richard Taylor; Andrew Smith
- Cinematography: Simon Godsiff
- Running time: 22 minutes
- Production companies: ITV Studios; Pukeko Pictures; Weta Workshop

Original release
- Network: ITV (CITV)
- Release: 4 April 2015 – 22 February 2020

Thunderbirds Are Go is an animated science fiction television programme produced by ITV Studios and Pukeko Pictures. It uses a combination of computer-generated animation and live-action models. It is a reboot of the series Thunderbirds created by Gerry and Sylvia Anderson which follows the exploits of International Rescue (IR), a rescue organisation run by the Tracy family out of their secret island base in the Pacific Ocean. They use technologically advanced craft for land, sea, air and space rescues in their operations, the most important of which are a set of vehicles called the Thunderbirds, piloted by the five Tracy brothers.

The programme premiered on 4 April 2015 and concluded on 22 February 2020, running for 78 episodes across three series. It was well-received by critics and fans of the original series, reacting positively to the series. It has spawned several branches of merchandising since its broadcast.

== Background ==
A revival of the 1960s science fiction Supermarionation television series Thunderbirds was approved by co-creator Gerry Anderson when Richard Taylor, the founder of Weta Workshop, visited him at Pinewood Studios while he was working on New Captain Scarlet. On 4 February 2013, ITV Global Entertainment and Pukeko Pictures officially announced the revival under the title Thunderbirds Are Go! Production began in June 2013 at Weta Workshop, while the principal voice cast was announced on 30 September 2014.

Each series consists of 26 episodes with transmission split into multiple parts. Series 1 was broadcast between 4 April–20 June 2015 and 31 October 2015 – 23 January 2016. A second series was green-lit on 18 December 2014 and aired between 22 October 2016 – 7 January 2017 and 30 September–16 December 2017. A third and final series was confirmed on 5 May 2016 and was broadcast between 31 March–26 May 2018, 18 May–13 July 2019 and 4 January–22 February 2020.

== Premise ==
Set in the 2060s, Thunderbirds Are Go follows the exploits of the Tracy brothers – Scott, Virgil, Alan, Gordon, and John – who form the backbone of International Rescue (IR): a life-saving organisation that operates from a hidden base in the Southern Pacific Ocean, and who save people from disasters and dangerous situations using technologically advanced craft for land, sea, air and space rescue, the most prominent of these being five vehicles called "Thunderbirds", each one operated by one of the brothers. In addition to the brothers, IR also includes additional members who offer assistance and support: Chief of Security Tanusha "Kayo" Kyrano, who conducts covert and security operations through the use of a specialised Thunderbird Shadow with stealth capabilities; engineer Brains, who provides technological and mechanical support both at the base and in the field on occasion; Grandma Tracy, the brothers' maternal support who tends to their home needs; and London operatives Lady Penelope Creighton-Ward, an English aristocrat, and Aloysius "Nosey" Parker, a chauffeur and former thief, who conduct investigative and espionage work when required.

Although most rescues involve contending with disaster caused by unforeseen incidents or the actions of criminals, a number are orchestrated by IR's main adversary known only as "The Hood" – a British criminal mastermind who despises the organisation and seeks to often steal their technology while conducting crimes to make him wealthy. Prior to the premiere episode of the programme, the Hood is known to IR and is responsible for the loss of the brothers' father, Jeff Tracy, the founder of IR and a close friend of Colonel Casey, the head of the Global Defence Force (GDF). In the second series, the programme introduced a second villain called "The Mechanic", who causes havoc and eventually helps to break out the Hood, after he is arrested by the GDF at the end of the first series, only to later turn on him to break free from his control, whereupon he later surrenders, on condition that Brains helps him secure his freedom. In the third series, a pair of villains called the "Chaos Crew" – formed of siblings Havoc and Fuse – join with the Hood to cause world-wide chaos, and become a considerable problem for both the GDF and IR.

Much of the episodes focus on rescue operations, many of which include elements from the original series – an example includes a remake of the original series premiere episode with a modern take on its plot. Although all episodes mainly include unique characters who have only one appearance, several created for Thunderbirds Are Go make reoccurring appearances, often with them being put into new situations they need rescuing from, though overarching storylines for each series focused mainly on the prominent villains for that series and the actions they undertake. Throughout the programme, the loss of Jeff to his sons plays a key element in a number of stories, both in relics found by the brothers, the various lessons they recall him teaching them, and the people who knew him best. The second-half of the third and final series eventually included a final story arc focused on Jeff, in which IR discovered him to be alive, rather than dead as presumed, but trapped in deep space. Amid a few standard rescues, the next few episodes focused on the Tracy family developing the means to reach and rescue him, culminating in the brothers eventually bringing him home in the 'Zero-XL', a spacecraft assembled with the five main Thunderbirds.

== Cast ==
=== Main ===
- Rasmus Hardiker as Scott Tracy and Alan Tracy
- David Menkin as Virgil Tracy and Gordon Tracy
- Thomas Brodie-Sangster as John Tracy
- Angel Coulby as Kayo Kyrano
- Kayvan Novak as Brains
- Rosamund Pike as Lady Penelope Creighton-Ward
- David Graham as Parker

=== Recurring ===
- Sandra Dickinson as Grandma Tracy
- Andres Williams as The Hood
- Adjoa Andoh as Colonel Casey, the commanding officer of the Global Defence Force (GDF)
- Teresa Gallagher as EOS, an AI which assists John aboard Thunderbird 5
- Chris Jarman as The Mechanic (Series 2–3), an unwilling villain under the control of the Hood who later becomes an ally to International Rescue
- Aimee-Ffion Edwards as Havoc (Series 3), one half of the Chaos Crew, a skilled hacker
- Craig Stein as Fuse (Series 3), Havoc's brother, the other half of the Chaos Crew, a fighter and demolitions expert
- Marc Silk as Captain Wayne Rigby (Series 3), a GDF officer assigned to arrest the Chaos Crew
- Kayvan Novak as Ned Tedford, an unlucky recurring rescue victim, accompanied by his pet plant Gladys
- Rhys Darby as Langstrom Fishler, a foolish scientist and recurring rescue victim
- Jack Whitehall as Francois Lemaire, an explorer and recurring rescue victim
- Taj Atwal as Madeline Lemaire, Francois' wife and biographer, fellow recurring rescue victim
- Teresa Gallagher as Professor Moffat, a colleague of Brains' who has a crush on him
- Rich Hall as Captain Lee Taylor, Jeff's fellow astronaut and best friend, with whom he co-founded International Rescue

==== Notes ====
- Kayvan Novak, Rosamund Pike and Teresa Gallagher also voice various guest characters.
- Archive audio of Peter Dyneley, voice actor of Jeff Tracy in the original Thunderbirds series, announcing the 5–1 countdown from the title sequence is featured in the remake's titles and during the Thunderbirds' launch sequences.
- David Graham also voiced Parker in the original Thunderbirds series.

=== Japanese dub ===
- Daisuke Namikawa as Scott Tracy
- Eiji Hanawa as Virgil Tracy
- Tetsuya Kakihara as Gordon Tracy
- KENN as John Tracy
- Ayumu Murase as Alan Tracy
- Minako Kotobuki as Kayo Kyrano
- Yōji Ueda as Brains
- Risa Shimizu as Lady Penelope Creighton-Ward
- Hiroshi Iwasaki as Parker

== Production ==
By 2000, Jem Roberts held an interview with Gerry Anderson about a potential revival of the Thunderbirds series. Anderson anticipated that computer graphics would better capture realism. Around this time, a video game adaptation for Game Boy Color was in development.

All scale model miniature effects and CGI for the series was produced at Weta Workshop in New Zealand. The series was executive produced by Estelle Hughes, Giles Ridge, Richard Taylor and Andrew Smith, while David Scott and Theo Baynton act as series director and episode director, respectively. The head writer is Rob Hoegee, while Anthony Cox serves as a film editor and Ben Milsom a production designer.

The production of each episode started with a physical set creation. The sets were created using methods similar to those used in the original series, including the use of household objects as components. A film crew would devise camera setups for scenes to match with the movement and positions of CGI-created characters and crafts that were to be imposed later upon the footage. This also included special effects used on set, such as smoke and air. All CGI sequences were storyboarded before being superimposed onto the live-action footage of the miniatures. Each set was then individually scanned as a 3D print to provide reference for the CGI elements so they could be accurately registered in the environments. Details were then introduced, including textures, craft setup, atmospheric particles and flying debris. The UK-based company Milk VFX was responsible for the final composition.

The music score was composed by brothers Ben and Nick Foster. The revived series's opening theme and certain cues remained faithful to Barry Gray's score for the original series, albeit with a contemporary orchestral style.

== Episodes ==
Series	Episodes		Originally released	
Series	Episodes		First released	Last released
1	26	13	4 April 2015	20 June 2015
1	26	13	31 October 2015	23 January 2016
2	26	13	22 October 2016	7 January 2017
2	26	13	30 September 2017	16 December 2017
3	26	9	31 March 2018	26 May 2018
3	26	9	18 May 2019	13 July 2019
3	26	8	4 January 2020	22 February 2020

== Accolades ==
Year	Award	Category	Recipient	Result
2015	British Academy Children's Awards	BAFTA Kids Vote – Television	Thunderbirds Are Go	Nominated
2016	British Academy Television Craft Awards	Original Music	Ben Foster, Nick Foster	Nominated
2016	British Academy Children's Awards	BAFTA Kids Vote – Television	Thunderbirds Are Go	Nominated

== International broadcasts ==
On 16 June 2014, ITV Studios Global Entertainment sold the rights in a deal with Australia's free-to-air Nine Network (9Go!), who broadcast both the first series, and the second series. The third series was bought by ABC, who premiered it on ABC Me from 2 June 2018.

On 28 April 2015, Tohokushinsha Film Corporation acquired the television and licensing rights for Thunderbirds Are Go. The Japan broadcast for the first series was premiered on NHK (NHK General TV) on 2016-08-05 (as サンダーバード ARE GO), and all three series were premiered on Super! drama TV later. French broadcasts were premiered in September 2015 on Canal J (as Thunderbirds), followed by Gulli later this year (as Thunderbirds), with Nelvana as French licensing agent.

On 10 February 2016, ITV Studios Global Entertainment announced 13 episodes of Thunderbirds Are Go (series 1, split up) would premiere in the United States on Amazon Video on 22 April 2016. The premiere of the second series at Prime Video was also announced. Currently, Series 3 has yet to debut on the service as of 2023.

Canadian broadcasts premiered on CHRGD and Family Channel in April 2016. Taiwan broadcast was premiered in PTS Taiwan on 14 September 2016 (as 新雷鳥神機隊). In Brazil, the show has broadcast on Gloob since 4 July 2016.

The Nordic broadcasts were premiered in SVT (SVT Barnkanalen) in Sweden (as Thunderbirds) since 2015, NRK Super in Norway (as Thunderbirds) since 2015, DR (Ramasjang and Ultra) in Denmark (as Thunderbirds Are Go) since 2015, MTV Juniori in Finland (as Thunderbirds) since 2016, with Alicom appointed as the Nordic licensing agent.

The series was also premiered in TVNZ (TVNZ 2) in New Zealand, Noga in Israel (with LDI as the agent), MBC (MBC3) in pan-Arab (as ثندربيردز انطلق), Amazon Prime in Poland, NPO Zapp in Netherlands, Teletoon+, HBO GO, and Amazon Prime in Poland, Télé-Québec in Canada (as Thunderbirds : Les sentinelles de l'air), ABC in Australia, Ketnet in Flemish Belgium (with License Connection appointed as the agent for Benelux) (as Thunderbirds), Minika TV in Turkey, Gloob in Brazil. The Noga premiere began in summer 2015 on Kids Channel. The TVNZ premiere began on 12 April 2015 on TV2.

China's broadcast was premiered on CCTV-14, starting with the first series on 15 May 2017.

== Marketing ==
Since 2016, ITV Studios Global Entertainment (ITVS GE) is launching consumer products programs for Thunderbirds Are Go at France, Benelux and the Nordics.

Since 2016, Bernard Matthews has released a range of Thunderbird craft shaped turkey.

As part of the second series launch in the UK, a fleet of five ThunderCabs taxis with Thunderbirds vehicle themes (including Thunderbirds 1–4, FAB 1) could be booked between 22 and 23 October 2016 between 9 am and 5 pm via the now-defunct Karhoo app, with rides costing a flat rate of £1 for any journey within central London. All proceeds were donated to The Children's Trust, the UK's leading charity for children with brain injury.

=== Toys ===
On 13 May 2015, ITV Studios Global Entertainment announced its appointment of Vivid as its master toy partner in Europe, Australia and New Zealand. As of Licensing Expo 2014, Vivid Imaginations had master toy licensee with worldwide rights, excluding US and Asia. There are many toys available in the range, including villains, heroes and the mighty Thunderbirds themselves.

On 24 April 2015, ITV Studios Global Entertainment announced that Global Licensing (NZ) Ltd had been appointed as licensing agent for Thunderbirds Are Go in New Zealand. As part of the new deal, Global worked with Vivid Imaginations, the master toy partner for Thunderbirds Are Go, to appoint Planet Fun as the local distributor in New Zealand, which was expected to see toys roll out across the territory from S/S 2015.

The Thunderbirds Are Go master toy line from Vivid Imaginations and distributed by HeadStart was launched in Australia in June 2015. Additional toy rights went to Vivid France and Vivid Holland in respective regions, with Takara Tomy as Japan distributor. The toy launches in France, Benelux and the Nordics began in September 2016, with TOPTOY as pan-Nordic distributor from late summer 2016.

=== App ===
An official Thunderbirds app was launched in October 2015 to accompany the second half of season 1.

An official app was also released on 20 May 2015 as an add-on to the features on the website. This free app is available on both Google Play and Apple's App Store. Behind the Story developed the app.

As of 2015, ITV Studios Global Entertainment and Miniclip planned the release of a Thunderbirds Are Go mobile game(as Thunderbirds Are Go: Team Rush).

=== Magazine ===
An official magazine was published by D. C. Thomson & Co. on 15 October 2015. It features comics, facts, puzzles and more. Each issue includes a free gift. The first six issues had small plastic replicas of Thunderbirds 1–5 and Thunderbird S. After that the gifts were generic front-of-magazine gifts with Thunderbirds Are Go branding, such as notebooks and 'invisible ink' pens.

License Connection became a representative for the brand in the Benelux territories and signed Meis & Maas as master publishing partner to launch a range of books and magazine formats in 2017.

== Home media ==
=== Digital releases ===
All episodes are available to purchase digitally in full 1080p HD on Amazon Video and iTunes.

=== DVD releases ===
Region 2
Series	DVD title	Episodes	Total running time	Release date
1	Volume 1	1–13	286 mins approx	22 June 2015
1	Volume 2	14–26	286 mins approx	1 February 2016
1	Complete Series One	1–26	572 mins approx	1 February 2016
2	Series 2, Volume 1	1–13	286 mins approx	6 February 2017
2	Series 2, Volume 2	14–26 (Note: Episode 21, "Inferno", is not included. It was also banned from transmitting in the UK due to its premise bearing similarities to the Grenfell Tower fire.)	264 mins approx	5 February 2018
3	Series 3, Volume 1	1–13	290 mins approx	9 September 2019
3	Series 3, Volume 2	14–26 (Note: The unaired Series 2 episode "Inferno" is included as a bonus episode.)	312 mins approx	2 March 2020

Region 4
Series	DVD title	Episodes	Total running time	Release date
1	Volume 1	1–7	162 mins approx	24 June 2015
1	Volume 2	8–13	133 mins approx	24 June 2015
1	Volume 3	14–20	162 mins approx	20 January 2016
1	Volume 4	21–26	132 mins approx	3 February 2016
1	Complete Series (Limited Edition)	1–26	574 mins approx	1 June 2016
2	Series 2, Volume 1	1–13	288 mins approx	5 April 2017
2	Series 2, Volume 2	14–26	264 mins approx	7 March 2018

=== Soundtrack releases ===
Series	Soundtrack title	Track count	Total running time	Release date
1	Volume 1 (Original Television Soundtrack) (Note: The track "Thunderbirds March" was released ahead as a single on 29 June 2015.)	57	1:17:20	4 December 2015
1	Volume 2 (Original Television Soundtrack)	52	1:18:09	24 November 2017
1	Legacy (Original Television Soundtrack/The Complete Score)	1	21:05	24 November 2017
2	Series 2 (Original Television Soundtrack)	77	2:23:08	23 August 2019

== See also ==
- List of underwater science fiction works
