= Aloysius Parker =

- Thunderbirds character
- The original puppet character
- First appearance: "Trapped in the Sky" (30 September 1965)
- Created by: Gerry and Sylvia Anderson
- Designed by: John Blundall (puppet sculptor)
- Portrayed by: Ron Cook (2004 film)
- Voiced by: David Graham; Jon Culshaw (2021 audio series)

In-universe information
- Nickname: Nosey
- Occupation: Lady Penelope's butler and chauffeur; International Rescue field agent
- Origin: London, England

Aloysius "Nosey" Parker is a fictional character. Introduced in the British 1960s Supermarionation television series Thunderbirds, he also appears in the film sequels Thunderbirds Are Go (1966) and Thunderbird 6 (1968) and the 2004 live-action adaptation Thunderbirds. He is the butler and chauffeur to Lady Penelope Creighton-Ward and, like her, a field agent of the secret organisation International Rescue.

The puppet character of the TV series and first two films was voiced by David Graham. In the live-action film, Parker is portrayed by Ron Cook. Graham reprised his role for the series Thunderbirds Are Go, which first aired in the UK in 2015.

The character is known for hypercorrecting his Cockney speech and often using the phrase "Yes, M'Lady" to acknowledge Penelope's orders.

== Development ==
Although Lady Penelope and Parker were among the first characters to be developed, neither was conceived as a central character. The inspiration for Parker came from director David Elliott, who had been reading a spy novel about a safecracker who unwittingly becomes a government agent. The character's Cockney speech (dubbed "Parkerese" by Graham and series creator Gerry Anderson) was based on the voice of a wine waiter at the Kings Arms in Cookham, Berkshire, which was regularly visited by members of the crew. Anderson said that Arthur, who was once in the service of Elizabeth II at Windsor Castle, spoke with a "warm patter, dropping his 'aitches' and putting them back in the wrong places, and this intrigued me ... I thought [his] voice would be perfect." He therefore had Graham dine at the establishment to learn the style. Anderson did not inform Arthur of his contribution to Parker's characterisation, worried that he would dislike the public recognition that it might bring if it became widely known.

The look of the character was based mainly on comedian Ben Warriss, a member of the Crazy Gang. John Blundall, who sculpted the puppet, said that he drew inspiration from "typical, clichéd butlers in black-and-white English comedy films", or "small-time crooks, barrow-boy types who wanted to better themselves, and the sort of characters played by Ronald Shiner and Miles Malleson in old movies." He also stated that the facial styling was partly influenced by masks worn in Japanese Noh dance-drama. He said that he designed the character to stand out "just to be bloody-minded, because I wanted to prove that to produce really strong characters in puppets, you need to stylise them and find two or three characteristics to combine and communicate with."

== Original series depiction ==
Parker is employed at Creighton-Ward Mansion by Lady Penelope, serving as her butler and chauffeur (driving FAB 1, a modified, pink Rolls-Royce). Like Penelope, he is an International Rescue field agent. Born in London, Parker speaks with a Cockney accent that features both dropped and inserted H.

Parker is a reformed criminal, having served prison sentences for cat burglary and safe-cracking. His criminal exploits, coupled with a prominent facial feature, earned him the nickname "Nosey" (this may also be a reference to his nosiness – he eavesdrops on his employer's conversations in "Vault of Death" and Thunderbird 6). He was rescued from a life of crime by Penelope, who recruited him as an aide in her espionage activities. Parker's underworld contacts frequently prove useful during the pair's missions (such as in "The Cham-Cham", when he blackmails a talent agent to have an undercover Penelope pass off as a nightclub singer). It is revealed in "The Cham-Cham" that Parker suffers from vertigo. In the episode "The Man from MI.5" it is revealed he still has the temptation to return to his burglar ways as he was caught with a suitcase full of safecracking equipment, much to Penelope's chagrin. Later, he grumbled to himself, "'Ow she wants me to keep my 'and in I don't know," regarding the circumstance.

He is very "old school" in the ways of safecracking, as the equipment consisted of a brick, various wrenches, a bit and brace etc. In "Vault of Death" he is shown to use a stethoscope instead of a modern detector. He stated that it was good enough for his father, his grandfather and his great-grandfather. This implies that cat burglary and safecracking were a family business and probably explains where he got his skills. In the same episode it is revealed Parker knew a fellow burglar nicknamed "light-fingered Fred" when he was in prison and he further claimed that Fred was the only one who could possibly rival him in the skills of his criminal expertise.

It is revealed in the episode "Danger at Ocean Deep" that Parker has an upper-class connoisseur-like taste for fine beverages as he manages to pilfer a bottle of vintage 1998 champagne, right under Penelope's nose no less, and swap it with pure tonic water without her knowing anything. During the launching of the ship he and another fellow chauffeur, a friend named Stevens, share in drinking the entire bottle together. Penelope later finds Parker asleep and hiccuping. A slurring Parker then (drunkenly) reveals his theft. He says he did this on the grounds that it was such a good year it seemed a shame to see it go to waste.

=== Appearances ===
- "Trapped in the Sky"
- "The Perils of Penelope"
- "Day of Disaster"
- "30 Minutes After Noon"
- "Vault of Death"
- "The Mighty Atom"
- "The Impostors"
- "The Man from MI.5"
- "Danger at Ocean Deep"
- "The Duchess Assignment"
- "Brink of Disaster"
- "The Cham-Cham"
- "Atlantic Inferno"
- "Path of Destruction"
- "Alias Mr. Hackenbacker"
- "Lord Parker's 'Oliday"
- Thunderbirds Are Go (film)
- Thunderbird 6 (film)

== Reception and influence ==
Acknowledging Parker's role as a peripheral comic foil, as well as the heavy caricature of the original puppet character, David Garland likens him to the Victorian-era stock character Pantaloon, "a low, comic figure that functioned as a butt of jokes, and did not mix with regular dramatic characters." Series co-creator Sylvia Anderson described Parker as a "lovable rogue with doubtful connections who had gone straight." While speaking as a guest on BBC 6 Music in December 2007, she cast doubt on the assertion that the character's first name was Aloysius, stating that he was "only ever 'Nosey' Parker".

The puppet character is known for his Cockney speech, which he would often hypercorrect by adding non-standard aitches in an attempt to imitate prestigious English. He is also remembered for his frequent use of the expression "Yes, M'Lady" in acknowledging Penelope's instructions—the phrase being so iconic that it was the original title of Sylvia Anderson's autobiography (later changed to "My FAB Years"). Jim Sangster and Paul Condon write that the character's "adenoidal" delivery of this line "became synonymous with the show." They also describe Penelope and Parker as the "best characters in the Anderson collection", stating that the duo "managed to steal every episode they appeared in." Robert Sellers describes Parker and Penelope together as "amongst the most popular and recognisable TV characters ever created".

In 2003 Virgin Trains West Coast named locomotive 57311 Parker. It retained the name when sold to Direct Rail Services in 2013.

== Adaptations ==
In the 2004 live-action film, in which Parker is played by Ron Cook, the character retains his Cockney accent but no longer hypercorrects his words. In an interview, Cook explained that "we thought his tendency to talk posh wasn't really relevant to this day and age."

In the remake series Thunderbirds Are Go, Parker is portrayed more as a capable member of the International Rescue team, with not only above-average intelligence, but also showing physical and acrobatic skill on a number of occasions. He is loyal and obedient to Lady Penelope, but this is obviously the role that he has taken by choice, as he is not afraid to use his own initiative as well.
