= Thunderbirds merchandise =

Products based on the Thunderbirds television series

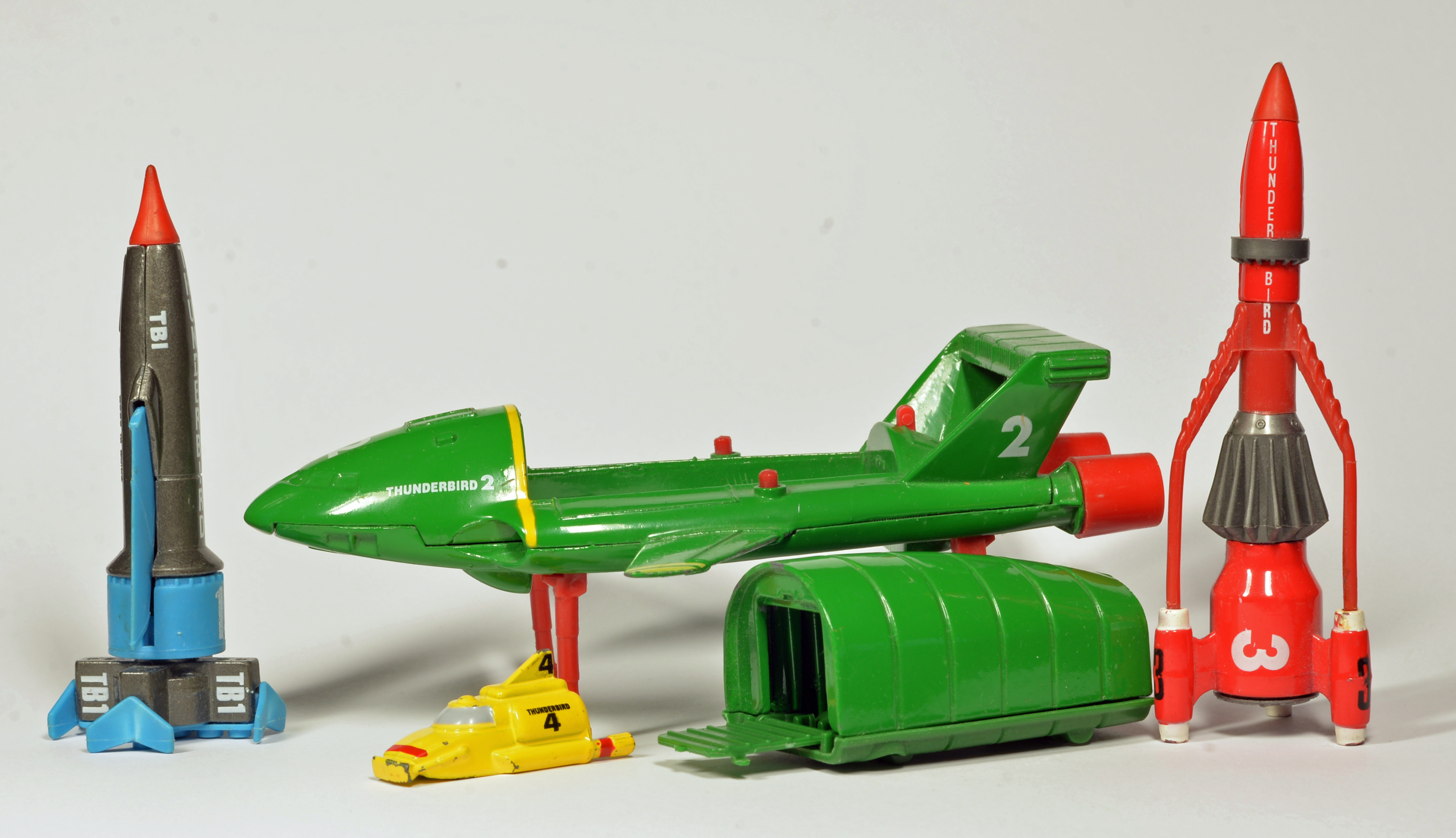
Toy versions of the Thunderbird machines

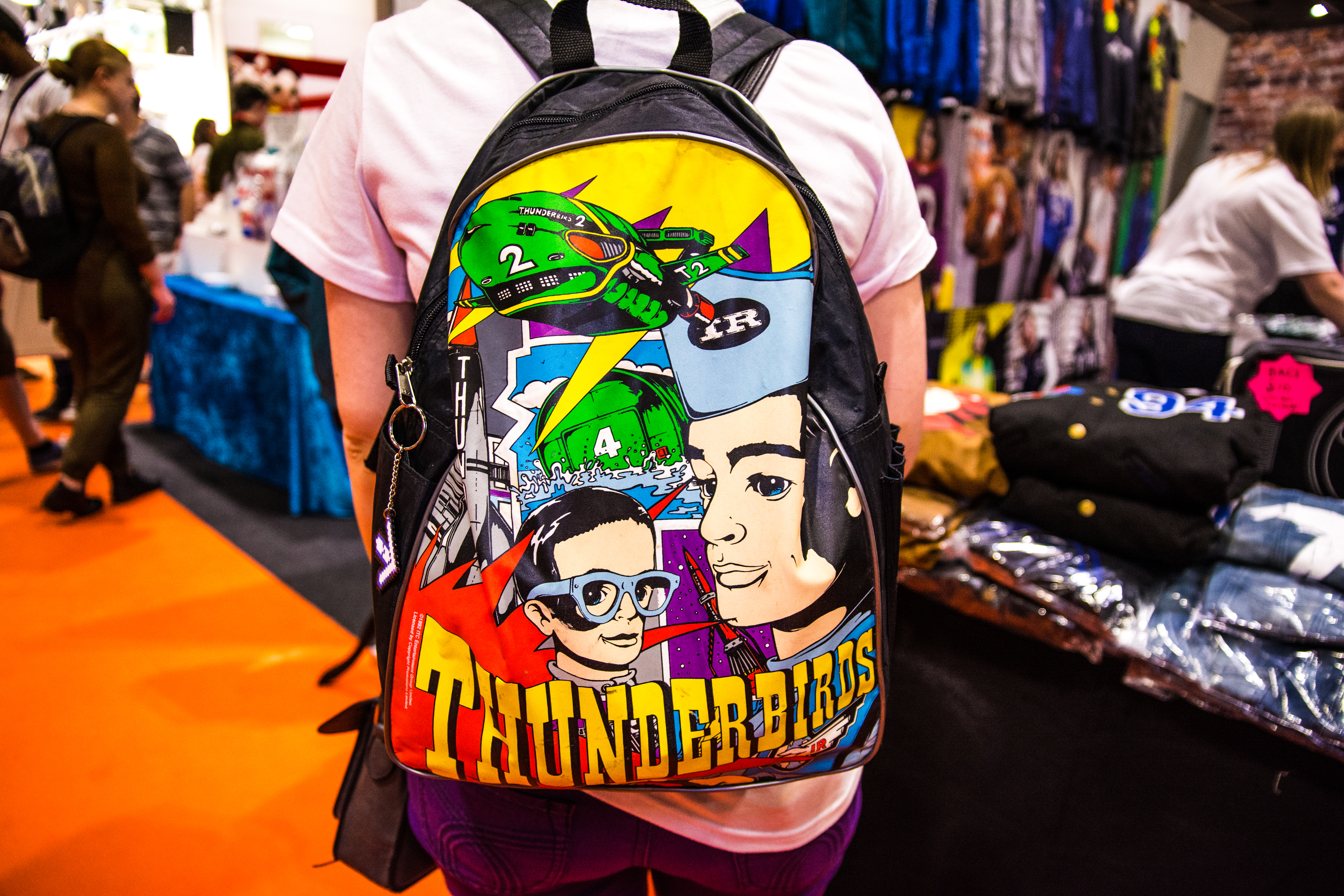
A Thunderbirds backpack

This article discusses tie-ins for Thunderbirds, a British Supermarionation television series created by Gerry and Sylvia Anderson and produced by AP Films (later Century 21 Productions).

Since its first broadcast in 1965, Thunderbirds has generated more than 3,000 tie-in products. These include episode novelisations, children's toys and video games. By 1966, Century 21 had granted merchandise licences to over 120 companies and turnover from these licensees was roughly £6 million (or £98 million in 2025). In 1995, sales in Japan totalled approximately £60 million a year (or £123 million in 2025).

For a discussion of screen and audio adaptations of Thunderbirds, as well as imitations and references in various media, see Works based on Thunderbirds.

== Audio plays ==
From 1965 to 1967, Century 21 Records released 19 Thunderbirds audio plays on 7-inch, 33 RPM, vinyl EP records (promoted as "mini-albums").

== Books ==
Between 1966 and 1967, eight original Thunderbirds novels were written by John William Jennison (four under the pseudonym "John Theydon") and Kevin McGarry. Three of the novels focus on the character of Lady Penelope. In 1992, Corgi Books published four children's novelisations by Dave Morris.

=== Joan Marie Verba ===
In 2008, Minnesota-based FTL Publications, in association with Diamond Comic Distributors, launched a new series of original novels by Joan Marie Verba. Verba had attempted to obtain the licence as early as 2004, while Carlton Television was in the process of merging with ITV Granada. After waiting several months, she contacted Granada, and after three years of discussions FTL Publications was finally granted the licence in 2007. It was the first licence for Thunderbirds titles to be given to an American publisher, and the books constitute the first new, official series of Thunderbirds novels to be written since the 1960s. Countdown to Action, published in June 2008, reveals the founding of International Rescue, exploring the establishment of the organisation and the construction of its machines. The other books highlight the individual Tracy brothers, as well as Brains.

=== List of novels and novelisations ===
Year published	Title	Author	Publisher	ISBN	Plot / Notes
1966	Thunderbirds	"John Theydon" (John W. Jennison)	Armada Books	Unknown	When a mysterious meteorite lands in the Gobi Desert, Scott Tracy and the Hood are overpowered by an extraterrestrial intelligence.; Reprinted as Thunderbirds 1: Thunderbirds in 1989 (Titan Books, ISBN 978-1-85286-160-5).; Reprinted as Thunderbirds: Terror from the Stars in 2021.
1966	Calling Thunderbirds	"John Theydon"	Armada Books	Unknown	Lady Penelope and her cousin are kidnapped by a Peruvian explorer and the Hood, who are both seeking to recover ancient Inca treasure.; Reprinted as Thunderbirds 2: Calling Thunderbirds in 1990 (Titan Books, ISBN 978-1-85286-161-2).
1966	Thunderbirds: Operation Asteroids	John W. Jennison	World Distributors	Unknown	A rescue mission to the Moon is hi-jacked by the Hood; he returns to Earth in Thunderbird 3, holding Lady Penelope, Brains and Tin-Tin hostage and plotting to attack major cities from orbit with nuclear devices.
1966	Thunderbirds: Lost World	John W. Jennison	World Distributors	Unknown	On New Guinea, Scott, Virgil, Gordon and Tin-Tin are abducted by descendants of a lost but scientifically advanced tribe allied with the Hood, who intends to wreak havoc with the natives' anti-gravity technology.
1966	Lady Penelope: Cool for Danger	Kevin McGarry	World Distributors	Unknown	Lady Penelope and Parker are embroiled in the initial stages of a coup in the European state of Revonia, in part triggered by Penelope's arch-enemy Mr Steelman's desire for world domination.
1966	Lady Penelope: A Gallery of Thieves	Kevin McGarry	World Distributors	Unknown	Mr Steelman's latest scheme is to hold the galleries of the world to ransom by stealing unique works of art and replacing them with counterfeits.
1966	Thunderbirds: Ring of Fire	"John Theydon"	Armada Books	Unknown	Following a rescue at a disintegrating nuclear power station, Thunderbird 1 is caught in a volcanic eruption; the nuclear explosion has furthermore opened a fissure in the Earth's crust, threatening widespread destruction.
1966	Thunderbirds Are Go	Angus P. Allan	Armada Books	Unknown	Novelisation of the film Thunderbirds Are Go
1967	Lady Penelope: The Albanian Affair	"John Theydon"	Armada Books; Century 21 Publishing	Unknown	Lady Penelope's mission to pursue a reporter who has photographed the Thunderbirds machines is complicated by the involvement of a criminal organisation intent on selling the images to a rogue Balkan state.
1992	Sun Probe	Dave Morris	Young Corgi	ISBN 978-0-552-52765-1	Novelisation of the TV episode "Sun Probe"
1992	The Uninvited	Dave Morris	Young Corgi	ISBN 978-0-552-52763-7	Novelisation of the TV episode "The Uninvited"
1992	Brink of Disaster	Dave Morris	Young Corgi	ISBN 978-0-552-52764-4	Novelisation of the TV episode "Brink of Disaster"
1992	Atlantic Inferno	Dave Morris	Young Corgi	ISBN 978-0-552-52766-8	Novelisation of the TV episode "Atlantic Inferno"
2008	Countdown To Action!	Joan Marie Verba	FTL Publications	ISBN 978-0-9653575-7-9	The origins of International Rescue. Central character: Jeff Tracy.
2008	Action Alert!	Joan Marie Verba	FTL Publications	ISBN 978-0-9653575-8-6	Central character: Scott Tracy
2009	Deadly Danger!	Joan Marie Verba	FTL Publications	ISBN 978-0-9653575-9-3	Central character: Virgil Tracy
2010	Situation: Critical!	Joan Marie Verba	FTL Publications	ISBN 978-0-9825232-2-3	Central character: John Tracy
2011	Extreme Hazard!	Joan Marie Verba	FTL Publications	ISBN 978-1-936881-01-7	Central character: Gordon Tracy
2012	Danger Zone!	Joan Marie Verba	FTL Publications	ISBN 978-1-936881-08-6	Central character: Alan Tracy
2012	Arctic Adventure	Anthony Taylor	FTL Publications	ISBN 978-0-9825232-5-4	Central character: Brains

== Comics ==
A comic strip featuring the characters of Lady Penelope and Parker, set prior to their joining International Rescue, debuted in the first weekly issues of AP Films Publishing's children's title TV Century 21 in early 1965, several months prior to the first broadcast of "Trapped in the Sky". A full-length "Thunderbirds" strip debuted in the comic's 51st issue, published in January 1966. Originally written by editor and Thunderbirds TV scriptwriter Alan Fennell, this mostly replaced the "Lady Penelope" strip, which moved to a sister comic of the same name. The "Thunderbirds" strip, illustrated by Frank Bellamy, was the centrepiece of TV Century 21 (re-branded TV 21 in January 1968) for 186 issues and 30 serials, until October 1969. At their peak, combined weekly sales of TV Century 21 and Lady Penelope in the 1960s numbered 1.3 million. In 1966, Thunderbirds featured as a strip in the Daily Mail.

A Thunderbirds Annual was published by Century 21 Publishing from 1966 to 1968, and a Lady Penelope version until 1969. Thunderbirds also appeared in the parent TV Century 21/TV 21 annual until 1969; the same year, a joint Captain Scarlet and Thunderbirds annual was released. Starting in October 1991, the Bellamy-illustrated strips, as well as some that had first appeared in Lady Penelope, were reprinted in Fleetway Publications' fortnightly Thunderbirds: The Comic. Again edited by Fennell, this new title had a 30-month publication run and achieved peak sales of 90,000 or 100,000 copies. Reprints had previously appeared in Polystyle Publications' Countdown and Thunderbirds Holiday Special series in the 1970s and 1980s. In 1992, Ravette Books reprinted 13 strips in a graphic album series.

== Games ==
In 1985, the first Thunderbirds video game was released for the Commodore 64 and ZX Spectrum. The player pilots Thunderbird 1 and Thunderbird 2 to explore an Egyptian-style labyrinth. In 1989, Grandslam Entertainment released a game for the Commodore 64 and Amiga, Amstrad CPC, Atari ST, MSX, and ZX Spectrum. A NES version was released by Activision the following year. In 1993, a game for Super Famicom, subtitled Kokusou Kyuujotai Shutsudou Seyo!, was released in Japan. SCi Games published a Game Boy Color title in 2000. The following year, it released a collection of Microsoft Windows themes and screensavers titled "F.A.B Action Pack", as well as Thunderbirds: International Rescue for the Game Boy Advance. In 2004, a second Game Boy Advance title was released by Vivendi Universal Games. A new Thunderbirds video game was released in Europe for the PlayStation 2 in July 2007; the North American release was cancelled.

In 2015, a co-operative Thunderbirds board game, designed by Matt Leacock, was released to coincide with the series' 50th anniversary. The game was published by Modiphius Entertainment and three expansion sets were released in 2016.

== Home video ==
The 1980s and 1990s saw a number of Thunderbirds VHS releases by PolyGram and its subsidiary, Channel 5 Video Distribution. These proved to be a significant commercial success for Channel 5. Due to rights concerns, not all episodes were released unedited; some were issued in the "Super Space Theater" format, for which pairs of thematically similar episodes had been combined to create double-length compilation films for US broadcast syndication. The compilations were: Thunderbirds to the Rescue (combining "Trapped in the Sky" and "Operation Crash-Dive"), Thunderbirds in Outer Space ("Sun Probe" and "Ricochet") and Countdown to Disaster ("Terror in New York City" and "Atlantic Inferno"). The videos opened with a brief introduction by Parker, informing the viewer of other Gerry Anderson video releases. Volume 12 contained a selection of Lyons Maid advertisements featuring characters from the Anderson productions, and Volume 14 a "Making of Thunderbirds" featurette.

Upon its acquisition of the brand in 1999, Carlton International Media commenced work on remastering Thunderbirds for the first Region 2 DVD releases. Dolby 5.1 surround sound was added, and the existing picture and mono sound cleaned up with the aid of digital restoration and noise reduction technology. In addition, the original soundtrack was enhanced with the insertion of new sound effects and background foley (mainly explosions, aircraft and other mechanical noise, and vocal echo).

Region 1 DVDs were released by North American distributor A&E Home Video in 2001, with a "Complete Series" box set following in 2002; it was re-released in slimmer packaging in 2008. The same year, Thunderbirds was released, both in instalments and as a box set, on Blu-ray Disc in the UK. The region-free version distributed in Region B presents episodes in a vertically panned and scanned, 16:9 aspect ratio; a Japanese set, released by Geneon Universal in 2013, restores the original 4:3 picture. In 2015, Timeless Media Group and Shout! Factory (through their deal with ITV) released the complete series on DVD and Blu-ray in the US with the episodes in their original full-screen ratio).

=== UK releases ===
The following is not an exhaustive list.

Title	Contents / Notes	Format	Region	Released
Countdown to Disaster	Compilation of "Terror in New York City" and "Atlantic Inferno"	VHS	—N/a	1982 Precision Video 1986 Channel 5/Polygram
Thunderbirds in Outer Space	Compilation of "Sun Probe" and "Ricochet"	VHS	—N/a	1983 Precision Video 1986 Channel 5/Polygram
Thunderbirds to the Rescue	Compilation of "Trapped in the Sky" and "Operation Crash-Dive"	VHS	—N/a	1981 Precision Video 1986 Channel 5/Polygram
Thunderbirds – Volume 1		VHS / DVD / Blu-ray	2 (DVD); B (Blu-ray)	2000 (VHS); 2000 / 2004 (DVD)
Thunderbirds – Volume 2		VHS / DVD / Blu-ray	2 B	2000 (VHS); 2000 / 2004 (DVD)
Thunderbirds – Volume 3		VHS / DVD / Blu-ray	2 B	2000 (VHS); 2000 / 2004 (DVD)
Thunderbirds – Volume 4		VHS / DVD / Blu-ray	2 B	1986 / 2000 (VHS); 2000 / 2004 (DVD)
Thunderbirds – Volume 5		VHS / DVD / Blu-ray	2 B	1987 / 2001 (VHS); 2000 / 2004 (DVD)
Thunderbirds – Volume 6		VHS / DVD / Blu-ray	2 B	1987 / 2001 (VHS); 2000 / 2004 (DVD)
Thunderbirds – Volume 7		VHS / DVD	2	1987 / 2001 (VHS); 2000 / 2004 (DVD)
Thunderbirds – Volume 8		VHS / DVD	2	1987 / 2001 (VHS); 2000 / 2004 (DVD)
Thunderbirds – The Complete Series		VHS / DVD / Blu-ray	2 (DVD); Free (Blu-ray)	2000 (VHS) 2000 / 2004 / 2008 / 2015 (DVD) 2008 / 2015 / 2026 (Blu-Ray)
The Brains Behind Thunderbirds	Behind-the-scenes feature	VHS	—N/a	2000
Thunderbirds – Volume 9		VHS	—N/a	1988 / 2001
Thunderbirds – Volume 10		VHS	—N/a	1988 / 2001
Thunderbirds – Volume 11		VHS	—N/a	1989 / 2001
Thunderbirds – Volume 12		VHS	—N/a	1989 / 2001
Thunderbirds – Volume 13		VHS	—N/a	1989 / 2001
Thunderbirds – Volume 14		VHS	—N/a	1990 / 2001
Thunderbirds – Volume 15		VHS	—N/a	1990 / 2001
Thunderbirds – Volume 16		VHS	—N/a	1991 / 2001
Thunderbirds: 40th Anniversary	Episodes 1 to 3	UMD	Unknown	2006
HD21 / This is Supermarionation	"Trapped in the Sky", "Terror in New York City" and "Atlantic Inferno"	Blu-ray	B	2014

=== US releases ===
The following is not an exhaustive list.

Title	Format	Region	Released	Distributor
Countdown to Disaster	VHS	—N/a	—N/a	Family Home Entertainment
Thunderbirds in Outer Space	VHS	—N/a	—N/a	Family Home Entertainment
Thunderbirds to the Rescue	VHS	—N/a	—N/a	Family Home Entertainment
Thunderbirds – Volume 1	VHS / DVD	1 (DVD)	2001	A&E Home Video
Thunderbirds – Volume 2	VHS / DVD	1	2001	A&E Home Video
Thunderbirds – Set 3	VHS / DVD	1	2001	A&E Home Video
Thunderbirds – Set 4	VHS / DVD	1	2001	A&E Home Video
Thunderbirds – Set 5	DVD	1	2002	A&E Home Video
Thunderbirds – Set 6	DVD	1	2002	A&E Home Video
Thunderbirds – Megaset	DVD	1	2002	A&E Home Video
The Best of Thunderbirds	DVD	1	2004	A&E Home Video
Thunderbirds – 40th Anniversary Collector's Edition Megaset	DVD	1	2008	A&E Home Video
Thunderbirds – The Complete Series	DVD / Blu-ray	1 (DVD); A (Blu-ray)	2015	Timeless Media Group; Shout! Factory

== Music ==
The first Thunderbirds-exclusive music record was the mini-album Great Themes from Thunderbirds, published by Century 21 Records in 1967. Two soundtrack albums were released by Silva Screen Records, to favourable reviews by AllMusic and Uncut magazine, in 2003 and 2004. A 40th-anniversary release – the double album The Best of Thunderbirds – was released in 2005. In 2015, Fanderson released a four-disc limited-edition set exclusively for its members in celebration of the 50th anniversary; it contains music either written for, or used in, all but one episode ("Cry Wolf", which contains no original or exclusive music).

Beyond the TV series, composer Barry Gray's contributions to Thunderbirds included four original songs recorded exclusively for audio release: "Lady Penelope", "Parker", "Parker Well Done" and "The Abominable Snowman", all sung in character by Sylvia Anderson and David Graham.

=== Soundtrack releases ===
==== Great Themes from Thunderbirds (1967) ====
Great Themes from Thunderbirds

EP
- Released: January 1967
- Recorded: 1 September 1966; Pye Studios, London
- Label: Century 21 Records

Side 1
No.	Title	Notes	Length
1.	"That Dangerous Game"	From "The Cham-Cham"
2.	"Joie de Vivre"	From "The Perils of Penelope"
3.	"Let's Play Ad-Lib"	From "The Cham-Cham"

Side 2
No.	Title	Notes	Length
1.	"The Man from MI.5"	From "The Man from MI.5"
2.	"San Martino"	From "Path of Destruction"
3.	"Jeremiah"	From "The Impostors"

==== Thunderbirds (Original Television Soundtrack) (2003–2004) ====
===== Volume 1 =====
Thunderbirds (Original Television Soundtrack) Volume 1

Soundtrack album
- Released: 24 February 2003 (UK); 25 March 2003 (US)
- Recorded: 8 December 1964 – 10 February 1967
- Label: Silva Screen Records

Professional ratings
Review scores
Source	Rating
AllMusic website	4/5 stars
Uncut magazine	4/5 stars

No.	Title	Notes	Length
1.	"Main Titles"	Stock track	1:36
2.	"Sun Probe"	From "Sun Probe"	2:05
3.	"Tracy Island and International Rescue"	Stock track	1:10
4.	"Monorail to Disaster"	From "The Perils of Penelope"	2:10
5.	"Thunderbirds Are Go!"	Stock track	4:28
6.	"Dangerous Game – Latin Rhythm Instrumental"	From "The Cham-Cham"	2:08
7.	"Suite from 'Vault of Death'"	From "Vault of Death"	8:47
8.	"The Man from MI.5"	From "The Man from MI.5"	4:28
9.	"Suite from 'Desperate Intruder'"	From "Desperate Intruder"	7:27
10.	"Commercial Break"	With material from Thunderbirds Lyons Maid adverts	2:46
11.	"Dangerous Game" (Lyrical)	From "The Cham-Cham". Sung by Sylvia Anderson as Lady Penelope.	1:51
12.	"Let's Play Ad-Lib"	From "The Cham-Cham"	2:20
13.	"Lady Penelope on the Move/Suite from 'Pit of Peril'"	From Thunderbirds Are Go (first part)	1:37
14.	"The Fate of the Sidewinder"	From "Pit of Peril"	2:01
15.	"Pit of Peril"	From "Pit of Peril"	2:49
16.	"Rescue!"	From "Pit of Peril"	2:04
17.	"Jeremiah and Lady Penelope"	From "The Impostors"	2:06
18.	"Deadly Plot – The Hood and the Fireflash"	From "Trapped in the Sky"	4:09
19.	"Fireflash Landing"	From "Trapped in the Sky"	1:15
20.	"FAB 1 Pursuit"	From "Trapped in the Sky"	1:00
21.	"The Tracy Lounge Piano"	From "Trapped in the Sky"	2:00
22.	"End Titles"	Stock track	1:09
Total length:			1:01:25

===== Volume 2 =====
Thunderbirds (Original Television Soundtrack) Volume 2

Soundtrack album
- Released: 10 August 2004 (US)
- Recorded: 8 December 1964 – 6 November 1965
- Label: Silva Screen Records

Professional ratings
Review scores
Source	Rating
AllMusic website	4/5 stars
Starburst magazine	5/5 stars
Uncut magazine	4/5 stars

No.	Title	Notes	Length
1.	"Main Titles"	Stock track	1:25
2.	"Danger at Ocean Deep"	Suite from "Danger at Ocean Deep"	2:17
3.	"Spoke City Jazz"	From "30 Minutes After Noon"	1:39
4.	"Easy Listening Radio Music"	From "30 Minutes After Noon"	1:17
5.	"Drama on the South East Asia Pass"	From "End of the Road"	5:22
6.	"Taking a Desperate Chance"	From "End of the Road"	3:25
7.	"Thunderbirds To The Rescue"	From "End of the Road"	2:40
8.	"Penelope in France"	From "The Perils of Penelope", "The Duchess Assignment" and "Alias Mr. Hackenbacker"	4:02
9.	"Elegance, Charm and Deadly Danger"	From "The Perils of Penelope" and "Alias Mr. Hackenbacker"	2:52
10.	"Dangerous Game" (Lyrical)	From "The Cham-Cham". Sung by Jack Clegg.	1:39
11.	"Century 21 March"	Stock track	2:01
12.	"Space Observatory 3 Space FX"	From "The Impostors"	2:02
13.	"San Martino"	From "Path of Destruction"	2:47
14.	"The Noon Day Sun"	From "Move – and You're Dead"	1:15
15.	"New York City Lights"	From "The Duchess Assignment"	0:56
16.	"The Duchess"	From "The Duchess Assignment"	0:35
17.	"World Exclusive Foiled!"	From "Terror in New York City"	1:38
18.	"Moving the Empire State Building"	From "Terror in New York City"	3:31
19.	"The Rescue of Ned Cook"	From "Terror in New York City"	2:33
20.	"Dangerous Game" (Piano)	From "The Cham-Cham". Performed by Barry Gray.	2:08
21.	"Lady Penelope and the Mouse"	From "The Mighty Atom"	1:11
22.	"Journey of the Martian Space Probe"	From "Day of Disaster"	1:32
23.	"Coralville Surprise/The Bank Job"	From "Give or Take a Million"	3:41
24.	"Christmas on Tracy Island"	From "Give or Take a Million"	4:01
25.	"Sleepy Time"	From "Security Hazard"	0:46
26.	"End Titles"	Stock track	1:07
27.	"Flying High" (Bonus track)	Unused end theme sung by Gary Miller	1:25
Total length:			1:00:05

==== The Best of Thunderbirds (2005) ====
The Best of Thunderbirds

Soundtrack album
- Released: 14 November 2005
- Label: Silva Screen Records

Disc 1
No.	Title	Notes	Length
1.	"Main Titles"	From "Trapped in the Sky"	1:31
2.	"Deadly Plot – The Hood and the Fireflash"	From "Trapped in the Sky"	3:45
3.	"Thunderbirds Are Go!"	From "Trapped in the Sky"	4:26
4.	"Fireflash Landing"	From "Trapped in the Sky"	1:14
5.	"FAB 1 Pursuit"	From "Trapped in the Sky"	0:59
6.	"The Tracy Lounge Piano"	From "Trapped in the Sky"	1:58
7.	"World Exclusive Foiled!"	From "Terror in New York City"	1:38
8.	"Moving the Empire State Building"	From "Terror in New York City"	3:32
9.	"The Rescue of Ned Cook"	From "Terror in New York City"	2:33
10.	"Spoke City Jazz"	From "30 Minutes After Noon"	1:39
11.	"Easy Listening Radio Music"	From "30 Minutes After Noon"	1:17
12.	"Suite from 'Desperate Intruder'"	From "Desperate Intruder"	7:29
13.	"Jeremiah's Theme" (Alternative)	From "The Impostors"	2:02
14.	"Martian Space Probe"	From "Day of Disaster"	1:32
15.	"Stand By For Lift Off"	From "Sun Probe"	1:59
16.	"Penelope in France"	From "The Perils of Penelope"	4:04
17.	"San Martino" (Stereo)	From "Path of Destruction"	2:48
18.	"Drama on the South East Asia Pass"	From "End of the Road"	5:22
19.	"Taking A Desperate Chance"	From "End of the Road"	3:25
20.	"Thunderbirds to the Rescue"	From "End of the Road"	2:39
21.	"Jazz Atlantica"	From "Atlantic Inferno"	1:01
22.	"Suite from 'Vault of Death'" (Edited)	From "Vault of Death"	5:28
23.	"The Red Arrow"	From "Edge of Impact"	3:18
24.	"The Voyage of Ocean Pioneer 1"	From "Danger at Ocean Deep"	2:17
25.	"Espionage on the French Riviera" (Edited)	From "The Man from MI.5"	2:49
26.	"The Fate of the Sidewinder"	From "Pit of Peril"	2:00
27.	"Pit of Peril"	From "Pit of Peril"	2:49
28.	"Rescue!"	From "Pit of Peril"	1:58
29.	"End Titles" (Revised)	From "Pit of Peril"	1:25

Disc 2
No.	Title	Notes	Length
1.	"Parker"	From Lady Penelope Themes. Sung by Sylvia Anderson as Penelope.	3:16
2.	"Lady Penelope"	From Lady Penelope Themes. Sung by David Graham as Parker.	2:58
3.	"Dangerous Game" (Lyrical, stereo)	From "The Cham-Cham". Sung by Anderson as Penelope.	3:53
4.	"Let's Play Ad-Lib" (Stereo)		2:56
5.	"The Abominable Snowman"	From audio episode "F.A.B.". Sung by Anderson and Graham as Penelope and Parker.	1:32
Total length:			1:33:32

==== Thunderbirds (2015, Fanderson) ====
Disc 1
No.	Title	Notes	Length
1.	"Thunderbirds Main Titles – 'Trapped in the Sky' Version"	Exclusive to this episode	1:33
2.	"The Maiden Flight"	From "Trapped in the Sky"	4:33
3.	"The First Rescue Mission"	From "Trapped in the Sky"	4:37
4.	"The Elevator Cars"	From "Trapped in the Sky"	6:43
5.	"The Radiation Cloud"	From "The Mighty Atom"	3:03
6.	"The Power of the Atom"	From "The Mighty Atom"	1:54
7.	"Paris in the Springtime"	From "The Perils of Penelope"	7:24
8.	"The Road To Anderbad"	From "The Perils of Penelope"	1:28
9.	"The Anderbad Tunnel"	From "The Perils of Penelope"	3:26
10.	"Let The Fireworks Begin"	From "The Perils of Penelope"	5:29
11.	"Driving Home"	From "30 Minutes After Noon"	2:29
12.	"Room 1972"	From "30 Minutes After Noon"	1:57
13.	"Chasing The News"	From "Terror in New York City"	3:33
14.	"The Fall of the Empire State"	From "Terror in New York City"	5:00
15.	"Voyage To New York"	From "Terror in New York City"	1:39
16.	"Swim For Your Life"	From "Terror in New York City"	6:33
17.	"San Martino"	From "Path of Destruction"	2:47
18.	"The Ocean Pioneer"	Stock music from Thunderbirds and Stingray	4:23
19.	"Home And Dry"	From "Danger at Ocean Deep"	0:32
20.	"An Explosive Combination"	Stock music from Thunderbirds and Stingray	2:36
21.	"Into the Mist"	Stock music from Thunderbirds and Stingray	5:21
22.	"End Titles – 'Trapped in the Sky' Version"	Exclusive to this episode	1:09

Disc 2
No.	Title	Notes	Length
1.	"Thunderbirds Main Titles"	Standard version	1:32
2.	"Jungle Invader"	From "Pit of Peril"	5:36
3.	"Mission To Hell"	From "Pit of Peril"	1:32
4.	"The Danger Zone"	From "Pit of Peril"	4:07
5.	"The Recovery Vehicles"	From "Pit of Peril"	5:42
6.	"Cops And Robbers"	Stock music from Supercar	0:37
7.	"Bang on Schedule"	From "End of the Road"	6:15
8.	"Eddie's Monsoon"	From "End of the Road"	4:32
9.	"On The Edge"	From "End of the Road"	3:55
10.	"Roadside Recovery"	From "End of the Road"	5:54
11.	"Monte Bianco"	Stock music from Supercar and Stingray	2:04
12.	"Thunderbirds Are Go"	From "Lord Parker's 'Oliday". Also released as a 7" single.	2:32
13.	"The Red Arrow"	From "Edge of Impact"	5:29
14.	"Collision Course"	From "Edge of Impact"	2:06
15.	"Tower of Terror"	From "Edge of Impact"	1:23
16.	"Down To Earth"	From "Edge of Impact"	3:10
17.	"Braquasso's Blue Period"	From "The Duchess Assignment"	0:41
18.	"Caravan To Anasta"	From "Desperate Intruder"	4:49
19.	"The Lost Temple of Anasta"	From "Desperate Intruder"	4:28
20.	"Commercial Break"	Used for the 1965–1980 UK repeats	0:06
21.	"A Veritable Swarm"	From "Desperate Intruder"	1:55
22.	"The Treasure of the Kings"	From "Desperate Intruder"	8:41
23.	"Thunderbirds End Titles"	Standard version	1:22

Disc 3
No.	Title	Notes	Length
1.	"Thunderbirds Main Titles (Stereo FX)"		1:33
2.	"The Bank Job"	From "Vault of Death"	7:01
3.	"The Road To Nowhere"	From "Vault of Death"	3:11
4.	"Thunderbirds Launch"	From "Vault of Death"	4:40
5.	"Going Underground"	From "Vault of Death"	7:07
6.	"The Pyramid of Khamandides"	Stock music from Thunderbirds and Stingray	2:48
7.	"Countdown"	From "Sun Probe"	2:14
8.	"Heading for the Sun"	From "Sun Probe"	1:42
9.	"The Safety Room"	From "Sun Probe"	2:36
10.	"The Wrong Box"	From "Sun Probe"	1:03
11.	"The Test Crew"	Stock music from Thunderbirds and Four Feather Falls	5:26
12.	"Under The Wing"	Stock music from Thunderbirds, Stingray and Four Feather Falls	1:34
13.	"Christmas Preparations"	Stock music from Thunderbirds, Stingray and Supercar	1:47
14.	"The Santa Claus Bank Robbery"	From "Give or Take a Million"	3:36
15.	"Agent 47"	From "The Impostors"	4:20
16.	"Spacewalk"	From "The Impostors"	2:11
17.	"Forward Thrust"	From "The Impostors"	4:52
18.	"Back in Business"	From "The Impostors"	5:46
19.	"Rogue Gyropedo"	Stock music from Thunderbirds and Stingray	2:01
20.	"The Monte Carlo Affair"	From "The Man from MI.5"	5:43
21.	"The Girl from FAB"	From "The Man from MI.5"	2:00
22.	"The Property of a Lady"	From "The Man from MI.5"	0:52
23.	"Second Rendezvous"	From "The Man from MI.5"	1:56
24.	"Flying High (Thunderbirds End Titles Song)"	Unused end theme sung by Gary Miller	1:16

Disc 4
No.	Title	Notes	Length
1.	"Thunderbirds Main Titles (Music Only)"		1:23
2.	"The Bridge of San Miguel"	From "Move – and You're Dead"	2:36
3.	"Parola Sands"	From "Move – and You're Dead"	0:43
4.	"Target: Alan Tracy"	From "Move – and You're Dead"	1:20
5.	"Holding On"	From "Move – and You're Dead"	1:59
6.	"The Jewel Thieves"	Stock music from Thunderbirds and Stingray	0:48
7.	"The Boatman and the Swamp Monsters"	Stock music from Thunderbirds and Stingray	2:48
8.	"Invaders From Mars"	Stock music	2:28
9.	"Flight of the Hood"	Stock music from Supercar	1:01
10.	"Live from Paradise Peaks"	From "The Cham-Cham"	5:58
11.	"Dangerous Liaisons"	From "The Cham-Cham"	6:05
12.	"Happy Skiing"	From "The Cham-Cham"	2:01
13.	"Dangerous Game"	From "The Cham-Cham". Sung by Sylvia Anderson.	6:34
14.	"Penelope's Secret"	From "Alias Mr. Hackenbacker"	1:33
15.	"After A Fashion"	From "Alias Mr. Hackenbacker"	2:46
16.	"The Penelon Collection"	Stock music from Thunderbirds and Stingray	3:34
17.	"A Revolutionary Invention"	Stock music	1:27
18.	"All the Way with KLA (Shram Shram/Flying High)"	From "Ricochet"	2:35
19.	"March of the Probe Rocket"	From "Day of Disaster"	10:15
20.	"Brains to the Rescue"	From "Day of Disaster"	0:36
21.	"The Dock Cranes"	From "Day of Disaster"	3:59
22.	"Cutting It Fine"	Stock music from Thunderbirds and Stingray	6:13
23.	"Bedtime for Chip"	From "Security Hazard"	1:07
24.	"Thunderbirds End Titles"		1:16
Total length:			5:06:31

== Toys ==
When Thunderbirds was first broadcast, AP Films Merchandising awarded licences to companies including Matchbox and Dinky to manufacture plastic and die-cast toy vehicles. It issued approximately 120 such licences, even buying a company (J. Rosenthal) to keep up with demand. Among Dinky's first releases were a six-inch-long (15 cm) FAB 1 (of which more than two million were made) and Thunderbird 2 (some of which were blue instead of green); these two toys continued to be produced until 1976 and 1979, respectively. By 1966, commentators had dubbed the end-of-year shopping season "Thunderbirds Christmas" in the light of the series' popularity.

TV advert for Matchbox's Tracy Island, highly sought after in the early 1990s

Japanese model kits of the vehicles continued to be marketed into the 1980s. In the early 1990s, Matchbox launched a new range of toys to coincide with the series' revival on the BBC. Sales in the run-up to Christmas 1991 suffered when demand overwhelmed supply. However, by Christmas 1992, the series had provided manufacturers and retailers with the most successful UK merchandising campaign since Star Wars. Matchbox's Tracy Island playset quickly became the UK's most sought-after toy, resulting in stock shortages, fights in shops, and a black market for the item; the story was reported in the national press. The 1991 Matchbox range included:

- Tracy Island Electronic Playset – with sounds and moveable palm trees. The stock shortage caused by this item's popularity was reported on BBC News.
- Electronic Thunderbird 1 – with mechanised wings, firing light and sound
- Electronic Thunderbird 2 – with sounds and miniature Thunderbird 4
- Die-cast Thunderbirds 1 to 4 and FAB 1 – were also available in commemorative packaging as a Radio Times exclusive
- Pullback-action toys – Thunderbirds 1, 2 and 4
- Thunderbird 2 pod vehicles – the Mole, Firefly and Recovery Vehicle; all compatible with the electronic Thunderbird 2
- Action figures – Tracy brothers, Jeff Tracy, Brains, the Hood, Lady Penelope and Parker
- Tracy brother dolls

Vivid Imaginations' Tracy Island

In 1993, the BBC children's programme Blue Peter broadcast a making-of showing viewers how to build their own Tracy Island out of "old newspaper, pipe cleaners, yoghurt pots, cereal packets and bits of sponge". Demand for a free instruction sheet detailing the process was so high that the BBC stopped sending the sheets out and released presenter Anthea Turner's demonstration, titled "Blue Peter Makes a Thunderbirds Tracy Island", on home video.

When the BBC repeated Captain Scarlet and the Mysterons in the early 2000s, the Thunderbirds toy licence was re-issued to Vivid Imaginations, who produced a new range for the series' second BBC revival in 2000. The 2000 Vivid Imaginations range included:

- Tracy Island Soundtech Electronic Playset – with 12 sounds
- Tracy Island Powertech Transforming Playset – with vehicle hangars and sounds
- Thunderbirds 1 to 4 Soundtech Electronic Playsets – with miniature figures and sounds
- Action Adventure Set – to scale with the Thunderbird 2 playset, featuring the Mole, Firefly, the Hood's submarine and six figures
- Thunderbirds 1 to 5, FAB 1 and the Mole
- Action figures and dolls

The release of the live-action film, Thunderbirds, in 2004 prompted renewed interest in Thunderbirds toys. The film tie-ins were produced by Bandai. For the series' 40th anniversary in 2005, some items from the Vivid range were re-released in different packaging. The following decade, Vivid produced a new line of toys for the remake series Thunderbirds Are Go. As of 2019, Thunderbirds Are Go toys are distributed by Bandai in the UK, Modern Brands in Australia and Planet Fun in New Zealand.

== Art ==
As part of the activities surrounding the 50th anniversary of the TV show, ITV invited the pop art brand Art & Hue to create a new print collection based on Thunderbirds.

The first annual "International Thunderbirds Day" was celebrated on 30 September 2017, the 52nd anniversary of the series' debut. To mark the event, the InterContinental London – The O2 hotel offered a "Lady Penelope Afternoon tea" from 15 September until 30 October at which the pop art prints were exhibited.
