= Thunderbirds 2086 =

Japanese anime television series

- Title card

科学救助隊テクノボイジャー
- Genre: Action, science fiction
- Anime television series
- Directed by: Kimio Ikeda
- Produced by: Shinji Nakagawa; Tokizō Tsuchiya; Banjiro Uemura
- Music by: Kentarō Haneda; Kouji Makaino
- Studio: Jin Productions
- Licensed by: UK: ITC Entertainment
- Original network: FNS (Fuji Television)
- English network: UK: BBC1; US: Showtime
- Original run: 17 April 1982 – 11 September 1982
- Episodes: 24

Thunderbirds 2086 is the English-dubbed version of the Japanese anime series Scientific Rescue Team Technoboyger (科学救助隊テクノボイジャー), loosely inspired by the original Gerry Anderson Supermarionation series Thunderbirds. The English dub was produced by ITC Entertainment, the original production company for Thunderbirds, although Gerry Anderson and Sylvia Anderson were not involved.

The series includes music and sound effects from Thunderbirds and Anderson's other series: Stingray, Captain Scarlet and the Mysterons, Joe 90, UFO, and Space: 1999. A total of 24 episodes were produced, but only 18 were broadcast on Fuji TV in 1982.

== Premise ==
The series takes place in 2086 and chronicles the adventures of a rescue team called the "Thunderbirds" ("TechnoBoyager" in the Japanese version, a mistranslated portmanteau of "technology" and "voyager"), who work for the International Rescue Organization (IRO). In the Japanese version, the two entities are the same.

Unlike the original Thunderbirds, in which the International Rescue organization was small-scale and family-run, Thunderbirds 2086 depicts it as a vast organization with numerous branches controlled by the Federation, the series' equivalent of the United Nations. Although, the English version is called Thunderbirds 2086, the Tracy family, who ran International Rescue in the original series, are not mentioned. In the English version, "Thunderbirds" refers to the team, while in the original series, it merely refers to their vehicles. The animated series otherwise has notable similarities to the original, with most episodes revolving around a natural or man-made disaster that the Thunderbirds team must investigate and help resolve.

Similar to the original show, the team's headquarters is an island in the Pacific, known as "Arcology". Its main building is a huge pyramid containing an entire city inside. Like the original International Rescue, a space station in orbit is maintained to monitor mayday calls; in this series, the space station is Thunderbird 6. Both Arcology and TB-6 are home to thousands of people.

Unlike the original series, Thunderbirds 2086 also has an ongoing story arc revolving around a breakaway independence group known as the Shadow Axis, led by the mysterious Star Crusher. There is a strong suggestion in the series that Star Crusher is not human and may be some kind of alien.

=== Vehicles and characters ===
Thunderbird 2086 features 17 vehicles, each with different characteristics and purpose. Each craft's name contains the abbreviated designation "TB", which stands for "TechnoBoyager" in the Japanese version and "Thunderbird" in the English version.

The vehicles are described to a party of school children visiting Arcology in the episode "Child's Play" (except TB-8, 11, 14 (mentioned only), 15, and 16). The remaining vehicles are shown in the 1983 Thunderbirds 2086 annual.

- TB-1/Thunderbird 1 is an aircraft similar in design to the Space Shuttle. It can fly in space and combine with TB-2 and TB-3 to form a larger vessel. It is piloted by Captain Dylan Beyda (who is from Japan).
- TB-2/Thunderbird 2 is a large cargo hauler identical in purpose to the original series' Thunderbird 2 (though blue instead of green in colour). It stores the smaller interchangeable vehicles inside its cargo bay, rather than with hangar pods. Pods are used for large vehicles (notably TB-5) and are carried at the rear of the vehicle between the engines, with TB-2 landing vertically when carrying a pod. TB-2 has space flight capabilities and is piloted by Captain Jesse Eric Rigel Jones (who is from Texas) and Captain Jonathon Samuel Jordan Edkins Jr. (who is from New York and of Jamaican descent).
- TB-3/Thunderbird 3 is an APC-like mobile command center used to monitor situations on the ground. It can split in half and merge with TB-1 and TB-2 for transportation to remote parts of the world and is capable of short rocket hops. It is piloted by Captain Grant Hanson (the same name in the Japanese version, but without the "t"), the oldest and most senior ranking of the Thunderbirds (who is from Germany).
- TB-4/Thunderbird 4 is a yellow submarine, similar to but larger than its original series counterpart. It is too large to be carried by TB-2 and usually makes its way to the disaster area after being directly launched from the Arcology. It is piloted by Captain Catherine Kallan Heyward James, the only female crew member of the Thunderbirds team.
- TB-5/Thunderbird 5 is a large ground-tunneling vehicle reminiscent of the original series' pod vehicle known as the Mole. However, TB-5 is much larger. It is carried into missions by TB-2.
- TB-6/Thunderbird 6 is the largest Thunderbird, a massive space station that serves a similar purpose to the original series' Thunderbird 5. TB-6 is crewed by hundreds if not thousands of IRO personnel and is described as a floating city.
- TB-7/Thunderbird 7 is a one-person fast interceptor aircraft that can be stored either inside TB-1 or TB-2 and used as a drone when required.
- TB-8/Thunderbird 8 is only seen in one episode and is shown carried inside TB-1 and capable of drone operation. The 1983 Annual lists it as the uncrewed Computer Controlled Air Transport, stored on TB-1 and used for disposal of dangerous materials.
- TB-9/Thunderbird 9 is a walker-robot used for repair and upgrade work. It is always carried by another craft.
- TB-10/Thunderbird 10 is an exceptionally fast spacecraft that can reach speeds of over Mach 176 and is used for rapid travel from Earth to other planets.
- TB-11/Thunderbird 11 is an armored high-speed ground vehicle carried aboard TB-3. Although never shown or referenced in the show, it is shown in the 1983 Annual. It is listed as being 5 meters long, weighing one ton, capable of 370 km/h, and equipped with computer-controlled sensors and an array of weapons.
- TB-12/Thunderbird 12 is a bulldozer-like vehicle that can move hefty weights with an extending platform, similar in design to the original series of elevator cars. It is also capable of operating underwater.
- TB-13/Thunderbird 13 is a smaller submarine that is carried inside TB-4 and deployed to reach places too small for TB-4 to travel. It is capable of 60 knots in the water. Although never shown on screen, it is stated in the episode "Child's Play" to be capable of flying at speeds of up to Mach 1.
- TB-14/Thunderbird 14 never appears but is also referenced in "Child's Play". It is a deep-water bathyscaphe capable of travelling far below crush depth, carried aboard TB-4.
- TB-15/Thunderbird 15 is a small tracked vehicle stored inside TB-3 or TB-5 and capable of drone operation. It is listed in the 1983 Annual as a Mobile Computer and can be crewed or uncrewed as required.
- TB-16/Thunderbird 16 is The Mole, carried aboard TB-3 or TB-5 as required and virtually identical to the original series vehicle. The only difference is that TB-16 is uncrewed (according to the 1983 Annual) and capable of operating underwater.
- TB-17/Thunderbird 17 is a huge spacecraft that is bigger than any other Thunderbird except TB-6, where it spends most of its time docked. TB-17 is used for extended operations away from Earth and can store all of the other Thunderbirds (apart from TB-6) inside it.

Commander Jared Simpson (same name in the Japanese version) is the commanding officer of the team and gives the heroes their missions. He is the "Jeff Tracy" figure of the animated series. He has a nephew, Skipper Simpson (named Paul in the Japanese version), a young boy who idolizes the Thunderbirds and hopes to one day join their ranks. Grant Hanson is the senior captain in charge of the whole group.

== Voice cast ==
=== Japanese voice cast ===
- Hiroko Maruyama as Pawl
- Junichi Takeoka as Hidaka Raiji
- Kei Tomiyama as Eric Joans
- Kiyoshi Kobayashi as Gerald Simpson
- Manami Ito as Catharine Hayward
- Ryusei Nakao as Sammy Edkins Jr.
- Takeshi Aono as Grant Hansen

=== English-language voice cast ===
- Alexander Marshall as Jesse Rigel
- Earl Hammond as Jared Simpson & Gran Hanson
- Henry Mandell as Jonathan Jordan Jr.
- John Bellucci as Dylan Beyda
- Keith Mandell as Skipper
- Lucy Martin as Kallan James
- Eleanor Kearney
- Joan Audiberti
- Maia Danziger
- Paolo Audiberti
- Peter Fernandez

== Episodes ==
The original run of Thunderbirds 2086 in Japan was cancelled after only eighteen of its twenty-four episodes aired in 1982. The remaining six episodes were finally aired during a 2008 rerun on the Home Drama Channel.

In total, only three countries broadcast the show in its entirety: the United States in 1983, Australia in 1984, and Malaysia in 1985. The 1986 broadcast in the United Kingdom fared worse than the original Japanese broadcast, being cancelled after only thirteen episodes aired. Around 1985, Spain aired Spanish dubs of four episodes under the title Pájaros Trueno 2086.

| No. | Title | Directed by | Written by | Original release date | Prod. code |
|---|---|---|---|---|---|
| 1 | "Shockwave" | Yasuo Hasegawa | Takayuki Kase | 17 April 1982 | 01 |
The Thunderbirds must save a space bus full of children after an explosion at a power station, but problems arise when underwater missiles are launched for "Operation Shockwave", leaving Dylan, Kallen, Jesse, and Little John to use Thunderbirds 7 and 8 to disable the missiles.
| 2 | "Cloudburst" | Katsuhito Akiyama | Takayuki Kase | 24 April 1982 | 02 |
After a meteor shower damages a weather satellite in the South Pacific, massive storms explode all over the ocean. The Thunderbirds have to act fast to evacuate and rescue the heavily populated islands in peril.
| 3 | "Firefall" | Hiromichi Matano | Kazuo Yoshioka | 1 May 1982 | 03 |
International Rescue sets out into space to rescue the captain of the space colony Rosa-Dante, which leads Dylan to recall memories of when his friend once saved his life.
| 4 | "Fear Factor" | Tatsuya Kasahara | Fumio Ishimori | 8 May 1982 | 04 |
The Thunderbirds encounter a scientist and his alienated son, who suffers from fear of being in space.
| 5 | "Fault Line" | Yasuo Hasegawa | Akira Nakahara | 15 May 1982 | 05 |
Dylan and Kallan use Thunderbirds 1, 4, and 13 to rescue a friend of theirs when they become trapped in a fault line where magma is about to spill out into the ocean, underneath an oil refinery.
| 6 | "One of a Kind" | Katsuhito Akiyama | Akira Nakahara | 29 May 1982 | 06 |
Grant's mental conscience is put to test when the Thunderbirds are sent to a severe forest fire, where a biologically engineered stag is on the loose.
| 7 | "Child's Play" | Norihisa Okawa | Kazuo Yoshioka | 5 June 1982 | 07 |
During a tour of IRO Headquarters, two young boys who idolize the Thunderbirds wreak havoc when they mistakenly launch Thunderbird-1 and crash into a building.
| 8 | "Shadow Axis" | Akio Yamadera | Takayuki Kase | 12 June 1982 | 08 |
Kallan is captured by the Shadow Axis, an organization that follows the orders of Star Crusher, leaving Thunderbirds 4 and 13 at the bottom of the ocean.
| 9 | "Computer Madness" | Tatsuya Kasahara | Akira Nakahara | 19 June 1982 | 09 |
While Jesse and Little John handle repairs on Thunderbird 6, the remaining Thunderbird team must travel to the Moon to deactivate a supercomputer.
| 10 | "Kudzilla" | Noboru Ishiguro | Kazuo Yoshioka | 3 July 1982 | 10 |
The Thunderbirds must deal with a large acid-spitting plant in space, leaving Kallan in Thunderbird 9 to collect samples of the plant's DNA to create an antidote.
| 11 | "Nightmare" | Katsuhito Akiyama | Keiji Kubota | 10 July 1982 | 11 |
Dylan and his brother Danny head out in Thunderbird 10 to a space station where all people are terminally ill and under the influence of Star Crusher.
| 12 | "Snowbound" | Hiromichi Matano | Kazuo Yoshioka | 17 July 1982 | 12 |
The Thunderbirds rescue a trapped monorail during a snowstorm, where Dylan gets inside the buried area and Grant removes the snow using Thunderbird 5.
| 13 | "Big Deal" | Tatsuya Kasahara | Akira Nakahara | 24 July 1982 | 13 |
The Solar System's largest company, Asteroid Mines Inc., has suffered a series of sabotages on its mining ships carrying the rare material cryolite. The Thunderbirds are sent to investigate and uncover a plot to take over the company itself.
| 14 | "Thunderbolt" | Hiromichi Matano | Noboru Ishiguro, Fumio Ishimori; Story idea : Takeshi Shudo | 31 July 1982 | 14 |
Star Crusher sabotages a huge atmospheric flying air carrier, the Thunderbolt, with an explosion aboard the vessel that disables its controls. With the 1 1/2-mile-long Thunderbolt never being designed to land, the Thunderbirds have to develop a safe runway for the ship to prevent it from crashing down into a heavily populated city.
| 15 | "Guardian" | Tatsuya Kasahara | Akira Nakahara | 14 August 1982 | 15 |
The Thunderbirds must use the help of a dying space traveller to stop a spaceship carrying the traveller's cryogenically frozen brother.
| 16 | "Space Warriors" | Akio Yamadera | Akira Nakahara | 28 August 1982 | 16 |
Dylan joins the space patrol to track down a renegade rider who is on the run.
| 17 | "Sunburn" | Yasuo Hasegawa | Kazuo Yoshioka | 4 September 1982 | 17 |
This episode is based on the original Thunderbirds episode "Sun Probe". The space observatory Sunbeam is on a failing orbit that will take it into the Sun. The Thunderbirds race to the observatory to repair the booster rockets. While Grant is aboard the Sunbeam, Kallan attaches the new rocket to the hull in Thunderbird 1, Jesse and Little John use Thunderbird 2 to clear the damaged areas; however, this leaves Dylan on a dangerous task by flying Thunderbird 17 into the Sun itself to release a massive amount of energy from a large solar flare.
| 18 | "Star Crusher" | Shigeo Koshi | Keiji Kubota | 11 September 1982 | 18 |
Star Crusher lures the Thunderbirds to a construction site where the Prototype Engine for the newly built Thunderbird 18 is undergoing final tests, but trouble ensues when Thunderbird 2 is hijacked. Heading towards a waterfall, Jesse uses Thunderbird 12 to lift Thunderbird 2 out of the water to safety.
| 19 | "Crusader" | Unknown | Unknown | 10 September 2008 | 19 |
The Thunderbirds are given the role of environmental conservationists and thus sent on an unusual yet vital mission: a deadly dose of the illegal Agent Ultra chemical has spilled into the Pacific Ocean, threatening to wipe out the Aqua Institute of near-extinct wildlife.
| 20 | "Metal Head" | Unknown | Unknown | 17 September 2008 | 20 |
A promising visit to Vancouver turns into a fight for survival when the Science Minister and his crew become trapped within Metal City. The domed compound is under the control of Metal Head, an experimental 'living' computer forged from a portion of Dr. Budd's mind. The Thunderbird team must put their ingenuity to the test and find a way to bypass Metal Head's massive droid army and rescue the hostages.
| 21 | "Stardive" | Unknown | Unknown | 24 September 2008 | 21 |
Dylan is transformed from rescuer to rescuee when a disaster strands him on board the Centaur spaceship alongside Kristen Elliot, a rival pilot from the Blue Angels squad. With the ship locked on a decaying orbit towards Jupiter and air running out, the pair must put aside their differences to stay alive. Could their rivalry evolve into something more?
| 22 | "UFO" | Unknown | Unknown | 1 October 2008 | 22 |
A humongous comet is on a direct collision course with Earth, and will wipe out the entire planet in less than twelve hours. The Thunderbirds must head into action and do everything they can to save their home once more.
| 23 | "Mindmeld" | Unknown | Unknown | 8 October 2008 | 23 |
Lieutenant Sarah McBeth has been haunted by mysterious visions ever since her arrival on Moonbase Omega. Visions that lead her to a crystal compound buried near the colony. By removing a portion of the crystal, she releases a thousand-year-old evil that has the power to manipulate even time itself. The Thunderbirds must find a way to halt the indestructible force before it can reach Earth.
| 24 | "Trial" | Unknown | Unknown | 15 October 2008 | 24 |
A race of highly evolved beings have been watching countless civilizations for millions of years. Humanity has become their latest test subjects, and they must decide whether the species pose a threat to the universe. It is up to the Thunderbirds to convince the beings that Earth has evolved beyond its savage past.

== See also ==
- X-Bomber – previous Gerry Anderson-inspired production by Kimio Ikeda, Cosmo Productions and Jin Productions. Created by Go Nagai.
- Firestorm – Japanese anime co-created by Gerry Anderson and John Needham. Produced by Trans Arts.
