= 30 Minutes After Noon =

- Thunderbirds episode
- Southern (foreground) meets with Kenyon (left) and Dempsey (right). This shot employs forced perspective to suggest that the human hand portraying Southern is of the same scale as Kenyon and Dempsey's puppets.
- Episode no.: Series 1 Episode 18
- Directed by: David Elliott
- Written by: Alan Fennell
- Cinematography by: Paddy Seale
- Editing by: Harry Ledger
- Production code: 18
- Original air date: 11 November 1965

Guest character voices
- Sylvia Anderson as; Gladys Saltzman: Ray Barrett as; Southern Hitchhiker Police Officer Flanagan: Peter Dyneley as; Dempsey Police Officer Jones Erdman Gang Member: David Graham as; Kenyon Sir William Frazer Erdman Gang Leader Police Commissioner Garfield British Secret Service Aide Sam Saltzman: Matt Zimmerman as; Thomas Prescott Reporter Frank Forrester Police Officer

Episode chronology
← Previous "Desperate Intruder"	Next → "The Impostors"

"30 Minutes After Noon" is an episode of Thunderbirds, a British Supermarionation television series created by Gerry and Sylvia Anderson and filmed by their production company AP Films (APF) for ITC Entertainment. Written by Alan Fennell and directed by David Elliott, it was first broadcast on 11 November 1965 on ATV Midlands as the seventh episode of Series One. It is the 18th episode in the official running order.

Set in the 2060s, Thunderbirds follows the exploits of International Rescue, an organisation that uses technologically advanced rescue vehicles to save human life. The main characters are ex-astronaut Jeff Tracy, founder of International Rescue, and his five adult sons, who pilot the organisation's main vehicles: the Thunderbird machines. In "30 Minutes After Noon", International Rescue becomes involved in thwarting the Erdman Gang, a notorious criminal organisation, who first force an innocent worker in a bomb plot and later must save a British secret agent caught up in their next scheme.

Drawing inspiration from the spy film The Ipcress File, Elliott decided to realise Fennell's script through the use of what commentator Stephen La Rivière terms "quirky visuals". Elliott and camera operator Alan Perry experimented with original camera angles and movements, choosing to open one scene with a long tracking shot. The episode's incidental music is largely recycled from earlier APF productions.

Commentators including Nicholas J. Cull have noted that Elliott and Perry's cinematography emulates the visual style of 1960s James Bond films. Stephen La Rivière argues that this visual homage is not evident throughout, commenting that the episode's first half uses more conventional filming techniques. "30 Minutes After Noon" was released as an audio play in 1967 and serialised as a comic strip in 1992.

== Plot ==
While driving through Spoke City at night in anticipation of a third wedding anniversary dinner with his wife, government employee Thomas Prescott picks up a seemingly innocent hitchhiker. The stranger proceeds to place an unbreakable metal bracelet around Prescott's wrist, telling him that it contains an explosive charge which will detonate in 21 minutes. The key to unlock the bracelet is in Prescott's office at the Hudson Building. Racing to his place of work, Prescott unlocks the bracelet and leaves it in a filing cabinet. As he takes the lift back down to ground level, the bracelet explodes, destroying the building's top floors. The lift cables are severed and Prescott plunges to the bottom of the lift shaft, deep underground.

Although the fire is brought under control, Prescott is cut off. News of the disaster reaches International Rescue on Tracy Island. Jeff dispatches Scott to Spoke City in Thunderbird 1, followed by Virgil and Alan in Thunderbird 2. At the scene, Virgil and Alan descend the lift shaft in a new firefighting apparatus: a protective cage fitted with a claw. Clamping the damaged lift, they raise it to ground level and Prescott is arrested for causing the fire. Police Commissioner Garfield discovers that classified information on various criminal organisations, most notably the Erdman Gang, was destroyed in the blaze and that the Hudson Building's fire suppression systems had been sabotaged. After investigators find the remains of the bracelet, an intelligence operation is launched to smash the Erdman Gang.

Southern, a British Secret Service agent, is recruited to infiltrate the gang. After being initiated, the undercover operative is sent to the abandoned Glen Carrick Castle in Scotland to prepare for a mission, joined by gang members Dempsey and Kenyon. All three men have been fitted with bracelets identical to Prescott's. Radioing the castle, the gang leader gives them their assignment: they will use explosives to blow up Britain's Nuclear Plutonium Store, causing an atomic explosion which will devastate half of England. To ensure their obedience, the charges are in their bracelets and are set to detonate at 12:30 pm. The key to unlock the bracelets is in the store's vault.

After arriving at the Store, Southern and the others bypass the security doors and use a ray-gun to neutralise the Store's humanoid robot guards. When they reach the vault, Southern holds Dempsey and Kenyon at gunpoint, ordering them to rendezvous with the leader and capture him. The tables are turned when the last functioning robot approaches Southern from behind and traps him in its powerful arms. Dempsey and Kenyon unlock the bracelets, leaving them in the vault, and then set off for the rendezvous, jamming the security doors behind them to ensure that Southern is killed in the explosion.

Southern transmits a distress call to his superior, Sir William Frazer, who in turn radios International Rescue for help. Flying to the Store in Thunderbirds 1 and 2, Scott and Virgil use the Laser Cutter Vehicle to burn through the security doors. When they finally reach the vault at 12:25, Virgil deactivates the robot and releases Southern, while Scott seizes the bracelets and takes off in Thunderbird 1. He flies over the coast and jettisons the bracelets, which explode harmlessly in the sea. Elsewhere, Lady Penelope and Parker intercept Dempsey, Kenyon and the Leader as they are making their escape, using FAB 1's machine gun to shoot down their helijet. Southern recovers from his ordeal at Creighton-Ward Mansion.

== Regular voice cast ==
- Sylvia Anderson as Lady Penelope
- Ray Barrett as John Tracy
- Peter Dyneley as Jeff Tracy
- Christine Finn as Tin-Tin Kyrano
- David Graham as Gordon Tracy, Brains and Parker
- David Holliday as Virgil Tracy
- Shane Rimmer as Scott Tracy
- Matt Zimmerman as Alan Tracy

== Production ==
Director David Elliott was unenthusiastic about realising Alan Fennell's script until he saw the spy thriller The Ipcress File. He remembered that the film "used all the old-fashioned shots – looking through a lampshade, etc. On Monday morning, Paddy [Seale, the lighting cameraman] came in and said, 'I saw a film this weekend,' and I said, 'So did I.' 'Was it The Ipcress File?' 'Yep. Right, that's what I want to do.'" In homage to the film, Elliott incorporated what commentator Stephen La Rivière terms "quirky visuals" into his direction of the episode. Elliott frames Southern and his robot captive through a clock face showing the countdown. The robots were played by the puppet that played Brains' robot Braman in "Sun Probe".

The Glen Carrick Castle scene opens with a tracking shot covering all three walls of the puppet set, for which Elliott co-ordinated the camera movements with operator Alan Perry. In a pioneering move for a Supermarionation series, this scene also uses forced perspective to show a human hand and scale marionette puppets in the same shot: while the hand, intended to belong to Southern, plays with a pen in the extreme foreground, the puppets of Kenyon and Dempsey appear in the background. A visual illusion ensures that Kenyon and Dempsey appear correctly scaled in relation to the hand, even though Thunderbirds puppets were only 1/3 adult human size.

The miniature model representing Glen Carrick Castle was a reuse of the model of Castle McGregor from the Stingray episode "Loch Ness Monster". It later appeared as Glen Garry Castle in the Captain Scarlet and the Mysterons episode "The Trap".

Much of the episode's incidental music was originally composed for earlier APF series, particularly Stingray. Reused tracks include the Highland theme from "Loch Ness Monster" and "March of the Oysters" from "Secret of the Giant Oyster", another episode of Stingray.

== Reception ==
Sylvia Anderson noted Alan Fennell's "vivid imagination" and suggested that "30 Minutes After Noon" was "more a vehicle for live action than for the limited emotions of our puppet cast." According to Nathalie Olah of The Independent, the episode's plot highlights the "sense of drama" that made Thunderbirds popular: "Sure, most kids didn't understand the workings of a plutonium bomb, but the fact that the show was capable of sustaining their attention, as well as that of their older siblings and parents, meant they had some idea by the end of said episode."

Media historian Nicholas J. Cull links the episode to another of Fennell's Thunderbirds scripts, "The Man from MI.5", which features a British Secret Service agent called Bondson. For Cull, "30 Minutes After Noon" is one of several Thunderbirds episodes that includes visual homage to the James Bond films. In particular, he comments on Southern's briefing scene, in which the characters of Southern, Sir William Frazer and an unnamed aide are represented not by puppets, but by shots of their hats on a hatstand: "Southern's hat is a trilby, tossed onto the stand in best James Bond fashion." (Another of the hats – a bowler – belonged to Keith Shackleton, APF's head of merchandising.) Marcus Hearn praises the "densely plotted" story and suggests that the title was borrowed from the film Seven Days to Noon (1950). Tom Fox of Starburst magazine also praises the "hatstand homage" and names the robot guards and the Scottish castle as the episode's other highlights. He gives "30 Minutes After Noon" a score of 4 out of 5.

Stephen La Rivière acknowledges Elliott's decision to use an original visual style but argues that the first half of the episode is "filmed as normal". La Rivière also comments on the editing, noting that the plot of the episode is effectively split into two parts (the explosion at the Hudson Building followed by Southern's infiltration of the Erdman Gang). He suggests that this makes "30 Minutes After Noon" similar to the earliest episodes of Thunderbirds, which were originally 25 minutes long and subsequently extended to 50 minutes through the addition of secondary rescues and character-based subplots.

Marcus Hearn notes that the Erdman Gang's scheme "feeds off post-war unease about nuclear power" and that the episode gives "several recognisable nods" to the Bond films, especially in the hats conversation scene.

== Adaptations ==
In July 1967, Century 21 Records released an EP audio adaptation of "30 Minutes After Noon" narrated by David Graham as Parker.

In 1992, Fennell and Malcolm Stokes adapted the episode into a comic strip for issues 18 to 20 of Thunderbirds: The Comic. Later that year, the strip was collected in the graphic album Thunderbirds in Action.
