= The Impostors (Thunderbirds) =

- Thunderbirds episode
- Episode no.: Series 1 Episode 19
- Directed by: Desmond Saunders
- Written by: Dennis Spooner
- Cinematography by: Paddy Seale
- Editing by: Peter Elliott
- Production code: 19
- Original air date: 13 January 1966

Guest character voices
- Sylvia Anderson as; Ma Tuttle Fireflash Flight Attendant: Ray Barrett as; General Lambert Hale Jenkins Colonel Fireflash Co-Pilot: Peter Dyneley as; Jeremiah Tuttle Air Force Lieutenant Air Force Officer: David Graham as; Elliott Carela Jack Captain Hanson Search Controller Helijet Pilot: Matt Zimmerman as; Eddie Kerr Wakefield Speeding Driver

Episode chronology
← Previous "30 Minutes After Noon"	Next → "The Man from MI.5"

"The Impostors" is an episode of Thunderbirds, a British Supermarionation television series created by Gerry and Sylvia Anderson and filmed by their production company AP Films (later Century 21 Productions) for ITC Entertainment. Written by Dennis Spooner and directed by Desmond Saunders, it was first broadcast on 13 January 1966 on ATV Midlands as the 16th episode of Series One. In the official running order, it is the 19th episode.

Set in the 2060s, Thunderbirds follows the missions of International Rescue, a secret organisation which uses technologically advanced rescue vehicles to save human life. The lead characters are ex-astronaut Jeff Tracy, founder of International Rescue, and his five adult sons, who pilot the organisation's main vehicles: the Thunderbird machines. In "The Impostors", International Rescue is framed by two criminals for the theft of secret military aircraft plans and becomes the target of a worldwide manhunt; grounded on Tracy Island, the organisation is faced with a terrible dilemma when a mishap in orbit leaves an astronaut stranded in space, forcing the Tracys to choose between mounting a rescue and giving away their location or maintaining cover and leaving the man to die. Meanwhile, field agents Lady Penelope and Parker attempt to track down the impostors who stole the plans, with International Rescue's Agent 47.

In 1967, Century 21 released an audio adaptation of "The Impostors" on EP record (International Rescue, catalogue number MA 120), featuring narration by series voice cast member Shane Rimmer as Scott Tracy. The episode had its first UK‑wide network broadcast on 17 January 1992 on BBC2.

== Plot ==
At the Aeronautical Research Station, a fake International Rescue team rescues a man from an underground well, departing in an aircraft disguised as an ersatz Thunderbird craft, with the top-secret plans of the AL4, an experimental strategic fighter. Convincing himself that all of International Rescue's operations have been an elaborate ruse, General Lambert launches a worldwide search to track down International Rescue and bring them to justice; military forces scour the globe by land, sea and air.

On Tracy Island, Jeff declares International Rescue grounded until they are absolved of the theft. To find the impostors, he contacts their many agents around the world to help them. Agent Lady Penelope and her chauffeur Parker fly to America to interview witnesses to the staged rescue. In the southern states, hillbilly International Rescue agent Jeremiah Tuttle finds aircraft tracks in the woods leading to an old mine. Returning to the cabin where he lives with his elderly mother, he uses a concealed videophone to report his findings to Tracy Island. Due to the minimal evidence found, Jeff decides to take no action, unaware that the tracks were made by the aircraft flown by the impostors, Jenkins and Carela, who are using the mine as a hideout while preparing to sell the AL4 plans.

Lady Penelope receives vital information from Eddie Kerr, the World Television reporter who covered the fake rescue at the well, that the aircraft was an EJ2 flying south-south-west. This enables Jeff to pinpoint the impostors in the area covered by the Tuttles. Remembering Jeremiah's report of aircraft tracks, Jeff sends Penelope to rendezvous with their fellow agents and apprehend the impostors.

Meanwhile, Space Observatory 3, a scanning satellite covering the South Pacific region (where Tracy Island is located), is out of action due to an antenna fault. Technician Elliott suits up and goes outside to make repairs, but his jet pack goes haywire, thrusting him away from the satellite. Unable to retrieve Elliott, astronaut Hale informs Lambert that his colleague has only three hours of oxygen left. Apprised of the situation by John, who has been monitoring communications from Thunderbird 5, Jeff refuses to order a rescue, knowing that Tracy Island will be exposed once Hale completes the repairs. Eventually, Jeff changes his mind and sends Alan and Scott in Thunderbird 3 to rescue Elliott in the hope that Penelope will be able to clear their names in time.

At the Tuttles' cabin, Penelope declines Jeremiah's help in confronting the impostors and she and Parker set off for the mine on their own. FAB 1 is bogged down in mud, forcing them to proceed on foot. Arriving at the mine, Penelope, who has found the going tough in her high heels, is dismayed to find her pistol jammed with dirt. Hearing her cries, Jenkins and Carela arm themselves with rifles and prepare to open fire on them. However, they are prevented from firing by the arrival of the Tuttles, who throw a grenade (disguised as a tin of beans) into the mine to flush the impostors out of the cave. With International Rescue exonerated, the manhunt is called off by order of the White House, and Thunderbird 3 returns Elliott to the observatory.

== Regular voice cast ==
- Sylvia Anderson as Lady Penelope
- Ray Barrett as John Tracy
- Peter Dyneley as Jeff Tracy
- Christine Finn as Tin-Tin Kyrano
- David Graham as Gordon Tracy and Parker
- Shane Rimmer as Scott Tracy
- Matt Zimmerman as Alan Tracy

== Production ==
The miniature model representing the EJ2 previously appeared as an air-sea rescue craft in "Operation Crash-Dive". The puppet that was used for Tim Casey in "Edge of Impact" appears as a photographer who takes the picture of the impostor.

== Reception ==
In her autobiography, Sylvia Anderson, who voiced Ma Tuttle, commented that the episode makes good use of "space age" themes that were topical for the 1960s. She also wrote that she played Ma as a "Beverly Hills hillbilly".

Rating "The Impostors" three out of five, Tom Fox of Starburst magazine characterises the episode as a mixture of serious and light-hearted moments, describing the story as "eventually engaging". He regards the Tracy family's "clash of interests" – whether or not to risk exposure to save a man's life – as the highlight of the episode. For Marcus Hearn, the Tracys' moral dilemma is more interesting than the plot about the stolen plans, which he calls the "MacGuffin in this multi-layered story". He notes that Penelope's antics leave her in no fit state to battle the impostors, and praises the characters of Jeremiah and his Ma.

Chris Bentley praises the guest characters and story of "The Impostors". He praises the antagonistic role of General Lambert, who upsets and bullies everyone around him without questioning his own orders for a second, and cements his status when he snaps at Hale to not track International Rescue after learning they are innocent. He also praises Spooner's writing, the characters of Jeremiah Tuttle and Ma, Barry Gray's "ethereal music" and the final "suitably triumphant note" when Thunderbird 3 docks with the tracking satellite, International Rescue having reclaimed the moral high ground and their good name.

According to Richard Farrell, the episode derives humour from mocking the military and the news media (neither of which can locate International Rescue, despite being quick to condemn them) as well as poking fun at British and American cultural differences (for example, Penelope's ineptitude versus the Tuttles' initiative). Noting that the Tuttles are capable and well-equipped agents despite their "dozy hillbilly" ways, Farrell argues that they exemplify one of Gerry Anderson's "favourite themes" – the concept of people and things "not always being what they seem".

Fran Pheasant-Kelly, an academic who has studied the series' depiction of social class, observes that the Tuttles' status as "impoverished Southerners" – conveyed by aspects such as Jeremiah's "rough appearance" and actor Peter Dyneley's "drawling" voice for the character – belies their reliability and resourcefulness in coming to Penelope and Parker's aid. According to Pheasant-Kelley: "Given the obvious class differences between Penelope and the hillbilly couple, Anderson is clearly making a point about stereotypes in relation to social status."
