= Sun Probe =

- Thunderbirds episode
- Episode no.: Series 1 Episode 4
- Directed by: David Lane
- Written by: Alan Fennell
- Cinematography by: Paddy Seale
- Editing by: Peter Elliott
- Production code: 4
- Original air date: 9 December 1965

Guest character voices
- Ray Barrett as Colonel Benson and Colonel Harris; Peter Dyneley as Professor Heinz Bodman; David Graham as Solarnaut Asher and Braman; John Tate (uncredited) as Solarnaut Camp; Matt Zimmerman as a TV newsreader

Episode chronology
← Previous "City of Fire"	Next → "The Uninvited"

"Sun Probe" is an episode of Thunderbirds, a British Supermarionation television series created by Gerry and Sylvia Anderson and filmed by their production company AP Films (APF) for ITC Entertainment. Written by Alan Fennell and directed by David Lane, it was first broadcast on 9 December 1965 on ATV Midlands as the 11th episode of Series One. It is the fourth episode in the official running order.

Set in the 2060s, the series follows the exploits of International Rescue, an organisation that uses technologically advanced rescue vehicles to save human life. The main characters are ex-astronaut Jeff Tracy, founder of International Rescue, and his five adult sons, who pilot the organisation's main vehicles: the Thunderbird machines. In "Sun Probe", Thunderbirds 2 and 3 are launched to save a crew of astronauts whose spacecraft is locked on a collision course with the Sun.

== Plot ==
At Cape Kennedy in Florida, Colonel Benson oversees the launch of Sun Probe: a three-man spacecraft designed to extract a piece of matter from the Sun. The craft lifts off safely and its one-week journey to the Sun passes without incident. As Sun Probe nears its target, International Rescue are watching live coverage of the mission from Tracy Island. Brains is absent from proceedings as he is busy perfecting his latest invention, an artificially-intelligent humanoid robot called Braman. In space, astronauts Harris, Asher and Camp successfully fire the collector probe through a solar prominence. However, as the probe returns with the acquired solar matter, the intensifying radiation causes Sun Probe's retrorockets to fail, trapping the spacecraft in a collision course with the Sun.

On TV, Benson implores International Rescue to save the crew. Alan and Scott suggest remote-firing Sun Probe's rockets by radio beam from Thunderbird 3. Virgil points out that Thunderbird 2's transmitting capabilities are more powerful and it would be easier to send the signal from Earth. The team finally agree to launch a two-pronged rescue attempt. Alan, Scott and Tin-Tin blast off in Thunderbird 3 but their radio beam fails to reach Sun Probe, forcing them to move closer to the Sun than anticipated. Determining the best ground transmitting position to be in the Himalayas, Virgil and Brains take off in Thunderbird 2 carrying the Transmitter Truck. Landing on Mount Arkan, they align the truck's dish with Sun Probe but their signal falls short.

Further attempts to transmit from Thunderbird 3 also end in failure. As both space crews become increasingly delirious from the heat, Alan tells Tin-Tin to overrun the power. The beam finally makes contact, triggering Sun Probe's retros and enabling it to reverse course for Earth. However, the Thunderbird 3 crew pass out before they can switch off the beam, draining the craft's power and preventing its own retros from firing. With news media now reporting that Thunderbird 3 is heading straight for the Sun, Jeff alerts Virgil and Brains, who hurry back to Thunderbird 2 to calculate the frequency needed to set off Thunderbird 3's retros. Opening a crate that was meant to hold International Rescue's mobile computer, they are dismayed to find that they have accidentally packed Braman instead. However, Braman is able to make the necessary calculations, allowing Virgil and Brains to reconfigure the beam. The retros fire and Thunderbird 3 returns to Earth. Back at base, the Tracys thank Brains and Braman for their efforts.

== Regular voice cast ==
- Peter Dyneley as Jeff Tracy
- Christine Finn as Tin-Tin Kyrano
- David Graham as Gordon Tracy, Brains and Kyrano
- David Holliday as Virgil Tracy
- Shane Rimmer as Scott Tracy
- Matt Zimmerman as Alan Tracy

== Production ==
"Sun Probe" was the fourth episode of Thunderbirds to enter production. The story was devised by Gerry Anderson as a means of introducing Thunderbird 3, which had not been featured in any of the early scripts for the series. "Sun Probe" marks the first vocal contributions of Matt Zimmerman (the voice of Alan Tracy) to the series.

Originally filmed as a 25-minute episode in late 1964, "Sun Probe" was lengthened to 50 minutes in January 1965 to satisfy APF's sponsor Lew Grade, who had been impressed with the pilot episode and ordered that all episodes of Thunderbirds be extended to fill a one-hour timeslot. Anderson, Alan Pattillo and Tony Barwick expanded Alan Fennell's original storyline by adding the subplot of Thunderbird 2's mission to Mount Arkan and the plot twists involving the failure of Thunderbird 3's retro-rockets and Virgil and Brains' discovery that they have taken Braman with them. The newly written material also included a scene in which Brains and Braman play chess on Tracy Island, the Tracys' late night discussion about how to tackle the Sun Probe rescue and another that sees Harris, Asher and Camp preparing for blast-off at Cape Kennedy. An additional scene with Brains and Braman was omitted.

The new scenes were shot between the filming of "30 Minutes After Noon" and "The Impostors" and alongside that of "The Uninvited"; "Sun Probe" and "The Uninvited" were the first episodes of Thunderbirds to be extended. The re-shoots required the Thunderbird 3 and Cape Kennedy control room sets to be rebuilt from scratch. The chess scene was filmed in the Tracy Villa lounge instead of Brains' laboratory as the latter set was considered too detailed to recreate accurately. The Transmitter Truck model is a modified version of the explosives tractor seen in "End of the Road".

Anderson was displeased with the scenes of Sun Probe approaching the Sun and instructed the episode's sound editor to amplify the accompanying sound effects. He believed that Barry Gray's musical score, composed partly of material originally recorded for Fireball XL5, compensated for the lack of action and greatly improved the episode.

Some shots of the Sun Probe launch were duplicated for the opening scenes of "The Perils of Penelope", whose extending material was recorded back-to-back with "Sun Probe". The Thunderbird 3 launch sequence, devised by special effects director Derek Meddings, was recycled for "The Uninvited", "The Impostors", "Danger at Ocean Deep" and the series finale, "Give or Take a Million". The Braman puppet also appears in "Edge of Impact" and "30 Minutes After Noon" (in the latter episode, as the plutonium store guards).

The 1969 film Doppelgänger, which Gerry and Sylvia Anderson produced and co-wrote, also features a spacecraft called Sun Probe.

== Broadcast and reception ==
"Sun Probe" was broadcast as the 11th episode of Thunderbirds for both the series' original run and most of its 1960s reruns. Over five million people watched the episode on 11 October 1991 when it had its first network broadcast on BBC2, making it the channel's fourth most-watched programme of the week.

=== Critical response ===
Sylvia Anderson praised the special effects but characterised the episode in general as "too much space and too many machines for my taste" and a "Boys' Own adventure" lacking femininity.

Chris Bentley, author of The Complete Book of Thunderbirds responds positively to the episode, writing that it "successfully" showcases Thunderbird 3; John Marriott, author of Thunderbirds Are Go!, considers it melodramatic and "one of the most edge-of-the-sofa" episodes of the series. Marcus Hearn, author of Thunderbirds: The Vault, describes it as "nerve-wracking ... skilfully extended from its original 25-minute running time" and praises the substantial roles given to the "sometimes neglected" characters of Brains and Tin-Tin; he also compliments the mildly comic relationship between Brains and Braman. Nevertheless, he calls the Sun itself "probably the series' weakest special effect".

Tom Fox of Starburst magazine also gives a favourable review, writing that although "Sun Probe" features the series' "most drawn-out conclusion ever", it remains a "very busy" episode. Praising the roles of Brains, Alan and Tin-Tin, the portrayal of the astronauts' deliriousness and the "novel twist" of the malfunction on Thunderbird 3, he sums up the episode as a "good, slow-burning one" and awards a rating of four out of five stars.

Matthew Dennis of the website CultBox describes "Sun Probe" as "terrific stuff" and ranks it as one of the best episodes of Thunderbirds, noting its drama and suspense. David Gutierrez of DVD Verdict gives a rating of 85 out of 100.

== Adaptations ==
The clip show episode "Security Hazard" features a flashback to "Sun Probe". In 1966, an adaptation of the soundtrack, featuring newly recorded narration by Matt Zimmerman as Alan, was released by Century 21 Records on the vinyl EP Thunderbird 3 (code MA 112).

In 1981, the New York offices of ITC Entertainment combined "Sun Probe" with another space adventure – Series Two's "Ricochet" – to create Thunderbirds in Outer Space, one of three Thunderbirds compilation films that were sold to the American cable TV market in the early 1980s under the promotional banner "Super Space Theater".

In 1991, the episode was serialised by Alan Fennell and Malcolm Stokes over three issues of Thunderbirds: The Comic. The following year, a novelisation by Dave Morris was published by Young Corgi.

In 1994, "Sun Probe" was broadcast on Fox Network in the United States as an episode of Thunderbirds Are Go! – a series comprising re-edited versions of 13 of the original episodes, complete with new soundtracks. After further modifications, the re-edit aired on UPN in 1995 as an episode of Turbocharged Thunderbirds.

"Sun Probe" was later remade as "Slingshot", an episode of the remake series Thunderbirds Are Go.
