= Terror in New York City =

- Thunderbirds episode
- The episode features an attempt to relocate the Empire State Building using a giant cradle. The scale model of the building has drawn a mixed response for its craftsmanship. One commentator has called the atomic‑powered nature of the cradle an example of the series' "preoccupation" with nuclear technology.
- Episode no.: Series 1 Episode 13
- Directed by: David Elliott; David Lane
- Written by: Alan Fennell
- Cinematography by: Julien Lugrin
- Editing by: Peter Elliott
- Production code: 13
- Original air date: 21 October 1965

Guest character voices
- Ray Barrett as; USN Sentinel Commander TV Newscaster 1st NYPD Officer Ned Cook's Announcer: David Graham as; Joe USN Sentinel First Officer Clayton NYPD Officer Garner 2nd NYPD Officer: Shane Rimmer as; USN Sentinel Radar Operator Washington, D.C. Voice: Matt Zimmerman as; Ned Cook

Episode chronology
← Previous "The Perils of Penelope"	Next → "End of the Road"

"Terror in New York City" is an episode of Thunderbirds, a British Supermarionation television series created by Gerry and Sylvia Anderson and filmed by their production company AP Films (APF, later Century 21 Productions) for ITC Entertainment. Written by Alan Fennell and directed by David Elliott and David Lane, it was first broadcast on 21 October 1965 on ATV Midlands as the fourth episode of Series One. In the official running order, it is the 13th episode. It had its first UK-wide network broadcast on 22 November 1991 on BBC2.

Set in the 2060s, the series follows the exploits of International Rescue, an organisation that uses technologically advanced rescue vehicles to save human life. The main characters are ex-astronaut Jeff Tracy, founder of International Rescue, and his five adult sons, who pilot the organisation's primary fleet of vehicles: the Thunderbird machines. In "Terror in New York City", Thunderbird 2, International Rescue's transporter vehicle, is critically damaged when the United States Navy mistakes it for a hostile aircraft and launches a missile attack. Later, in New York City, a disastrous attempt to relocate the Empire State Building causes the skyscraper to collapse, trapping a news reporter and his cameraman in an underground river. With Thunderbird 2 out of action, International Rescue must find another way to transport submersible Thunderbird 4 to the disaster area and save the two men.

Critical response to "Terror in New York City" has been mostly positive, with one commentator naming it the best episode of Thunderbirds. Some commentators have drawn comparisons between aspects of the plot and the September 11 attacks.

== Plot ==
After extinguishing an oil well fire, Scott and Virgil Tracy prepare to return to base. As Virgil departs in Thunderbird 2, Scott discovers National Television Broadcasting System reporter Ned Cook and his cameraman, Joe, filming Thunderbird 1 and orders them to desist. Determined to have the makings of an award-winning scoop, Ned drives away with Joe, forcing Scott to pursue their van and use Thunderbird 1's electromagnetic pulse to erase the taped pictures.

En route to Tracy Island, Thunderbird 2 is spotted by United States Navy strike vessel USN Sentinel, whose crew mistake it for a hostile craft and target it with surface-to-air missiles. Jeff immediately contacts Washington, D.C. and has the attack called off, but Thunderbird 2 is badly damaged and on fire and Virgil is barely able to narrowly avoid crashing into the sea. Virgil pilots the stricken craft to a crash-landing on the Tracy Island runway. Although Virgil recovers from his ordeal, Thunderbird 2 will be out of action for a few weeks, as Brains organises repairs.

Some time later, the Tracys are watching a live broadcast of an operation to relocate the Empire State Building as part of the redevelopment to make way for a regeneration of Midtown Manhattan. The building is slowly moved along rail tracks, supported by a huge gantry tractor, but disaster strikes when a subsidence causes the skyscraper to break free of its cradle and collapse. Ned and Joe, who are covering the event, fall into a crevice and are trapped underneath the wreckage. Radioing the studio, Ned reports that they are in a cavern which is flooding with water. Brains theorises that the subsidence was caused by a subterranean river flowing into the cavern.

Ned and Joe's only hope is an underwater rescue, but without Thunderbird 2 the Tracys have no way of airlifting Thunderbird 4 to New York. Virgil proposes that the Sentinel transport the submersible by sea, and Jeff dispatches aquanaut Gordon to rendezvous with the Navy. Meanwhile, Scott flies out in Thunderbird 1 to help the authorities monitor Ned and Joe. A borehole is drilled into the cavern to supply the men with emergency underwater breathing equipment.

By the time the Sentinel reaches New York, the cavern is completely flooded and Ned and Joe have been forced to don their breathing equipment, which gives them enough air for just two more hours. Gordon launches Thunderbird 4 and sets off downriver, while Scott radios Ned and Joe, instructing them to start swimming upriver. Above ground, the subsidence has expanded and now threatens to bring down the nearby Fulmer Finance Building. Fearing that Ned and Joe will be killed, Scott urges Gordon to find them. Almost out of air, both men are finally recovered by Thunderbird 4, just as the Fulmer Finance Building collapses, triggering an underwater shockwave that sweeps Thunderbird 4 back into the harbour.

Later, Ned, using a wheelchair, introduces his regular TV show in front of a live audience by publicly thanking International Rescue for saving his and Joe's lives, unaware that most of the organisation are sitting in the back row.

== Regular voice cast ==
- Peter Dyneley as Jeff Tracy
- Christine Finn as Tin-Tin Kyrano
- David Graham as Gordon Tracy, Brains and Kyrano
- David Holliday as Virgil Tracy
- Shane Rimmer as Scott Tracy
- Matt Zimmerman as Alan Tracy

== Production ==
Inspiration for the episode came from Gerry Anderson, who had read a newspaper article about the relocation of a Japanese department store as part of a highway redevelopment scheme. Anderson later remembered that "because of its huge value as a going concern, [the store] was not demolished, but jacked up and moved inch by inch to a new site."

The episode's working title was "Terror of New York". Fennell's script was submitted before Lew Grade, APF's owner, ordered that all episodes be extended from 25 to 50 minutes to fill an hour-long timeslot. This required APF to add new scenes and subplots – in the case of this episode, the sequences showing the oil well fire and Ned Cook's unsuccessful attempt to film Thunderbird 1. The collapse of the Fulmer Finance Building may also have been added in. In a 1992 interview, actor Matt Zimmerman, who voiced Cook, described the character as having a "really thick accent – it was great fun to do."

To protect the Thunderbird 2 model during the filming of the crash-landing, the effects crew applied a foil coated in flammable rubber gel, then set fire to the covered areas only. However, the model still ended up being badly burnt. To allow filming to continue, effects assistants Mike Trim and Roger Dicken made a rushed temporary repair by covering the damaged portions in green Plasticine, greatly increasing the model's weight in the process. Trim soon realised that this was unnecessary, because the set was so full of smoke "you couldn't really have told whether the far side was completely missing, let alone burnt." The model was later rebuilt from scratch.

Series composer Barry Gray wrote three pieces of incidental music for the episode: "World Exclusive Foiled!", "Moving the Empire State Building" and "The Rescue of Ned Cook". The music was recorded on 5 April 1965 in a four-hour studio session with a group of 25 instrumentalists.

== Reception ==
At the time of its first broadcast, "Terror in New York City" was well received by Punch critic Patrick Skene Catling, who praised the "magnificent absurdity" of the plot as well as the visual spectacle and sound effects. He commented: "The suspense is nugatory, but the fun is immense". In 2015, The Guardian's Phelim O'Neill called the episode "a perfect example of how overloaded with disasters [Thunderbirds] could be." Sylvia Anderson liked the episode, later summing it up as an "exciting drama with an ingenious plot and stunning visual effects". She believed it to be one of Fennell's best scripts and praised the effects crew's "life-like" model work, writing that the 18-inch-tall (46 cm) model of the Empire State Building was "perfect in every detail, a work of art".

TV Zone considers the episode to be the best of the series, describing it as a "dramatic, tense story". The magazine praises the realism of the "tightly-plotted" script – from the decision to make the Empire State Building the focus of the disaster, to the method used to transport Thunderbird 4 to New York ("no deus ex machina cop-out is employed here"). On the damage sustained by Thunderbird 2, it points out that the Thunderbird machines' vulnerability comes as "something of a revelation ... we realise that the Tracy boys can actually be hurt". Its few criticisms include the appearance of the Empire State model (which it calls "a little insubstantial") and the fact that only two people are threatened by the building's collapse (considered to be the "most implausible" aspect of the plot). Tom Fox of Starburst magazine is less positive in his assessment, rating "Terror in New York City" three out of five. Describing the episode as "the 'disaster movie' special that was bound to come along", he criticises the "silly" building collapse and argues that the underwater puppet scenes lack realism; however, he expresses satisfaction with the scene of Thunderbird 2's emergency landing.

Marcus Hearn interprets Cook's reference to the "atomic" engines powering the Empire State Building's relocation cradle as an example of the series' "preoccupation with nuclear power", which he feels "betrays the era of its production." He believes that through its characterisation of Cook, the episode serves as a satire of American TV networks. Hearn also argues that unlike other episodes that were expanded to satisfy the longer runtime, "Terror in New York City" balances its "two major plot strands" effectively. He describes the final act as "quintessential Thunderbirds, with one jeopardy piled on another, a last-minute rescue and the sentimental redemption" of Ned.

Alan Barnes compares the plot to the Wunder von Lengede ("Miracle of Lengede"): a West German mining disaster that Gerry Anderson cited as his inspiration for Thunderbirds. Barnes notes that while the real-life disaster involved miners trapped in a pit whose rescue was delayed by the time needed to transport a drill, "Terror in New York City" concerns two men, trapped in a flooding cavern, whose rescue depends on a submarine that cannot be airlifted to them. He considers the crash-landing of Thunderbird 2 to be a highlight of the episode.

TV Zone describes the Empire State Building's destruction as "uncannily prescient" of the September 11 attacks. Stuart Galbraith IV of DVD Talk offers a similar view, calling the similarities between fiction and real life "eerie", while Fox writes that "modern events" give the episode "some uncomfortable overtones".

== Adaptations ==
Century 21 later adapted "Terror in New York City" into an audio play, released on EP record (Thunderbird 4, catalogue number MA 113) in November 1966. In 1982, the New York branch of ITC paired the episode with the Series Two instalment "Atlantic Inferno" (also written by Fennell) to create the Thunderbirds compilation film Countdown To Disaster.

The episode was subsequently serialised by Fennell and Keith Page in issues nine to eleven of Fleetway's Thunderbirds: The Comic, published in 1992. The strip was reprinted in the graphic album Thunderbirds in Action later that year.
