= Operation Crash-Dive =

- Thunderbirds episode
- Episode no.: Series 1 Episode 8
- Directed by: Desmond Saunders
- Written by: Martin Crump
- Cinematography by: Julien Lugrin
- Editing by: Harry Ledger
- Production code: 8
- Original air date: 16 December 1965

Guest character voices
- Ray Barrett as; Saboteur Bob (Fireflash 4 Co-Pilot) Lieutenant Burroughs: Peter Dyneley as; Commander Norman International Air Minister: David Graham as; Captain Hanson Fireflash Pilots 1 and 2 Engineer Patterson Farmer: David Holliday as; TV Newsreader 2: Shane Rimmer as; Radar Operator: Matt Zimmerman as; TV Newsreader 1 Air-Sea Rescue Pilot

Episode chronology
| ← Previous "Vault of Death" | Next → "Move – and You're Dead" |

"Operation Crash-Dive" is an episode of Thunderbirds, a British Supermarionation television series created by Gerry and Sylvia Anderson and filmed by their production company AP Films (APF) for ITC Entertainment. Written by Martin Crump and directed by Desmond Saunders, it was first broadcast on 16 December 1965 on ATV Midlands as the 12th episode of Series One. It is the eighth episode in the official running order.

Set in the 2060s, Thunderbirds follows the missions of International Rescue, a secret organisation which uses technologically advanced rescue vehicles to save human life. The lead characters are ex‑astronaut Jeff Tracy, founder of International Rescue, and his five adult sons, who pilot the organisation's primary vehicles: the Thunderbird machines. In "Operation Crash-Dive", International Rescue investigate the mysterious crashes of Fireflashes, a fleet of hypersonic airliners and discover it to be a case of sabotage.

In 1980, ITC's New York branch paired the episode with "Trapped in the Sky" to create the Thunderbirds compilation film Thunderbirds to the Rescue. "Operation Crash-Dive" had its first UK‑wide network broadcast on 8 November 1991 on BBC2.

== Plot ==
While flying from London International Airport to San Francisco, Fireflash 3 is crippled by a technical fault and disappears over the Atlantic Ocean. Rescue teams find no trace of the airliner, which was carrying 600 passengers and crew. On Thunderbird 5, Alan Tracy determines that the Fireflash's last radioed position was out by 50 miles (80 km).

By order of the International Air Minister, all Fireflashes are grounded pending a full safety review. No design flaws are uncovered, so Commander Norman orders a transatlantic test flight to identify the fault. During the flight, the elevator power unit, locator and radio fail, and the Fireflash loses altitude and belly-flops into the ocean. The emergency exit jams, trapping the crew, and the aircraft sinks. An unidentified man, who parachuted from the undercarriage, is picked up in a helijet.

Alan alerts Tracy Island, reporting that the Fireflash went down 180 miles (290 km) from its last radioed position. Jeff orders an undersea search-and-rescue mission, dispatching Scott in Thunderbird 1 followed by Virgil with Gordon and Brains in Thunderbird 2 carrying Pod 4. Brains believes that the Fireflash sank intact and that the crew may still be alive, trapped on the seabed and running out of air.

Landing at a farm in Ireland, Scott performs an electromagnetic sweep and plots the Fireflash's position. Gordon launches in Thunderbird 4 and locates the airliner. Using Thunderbird 4's laser beam, he cuts off the Fireflash's heavy engine nacelles to enable it to float to the surface. As the cockpit instruments short-circuit and burst into flames, Gordon mounts the fuselage and cuts a hole in the window using a handheld laser, freeing the crew. Virgil airlifts the crew to safety, and Gordon escapes in Thunderbird 4, moments before the Fireflash is destroyed in a series of explosions.

Air chiefs agree that the source of the Fireflashes' trouble lies in their wing hydraulics. Realising that another test flight is needed, Jeff contacts Commander Norman and recommends that Thunderbird 2 accompany the aircraft so that if the fault reoccurs, International Rescue can respond.

The Fireflash takes off, piloted by Captain Hanson and Scott and flanked by Thunderbird 2. Within minutes, the elevator power unit and other systems fail and the airliner begins to plunge towards the ocean. Hanson and Scott open a service hatch and Virgil steers Thunderbird 2 underneath the Fireflash, allowing Gordon to winch himself aboard. He finds that the elevator power unit cables have been cut, at which point the saboteur seen parachuting into the ocean comes out of hiding armed with a handgun. After a brief firefight, the saboteur tries to escape but is gunned down and falls out of the hatch. Moments before impact, Gordon presses the severed cables together, restoring power and enabling Scott and Hanson to pull the Fireflash out of its nosedive.

Within days, all Fireflashes are back in the air and the authorities have shut down the criminal organisation behind the sabotages. On Tracy Island, Grandma complains of a blown fuse, leading to Gordon's skills in fixing broken electronics being called on once again.

== Regular voice cast ==
- Ray Barrett as John Tracy
- Peter Dyneley as Jeff Tracy
- Christine Finn as Tin-Tin Kyrano and Grandma Tracy
- David Graham as Gordon Tracy and Brains
- David Holliday as Virgil Tracy
- Shane Rimmer as Scott Tracy
- Matt Zimmerman as Alan Tracy

== Production ==
The episode's working title was "The Test Crew". Intended as a direct follow-up to the first episode, "Trapped in the Sky", it sees the return of Fireflash as well as two of the earlier episode's guest characters, Fireflash pilot Captain Hanson and Commander Norman of London air traffic control. The premise of aerial sabotage, with International Rescue having to fix a malfunctioning airliner before it crashes into the ocean, is similar to the plot of the feature film Thunderbirds Are Go (1966). In the film, the Mars-bound spacecraft Zero-X is threatened by a saboteur prior to launch and suffers a power failure during re-entry; the second incident requires Alan Tracy to winch up to Zero-X and repair its electronics so that the astronauts can launch their escape pod before the spacecraft crashes into an evacuated town.

"Operation Crash-Dive" is one of several early episodes that were extended from 25 to 50 minutes after Lew Grade – APF's owner, who had been greatly impressed with the 25-minute pilot version of "Trapped in the Sky" – ordered the runtime doubled so that Thunderbirds would fill an hour-long TV timeslot. Most of the second half, in which International Rescue confront the saboteur, is extended material; the original shorter episode had no sabotage plot (the Fireflash disasters instead being caused by technical faults, which Brains helped to solve) and ended with Scott's return to base from the farm in Ireland. The additional material for "Trapped in the Sky" was filmed in tandem with this episode.

== Broadcast ==
A two-part version, broadcast in some UK regions, included linking narration revealing that the Fireflash which sinks to the ocean bed is Fireflash 4 – a designation not spoken in the episode itself. Some of the dialogue in the London Airport scenes was cut, as was certain material from the episode's halfway point, including the launching of Thunderbirds 1 and 2, Scott's landing in Ireland and a scene in which Brains calculates the sunken Fireflash's position.

== Reception ==
Rating "Operation Crash-Dive" three out of five, Tom Fox of Starburst magazine writes that the episode is slowed down by some of its technical dialogue and underwater scenes. Although he considers it "not the most gripping of episodes", he praises the scale model work and special effects.

Noting the reported 600 deaths aboard Fireflash 3, Marcus Hearn describes such heavy loss of life as shocking for an episode of Thunderbirds. Though conceding that the reappearance of Fireflash potentially makes the story feel "mundane and repetitive", Hearn argues that "Operation Crash-Dive" was highly topical for the 1960s: he compares Fireflash to the accident-prone de Havilland Comet (the first commercial jet airliner, which had several fatal crashes during the 1950s) and suggests that the resulting loss of confidence in British plane-making inspired the episode's sabotage premise. Hearn adds that the characterisation of the International Air Minister as a Frenchman (voiced with appropriate accent by Peter Dyneley) heralds the optimistic new era of Concorde, a Franco-British collaboration which first flew in 1969.

Chris Bentley, author of The Complete Book of Thunderbirds, responds positively to the episode. He praises the rescues of the Fireflashes, adding that the episode successfully showcases Thunderbird 4 and establishes Gordon Tracy as "International Rescue's crack shot".
