= Nathalie Olah =

British writer and cultural critic

- Born: December 1988 (age 37); Birmingham, England
- Education: University of Oxford (English Literature) University of Sussex (Postcolonial Studies)
- Writing career
- Years active: 2019–present
- Notable work: Bad Taste (2023)
- Website: www.nathalieolah.com

Nathalie Olah is a British writer and cultural critic, living in London. Her books include Steal as Much as You Can (2019) and Bad Taste (2023).

== Early life and education ==
Olah was born in Birmingham. She lived in social housing for part of her childhood and attended state schools. She gained a BA in English Literature from Christ Church, Oxford and an MA in Postcolonial Studies from the University of Sussex.

== Writing ==
According to Francisco Garcia writing in The i Paper, Steal as Much as You Can (2019) reveals among other things the enduring legacy of the UK of the 1990s: "a deliberately emaciated working class or vernacular culture in favour of an increasingly stratified world, rigged for the privileged and propped up by a media whose focus is to reinforce middle-class cultural and political interests." The book proposes solutions.

According to Sheena Patel writing in the London Standard, Bad Taste (2023) "dissects what taste is through an intersection of class, of belonging, success and how privilege disguises itself and the ways in which that reflects your position or locks you out of the worlds you want to enter."

In 2024, Tate commissioned Olah to write an essay to mark the 40th anniversary of the Turner Prize.

Olah received the 2025 Society of Authors' Travelling Scholarship award.

== Personal life ==
Olah has lived in London since 2015.

== Publications ==
- Steal as Much as You Can: How to Win the Culture Wars in an Age of Austerity. Repeater, 2019. ISBN 9781912248568.
- Look Again: Class. Tate, 2021. ISBN 978-1849767750.
- Bad Taste: or the Politics of Ugliness. Dialogue, 2023. ISBN 978-0349702261.
