= Thunderbirds (2000 video game) =

2000 video game

- Game Boy Advance cover art
- Developer: Pukka Games
- Publisher: SCi Games
- Platforms: Game Boy Color, Game Boy Advance
- Release: Game Boy Color: EU: 1 December 2000; Game Boy Advance: EU: 7 December 2001
- Genres: Action, racing
- Mode: Single-player

Thunderbirds is a 2000 action game for the Game Boy Color developed by Pukka Games and published by SCi Games, licensed from the Thunderbirds franchise, released in 2001 for the Game Boy Advance as Thunderbirds: International Rescue. The game is not to be confused with the 2004 Game Boy Advance title of the same name.

== Gameplay ==
A screenshot of the Game Boy Color version of Thunderbirds.

Thunderbirds is an action game in which the player controls the Thunderbirds, a series of vehicles and craft from the television series as part of International Rescue to save members of the public and defeat their arch-rival The Hood. The game requires the player to alternate between available craft to complete missions across 22 levels, each largely requiring the player to search for tools and bomb enemy targets within a time limit. Gameplay differs depending upon the craft - for instance, missions featuring Thunderbird 1 involve side-scrolling shoot 'em ups bombing enemy satellites and rescuing hostages, whilst missions featuring Thunderbird 2 involve navigating mazes from a top-down perspective. Some levels feature racing mechanics as the player races Lady Penelope's Rolls-Royce FAB1 against a time limit or limited fuel. The Game Boy Advance version of Thunderbirds is broadly similar to the design of its Game Boy Color counterpart, although featuring updated graphics and different levels, including side-scrolling platforming and a meteor-dodging race in Thunderbird 3.

== Development ==
SCi Games obtained the licensing rights for Thunderbirds in December 1999 to coincide with the digital restoration and relaunch of the 1965 television show on BBC2 in 2000. In line with this acquisition, in 2000 the publisher announced development of Thunderbirds titles for the PlayStation 2, mobile media in August 2000, and the release of handheld titles for the Game Boy Color and Game Boy Advance. Although a PlayStation 2 version was prototyped with Deep Red Games, and screen renders and videos of the game were previewed at the September 2000 European Computer Trade Show, no console title of Thunderbirds was released.

== Reception ==
Reception

Review scores
Publication	Score	
Publication	GBA	GBC
Hyper	8/10	
64 Magazine		90%
Game Boy Power		90%
Game Boy Xtreme	73%	
Total Game Boy	88%	96%

Reviews for both versions of Thunderbirds received positive reception from critics. The Game Boy Color version received unanimous praise. Ian Osborne for Game Boy Power stated the game as "wonderfully atmospheric" and "fun to play", praising the "realistic" craft, the "learning curve" and "excellent graphics", whilst noting the game's missions "could be a little more varied". Jem Roberts of Total Game Boy praised the game as a "ripping adventure with very carefully set difficulty levels, great graphics and sounds, and a real sense of character", finding that the game "truly does justice to the legendary adventures of International Rescue". 64 Magazine stated Thunderbirds is "incredibly well designed and great fun, the different gameplay styles providing a ton of variety" and with "superb" sound. James Cottee of Hyper praised the game's "great deal of variety in play styles" and the "flair" of the graphics.

The Game Boy Advance version received slightly more lukewarm reception. Jem Roberts of Total Game Boy observed the title "hasn't progressed that far" from the Game Boy Color version, which "pushed the capabilities of the console to the limit". However, Roberts noted the game was an "impressive translation" to the Game Boy Advance, praising the addition of platforming and "plenty of different game styles". In a less positive review, Jamie Wilks for Game Boy Xtreme stated the game was "a reasonable game that manages to keep you playing by switching the game modes", but featured "basic gameplay" and was "unoriginal". The Sydney Morning Herald gave the game a score of 2.5 out of 5.
