= List of Thunderbirds vehicles =

Series of fictional vehicles in the Thunderbirds franchise

The Thunderbirds as seen in the remake Thunderbirds Are Go. Clockwise from top: Thunderbird 1, Thunderbird 5, Thunderbird 4, Thunderbird 2, Thunderbird 3, Thunderbird Shadow. Commentators described the new Thunderbirds 2 to 4 as more "blocky" or "angular" than the 1960s originals. Thunderbird 5 was the most heavily redesigned.

Multiple land, air, sea and space vehicles appear in the 1960s British Supermarionation television series Thunderbirds and its adaptations. Many of the futuristic craft seen in the productions were designed by Thunderbirds special effects director Derek Meddings.

The most prominent vehicles are the five principal rescue craft of the International Rescue organisation: the "Thunderbird machines" (after which the series was named). In the fictional world of Thunderbirds, all of the International Rescue vehicles were designed by Brains, the organisation's resident scientist.

== International Rescue vehicles ==
=== Thunderbird machines ===
International Rescue's fleet comprises five principal rescue vehicles called the "Thunderbird machines":

==== Thunderbird 1 ====
Thunderbird 1

Information
- Auxiliary vehicles: Remotely-operated and heat-resistant flying camera

General characteristics
- Defences: Destructor cannon, steel spears, automatic camera detector, electromagnetic wiping beam, radar-jamming system
- Maximum speed: 15,000 miles per hour (24,000 km/h)
- Power: Rocket propellant, turbo-jet fuel, atomic fusion reactor
- Mass: 140 tons
- Length: 115 feet (35 m)
- Width: Fuselage: 12 feet (3.7 m); Wingspan: 80 feet (24 m)

Pilot: Scott Tracy

Thunderbird 1 is a variable-geometry (swing wing) hypersonic rocket plane, blue and grey in colour, which is used for fast response and rescue zone reconnaissance, and as a mobile control base. It has VTOL capabilities which are demonstrated in many episodes, and its take-off from Tracy Island is usually vertical. With a maximum speed of 15,000 miles per hour (24,000 km/h), it can reach anywhere on Earth within an hour's flight if a great circle route can be flown. Thunderbird 1 is hangared beneath the main house on Tracy Island and launches vertically from a pad camouflaged by a swimming pool that slides aside.

The aircraft is primarily piloted by Scott Tracy, with Alan taking his place when he is unavailable as Thunderbirds 1 and 3 are rarely required on the same mission (such as in "Atlantic Inferno", when Scott takes charge of Tracy Island while Jeff is on holiday). Jeff describes Thunderbird 1 as "sleek, first and fast" at the beginning of Thunderbird 6.

One of the most popular errors noticed amongst Thunderbirds fans is the pilot's ability to control almost all of the many functions of the rocket simply by moving one of the two control levers forward or back.

Thunderbird 1 appears in most episodes of the series; as a reconnaissance craft, it often assesses which vehicles are needed to effect a rescue. It does not appear in "Sun Probe", "The Impostors", "Ricochet" or "Give or Take a Million". In "The Uninvited", Thunderbird 1 is shot down by the Zombite Fighters and crashes into the desert. Scott is rescued by two explorers.

===== In adaptations =====
Thunderbird 1 appears in the 2004 film Thunderbirds, where it has an updated look similar to the original: silver-grey, with blue and yellow detailing and red nose cone.

In the remake series Thunderbirds Are Go, Thunderbird 1 features a design similar to the original but with subtle changes and retains the role it has in the original series. However, like all of the Thunderbirds, it can be piloted remotely through Scott's wrist console. It also possesses an electromagnetic cable that can be fired from the open cargo bay, allowing it to lift or tow objects. The electromagnet at the end of the cable can be swapped for a clip. It also carries a Skypod, a short-range flying capsule that allows Scott to get in close to a target where Thunderbird 1's size would be a disadvantage, as well as several remote-operated drones that can be deployed to search multiple areas or places that cannot be reached by conventional means.

==== Thunderbird 2 ====
Thunderbird 2

Information
- Auxiliary vehicles: Pod vehicles

General characteristics
- Armaments: Missile gun
- Maximum speed: 5,000 miles per hour (8,000 km/h)
- Power: Atomic fusion reactor
- Mass: 406 tons (without payload)
- Length: 250 feet (76 m)
- Width: 180-foot (55 m) wingspan
- Height: 60 feet (18 m); 110 feet (34 m) with legs lowered

Pilot: Virgil Tracy
Co-pilot: Gordon Tracy

Thunderbird 2 is International Rescue's heavy-duty transporter aircraft, which carries rescue equipment to the danger zone in one of six pods. It is a large, green VTOL aircraft that is involved in most ground- and sea-based rescue missions. It is piloted by Virgil Tracy, often accompanied by either Scott, Alan, Gordon or Brains, sometimes by Tin-Tin Kyrano, and on at least one occasion by Lady Penelope.

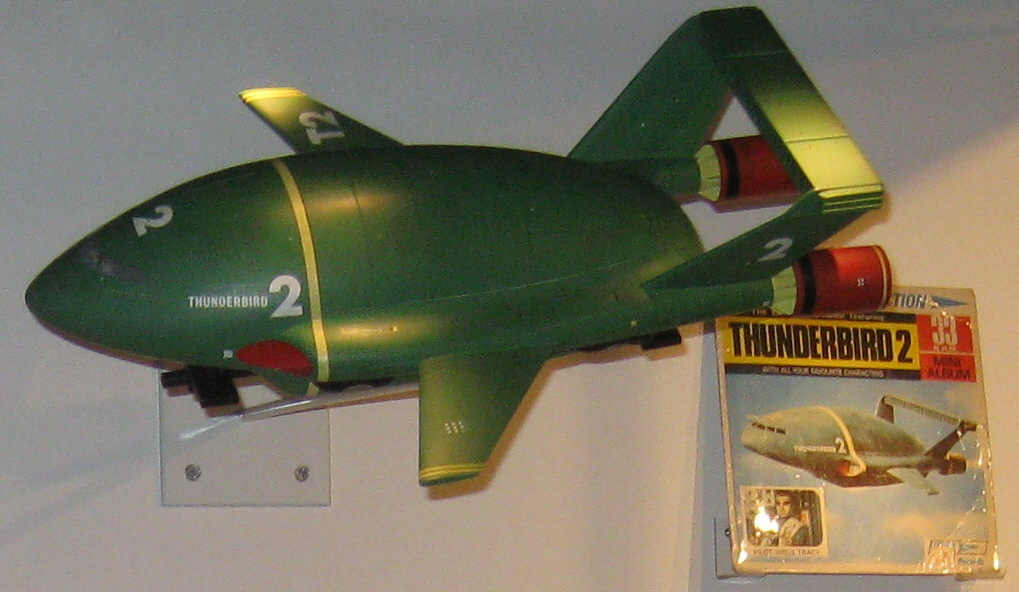
Replica of the original 1960s Thunderbird 2 on display at the National Media Museum

Designer Derek Meddings maintained that the forward-swept wings were a purely aesthetic decision intended to make Thunderbird 2 stand out next to real-life aircraft: "All aircraft have swept-back wings, so I thought I'd sweep mine forward."

The launch sequence begins with the opening of a concealed hangar door disguised as a cliff face. Inside, Thunderbird 2 stands on extended landing gear, ready to load one of six large equipment pods, which make up nearly half the volume of the craft. The pods slide on a conveyor belt until the desired one is in position, and the craft then lowers onto the pod. The aircraft then taxis down a runway flanked with palm trees that fall back to accommodate the large wingspan. It is then raised on a platform until it is at the correct angle for take-off. A blast shield rises at the rear of the launch ramp, channelling the exhaust of the rear engines through a series of tunnels to the other side of the island. Thunderbird 2 launches from this angle rather than using the VTOL thrusters because it is much more fuel efficient.

A long-range craft, Thunderbird 2 is capable of reaching anywhere in the world without refuelling. It has a cruising speed of 2,000 miles per hour (3,200 km/h). It is the most frequently seen of all the Thunderbirds, appearing in all but one episode of the TV series ("The Impostors") and in all three films. In "Terror in New York City", Thunderbird 2 is fired upon and crippled by the warship USN Sentinel and remains out of operation for the rest of the episode. The vehicle is subsequently repaired using parts sourced from several different aircraft companies to protect the secrets of the aircraft's design.

===== In adaptations =====
In the 2004 film, Thunderbird 2 is given an updated design that does not include a hollowed-out middle to carry any pods; instead, the craft has a solid body that carries several pod vehicles within.

In the remake series Thunderbirds Are Go, Thunderbird 2 features a slightly updated design (with the pods now called "Modules") while retaining its role as the team's workhorse. The craft now features the same electromagnetic cable reels as Thunderbird 1. Like the other Thunderbird craft, Thunderbird 2 can be piloted remotely through Virgil's wrist device. The contents of Thunderbird 2's Modules differ from the pods of the original series. Module 1 specialises in carrying fire-fighting equipment and contains large speakers and subwoofers topside that are used primarily to emit low-frequency sound waves for use against large fires. It also comes with two under-slung liquid nitrogen cannons. Module 2 contains three "pods", special units that can be converted and customised into several different rescue vehicles such as the Mole. Module 3 contains electromagnetic "grabs", large claws designed to lift objects heavier than the standard electromagnetic cables can handle. The nose of the craft also contains a set of grabs that can hold a set of seats for lifting people. Module 4 contains Thunderbird 4 as Pod 4 did in the original series. Module 5 consists of a fuel pump to refuel other vessels, as well as seats. Module 6, like Module 4, is capable of carrying Thunderbird 4, but is used during space travel.

==== Thunderbird 3 ====
Thunderbird 3
- First appearance: "The Uninvited" (1965)

General characteristics
- Propulsion: Chemical rockets Ion-drive particle accelerators
- Power: Atomic fusion reactor
- Mass: 562 tons
- Length: 287 feet (87 m)
- Width: 23 feet (7.0 m) main body; 80 feet (24 m) with nacelles

Astronaut: Alan Tracy or John Tracy
Co-pilots: Scott Tracy and Tin-Tin Kyrano

Thunderbird 3 is a vertically-launched single-stage-to-orbit spacecraft used for space rescue and maintenance of Thunderbird 5. It is 287 feet (87 m) long, with a 23 feet (7 m) wide body and a 79 feet (24 m) span including the engines. It is red in colour. One source says it is orange. The craft is used for space rescues in "Sun Probe", "Ricochet", "The Impostors" as well as escorting the Zero-X in the film Thunderbirds Are Go.

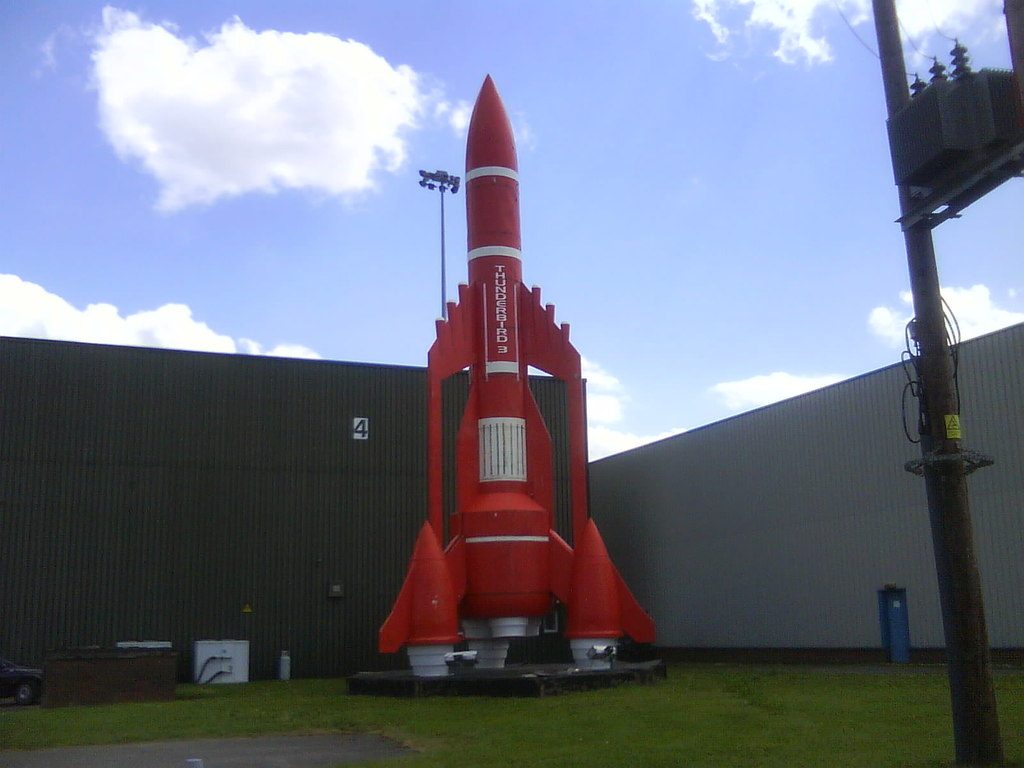
A model of the redesigned Thunderbird 3 from the 2004 film. Director Jonathan Frakes wanted the Thunderbirds to have a "sleek, pristine" look, so requested bright colours with minimal hull texturing.

Thunderbird 3 is unique among the Thunderbird craft in having its dimensions quoted in an episode of the series: in "Give or Take a Million" Jeff Tracy states that the spacecraft is 287 feet (87 m) tall. However, Brains says in a videotaped interview that Thunderbird 3 is "200 feet [61 m] in height".

The spacecraft uses chemical rockets for lift-off and boost, and an ion drive for propulsion in space. It is hangared beneath the "Round House" on Tracy Island, and is primarily piloted by Alan or John Tracy, with Scott often co-piloting. Since John is usually seen in Thunderbird 5, he is rarely seen piloting the spacecraft (only in "The Mighty Atom" and "Danger at Ocean Deep" and "The Uninvited", and never in a rescue situation). In "Ricochet", Thunderbird 3 is piloted by Virgil.

===== In adaptations =====
Thunderbird 3 features a slightly different design in the series Thunderbirds Are Go. The three support structures on the engines are now grapple arms that can swing forward, which hold four electromagnetic cables each, and the nose cone of the craft holds a drill. The cockpit area can rotate to keep the pilot orientated "up" in relation to Earth regardless of the orientation of the rest of the craft. Like Thunderbird 2, Thunderbird 3 features a customisable pod vehicle in its cargo bay that is specialised for space rescues. Like the other Thunderbirds, it can be piloted remotely through Alan's wrist device.

==== Thunderbird 4 ====
Thunderbird 4
- First appearance: "The Mighty Atom" (1965)

General characteristics
- Armaments: Missile launcher
- Maximum speed: Submerged: 160 knots (180 mph; 300 km/h); Surface: 40 knots (46 mph; 74 km/h)
- Power: Twin atomic fusion reactors
- Mass: 16 tons
- Length: 30 feet (9.1 m)
- Width: 11 feet (3.4 m)

Aquanaut: Gordon Tracy

Piloted by aquanaut Gordon Tracy, Thunderbird 4 is a yellow utility submersible for underwater rescue. It is 30 feet (9 m) long and 11 feet (3.4 m) wide, which makes it the smallest of the Thunderbirds vehicles but not the smallest of the pod vehicles. Thunderbird 4 is carried aboard Thunderbird 2 – usually in Pod 4, though on one occasion in Pod 6 ("Attack of the Alligators!"). In "Terror in New York City", when Thunderbird 2 is temporarily out of action and Thunderbird 4 is needed, the craft has to be launched by emergency procedure, from the Thunderbird 2 hangar along the island runway, with the runway's overhang lowering itself into the sea as Thunderbird 4 approaches it.

Thunderbird 4's slow speed makes it impractical for the craft to travel long distances on its own. In "Terror in New York City", Jeff Tracy contacts the Sentinel – the warship responsible for incapacitating Thunderbird 2 – to pick up Thunderbird 4 and ship it to the danger zone. The submersible is fitted with an adjustable searchlight which can be raised or lowered to reveal a variety of rescue instruments, such as cutting lasers, electromagnets, demolition rockets and battering rams, which can be extended from the nose section.

Thunderbird 4 does not play an active role in the films Thunderbirds Are Go and Thunderbird 6. It does, however, appear in the title sequence of Thunderbirds Are Go. In Thunderbird 6, Jeff Tracy gives a "run down" on each of the Thunderbirds machines in which Thunderbird 4 makes a brief appearance.

Theo De Klerk considers Thunderbird 4 to have the least practical design of the fleet, stating that its non-cylindrical shape makes it ill-adapted to extreme underwater pressures. In a list of "Top Ten Cool Sci-Fi Vehicles", syfy.co.uk ranked Thunderbird 4 seventh. The Daily Mirror questions why the submersible is one of the Thunderbirds given that it "can't even go anywhere on its own", having to be "carried around" by Thunderbird 2 instead.

===== In adaptations =====
The submersible appears in the 2004 film with an updated design, including space for two operators, larger cockpit windows, searchlights and two under-slung claws. It is handled by Alan Tracy rather than Gordon because the latter is unavailable, having been stranded along with his father and brothers in space.

For the remake series Thunderbirds Are Go, Thunderbird 4 features a slightly updated and streamlined design with some new features. It now possesses a pair of deployable grapple arms and two "dry tube" evacuation pods in its stern. The cockpit floor has a large transparent viewport. Like the rest of the Thunderbirds, it can be piloted remotely through Gordon's wrist device. During a rescue mission on Jupiter's moon Europa in the episode "Deep Search", it is shown that Thunderbird 4 can also be transported in Thunderbird 3, although it has been given new features to cope with the icy conditions on Europa. When not in use, Thunderbird 4 is housed in one of Thunderbird 2's Modules and a water tank, so that it can launch from the island when necessary.

==== Thunderbird 5 ====
Thunderbird 5

General characteristics
- Defences: Radar cloaking system Meteor deflector
- Power: Atomic batteries and reactors
- Mass: 976 tons
- Length: 400 feet (120 m)
- Width: 296-foot (90 m) diameter
- Height: 272 feet (83 m)

Space monitor: John Tracy or Alan Tracy

The largest rescue vehicle in the Thunderbirds inventory, Thunderbird 5 is an Earth-orbiting space station that monitors all broadcasts around the globe for distress calls and manages communications within International Rescue. It is equipped with almost completely automated onboard systems, allowing the entire station to be run by a single crew member. It is primarily commanded by John Tracy, although he is periodically relieved by Alan (according to the storyline, John and Alan swap roles once a month, one piloting Thunderbird 3 and the other monitoring from Thunderbird 5). The space station is located in a geosynchronous orbit above the Pacific Ocean. It is electronically cloaked to avoid detection from ground-based radar or other spacecraft's sensor systems.

Derek Meddings designed Thunderbird 5 after the other machines and based its look on the Tracy Island Roundhouse model (through which Thunderbird 3 launches). According to spaceflight historian Jack Hagerty, the shape of Thunderbird 5 "pays homage to the earlier circular stations of Willy Ley and Wernher von Braun", as well as the space station depicted in the 1955 film Conquest of Space.

===== In adaptations =====
For the series Thunderbirds Are Go, Thunderbird 5 is heavily redesigned. It now features a rotating habitation ring, which uses centrifugal force to provide occupants with artificial gravity. The station has a holographic computer system, also present within the Tracy home as well as the other Thunderbirds, which allows John to have face-to-face conversations with the rest of the team and display information relevant to missions. Thunderbird 5 is also equipped with a space elevator (a rocket-equipped pod on a length of cable), which allows John to travel between the station and Tracy Island without having to rely on Thunderbird 3. The station is also equipped with one configurable pod vehicle. Its surveillance and data technology enable it to access almost any kind of digital information that is not secured.

Starting in the episode "EOS", the station is co-operated by the artificial intelligence EOS, which has access to all of the station's systems. The entity – which was created by accident in the previous episode, "Runaway" – initially has a violent sense of self-preservation which leads to it seizing control of the station and attempting to kill John. After John is able to convince EOS that no one is threatening it, EOS becomes his on-board companion, albeit with a mischievous streak.

==== Critical response ====
Graeme Shimmin considers Thunderbird 2 the best aircraft in fiction, as well as the "most iconic" of the Thunderbirds. A Daily Mirror article describes Thunderbird 2 as "obviously the best Thunderbird. It is huge, it is green, it is a beautiful machine." In contrast, Thunderbird 5 is "the most boring Thunderbird of all, sat in space 'monitoring transmissions'."

Dr Phillip Atcliffe, an aerospace engineer from the University of Salford, has discussed the real-world feasibility of the Thunderbird designs. His observations include wings of questionable function or value (in the case of Thunderbirds 1 and 2) and a lack of streamlining (Thunderbirds 1, 2 and 4). Atcliffe also queries how Thunderbird 3 would be able to manage its roll and states that International Rescue would probably need other space stations besides Thunderbird 5 to achieve global radio coverage.

According to Theo de Klerk, none of the Thunderbirds appear to have adequate capacity for large amounts of fuel, or turbo generators to convert the heat from their nuclear reactors. De Klerk also states that both Thunderbirds 1 and 2 would be hindered by the drag created by their engine blocks. He adds that the single VTOL rocket in Thunderbird 1's block would provide little stability during lift-off from Tracy Island, and that given Thunderbird 2's shape, weight and short runway, it is debatable whether that craft could achieve enough lift to take off.

On Thunderbirds 3 and 5, de Klerk states that with only three main rocket engines, Thunderbird 3 could be unstable in flight, and that International Rescue would need three supporting satellites positioned around the Earth to compensate for Thunderbird 5's radio blind spots. He also notes that the crew of Thunderbird 3 do not appear to lie on their backs for lift-off, despite the increased G-force of space launches, and that while both Thunderbirds 3 and 5 produce artificial gravity for their occupants, it is unclear how.

In a discussion of Thunderbird 5, a science article published by the University of Leicester stated that while "[logically] it would be desirable for this secret space station not to be visible from Earth with the naked eye", the Thunderbird would be unable to attain the extremely low albedo needed to stay invisible; as a result, observers on Earth would be able to see it.

=== Others ===
==== Thunderbird 2 pod vehicles ====
Thunderbird 2 carries specialised rescue vehicles and equipment to disaster sites in one of six interchangeable capsules, called "pods". The "pod vehicles" are stored within the aircraft's cavernous hangar or kept on standby within the pods themselves. In the remake series Thunderbirds Are Go, the vehicles can be converted and customised into many different rescue machines for a wide range of purposes.

===== The Mole =====
The Mole is a tunnelling subterrene that assists in underground rescues. It is carried to rescue sites on a trolley and tilted upwards to begin drilling. Caterpillar tracks on both sides enable it to return to the surface. The Mole is notable for being one of the few pod vehicles to appear in more than one episode, featuring in "Pit of Peril", "City of Fire" and "The Duchess Assignment". It also appears in the closing credits alongside the five Thunderbird machines, Fireflash and FAB 1.

In a list of "greatest vehicles" in Supermarionation productions, commentator Fred McNamara ranks the Mole fifth, calling it "one of the most recognisable" pod vehicles. The Daily Mirror describes it as "the best Thunderbird vehicle that wasn't a Thunderbird". Car magazine ranks it among the ten best vehicles to appear in Gerry Anderson productions.

===== Other pod vehicles =====
- Booster Mortar (a.k.a. the Thunderiser): a tracked vehicle with a cannon that can fire rescue packs through upper-floor windows to assist people trapped in tall buildings. Used in "Edge of Impact".
- DOMO (Demolition and Object Moving Operator): a restraint vehicle with three suction arms that, by using artificial gravity fields, can restrain or lift unstable structures or clear the disaster zone of heavy objects prior to the use of other pod vehicles. Used in "The Duchess Assignment", in which it is referred to as the "Restraining Outfit".
- Elevator Cars: built for use at airports to enable stricken aircraft to land safely by way of being manoeuvered beneath a plane to act as a substitute for landing gear. Used in "Trapped in the Sky".
- Excavator: a high-powered rock-crushing machine similar in design to the DOMO. It is used to clear rough terrain or unblock caves with people trapped inside, often being used for areas affected by landslides. Used in "Martian Invasion".
- Fire Tender: an adapted commercial vehicle that serves as a backup to the Firefly and Fire Truck.
- Fire Truck: a fire-fighting vehicle that shoots water, foam, and nitroglycerine shells to extinguish blazes. Used in "Security Hazard".
- Firefly: a fireproof vehicle used for demolition and fire-fighting work. Used in "City of Fire" and "Terror in New York City".
- Jet Air Transporter: an air-cushioned vehicle that uses a combination of high-power vertical turbo fans and anti-gravity technology to allow people jumping from buildings or structures to be caught safely and gently lowered to the ground. Used in "Move – and You're Dead".
- Laser Cutter Vehicle: a tracked vehicle similar in design to the Booster Mortar. Equipped with a powerful front-mounted laser that can gain precise and rapid entry to secure buildings such as vaults and bunkers. Used in "30 Minutes After Noon".
- Mobile Crane: a six-wheeled cherry picker vehicle used primarily to lift rescue personnel into tall structures. Used in "Path of Destruction".
- Monobrake: a low-slung search and recovery utility vehicle capable of either travelling along monorail tunnels or, by using its front-mounted telescopic arm, being attached to an overhead monorail line for greater speed. Used in "The Perils of Penelope".
- Neutraliser Tractor: a tracked mobile device used primarily to disable the radio control systems and electronics of explosive devices through the use of sonic waves. Used in "Move – and You're Dead".
- Recovery Vehicles: one crewed and one remote-controlled vehicle equipped with magnetic grappling lines to haul large objects out of lakes, rivers or pits. Used in "Pit of Peril".
- Thunderbird 4: though a Thunderbird in its own right, Thunderbird 4 usually transported to rescues in Pod 4 of Thunderbird 2. It is the most frequently seen of the pod vehicles.
- Transmitter Truck: adapted from a heavy-duty commercial vehicle and equipped with a dish that can transmit tractor beams and safety beams as well as communications and computer data to inaccessible locations. Used in "Sun Probe".

==== Thunderbird 6 ====
In the film Thunderbird 6 (1968), Jeff tasks Brains with designing a sixth Thunderbird vehicle. Brains sees all of his proposals rejected, but after Alan's restored de Havilland Tiger Moth plays a vital role in saving the occupants of the stricken airship Skyship One, he successfully pitches the biplane as the new "Thunderbird 6".

The reveal of the Tiger Moth as the "sixth" Thunderbird has drawn negative responses from some commentators. Stephen La Rivière argues that while the plot twist may have been appreciated by adult viewers, it would not have pleased the target audience of children, who had been "waiting for the most fantastic piece of hardware to arrive" only to end up with "an old plane". John Marriott also criticises this story development, commenting that "the big screen was an unsuitable place for the gentle irony of steam-age technology scoring triumphantly over an array of fantasy machines."

==== Thunderbird Shadow ====
Thunderbird Shadow
- First appearance: "Ring of Fire – Part 2" (2015)

General characteristics
- Armaments: Sonic cannon
- Propulsion: Gas turbine engines
- Power: Atomic fusion reactor

Thunderbird Shadow (or Thunderbird S) is an addition to International Rescue's fleet of vehicles in the remake series Thunderbirds Are Go. Black in colour, it is a highly agile, VTOL-capable hypersonic stealth aircraft piloted by the organisation's Chief of Security Kayo Kyrano. It is primarily used for covert operations related to protecting International Rescue as well as support for land and air-based rescues. The cockpit section doubles as a high-speed "Shadow Bike" motorcycle which can be dropped to the ground from the craft's fuselage when aerial pursuit becomes impractical while remaining in remote control contact. The ship features a pair of grappling claws in place of traditional landing gear, allowing it to perch on walls, ceilings, and other vehicles. The claws have also been used to carry cargo. Additionally, Thunderbird Shadow is equipped with electromagnetic cables, a sonic cannon, and stealth mode "optical camouflage" cloaking technology, allowing it to appear invisible to the naked eye and radar. It can also launch electronic disabling devices onto vehicles to take control of them when in range.

Thunderbird Shadow's launch area on Tracy Island is located on a rock outcrop in a hangar shared with Thunderbirds 1, 3 and 4. Once Kayo is geared up in her flight suit, she ascends to the main body of the ship in the Shadow Bike. The craft is then carried backwards on a turntable and up a wall via a rail. The turntable then rotates 180 degrees so the nose faces up, just as the wall flips round to take the ship outdoors (the exterior is disguised as a rock façade of the island). Thunderbird Shadow takes off from there.

==== Zero-XL ====
Introduced in the final episodes of Thunderbirds Are Go, the Zero-XL is a deep-space rescue vessel powered by a "T-Drive" engine. Designed and built by Brains and the Mechanic, its sole purpose is to travel to the Oort cloud to rescue Jeff Tracy. The Zero-XL acts as a carrier for the other Thunderbird air and space vehicles, comprising multiple docking ports that enable Thunderbirds 1, 2, 3, 5 and Shadow to be linked to it simultaneously.

==== Lady Penelope's vehicles ====
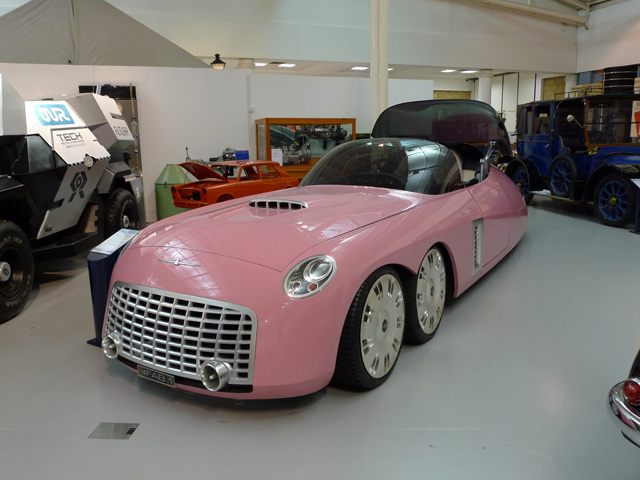
FAB 1's design from the 2004 film.

- FAB 1: a six-wheeled Rolls-Royce pink motor car used by Lady Penelope and her chauffeur, Parker. The car has an aircraft-style canopy and is fitted with many gadgets including a machine gun located behind the Rolls-Royce grille.
- FAB 2: Penelope's yacht, featured in "The Man from MI.5". Parker loses the vessel by gambling it away in a game of poker. It also makes an appearance in the Thunderbirds Are Go episode "Upside Down".
- FAB 0: a six-wheeled motor car that appears in the Thunderbirds Are Go episode "Designated Driver" as the vehicle that precedes FAB 1. It features propellers for flight housed in its wheels.

In the 2004 film, FAB 1 is a Thunderbird – a Ford Thunderbird – and can become an aircraft. Penelope also owns several pink Ford cars, at least one of which is named "FAB 8".

==== Miscellaneous ====
- Hover bikes: small personal transports that hover above the ground, used by all members of International Rescue. These vehicles are also seen in Anderson's earlier series Fireball XL5. They also make an appearance in the 2004 film and the Thunderbirds Are Go episode "Home on the Range".
- Ladybird Jet: Tin-Tin's jet seen in two episodes of Thunderbirds, and appears as a piece in the Thunderbirds game "Tracy Island" expansion pack.

== Other vehicles ==
=== Crablogger ===
Crablogger

General characteristics
- Maximum speed: 40 miles per hour (64 km/h)
- Mass: 435 tons
- Length: 342 feet (104 m)

This giant tree-felling machine is featured in "Path of Destruction". It is powered by a nuclear reactor, but its built-in wood processing plant requires the chemical fuel Superon. It was designed by Jim Lucas of Robotics International in England. The machine is equipped with two large grabbing arms and a central chainsaw which cuts trees at the base before feeding them into a processing plant, where they are reduced to wood pulp for collection by tanker trucks. Designed to clear areas of forest to make way for road developments, much of the Crablogger's systems are automated, although a crew is needed to monitor these systems. In "Path of Destruction", the crew are incapacitated by food poisoning, resulting in the machine going out of control.

Commentator Fred McNamara describes the Crablogger as "a perfect encapsulation of the world in which Thunderbirds [and other Century 21 series] were set", being an example of how those productions "used man's expansion of technological dreams in a future world as a platform for adventures filled with danger and excitement."

The Crablogger also features in the Thunderbirds Are Go episode "Firebreak", in which two children get trapped in it, in the middle of a forest fire.

=== Fireflash ===
The Fireflash, a hypersonic airliner, appears in "Trapped in the Sky", "Operation Crash-Dive", "The Impostors", "The Man from MI.5" and "The Duchess Assignment", as well as in a flashback sequence in "Security Hazard". It has six atomic motors that enable it to stay in the air for a maximum of six months; however, its radiation shielding must be maintained frequently, or the passengers can spend a maximum of only three hours in the aircraft before suffering fatal radiation sickness. Fireflash has two decks, but also features luxury facilities such as a cocktail lounge housed within glazed sections of the wings' leading edges. It was commissioned by Air Terrainean (a.k.a. Terrainean Airways).

The Fireflash gets its own eponymous episode in Thunderbirds Are Go, in which Brains is said to have rebuilt one, and Kayo goes on a flight, only to discover that the Hood is trying to steal it.

=== Helijets ===
Multi-purpose jet-powered VTOL aircraft, called "helijets", appear in various episodes. They are used by both civilian and military organisations. A range of designs are seen over the course of the series. Helijets also appear in subsequent Anderson puppet productions.

=== Sidewinder ===
Sidewinder

General characteristics
- Armaments: Missile launchers, pulse cannons
- Maximum speed: 50 miles per hour (80 km/h)
- Mass: 500 tons
- Length: 295 feet (90 m)
- Height: 100 feet (30 m)

A United States Army walking vehicle that appeared in "Pit of Peril". It resembles a giant beetle. Powered by an atomic reactor, the four-legged Sidewinder has two mechanical arms at the front which are used to uproot trees and remove other obstructions. The vehicle is operated by a crew of three from the cabin at the front. At 50 metres (160 ft) long and weighing over 500 tons, the Sidewinder is slow and lumbering, but is capable of crossing terrain inaccessible to other land vehicles. The vehicle was developed to prevent African "brushfire wars" from escalating into larger conflicts and is equipped with a significant amount of weaponry. During testing, the prototype vehicle falls into an unmapped landfill pit. Due to spontaneous combustion of the waste, the inside of the pit is extremely hot. Using the Thunderbird 2 Recovery Vehicles, International Rescue retrieves the Sidewinder and rescues its crew.

The look of the Sidewinder was devised by episode director Desmond Saunders. The filming model was built from wood and card, with chains of cake tins forming the arms. The model was held up on wires and incorporated an under-floor "scissor mechanism" for its leg movements. According to effects director Derek Meddings, these elements made the model very difficult to film.

Tom Fox of Starburst described the Sidewinder as a "great but hilariously awkward invention". Nick Ottens, of webzine Never Was, describes the Sidewinder as Thunderbirds' "weirdest" vehicle.

=== Sun Probe ===
Sun Probe

General characteristics
- Maximum speed: 30 miles (48 km) per second
- Propulsion: Chemical rockets, ion drive
- Mass: 2,580 tons
- Length: 363 feet (111 m)

The Sun Probe is a rocket sent to collect a sample from the Sun for research purposes. However, the radiation from the Sun causes the retrorockets to fail, resulting in it going on a collision course with the Sun until Thunderbird 3 is able to activate the rockets by remote. It first appears in the eponymous "Sun Probe" and (briefly) in the later-produced episode "The Perils of Penelope".

=== Zero-X ===
A metallic-blue spacecraft that made the first crewed landing on Mars. Zero-X first appeared in the Thunderbirds feature film, Thunderbirds Are Go, and later in the first episode of Captain Scarlet. It is assembled hours before launch and consists of five parts: the Martian Excursion Vehicle (MEV; later renamed the Martian Exploration Vehicle); the main fuselage; Lifting Body 1 and 2, two wing-like structures that are loaded with thruster packs and incorporate landing gear at the ends; and a reflective nose cone, which attaches to the MEV.
