= David Holliday =

American actor (1937–1999)

- Holliday in Coronation Street, 1973
- Born: August 4, 1937; Illinois, U.S.
- Died: March 26, 1999 (aged 61); Miami, Florida, U.S.
- Education: Carthage College
- Occupation: Actor
- Years active: 1964–1987
- Television: Thunderbirds
- Awards: 4 Carbonell Awards

David Holliday (August 4, 1937 – March 26, 1999) was an American Broadway actor and television voice actor. He is best known as the voice of Virgil Tracy, pilot of Thunderbird 2, in the first series (26 episodes) of Thunderbirds (1965–66).

== Career ==
=== Stage ===
Holliday's longest-running role on Broadway was that of Richard Kiley's alternate as Don Quixote in Man of La Mancha, playing Don Quixote in matinees and Dr Carrasco in the evening performances, from 1965 to 1971 (and later took on the role of the innkeeper in the 1992 revival). His next performance, as Georges in Coco, (1969 – 1970) earned him a Theatre World Award. He also appeared in the musicals Nevertheless They Laugh (Off Broadway 1971), Music Is (1976) and Perfectly Frank (1980).

In 1956 Holliday went to New York and auditioned for a part in West Side Story; he was given the minor role of Glad Hand, and to understudy Tony, in the London production. He then went on to play the lead role of Tony in the West End, during this time he met the young David Jason who was working as an electrician at the time doing work on his London flat and give him tickets to the show. The show also touring England, Scotland and Scandinavia, reprising this role again in 1963 and 1967 at the St. Louis Municipal Opera House. Holliday had two 1966 London Cast recordings to his credit; one with Jill Martin, and the other with Diane Todd, in the role of Maria. He would spend the next ten years commuting between Britain, Europe, the United States, and South Africa where he toured for six months in the role of Macheath in The Beggar's Opera.

In 1962 a phone call from, and a subsequent meeting with, British actor-director Noël Coward led to the role of John Van Mier in the London production of Sail Away at the Savoy Theatre, London, with Elaine Stritch reprising her Broadway role as Mimi Paragon; the London production ran for 265 performances.

1964 saw Holliday in the lead role of Edward Middleton in The Wayward Way, the musical version of The Drunkard, at the New Lyric Theatre, Hammersmith; the cast included Roberta D'Esti as Mary, Jim Dale as William Dowton, Cheryl Kennedy as Agnes Dowton, John Gower as the villainous Squire Cribbs, and Bernard Clifton as the landlord and Arden Rencelaw.

September 1965 saw him at the Olympia Theatre, Dublin, in the role of Dr Seward, in the musical Dearest Dracula, with John Gower as Dracula, Mary Millar as Lucy, Robert Hornery as Jonathan Harker, David Morton as Sir Arthur Holmwood, and Pitt Wilkinson as Dr Van Helsing.

In 1967, a meeting in New York with Danish actor-director Preben Kaas led to the role of Frank Butler in the Danish version of the musical Annie Get Your Gun, at the Falconer Theatre in Copenhagen (1967–68), with Daimi Gentle as Annie; this meant an intensive study in phonetics as the role required Holliday singing and speaking in Danish, the success of which can be heard on the Danish Cast recording on Metronome Records HLP 10304 (1968). The production ran for six months.

Later in 1968, and back once more in the United States, Holliday made his Melody Top - Milwaukee Summer Stock Theatre debut in "Fanny" and "Where's Charley". His many lead roles included: Tommy Albright in Brigadoon, 1973; Carl-Magnus in A Little Night Music, 1976; Woody Mahoney in Finian's Rainbow; Frank Butler in Annie Get Your Gun with Jo Anne Worley as Annie, 1982; and Emile De Becque in South Pacific, 1985. He also appeared many times with the Kenley Players; some of his roles were: as Tony in West Side Story with Anna Maria Alberghetti as Maria; as Robert Baker in Wonderful Town with Cloris Leachman as Ruth; as Edward Rutledge in 1776 (musical) with Joel Grey as John Adams; as Bill Sikes in Oliver! with Vincent Price as Fagin; as Beverly Carlton in The Man Who Came to Dinner with Jack Cassidy as Sheridan Whiteside; as Donald Marshall in Irene with Jane Powell in the lead role; and as Karl in Music in the Air with Giorgio Tozzi as Bruno.

Some of his non-singing roles include: Henry II in The Lion in Winter, a 1981 production at Stage Company of the Palm Beaches, West Palm Beach; Martin Dysart in Equus, 1982 production at Florida Atlantic University; in England he also toured as Starbuck in The Rainmaker, and Nick in Who's Afraid of Virginia Woolf?.

=== Television ===
Holliday also had several film and television credits, including the voice of Virgil Tracy, pilot of Thunderbird 2, in the first series (26 episodes) of Thunderbirds (1965–66). Holliday's other television credits include five episodes - aired in May 1973 - of the long-running British soap-opera Coronation Street, in which he played the character of Tom Schofield, great-nephew of Ena Sharples. Episodes #1286 (May 14), #1287 (May 16), #1288 (May 21), #1289 (May 23), and #1291 (May 30). Episode # 1289 appears on the Coronation Street 1973 Classic 8 Episodes DVD.

=== Awards ===
Holliday was a five-time nominee and four-time winner of the Carbonell Award for Best Actor in Musicals:

- 1979–80 Season: joint winner Man of La Mancha, Burt Reynolds Dinner Theatre (the other winner was Gregg Baker for Timbuktu!, Theatre of Performing Arts).
- 1980–81 Season: nominated for his performance in Camelot, Burt Reynolds Dinner Theatre.
- 1985–86 Season: winner for Berlin to Broadway with Kurt Weill, Coconut Grove Playhouse.
- 1992–93 Season: winner for Man of La Mancha and South Pacific, Jupiter Theatre.
- 1993–94 Season: winner for The Most Happy Fella, Jupiter Theatre.

== Death ==
Holliday died from cancer on March 26, 1999, at the age of 61.
