= Sylvia Anderson =

British producer (1927–2016)

- Anderson with the puppet of Dr Venus from Fireball XL5 (1962–63)
- Born: Sylvia Beatrice Thomas; 25 March 1927; Camberwell, London, England
- Died: 15 March 2016 (aged 88); Slough, Berkshire, England
- Education: London School of Economics
- Occupations: Television producer; film producer; writer; voice actress; costume designer
- Years active: 1957–2015
- Television: Supermarionation series, including Thunderbirds (1965–66)
- Board member of: Polytechnic Films/AP Films/Century 21/Group Three (1957–75)
- Spouses: Jack Brooks (m. 1946; div. 1950); George Thamm (m. 1952; div. 1959); Gerry Anderson (m. 1960; div. 1981)
- Children: 2
- Website: www.sylviaanderson.co.uk

Sylvia Beatrice Anderson (née Thomas; 25 March 1927 – 15 March 2016) was an English television and film producer, writer, voice actress and costume designer, best known for her collaborations with Gerry Anderson, her husband between 1960 and 1981.

In addition to serving as co-creator and co-writer on their TV series during the 1960s and early 1970s, Anderson's primary contribution was character development and costume design. She regularly directed the fortnightly voice recording sessions and provided the voices of many female and child characters. She also helped develop the shows and characters, in particular creating the iconic characters of Lady Penelope and Parker in Thunderbirds.

== Early life ==
Anderson was born in Camberwell, London, England on 25 March 1927. Her father, Sidney Thomas, was a champion boxer, and her mother, Beatrice (née Aberdeen), a dressmaker.

After graduating from the London School of Economics with a degree in sociology and political science, she became a social worker. She emigrated to the United States to live with her first husband, Jack Brooks, an American golfer. While in America she worked as a journalist.

== Career ==
Anderson returned to the United Kingdom in 1955 with her daughter. She joined the newly founded and short-lived Polytechnic Films as an office assistant in 1957. There, she met Gerry Anderson, an editor and director. That year, when Anderson and Arthur Provis created AP Films following Polytechnic's collapse, she joined them on the board of directors of the new company, alongside their colleagues John Read and Reg Hill.

=== Collaboration with Gerry Anderson ===
In 1957 AP Films was commissioned by writer Roberta Leigh to produce films based on her children's stories, including The Adventures of Twizzle and Torchy the Battery Boy. Sylvia Anderson worked on these projects as a production assistant. She married Gerry Anderson in late 1960 and developed a wider role in production duties.

The couple worked together as a team, co-writing and co-creating the first episode of a series and sharing the work according to their strengths. Gerry tended to specialise in special effects and hardware, and Sylvia in character, voices, costume, dialogue and plotlines.

In this way, Anderson contributed plot development and voice work for a series of half-hour shows including Supercar, Stingray and Fireball XL5. The Supercar end titles credit her (as Sylvia Thamm) as the dialogue director, a task that she would also handle in other projects. However, she felt the half-hour format was insufficient to fully develop characters and stories, so she persuaded the team's TV producer Lew Grade to extend their shows to a full hour.

In the early 1960s, the Andersons created the series Thunderbirds. Sylvia created the characters. She was aware that Grade intended to sell the show to American TV networks and wanted to make the show appealing to American audiences, so she introduced the "British aristocrat" character of Lady Penelope and Parker, her "Cockney chauffeur".

Lady Penelope Creighton-Ward, an aristocratic fashionista who was an undercover agent, was to become one of her most popular characters. Anderson both created the character and provided her voice. AP Films puppet designer Mary Turner used Anderson as the template for the creation of the Lady Penelope puppets, a decision of which Anderson was not immediately aware. Interviewed by the Daily Mirror in 1968, Turner commented: "we wanted a glamorous blonde and [Anderson] was the obvious choice." In 1966 and 1968, Anderson produced two feature-length films based on the Thunderbirds story, Thunderbirds Are Go and Thunderbird 6.

She was co-creator with Gerry Anderson for the series UFO (1969–1970) on which she co-produced, was responsible for fashions on the show and did the majority of the casting.

The Andersons' creative partnership ended when their marriage broke down during the production of the first series of Space: 1999 in 1975. Gerry announced his intention to separate on the evening of the wrap party, following which Sylvia ceased her involvement with the company, which by this time had twice been renamed and was now called Group Three.

=== Talent scout and writing ===
In 1983 she published a novel titled Love and Hisses and in 1994 she reprised her voice role as Lady Penelope for an episode of Absolutely Fabulous. She worked as a London-based talent scout for HBO for 30 years.

Her autobiography, Yes M'Lady, was first published in 1991; in 2007, it was re-published as My FAB Years with new material to bring it up to date with the latest developments in her life, such as her role as a production consultant for the 2004 live-action film adaptation of Thunderbirds.

Of the film, Anderson commented, "I'm personally thrilled that the production team have paid us the great compliment of bringing to life our original concept for the big screen. If we had made it ourselves (and we have had over 30 years to do it!) we could not have improved on this new version. It is a great tribute to the original creative team who inspired the movie all those years ago. It was a personal thrill for me to see my characters come to life on the big screen." My FAB Years was re-released as a spoken CD, narrated by Anderson, in 2010.

=== Late career and charity work ===
In 2013, Anderson worked with her daughter Dee, a jazz singer, on a concept for a new TV series named The Last Station.

In 2015, Anderson briefly returned to the Thunderbirds universe, when she guest-starred in an episode of the reboot TV series, Thunderbirds Are Go, as Great Aunt Sylvia, a relative of Lady Penelope.

Anderson was also known for her charity work, particularly in support of Breast Cancer Care and Barnardo's.

=== Recognition ===
In 1966, Thunderbirds received the Royal Television Society Silver Medal.

In 2015, Anderson travelled to Italy to receive a Pulcinella Award in recognition of her career in television production.

== Personal life ==
In 1946, Anderson married Jack Brooks, with whom she had a daughter, Dee. The marriage ended in divorce and in 1952 she married George Thamm, this marriage also ending in divorce. Her third marriage, in 1960, was to Gerry Anderson, with whom she had a son, Dr. Gerry Anderson Jr. (1967–2023), before divorcing Anderson in 1981.

Anderson died from an intracerebral haemorrhage at Wexham Park Hospital in Slough on 15 March 2016, aged 88.

== Television ==
=== AP Films ===
- The Adventures of Twizzle (1957–59) – production assistant
- Torchy the Battery Boy (first series) (1960) – production assistant
- Four Feather Falls (1960) – production assistant
- Supercar (1961–62) – dialogue director, voice artist
- Fireball XL5 (1962–63) – voice artist
- Stingray (1964–65) – production assistant, voice artist
- Thunderbirds (1965–66) – character development, voice artist

=== Century 21 ===
- Captain Scarlet and the Mysterons (1967–68) – character development, voice artist
- Joe 90 (1968–69) – character development, voice artist
- The Secret Service (1969) – character development, voice artist
- UFO (1970–71) – costume designer

=== Group Three ===
- The Protectors (1972–74) – writer
- Space: 1999 (1975–77) – producer ("Year One")

=== ITV Studios and Pukeko Pictures ===
- Thunderbirds Are Go (2015) – voice artist (as Great Aunt Sylvia)

== Filmography ==
- Crossroads to Crime (1960) – production assistant, uncredited acting role
- Thunderbirds Are Go (1966) – co-writer, co-producer, voice artist
- Thunderbird 6 (1968) – co-writer, co-producer, voice artist
- Doppelgänger (1969) a.k.a. Journey to the Far Side of the Sun (US title) – co-writer, co-producer
- Thunderbirds (2004) – production consultant
