= Reg Hill =

English Art Director, Model Maker, and Producer

- Hill on the set of Four Feather Falls in 1960
- Born: 16 May 1914; Wandsworth, Surrey, England, UK
- Died: 31 October 1999 (aged 85); Surrey, England, UK
- Occupations: Television producer, film and television production designer
- Years active: 1950s–1988
- Employer: Lew Grade
- Organization: AP Films

Reginald Eric Hill (16 May 1914 – 31 October 1999) was an English model-maker, art director, producer, and freelance storyboard artist. He is most prominently associated with the work of Gerry Anderson.

== Early life ==
Born on 16 May 1914, Hill started his working life during the 1930s in the display department of a London wholesale grocer before progressing to a role of advertising designer. He obtained a private pilot's licence in June 1939. Hill served in the Royal Air Force during the Second World War, spending time at Benson in Oxfordshire as an airframe fitter instructor.

== Post-war ==
After returning to civilian life, Hill joined National Interest Picture Productions as a designer for British Army, RAF and other government-made films, working as a model maker and animator. He also used his artistic and design skills as a commercial artist creating paper cut-out model books (three-dimensional flight aircraft and other working models), jigsaw puzzles and greeting cards. He was also responsible for the gunfire featured in the film The Dam Busters (1955), and more.

== Involvement with Gerry Anderson ==
In 1954, while working as an artist at Pentagon Films, Hill met Gerry Anderson, who had just formed, in partnership with Arthur Provis, the production company Anderson-Provis (AP) Films. Hill became the company's production designer. Initially based in Taplow, the new company produced a range of adverts for TV, including the "Blue Cars" advert starring Nicholas Parsons. During quiet periods, Reg worked on a number of other projects, including the TV series The Adventures of Robin Hood (1957), made at Walton Studios.

AP Films was approached by Roberta Leigh to produce animated programmes for TV, a collaboration that resulted in The Adventures of Twizzle and Torchy the Battery Boy towards the end of the 1950s. Hill worked in all things artistic, from set and puppet design to special effects. The collaboration with Leigh ended, and the production of new programs commenced, with Four Feather Falls, a Western featuring the voice of Nicholas Parsons as Sheriff Tex Tucker. During these early years, Hill was also involved in producing Anderson's low-budget film, Crossroads to Crime (1960).

== Employed by Lew Grade ==
In 1962, AP Films was bought by Associated Television director Lew Grade, and in 1966 was renamed "Century 21 Productions". Grade's purchase of AP Films was immediately followed by Supercar, for which Hill designed the characters, vehicles, and sets, and also wrote a number of episodes. This set the tone for future productions and Anderson's move into science-fiction adventure TV series.

A line of successful puppet and live-action TV series followed: Fireball XL5, Stingray, Thunderbirds, Captain Scarlet and the Mysterons, Joe 90, The Secret Service (which combined puppetry with live action), and UFO (produced mostly in live action). During this time, whilst taking on various roles as art director, producer and executive producer, Hill continued to be involved in series concepts and vehicle, character and set design.

Additionally, Hill contributed to the Thunderbirds films Thunderbirds Are Go (1966) and Thunderbird 6 (1968). He worked as a designer on Doppelgänger (1969), also known by the title Journey to the Far Side of the Sun.

In 1972, a new independent production company was formed named "Group 3 Productions" (named after its three founders: Gerry Anderson, Sylvia Anderson, and Hill), which developed and produced The Protectors and Space: 1999. The company later evolved into "Gerry Anderson Productions" in 1975 for the production of the second season of Space: 1999.

== Later years ==
In 1977, following the completion of the second series of Space: 1999, Gerry Anderson Productions was dissolved. Hill entered semi-retirement, but continued to work as a storyboard artist on a range of films including Pink Floyd – The Wall, Sky Bandits, Outland, Octopussy, The Last Days of Pompeii, Supergirl, Superman and Superman II. He died in Surrey in 1999, aged 85.

== Bibliography ==
- Bignell, Jonathan (2011), "Anything Can Happen in the Next Half-Hour: Gerry Anderson's Transnational Science Fiction", in Hochscherf, Tobias; Leggott, James (eds.), British Science Fiction Film and Television: Critical Essays, McFarland & Company, pp. 73–84, ISBN 978-0-7864-4621-6
