= Space Patrol (1962 TV series) =

1960s British science fiction television series

- Also known as: Planet Patrol
- Genre: Children's science fiction
- Created by: Roberta Leigh
- Written by: Roberta Leigh
- Directed by: Frank Goulding
- Voices of: Dick Vosburgh; Libby Morris; Ysanne Churchman; Ronnie Stevens; Murray Kash
- Composer: Fred Judd
- Country of origin: United Kingdom
- Original language: English
- No. of series: 1
- No. of episodes: 39

Production
- Producers: Roberta Leigh; Arthur Provis
- Cinematography: Arthur Provis
- Editors: John Beaton; Roy Hyde; Len Walter
- Running time: 25 minutes
- Production companies: National Interest Pictures; Wonderama Productions for ABC Weekend TV

Original release
- Network: ITV
- Release: 7 April 1963 – 11 June 1964

Space Patrol is a British science fiction television series featuring marionettes that was produced in 1962 and first broadcast on ABC Weekend TV from 7 April 1963. Comprising 39 half-hour episodes, it was written and produced by Roberta Leigh in association with ABC. It features the voices of Dick Vosburgh, Ronnie Stevens, Libby Morris, Murray Kash and Ysanne Churchman.

The marionettes used in the series incorporated some elements of Gerry Anderson's Supermarionation technique – specifically, their mouths would move in sync with dialogue. Leigh had worked with Anderson on the children's series The Adventures of Twizzle and Torchy the Battery Boy, but Anderson did not develop Supermarionation until after his association with Leigh ended. Although there are similarities between Space Patrol and Anderson's Fireball XL5, Space Patrol was made on a lower budget.

The series is also known by its US title Planet Patrol to avoid confusion with the 1950s American series of the same name.

== Premise ==
In the year 2100, the indigenous and autonomous civilisations on Earth, Mars and Venus have banded together to form the United Galactic Organization (UGO). Space Patrol is the UGO's military wing, and the series follows the actions of this interplanetary force, focusing on the missions of a tiny unit led by the heroic, bearded Captain Larry Dart (voiced by Dick Vosburgh). The humanoids on his crew are two males: the elfin Slim from Venus, and the stocky, ravenously sausage-mad Husky from Mars (both voiced by Ronnie Stevens). Dart and his crew regularly use one of two interplanetary space vehicles, the Galasphere 347 and the Galasphere 024.

Providing technical support from Earth is an Irish professor, Aloysius O'Brien O'Rourke Haggarty (voiced by Stevens) – to his constant dismay, called "Pop" by his daughter Cassiopeia (voiced by Libby Morris). Haggarty's garrulous pet "gabblerdictum" (a parrot-like Martian creature, also voiced by Morris) accompanies the crew on rare occasions. Keeping them all on a tight rein are Colonel Raeburn (voiced by Murray Kash) and his super-efficient female Venusian secretary, Marla (voiced by Morris), both also based on Earth.

Male Venusians (such as Slim) have androgynous features, in contrast with the more rustic and virile male Martians. Although the series reflects gender roles characteristic of the culture and era that produced it, the blonde and brainy Marla often points out that "There are no dumb blondes on Venus." Indeed, the series was created and written by Roberta Leigh, the first woman producer in Britain to have her own film company.

=== Setting ===
The characters consistently and erroneously refer to the Solar System as a "galaxy" (except in the episode "The Talking Bell", when "Solar System" is used). Other star systems are referred to as "other galaxies". The planets of the Solar System are under the administration of Galactic Control.

The Galasphere is constructed of plutonite (a material mined from Pluto) and can travel underwater. It runs on "meson power" and has a top speed of about 800,000 miles per hour (1,300,000 km/h). Meson power is dangerous to use in an atmosphere. In "The Talking Bell", the crew initiate "Boost Speed", which is dangerous but allows them to travel at almost one million miles per hour (1,600,000 km/h) for a sustained period. The Galasphere's engine also employs gamma rays and "yobba rays". The ship is equipped with a force field that protects it from enemy missiles or even mind control. Because of technological limitations, travel to other Solar System planets takes weeks or months. Therefore, the characters transfer control of the Galasphere to a robot and are placed in suspended animation for each journey. A faster-than-light zirgon ray can be fired from Earth to revive them early if needed.

In "The Rings of Saturn" and some other episodes, the crew ride the Galasphere 024 rather than the Galasphere 347. References to Galasphere 024 are, for the most part, continuity errors introduced by the repeated re-use of stock footage from the first episode, "The Swamps of Jupiter". Although referred to as "024" during takeoff, the Galasphere's designation often reverts to "347" later in the same episode.

Life support in hazardous atmospheres is provided by "mo-lungs" ("mobile lungs"): sealed, cylindrical, transparent helmets. However, characters are also shown on Pluto and other bodies without spacesuits or thermal gear. They ride on "Hover Jets" or, more rarely, an "Ion Gun", which resembles a giant sparkler. To communicate with aliens, they use dial-selector translators (for example, to address aliens from Pluto, they dial P). The translators do not pick up new languages instantly. Instead, they have to be programmed on Earth before they can be used, a lengthy process requiring recordings of alien languages.

== Episodes ==
No.	Title	Directed by	Written by	Original release date
1	"The Swamps of Jupiter"	Frank Goulding	Roberta Leigh	TBA
Captain Dart and his crew are sent to investigate the loss of contact with a scientific base on Jupiter and encounter Martian fur trappers who are killing the local Loomi creatures for their heat-retaining skins.
2	"The Wandering Asteroid"	Frank Goulding	Roberta Leigh	TBA
The Space Patrol crew accept a dangerous mission to destroy an asteroid deflected from its orbit by a cometary collision and heading directly for the Martian capital of Wotan.
3	"The Dark Planet"	Frank Goulding	Roberta Leigh	TBA
Professor Haggerty and his daughter Cassiopeia are baffled by a plant sample from Uranus with a mind of its own! Following the disappearance of a 20-strong survey team on Uranus, Colonel Raeburn dispatches the Space Patrol crew to locate larger versions of the plant, where they discover the adult specimens of the plant are far from friendly.
4	"The Slaves of Neptune"	Frank Goulding	Roberta Leigh	TBA
The crew of the Galasphere are sent to solve the mystery of a spaceship sending colonists to Pluto which disappeared near Neptune. On approach to Neptune, Dart, Slim and Husky fall under the hypnotic influence of Neptunian overlord Tyro who is using his powers to trap Earth colonists as slaves.
5	"The Fires of Mercury"	Frank Goulding	Roberta Leigh	TBA
Professor Haggerty's device for translating the language of ants also converts heat waves into radio waves. Marla realises that this might provide a way of transmitting warmth from Mercury to the Colony on Pluto, where freezing conditions worsen as the planet nears the point in its orbit farthest from the Sun.
6	"The Shrinking Spaceman"	Frank Goulding	Roberta Leigh	TBA
When the Galasphere crew are sent to repair the sonar beam transmitter on the asteroid Pallas, Husky succumbs to a mysterious shrinking disease after cutting his hand on a rock. Keeping him in suspended animation, Professor Haggerty attempts to find a cure.
7	"The Robot Revolution"	Frank Goulding	Roberta Leigh	TBA
When an undersea eruption at the Atlantic sea farm damages robot workers, Space Headquarters is overrun by the rampaging machines, determined to seize control of the city.
8	"The Cloud of Death"	Frank Goulding	Roberta Leigh	TBA
A cloud of metallic particles plunges the Earth into darkness. The work of Neptunian leader Tyro, he threatens to freeze the Earth unless Raeburn agrees to send human slaves to work for the Neptunians.
9	"The Rings of Saturn"	Frank Goulding	Roberta Leigh	TBA
Observing Saturn, Dart and his crew notice a meteor shadowing the Galasphere. On discovering it is actually a Saturnian spacecraft, Dart makes contact and brings a tape of Saturnian language back to Earth for decoding. When contact is finally made with the planet, it transpires that Dart has inadvertently offended the Saturnian by picking leaves off their sacred tree.
10	"Volcanoes of Venus"	Frank Goulding	Roberta Leigh	TBA
A virus is paralysing areas of Venus. Raeburn learns that Slim's uncle Gallia intends to seize power by releasing into the air a powder that causes the paralysis. Slim is sent to Venus to investigate, but contacts Space Headquarters to announce that he has changed allegiance and will assist his uncle...back to his mother ship.
11	"Mystery on the Moon"	Frank Goulding	Roberta Leigh	TBA
From a base on the Moon, Berridge threatens Space Headquarters with destruction by laser beam unless Raeburn agrees to send him a freighter full of gold. Dart is sent to Moon Station One to investigate and discovers an artificial crater.
12	"The Miracle Tree of Saturn"	Frank Goulding	Roberta Leigh	TBA
A fungus is destroying crops at an alarming rate. By chance Professor Haggarty discovers a cutting from the Saturnian's sacred tree on Raeburn's desk destroys the fungus and Dart is dispatched to Saturn to obtain further supplies. However, their plan has been overheard by an unscrupulous technician.
13	"The Forgers"	Frank Goulding	Roberta Leigh	TBA
Colonel Raeburn is baffled by a sudden influx of forged currency while Dart and his crew take it upon themselves to investigate what appears to be a disease killing the vegetation on Mars. Dart and Husky stumble across the source of the forgeries...
14	"The Planet of Thought"	Frank Goulding	Roberta Leigh	TBA
Tyro has come to Earth with a view to joining the UGO but is sidetracked when he catches sight of Marla. Using his hypnotic powers, Tyro returns to Neptune with Marla where he makes her his princess. Dart follows them to discover a way to break the spell.
15	"The Glowing Eggs of Titan"	Frank Goulding	Roberta Leigh	TBA
Husky's discovery of a luminous egg on the Saturnian moon of Titan could prove to be the solution to the Martian energy crisis. While Dart and his crew are on an egg-gathering mission, Slim falls and damages his air line. As he waits to be rescued he hears a strange humming...
16	"The Planet of Light"	Frank Goulding	Roberta Leigh	TBA
Dart and Slim are invited to the planet of Lumen, which orbits Sirius. On their arrival Dart's oxygen cylinder is pierced. The planet's only oxygen comes from blister plants in the "cave of death". Dart and Slim must find the plants before dawn, or risk being boiled alive in the heat of the Sun...
17	"Time Stands Still"	Frank Goulding	Roberta Leigh	TBA
Stolen art treasures are being transported into space. Raeburn suspects that Venusian millionaire Tara is behind the thefts, but his palace is too well guarded. Professor Haggarty develops a watch that speeds up the wearer's reaction times by a factor of sixty, which enables Dart to sneak into the palace unnoticed.
18	"Husky Becomes Invisible"	Frank Goulding	Roberta Leigh	TBA
When Dart is sent to Mars to find the eggs of the Aba bird to help find a cure for a condition known as the "floats", he calls on Professor Zeller who has discovered that his new star-measuring apparatus can make objects disappear.
19	"The Walking Lake of Jupiter"	Frank Goulding	Roberta Leigh	TBA
Scientists Dr Brown and Dr Smith discover that water from a Jovian lake has the power to cause inanimate objects to move as if with a life of their own. Dart arrives to witness the phenomenon and ends up on the trail of the unfortunate Brown, whose spacesuit has become energised by the Jovian water.
20	"The New Planet"	Frank Goulding	Roberta Leigh	TBA
Galasphere 347 is in deep space. After a comet collides with the ship, Dart and his crew discover a new planet beyond the orbit of Pluto. Touching down in the dense forest, Dart and Slim meet one of the planet's giant inhabitants.
21	"The Human Fish"	Frank Goulding	Roberta Leigh	TBA
The Tula Fish in the Venusian Magda Ocean are evolving at an extraordinary rate and attack fishermen. The Galasphere crew are sent to help and discover that routinely dumped building materials may be the cause of the Tula's accelerated evolution.
22	"The Invisible Invasion"	Frank Goulding	Roberta Leigh	September 26, 1963
On Uranus, the Duos are planning to seize power on Earth by taking over the minds of everyone at Space Headquarters, including Colonel Raeburn. The one person seemingly unaffected by the Duos' power is Professor Haggarty, who is installed beneath his electronic hair-restorer!
23	"The Talking Bell"	Frank Goulding	Roberta Leigh	TBA
On a hunting trip, Raeburn and Haggarty encounter a soft, bell-shaped object with a single extensible leg. It is a visitor from another planet, but Raeburn has accidentally shot its space vehicle down with his 12-bore! Dart is assigned to return "Mr Bell" to his mothership.
24	"The Buried Spaceship"	Frank Goulding	Roberta Leigh	TBA
"Operation Ice Cube" is put into action when Marla suggests moving ice through space as a solution to a drought problem on Mars. Galasphere 347 is sent to assist but develops a fault in the Meson Power Unit forcing the craft to land for repairs...
25	"Message from a Star"	Frank Goulding	Roberta Leigh	TBA
Signals from Alpha Centauri suggest intelligent life but it would take a Galasphere 3,000 years to cross the immense distance. Irya, a being from the planet Delta, teleports himself to Earth to fit a special power unit to the Galasphere, enabling it to travel at faster-than-light speeds. Professor Haggarty, however, has reservations about making the trip.
26	"Explosion on the Sun"	Frank Goulding	Roberta Leigh	TBA
An explosion on the surface of Sun causes a temperature rise on Earth and Venus. The Venusian president is contacted by Dr Duncan, who has been causing the explosions by firing a freighter of beryllium into the Sun. He threatens to release further charges unless Earth and Venus send weapons and robots to Ganymede.
27	"The Unknown Asteroid"	Frank Goulding	Roberta Leigh	TBA
The problem of dwindling supplies of Plutonite is solved when an asteroid made of the material is discovered. But before Raeburn has managed to secure the asteroid Miga, a wealthy Venusian has taken possession and intends to sell it. Raeburn reluctantly agrees to the asking price and sends Dart to complete the transaction.
28	"The Evil Eye of Venus"	Frank Goulding	Roberta Leigh	TBA
Professor Borra of Venus has invented a mechanical eye which can destroy any ship constructed of metal alien to Earth, Mars or Venus. The demonstration is impressive but what will happen when a Galasphere constructed from metal mined from Pluto comes within range?
29	"Secret Formula"	Frank Goulding	Roberta Leigh	TBA
Exploring the Silver Forest of Venus, Husky becomes trapped in the web of a Spirigum Spider. Haggarty manages to free him and discovers that fragments of the web act as a truth drug. Raeburn, meanwhile, is offered the formula for Kinotine, which has the ability to store heat indefinitely. Kinotine's inventor, Dr Mason, will donate the formula but when a call is received from Kolig, head of Mars's largest chemical plant, offering the formula for sale, Raeburn suspects foul play.
30	"The Telepathic Robot"	Frank Goulding	Roberta Leigh	TBA
Haggarty invents a robot that responds to thoughts. Dart tests the range of telepathic thought in space and investigates a new planet near the Sun unaware that the Neptunians have encamped there. Only Haggarty's new robot escapes the Neptunians' hypnotic influence.
31	""Deadly Whirlwind"	Frank Goulding	Roberta Leigh	TBA
To halt a virus destroying Martian vegetation, Dart is sent with a spray that is deadly to all forms of life except those native to Mars. When the spray comes into contact with a whirlwind, the chemical is rushed into space and is soon on a collision course with Earth.
32	"The Jitter Waves"	Frank Goulding	Roberta Leigh	TBA
A strange jittering is affecting the city and other Earth locations. Haggarty discovers, by chance, that the jittering is caused by radio waves emitted by Uranus, where the Duos are once again planning an invasion.
33	"Sands of Death"	Frank Goulding	Roberta Leigh	TBA
Tyrig plans to use a nerve gas to seize power on Mars. Raeburn discovers that Tyrig and his men have set up base on the Martian moon Phobos and Dart is sent to investigate. Dart and his crew are captured by Tyrig, who wants to use the Galasphere to spread the gas. Refusing to co-operate they are placed in a dungeon which slowly fills with sand.
34	"The Hairy Men of Mars"	Frank Goulding	Roberta Leigh	TBA
The Galasphere's Meson unit malfunctions and lands in the unexplored Tuhera jungle. Dart and Husky leave to fix the problem. When Husky fails to return, Dart follows and is captured by a giant primitive man. Husky speaks with the giant in its native language and they are set free. They return to Earth with some Martian fruit which makes hair grow—the perfect solution to Haggarty's problem.
35	"The Grass of Saturn"	Frank Goulding	Roberta Leigh	TBA
Saturn has a new leader. Riga is succeeded by his brother Simba and while Dart is en route to investigate, Simba launches rockets destined for Earth containing Saturnian grass seed—which absorbs oxygen and carbon dioxide.
36	"Force Field X"	Frank Goulding	Roberta Leigh	TBA
The Neptunians create a forcefield around the Earth containing particles with strong electromagnetic properties. The field begins disrupting electricity supplies, causing a complete blackout.
37	"The Water Bomb"	Frank Goulding	Roberta Leigh	TBA
The Galasphere is sent on a rain-making mission to Mars with a cargo of oxygen and hydrogen—the very ingredients escaped criminal Marog requires to complete his bomb under construction at his Phobos hideaway.
38	"Destruction by Sound"	Frank Goulding	Roberta Leigh	TBA
Raeburn is contacted by Yria from Alpha Centauri who is seeking help to destroy an evil computer superbrain which is attempting to take over the planet Delta.
39	"The Shrinking Gas of Jupiter"	Frank Goulding	Roberta Leigh	TBA
On a mission to Jupiter, Slim disappears in the swamps. Raeburn orders Dart and Husky to leave but trouble with the Galasphere's primary drives gives Dart an excuse to resume the search only to find that Slim has shrunk to dwarf-like proportions.

== Production ==
Space Patrol was filmed in converted church buildings in Stoke Newington and Harlesden, London. Arthur Provis, Gerry Anderson's former business partner, was responsible for the cinematography. The production was completed in two blocks consisting of 26 and 13 episodes, which together make up a single series. The final 13 episodes employ refurbished puppets and sets, and are copyrighted "1962 Wonderama Productions" in the closing credits (the first 26 episodes display no copyright information).

Various puppets from the series were re-used in later Leigh productions including Wonderboy and Tiger and Send for Dithers. These colour films reveal that the Gabblerdictum bird was bright pink. Other than two end papers from the 1966 TV Comic Annual, no colour photographs from the series have survived. The TV Comic images indicate that the puppets were dressed in monochromatic uniforms, though most comic and book illustrations depict them as red and silver.

The series' only music is avant-garde, the theme music being devised by Leigh herself using electronic equipment that she bought locally after asking an assistant for anything that made interesting sounds. Fred Judd was responsible for creating all the electronic music for the series; he was an early electronic experimenter, amateur radio expert, circuit designer, and writer for many wireless and electronics magazines from the 1950s to the 1990s.

The closing credits, which present panoramic views over a megacity of the future, do not feature music. Instead, they are accompanied by a throb of industrial machinery (sounding like a giant pump or a steam engine). They list Colin Ronan as a "space consultant".

== Broadcast ==
The various ITV franchises began airing the series on different dates. Episodes were not necessarily shown in a particular order. In some parts of the UK, the series was split into blocks of episodes that were transmitted weeks or months apart. ABC Weekend TV was the first to start broadcasting the series, from Sunday 7 April 1963. However, it took more than four years to air all 39 episodes.

In the London area, Space Patrol was shown on Thursdays at 5.25 pm by Associated-Rediffusion (A-R) beginning on 5 July 1963. A-R screened the first 26 episodes in random order, beginning with "The Wandering Asteroid". It then aired the final 13 episodes in the correct order, the last ten of them after shortening its name to "Rediffusion". It concluded the run on 11 June 1964, becoming the first ITV franchise to do so.

The series continued to be shown on parts of the ITV network until 1970. After this, it went unseen for more than 50 years, until nostalgia channel Talking Pictures TV began showing repeats in 2024.

=== International ===
The series was sold overseas and broadcast in the US, Canada and Australia. Despite its low budget, it rated strongly with young audiences in many regions (including New York City) and gained a large fan following. Babylon 5 creator J. Michael Straczynski has said that it was his favourite TV show as a child.

In the US, the series was distributed by M & A Alexander Productions. It debuted on WPIX, a local New York station, on Sunday, 12 January 1964, at 5:30 pm. It was sponsored by Drake's Cakes. The show appeared in Los Angeles in September 1964 on KHJ-TV.

Space Patrol was also broadcast in Malta.

Starting in 2025, it was broadcast in the Netherlands on the channel ONS.

== Home media ==
For many years it was believed that all but a few episodes had been destroyed, until a complete cache of 16 mm prints was discovered in the garage of Leigh's home. Despite their scratched and grainy condition, they were of sufficient historic interest to warrant a commercial release, initially on VHS, and later on DVD. Two episodes have survived from the original 35 mm prints and these were later made available on Blu-ray.

=== DVD ===
A "best of" DVD release appeared in 2001, comprising six episodes: "The Swamps of Jupiter", "The Wandering Asteroid", "The Robot Revolution", "The Rings of Saturn," "Husky Becomes Invisible" and "Mystery on the Moon", including transfers of the two 35 mm episodes and other special features.

The definitive DVD release, released in 2004, is a six-disc PAL Region 0 box set in containing all 39 episodes with a range of extras.

==== Episodes ====
===== Disc 1 =====
- "The Swamps of Jupiter"
- "The Wandering Asteroid"
- "The Dark Planet"
- "The Slaves of Neptune"
- "The Shrinking Spaceman"
- "The Forgers"

===== Disc 2 =====
- "The Robot Revolution"
- "The Rings of Saturn"
- "Husky becomes Invisible"
- "The Buried Spacecraft"
- "Mystery on the Moon"
- "The Glowing Eggs of Titan"
- "The Walking Lake of Jupiter"

===== Disc 3 =====
- "Time Stands Still"
- "Message from a Star"
- "The Fires of Mercury"
- "The Invisible Invasion"
- "The New Planet"
- "The Human Fish"

===== Disc 4 =====
- "The Planet of Light"
- "The Talking Bell"
- "The Miracle Tree of Saturn"
- "The Cloud of Death"
- "The Planet of Thought"
- "Explosion on the Sun"
- "Volcanoes of Venus"

===== Disc 5 =====
- "The Unknown Asteroid"
- "The Evil Eye of Venus"
- "Secret Formula"
- "The Telepathic Robot"
- "Deadly Whirlwind"
- "The Jitter Waves"
- "Sands of Death"

===== Disc 6 =====
- "The Hairy Men of Mars"
- "The Grass of Saturn"
- "Forcefield X"
- "The Water Bomb"
- "Destruction by Sound"
- "The Shrinking Gas of Jupiter"

==== Special features ====
- Sara and Hoppity episode
- Roberta Leigh interview
- National Interest Pictures brochure
- The Adventures of Twizzle episode
- Arthur Provis interview
- Dick Vosburgh Interview
- Mr Hero pilot
- J. Michael Straczynski interview
- Commercial break bumpers
- Paul Starr pilot
- Andy Partridge interview
- Send for Dithers episode (also in 3-disc set)
- Wonder Boy & Tiger episode (also in 3-disc set)
- The Solarnauts pilot

=== Blu-ray ===
In March 2018, Network Distributing announced that a region-free Blu-ray box set of the complete series, restored using the latest technology, would be released on 2 April of that year. There are no subtitles or special features.

=== Other media ===
A small number of Space Patrol episodes were made available in the Standard 8 and Super 8 home movie formats from Mountain Films in the 1960s and 1970s. Episodes known to have been released in this format are: "The Swamps of Jupiter", "The Miracle Tree of Saturn", "The Robot Revolution" and "Mystery on the Moon." The films were released in 400' sound editions, and packaging for all titles used the same artwork as the first release, "Mystery on the Moon." The title Space Patrol did not appear anywhere on the packaging. The films were all around 16 minutes long, with most of the material coming from the second act of the episodes. The complete series was released by Network on VHS following the recovery of the episodes in the late 1990s.

== Comics ==
A number of comic strip adaptations of Space Patrol were produced:

- TV Comic: 52 double-page strips forming the centrespread of each issue, in issue no's 668 dated 3 October 1964 to 719 dated 25 September 1965. They were written by Roberta Leigh herself and illustrated by artist Bill Mevin, and in colour it was shown that Venusians had blue skin and Martians green.
- The Beezer: from issue 558 dated 24 September 1966 to issue 583 dated 18 March 1967, illustrated by artist Terry Patrick (i.e. 26 2-page colour episodes in total).
- Two Gold Token Super Mag comic books published in UK by Young World Productions Ltd. See issue 12 dated June 1964 and issue 24 dated December 1964. Young World Productions published two issues of Gold Token Super Mag every month featuring various licensed properties
- A World Distributors hardback story book with two text stories by Roberta Leigh featuring illustrations by R. W. Smethurst. Title: Space Patrol and the Secret Weapon, copyright 1965 by Wonderama Productions Ltd.
