= The Adventures of Twizzle =

British children's TV series (1957–1959)

- Also known as: Twizzle
- Genre: Children's; Fantasy; Adventure
- Written by: Roberta Leigh
- Directed by: Gerry Anderson
- Voices of: Nancy Nevinson; Denise Bryer
- Narrated by: Nancy Nevinson
- Music by: Leslie Clair, arranged and conducted by Barry Gray; Lyrics: Roberta Leigh
- Country of origin: United Kingdom
- Original language: English
- No. of series: 1
- No. of episodes: 52 (51 missing)

Production
- Producer: Roberta Leigh
- Cinematography: Arthur Provis
- Editor: David Elliott
- Running time: 13 minutes
- Production companies: Banty Books Productions; AP Films
- Budget: £23,400

Original release
- Network: ITV
- Release: 13 November 1957 – 10 June 1959

The Adventures of Twizzle is a British children's puppet television series produced by AP Films (APF) which premiered on the ITV network in 1957. Created and co-produced by author Roberta Leigh, it was filmed in Maidenhead between July 1957 and January 1958 on a budget of £23,400 (about £490,000 in 2025).

Twizzle was the first series to use the marionette puppetry that would prove important in later shows developed by APF. The series follows a toy doll called Twizzle, who has the ability to extend his arms and legs. He is joined on various adventures by a cat called Footso and several other toy companions. The characters were operated on carpet thread strings and had heads of papier-mâché.

Fifty-two 13-minute episodes were filmed, with APF completing one episode every two days. The opening episode, "Twizzle and Footso", was first broadcast on 13 November 1957 by ITV's London franchise, Associated-Rediffusion, and aired its last episode on 10 June 1959. The series also aired on the ABC network in Australia. All episodes except the first are now lost. The sole surviving episode is included in the Space Patrol DVD box set.

== Overview ==
Twizzle's legs looked like drinking straws with lines around them in a swirling pattern and appear to extend up into his body with the "Twizzle" effect happening when the puppet body is raised while the feet are not. In the first episode, Twizzle originally lived in a toy shop and cost two shillings and six pence (12.5p) and was nearly sold to a naughty girl named Sally Cross but he hid and escaped that night before the child returned the following day to buy him. He travelled some distance and the next night hid in a dog kennel where he found Footso, a cat who had run away from home as the children made fun of his big feet.

Twizzle proved useful in a fire by saving a child on a high window when no ladder was available, for which he was given a racing car as a reward, but after crashing it he swapped it for a breakdown truck which he uses for rescuing toys. Footso had large feet which sometimes trip him up, hence his name. Later came Jiffy the Broomstick Man (a cross between a broom made of twigs and a suit wearing man who could sweep the floor on his own) who Twizzle and Footso rescued from the clutches of a stereotypical evil witch (who had threatened to burn him) when he flew up the chimney to escape her. The witch returned in a later episode and there was another narrow escape by all. Jiffy could fly by lying horizontal and would fly other people out of trouble. Twizzle and Footso built Straytown where stray toys (misfits) could live and lived in a cabin there. This theme was later carried over to Torchy the Battery Boy. Both ideas bear a resemblance to Peter Pan and Neverneverland.

All had their songs which were entertaining time-wasters, with Footso "dreaming of herrings and kippers and creamy cream" after which he would say "Purr! Purr! Purr! Meowwll!", the latter loudly and then the show would continue (a theme Anderson later carried into Four Feather Falls). The songs were written by Roberta Leigh. There was also Chawky the white faced Golliwog who would complain: "Who wants a white-faced Golliwog?" and Candy Floss, a "Mamma Doll" who could not say "mamma" as well as Bouncy, a ball who had lost his bounce. There was also a thin Teddy Bear as well as a China Doll and a Jack in the Box. An occasional visitor to Straytown was The Toy Inspector who would check on the toys living there.

== Production ==
The series was the first major commission for Anderson Provis Films (AP Films or APF), founded by Gerry Anderson and Arthur Provis in mid-1957. It had been conceived as a puppet show by Roberta Leigh, who contracted APF to make 52 episodes budgeted at £450 each (about £9,430 in 2025). Actress Denise Bryer, the voice of Footso and other characters, previously voiced Noddy in a series of puppet TV advertisements produced by Anderson and Provis.

A co-production between APF and Leigh's company Banty Books, Twizzle was filmed in a converted ballroom at Islet Park House in Maidenhead. To challenge audiences' preconceptions that puppet shows favoured static cameras and flat backgrounds, the production consciously incorporated dynamic shots and three-dimensional sets. The marionettes were operated from a bridge several feet above the studio floor. During filming, the puppeteers' actions were guided by a form of video assist that involved pairing the shooting camera with a slave camera which flopped the live picture and relayed it to a nearby TV monitor.

Crew members included art director Reg Hill and his assistant Derek Meddings, puppet operator Christine Glanville, cameraman John Read and continuity supervisor Sylvia Thamm. Thamm, Read and Hill later became company co-directors in APF. The music was devised by Leigh, Leslie Clair and Barry Gray, with Gray scoring melodies that Clair or Lee had performed on tape. The sound mixing was done by Grosvenor Road Studios.

== Annual ==
There was a British annual brought out in 1960 by Brin Brothers Ltd, called More Twizzle Adventure Stories, "The lovable T.V. character by Roberta Leigh". It had 91 pages of text stories and comic style stories (18 of them with the one page introduction). Illustrations were by F. Woof. Apart from the covers and frontispiece which are in full colour, the rest of the illustrations are black and white with one other colour (red, orange, blue or green). The annual is printed on cheap cardboard-like paper and is now very rare although it is not sought after by collectors.
