= Hoppity =

Hoppity may refer to:

- Hoppity, a British board game of the 19th century, which was the inspiration for Halma
- "Hoppity", a poem by A.A. Milne collected in When We Were Very Young
- Hoppity, a toy in the 1960s British puppet TV series Sara and Hoppity
- Hoppity the Grasshopper, the main character in the 1941 American animated film Mr. Bug Goes to Town
- Hoppity Hooper, an American animated TV series of the 1960s

== See also ==
- Space hopper, also known as hoppity hop, a rubber ball toy
