= Derek Meddings =

British special effects designer and technician (1931–1995)

- Meddings in 1966
- Born: 15 January 1931; St Pancras, London, UK
- Died: 10 September 1995 (aged 64); Buckinghamshire, England, UK
- Occupations: Special effects designer and technician
- Years active: 1950s–1995
- Employer: AP Films (1957–1970)
- Organization: The Magic Camera Company
- Known for: James Bond films Superman films Thunderbirds
- Television: Supermarionation productions
- Spouses: Anne S. Dodge (1953–?); Alexe Anne Inglis (1972–?)
- Children: 6
- Awards: Special Achievement Academy Award (1979); BAFTA Michael Balcon Award (1979)

Derek Meddings (15 January 1931 – 10 September 1995) was a British film and television special effects designer. He was initially noted for his work on the "Supermarionation" TV puppet series produced by Gerry Anderson, and later for the 1970s and 1980s James Bond and Superman film series.

== Biography ==
=== Early years ===
Derek Meddings was born 15 January 1931 in St Pancras, London, England. Both Meddings' parents had worked in the British film industry: his father as a carpenter at Denham Studios and his mother as producer Alex Korda's secretary and actress Merle Oberon's stand-in. Meddings went to art school and, in the late 1940s, also found work at Denham Studios, lettering credit titles. It was there that he met effects designer Les Bowie and joined his matte painting department.

During the 1950s, Meddings' work with Bowie included the creation of Transylvanian landscapes for Hammer Films and a "string and cardboard" invention that proved useful when Meddings was hired for Gerry Anderson's earliest TV puppet series.

In 1953, he married Anne S. Dodge (born 1935). In 1972, Meddings married Alexe Anne Inglis (born 18 May 1954).

=== Gerry Anderson productions ===
Meddings' first work with Anderson was as an uncredited art assistant on Anderson's second puppet series, Torchy the Battery Boy, produced in 1957. In 1960, he painted cut-out backgrounds of ranch houses and picket fences for Four Feather Falls. He was credited with the special effects in Anderson's 1960 and 1962 series Supercar and Fireball XL5, being elevated to special effects director for Stingray (1964) for which he and Reg Hill designed the main models. Meddings became special effects supervisor for Thunderbirds (1965–66), during which time he was responsible for the design of the Thunderbird machines themselves. He was visual effects supervisor for all the Anderson puppet series of the late 1960s (Captain Scarlet and the Mysterons, Joe 90 and The Secret Service) and also Anderson's first live-action series, UFO, at the start of the 1970s. He performed the same role on Anderson's three 1960s feature films, Thunderbirds Are Go (1966), Thunderbird 6 (1968) and the live-action Doppelgänger (1969; also known as Journey to the Far Side of the Sun). During his time working on these series, Meddings and his team developed a number of innovations in the filming of miniature models and landscapes which have since become standard in the industry.

=== James Bond films ===
In the 1970s, Meddings furthered his career by working on the special effects for the James Bond films. He first impressed producer Cubby Broccoli with some miniature effects that he had created for Live and Let Die (1973). Once Broccoli realised the economic advantages of building detailed models instead of expensive full-sized constructions, Meddings was encouraged to come up with design concepts for the next film in the series, The Man with the Golden Gun (1974). After this, he was contacted by Pink Floyd, and Meddings handled all the pyrotechnics on the Pink Floyd shows in 1975.

He returned to the James Bond films in 1977 with The Spy Who Loved Me. Among other tasks, Meddings spent four months on location in the Bahamas, where he supervised the construction of a "miniature" supertanker more than 60 ft (18 m) long and three "miniature" nuclear submarines for exterior sequences filmed at sea. He also designed and built the Lotus Esprit car which converted into a submersible, cleverly intercutting full-sized body shells with one-quarter-scale miniatures.

For Moonraker (1979), Meddings created and photographed miniatures of Drax's space shuttles and space station and also realised the final space battle. Due to the film's tight schedule, Meddings was unable to use optical compositing (which is a lengthy process due to the extensive film processing involved) to combine the different elements for the space sequences. Instead, they were combined in-camera using multiple passes of the same piece of film. Film would sometimes be exposed as many as 90 times to capture the dozens of separately photographed elements. The film was nominated for the Academy Award for Visual Effects.

Meddings was Visual Effects Supervisor on For Your Eyes Only (1981). The ship's explosion was done with a miniature at Pinewood Studios in the tank on the 007 Stage.

For GoldenEye (1995), Meddings again created miniatures. This includes a train crash and a jet fighter crash. The climatic destruction of a gigantic satellite dish used a model built by Meddings' team, intercut with scenes shot with stuntmen in Britain.

=== Other work ===
In 1975, Meddings created cost-effective model monsters which could be photographed in the same frame as the actors in the prehistoric adventure film The Land That Time Forgot.

On Superman (1978), his work included building a 60 ft (18 m) miniature of the Golden Gate Bridge to be destroyed in an earthquake, complete with a colliding scale school bus and cars, while Superman (suspended on wires) flew in to the rescue. He also built and photographed the Krypton miniatures in addition to a large-scale model of the Hoover Dam. Due to the film's schedule overruns and Meddings' own commitments to the James Bond series, he was unable to complete the dam flooding sequence and the production hired a California-based company to complete the sequence – resulting in some visibly inferior miniature work in the latter part of the film.

Meddings believed that he was asked to supervise the effects for Batman (1989) because director Tim Burton was a fan of his work on Thunderbirds.

Meddings set up his own visual effects company, The Magic Camera Company, based at Lee International's Shepperton Studios. Lee International acquired the company in 1986. For The NeverEnding Story II: The Next Chapter (1990), he established another company in Germany. He appeared once as an actor, in the role of Dr Stinson in Spies Like Us (1985).

== Death ==
At the time of his death from colorectal cancer in 1995, Meddings was engaged in post-production on the latest James Bond film, GoldenEye, on which his sons Mark and Elliott James (born May 1973) also worked. A dedication in the credits of the completed film reads "To the memory of Derek Meddings".

Meddings is known to have had two other sons: Nicholas Alexander (born July 1980) and Noah Luscombe (born August 1978). He also had at least one daughter: Chloe Loveday (born 1982).

== Awards ==
- In 1979, for his work on Superman (1978), Meddings was awarded a shared Special Achievement Award for special effects by the Academy of Motion Picture Arts and Sciences, and shared the Michael Balcon Award of the British Academy of Film and Television Arts (BAFTA).
- He was also nominated for the 1980 Academy Award for Best Visual Effects for his work on Moonraker (1979), for the 1990 BAFTA Award for Best Special Visual Effects for Batman (1989), and posthumously for a 1996 BAFTA Award for Best Achievement (in special effects) for GoldenEye (1995).

== Filmography ==
=== Visual effects ===
- Fireball XL5 (1962)
- Stingray (1964)
- Thunderbirds (1965)
- Thunderbirds Are Go (1966)
- Captain Scarlet and the Mysterons (1967)
- Thunderbird 6 (1968)
- Joe 90 (1968)
- Doppelgänger (aka Journey to the Far Side of the Sun; 1969)
- The Secret Service (1969)
- UFO (1970)
- Z.P.G. (1972)
- Fear Is the Key (1972)
- Live and Let Die (1973)
- The Man with the Golden Gun (1974)
- The Land That Time Forgot (1975)
- Shout at the Devil (1976)
- Aces High (1976)
- The Spy Who Loved Me (1977)
- Superman: The Movie (1978)
- Moonraker (1979)
- Superman II (1980)
- For Your Eyes Only (1981)
- Krull (1983)
- Banzaï (1983)
- Superman III (1983)
- Supergirl (1984)
- Spies Like Us (1985)
- Santa Claus: The Movie (1985)
- Mio min Mio (1987)
- High Spirits (1988)
- Apprentice to Murder (1988)
- Batman (1989)
- The NeverEnding Story II: The Next Chapter (1991)
- Hudson Hawk (1991)
- Cape Fear (1991)
- The NeverEnding Story III (1994)
- GoldenEye (1995)

=== Actor ===
- Spies Like Us (1985) – Dr. Stinson
