= AP Films =

UK film and television production company

Anderson Provis Films
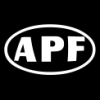
- Logo used by the company until 1966
- Industry: Television production; Film production
- Genre: Science fiction; Fantasy; Adventure
- Predecessors: Polytechnic Films; Pentagon Films
- Founded: 1957 (Maidenhead, UK)
- Founders: Gerry Anderson; Arthur Provis
- Fate: Dissolved c. 1972
- Successors: Group Three Productions; Gerry Anderson Productions
- Headquarters: Islet Park, Maidenhead; (1957–1959); Slough Trading Estate; (1959–1971)
- Key people: Sylvia Anderson; Reg Hill; John Read
- Owner: Lew Grade (from 1962)
- Number of employees: Over 200 (at its peak)
- Parent: Century 21 Organisation (from 1966)
- Subsidiaries: Arrow Productions; AP Films (Merchandising)

AP Films or APF (renamed Century 21 Productions in 1966) was a British independent film production company of the 1950s until the early 1970s. The company became internationally known for its imaginative children's action-adventure marionette television series – most significantly Thunderbirds – produced for British ITV network companies Associated-Rediffusion, Granada, ABC and ATV. At its height, the company employed more than 200 staff.

== Origins ==
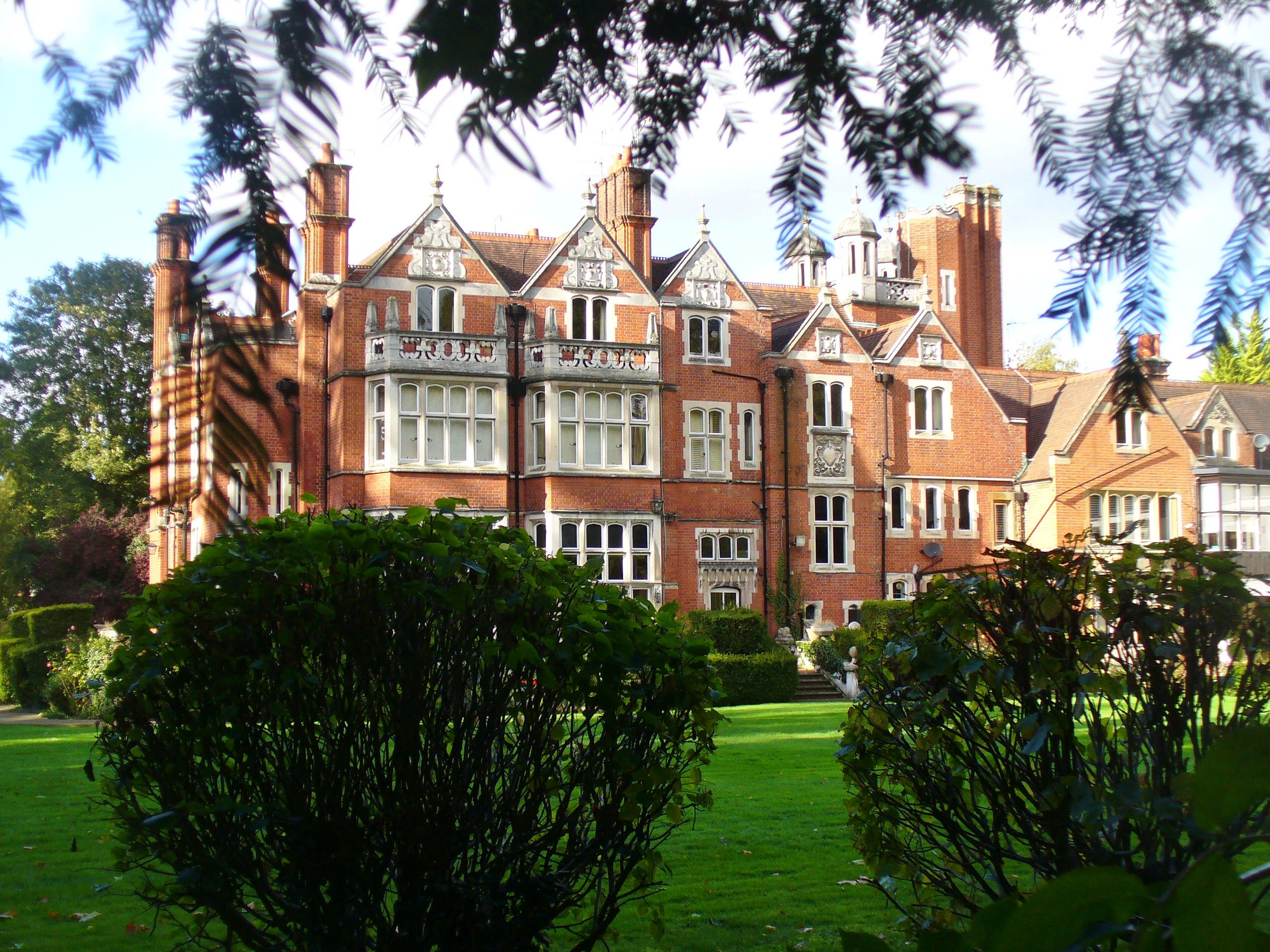
Islet Park House in Maidenhead, APF's production base in the 1950s

Established in 1957 by editor-director Gerry Anderson and cinematographer Arthur Provis, following the liquidation of their employer Polytechnic Films, AP Films was set up, named after the initials of Anderson and Provis. They took with them producer Reg Hill, cinematographer John Read and secretary, then known as Sylvia Thamm. Thamm would later become Anderson's second wife. The company was created with the intention of it becoming a conventional film production house.

With no commissions and funds running low, APF were approached with an offer of collaboration with children's author Roberta Leigh and her colleague Suzanne Warner to produce the puppet TV series The Adventures of Twizzle for Associated-Rediffusion. With some reluctance, the company took on the commission and the programme was such a success that it immediately led to a further collaboration with Leigh for the first series of Torchy the Battery Boy.

In 1959, Provis left the company amicably following disagreements with Anderson over future strategy. APF then went on to make its first wholly independent production of Four Feather Falls, a puppet Western created by Barry Gray who was better known for his musical contributions to the company's productions, for Granada Television. In 1960, APF made a live-action thriller feature film, Crossroads to Crime, for Anglo-Amalgamated, and a series of TV advertisements for a London travel company.

== Success ==
Returning to filming with puppets, but with a change in direction and the adoption of a technique by which mouth movements were synchronised with recorded dialogue in a process that Anderson dubbed "Supermarionation", the company then filmed its best-known productions – a succession of futuristic science-fiction action-adventure series, all made for ATV. Supercar was made between 1960 and 1961, Fireball XL5 in 1962, Stingray in 1964 – the first British children's TV series to be filmed exclusively in colour – and Thunderbirds between 1964 and 1966. Following the completion of Fireball XL5, ATV owner Lew Grade had purchased the company, becoming managing director, with the Andersons, Hill and Read remaining as directors.

== Productions ==
The following were made under the AP Films name.

- The Adventures of Twizzle, 1957–1958 (Associated-Rediffusion)
- Torchy the Battery Boy, 1960 (ABC)
- Four Feather Falls, 1960 (Granada)
- Crossroads to Crime, 1960 (film)
- Supercar, 1961–1962, (ATV)
- Fireball XL5, 1962–1963 (ATV)
- Stingray, 1964–1965 (ATV)
- Thunderbirds (first series), 1965–1966 (ATV)

== Century 21 ==
Century 21 logo

Following completion of the first season of Thunderbirds, AP Films was renamed Century 21 Productions to align it with its growing merchandising sister companies Century 21 Merchandising, Century 21 Toys, Century 21 Music, and Century 21 Publications. In the second half of the 1960s, the company expanded its studios, increasing the number of filming stages to seven.

All Century 21's productions featured an opening ident of a field of pale concentric circles, which form a moving, off-centre tunnel against a blue background, into which flies a yellow dart which penetrates through a gap in the Century 21 logo already situated in front, at which point everything stops moving. This was accompanied by a typical Barry Gray string glissando and the caption "A Gerry Anderson Century 21 Television/Cinema Production" – the logo being part of that. This sequence was first used for the two Thunderbirds films that followed the series (Thunderbirds Are Go – premiering 12 December 1966 – and Thunderbird 6 in 1968), and two more Supermarionation series for ATV, Captain Scarlet and the Mysterons (broadcast between 1967 and 1968) and Joe 90 in (1968–69).

A live-action film, Doppelgänger (a.k.a. Journey to the Far Side of the Sun) followed in 1969. That same year, Century 21 made its final puppet TV series, the rarely seen The Secret Service (which combined live action with puppetry), after which its puppet studios closed and its merchandising and publication subsidiaries contracted rapidly. Its first and only all-live action TV series, UFO (1970), proved to be its last production. Although a second series of UFO was planned, the project failed to progress beyond substantial pre-production work.

== Group Three ==
At the start of the 1970s, on completion of their contracted tenure stemming from Lew Grade's 1962 buy-out, the Andersons and Reg Hill went on to form another company titled Group Three Productions (named after the three founders), with Gerry as chairman. Although no longer owned by Grade, the company maintained a close professional relationship with him. It produced The Protectors and the first series of Space: 1999.

== Other notable people ==
Although most notable for its link with Gerry and Sylvia Anderson, the company features other notable figures in its history. Barry Gray composed and arranged the scores for all Anderson's independent productions up to and including the first series of Space: 1999 in 1975. Second unit director Brian Johnson would go on to become a leading special effects figure in film production in the United States. Christine Glanville, already an experienced puppeteer, joined the expanding company in the early days to supervise puppet operations, progressing into production management toward the end of Century 21's existence.

Derek Meddings joined the staff in the earliest days as a special effects assistant, painting miniatures on scenery, but ultimately became the department's director, developing significant advances in miniature effects technology. Prior to his death in 1995, he would later rise to the position of one of the foremost special effects experts in the film industry, working on major films including the Bond movies.
