= Ronnie Stevens (actor) =

British actor (1925–2006)

- Born: Ronald George Stevens; 2 September 1925; Peckham, London, England
- Died: 11 November 2006 (aged 81); Northwood, London, England
- Occupation: Actor
- Years active: 1948–1998
- Spouse: Ann Bristow (m. 1959; died 2006)
- Children: 2
- Military career
- Allegiance: (United Kingdom) Great Britain
- Branch: British Army, Royal Air Force
- Conflicts: World War II

Ronald George Stevens (2 September 1925 – 11 November 2006) was an English actor.

== Biography ==
=== Early life ===
Stevens was born in Peckham, south London, England, the son of Fanny Elizabeth (Carpenter) and Henry Edward Stevens. He served in World War II in both the Royal Air Force (RAF) and the Royal Engineers of the British Army.

=== Acting career ===
Stevens was a versatile actor, who started his performance career in theatrical revue in 1948, he appeared on television in numerous comedies like May to September, Goodnight Sweetheart and A.J. Wentworth, B.A. although he was equally at home in drama roles including TheAvengers and Rumpole of the Bailey.

He also appeared as the "Minister of Pollution", in The Goodies pollution episode. He played minor roles in many other sitcoms including Wild, Wild Women, Winning Widows, Only When I Laugh, Ever Decreasing Circles, Hi-de-Hi!, Yes, Prime Minister, Terry and June, Chance in a Million and As Time Goes By. He played roles in Dick and the Duchess, Hetty Wainthropp Investigates, and as Sir Andrew Aguecheek in the 1980 BBC Television Shakespeare series presentation of Twelfth Night. He appeared as Mr Rudge in the Tales of the Unexpected (TV series) episode (9/5) "The Facts of Life" (1988).

In 1965–66 Stevens co-starred in the pioneering Australian TV satirical comedy series The Mavis Bramston Show, where he replaced founding cast member Gordon Chater.

Stevens also appeared in the 1962 film Carry On Cruising, the 1996 film Brassed Off, and the 1998 film The Parent Trap.

He co-narrated Noggin the Nog with Oliver Postgate.

Stevens also lent his voice to the classic children's puppet series Space Patrol and Sara and Hoppity and the children's animated series Captain Zed and the Zee Zone along with various British and Canadian voice actors as well as providing voices for the animated film Rarg.

=== Personal life ===
His wife, Ann, predeceased him by six months. His older son died from Cystic Fibrosis in 1990. He is survived by his younger son and one grandson. Stevens was 81 at the time of his death on 11 November 2006 at Denville Hall in Northwood, London, England.

== Filmography (selected) ==
Year	Title	Role	Notes
1949	Under Capricorn	Officer at Ball	Uncredited
1952	Top Secret	Aubrey	
1952	Made in Heaven	TV Announcer	Uncredited
1953	Love in Pawn	Grocer	
1954	The Scarlet Web	Simpson	
1954	The Embezzler	Travel Agent	Uncredited
1954	For Better, for Worse	Fishmonger's Assistant	
1955	As Long as They're Happy	Box intruder	
1955	The Hornet's Nest	Bill, the Photographer	
1955	Value for Money	Compere	
1955	No Smoking	BBC Man	
1955	An Alligator Named Daisy	Singer	Uncredited
1956	The Narrowing Circle	Jimmy	
1956	The Extra Day	Reporter	Uncredited
1957	Doctor at Large	Waiter at hotel	
1958	I Was Monty's Double	M.I.5. Tail	
1958	Bachelor of Hearts	Shop Assistant	
1959	Danger Within	Lt. Meynell, 'The Sewer Rat'	
1959	I'm All Right Jack	Hooper	
1960	Doctor in Love	Harold Green	
1960	Dentist in the Chair	Brian Dexter	
1961	Very Important Person	Hankley	
1961	Nearly a Nasty Accident	Flight Lt. Pocock	
1961	Dentist on the Job	Brian Dexter	
1962	It's Trad, Dad!	TV Director	
1962	A Pair of Briefs	Hotel Under-Manager	
1962	Carry On Cruising	Drunk Passenger	
1962	On the Beat	Oberon	
1963	Doctor in Distress	Hotel Manager	
1965	A Home of Your Own	The Architect	
1965	Those Magnificent Men in Their Flying Machines	Reporter	Uncredited
1965	San Ferry Ann	Hiker Boy	
1965	Give a Dog a Bone	Ringo	
1966	Doctor in Clover	TV Producer	
1966	The Sandwich Man	Drunk	
1967	Smashing Time	1st Waiter	
1969	Some Girls Do	Peregrine Carruthers	
1969	Goodbye, Mr. Chips	Algie	
1974	All I Want Is You... and You... and You...	Husband	
1979	S.O.S. Titanic	Doctor McGee - Carpathia	uncredited
1984	Captain Stirrick	William Perfect	
1985	Morons from Outer Space	Hotel Manager	
1988	Rarg	Baby, Senator	(voice)
1989	Countdown to War	Phipps	
1990	Secret Weapon	Barber	
1992	Blame It on the Bellboy	Man on Plane	
1996	Brassed Off	Albert Hall Judge	
1998	The Parent Trap	Charles James (Annie and Hallie's Maternal Grandfather and Liz's father)	Final film role
