= Barry Gray =

English musician (1908–1984)

Background information
- Born: John Livesey Eccles; 18 July 1908; Blackburn, Lancashire, England
- Origin: London
- Died: 26 April 1984 (aged 75) Guernsey, Channel Islands
- Genres: Military, electronic
- Occupations: Composer, arranger and conductor
- Instruments: Electronic piano, hammond organ, ondes Martenot
- Years active: 1930s–1980s
- Website: www.barrygray.co.uk

Barry Gray (born John Livesey Eccles; 18 July 1908 – 26 April 1984) was an English musician and composer best known for his collaborations with television and film producer Gerry Anderson.

== Life and career ==
Born into a musical family in Blackburn, Lancashire, Gray was encouraged to pursue a musical career from an early age. Starting at the age of five – with piano lessons – he studied diligently and became a student at the Manchester Royal College of Music and at Blackburn Cathedral. He studied composition under the Hungarian born émigré composer Matyas Seiber. Gray's first professional job was for B. Feldman & Co. in London, where he gained experience in scoring for theatre and variety orchestras. From there, he joined Radio Normandy as a composer-arranger. After serving for six years with the Royal Air Force during World War II he returned to the music industry to work with such names as Vera Lynn and Hoagy Carmichael.

In 1956 Gray joined Gerry Anderson's AP Films and scored its first marionette puppet television series, The Adventures of Twizzle. This was followed by Torchy The Battery Boy and Four Feather Falls, a puppet Western based on a concept suggested by Gray. His association with Anderson lasted throughout the 1960s. Although best known for his score to Thunderbirds (in particular the "March of the Thunderbirds" title music), Gray's work also included the themes to all the other "Supermarionation" productions, including Fireball XL5, Stingray, Captain Scarlet and the Mysterons, Joe 90 and The Secret Service. Recording sessions were held at Olympic Studios, Pye Studios and CTS Studios in London, Anvil Studios in Denham, Buckinghamshire and Gray's own studios at his residence in Esher, Surrey.

Additionally, Gray is known as the composer for the Anderson live-action series of the 1970s, such as UFO and Space: 1999 (though he was not involved in scoring The Protectors). His work in cinema included the scores to the Thunderbirds feature films Thunderbirds Are Go (1966) and Thunderbird 6 (1968), and the live-action science-fiction drama Doppelgänger (1969). Gray's professional association with Anderson and his career in TV and film scoring ended when he decided to leave the production of Space: 1999 after the completion of the first series. His replacement for the second series was Derek Wadsworth, who composed new title music.

In 1970, Gray moved from Esher to St Peter Port, Guernsey. Later, after his retirement, he served as resident pianist at the Old Government House Hotel. Gray died of heart disease in hospital on Guernsey on 26 April 1984. Prior to his death, Gerry Anderson hoped that Gray would return to do the musical score for Terrahawks. He had a son, Simon.

== Composing style ==
Gray's music is characterised by the use of brass and percussion sections. It made extensive use of leitmotifs, with each machine in Thunderbirds having its own theme and the eponymous title character of Joe 90 being accompanied on-screen by a wordless representation of his name. The ensembles required for Gray's scoring in series such as Thunderbirds and Stingray dwarfed those used in the production of most contemporary television programmes; even the orchestra employed for the first Anderson-produced series to carry the "Supermarionation" label, Supercar, comprised some forty instrumentalists. A standout example is Stingray: March of the Oysters (1964), which was later recorded by the City of Prague Philharmonic Orchestra, conducted by Nic Raine.

Besides composing and conducting orchestral scores for television and film, Gray developed an interest in the ondes Martenot, which he used to produce unconventional musical notes as well as electronic sound effects in several of his scores, including those for Captain Scarlet and the Mysterons and Doppelgänger (1969). Gray's knowledge and recognition in the field resulted in commissions to provide electronic music and sound effects for such films as Dr. Who and the Daleks (1965), Island of Terror (1966), and Daleks' Invasion Earth 2150 A.D. (1966), and uncredited work on Fahrenheit 451 (1966).

Gray believed that the score for the live action Doppelgänger was his best. It was recorded in three studio sessions between 27 and 29 March 1969. The first of these sessions used a 55-member orchestra, the second 44 and the third 28. The scenes of Ross and Kane's journey to the Counter-Earth are accompanied by a piece titled "Sleeping Astronauts" featuring the Ondes Martenot, played by French ondiste Sylvette Allart. Archer and Hearn describe this piece as "one of the most enchanting" ever written by Gray, adding that the soundtrack as a whole evokes a "traditional Hollywood feel" in contrast with the film's future setting.

Fanderson, the official appreciation society dedicated to the productions of Gerry Anderson, has gained access to all Gray's original studio tapes and undertaken a major re-issue project, compiling the theme and incidental music from Gray's various collaborations with Anderson onto a series of re-mastered CDs. Silva Screen Records has released several single-disc versions of the tv series soundtracks (Supercar, Fireball XL5, Thunderbirds) and feature film Thunderbirds are Go. Unlike the Fanderson releases (members-only) the Silva Screen discs are available to the general public.

== Centenary concert ==
On the evening of 8 November 2008, to mark the centenary year of Gray's birth, a concert was held in the Royal Festival Hall at London's South Bank Centre. Ralph Titterton, restorer of the Gray archive and co-producer of the original soundtrack CDs, and Cathy Ford, a librarian, researcher and biographer, joined film composer, conductor and arranger François Evans to produce the event in aid of the Cinema and Television Benevolent Fund.

== Discography ==
- Space Age Nursery Rhymes (Mini-EP, Century 21. Comical updates of nursery rhymes sung by Ken Barrie and Eula Parker; "Three Refined Mice" sung by Gray.)
- Great Themes from Thunderbirds (Mini-EP, Century 21. Record with incidental music.)
- Themes from Captain Scarlet (Mini-EP, Century 21. Record with songs and instrumentals from the series and some cover versions of other series.)
- No Strings Attached (Maxi-single. A release of all the commercial recordings of theme music, near-originals. The CD release also includes "March of the Oysters" from the Stingray episode "Secret of the Giant Oyster".)
- Thunderbirds Are Go! (LP, United Artists. Film soundtrack incorporating pieces from the TV series; not the original film recording. The EMI CD release also includes the tracks sung by The Shadows.)
- Thunderbirds (CD, Silva Screen. TV soundtrack, released posthumously.)
- Captain Scarlet (CD, Silva Screen. TV soundtrack, released posthumously.)
- Joe 90 (CD, Silva Screen. TV soundtrack, released posthumously.)
- Stand By For Adverts (CD, Trunk Records. A compilation of Gray's TV advertising jingles and incidental music recorded in the late 1950s and 1960s. Released in 2011.)
- The Cult Files Re-Opened. Silva Screen 2 CDs (1997). Cult TV and film themes.
- Supercar/Fireball XL5 (CD, Fanderson. Original incidental music from the series, released posthumously in 1998)
- Space: 1999 year 1 (CD, Fanderson. Original incidental music from the series, released posthumously in 1998)
- Space: 1999 40th Anniversary Edition (3CD, Fanderson. Original incidental music from the series, released posthumously in 2014)
- Space: 1999 year 1 (CD, Silva Screen, SILCD1642, 2021)
- UFO (CD, Fanderson. Original incidental music from the series, released posthumously in 2003)
- Thunderbird 6 (CD, MGM. Film soundtrack, released posthumously in 2005)
- The Secret Service (CD, Fanderson. Original incidental music from the series, released posthumously in 2007)
- Stingray (CD, Fanderson. Original incidental music from the series, released posthumously in 2009)
- UFO (CD, Fanderson. Original incidental music from the series, re-released posthumously in 2010)
- Four Feather Falls (CD, Fanderson. Original incidental music from the series, released posthumously in 2011)
- Fireball XL5 (CD, Fanderson. Original incidental music from the series, re-released posthumously in 2012)
- Supercar (CD, Fanderson. Original incidental music from the series, re-released posthumously in 2013)
- Space: 1999 year 1 (CD, Fanderson. Original incidental music from the series, re-released posthumously in 2014)
- Thunderbirds Are Go/Thunderbird 6 (CD, La-La Land records. Films soundtrack, released posthumously in 2014)
- Thunderbirds (CD, Fanderson. Original incidental music from the series, released posthumously in 2015)
- Captain Scarlet (CD, Fanderson. Original incidental music from the series, released posthumously in 2015)
- Joe 90 (CD, Fanderson. Original incidental music from the series, released posthumously in 2017)
- Doppelgänger (CD, Fanderson, Film soundtrack, released posthumously in 2018)
- Stingray (CD, Fanderson. Original incidental music from the series, re-released posthumously in 2019)
- UFO (CD, Fanderson. Original incidental music from the series, re-released posthumously in 2020)
- Crossroads to Crime (CD "The Golden Age of Crime Dramas Vol 1" Dragon Domains Records DDR 700, 2026)

== See also ==
- List of film director and composer collaborations
