= Sara and Hoppity =

British children's TV series (1962–1963)

- Created by: Roberta Leigh
- Written by: Roberta Leigh
- Directed by: Arthur Provis; Bill Palmer (art)
- Voices of: Ysanne Churchman; Ronnie Stevens; Dera Cooper
- Composer: Ronald Hanmer
- Country of origin: United Kingdom
- Original language: English
- No. of episodes: 52 (51 missing)

Production
- Producer: Roberta Leigh
- Running time: 13 mins (approx)
- Production company: P. P. Productions for Associated-Rediffusion

Original release
- Network: ITV
- Release: 27 February 1962 – 26 February 1963

Sara and Hoppity is a British children's puppet television series, created and produced by Roberta Leigh, which aired from 1962 to 1963. It was based on a series of four books written by Leigh and illustrated by Marion Wilson. Most of this series no longer exists in the archives, but the first episode and episode 47 are known to exist.

== Overview ==
Sara Brown lives with her parents, above their "Toy Hospital" shop. In the first episode an old man brings in a broken toy, which he has found in a goblin ring, to sell. The toy, called "Hoppity", can sing and dance, but it is a "falling over dance" as the toy only has one leg. Her parents want nothing to do with the toy, but Miss Julie who lives up in the attic and makes clothes for all the toys, gives Sara the money to buy Hoppity.

The man accepts six pence. Sara washes the dirty toy and her father finds it a new leg, but one a little bit shorter than the other. Miss Julie gives her clothes for him, and her mother gives Hoppity two shiny glass beads for eyes. Her mother cuts off a little of Sara's hair and puts it on the bald doll's head. Miss Julie also gives Sara an apron with a pocket big enough for Hoppity.

When wound up, the toy dances and sings an annoying "Diddly dum, diddly dee" song, which Sara somehow understands. Being very naughty, Hoppity's ideas often lead Sara into trouble. For example, in episode 32 (and by extension, the first book and the pilot film), she cuts all the flowers from an expensive hat, belonging to her step aunt Matilda, to put in a vase on the dining table.

== Production ==
The series ran from 27 February 1962 until 26 February 1963, with 52 episodes of about thirteen minutes. A pilot film was produced in 1960.

The show was produced by Roberta Leigh and directed by Arthur Provis. The art director was Bill Palmer, and the editor was Peter Saunders. The puppets were made by Jack Whitehead and operated by Jane Tyson, Jane Phillips and Michael Whitehead. Roberta Leigh wrote the screenplay, music and lyrics. The music was arranged by Ronald Hanmer and the show was made by P. P. Productions of Teddington for Roberta Leigh. Unlike some similar puppet shows of the time, the puppet strings were all but invisible.
