= Torchy the Battery Boy =

British children's TV series (1959–1961)

- Genre: Children's; Fantasy; Adventure
- Written by: Roberta Leigh
- Directed by: Gerry Anderson (Series 1); Vivian Milroy (Series 2)
- Voices of: Kenneth Connor; Olwyn Griffiths; Jill Raymond; Patricia Somerset
- Music by: Roberta Leigh, arranged by Barry Gray
- Country of origin: United Kingdom
- Original language: English
- No. of series: 2
- No. of episodes: 52

Production
- Producer: Roberta Leigh (S1)
- Cinematography: Arthur Provis (S1)
- Running time: 13 minutes
- Production companies: Pelham Films (S1); AP Films (S1); Associated British-Pathé (S2)
- Budget: £27,000 (S1)

Original release
- Network: ITV
- Release: 11 January 1959 (ABC Weekend TV)

Torchy the Battery Boy is a British children's puppet television series, the second to be produced by AP Films (APF), which first aired on the ITV network between 1959 and 1961. Created and written by author Roberta Leigh, it had music by Barry Gray, art direction by Reg Hill and special effects by Derek Meddings. Featuring string puppets created by Christine Glanville, the series depicts the adventures of the eponymous boy doll, who has a battery inside him and a lamp in his head, and his master Mr Bumbledrop (voiced by Kenneth Connor).

Two series of Torchy, each comprising twenty-six 13-minute episodes, were made. The first was produced by APF, on a budget of £27,000 (about £550,000 in 2025), between October 1958 and April 1959. After APF declined to make a second series (opting to create Four Feather Falls instead), Leigh, who retained the rights to Torchy and its creative elements, commissioned Associated British-Pathé to produce a further 26 episodes.

The first series premiered on ABC Weekend TV on 11 January 1959, followed by Associated-Rediffusion on 23 February 1960. The second series premiered on Associated-Rediffusion on 23 August 1960. The show is one of several children's television programmes from the mid-20th century to exist today in its entirety, without loss or damage. Both series have been digitally remastered and released on DVD.

== Plot ==
Torchy, the Battery Boy, was created by Mr Bumbledrop, a lonely old toymaker who spends the majority of his days tending to his garden, where the neighbourhood children play. Torchy has a lamp on his head, and when he pushes a button on his jacket and utters a mysterious phrase, the light illuminates and gives Torchy magical insights. Mr Bumbledrop also builds a cardboard rocket ship, which allows the boy to soar through the heavens.

The brightest star in the night sky is Topsy Turvy Land, home of all of the abused and neglected toys that once belonged to naughty children. There, the toys spring to life and animals have the ability to speak. Everyone is at home in this mysterious world, with its lollipop fields, cream bun trees, and chocolate puddles. However, Torchy frequently goes to earth to visit Mr Bumbledrop, get replacement batteries, and return with naughty children who need to learn a lesson. In Topsy Turvy Land, humans shrink to the size of toys, and various children are subjected to the same horrors that they unleashed upon their playthings.

== Characters ==
Numerous discrepancies in the spelling of names exist throughout the various Torchy materials.

=== Earthlings ===
- Mr Bumble-Drop: A kind elderly man who lets the neighbourhood children play in his garden. He is the creator of Torchy and the owner of Pom-Pom.
- Bossy Boots: A bratty girl who acts as if she's the centre of the universe, demanding that everyone around her should do as she commands. She is plump and wears her hair in pigtails. Former owner of Flopsy the ragdoll and Clinker the money box.
- Mrs Meanymouth: Mother of Bogey, Mrs Meanymouth is an undesirable woman who's not above stealing.
- Bogey Meanymouth: An obnoxious boy who openly backtalks to his mother, Bogey is the former owner of Pongo the Pirate.
- Bobby and Babs: A pair of twins who were once well-behaved, but have decided that it's much more fun to be naughty.

=== Topsy Turvians ===
- Torchy: A battery-powered boy who has a magical flashlight on his hat. Torchy is good-natured, tries to help anyone in need, and he frequently finds ways to punish naughty children.
- Clinker: A money-box formerly owned by Bossy Boots, who refused to save money, thus starving him. In Topsy Turvy Land, he finds a money tree that keeps him well fed.
- Daffy: A donkey who pulls King Dithers' coach. She has a remarkable memory, although she's consistently glum, bearing more than a bit of similarity to Eeyore from the Winnie the Pooh series. She used to belong to a boy named Geoffrey.
- Ena: A hyena who'll laugh at anything, which endears her to Pilliwig the clown. She loves to knit, but the garments that she makes are too big for anyone to wear.
- Flopsy: Bossy Boots' former rag doll, who was constantly abused by the girl. She hasn't got enough stuffing inside her because it has been pulled out, and the lack of substance in her head has made her a bit dim. Frequently forgetting words, she substitutes the phrase "Piggle-poggle."
- King Dithers: The bumbling King of Topsy Turvy Land. It's repeatedly stated that he lives in an orange-peel palace, but his home resembles a run-of-the-mill castle.
- Gillygolly: The tallest Gullywug in the world.
- Man in the Moon: The sole inhabitant of the moon, who has grown weary of his nightly responsibilities illuminating the world. Although he's not a resident of Topsy Turvy Land, he appeared to be in a pair of series two episodes (since the puppet makers had moved on to another project).
- Pilliwig: A clown who lives to entertain everyone whom he encounters.
- Pollikan: A strange bird who vaguely resembles a pelican, Pollikan loves hiding shiny objects in his mouth, so King Dithers has entrusted the fowl with guarding his crown and jewels.
- Pom-Pom: Mr Bumbledrop's pet poodle. Pom-Pom's fur grows straight, so the vain pooch has to put curlers in it each night. Her favourite meal is meatballs in chocolate sauce, and since Mr Bumbledrop would not allow her to eat chocolate, she decides to stay in Topsy Turvy Land, where she can lap up the chocolate puddles.
- Pongo the Pirate: A toy formerly owned by Bogey Meanymouth, who continuously made him walk the plank and crash into the water. In Topsy Turvy Land, he fashions a boat from a grapefruit husk and is always looking for mischief.
- Sparky: A young fire-breathing dragon who initially terrifies the Topsy Turvy residents. The only one of her kind in the vicinity, Sparky was incredibly lonely before Torchy discovered she was friendly. The dragon survives on a diet of spicy dishes such as peppers, which aid her fire-breathing abilities.
- Squish: An American space boy toy who crash-landed and became stranded in Topsy Turvy Land. Although he's not as naughty as the other children of Earth, he sometimes does selfish, reckless things.
- Ting-a-Ling: A chiming bird who does his best to help everyone whom he encounters. He is overtly feminine but referred to as male.
- Whirly: A humming spinning top who was once rusty, until Torchy taught him that peanut oil is a lubricant.

== Episodes ==
The show premiered in the Midlands in 1959, but it did not premiere in London until 1960, where it aired consecutively for 52 weeks as one series. Writer Roberta Leigh obviously wrote several shows for the second series to bridge gaps in the first season's stories (denoted below). Presumably, these were aired on London television in the proper chronological story sequence, but on DVD, the shows were presented in production order as two separate series. TV listings of the era were primitive and online listings feature conflicting airdates, so the tables below list the two series without airdates, just as they appeared on DVD, in an effort to avoid inaccuracies.

=== Series One ===
No. overall	No. in series	Title	Directed by	Written by
1	1	"Pom-Pom and the Toys"	Gerry Anderson	Roberta Leigh
The naughty children playing in Mr Bumble-Drop's garden tie their toys to the kite strings. Suddenly, a strong wind comes along and blows all of the toys away, as well as Mr Bumble-Drop's poodle, Pom-Pom, who tries to save them. The children blame Bumbledrop and vow never to return, so the lonely old man decides to make a mechanical boy to keep himself company. Four hours later, Torchy springs to life and uses the magic beam on his hat to locate the lost toys on a twinkling star. The next morning, Mr Bumble-Drop builds a rocket of cardboard, and Torchy flies off to retrieve the lost puppy and toys.: Song: "Torchy, the Battery Boy"
2	2	"Topsy Turvy Land"	Gerry Anderson	Roberta Leigh
Torchy's rocket arrives in Topsy Turvy Land, and he tries to convince Pom-Pom and the toys to return to earth, but they decline. Flopsy, the ragdoll, complains about her lack of stuffing, so Torchy convinces Pom-Pom to donate some of her fur.: Song: "In Topsy Turvy Land" (Flopsy)
3	3	"Torchy and Squish"	Gerry Anderson	Roberta Leigh
Torchy meets Squish, an American boy with a water-pistol raygun, who crashed his ship and became stranded in Topsy Turvy Land. Torchy agrees to return the boy to earth, instructing him to wait by the rocket while he consults with his friends. Unfortunately, Squish cannot resist going for a joyride, and he breaks the spacecraft. Torchy uses his magic beam to converse with Mr Bumbledrop, who instructs him to find cardboard to repair the ship. Meanwhile, Pom-Pom resents Flopsy for taking her fur, and she insists that the doll returns it.: Song: "I'm Pom-Pom the Poodle"
4	4	"The Building of Frutown"	Gerry Anderson	Roberta Leigh
Stranded in Topsy Turvy Land, Torchy realises that everyone needs a place to sleep. There are no bricks to be found, but he discovers an orchard filled with oversized fruit, so the toys hollow out pieces to construct homes for themselves.: Song: "Frutown" (Flopsy)
5	5	"Torchy and the Broken Rocket"	Gerry Anderson	Roberta Leigh
Torchy and Squish go in search of cardboard to repair the rocket, and they discover the Ting-a-Ling bird, who suggests that they dig at the base of a pepper tree. Although the bird's hunch was wrong, Pom-Pom is overjoyed to find a puddle of chocolate.: Song: "In My Little Rocket" (Torchy)
6	6	"King Dithers"	Gerry Anderson	Roberta Leigh
Torchy stumbles upon the King of Topsy Turvy Land, who offers the lad a tube of cardboard to repair his rocket. Unfortunately, King Dithers gets rolled up in the tube, and Torchy has to figure out a way to get him out.: Song: "King Dithers, the Dithery King"
7	7	"Torchy Returns to Earth"	Gerry Anderson	Roberta Leigh
Torchy repairs the rocket and plans a return to earth, but no one wants to go with him. However, when his battery dies, Pom-Pom steps up and flies him home to Mr Bumbledrop.: Song: "I'm Pom-Pom the Poodle"
8	8	"Bossy Boots Goes to Topsy Turvy Land"	Gerry Anderson	Roberta Leigh
When Bossy Boots discovers Pom-Pom has returned home to Mr Bumbledrop, she insists that he returns her ragdoll, Flopsy. Torchy offers to take her to Topsy Turvy Land to retrieve the doll, but she refuses, so Mr Bumbledrop decides to use reverse psychology to get her into the rocket. Once she arrives in the strange land, she is horrified to discover she is shrunk to the same size as Flopsy, who begins exacting her revenge.: Song: "The Naughty Children Song" (Torchy)
9	9	"Bossy Boots Is Taught a Lesson"	Gerry Anderson	Roberta Leigh
Flopsy exposes Bossy Boots to the various indignities she suffered at the girl's hand: she pushes her down, shoves food in her face, strips off her clothes, and locks her outside. While wandering around in her underwear, Bossy Boots falls into a hole that King Dithers had dug. The king takes pity on the girl, who vows to change her wicked ways.: Song: "Frutown" (Flopsy); Note: The series two episode "Torchy Gets a Surprise" bridges the story between this episode and the next.
10	10	"A Bell for a Penny-Farthing"	Gerry Anderson	Roberta Leigh
Torchy decides to ride his bicycle instead of playing with Squish or taking out Pom-Pom's curlers. Soon, he accidentally crashes into Pilliwig the clown, who insists that he cannot ride his bike again until he gets a bell. While searching for a ringer, he stumbles upon Whirly, the humming top. Whirly laments the fact that his innards are rusty, and he can no longer hum, so Torchy suggests that he eats peanuts so that the oil will lubricate his gears. While visiting the peanut tree, Ting-a-Ling offers to ride along with Torchy and serve as his bicycle bell.: Song: "I've Got a Penny-Farthing" (Torchy); Note: The second series episode "Banana Bridge" forms a bridge between this episode and the next.
11	11	"A Trick on Pom-Pom"	Gerry Anderson	Roberta Leigh
Now that her fur has regrown and is curled, Pom-Pom has become extraordinarily vain and decides to prance around showing off. Torchy convinces his friends to teach her a lesson by tying a dirty sock in her fur and slathering her with dirt.: Song: "Flopsy"; Note: The second series episode "King Dithers and Daffy" bridges the story between this episode and the next.
12	12	"Torchy Is Stolen"	Gerry Anderson	Roberta Leigh
In need of a new battery, Torchy returns home with Pom-Pom in tow. After Mr Bumbledrop and the pooch head off to the store, Torchy decides to follow, but his battery wears down, and he collapses on the road. Moments later, Mrs Meaniemouth finds Torchy and decides to bring him home as a present for Bogie, despite Mr Bumbledrop's pleas from a distance. After the Meaniemouths head off to buy a new battery for their stolen toy, Mr Bumbledrop and Pom-Pom sneak into their house to retrieve him.: Song: "In My Little Rocket" (Torchy)
13	13	"King Dithers Loses His Crown"	Gerry Anderson	Roberta Leigh
King Dithers decides to brush his hair before his trip to Frutown, and he accidentally leaves his crown behind. After Daffy the Donkey pulls him into town, the king invites Torchy and Squish back to the palace for tea, but they soon discover the crown is not where he left it. Using his magic light, Torchy finds Polliken, an odd bird who seems only to be capable of making odd noises. They eventually learn the reason: Polliken is hiding the king's crown inside his beak. The bird explains that he loves shiny objects and likes to hold them in his mouth, so the king invites him back to the castle to guard his crown and jewels.: Song: "I'm Pollikan"
14	14	"Pilliwig Gets a Present"	Gerry Anderson	Roberta Leigh
The resident toys are no longer amused with Pilliwig's jokes, which depresses the clown. Torchy and Flopsy decide to picnic on an island, where they discover Ena the hyena. They bring her back to Frutown, where Pilliwig is delighted to meet someone who will always laugh at his antics.: Song: "Flopsy"
15	15	"Bad Boy Bogey"	Gerry Anderson	Roberta Leigh
Torchy encounters Bogey drowning his pirate toy, Pongo, in the pond, so he decides to bring him back to Topsy Turvy Land. Once there, Daffy decides to give the boy his comeuppance by submerging him in the water. Meanwhile, Pongo discovers he likes this strange new world and has no intention of ever leaving.: Song: "The Naughty Children Song" (Torchy); Note: The second series episode "Bogey Learns Another Lesson" bridges the story between this episode and the next.
16	16	"Torchy and the Strange Animal"	Gerry Anderson	Roberta Leigh
Torchy, Flopsy, and Pom-Pom decide to visit the toys who dwell in the mountain's caves. They discover the caves abandoned and find Gillygully and Whirly outside, claiming that a monstrous creature has moved into their turf. Torchy and Pom-Pom elect to investigate and discover Sparky, a lonely dragon who's been desperately searching for friends.
17	17	"Bossy Boots Forgets to Be Good"	Gerry Anderson	Roberta Leigh
Torchy learns that Bossy Boots has reverted to her horrid old self, and she has been refusing to feed her coins to Clinker, her money box. Torchy lures the back to Topsy Turvy Land, with the promise of a party in her honour, but instead, he forces her to feed the starving bank.: Song: "In My Little Rocket" (Torchy) & "Clinker the Money Box"
18	18	"The Hungry Money Box"	Gerry Anderson	Roberta Leigh
Clinker is overjoyed to discover an enormous pile of coins that no one requires in Topsy Turvy Land, but Pongo the pirate decides to claim them for his own. Torchy uses his magic lamp to find a gold mine, which turns out to be empty. Fortunately for Clinker, on the grounds above, a money tree has bloomed.: Song: "I'm Pongo the Pirate" & "Clinker the Money Box"
19	19	"The Naughty Twins"	Gerry Anderson	Roberta Leigh
Torchy returns to earth to find Mr Bumbledrop asleep. Not wishing to wake his friend, he sets the table and putters around the house doing nice things. Unfortunately, his battery wears out and he collapses in the garden, where he is found by twins Bobby and Babs. The dastardly duo decide to take him home and imprison him in a chicken run, but Mr Bumbledrop figures out what has happened and comes to his rescue. The old man and toy-boy decide to go to Topsy Turvy Land and lure the twins into the rocket with a bag of toffee, but Mr Bumbledrop is slow to react and gets left behind.: Note: Bobby and Babs were the first prototypes for Supermarionation.
20	20	"The Twins Learn a Lesson"	Gerry Anderson	Roberta Leigh
Torchy entrusts King Dithers to lock the twins in his dungeon, but the loony king is the one who gets locked away. Fortunately, Polliken becomes wise to the situation and puts the bad siblings in their place.: Song: "I'm Pollikan"; Note: The second series episode "The Big Storm" bridges the story between this episode and the next.
21	21	"King Dithers Goes Down to Earth"	Gerry Anderson	Roberta Leigh
Torchy gets caught in a hurricane that blows him back to earth. Unable to return without his rocket, he asks the toys to send Pom-Pom to retrieve him, but the lass has made herself sick eating chocolate. King Dithers volunteers to fly the rocket, and Polliken accompanies him, but the kooky king steers them onto the moon. They discover the Man in the Moon has grown weary of his duties and decides to sleep through the night instead of illuminating the sky.: Song: "In Topsy Turvy Land" (Flopsy)
22	22	"Torchy Is Saved at Last"	Gerry Anderson	Roberta Leigh
Torchy uses his magic light to find King Dithers and Polliken. They fit the Man in the Moon a pair of sunglasses so he can sleep through the day, and prepare to head to earth. Mr Bumbledrop tells Torchy that Bossy Boots has become a good girl, so the toy-boy decides to reward her with a party in Topsy Turvy Land. However, the girl has remained in bed for a week, pretending to be sick to evade her schoolwork. When Torchy learns of this, he reprimands the wretch and leaves her behind as he and Mr Bumbledrop head for the stars.: Note: The second series episodes "King Bumble-Drop" and "Pilliwig Gets a New Suit" bridge the story between this episode and the next.
23	23	"Torchy and the Man on the Moon"	Gerry Anderson	Roberta Leigh
The toys have tired of the native food in Topsy Turvy Land, so Torchy decides to stop at the moon and grab some cheese as he returns Mr Bumbledrop home. Torchy becomes too enamored by the vat of cheese that the Man on the Moon has been making, and he falls in and drowns.: Song: "Clinker the Money Box"
24	24	"Bogey and the Statues"	Gerry Anderson	Roberta Leigh
After returning Torchy to working order, Mr Bumbledrop falls ill, so the boy heads to Mrs Meaniemouth's to retrieve some cough syrup. There, Torchy is captured by Bogey, who ties him up, drags him to the park, and forces him to watch as he destroys the statues. Torchy finally gets free and poses as a statue to mess with Bogey. He returns home with the medicine, which Mr Bumbledrop says he no longer wants, so Torchy has to trick him into drinking it.: Song: "The Naughty Children Song" (Torchy)
25	25	"The Moon Falls Asleep"	Gerry Anderson	Roberta Leigh
Sunset falls as the toys return home from the beach, and they soon find themselves enveloped in pure blackness. Torchy and Flopsy head off in the rocket and discover the Man on the Moon has overslept. After waking him, the toys find themselves stuck in the cream cheese pond, but the moon man is able to rescue them before any damage occurs.: Song: "Flopsy"
26	26	"Torchy's Birthday"	Gerry Anderson	Roberta Leigh
Torchy feels isolated as all of the toys secretively makes plans for his birthday. Whirly overhears his wish for a little brother, so Pom-Pom visits Mr Bumbledrop and makes him build one.: Note: Although Torchy's unnamed brother announces that he will live in Topsy Turvy Land and play with him forever, the character is never referenced again. Coming so late in the show's run, it is probable that this was saved as the series finale in both the Highlands and London.

=== Series Two ===
No. overall	No. in series	Title	Directed by	Written by
27	1	"Flopsy Goes on a Picnic"	Vivian Milroy	Roberta Leigh
Flopsy insists on going to the beach by herself. Torchy and Squish are miffed, so they decide to steal her picnic basket, but ultimately, they hide inside of it to give her a fright.: Songs: "Frutown" (Pom-Pom)
28	2	"Torchy Gets a Surprise"	Vivian Milroy	Roberta Leigh
Bossy Boots wants to take Flopsy back to earth, but the ragdoll refuses. However, Flopsy is lonely, so Torchy returns with Pom-Pom to keep her company. Later, King Dithers gives Torchy a Penny Farthing bicycle.: Songs: "Flopsy" & "King Dithers, the Dithery King."; Note: This story bridges the series one episodes "Bossy Boots is Taught a Lesson" and "A Bell for a Penny-Farthing."
29	3	"Banana Bridge"	Vivian Milroy	Roberta Leigh
Flopsy has lost so much stuffing that Torchy insists Pom-Pom gives the dolly some of her fur. Later, the toys want to use a banana as a bridge, but they do not have the strength to move it on their own, so Torchy visits the caves, where he finds Daffy the donkey.: Song: "In Topsy Turvy Land" (Flopsy); Note: This story bridges the series one episodes "A Bell for a Penny-Farthing" and "A Trick on Pom-Pom."
30	4	"King Dithers and Daffy"	Vivian Milroy	Roberta Leigh
Torchy and Pom-Pom miss Mr Bumble-Drop, who declines their invitation to come to Topsy Turvy Land. Meanwhile, Daffy feels like she has no purpose. Coincidentally, King Dithers has just ordered a new coach, so Torchy suggests that the mule should pull it.: Songs: "In Topsy Turvy Land" (Flopsy), "I've Got a Penny-Farthing" (Torchy), and "King Dithers, the Dithery King."; Note: This story bridges the series one episodes "A Trick on Pom-Pom" and "Torchy is Stolen."
31	5	"The Toys Get the Collywobbles"	Vivian Milroy	Roberta Leigh
When all of the toys come down with bellyaches, King Dithers informs them that they can remedy the situation by eating vegetables.: Songs: "In Topsy Turvy Land" (Flopsy) and "Frutown" (Pom-Pom).; Note: The Man in the Moon randomly appears as one of the residents of Topsy Turvy Land.
32	6	"Bogey Learns Another Lesson"	Vivian Milroy	Roberta Leigh
Bogey amuses himself by filling Flopsy with nuts and bolts, which weigh her down, so King Dithers punishes him by making him wear a suit of armour. Meanwhile, Whirly mentions there is a treasure chest in the caves, so Pongo decides to steal it.: Song: "I'm Pongo the Pirate"; Note: This story bridges the series one episodes "Bad Boy Bogey" and "Torchy and the Strange Animal."
33	7	"The Polliken Bird Is Stolen"	Vivian Milroy	Roberta Leigh
Pongo arrives at the castle and learns that Pollikan has the king's crown in his beak, so he lures the bird onto his boat. Ting-a-Ling figures out what has happened and enlists Torchy to rescue Pollikan.: Song: "I'm Pongo the Pirate"
34	8	"Torchy Has an Accident"	Vivian Milroy	Roberta Leigh
When he cannot find Pom-Pom, Torchy decides to fashion a dog whistle from a piece of tin, but he ends up swallowing it. Possessing only the ability to whistle, Torchy cannot use his magic beam, so all of the toys convene to try to discern a solution.: Song: "In Topsy Turvy Land" (Flopsy)
35	9	"Sparky the Dragon"	Vivian Milroy	Roberta Leigh
When Whirly gets a stiff neck, Torchy suggests that Sparky breathe on him to loosen it up. Meanwhile, Pom-Pom gets chocolate paw prints all over Torchy's house, and she is less than thrilled when he insists she clean up.: Song: "I'm Pom-Pom the Poodle"; Note: It is possible that this aired after the first series episode "Torchy and the Strange Animal".
36	10	"Bogey Is Naughty Again"	Vivian Milroy	Roberta Leigh
Torchy discovers Bogey is just as awful as ever, so he and Pom-Pom return to earth. Bogey ties a tin can to the poodle's tail, so Mr Bumble-Drop reprimands him and lures him to the rocket. Bogey is unwillingly whisked away to Topsy Turvy Land, where Squish ties a tail and tin can onto the boy and forces him to walk through town.: Song: "The Naughty Children Song" (Torchy); Note: The Man in the Moon makes another random appearance as a resident of Topsy Turvy Land. Unlike in "The Toys Get the Collywobbles", his face is clearly seen.
37	11	"Pilliwig Cleans the Chimney"	Vivian Milroy	Roberta Leigh
In an attempt to be funny, Pilliwig is unintentionally rude to Torchy. To redeem his sins, he agrees to sweep the king's chimney.: Songs: "King Dithers, the Dithery King" & "I'm Pollikan"
38	12	"Pongo the Pirate"	Vivian Milroy	Roberta Leigh
Pongo wants a companion to cook for him, so he decides to kidnap Flopsy.: Song: "I'm Pongo The Pirate"
39	13	"Pongo and the Gold Mine"	Vivian Milroy	Roberta Leigh
Pongo steals all of Clinker's money while he is asleep. When Clinker and Squish go into the mine to retrieve some gold bars, Pongo follows them and ties them up. Eventually, Torchy comes to their rescue.: Songs: "I'm Pongo the Pirate" and "Frutown" (Flopsy)
40	14	"King Dithers' Birthday"	Vivian Milroy	Roberta Leigh
King Dithers throws a birthday party for himself and invites all of the toys to attend. They amass some unusual gifts, and Torchy puts too much baking powder in his cake, which makes it so light that it nearly carries him away.: Song: "In Topsy Turvy Land" (Torchy)
41	15	"Washing Day in Topsy Turvy Land"	Vivian Milroy	Roberta Leigh
After the toys have hung their washing on the clothesline to dry, an orange juice rainstorm blows through and keeps them drenched. Torchy enlists Sparky to blow dry them, but the sickly dragon is only able to muster a sooty vapour that worsens the situation.: Songs: "In Topsy Turvy Land" (Flopsy) & "I'm Pom-Pom the Poodle"
42	16	"The Gluebell Wood"	Vivian Milroy	Roberta Leigh
Whirly and Sparky discover a fairy, who's recently arrived in Topsy Turvy Land. They invite her to a party and gather flowers for the centerpiece, but discover that the gluebells are sticky, which causes some irritation for their friends.: Song: "In Topsy Turvy Land" (Torchy); Note: This episode features the only additional character to appear in the second series. However, the fairy is a redressed puppet who infrequently appeared as the mother of Bossy Boots.
43	17	"Squish Falls Down a Well"	Vivian Milroy	Roberta Leigh
Squish is perplexed when his squirt gun is suddenly empty, so he goes in search of water to refill it. The king informs him of a wishing well, so the boy climbs down in the bucket and gets stuck. Torchy attempts a rescue, but he too winds up inside of the well.: Song: "King Dithers, the Dithery King"
44	18	"Flopsy in Trouble"	Vivian Milroy	Roberta Leigh
As Flospy relaxes on the beach, the Ting-a-Ling bird spies what it thinks is a worm. It swoops down and flies away with the would-be meal, which turns out to be Flopsy's stuffing. Torchy attempts to repack the dolly, but he puts the stuffing in upside-down, resulting in Flopsy speaking backwards.: Song: "In Topsy Turvy Land" (Torchy)
45	19	"The Big Storm"	Vivian Milroy	Roberta Leigh
Torchy arrives back on Topsy Turvy Land the night of a great hurricane. As he rushes the toys to safety in the caves, the wind snatches him and blows him back to earth.: Song: "In Topsy Turvy Land" (Flopsy); Note: This story bridges the series one episodes "The Twins Learn a Lesson" and "King Dithers Goes Down to Earth."
46	20	"Daffy's Birthday"	Vivian Milroy	Roberta Leigh
Daffy has grown weary of pulling the king's carriage, so she runs away on his birthday. Pongo finds her on the beach and harnesses the mule to his ship.: Song: "I'm Pollikan" and "I'm Pongo the Pirate"
47	21	"Flopsy Makes a Christmas Pudding"	Vivian Milroy	Roberta Leigh
Torchy gets some coins to bake inside of the king's Christmas pudding, but the greedy Clinker decides to retrieve them and falls into the pot, and he is accidentally baked by Flopsy.: Song: "King Dithers, the Dithery King"
48	22	"Gillygolly in Trouble"	Vivian Milroy	Roberta Leigh
Gillygolly is tired of his afro, so he visits Torchy's home in hopes of obtaining some peanut oil to straighten his hair. Torchy is out, so Gillygolly takes a nap. Pom-Pom is jealous of his naturally curly tresses, so she decides to shave them off and claim them for her own.: Songs: "I'm Pom-Pom the Poodle" and "Topsy Turvy Land" (Torchy)
49	23	"King Bumble Drop"	Vivian Milroy	Roberta Leigh
During Mr Bumble-Drop's first visit to Topsy Turvy Land, King Dithers goes mad with power and begins implementing various rules. The toys revolt, lock Dithers in the dungeon, and proclaim Bumble-Drop the new king.: Song: "I'm Pom-Pom the Poodle"; Note: This story is set after the series one episode "Torchy is Saved at Last."
50	24	"A New Suit for Pilliwig"	Vivian Milroy	Roberta Leigh
Ena knits a ridiculously large sweater for Pilliwig, which he is forced to wear after Torchy accidentally splatters his suit with paint. Ena volunteers to wash it, but she puts too much starch in the garment, which begins to dance on the clothesline, as if alive.: Song: "I've Got a Penny-Farthing" (Torchy); Note: This story is immediately followed by the series one episode "Torchy and the Man on the Moon."
51	25	"The Obstinate Donkey"	Vivian Milroy	Roberta Leigh
When Pongo's grapefruit sloop springs a leak, he steals Daffy's umbrella to use as a boat.: Song: "Frutown" (Pom-Pom)
52	26	"Pom-Pom Gets the Hiccups"	Vivian Milroy	Roberta Leigh
Torchy searches for a remedy when Pom-Pom gets the hiccups. Meanwhile, back on earth, Bossy Boots attempts to cheer up Mr Bumble-Drop by posing as his new dog.: Song: "Frutown" (Pom-Pom)

== Production ==
Creator Roberta Leigh and producer Gerry Anderson had previously collaborated on the puppet show The Adventures of Twizzle, which was so successful that they were asked to do another show. The pair were able to negotiate more money nearly double what was spent on Twizzle, which afforded them the luxury of bringing more elaborate visuals to the screen.

Leigh churned out her scripts quickly, reportedly writing all 52 episodes over a total of 26 days. With her eight-year-old son in mind as the show's target demographic, Leigh set out to write an adventurous show, claiming that she was not pushing to include morality tales, but morals naturally came through her stories. As with Twizzle, Leigh devised recurring songs for many of the characters and would hum her tunes to composer Barry Gray, who was tasked with translating them into musical chords.

Puppet maker Christine Glanville began developing the look of Anderson's later "Supermarionation" shows, crafting the puppet bodies from wood, and sculpting heads with movable eyes and mouths, as well as adding thinner strings to make them less visible on film. Made in her garage, crafting the toys was a family affair, with Glanville's father creating the bodies, her mother sewing the clothes, and Christine sculpting the heads and putting finishing touches on the dolls.

The crew began tinkering with automatic lip-sync on two minor characters, and Glanville thought thin rubber might be the way to create the mouths, so she sent her father on a quest to buy condoms from various local vendors. This idea wound up being infeasible because the thin rubber was prone to breakage and paint would not stick to it, so they later switched to chamois leather.

Reg Hill and Derek Meddings created three-dimensional sets using cardboard cut-outs and wood, with a higher degree of detail than they could muster in Twizzle. Their Torchy sets included an elaborate miniature town shaped like fruit, with trees, shrubs, and rocks made of coal, as well as fully furnished miniature interior sets.

They could not afford a studio, so the production was set up in the ballroom of the Islet Park House, a mansion in Maidenhead on the banks of the River Thames. Unfortunately, a lack of space caused problems. The stage area was only about 20 square feet, with a cramped bridge that spanned the length of it for the puppeteers to perform on When the carpenters turned on their saws to create sets for the next day's shooting, the puppeteers were unable to sync to the audio playback.

Complicating matters, the river flooded that winter. Although the mansion's interior remained dry, the only way to get in and out of the location was by rowboat. "When the river overflowed, we would stand on the ballroom's impressive veranda and watch the water rush past us below," recalled set dresser Bob Bell. "It was really quite frightening!" Filming of the first series concluded in April 1959.

The show was popular, garnering the attention of an up-and-coming band named The Beatles, who performed the title theme song live at The Cavern Club. At the start of 1969, Paul McCartney even riffed a portion of song during the recording sessions for the band's final album, Let It Be.

== Merchandising ==
A small assortment of merchandise was issued during the show's run, most notably a series of books by creator Roberta Leigh, including an annual "Gift Book" from 1960–1964. Many of the featured stories were short adaptations of her scripts. Other merchandise included the board game Torchy's Race to Topsy Turvy Land, a children's playsuit which was packaged with a cardboard Torchy puppet, a pocketwatch, and a Torchy marionette by popular toymakers Pelham Puppets

=== Books ===
1. Torchy and the Magic Beam (1960)
2. Torchy in Topsy Turvy Land (1960)
3. Torchy Gift Book (1960)
4. Torchy Gift Book (1961)
5. Torchy and Bossy Boots (1962)
6. Torchy and His Two Best Friends (1962)
7. Torchy and the Twinkling Star (1962)
8. Torchy Gift Book (1962)
9. Torchy the Battery Boy Goes to a Party (196?)
10. Torchy Gift Book (1963)
11. Torchy Gift Book (1964)

=== Comics ===
Torchy appeared weekly from August 1960 to August 1961 across 52 issues of Harold Hare's Own Paper. The majority of characters were featured in the single-page comic strip, but Flopsy was referred to simply as Rag Doll (and she had normal eyes, as opposed to buttons), there was no Mr Bumble-Drop, and Whirly and Ena never appeared. Torchy did occasionally venture back to earth to contend with Bogey and Bossyboots (whose name, like PomPom's was condensed to one word).

In 1968, Leigh was the editor of "Wonder," a weekly comic book that was sold at Esso petrol stations. Each issue featured a tie-in coverstory for her subsequent show Wonder Boy and Tiger, as well as a strip titled Bossy Boots. The character bore no physical resemblance to the puppet (she sported glasses and wore her hair in a ponytail), but like her Torchy counterpart, Bossy Boots loved to tell everyone what to do.

==== Harold Hare's Own Paper ====
Roberta Leigh loosely adapted her own stories from numerous episodes for the untitled strips, but many of the details were altered.

#	Date	Summary	Notes
1	1960-08-20	On his birthday, Torchy emerges from his Pineapple home and stumbles on a Penny-Farthing bicycle, which his friends have wrapped and left on his doorstep. Torchy rides it right into Rag Doll, who insists he get a bell, and Ting-a-Ling Bird offers to do the job.	Adapted from "A Bell for a Penny-Farthing." In the show, King Dithers gives him the bike, and he crashes into Pilliwig. Torchy appears on the front cover, and the comic strip begins its run regularly placed on page 7.
2	1960-08-27	Torchy learns that the toys are frightened of something inside the cave, so he goes inside and discovers Sparky the dragon.	Adapted from "Torchy and the Strange Animal." Features the strip's only appearance of Gillygolly. In the absence of Whirly, there is a small gaggle of teddy bears.
3	1960-09-03	Pilliwig needs a home, so Torchy helps him pluck an apple from the tree, and PomPom pulls it on a sled to Frutown, where it's hollowed out and turned into a house.	Adapted from "The Building of Frutown." The cover includes a small image of Torchy's head, with his light shining onto the banner headline: "Meet Torchy the Battery Boy Inside!"
4	1960-09-10	PomPom agrees to give Rag Doll some hair for stuffing, provided she gets her remaining fur rolled up in curlers.	Adapted from "Topsy Turvy Land."
5	1960-09-17	King Dithers cannot find his gold medal, so Torchy uses his magic beam, and they discover Pollikan, who has the medallion in his mouth. The king decides to make the bird the keeper of the royal jewels.	Adapted from "King Dithers Loses His Crown."
6	1960-09-24	Rag Doll's silver teapot is missing, and so is King Dithers crown. They soon discover that Pongo the pirate has stolen the treasures, along with the Pollikan bird.	Adapted from "The Polliken Bird is Stolen."
7	1960-10-01	As they rocket back to earth, Torchy and PomPom see Bogey knocking over statues in the park, so they decide to scare him.	Adapted from "Bogey and the Statues."
8	1960-10-08	PomPom runs away to avoid donating more fur to Rag Doll, so Torchy produces a dog whistle and promptly swallows it. No one can get the whistle out until Daffy the Donkey passes by and offers to pull it free with her magnetic hooves.	Adapted from "Torchy Has an Accident."
9	1960-10-15	Pilliwig's suit is dirty, so Torchy washes it and Sparky dries it, but then they discover the garment was overstarched.	Adapted from "Washing Day in Topsy Turvy Land."
10	1960-10-22	Rag Doll knits a scarf for Torchy that's too long. The Battery Boy notices Pilliwig on the swing just moments before the vines break and the clown goes toppling to the ground, so he retrieves the scarf and uses it as a rope to hold the swing.	Original story.
11	1960-10-29	Torchy sees Bogey tying a can to a puppy's tail, so he brings the boy to Topsy Turvy Land, where Daffy the donkey sews a tail and can onto him.	Adapted from "Bogey is Naughty Again."
12	1960-11-05	Bogey fills Rag Doll full of nuts and bolts, so the king weighs the boy down with a suit of armour.	Adapted from "Bogey Learns Another Lesson."
13	1960-11-12	All of the toys are sick from eating too many sweets, so King Dithers teaches them to grow and eat vegetables.	Adapted from "The Toys Get the Collywobbles."
14	1960-11-19	PomPom insists on going to the beach alone, so Torchy and Rag Doll hide in a decoy picnic basket and scare her.	Adapted from "Flopsy Goes on a Picnic." Squish had not yet been introduced, so PomPom takes Flopsy's place, and she takes Squish's. The strip is moved to page 10, beginning in this issue.
15	1960-11-26	Pilliwig falls in a chocolate puddle and gets a stain on his suit. PomPom tries to lick the chocolate off and attempts to cover it with flour; Rag Doll offers to sew a patch over it. Ultimately, Torchy uses his magic beam and finds paint to cover the stain.	Original story.
16	1960-12-03	Daffy the donkey doesn't want to pull the king's coach in the hot sun, so Torchy holds an umbrella over the mule's head to shade him.	Original story. Combines elements of "Daffy's Birthday" and "The Obstinate Donkey."
17	1960-12-10	As they repaint his house, Torchy, Rag Doll, and PomPom are slopping paint everywhere, so they recruit Daffy to use her tail to paint the house. Once the donkey is done, they clean his tail and invite everyone over for dinner.	Original story.
18	1960-12-17	King Dithers burns his finger on the stove, and in the absence of a bandage, Torchy uses his magic beam to find nettles. In his rush to catch up to the Battery Boy, the King stubs his toe and requires a walking stick. Torchy pleads with Pongo to use his oar for a cane, and when the pirate refuses, Daffy chases him away. As the King returns to the castle with the oar under his arm, he thanks Torchy for his assistance by giving him an orange.	Original story.
19	1960-12-24	On Christmas Eve, Torchy and PomPom convince King Dithers to pose as Father Christmas, but the King gets stuck in Rag Doll's chimney.	Original story.
20	1960-12-31	Pilliwig enlists PomPom and Sparky to star alongside him in a circus performance, which they decide to throw at night. The sky is too dark for the Topsy Turvians to see what's going on, so Torchy uses his magic light to illuminate the show.	Original story.
21	1961-01-07	Sparky is tired of living in the caves, so Squish and Torchy build her a house with a mound of logs that they found in the forest. Unfortunately, they initially forget to build a chimney, and the dragon's breath smokes up the house. Torchy's magic beam leads him to King Dithers, who lends him a top hat to use as a smokestack.	Original story. First appearance of Squish. Mistakenly includes the first of two teasers for "next week['s]" story about Gluebells.
22	1961-01-15	PomPom's mirror falls off the wall and shatters. Squish suggests that she should use the water in the river to see her reflection, but the clumsy poodle falls in. As Rag Doll dries her and rolls her fur into curlers, Torchy utilises his beam to find a brass tray. After some polishing, PomPom uses the tray as a mirror.	Original story.
23	1961-01-21	Rag Doll feels unwell, so Pilliwig brings her orange juice and sticky gluebell flowers. The clown then attempts to cheer her by juggling her dishes, but they drop and shatter on the floor. Torchy's magic beam shines onto the gluebells, which they squeeze the nectar from to glue the plates back together.	Original story.
24	1961-01-28	King Dithers insists Daffy should take him into town in the rain, but when the King insists on using his umbrella, the mule bucks him off and straight into Torchy's window. Torchy uses his magic beam to find a deck chair, which they fashion into a covered wagon so Daffy can keep her umbrella.	Original story.
25	1961-02-04	Pongo steals Torchy's bicycle and buries it on the beach. When Torchy's magic beam shines his way, the pirate claims that he doesn't have the bike, but the tide rolls in and washes the sand away, revealing the treasured pedal cycle.	Original story.
26	1961-02-11	Everyone is spring cleaning but there are no brooms to be found, so Torchy fashions some from sticks and ferns. Rag Doll sweeps so hard that her stuffing falls out, so Torchy replaces it with ferns.	Original story.
27	1961-02-18	The wind blows so hard that it pushes everyone's homes into the lollipop fields, where a flood ensues. Torchy is baffled when the magic beam directs him toward the bed, but he realises the sheets can be used to fashion sails for the houses, to help glide them back to Frutown.	Original story.
28	1961-02-25	King Dithers sends the toys on a scavenger hunt which returns them to his kitchen, where they find a giant cake awaiting them.	Original story.
29	1961-03-04	Currently unknown. The previous week's teaser said "The Battery Boy helps make such a lovely bonfire."	Original story.
30	1961-03-11	Torchy's battery is running low, so he returns to Earth with PomPom to replace it. His cell completely drains, so as Pom-Pom goes to buy a new battery, Bossyboots finds Torchy and puts him in her toy cupboard, where he gets buried. As PomPom searches the cabinet, a cat leaps onto the toys, which sends them toppling out, revealing Torchy.	Original story. Sole appearance of Bossyboots.
31	1961-03-18	Rag Doll is absent from the party at King Dithers' castle, and they soon discover the reason why: Her cherry house is on fire! The toys race back to the castle for water and are able to put out the fire before much damage occurs.	Original story.
32	1961-03-25	Rag Doll is proud of the hollyhocks that she's been growing, but Squish and PomPom trample the flowers. Torchy shines his magic light on Pongo, who uncharacteristically donates his oars to hold up the blooms.	Original story.
33	1961-04-01	Squish climbs a tree and uses a hollow stick as a straw to shoot cherries at an unsuspecting PomPom. The poodle seeks aid from Torchy, who uses a water pistol to flush the space boy out of the branches.	Original story.
34	1961-04-08	Squish doesn't realise his own strength and pushes the swing so hard that Rag Doll flies into the field, where she gets covered by lollipops. Torchy makes Squish pull King Dithers' coach, to prove that the space boy is more muscular than he thinks.	Original story.
35	1961-04-15	Torchy brings Bad Boy Bogey to Topsy Turvy Land and instructs him to paint Rag Doll's cottage, but he paints her face as she sleeps, and the doll awakens, believing she has the measles.	Original story.
36	1961-04-22	Torchy and PomPom go in search of nuts to play conkers, but they cannot get into the magic wood without crossing a river, so they construct a bridge made from lollipops. On their way back from retrieving the conkers balls, the bridge collapses and PomPom gets wet. Torchy suggests that he puts in her curlers, and then they can play the game.	Original story.
37	1961-04-29	While berating Daffy the donkey for oversleeping, King Dithers falls into a hole. Daffy finds Torchy, who ties a rope to his bicycle and pulls his highness back up to Topsy Turvy Land.	Original story. Beginning with this issue and for the remainder of the comic's run, the Torchy strips were bumped up to page 5 and reduced to two-thirds of a page, with the remaining space filled by the paper's weekly "Once Upon a Time" stories by Donald Bisset.
38	1961-05-06	As Rag Doll helps Torchy wallpaper his home, he falls into the bucket of paste, and the doll has to scrub him down. Then the Battery Boy realises he's run out of wallpaper, so they head into the magic wood, where they retrieve leaves to adorn the walls.	Original story.
39	1961-05-13	Flopsy knits a sweater that's too big for Torchy and Sparky, so they give it to King Dithers.	Original story.
40	1961-05-20	The toys never know what time it is, so Torchy rockets back to earth to retrieve a toy Policeman with a pocket watch from the rubbish bin.	Original story. Torchy and PomPom talk to a toy shop owner who resembles Mister Geppetto from Disney's version of Pinocchio.
41	1961-05-27	Torchy and PomPom create a mailbox from an old log and toadstool, and they enlist Daffy to deliver it.	Original story.
42	1961-06-03	Pilliwig's tooth hurts so badly that he cannot go to King Dithers' party, so Torchy uses his beam to find a clove tree to provide the clown with some pain relief.	Original story.
43	1961-06-10	Rag Doll wants an apricot to bake a pie, but when the fruit proves to be too large to move, Torchy decides to fasten it to a pair of rollerskates and pull it home.	Original story.
44	1961-06-17	While frolicking at the seaside, Sparky gets so wet that she cannot breathe fire. Torchy asks Pongo to use his sail to dry her, and he steadfastly refuses, but while they argue, PomPom borrows the sail and dries the dragon.	Original story.
45	1961-06-24	Rag Doll is sad over the decaying state of her dress, so Torchy uses his magic beam to lead them to a pile of shiny leaves, which she uses to fashion a new dress.	Original story.
46	1961-07-1	The toys are bored by the playground equipment, so Torchy finds a ladder and wooden plank to construct a slide.	Original story.
47	1961-07-08	As Pilliwig and Torchy enjoy their tea, Daffy arrives with a load of balloons for them to blow up for King Dithers' birthday party. To speed the process, Torchy inflates them with his bicycle pump.	Original story.
48	1961-07-15	Rag Doll doesn't have enough fabric to curtain one of her windows, so Torchy picks berries and leaves and helps paste them to the glass.	Original story.
49	1961-07-22	Rag Doll puts her hair in curlers, but when it doesn't dry quickly enough, Torchy enlists Sparky to blow-dry her hair.	Original story.
50	1961-07-29	Torchy and Squish play ball at the seaside. When the current drags their ball away, Torchy uses his bicycle pump to inflate an orange so they can continue to play.	Original story.
51	1961-08-05	When the Ting-a-Ling bird gets distracted and flies off of Torchy's bicycle, he attaches a cuckoo clock to serve as a bell. Torchy attempts to startle Squish with the clock, but his plan backfires and he falls off the bike. Just then, Ting-a-Ling bird returns from his flight.	Original story.
52	1961-08-12	Rag Doll cannot keep her washing on the line on a windy day, so Torchy borrows PomPom's hair grips to use as clothespins.	Original story. Final Torchy comic of the series.
