= Arthur Provis =

English cinematographer and producer (1925–2016)

- Born: Arthur John Provis; 10 March 1925; Reading, Berkshire, England
- Died: 17 May 2016 (aged 91); England

Arthur John Provis (10 March 1925 – 17 May 2016) was an English cinematographer and producer, best known for co-founding AP Films ("Anderson-Provis" Films) with Gerry Anderson.

As a former Navy photographer forging a career operating rostrum cameras, he met Anderson filming a series called You've Never Seen This about unusual circus acts. Finding a shared interest in film-making, Provis teamed with Anderson, creating AP Films, with the original intention to make commercials. As a result of an advert featuring a puppet, the company was approached in 1957 by Roberta Leigh to create a children's series The Adventures of Twizzle for Associated-Rediffusion. This led to AP Films' early puppet shows, including Twizzle, Torchy the Battery Boy and Four Feather Falls, although Provis left the company amicably in 1959; he was cautious, and Anderson was adventurous. Provis was worried about the amount of film stock he and Anderson were using. He was also neurotic about the company going bust, in contrast to Anderson, who was determined to get the best possible result, even if it meant the company did go bust.

Whereas Anderson went on to produce his own puppet ("Supermarionation") programmes (including Supercar, Stingray and Thunderbirds, the last credited to AP Films), Provis continued his association with Roberta Leigh, producing and filming the puppet series Adventures of Sara and Hoppity (1961) and Space Patrol (1962-3).

A colour pilot episode for another puppet series called Paul Starr: Space Agent, about a James Bond-style action hero, failed to be commissioned, as did a 1967 live-action science fiction series The Solarnauts, for which Provis filmed the model sequences. Following this, Provis went back to filming commercials.

He died on 17 May 2016 at the age of 91.
