= Four Feather Falls =

1960 British children's TV series

- Genre: Children's fantasy western
- Created by: Gerry Anderson & Barry Gray
- Written by: Jill Allgood; Mary Cathcart Borer; Martin Woodhouse; Phil Wrestler
- Directed by: Gerry Anderson; David Elliott; Alan Pattillo
- Voices of: Kenneth Connor; Nicholas Parsons; Denise Bryer; David Graham
- Music by: Barry Gray
- Ending theme: "Two Gun Tex of Texas", sung by Michael Holliday
- Country of origin: United Kingdom
- Original language: English
- No. of series: 1
- No. of episodes: 39

Production
- Producer: Gerry Anderson
- Cinematography: Arthur Provis (eps. 1–11); John Read (eps. 12–39)
- Editors: Bert Rule; Alan Pattillo; David Elliott
- Running time: 12–13 minutes
- Production company: AP Films in association with Granada Television

Original release
- Network: ITV
- Release: 25 February – 17 November 1960

Four Feather Falls is a British children's western television series, the third puppet TV show produced by AP Films (APF) in association with Granada Television. It was based on an idea by Barry Gray, who also wrote the show's music. The series was the first to use an early version of APF's Supermarionation puppetry. Thirty-nine 13-minute episodes were produced between April 1959 and April 1960, and the series was first broadcast on the ITV network from February to November 1960.

The setting is the late 19th-century fictional Kansas town of Four Feather Falls, where the hero of the series, Tex Tucker, is a sheriff. The four feathers of the title refers to four magical feathers given to Tex by the Indian chief Kalamakooya as a reward for saving his grandson. One of the feathers allowed Tex's guns to swivel and fire without being touched whenever he was in danger, two conferred the power of speech on Tex's horse and dog, and the fourth feather could summon Kalamakooya.

Tex's speaking voice was provided by Nicholas Parsons, and his singing voice by Michael Holliday. The series was sporadically repeated on British television until 1968, and was released on DVD in 2005.

== Plot ==
The series is set in the fictitious late 19th-century Western town of Four Feather Falls, Kansas, and features the adventures of its sheriff, Tex Tucker.

In the first episode, Grandpa Twink relates the story of how it all began to his grandson, Little Jake. Tex is riding up from the valley and comes across a lost and hungry Indian boy, Makooya, and saves him. Tex is given four magic feathers by the boy's grandfather, Chief Kalamakooya, as a reward for saving his grandson. Two of the feathers allow his guns to swivel and fire automatically (often while Tex's hands are raised), (Note: The swivelling guns solved the problem of how a puppet cowboy could be quick on the draw without looking like he had gone into a spasm when one of his wires was suddenly yanked.) and the other two allow his horse, Rocky, and his dog, Dusty, to speak. As Tex, his horse, and dog are very thirsty, Kalamakooya also makes a waterfall where there had been no water before, and so when the town was built it was named after Tex's feathers and the waterfall.

The characters of the town are Grandpa Twink, who does little but rest in a chair; his grandson Little Jake, the only child in town; Ma Jones, who runs the town store; Doc Haggerty; Slim Jim, the bartender of the Denison saloon; Marvin Jackson, the bank manager; and Dan Morse, the telegraphist. Other characters appeared from time to time for only one episode, often just visiting town.

The villains included Pedro, who was introduced in the first show and Fernando, who first appeared in the second episode as a sidekick and someone Pedro could blame when things went wrong, as they always did. Big Ben was another villain who appeared from time to time, as did Red Scalp, a renegade Indian. Other villains only appeared in single episodes.

== Cast ==
- Nicholas Parsons – Sheriff Tex Tucker (speaking voice) / Telegraph Operator Dan Morse / Various
- Michael Holliday – Sheriff Tex Tucker (singing voice) / Various
- Kenneth Connor – Dusty the Dog / Rocky the Horse / Pedro the Bandit / Big Chief Kalamakooya / Bank Manager Marvin Jackson / Doc Haggerty / Saloon Owner Slim Jim Denison / Various
- David Graham – Grandpa Ebenezer Twink / Fernando the Bandit / Big Ben the Horse Rustler Bandit / Red Scalp the Renegade Indian / Various
- Denise Bryer – Martha "Ma" Jones / Little Jake / Makooya the Little Indian Boy / Various

Denise Bryer had worked with Anderson on The Adventures of Twizzle, and he wanted her to play some of the voices in Four Feather Falls. Anderson visited Bryer at her home with some scripts and asked her husband, Nicholas Parsons, to help by reading some of the other parts, including the sheriff Tex Tucker. Anderson liked Parsons' interpretation and offered him the job of providing Tex's speaking voice.

== Episodes ==
No.	Title	Directed by	Written by	Original release date	Prod. code
1	"How it Began"	Gerry Anderson	Mary Cathcart Borer	25 February 1960	1
While out in the desert Tex Tucker finds and shelters an Indian boy and is rewarded with four magic feathers by the boy's grandfather. Two of the feathers make his dog (Dusty) and horse (Rocky) speak while the last two control Tex's two guns. Tex decides to create a town called Four Feather Falls and the townsfolk make him Sheriff.
2	"Trouble in Yellow Gulch"	Gerry Anderson	Phil Wrestler	3 March 1960	10
Pedro and Fernando buy some land where a road into Four Feather Falls is and hold the townsfolk to ransom by making them pay to either use the safe route the bandits have bought or use a more dangerous road.
3	"Frame-Up"	Gerry Anderson	Phil Wrestler	10 March 1960	11
Tex rides off to the city to help out another Sheriff, unaware he is about to be set up as a horse thief.
4	"Pedro Has A Plan"	Gerry Anderson	Phil Wrestler	17 March 1960	3
Pedro and Fernando plan to rid themselves of the sheriff, by switching his hat with the magic feathers for a normal one.
5	"Sheriff for a Day"	Gerry Anderson	Phil Wrestler	24 March 1960	7
Tex is called away and lends his magic guns to Little Jake, who soon finds himself way over his head.
6	"Indian Attack"	Gerry Anderson	Phil Wrestler	31 March 1960	6
Pedro and Fernando fake an Indian attack on Four Feather Falls.
7	"A Close Shave"	Gerry Anderson	Phil Wrestler	7 April 1960	5
Pedro and Fernando team up with Red Scalp to plot against Tex.
8	"Pedro's Pardon"	Gerry Anderson	Phil Wrestler	14 April 1960	4
Pedro states that he has "gone straight" and will become a respectable member of the town but Tex does not believe his story.
9	"The Toughest Guy in the West"	Gerry Anderson	Phil Wrestler	21 April 1960	17
Grandpa Twink is a teller of tales and his buddies tease him about his supposed heroics. Twink redeems himself when he captures Indian Jack, a notorious renegade.
10	"Gun Runners"	Gerry Anderson	Phil Wrestler	28 April 1960	9
Tex and Dusty go off in search of a gun runner selling to renegade Indians, led by Red Scalp.
11	"Jail Break"	Gerry Anderson	Phil Wrestler	5 May 1960	21
Zack Morrill a bandit wanted for murder, cattle rustling, horse stealing and train robbery, has a wanted poster outside the Sheriff's office offering a reward of $500 for the capture of him. Pedro sees the poster and decides to help Tex capture the criminal in return for the reward money.
12	"Trapped"	David Elliott	Phil Wrestler	12 May 1960	14
Little Jake and Makooya head to the creek for some fishing. Finding a cave along the way they decide on a little spelunking. They interrupt Red Scalp at work while he is manufacturing counterfeit money and he quickly seals them in.
13	"Dusty Becomes Deputy"	Gerry Anderson	Phil Wrestler	19 May 1960	8
Pedro and Fernando set a fire on the outskirts of town to lure Tex away. All the while the bandits aim to rob the bank while Tex and the other townsfolk fight the fire.
14	"A Lawman Rides Alone"	David Elliott	Phil Wrestler	2 June 1960	20
Sheriff Tucker receives a wanted poster for Blackie and Whitey Strutt who, along with a third man robbed a Wells Fargo office. Soon the trio arrives in Four Feather Falls.
15	"Buffalo Rocky"	Alan Pattillo	Jill Allgood	2 June 1960	33
When several horses are stolen, the only suspects seems to be a buffalo. But it is actually a clever horse thief covering his tracks by wearing false buffalo hooves.
16	"Gunplay"	David Elliott	Phil Wrestler	9 June 1960	19
Two cattle rustlers, Johnny Pasto and The Nevado Kid, challenge Tucker to fight without his magic guns.
17	"Escort"	David Elliott	Phil Wrestler	16 June 1960	16
Pedro and Fernando overhear a message about a gold shipment heading to Four Feather Falls. So the pair pose as sheriffs so they can steal all the gold for themselves unaware that Big Ben also wants to steal the gold too.
18	"A Little Bit of Luck"	David Elliott	Phil Wrestler	23 June 1960	22
Tex is away visiting family and the marshal filling in for him, Ike Burns, is hopelessly ineffective. But the sheriff's a crook and is not a real lawman and is secretly in league with Big Ben and another outlaw called Johnny.
19	"The Best Laid Plans"	Gerry Anderson	Phil Wrestler	30 June 1960	15
A new face arrives in town, with a plan to rob the bank and quickly teams up with Pedro and Fernando to help his scheme.
20	"The Ma Jones Story"	Alan Pattillo	Jill Allgood	8 September 1960	29
Ma Jones falls for a scam by two con men and is almost swindled out of her shop.
21	"Election Day"	Gerry Anderson	Phil Wrestler	11 August 1960	25
On election day for the role of Sheriff, Pedro decides to make a bid for the position but when he tries to cheat the town turns on him.
22	"Gunfight on Main Street"	David Elliott	Phil Wrestler	18 August 1960	26
Tex's old friend, Cass Morgan, arrives in town looking for two men, Tobin and Billy Pinto, who he says killed his brother during a robbery. He tells Tex to stay out of it which he does until a telegram arrives telling Tex who the real killer is.
23	"Chance of a Ghost"	Gerry Anderson	Phil Wrestler	28 July 1960	18
Marvin Jackson is trying to sell the Eureka Silver Mine, but the main buyer, Harman, pays Pedro and Fernando to pretend to be ghosts to bring the price down.
24	"Once A Lawman"	David Elliott	Phil Wrestler	4 August 1960	24
With the townspeople unhappy with Tex's dealing of a spate of robberies by a gang of thieves, Tex turns in his badge and joins the thieves as a crook.
25	"Landgrabbers"	Gerry Anderson	Phil Wrestler	11 August 1960	23
The Circle Z Ranch is under siege from Morg Fenton and Big Ben, but Tex discovers it is outside his area of jurisdiction and cannot help defend it.
26	"A Cure For Everything"	Alan Pattillo	Jill Allgood	18 August 1960	31
A medicine man arrives in town claiming to have a cure for everything and almost puts Doc Haggerty out of business before it is discovered where the true source of the medicine comes from.
27	"Bandits Abroad"	David Elliott	Jill Allgood	25 August 1960	30
Fernando bears a striking resemblance to another master criminal, called Pancho Gomez, so Pedro comes up with an idea to get the $200 reward money for capturing him.
28	"Safe As Houses"	David Elliott	Martin Woodhouse	1 September 1960	34
Missouri Mike arrives in town claiming to be able to sell things to people they did not even know they wanted including selling safes $5 each with a free bottle of brandy. But the brandy is drugged and Mike is actually a criminal planning to rob the town blind with a master key to the safes.
29	"Gold Is Where You Find It"	Gerry Anderson	Phil Wrestler	8 September 1960	13
Pedro and Fernando try to swindle the people of Four Feather Falls out of their savings by claiming to have found gold on their land.
30	"Gold Diggers"	Gerry Anderson	Phil Wrestler	15 September 1960	12
Fernando and Pedro try and get arrested so they can spend the night in jail. The pair want dig underneath the jailhouse and on into the bank to rob it.
31	"First Train Through"	Alan Pattillo	Jill Allgood	22 September 1960	35
The railroad finally comes to Four Feather Falls connecting it to Dallas, however someone keeps sabotaging the tracks.
32	"A Bad Name"	David Elliott	Phil Wrestler	29 September 1960	32
Big Ben needs Tex's help after being falsely accused of stealing cattle.
33	"Kidnapped"	Gerry Anderson	Mary Cathcart Borer	6 October 1960	2
Pedro and Fernando take "Doc" Haggerty and hold him hostage for ransom.
34	"Teething Troubles"	David Elliott	Jill Allgood	13 October 1960	32
Rocky has a toothache, but nothing anyone says can persuade him to have his tooth removed by Doc Haggerty.
35	"Fancy Shooting"	David Elliott	Martin Woodhouse	20 October 1960	36
The 'fastest and bestest in the westest' Gunman, Buck Reevers, arrives in town, worrying Tex that he will attract other gunmen to the town.
36	"Ride 'Em Cowboy"	Alan Pattillo	Jill Allgood	27 October 1960	39
Tex takes part in the rodeo against Silver City's best rider, Bart Stevens, who decides to cheat by using Pedro and Fernando to sabotage his opponent.
37	"Ambush"	David Elliott	Jill Allgood	3 November 1960	38
Red Scalp leads an Indian war party on a raid to ambush the train from Dallas and steal the $10,000 payroll on board, with the help of the bank messenger William J. Haddon.
38	"Horse Thieves"	Alan Pattillo	Phil Wrestler	10 November 1960	28
Big Ben tells Pedro and Fernando that a partner of his is paying good money for horses. He persuades the banditos to steal all of the horses in Four Feather Falls, which they do including Tex's own horse Rocky.
39	"Happy Birthday"	Alan Pattillo	Jill Allgood	17 November 1960	37
The townspeople plan a party for Tex's birthday.

== Production ==
American Western TV shows such as Gunsmoke and Wagon Train were popular with British audiences, so APF's Gerry Anderson and Arthur Provis decided to make a cowboy series based on a story concept pitched to them by Barry Gray. According to Anderson, Four Feather Falls "was really me trying to make the sort of films I used to see in the cinema." APF offered Gray about £100 (£2,000 in 2025) to buy his idea, which was originally titled Two Gun Tex Tucker. This was changed to Two Gun Tex of Texas, then The Sheriff of Four Feather Falls before the final title was chosen.

Development began in late 1958 while the first 26 episodes of Torchy the Battery Boy were still in production, and without the knowledge of APF's employer Roberta Leigh, with whom Anderson planned to sever ties in the aim of becoming an independent producer. The pilot episode, "How It Began", was produced in April 1959 on a budget of £6,000 (about £121,000 in 2025). A full series of 39 episodes was commissioned by Granada after APF's intended distributor, Anglo-Amalgamated, turned it down. Except for the pilot, which was made in APF's studios at Islet Park House in Maidenhead, all episodes were made in a converted warehouse on the Slough Trading Estate. Previously owned by special effects artist Les Bowie, this provided quadruple the floor space of Islet Park House, where the crew had been filming in a re-purposed ballroom. After moving to the Slough estate in June 1959, APF upgraded its new facilities with the installation of a director's control booth and video assist TV monitors to guide the puppeteers, who operated the marionettes from a Dexion bridge built several feet over the set. The model set representing the town of Four Feather Falls measured 30 by 15 feet (9.1 m × 4.6 m). Filming in Slough ended in April 1960.

Anderson considered the puppets with static heads, made by Christine Glanville for his earlier productions, to be unacceptable because the viewer could not tell which character was talking unless its puppet moved up or down. For Four Feather Falls, the papier-mâché heads were replaced by interchangeable hollow fibreglass heads with internal rods that could move the eyes from side to side. The heads also contained sound-activated solenoids, which allowed the puppets' lips to move automatically in synchronisation with the dialogue. The electronics of the day required more space than would be available in a human-scale head, therefore all the puppets in Four Feather Falls had oversized heads, though the bodies as a whole were one-third life size. Anderson's aim was to make the puppets look as realistic as possible, the beginning of the Supermarionation puppetry process, although that term was not coined until his next series, Supercar.

The wires used to control the puppets were eight feet long and made of tungsten steel, an improvement on the curtain wire used in Anderson's two earlier puppet series (The Adventures of Twizzle and Torchy), and were only 1/200 of an inch thick. Being shiny, the wires had to be blackened. The horses moved by being pulled along on a trolley, which meant the viewer never saw their feet when they were moving.

The voice cast assembled to record each script without seeing the puppets, much like recording a radio series; synchronisation of each character's speech with the movement of its puppet's mouth was performed later. The tight budget precluded the use of sophisticated special effects, and less costly alternatives were used. For example, to achieve the effect of muzzle flashes, small specks of black paint were carefully applied to the 35 mm negatives so they would appear as white flashes on the finished prints. The production design and puppet costuming were more detailed than those of Twizzle and Torchy.

Continuity for the series was provided by Sylvia Thamm, who later married Gerry Anderson. Provis, who left APF mid-production due to disagreements over the direction of the company, was given a five per cent share of the profits from the series.

== Music ==
The show's music and song lyrics were composed by Barry Gray. Michael Holliday provided Tex's singing voice, and Tommy Reilly performed the harmonica pieces. The best known song to come out of the series was "Four Feather Falls", sung in some episodes by Michael Holliday in the style of Bing Crosby and sometimes incorrectly described as the theme song to the series. The closing theme song was "Two Gun Tex of Texas." Holliday was paid £2,000 (about £40,000 in 2025) for his singing work on the pilot episode – a significant part of the pilot's £6,000 budget. In all, Holliday recorded six songs for the series: "Four Feather Falls", "The Phantom Rider", "The Rick-Rick-A-Rackety Train", "Happy Hearts and Friendly Faces", "My Home Town", and "Two Gun Tex of Texas". The recording was conducted at Gate Studios in Borehamwood.

== Syndication ==
Four Feather Falls was the first APF series to be fully networked on ITV, that is shown by all regional franchises of the network simultaneously. The series was repeated in some British TV regions on a sporadic basis up until 1968. In December 2004, it was announced that the rights had been acquired by Network, and it was released on three Region 2 DVDs in May 2005. It is the only Supermarionation series not yet released to DVD in North America as of January 2006. Sylvia Anderson wrote two British children's annuals based on the show, published by Collins in 1960 and 1961. The first book featured a short text story based on the pilot episode of the TV series.

== Other media ==
The show was adapted into comics form and published as an ongoing strip in Polystyle Publications' TV Comic. The Four Feathers Falls strip was drawn by Neville Main, and appeared from issue No. 439 (14 May 1960) until issue No. 564 (6 October 1962). Sylvia Anderson wrote a Four Feather Falls annual. A tie-in board game was also released.
