= Roberta Leigh =

British novelist and television writer (1926–2014)

- Born: Rita Shulman; 22 December 1926; London, England
- Died: 19 December 2014 (aged 87); London, England
- Education: St Mary's Convent, Rhyl, Wales
- Occupations: Writer, filmmaker, composer, painter
- Spouse: Michael Lewin (m. 1948; died 1981)
- Children: 1
- Writing career
- Pen name: Roberta Leigh, Rachel Lindsay, Janey Scott, Rozella Lake
- Period: 1950–2013
- Genres: Romantic novels, children's stories, science fiction, romantic murder mysteries

Roberta Leigh was an assumed name for Rita Lewin (née Shulman) (22 December 1926 – 19 December 2014) who was a British author, artist, composer and television producer. She wrote romance fiction and children's stories under the pseudonyms Roberta Leigh, Rachel Lindsay, Janey Scott and Rozella Lake.

She published her first novel in 1950 and was still actively working on new titles until a year before her death. In addition, she wrote and produced the children's puppet television series The Adventures of Twizzle, Sara and Hoppity, Torchy the Battery Boy, Wonder Boy and Tiger, Send for Dithers and Space Patrol.

== Life and career ==
Best known as Roberta Leigh, she was born Rita Shulman in London to sometimes-poor Jewish parents who had emigrated from Russia. In 1948, she married Michael Lewin, with whom she had one son, and was widowed in 1981. She died age 87 on 19 December 2014.

Leigh wrote her first romantic fiction at age 14, while still a schoolgirl at St Mary's convent in Rhyl. She published a romance in 1950 as Roberta Leigh, the first of over 160 novels. She also published children's books and romances under the pseudonyms Janey Scott, Rachel Lindsay, and Rozella Lake. Following the death of her husband, she stopped writing romance novels but continued to produce serious fiction and children's books while developing various television and film projects. She made a total of 275 cinematic works, becoming the first woman producer in Britain to have her own film company.

She created seven puppet TV series: The Adventures of Twizzle (1957), Torchy the Battery Boy (1958), Sara and Hoppity (1962), Space Patrol aka Planet Patrol (1962), Paul Starr (1964), Send for Dithers (1966), and Wonder Boy and Tiger (1967); and the animated educational program Picture The Word (1965). Twizzle and Torchy were made in collaboration with Gerry Anderson, then Leigh and Anderson parted ways, Leigh to create Sara and Hoppity (1962) and Anderson to create Four Feather Falls (1960).

Space Patrol was syndicated around the globe and achieved the highest ratings of any children's show up to that time, chronicling the year 2100 adventures of Captain Larry Dart of the spaceship Galasphere 347. This was followed by the Paul Starr (1964), and a live-action colour space adventure series, The Solarnauts (1967). For these two later series, however, only the pilot episodes were filmed.

Leigh developed a keen interest in music during childhood, and was credited as the composer for most of her shows. However, most of her compositions were simply hummed into a tape recorder and translated into a score by a composer. She did, however, tinker with electronic equipment to create the opening theme for Space Patrol, after asking a shop clerk for something that made interesting sounds. In addition to collaborations on Twizzle and Torchy, Leigh teamed with Barry Gray for three musical compositions (Riding My Bike, Sleeping Time and Why?) featured on Vera Lynn's 1955 album "Songs for Children." Her surname appears as Lee on the record, but the proper spelling is featured on the sheet music. In addition to two tie-in albums for Twizzle, Leigh also reinterpreted the popular stories Cinderella and Jack and the Beanstalk with original songs, plus she wrote and narrated The Wonderful Story of How You Were Born, a frank spoken-word sex education record.

=== Paul Starr ===
Though made in 1964, Paul Starr appeared to be a decade ahead of Space Patrol. A 25-minute marionette puppet series in the same vein as Space Patrol, it was produced in colour. Agent Paul Starr and his crewman, Lightning, work for the Space Bureau of Investigation (SBI). They have a squat rocket, SBI-5, which can travel through space, in air and underwater (SBI uses an undersea base). While jets propel the craft through the air, in space it is powered by "solar energy". It is armed with various weapons, including nuclear missiles. The robots of Paul Starr appear to be more developed and fans of Space Patrol will notice the similar sound effects used. The movements of the puppet characters are "less wooden" and there are no sign of strings. Only a pilot episode was filmed and shown, but the series was not picked up.

The puppets were made by Martin and Heather Granger who, with Joan Garrick, also operated them. Realistic mouth movements were used long before the arrival of Terrahawks in the 1980s. Actor Edward Bishop provided the voice of Paul Starr; other voices were provided by Patricia English, Dick Vosburgh and Peter Reeves. Besides creating and scripting the series, Leigh also wrote the title song and lyrics (sung by Jerry Dane). Arthur Provis served as director of photography and co-producer.

In this adventure, Starr's boss sends him to Mars where five atomic power stations (used to pump water) have been destroyed by fire. Starr and Lightning work as security guards to try to uncover the cause. The chief suspect is General Darynx. The Martians are shown as non-human fish people.

=== The Solarnauts ===
This was a colour live-action space adventure TV series, produced in 1967, and starred John Garfield, Jr. and Derek Fowlds. Like Paul Starr, its filmed material survives.

== Bibliography ==
Books credited to Roberta Leigh, Rachel Lindsay, Janey Scott or Rozella Lake. Some novels were credited to both Roberta Leigh and Rachel Lindsay.

=== As Roberta Leigh ===
==== Romance novels ====
===== Single novels =====
- In Name Only (1950)
- Beloved Ballerina (1952)
- Dark Inheritance (1952)
- The Vengeful Heart (1952)
- And Then Came Love (1954)
- Pretence (1956)
- Stacy (1958)
- Storky (1962)
- My Heart's a Dancer (1970)
- Memory of Love (1971) also published as written by Janey Scott (1959)
- Cinderella in Mink (1973)
- Shade of the Palms (1974)
- If Dreams Came True (1974)
- Temporary Wife (1975)
- Man in a Million (1975)
- Cupboard Love (1976)
- To Buy a Bride (1976)
- Too Young to Love (1976)
- Man Without a Heart (1976)
- Unwilling Bridegroom (1976)
- Girl for a Millionaire (1977)
- Flower of the Desert (1977)
- Wrong Man to Love (1977)
- Not a Marrying Man (1977)
- Forgotten Marriage (1978)
- Night of Love (1978)
- Savage Aristocrat (1978)
- Facts of Love (1978)
- Love Match (1980)
- Wife for a Year (1980)
- Rent a Wife (1980)
- Love and No Marriage (1980)
- Heart of the Lion (1980)
- Confirmed Bachelor (1981)
- Love in Store (1983)
- No Time for Marriage (1985)
- Maid to Measure (1986)
- No Man's Mistress (1987)
- Too Bad to be True (1987)
- A Racy Affair (1987)
- An Impossible Man to Love (1987)
- Storm Cloud Marriage (1987)
- Not Without Love (1989)
- Man on the Make (1989)
- A Most Unsuitable Wife (1989)
- One Girl at a Time (1990)
- It All Depends on Love (1990)
- Two-faced Woman (1991)
- Not His Kind of Woman (1992)
- Bachelor at Heart (1992)
- Give a Man a Bad Name (1993)
- Two-Timing Man (1993)
- The Wrong Kind of Wife (1994)
- Misunderstood (2007)

===== Collections =====
- Pretence / The Vengeful Heart / My Hearts a Dancer (1983)

===== Omnibus (in collaboration) =====
- Night of Love / Shy Young Denbury / Lifetime to Love (1978) (with Audrey Blanshard and Ann Dabney)
- Facts of Love / Beth / Island Lovesong (1980) (with Louise Bergstrom and Barbara Hazard)

==== Children's stories ====
===== Tomahawk =====
1. Tomahawk (1960)
2. Tomahawk and the River of Gold (1960)
3. Tomahawk and the Animals of the Wild (1961)
4. Tomahawk and the Tomb of the White Moose (1961)

===== Twizzle =====
1. The Adventures of Twizzle (1958) – 18 stories

===== Sara and Hoppity =====
1. Sara and Hoppity (1960)
2. Sara and Hoppity Make New Friends (1960)
3. Sara and Hoppity Find a Cat (1961)
4. Sara and Hoppity Get Lost (1961)
5. Meet Sara and Hoppity (1962)
6. Sara and Hoppity Go to the Fair (1961)
7. Sara and Hoppity Go to the Seaside (1961)
8. Sara and Hoppity Stay on a Farm (1961)
9. Sara and Hoppity Spring Clean their House (1961)
10. Sara and Hoppity on a Big Ship (1961)

===== Torchy =====
1. Torchy and the Magic Beam (1960)
2. Torchy in Topsy Turvy Land (1960)
3. Torchy and Bossy Boots (1962)
4. Torchy and His Two Best Friends (1962)
5. Torchy and the Twinkling Star (1962)

===== Mr. Hero =====
1. The Adventures of Mr. Hero (1961)
2. Mr. Hero and the Raggler Children (1961)
3. Mr. Hero and the Pearly Queen
4. Mr. Hero and the Animal
5. Mr. Hero in Bongo Island
6. Mr. Hero and Puss the Octo
7. Mr. Hero helps a Family
8. Mr. Hero in Iceland

=== As Rachel Lindsay ===
==== Romance novels ====
- The Widening Stream (1952) aka A Man of Affairs (1979)
- Alien Corn (1954)
- Healing Hands aka Love and Dr. Forrest (1955)
- Mask of Gold (1956)
- Castle in the Trees (1958)
- House of Lorraine (1959)
- The Taming of Laura (1959)
- Business Affair (1960)
- Heart of a Rose (1961)
- Song in My Heart (1961)
- Moonlight and Magic (1962)
- Design for Murder (1964) aka Designing Man (1978)
- Second Best Wife (1970)
- No Business to Love aka Brazilian Affair (1966)
- Price of Love (1967)
- Love and Lucy Granger (1967)
- Second Best Wife (1970) aka Substitute Wife (1982)
- The Latitude of Love aka Rough Diamond Lover (1971)
- A Question of Marriage (1972)
- Cage of Gold (1973)
- Shade of the Palms (1974)
- Food for Love (1974)
- Innocent Deception (1975)
- Love in Disguise (1975)
- Affair in Venice (1975)
- Prince for Sale (1975)
- Secretary Wife (1976)
- Roman Affair (1976)
- Tinsel Star (1976)
- A Man to Tame (1976)
- The Marquis Takes a Wife (1976)
- Forbidden Love (1977)
- Prescription for Love (1977)
- Unwanted Wife (1978) aka Melody of Love by Janey Scott (1960)
- Forgotten Marriage (1978)
- An Affair to Forget (1978) aka A Time to Love by Janey Scott (1960)
- Designing Man (1978) aka Design For Murder (1964)
- Man Out of Reach (1979)
- My Sister's Keeper (1979)
- A Man of Affairs (1979) aka The Widening Stream (1952)
- Man of Ice (1980)
- Love and No Marriage (1980)
- Wife For a Year (1980)
- Untouched Wife (1981)
- Substitute Wife (1982) aka Second Best Wife

=== As Janey Scott ===
==== Romance novels ====
- Memory of Love (1959) also published by Roberta Leigh
- Melody of Love (1960) aka An Affair to Forget (1978)
- A Time to Love (1960) aka Unwanted Wife (1978)

==== Children's stories ====
===== Sara Gay =====
1. Model Girl (1961)
2. Model Girl in Monte Carlo (1961)
3. Model Girl in New York (1961)
4. Model Girl in Mayfair (1961)

=== As Rozella Lake ===
==== Romance novels ====
- Chateau in Provence* (1973)
- If Dreams Came True* (1974)

(* also edited as Rachel Lindsay)

== Writing credits ==
Production	Notes	Broadcaster
The Adventures of Twizzle	52 episodes (1957–1958)	ITV
Torchy the Battery Boy	52 episodes (1960–1961)	ITV
Sara and Hoppity	52 episodes (1962–1963)	ITV
Space Patrol	39 episodes (1963–1964)	ABC Weekend TV
Paul Starr	Television film (1964)	ITV
