= The Sound of Silence (UFO) =

- UFO episode
- Episode no.: Episode 19
- Directed by: David Lane
- Written by: David Lane & Bob Bell
- Cinematography by: Brendan J. Stafford
- Editing by: Harry MacDonald
- Production code: 19
- Original air date: 7 October 1970

Cast
- Ed Bishop as Commander Straker; Michael Billington as Colonel Foster; Dolores Mantez as Lieutenant Barry; Ayshea Brough as Lieutenant Johnson; Basil Moss as Dr Frazer; Michael Jayston as Russ Stone; Susan Jameson as Anne Stone; Richard Vernon as Mr Stone; Nigel Gregory as Ben Culley; Gito Santana as the alien; Tom Oliver as a medical technician; Andrea Allan as a Moonbase operative; Keith Alexander the voice of a SHADO Interceptor pilot

Episode chronology
← Previous "The Cat with Ten Lives"	Next → "Destruction"

"The Sound of Silence" is the 19th episode of UFO, a British science fiction television series filmed by Century 21 Productions for ITC Entertainment. The 18th episode to be produced, it was directed by David Lane from a script that he wrote with Bob Bell, the series' art director. Shot at Pinewood Studios and on location in Jordans and Iver in Buckinghamshire, it was first broadcast on 7 October 1970 by Border Television.

Set in the 1980s, UFO depicts a secret military organisation – Supreme Headquarters Alien Defence Organisation (SHADO) – as it attempts to thwart an alien invasion involving UFOs. In "The Sound of Silence", SHADO investigates the disappearance of a showjumper after a UFO lands near a farm in England.

== Plot ==
A UFO is tailing GSP4, a NASA space capsule returning to Earth. SHADO Interceptors are prevented from shooting the UFO down due to its proximity to the capsule, which is carrying two astronauts. The UFO enters English airspace, where it evades SHADO's Sky 1. It lands near the 200-acre (0.31 sq mi; 0.81 km^{2}) wooded estate around Stone Dean Farm, a riding school owned by famous showjumper Russell "Russ" Stone, his sister Anne, and their father. SHADO Mobiles are sent to the vicinity to track down the UFO, but it remains elusive.

At the farm, Anne is being voyeuristically watched by Ben Culley, a vagrant whom Russ has repeatedly threatened for trespassing. The UFO's alien pilot, who has been scouting the area, murders Culley and hides the body. Russ and Anne are riding by a lake when they are struck by the lack of birdsong. Their horse breaks into a nervous sweat, but the source of its distress is unclear. Later, Russ vanishes while out riding. Anne and her father are searching the estate when they find the mutilated remains of Culley's dog.

The Stones file a missing person report which is relayed to SHADO. Colonel Foster is sent to the estate to interview Anne and her father. While driving through the woods in a jeep looking for Russ, Foster and Anne end up at the lake. Anne again notes the silence in the air, intriguing Foster. They find Culley's disfigured corpse.

Foster deduces that the UFO is hidden in the lake. The Mobiles converge on his position and fire rockets into the lake to flush out the UFO, which is then destroyed as it rises out of the water. The only substantial wreckage is a large cylinder, which is taken to SHADO HQ for analysis. Initially it is feared to be a bomb, but closer examination shows that it contains a human being – Russ Stone in a state of suspended animation, ready to be transported to the alien homeworld. Anne is brought to SHADO HQ to see her brother revived. Dr Frazer injects them both with the SHADO amnesia drug.

Some time later, Russ and Anne are back on the farm with no memory of incident. While discreetly checking in on them, Foster approaches Anne to enquire about taking riding lessons.

== Production ==
The episode was inspired by, and partly filmed at, Stone Dean Farm in Jordans, Buckinghamshire. Co-writer Bob Bell lived near Jordans and was a friend of the farmers. Guest characters Anne, Russ, and their father were given the surname Stone after the farm. The script was revised in May 1970.

"The Sound of Silence" was the first episode of UFO to be shot at Pinewood Studios following the closure of MGM-British Studios at the end of 1969. Production of the series had been given less studio space at Pinewood compared to MGM-British. To make best use of the space, Bell, UFO's art director, devised the interior of the Stone farmhouse as a permanent set which could be re-dressed and used in later episodes. It subsequently appeared as a living room in "The Cat with Ten Lives" and the inside of an apartment in "Destruction".

The production hiatus coincided with the departures of several regular cast members: George Sewell as Colonel Freeman, Gabrielle Drake as Lieutenant Ellis, and Keith Alexander as Lieutenant Ford. The SHADO officer played by Ayshea Brough, whom scripts were now calling Lieutenant Johnson, was made more prominent to serve as Ford's replacement. Though he was no longer playing a main character, Alexander can still be heard in "The Sound of Silence" as the voice of a SHADO Interceptor pilot. Andrea Allan, who had played a minor role in "A Question of Priorities", joined the regular cast as one of the Moonbase personnel. Animal sounds were supplied by an uncredited Percy Edwards.

Filming began on 1 June 1970. The lake and woodland scenes were shot at Black Park, several miles from Jordans. Actors Susan Jameson and Michael Jayston (Anne and Russ Stone) performed their own riding stunts on horses named Viking and Bluey. Scenes cut from the finished episode included one of Culley brawling with a fellow drifter called Joe. No new incidental music was recorded for the episode, which instead used stock music taken from earlier episodes of UFO, as well as episodes of Joe 90 and The Secret Service. A scene of Russ chasing Culley on horseback was accompanied by a piece from Joe 90's "Hi-jacked".

The episode was first broadcast in black and white by Border Television on 7 October 1970. It had its first UK colour showing on 6 January 1971 on Tyne Tees Television.

== Reception ==
Review website The Anorak Zone ranked "The Sound of Silence" the 12th-best episode of UFO, noting its "thin" and often "esoteric" plot and "off-kilter" guest characters. The website argued that because it was written by a pair of directors, the episode depends "more on mood and visuals than the dialogue". It found other episodes, with "weaker direction but stronger plots", to be more "narratively interesting".

In a negative review, John Kenneth Muir wrote that the episode "underachieves", with a lack of style and a "flaccid" pace. He questioned the script's choice to marginalise the main characters for a group of guests that he found hard to sympathise with, writing that Russ Stone is particularly unlikeable because of his hostility to Culley. He also wrote that while the battle between the UFO and the SHADO Mobiles is a "showstopper", Michael Billington's (Colonel Foster) performance in the scene "doesn't match the intensity" of the scale model effects shots. Muir was dissatisfied with the resolution to the alien abduction, stating that it "seems like a tailor-made opportunity to provide a few more breadcrumbs of knowledge about the aliens, but then the episode doesn't really deliver." He also disliked the last scene, finding Foster's actions sexually exploitative: "He returns to [Anne's] estate after she has been dosed with amnesia, and hits her up for thinly-veiled 'riding lessons'." He argued that the character has form for such behaviour, having made advances to another amnesiac woman in "The Dalotek Affair".

Chris Dale wrote that episode provides a "soft re-affirmation" that the aliens' primary objective, as determined in the first episode, is to procure human organs. Dale noted that while the episode "pushes the on-screen gore" with shots of mutilated corpses, the violence itself occurs off-screen. He also pointed out that the footage of the alien is limited to brief closeups of its face, and compares its "night-time lurking" to "something from a slasher movie". According to Dale, the episode highlights what makes the aliens "such chilling adversaries": "minimal on-screen violence, maximum off-screen implied butchery ... yet with no real animosity towards their victims".
