= Computer Affair =

- UFO episode
- Episode no.: Episode 16
- Directed by: David Lane
- Written by: Tony Barwick
- Cinematography by: Brendan J. Stafford
- Editing by: Harry MacDonald
- Production code: 2
- Original air date: 9 December 1970

Cast
- Ed Bishop as Commander Straker; George Sewell as Colonel Freeman; Peter Gordeno as Captain Carlin; Gabrielle Drake as Lieutenant Ellis; Harry Baird as Lieutenant Bradley; Dolores Mantez as Lieutenant Barry; Antonia Ellis as Lieutenant Harrington; Keith Alexander as Lieutenant Ford; Gary Myers as Lieutenant Waterman; Jeremy Wilkin as Lieutenant Maxwell; Georgina Moon as Lieutenant Howell; Maxwell Shaw as Dr Shroeder; Peter Burton as Dr Murray; Michael Mundell as Lieutenant Matthews; Nigel Lambert as Operative Granger; Hugh Armstrong as a SHADO Mobile officer; Shane Rimmer as Lieutenant Johnson and the captured alien; Hugo Panczak as the captured alien; Mel Oxley as the voice of SID

Episode chronology
← Previous "Flight Path"	Next → "The Responsibility Seat"

"Computer Affair" is the 16th episode of UFO, a British science fiction television series filmed by Century 21 Productions for ITC Entertainment. The second episode to be shot, it was written by Tony Barwick and directed by David Lane. It was filmed in May 1969 at MGM-British Studios and on location in Black Park, Wexham.

Set in the 1980s, UFO depicts the efforts of a secret organisation – Supreme Headquarters Alien Defence Organisation (SHADO) – to thwart an alien invasion involving UFOs. In "Computer Affair", SHADO personnel Bradley and Ellis are investigated after a failed UFO interception results in the death of a Moonbase pilot.

"Computer Affair" first aired on Border and Tyne Tees Television on 9 December 1970 and has received mixed reviews from commentators.

== Plot ==
Colonel Freeman is inspecting SHADO Moonbase when a UFO is detected on course for Earth. The Interceptor squadron are launched but the intruder evades their missiles. Moonbase chief Lieutenant Gay Ellis is slow to relay a course change to one of the Interceptors. The UFO collides with the Interceptor, killing pilot Matthews. Surviving the impact, the UFO makes it through Earth's atmosphere and into Canadian airspace, hiding from SHADO forces by submerging in a lake.

Commander Straker orders an inquiry into what went wrong. Ellis and the surviving pilots – Lieutenant Mark Bradley and Lieutenant Waterman – are recalled to Headquarters and submitted to psychoanalysis by a computer. Waterman is cleared to return to duty, but the report shows Ellis and Bradley have an emotional connection which is compromising their objectivity. Straker has them split up: Bradley will return to Moonbase, and Ellis will be re-posted on Earth. Freeman thinks Straker should not be so quick to trust the computer analysis.

In Canada, the UFO emerges from the lake and is shot down over a forest by Sky 1. Straker wants the alien occupants captured alive and brought in for questioning. He orders a recovery operation using SHADO Mobiles (armoured, tracked vehicles). Freeman, the field commander, defies Straker by assigning Ellis and Bradley to the mission. As the Mobiles converge on the downed UFO, it fires an energy weapon that destroys one of the Mobiles. Ellis sends in a second Mobile, whose crew includes Bradley. While searching on foot, Bradley and his comrades encounter the alien pilots, and a gunfight ensues. One of the aliens is shot dead, while Bradley subdues the other. The UFO self-destructs.

The surviving alien is brought to Headquarters and interrogated, but cannot or will not respond. Straker injects a truth serum to break down the alien's resistance, but it proves highly toxic to the alien, who dies screaming. Ellis tells Bradley his Mobile was not the best positioned to take on the UFO, but she ordered him in anyway to prove the computer wrong: she will not let her closeness to him get in the way of duty.

Unhappy with Straker's recent actions, Freeman resigns from SHADO. Straker is trying to talk him out of it when Bradley telephones and admits that the computer was correct: he and Ellis are emotionally involved. Seeing that Straker was right, Freeman retracts his resignation. Straker has a surprise for him: a second report has shown that, had Ellis followed accepted procedure during the UFO's approach, the entire Interceptor squadron would have been lost. Straker orders Ellis and Bradley back to Moonbase.

== Production ==
The episode's working title was "The Computer Affair". Although Barwick's script established that the episode is set in 1981, a line of dialogue in the finished episode indicates it is no earlier than 1984.

Principal photography was completed between 12 and 22 May 1969. The studio filming included a scene in which the Moonbase personnel throw a party for Lieutenant Bradley's 29th birthday; most of this scene was cut. Also deleted were scenes with actresses Norma Ronald (as Miss Ealand, Straker's secretary) and Penny Spencer (as a SHADO operative). The gunfight with the aliens was filmed in Black Park, Wexham. During the location shoot, Shane Rimmer, who was playing one of the aliens, suffered an asthma and claustrophobia attack in his sealed costume, forcing a break in filming. He subsequently quit the production and was replaced by Hugo Panczak.

The model effects shots feature a SHADO cargo aircraft whose studio miniature was adapted from a NASA plane seen in Century 21's film Doppelganger (1969). The look of the SHADO Mobiles was based on an army truck from the Joe 90 episode "Colonel McClaine". Each Mobile was built as a 21-inch-long (53 cm) miniature. For realism, the effects crew used real vegetation – juniper bark and spray-painted limonium – to create the trees and undergrowth in the forest scenes.

== Reception ==
"Computer Affair" has drawn comment for its implied interracial romance between the black Lieutenant Bradley (Harry Baird) and the white Lieutenant Ellis (Gabrielle Drake).

Although he found the pace slow, John Kenneth Muir praised the episode as "unique and worthwhile" for its exploration of technology and race issues, believing the topics are "handled well". Of the former, he wrote "what UFO seems to suggest is that computers may make recommendations based on facts, but a good commanding officer, such as Straker, will always reserve the final decision for himself." On the interpersonal dynamics, he observed that while the series implies "a post-racial future of equality [...] there is still, apparently, a sense of uneasiness about that new world order among individuals."

Ranking all the episodes of UFO, review website The Anorak Zone placed "Computer Affair" 18th. Despite praising the episode for its "goofiness", the website found fault with some aspects of the plot, such as Freeman's non-resignation from SHADO. According to the website, "the real problem" with the story is that the audience learns of Ellis and Bradley's relationship before the rest of the characters, "[s]o that rather than being taken by surprise, the audience is left waiting for the UFO personnel to catch up." It also criticised the treatment of race, noting that "such topics can often come over as ham-fisted when dealt with on television, and UFO is certainly no exception [...] Here, we first learn of a relationship between Mark and Gay [...] because Gay hesitated in a word association test over the word 'black'." Additionally, it questioned Straker's logic in giving an alien a truth serum before establishing that the alien can communicate with him.

Pointing out that "Computer Affair" was only the second UFO episode made, Video Watchdog commented that, special effects aside, "there is little here to engage viewers who might still be undecided about whether to continue watching the programme on a regular basis."
