= Exposed (UFO) =

1970 episode of UFO

- UFO episode
- Episode no.: Episode 2
- Directed by: David Lane
- Written by: Tony Barwick
- Editing by: Harry MacDonald
- Production code: 9
- Original air date: 21 September 1970

Guest appearances
- Jean Marsh as Janna Wade; Basil Moss as Dr Frazer; Robin Bailey as William Kofax; Paula Li Schiu as Tsi Chan; Arthur Cox as Louis Graham; Matt Zimmerman as Jim, test co-pilot; Sue Gerrard as Nurse

Episode chronology
← Previous "Identified"	Next → "Survival"

"Exposed" is the second episode aired of the first series of UFO – a 1970 British television science fiction series about an alien invasion of Earth. The screenplay was written by Tony Barwick and the director was David Lane. The episode was filmed between 13 and 23 May 1969 and first aired on 21 September 1970 in Canada, and 23 September 1970 in the UK. Though shown as the second episode, it was actually the fifth to have been filmed.

The episode introduces Colonel Paul Foster (Michael Billington), who was to become a regular character for the rest of the series.

The series was created by Gerry Anderson and Sylvia Anderson with Reg Hill, and produced by the Andersons and Lew Grade's Century 21 Productions for Grade's ITC Entertainment company.

== Plot ==
When the Sky One interceptor aircraft intercepts and destroys a UFO, the explosion causes the nearby experimental test aircraft XV-104, whose pilot refused the order to leave the area, to crash. While the co-pilot Jim is killed, the pilot Paul Foster survives, temporarily blinded.

After waking in hospital and regaining his sight, Foster claims that the cause of the aircraft crash was a UFO but his superior at his employer Ventura Aircraft and an RAF investigator, Dr. Douglas Jackson, do not believe him as evidence, showing Sky One but no UFOs, points to pilot error. Believing that a cover-up is taking place, Foster undertakes his own investigation into the events surrounding the crash. He is aided by the sister of the dead co-pilot.

Foster's investigation leads him to Commander Edward Straker. Straker agrees to meet Foster at the Harlington-Straker Studios that are used as a cover for the secret SHADO Control base located beneath. Straker is in fact testing Foster to see if he is capable of joining SHADO. Foster passes the induction and Straker reveals all about the UFO threat that Earth faces, also revealing that both Jackson and Jim's sister are actually SHADO operatives.

== Regular cast ==
- Ed Bishop as Commander Ed Straker
- George Sewell as Colonel Alec Freeman
- Michael Billington as Colonel Paul Foster
- Gabrielle Drake as Lieutenant Gay Ellis
- Wanda Ventham as Colonel Virginia Lake
- Peter Gordeno as Captain Peter Carlin
- Dolores Mantez as Lieutenant Nina Barry
- Gary Myers as Captain Lew Waterman
- Keith Alexander as Lieutenant Keith Ford
- Ayshea as Lieutenant Ayshea Johnson
- Vladek Sheybal as Dr Douglas Jackson
- Norma Ronald as Miss Ealand

== Production ==
Locations used for the filming included MGM-British Studios and Neptune House at ATV Elstree Studios, both in Borehamwood.

== Reception ==
Comparing it to "a twisted version of a mytharc X-Files story", John Kenneth Muir considered the episode "fascinating" for portraying SHADO from the point of view of an outsider, and for highlighting the organisation's flexible ethics: "Basically, the organisation organises a vast, complex conspiracy to prevent anyone from knowing the truth about what happened to Foster's co-pilot and plane [...] From an outside perspective, none of this is very nice, or even legal." He added: "In many UFO episodes, Straker makes it plain that the aliens must be destroyed at any cost [...] And yet, there is always, at the same time, a 'human cost' for these victories [...] Straker is willing to see Foster destroyed if he doesn't pass SHADO's test." Muir also noted that once accepted into SHADO, Foster willingly joins the conspiracy, arguably showing himself to be morally flawed: "In other words, Foster is not okay with the truth being hidden from him, but once he's on the inside, he's okay with the truth being hidden from others. This hypocrisy doesn't reveal him in the best light."

Review website anorakzone.com describes the episode as "functional but decent" and "watchable stuff – although, unlike the best of UFO, there's never really any sense that the story will go in an area you didn't expect".
