= Close Up (UFO) =

- UFO episode
- Episode no.: Episode 9
- Directed by: Alan Perry
- Written by: Tony Barwick
- Editing by: Harry MacDonald
- Production code: 13
- Original air date: 31 October 1970

Guest appearances
- Neil Hallett as Dr Joseph Kelly; James Beckett as Dr Young; Alan Tucker as Tracking Station Operator; Mark Hawkins as Lieutenant Gary North; Frank Mann as Launch Controller; Bob Sherman as 1st Launch Controller; Robert Howay as 2nd Launch Controller; Clive Endersby as Harry, Launch Controller; John Levene as Interceptor pilot

Episode chronology
← Previous "E.S.P."	Next → "Court Martial"

"Close Up" is the ninth episode of UFO, a 1970 British science fiction television series about an alien invasion of Earth. The screenplay was written Tony Barwick and the director was Alan Perry. The episode was filmed between 29 September to 9 October 1969 and was first broadcast on 31 October 1970 in Japan, and 16 December 1970 in the UK. It was the 13th episode filmed.

The series was created by Gerry Anderson and Sylvia Anderson with Reg Hill, and produced by the Andersons and Lew Grade's Century 21 Productions for Grade's ITC Entertainment company.

== Plot ==
SHADO place a B142 tracking probe (launched with NASA Rocket 712) equipped with a newly developed high resolution electron telescopic camera aboard in lunar orbit, during a spacewalk accomplished by Paul Foster and camera developer Lt. John Masters. A UFO is turned back by the SHADO Interceptors from Moonbase and the probe follows it back to its home world. The images the probe returns several months later have no information regarding range or magnification, however, rendering their intelligence value moot.

== Regular cast ==
- Ed Bishop as Commander Ed Straker
- George Sewell as Colonel Alec Freeman
- Michael Billington as Colonel Paul Foster
- Gabrielle Drake as Lieutenant Gay Ellis
- Dolores Mantez as Lieutenant Nina Barry
- Gary Myers as Captain Lew Waterman
- Keith Alexander as Lieutenant Keith Ford
- Ayshea as Lieutenant Ayshea Johnson
- Grant Taylor as General James Henderson

== Reception ==
TV Zone magazine considered this episode the worst of the series, commenting that the story lacks tension and the downbeat ending is "hardly worth a 50-minute wait". John Kenneth Muir called "Close Up" one of UFO's "most dated" episodes, partly because of its "sexist" portrayal of Lieutenant Gay Ellis. Muir also criticised the ending, noting that it sees Neil Hallett's character, an expert on microphotography, "lecturing to Straker about the importance of 'inner space', and understanding distance and magnification in photographs. Not only is this a seemingly basic fact treated as a cosmic revelation, but it makes all the other characters seem stupid for not realising it."

Review website anorakzone.com ranked "Close Up" the fourth-worst UFO episode, stating that the plot is "thin [...] for a 50-minute show, and the basic point is hammered home repeatedly before the final credits roll." It also criticised the "oddly spiky" and "out-of-character" interactions between Straker and Ellis, as well as Dr Kelly's demonstration of the images' uselessness, which involves "showing [Straker] a shot of Gay's 'private area', magnified several thousand times over. Straker, ever stoic, seems oddly unconcerned by two of his underlings getting together to make him look an utter fool, or the fact that Gay's crotch looks like an alien planet when seen close-up."

Noting some "amusingly awkward flirting" between Straker and Ellis, as well as the episode's "plentiful" scale model effects, Video Watchdog magazine wrote that the plot "does not amount to much, but fans of the programme's miniature hardware will be in heaven".
