= Conflict (UFO) =

1970 episode of UFO

- UFO episode
- Episode no.: Episode 4
- Directed by: Ken Turner
- Written by: Ruric Powell
- Editing by: Len Walter
- Production code: 5
- Original air date: 5 October 1970

Guest appearances
- Drewe Henley as Captain Maddox; Gerald Norman as Spacecraft pilot; Alan Tucker as Spacecraft navigator; David Courtland as Maddox's crewman; Michael Kilgarriff as Joe Steiner; Louisa Rabaiotti as SHADO Operative

Episode chronology
← Previous "Survival"	Next → "A Question of Priorities"

"Conflict" is the fourth episode aired of the first series of UFO – a 1970 British television science fiction series about an alien invasion of Earth. Ruric Powell wrote the screenplay and it was directed by Ken Turner. The episode, initially titled "Ambush", was filmed between 2 and 14 July 1969 and first aired on 5 October 1970 in Canada, and 7 October 1970 in the UK. Though shown as the fourth episode, it was actually the sixth to have been filmed.

The series was created by Gerry Anderson and Sylvia Anderson with Reg Hill, and produced by the Andersons and Lew Grade's Century 21 Productions for Grade's ITC Entertainment company.

== Plot ==
Lunar Module 32, commanded by Steve Maddox, departs from the Moon bound for Earth; its radar picks up an unidentified object shortly before re-entry. The audience sees that this is a small alien limpet-like UFO, hiding in the Apollo 8 space wreck, which attaches to the passing LM 32 and interrupts communications with the SHADO Moonbase and modifies the spaceplane's course, causing the Lunar Module to re-enter the atmosphere at too steep an angle. The limpet UFO detaches from the stricken spacecraft, which explodes shortly after, and returns to its hiding place to await another victim.

Straker is trying to convince General Henderson, head of the International Astrophysical Commission, to increase debris-eliminating space missions as he thinks that his pilots risk more in a month than Henderson's do in a year. Henderson mockingly accepts this but insists on activating the "Washington Square" protocol: the cancellation of all lunar spaceflights.

After Maddox's burial-in-space funeral at the Moonbase, Paul Foster, convinced that it was not human error that killed his friend, blasts off in a lunar module against orders and flies on the same course to prove Maddox's innocence. As with LM 32, the limpet UFO attaches itself to Foster's module and interferes with the controls, proving his theory. Foster survives by deliberately entering the atmosphere at a very shallow angle which prevents the limpet UFO from steepening his spacecraft's descent enough to destroy it before it detaches and hides. Straker issues orders to destroy all space wrecks where the UFO might be located and invites Henderson to SHADO Control, having deduced that the limpet craft was some sort of lure.

A standard UFO prepares to attack the Harlington-Straker Studios but is soon destroyed by Sky One. Henderson is convinced of the merits of Straker's request to clear all space debris and agrees to support the plan but cautions Straker that, like him, he may also have been too sure about being right.

== Regular cast ==
- Ed Bishop as Commander Ed Straker
- Michael Billington as Colonel Paul Foster
- Peter Gordeno as Captain Peter Carlin
- Gabrielle Drake as Lieutenant Gay Ellis
- Wanda Ventham as Colonel Virginia Lake
- Dolores Mantez as Lieutenant Nina Barry
- Gary Myers as Captain Lew Waterman
- Keith Alexander as Lieutenant Keith Ford
- Ayshea as Lieutenant Ayshea Johnson
- Norma Ronald as Miss Ealand
- Grant Taylor as General James L. Henderson

== Reception ==
Rating the UFO episodes from best to worst, review website anorakzone.com ranked "Conflict" 19th, calling it "better than many of the episodes ranked above it" but "[not] as much fun". It considered the episode an example of how, "by concerning itself with the minutiae of bureaucracy", UFO showed itself to be "more adult" than other science fiction series.

John Kenneth Muir regarded the episode as one of the best, describing it as "fascinating" for "[realising that] the real impediment here is not the actual nemesis of Earth (the alien device), but our own human politics". Muir also considered the episode "extremely forward-looking" for the 1970s due to its focus on the emerging problem of space junk.

Except for the climax and the scale model special effects, Video Watchdog magazine found the episode "unremarkable and largely uninvolving".
