= Flight Path (UFO) =

1971 episode of UFO

- UFO episode
- Episode no.: Episode 15
- Directed by: Ken Turner
- Written by: Ian Scott Stewart
- Editing by: Len Walter
- Production code: 3
- Original air date: 21 December 1970

Guest appearances
- George Cole as Paul Roper; Maxwell Shaw as Dr Shroeder; Sonia Fox as Carol Roper; Keith Grenville as Dawson, medic; David Daker as SHADO guard

Episode chronology
← Previous "The Dalotek Affair"	Next → "Computer Affair"

"Flight Path" is the fifteenth episode aired of the first series of UFO – a 1970 British television science fiction series about an alien invasion of Earth. The screenplay, originally entitled "The Sun Always Rises", was written by Ian Scott Stewart and the director was Ken Turner. The episode was filmed between 26 May to 5 June 1969 and was first broadcast on 21 December 1970 in Canada, and 20 January 1971 in the UK. Though shown as the fifteenth episode, it was actually the third to have been filmed.

The series was created by Gerry Anderson and Sylvia Anderson with Reg Hill, and produced by the Andersons and Lew Grade's Century 21 Productions for Grade's ITC Entertainment company.

== Plot ==
Carol, the wife of Paul Roper, a Moonbase operative, is being threatened by Dawson, a SHADO medical operative under alien control. Roper is blackmailed into feeding false information into SID – the satellite that tracks incoming UFOs. The information being sent to SID will allow a UFO to attack Moonbase using heavy sunspot activity as cover. However, SID reports that some of Roper's data is incorrect – either accidentally or deliberately.

Carol is attacked by Dawson, and both are killed. Roper, to defend Moonbase travels out onto the lunar surface with a rocket launcher. He manages to destroy the incoming UFO but the resulting explosion punctures his space suit and he dies from oxygen starvation.

== Regular cast ==
- Ed Bishop as Commander Ed Straker
- George Sewell as Colonel Alec Freeman
- Gabrielle Drake as Lieutenant Gay Ellis
- Peter Gordeno as Captain Peter Carlin
- Dolores Mantez as Lieutenant Nina Barry
- Antonia Ellis as Lieutenant Joan Harrington
- Ayshea as Lieutenant Ayshea Johnson

== Reception ==
Review website anorakzone.com ranked "Flight Path" the fifth-best episode of UFO, noting Cole's prominent guest role and its "downbeat", "chilling" conclusion. On the latter point, the review added: "While there are better episodes of UFO, this is what it specialised in more than the camp and the action sequences: human tragedy and offbeat resolutions."

John Kenneth Muir called it "adequate", praising the UFO effects but commenting that "despite the personal stakes involved, the episode never seems anything other than straightforward." He added that it lacks the "emotional wallop of 'Confetti Check A-O.K.', 'A Question of Priorities' or 'The Square Triangle'", and fails to rival "great high-concept action masterpieces" like "Mindbender" or "Timelash".

Video Watchdog magazine found the episode "ultimately worthwhile" with a strong climax, even if the script features "some serious lapses in logic".
