= A Question of Priorities =

- UFO episode
- Episode no.: Episode 5
- Directed by: David Lane
- Written by: Tony Barwick
- Editing by: Harry MacDonald
- Production code: 7
- Original air date: 14 October 1970

Guest appearances
- Philip Madoc as Steven Rutland; Suzanne Neve as Mary Rutland; Mary Merrall as Mrs O'Connor; Barnaby Shaw as John Rutland; Peter Halliday as Dr Segal; Russell Napier as Dr Green; Richard Aylen as Alien; Andrea Allan as Nurse; David Cargill as Car driver; Penny Spencer as SHADO operative

Episode chronology
← Previous "Conflict"	Next → "The Square Triangle"

"A Question of Priorities" is the fifth episode aired of the first series of UFO – a 1970 British television science fiction series about an alien invasion of Earth. Tony Barwick wrote the screenplay and it was directed by David Lane. The episode was filmed between 28 July and 7 August 1969 and was first broadcast on 14 October 1970 on Associated Television. Though shown as the fifth episode, it was actually the eighth to have been filmed.

The series was created by Gerry Anderson and Sylvia Anderson with Reg Hill, and produced by the Andersons and Lew Grade's Century 21 Productions for Grade's ITC Entertainment company.

== Plot ==
Commander Ed Straker's son Johnny is hit by a car and taken to hospital. Straker arrives at the hospital with his ex-wife, Mary, to find that Johnny is allergic to the antibiotics the hospital has available – Straker uses his position to order an experimental anti-allergenic antibiotic to be flown from New York to Britain by a SHADO transport.

In Ireland, an alien escapes from a crashing UFO and starts transmitting from the home of an elderly blind woman. The transmissions are intercepted by SHADO HQ and Colonel Alec Freeman diverts the transport aircraft, unaware that it is carrying the antibiotics, to investigate the signals.

When Straker discovers this change of schedule he knows that he cannot order the transport to Britain as his duty to SHADO overrides any personal needs. But Mary challenges Straker when he tells her the transport is being delayed because of "a more important matter".

SHADO mobiles carried by the transport are sent to investigate the alien transmissions but before the mobiles can make contact, another UFO arrives and kills the alien: it appears that he was trying to defect. The transport then continues on to Britain and Straker rushes to the hospital with the antibiotics but it proves too late as his son has died, with a tearful Mary saying that she never wants to see her ex-husband again.

== Regular cast ==
- Ed Bishop as Commander Ed Straker
- George Sewell as Colonel Alec Freeman
- Gabrielle Drake as Lieutenant Gay Ellis
- Peter Gordeno as Captain Peter Carlin
- Dolores Mantez as Lieutenant Nina Barry
- Gary Myers as Captain Lew Waterman
- Keith Alexander as Lieutenant Keith Ford
- Ayshea as Lieutenant Ayshea Johnson
- Norma Ronald as Miss Ealand

== Reception ==
"A Question of Priorities" has been well received by critics. TV Zone magazine considered it the best episode of UFO, describing it as a "perfect fusion of science fiction action and human drama" while praising Ed Bishop's "understated" acting. The review pointed out that Straker's strained relationship with his son and ex-wife is further explored in "Sub-Smash", "Confetti Check A-O.K." and "Mindbender".

Video Watchdog magazine noted the "superior" script and praised Bishop's performance, adding that the episode is "rightly regarded as one of the series' finest." Review website The Anorak Zone ranked the episode second only to "Timelash", highlighting the story's "emotional rawness". The website commented that despite a number of "moderately corny and misjudged sequences, [...] the tangible pain at the climax, and the concept of the series becoming this dark, is a punch to the gut that's impossible to forget."

For John Kenneth Muir, the episode "must rank near the top" of UFO stories. He called it "very much a case of the series' potential fully realised" through its "haunting, devastating portrait of Ed Straker [...]" He added that the episode "succeeds as well as it does" because despite its high stakes, it avoids melodrama, instead providing a "dispassionate, uncompromising view of a leader forced to make an impossible decision."
