= Destruction (UFO) =

- UFO episode
- Episode no.: Episode 20
- Directed by: Ken Turner
- Written by: Dennis Spooner
- Editing by: Len Walter
- Production code: 20
- Original air date: 2 December 1970

Guest appearances
- Stephanie Beacham as Sarah Bonsanquet; Edwin Richfield as Admiral Sheringham; Philip Madoc as Captain Steven; Peter Blythe as Second Officer Cooper; Steven Berkoff as Captain Steve Minto; David Warbeck as Sky Diver Captain; Barry Stokes as Sky Diver engineer; Jimmy Winston as Rating; Michael Ferrand as Radar technician; Robert Lloyd as Radar officer

Episode chronology
← Previous "The Sound of Silence"	Next → "The Man Who Came Back"

"Destruction" is the 20th episode of UFO, a 1970 British science fiction television series about an alien invasion of Earth. The screenplay was written by Dennis Spooner and the director was Ken Turner. The episode was filmed between 4 and 16 June 1970 and was first broadcast on 2 December 1970 on Associated Television.

The series was created by Gerry Anderson and Sylvia Anderson with Reg Hill, and produced by the Andersons and Lew Grade's Century 21 Productions for Grade's ITC Entertainment company.

== Plot ==
A Royal Navy destroyer in the Atlantic Ocean shoots down a UFO. Straker wants to know why the UFO was interested in the ship and how it managed to evade SHADO's detection. The UFO's wreckage is too deep for Skydiver One to retrieve and a Royal Navy admiral, Sheringham, refuses to divulge any information on the incident or the ship's mission.

Straker decides to see if he can get information out of the Admiral's secretary, astronomer Sarah Bonsanquet (the daughter of one of the astronauts who disappeared while building the SHADO Moonbase). He has Foster establish a relationship with Sarah and, while they are on a date with Sarah, Straker and Colonel Virginia Lake break into and search her apartment. There they discover a refracting telescope with a transmitter powerful enough to reach the aliens – she has been passing information to them.

Straker learns that the ship was going to dump nerve gas into the sea but the aliens see an opportunity to release it into the atmosphere to kill the Earth's human population. Three UFOs are then detected heading for the ship, proving that the aliens have managed to circumvent SHADO's detection systems. Moon-based SHADO Interceptors destroy one UFO but another attacks the ship, which is later saved when Skydiver One arrives and Sky One destroys the UFO.

== Regular cast ==
- Ed Bishop as Commander Ed Straker
- Michael Billington as Colonel Paul Foster
- Wanda Ventham as Colonel Virginia Lake
- Dolores Mantez as Lieutenant Nina Barry
- Ayshea as Lieutenant Ayshea Johnson
- Grant Taylor as General James Henderson

== Production ==
Filming locations included Neptune House, ATV Elstree Studios, Borehamwood; Burnham Beeches in Buckinghamshire; and Horse Guards Parade, Admiralty House and Trafalgar Square in London.

== Reception ==
John Kenneth Muir calls the episode "a crushing disappointment [...] really pedestrian, poorly conceived and poorly executed". He questions why the aliens seek to destroy humanity, given their need to harvest its organs, and criticises the character development, writing of Foster and Bosanquet: "We're back in sexist-ville here, with Straker basically ordering Foster to romance a young woman, Sarah, to get information from her boss." Muir also notes the lack of "punishment" and "redemption" for Beacham's traitorous character. He adds that "Destruction" is perhaps the "dullest" episode of the series, remarking that the UFO assault on the navy vessel "goes on and on, seemingly endlessly, with not a single member of the primary cast involved in the events to make it meaningful or vital."

Review website anorakzone.com calls the episode "reasonably layered" and compares the story to detective fiction. It describes "Destruction" as "the most engaging of the 'procedural' episodes of UFO, where the script isn't so concerned with overt action, but instead boardroom politics, diplomatic negotiations and red tape".
