= Ordeal (UFO) =

1971 episode of UFO

- UFO episode
- Episode no.: Episode 7
- Directed by: Ken Turner
- Written by: Tony Barwick
- Editing by: Len Walter
- Production code: 8
- Original air date: 26 October 1970

Guest appearances
- Basil Moss as Dr Frazer; Quinn O'Hara as Sylvia Graham; Jeremy Wilkin as Lieutenant Maxwell; David Healy as Joe Franklin; Joseph Morris as Medic; Peter Burton as Perry; Mark Hawkins as Lieutenant Gary North

Episode chronology
← Previous "The Square Triangle"	Next → "E.S.P."

"Ordeal" is the seventh episode of UFO, a 1970 British science fiction television series about an alien invasion of Earth. The screenplay was written by Tony Barwick and the director was Ken Turner. The episode was filmed from 8 to 20 August 1969, and was first broadcast on 26 October 1970 in Canada, and 20 January 1971 in the UK. It was the ninth episode filmed.

The series was created by Gerry Anderson and Sylvia Anderson with Reg Hill, and produced by the Andersons and Lew Grade's Century 21 Productions for Grade's ITC Entertainment company.

== Plot ==
Colonel Foster gets drunk at a party the night before a scheduled fitness check at a SHADO-run health farm (featured in this sequence on the soundtrack is The Beatles' single "Get Back"). He passes out in a sauna at the farm, and awakens just as aliens are kidnapping him. The aliens put Foster in a UFO and take off. Foster's friend and colleague, Captain Waterman in command of Skydiver, is ordered to destroy the UFO carrying Foster. However, Waterman, flying Sky One, cannot bring himself to do so: instead he uses Sky One to disable it, forcing a crash-landing on the Moon, where Foster is rescued by Moonbase operatives.

Inside Moonbase, they find that Foster has been put in a spacesuit and made to breathe the liquid that the aliens must breathe in order to survive the journey from their home planet. When his helmet is removed, he struggles to re-adapt to breathing air. He then awakens properly back inside the sauna, realising that he was simply imagining the abduction while all along he was safely on Earth.

The episode ends with Foster singing a rendition of "Beautiful Dreamer".

== Regular cast ==
- Ed Bishop as Commander Ed Straker
- George Sewell as Colonel Alec Freeman
- Michael Billington as Colonel Paul Foster
- Gabrielle Drake as Lieutenant Gay Ellis
- Vladek Sheybal as Dr Douglas Jackson
- Dolores Mantez as Lieutenant Nina Barry
- Gary Myers as Captain Lew Waterman
- Keith Alexander as Lieutenant Keith Ford
- Ayshea as Lieutenant Ayshea Johnson

== Reception ==
According to John Kenneth Muir, who interpreted the plot as a "cautionary tale about excess", the episode is often thought of as the worst of UFO due to its "underwhelming" final plot twist. He questioned why the SHADO scenes are played straight despite being part of Foster's nightmare, arguing that because of this, the story "doesn't quite hold together". However, he considered the overall episode to be "well filmed" and "visually dynamic", as well as a "nice showcase for Michael Billington".

Infinity magazine placed "Ordeal" among several "duff" episodes of UFO, describing the story as "just an elongated dream sequence". Review website Entertainment Focus called it "daft and poorly written", also commenting that the nightmare itself "makes bewilderingly little sense" as it includes scenes in which Foster, the one having the nightmare, does not appear. Justin Richards argued that despite the episode's negative reputation, the twist ending "does not detract from the 'dream' story", which he found to be well integrated with the real-world plot through "almost subliminal images".

Believing it to be one of the series' "more dated" episodes, Video Watchdog magazine describes "Ordeal" as a "dull and thoroughly predictable outing; we are never even given a good look inside the aliens' craft, let alone a clearer idea of their motives, and the medical procedure is disappointingly simplistic." Review website The Anorak Zone ranks "Ordeal" the second-worst episode of the series, calling it "more just inessential than anything else" and "a time filler".
