= The Square Triangle =

- UFO episode
- Episode no.: Episode 6
- Directed by: David Lane
- Written by: Alan Pattillo
- Editing by: Harry MacDonald
- Production code: 11
- Original air date: 19 October 1970

Guest appearances
- Adrienne Corri as Liz Newton; Patrick Mower as Cass Fowler; Allan Cuthbertson as Jack Newton; Anthony Chinn as Alien; Godfrey James as Mitchell, game warden; Hugo Panczak as SHADO Mobile navigator

Episode chronology
← Previous "A Question of Priorities"	Next → "Ordeal"

"The Square Triangle" is the sixth episode of UFO, a 1970 British science fiction television series about an alien invasion of Earth. The screenplay was written by Alan Pattillo and the director was David Lane. The episode was filmed between 3 and 15 September 1969 and was first broadcast on 19 October 1970 in Canada, and 11 November 1970 in the UK. It was the 11th episode filmed.

The series was created by Gerry Anderson and Sylvia Anderson with Reg Hill, and produced by the Andersons and Lew Grade's Century 21 Productions for Grade's ITC Entertainment company.

== Plot ==
Straker allows a UFO to land in Southern England in an attempt to capture the craft, and its alien crew, by sending out a fleet of SHADO mobiles. After the UFO lands safely, a lone alien survivor has a fight with a game warden and his dog, causing the alien's uniform to rip and his helmet to shatter. The alien kills the human with a machine gun-style weapon, drags the corpse to the UFO, and then self-destructs the craft in an attempt to get away by substituting the human with himself. Colonel Foster and his crew identify the charred corpse as the human and not the alien; moreover, they find a piece of the alien's uniform and use the surviving canine to track his location within the surrounding woodlands. Meantime, in a cottage close to the landing site, Liz Newton is conspiring with her lover Cass Fowler to murder Liz's husband, Jack. Liz plans to shoot Jack upon his arrival at home and then claim that she thought him to be an intruder. To that end Cass coaches her in the details of her alibi and it is made clear that he is the driving force in the plan. However, their scheme is foiled when the alien suddenly appears at the front door and is shot instead.

Foster and his investigation team arrive with the dog to find the dead alien, from which the conniving pair are taken to SHADO headquarters, where they are debriefed of the events, and eventually given an amnesia drug to make them forget everything that had occurred within the previous twelve hours.

Meanwhile Foster continues the investigation at the cottage. When Jack returns, Foster questions him to deduce the couple's murderous plan. At SHADO, Foster explains a theory that the pair originally planned to kill the husband and if released, there was no stopping them from doing it again. Straker points out that they cannot provide the body of an alien or turn over the pair to the authorities because SHADO is not in the "moralising business", from which Straker orders Foster to get everything possible about the destroyed UFO, and Colonel Freeman to check on the autopsy of the alien. The pair are released. The final shot shows Liz in the near future looking at a non-identifying gravestone during the end credits with a far shot of an approaching male that appears to be Cass.

== Regular cast ==
- Ed Bishop as Commander Ed Straker
- George Sewell as Colonel Alec Freeman
- Michael Billington as Colonel Paul Foster
- Gabrielle Drake as Lieutenant Gay Ellis
- Dolores Mantez as Lieutenant Nina Barry
- Gary Myers as Captain Lew Waterman
- Keith Alexander as Lieutenant Keith Ford
- Ayshea as Lieutenant Ayshea Johnson
- Norma Ronald as Miss Ealand

== Production ==
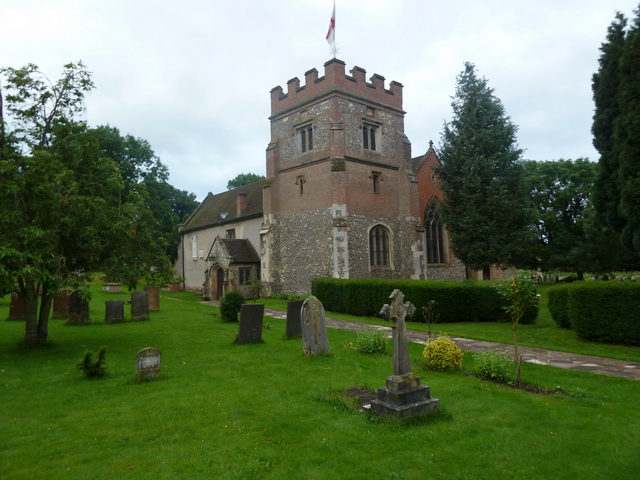
The final scene was filmed in Harefield, on the path leading to the entrance of St Mary's Church.

Filming locations included Black Park and Black Park Cottage in Iver Heath, Buckinghamshire. The closing graveyard scene was shot outside the Church of St Mary the Virgin in Harefield, London Borough of Hillingdon.

== Reception ==
Review website anorakzone.com ranked "The Square Triangle" the third-best episode of UFO, calling it "a fine example of a relatively mundane episode being lifted into something far greater by a classic ending".

Describing it as "one of the most brilliant and successful" instalments, John Kenneth Muir praised the episode for its themes of sacrifice and "hypocrisy" in war ("Here, an innocent man must be allowed to die for the secrecy of [SHADO's] cause.") Muir also commented on the cinematography of the graveyard scene, noting that the camera zooms out to indicate "a kind of withdrawal, in shame and horror, at what has occurred".

Video Watchdog magazine commented that "[w]hat seems like a tired and uninspiring episode is salvaged somewhat by David Lane's direction and an effective final act twist [...] that re-emphasises the sometimes callous methods SHADO must utilise to maintain its secrecy."
