= The Dalotek Affair =

1971 episode of UFO

- UFO episode
- Episode no.: Episode 14
- Directed by: Alan Perry
- Written by: Ruric Powell
- Editing by: Alan Killick
- Production code: 6
- Original air date: 14 December 1970

Guest appearances
- Tracy Reed as Jane Carson; Dr Frank Stranges as Himself; Basil Moss as Dr Frazer; Clinton Greyn as Mark Tanner; David Weston as Phil Mitchell; Philip Latham as Blake; John Breslin as Dr Charles Reed; Alan Tucker as Lunar Module Pilot; John Cobner as Moonmobile Captain; Richard Poore as Moonmobile Lieutenant

Episode chronology
← Previous "Sub-Smash"	Next → "Flight Path"

"The Dalotek Affair" is the 14th episode aired of the first series of UFO – a 1970 British television science fiction series about an alien invasion of Earth. The screenplay was written by Ruric Powell and the director was Alan Perry. The episode was filmed between 15 to 25 July 1969 and was first broadcast on 14 December 1970 in Canada, and 10 February 1971 in the UK. It was the seventh episode to be filmed.

The series was created by Gerry Anderson and Sylvia Anderson with Reg Hill, and produced by the Andersons and Lew Grade's Century 21 Productions for Grade's ITC Entertainment company.

== Plot ==
The episode is almost entirely a flashback that Colonel Foster has as he sees a woman while dining with Colonel Alec Freeman:

Unexplained communication blackouts are affecting the SHADO Moonbase. Foster believes that the nearby Dalotek Corporation lunar base may be causing the issues through use of their geological scanner. During another blackout a Lunar module crashes when trying to land, killing the crew on board.

Foster investigates Dalotek and disables a piece of their equipment thought to be the cause. However, this does not stop the blackouts. The Dalotek team discovers an alien jamming device, placed by the aliens in a lunar crater using a meteor that crashed on the Moon (a fact that Commander Straker realises while watching a TV interview with Dr Frank Stranges). Foster sends out a team to destroy the jamming device before an incoming alien UFO attacks Moonbase. With the device destroyed, the UFO can be targeted and also destroyed.

The epilogue reveals that the woman was Jane Carson, the Dalotek employee Foster was flirting with, who had her memory wiped due to SHADO security protocol.

== Regular cast ==
- Ed Bishop as Commander Ed Straker
- Michael Billington as Colonel Paul Foster
- George Sewell as Colonel Alec Freeman
- Dolores Mantez as Lieutenant Nina Barry
- Keith Alexander as Lieutenant Keith Ford
- Ayshea as Lieutenant Ayshea Johnson

== Reception ==
Review website The Anorak Zone considered "The Dalotek Affair" to be the worst episode of UFO, writing that it shows the series "at its most tacky and inane" and the cast "at their least charming". The website was critical of Foster's depiction, arguing that his use of SHADO's amnesia agent "as a kind of reverse rohypnol" to make advances on Carson is "an inexplicably amoral piece of characterisation".

Justin Richards argued that if the audience recalls Foster's break-up with his girlfriend in the earlier episode "Survival", his flirtatious behaviour in "The Dalotek Affair" may be viewed more sympathetically. Richards considered this an example of how UFO "demanded a certain effort from its audience to understand it", its scripts tending to be written on "a level higher than the audience expected or realised."

Commenting that the episode seems "woefully dated" by Foster's passes at Carson, John Kenneth Muir called the episode "stylishly rendered" even if the plot about the alien's jammer is dull. Video Watchdog magazine wrote that it "might have been a fairly effective episode, but the flashback gimmick is not effectively utilised."
