= The Long Sleep (UFO) =

- UFO episode
- Episode no.: Episode 25
- Directed by: Jeremy Summers
- Written by: David Tomblin
- Cinematography by: Brendan J. Stafford
- Editing by: Lee Doig
- Production code: 26
- Original air date: 13 March 1971

Cast
- Ed Bishop as Colonel Straker; Michael Billington as Colonel Foster; Wanda Ventham as Colonel Lake; Vladek Sheybal as Dr Jackson; Anouska Hempel as Lieutenant Scott; Tessa Wyatt as Catherine Fraser; Christian Roberts as Tim Redman; Christopher Robbie as a SHADO bomb disposal expert; John Garrie as the van driver

Episode chronology
← Previous "Reflections in the Water"	Next → "Timelash"

"The Long Sleep" is the 25th episode of UFO, a British science fiction television series made by Century 21 Productions for ITC Entertainment. The 26th and final episode to be produced, it was written by David Tomblin and filmed in September 1970 at Pinewood Studios and various locations around London and Buckinghamshire. It was directed by Jeremy Summers.

Set in the 1980s, UFO depicts the efforts of a secret organisation, Supreme Headquarters Alien Defence Organisation (SHADO), to thwart an alien invasion of Earth. In "The Long Sleep", a SHADO operation to locate and neutralise an alien time bomb depends on a hospital patient's flashbacks to a traumatic encounter with the aliens a decade earlier.

"The Long Sleep" first aired in Canada on 13 March 1971, and in the UK on 1 April 1971. The episode has received mainly positive reviews from critics. It has also drawn comment for its depictions of drug abuse and sexual assault, which proved controversial to ITV network broadcasters and led to the episode being postponed or restricted to late-night timeslots in some UK regions.

== Plot ==
SHADO learns that Catherine Fraser, a young woman Commander Straker accidentally ran down with his car in 1970, has woken up after 10 years in a coma. Before losing consciousness, Catherine was muttering about a UFO, and her SHADO file remains open. Straker travels to Harville Hospital, where Catherine is being treated by SHADO's Dr Jackson, and urges Catherine to recall as much as she can about events leading up the accident.

Unhappy with her life, Catherine had run away to London. There she met Tim, a medical school drop-out who was busking in the street. They hitch-hiked to the countryside, rested in an abandoned farmhouse, and shared Tim's psychedelic pills. While tripping, they entered the cellar and found a pair of "spacemen" (the aliens) burying a cylinder in the ground. Not realising the danger they were in, they playfully stole a piece of the cylinder and ran up to the loft with the aliens in pursuit. In his uninhibited state, Tim threw himself off the roof to his death, while Catherine, who had hidden the component, was knocked out by the aliens. After regaining consciousness, she saw the aliens drag Tim's body away and take off in their spacecraft. Lost, she flagged down a passing driver, who attempted to molest her in his van. While fleeing from her attacker, she ran into a road and was hit by Straker, who had no time to stop.

This happened days after a massive earthquake struck Turkey, killing many thousands. There had been reports of UFOs over Turkey shortly before. Straker suspects Catherine's aliens were arming a bomb and the part she took was the detonator. Although the bomb never went off, SHADO must dismantle it; if it explodes, much of Britain will be destroyed. Colonels Lake and Foster dispatch teams to locate the farmhouse, but the search area is vast, and with Catherine unable to approximate its position, the operation could take weeks.

A nurse has been eavesdropping on Catherine and Straker. It is Tim, who privately reveals himself to Catherine. The aliens resuscitated him and sent him back to complete their mission. Injecting her with an anti-amnesic, he forces her to remember what she did with the detonator: after fleeing the farmhouse, she threw it into a houseboat on a canal.

By the time Straker and Jackson return, Tim has gone, leaving behind a second dose of anti-amnesic. Jackson administers it and Straker questions Catherine about the farmhouse. Her answers enable SHADO to pinpoint its position and Straker and Foster go after Tim – who has already retrieved the detonator from the houseboat, murdering the owner in the process. Tim is caught just after he finishes arming the bomb. He collapses and dies, leaving only his skeleton.

The bomb contains liquid explosives which are combining to cause a chemical reaction. Discovering that the process requires exposure to sunlight, Straker and Foster put a cover on the bomb, halting the reaction and giving SHADO time to send in a robotic space disposal capsule. The capsule lifts off carrying the bomb, which explodes harmlessly in space.

Straker returns to the hospital to find that Catherine rapidly aged to death around time Tim died. Jackson speculates that after knocking her out, the aliens extracted her remaining years to revive Tim. Visibly shaken, Straker leaves the hospital.

== Production ==
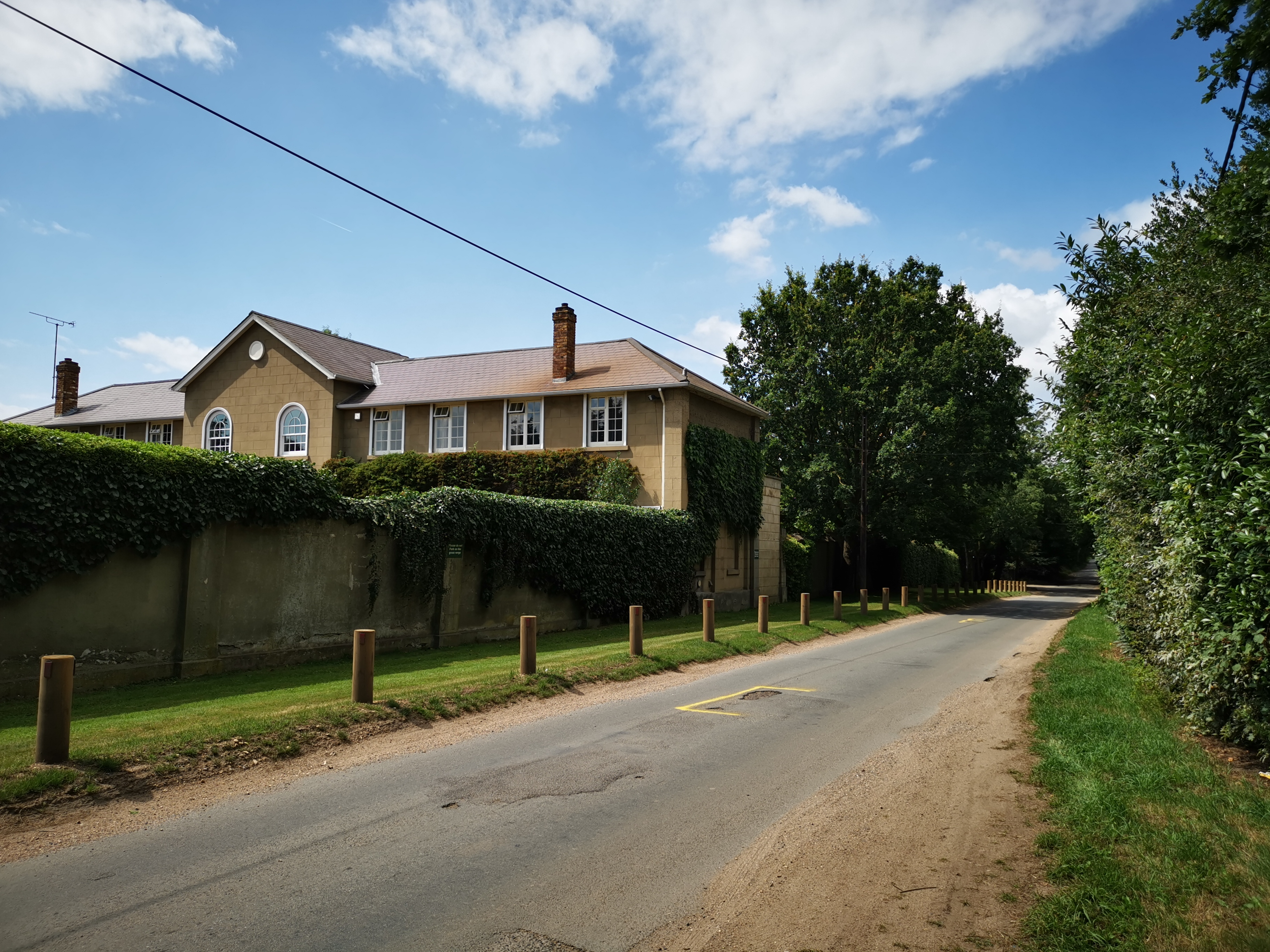
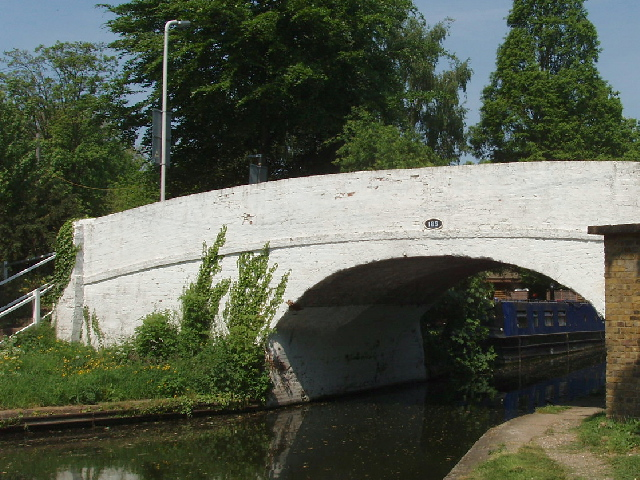
Shooting locations included the farmhouse at Dromenagh Farm, Iver (top) and Benbow Waye Bridge over the Grand Union Canal in Cowley, London.

"The Long Sleep" was written in autumn 1970. Tomblin's script was heavily revised prior to filming. As originally written, more of the flashback scenes were to be from Straker's (Ed Bishop) perspective, showing him investigating the farmhouse following reports of alien activity. They were also to include a sequence set on the London Underground and had Catherine being knocked down by a bus, not Straker's car. It was intended for there to be more action sequences involving Straker. However, these had to be reduced because Bishop was still recovering from an injury he had sustained during the filming of "Timelash".

In amendments dated August 1970, Tomblin replaced two guest characters – a hospital doctor and security guard – with series regulars Dr Jackson (Vladek Sheybal) and Colonel Lake (Wanda Ventham). He also changed the name of Catherine's companion from Tom to Tim, and Catherine's surname from Ross to Fraser. In the finished episode, Catherine is still called "Miss Ross" in one scene.

The episode was filmed at Pinewood Studios and on location in early September 1970. Its location shoot – the largest of the series – included various sites in Central London, the Grand Union Canal in Cowley, a farmhouse in Iver, and the exteriors of Wexham Park Hospital and Heatherden Hall as the fictional Harville Hospital. Scenes showing the hospital entrance were filmed in one of the Pinewood administration blocks. Principal photography concluded on 11 September 1970.

The shots of the UFO landing were stock model footage originally filmed for "The Psychobombs". During post-production, the flashback scenes were given a sepia treatment; for the psychedelic trip sequence, this was supplemented by various colour filters. Incidental music for the flashbacks was recorded on 9 November 1970.

== Broadcast ==
"The Long Sleep" premiered in Canada, originally airing on the CTV Television Network on 13 March 1971. It was shown in Japan two weeks later. In the UK, it was first broadcast on 1 April 1971 by Anglia Television. Some ITV franchises omitted the episode from their first runs of UFO. Other franchises, including Anglia, put the episode in a late-evening, low-audience timeslot, outside the primetime slot they reserved for other UFO episodes. Associated Television held the episode back until 1973, then aired it after 11.30 pm. Yorkshire Television postponed it until 1974, and London Weekend until 1975.

Various sources attribute these delays to broadcasters' concerns about the scenes of drug abuse and their suitability for family viewing. According to John R. Cook, the episode's scheduling shows how difficult it was for 1970s programme-makers to challenge the idea that science fiction is primarily a children's genre. He wrote: "The desire to produce a science fiction series that would also have appeal to adults [...] had, in the case of this particular episode, the effect of simply exiling UFO to a graveyard slot far away from the important youth audience."

Executive producer Gerry Anderson later said that he thought these scenes were "too adult" for a general audience, and regretted that he did not demand a rewrite. According to Justin Richards, broadcasters may have found the scene of sexual assault equally objectionable, and this could explain the episode's troubled scheduling. Referring to "The Long Sleep" as the series' "controversial drug-taking" episode, Fiona Moore argued that the story is "genuinely adult, rather than simply appending a bit of sex and violence onto a childrens' series plot".

== Reception ==
Paul Cornell, Martin Day and Keith Topping regard "The Long Sleep" as UFO's most controversial episode, noting its "hallucinatory dream sequences, plethora of drug speak, and implied rape". Along with three other episodes that were originally restricted to late-night slots in the UK ("The Responsibility Seat", "Mindbender" and "Timelash"), they believe that the episode "made the series' reputation."

The episode has received largely positive reviews. John Kenneth Muir considered the episode one of the series' best, calling it "emotionally moving, stylishly filmed, and mind-blowing [...] It's a weird but wholly inventive hour [...] 'The Long Sleep' really gets it right, and I must note for the record that [... this] is a story not about technology, but about people and relationships." Muir especially praised the episode's "haunting" final shot of Straker walking down a garden path away from the hospital. He perceived themes of lost hope or freedom, writing that Catherine's story shows "how youthful idealism gets drained away [...] by a corrupt but powerful establishment or system".

Review website The Anorak Zone rated "The Long Sleep" the seventh-best episode of UFO, calling it "bleak" and "brilliant". However, the website argued that the story is marred slightly by a number of plot holes (such as the houseboat not having moved in a decade), as well as some incongruous characterisation and incidental music (such as a bomb disposal expert's dark humour and the "jazz bongo riff" accompanying the sex attack on Catherine).

Noting that the episode depicts two types of drugs – the psychedelics Catherine took willingly, and the pharmaceuticals forced on her in hospital – Muir pointed out that while the first liberated Catherine, the second, ironically, hastened her death. He also interpreted the episode as a commentary on the rise and fall of the hippie movement, writing that the Catherine and Tim's misfortunes "somehow speak to the idea of an epoch – the hippie counterculture – living on borrowed time, as the mainstream culture also leeches life away from it." According to Ian Fryer, the plot "takes the 1960s hippie subculture head on in a far more intelligent manner than had some other [science fiction] series of the era."

Samira Ahmed considered the episode "beautifully shot" and "perhaps the best template" for a potential UFO remake, "revisiting the anxieties of the present – hippies, drugs, terrorist bomb attacks and mass disasters – through an unsolved cold case".

Sci-Fi Universe magazine commented negatively on the episode as a series finale. It argued that while the episode gives "another unique perspective on the aliens' use of human subjects", it "answers none of the pressing questions" about the aliens themselves, or their motives for attacking Earth.
