= E.S.P. (UFO) =

- UFO episode
- Episode no.: Episode 8
- Directed by: Ken Turner
- Written by: Alan Fennell
- Editing by: Lee Doig
- Production code: 15
- Original air date: 7 October 1970

Guest appearances
- John Stratton as John Croxley; Douglas Wilmer as Dr Brünner; Deborah Stanford as Stella Croxley; Maxwell Shaw as Dr Shroeder; Stanley McGeagh as SHADO guard; Donald Tandy as Gate security

Episode chronology
← Previous "Ordeal"	Next → "Close Up"

"E.S.P." is the eighth episode of UFO, a 1970 British science fiction television series about an alien invasion of Earth. Alan Fennell wrote the screenplay and it was directed by Ken Turner. The episode was filmed between 23 October and 4 November 1969 and was first broadcast on 7 October 1970 on Tyne Tees Television. It was the 15th episode filmed.

The series was created by Gerry Anderson and Sylvia Anderson with Reg Hill, and produced by the Andersons and Lew Grade's Century 21 Productions for Grade's ITC Entertainment company.

== Plot ==
Returning home after seeing his psychiatrist, John Croxley, a man with very powerful ESP, is stopped by SHADO personnel due to an incoming UFO. The UFO crashes into Croxley's house, killing his wife and injuring Col. Foster who was monitoring the UFO from a SHADO mobile.

Foster is taken to hospital and SHADO sends a team to investigate the crash site. Croxley, now under alien influence, is able to read the minds of the SHADO team and learns all about SHADO's operations. Croxley believes that Straker and Freeman caused his wife's death and sets out to kill them.

Foster believes that someone or something is watching him – a response to his mind being read by Croxley. Croxley sends Straker what looks like a film script but is instead a full, detailed description of SHADO's organisation and its operations, including places and times. After visiting Croxley's psychiatrist, Straker and Freeman learn of Croxley's ESP ability and are told to meet Croxley at his ruined house where Croxley, still under alien influence, intends to kill them both.

Foster, who has been told that revisiting the site of his injuries will help his recuperation, also arrives at the house. Although Croxley's ability allows him to be aware of Foster's presence, he does not stop Foster, who shoots Croxley just as he is about to kill Straker and Freeman.

== Regular cast ==
- Ed Bishop as Commander Ed Straker
- George Sewell as Colonel Alec Freeman
- Gabrielle Drake as Lieutenant Gay Ellis
- Dolores Mantez as Lieutenant Nina Barry
- Keith Alexander as Lieutenant Keith Ford
- Norma Ronald as Miss Ealand
- Harry Baird as Lieutenant Mark Bradley

== Production ==
The episode was filmed at MGM-British Studios, as well as on location at Neptune House (part of ATV Elstree Studios) and a factory in Slough.

== Reception ==
Review website anorakzone.com ranks the episode the third-worst of the series, adding that "it's arguably the cheapest-looking episode of UFO, and does strain credulity." The review also criticises the ending's "corny expositionary dialogue". John Kenneth Muir comments that "there is nothing in particular wrong with 'E.S.P.'; yet it is never terribly original, or even thought-provoking."
