= Sub-Smash =

- UFO episode
- Episode no.: Episode 13
- Directed by: David Lane
- Written by: Alan Fennell
- Editing by: Harry MacDonald
- Production code: 17
- Original air date: 11 November 1970

Guest appearances
- Paul Maxwell as Lieutenant Jim Lewis; Anthony Chinn as Lieutenant Tony Chin; John Golightly as Holden; Burnell Tucker as Turner, Albatross pilot; Alan Haywood as Ross, SHADO diver; Suzanne Neve as Straker's ex-wife; Barnaby Shaw as Straker's son

Episode chronology
← Previous "Kill Straker!"	Next → "The Dalotek Affair"

"Sub-Smash" is the 13th episode of UFO, a 1970 British science fiction television series about an alien invasion of Earth. The screenplay was written Alan Fennell and the director was David Lane. The episode was filmed between 18 and 28 November 1969 and was first broadcast on 11 November 1970 on Associated Television. It was the 17th episode filmed.

The series was created by Gerry Anderson and Sylvia Anderson with Reg Hill, and produced by the Andersons and Lew Grade's Century 21 Productions for Grade's ITC Entertainment company.

== Plot ==
When a freighter is sunk mid-Atlantic by an undersea UFO, Straker joins the crew on Skydiver to investigate despite his claustrophobia. As they search in the area where the ship was lost, Skydiver is attacked by the UFO and damaged, sinking to a ledge above the sea bed. However Skydiver is still able to launch Sky One, which tracks and destroys the UFO in Earth's atmosphere.

Each of Skydiver's crew except Lt. Barry must then take it in turn to use a single, faulty escape hatch that now takes 90 minutes to reset after each use. Straker orders Barry to use an alternate hatch which can only be employed once but, unbeknownst to him, it fails to open, trapping Barry. Two crew members reach the surface where Col. Freeman awaits them in an amphibious rescue aircraft but Lt. Tony Chin succumbs to his injuries on Skydiver.

Straker hears Barry's frantic yelling and frees her from the faulty hatch. They are the last two crew left on the submarine – Straker dealing with his claustrophobia – as the air is close to running out. Barry tells Straker that she is glad she will not die alone and that it is he who is with her (a reference to the episode "Confetti Check A-O.K.", which reveals that Nina Barry was one of SHADO's founding operatives). Straker meanwhile has flashbacks to the significant events of his life: his marriage to Mary, the birth of their son John and John being hit by a car, as seen in the episodes "Confetti Check A-O.K." and "A Question of Priorities". They finally manage to escape the sub when SHADO divers blow Skydiver off the ledge and they can access unblocked missile tubes.

== Regular cast ==
- Ed Bishop as Commander Ed Straker
- George Sewell as Colonel Alec Freeman
- Michael Billington as Colonel Paul Foster
- Gary Myers as Captain Lew Waterman
- Dolores Mantez as Lieutenant Nina Barry
- Keith Alexander as Lieutenant Keith Ford

== Production ==
Locations included: Neptune House at ATV Elstree Studios, Borehamwood; and Marlyn Cottage, Ley Hill, Buckinghamshire.

== Reception ==
Review website anorakzone.com considers "Sub-Smash" the sixth-best episode of UFO, stating that although "narratively it doesn't contain many surprises", the episode is elevated by "the final ten minutes, where Straker, losing his mind from lack of oxygen, has his life flash before his eyes, haunted by the tragedies that have befallen him."

Describing "Sub-Smash" as a "strong Straker-centric episode", John Kenneth Muir praises the "understated nature" of the emotions on display and the use of Dutch angles to convey claustrophobia.
