= Kill Straker! =

- UFO episode
- Episode no.: Episode 12
- Directed by: Alan Perry
- Written by: Donald James
- Editing by: Len Walter
- Production code: 16
- Original air date: 30 September 1970

Guest appearances
- David Sumner as Captain Frank Craig; Steve Cory as Moonbase guard; Louise Pajo as Nurse

Episode chronology
← Previous "Confetti Check A-O.K."	Next → "Sub-Smash"

"Kill Straker!" is the 12th episode of UFO, a 1970 British science fiction television series about an alien invasion of Earth. The screenplay was written by Donald James and the director was Alan Perry. The episode was filmed between 5 and 17 November 1969 and was first broadcast on 30 September 1970 on Border Television. It was the 16th episode filmed. The episode was originally titled "The Inside Man".

The series was created by Gerry Anderson and Sylvia Anderson with Reg Hill, and produced by the Andersons and Lew Grade's Century 21 Productions for Grade's ITC Entertainment company.

== Plot ==
Colonel Paul Foster and Captain Frank Craig are piloting a lunar module when it is approached by a UFO. Both are then subjected to mind-altering impulses that cause them to want to kill Commander Ed Straker. Straker makes a split-second decision that saves the men from crashing.

Returning to Moonbase, Foster starts to criticise Straker's performance and then Craig makes an unsuccessful attempt to kill Straker in his sleep. Craig also tries to destroy Moonbase's supply of air and water but is killed in the attempt. To further discredit Straker's abilities, Foster sends a critical report on him to General James Henderson, leading to a confrontation between Straker and Foster. Foster pulls a gun, a bullet punctures Moonbase's sphere and the two pass out from lack of oxygen.

Now back on Earth, Foster is placed under hypnosis by Dr. Jackson which reveals that the aliens mentally implanted the impulse to kill Straker. Although Foster's career with SHADO appears over, Straker is not willing to give up on him and decides to test if Foster can combat the urge. He puts himself and Foster in a sealed room and tries to convince Foster that he is going to kill him. Foster demonstrates that he can overcome the urge to kill Straker; soon after he is returned to active duty.

== Regular cast ==
- Ed Bishop as Commander Ed Straker
- Michael Billington as Colonel Paul Foster
- Grant Taylor as General James Henderson
- George Sewell as Colonel Alec Freeman
- Harry Baird as Lieutenant Mark Bradley
- Gabrielle Drake as Lieutenant Gay Ellis
- Dolores Mantez as Lieutenant Nina Barry
- Keith Alexander as Lieutenant Keith Ford
- Ayshea as Lieutenant Ayshea Johnson
- Vladek Sheybal as Dr Douglas Jackson

== Reception ==
Believing "Kill Straker!" to be one of UFO's poorer episodes, John Kenneth Muir criticises the characterisation, arguing that despite Foster's highly unusual behaviour his colleagues are very slow to realise what has happened to him. Muir also finds the premise unoriginal, noting that the idea of "sleeper agents" had been explored in earlier episodes. However, he praises the tension of the physical altercations between Foster and Straker.

Ranking all the UFO episodes, review website anorakzone.com places "Kill Straker!" seventeenth, commenting that while the plot "doesn't really go anywhere you wouldn't expect", the episode is "well put together and performed".
