= The Man Who Came Back (UFO) =

1971 episode of UFO

- UFO episode
- Episode no.: Episode 21
- Directed by: David Lane
- Written by: Terence Feely
- Editing by: Mike Campbell
- Production code: 21
- Original air date: 9 January 1971

Guest appearances
- Derren Nesbitt as Captain Craig Collins; Lois Maxwell as Miss Holland; Gary Raymond as Colonel John Grey; Roland Culver as Sir Esmond; Robert Grange as Moonbase doctor; Anouska Hempel as SHADO operative; Andrea Allan as Moonbase operative; David Savile as Hospital doctor; Nancy Nevinson as Housekeeper

Episode chronology
← Previous "Destruction"	Next → "The Psychobombs"

"The Man Who Came Back" is the 21st episode of UFO, a 1970 British science fiction television series about an alien invasion of Earth. The screenplay was written by Terence Feely and the director was David Lane. The episode was filmed from 17 to 29 June 1970, and was first broadcast on 9 January 1971 in Japan, and 3 February 1971 in the UK.

The series was created by Gerry Anderson and Sylvia Anderson with Reg Hill, and produced by the Andersons and Lew Grade's Century 21 Productions for Grade's ITC Entertainment company.

== Plot ==
Captain Craig Collins is presumed killed when his spacecraft, Ship 534, disappears during a successful UFO attack to disable SID (the Space Intruder Detector, the early warning satellite). However, he is located on an island a few weeks later with very little memory of his craft's splashdown. After S.H.A.D.O.'s medical unit approves his return to active duty, Straker assigns Collins to pilot the NASA SID 2 shuttle and repair SID due to Collins's intimate knowledge of its systems.

Meanwhile, Cols. Lake and Grey both notice changes in Collins's behaviour: he displays aggression when he kisses Col. Lake (who is standing in as Moonbase Commander), with whom he had a relationship before his accident; and he wins a chess game against Col. Grey in just a few moves whereas Collins had never been able to defeat Grey before. These observations are not enough to convince Straker that anything is wrong and he suggests that personal tensions may be colouring the perspective of Lake and Grey (while not admitting that his long friendship with Collins may be colouring his own judgement).

During a training weightlifting session, Collins seemingly accidentally injures his co-pilot Col. Paul Foster, leaving Straker as the only qualified person available to replace him. Collins, who has been under alien control since before his crash, plans to kill Straker but during a spacewalk Straker is warned by Foster and manages to sever Collins's oxygen supply, killing his friend instead.

== Regular cast ==
- Ed Bishop as Commander Ed Straker
- Michael Billington as Colonel Paul Foster
- Wanda Ventham as Colonel Virginia Lake
- Dolores Mantez as Lieutenant Nina Barry
- Ayshea as Lieutenant Ayshea Johnson
- Vladek Sheybal as Dr Douglas Jackson

== Reception ==
Review website AnorakZone.com ranks "The Man Who Came Back" the ninth-best episode of UFO, praising Nesbitt's guest role as a "real fun addition to what could otherwise have been a pedestrian 'alien control' plot". However, he criticises Collins and Lake's "curious" romantic relationship as well as the "burgeoning" attraction between Lake and Foster, which is absent in other episodes.

John Kenneth Muir argues that the episode's portrayal of workplace romance is its "most intriguing" part, noting (after mentioning Foster and Lake) that "it's just weird the way the characters go in and out of relationships, and those relationships are not referred to ever again". Calling the episode "tense and successful", Muir praises the special effects shots of the UFO attack on SID as well as the "delightful performance" of Nesbitt. However, he criticises Straker's characterisation, arguing that his inaction over Collins makes him appear a weak leader.
