= Survival (UFO) =

- UFO episode
- Episode no.: Episode 3
- Directed by: Alan Perry
- Written by: Tony Barwick
- Editing by: Alan Killick
- Production code: 4
- Original air date: 28 September 1970

Guest appearances
- Suzan Farmer as Tina Duval; Robert Swann as Bill Grant; Gito Santana as Alien; Ray Armstrong as Rescuer; David Weston as Rescuer

Episode chronology
| ← Previous "Exposed" | Next → "Conflict" |

"Survival" is the third episode of UFO, a 1970 British science fiction television series about an alien invasion of Earth. The screenplay was written by Tony Barwick and the director was Alan Perry. The episode was filmed between 30 June and 10 July 1970 and was first broadcast on 28 September 1970 in Canada, and 6 January 1971 in the UK. It was the fourth episode filmed.

The series was created by Gerry Anderson and Sylvia Anderson with Reg Hill, and produced by the Andersons and Lew Grade's Century 21 Productions for Grade's ITC Entertainment company.

== Plot ==
Under the cover of a meteor shower, a UFO manages to evade SHADO's tracking and land on the Moon. The alien pilot gets close enough to Moonbase to shoot out a window of the Leisure Sphere. The resulting explosive decompression kills an astronaut inside and almost kills Paul Foster.

Straker orders a search of the vicinity around Moonbase using Moon mobiles and they locate the UFO in a crater. The UFO shoots at the Moon mobiles whereupon the interceptors are called in. They shoot the UFO down as it tries to take off and it crashes into Foster's Moon mobile. Thrown clear, Foster is injured in the explosion and his spacesuit's radio transmitter is broken. SHADO believes that he has been killed.

Foster is not alone, however, as the alien has also survived. The two adversaries realise that to survive they need to co-operate on the walk back to Moonbase. They get close to their destination but a search team locates Foster. Believing the alien to be a threat and with Foster unable to contact the search team due to his broken radio, they shoot and kill the alien.

== Regular cast ==
- Ed Bishop as Commander Ed Straker
- George Sewell as Colonel Alec Freeman
- Michael Billington as Colonel Paul Foster
- Ayshea as Lieutenant Ayshea Johnson
- Dolores Mantez as Lieutenant Nina Barry
- Harry Baird as Lieutenant Mark Bradley

== Production ==
"Survival" features actor Michael Billington's first performance as Paul Foster. ("Exposed", which serves as the character's introduction, was the next episode to be filmed.) Rose Tobias Shaw, UFO's casting director, had previously cast Billington in an episode of The Prisoner.

Filming locations included Neptune House at ATV Elstree Studios in Borehamwood, and Windermere Hall in London.

== Reception ==
John Kenneth Muir regarded "Survival" as one of UFO's lesser episodes, commenting that "not much interesting happens". He argued that the scenes showing the uneasy alliance between Foster and the alien fail to convince, partly because the two space-suited characters are unable to communicate meaningfully with each other. Muir also highlighted a subplot in which Straker makes the black Lieutenant Bradley acting Moonbase commander despite the latter's concerns about being undermined by racism, which has supposedly disappeared in the near-future world of UFO: "Straker's hostility towards Bradley, bluntly informing him that he is the only one who still believes in racism, comes off in today's era as paternalistic and a bit condescending." On the tension between Straker and Bradley, Justin Richards wrote that Bradley's fear is "that even if no one openly resents his race, such [resentment] may surface under stress. The example he cites of sending a man out on the Moon, possibly to his death, is all the more poignant given [Moonbase operative Paul] Roper's death under similar circumstances [in the earlier episode "Flight Path"]."

Ranking the UFO episodes from best to worst, review website The Anorak Zone places "Survival" 15th, stating that the episode "sums up UFO in many ways, as it contains lots that's good and lots that's pretty terrible [...] However, it scores fairly high here for a customary dark twist, even if it doesn't all make perfect sense." Calling the episode "an interesting precursor to Enemy Mine", magazine Video Watchdog wrote that the music and direction create "effectively ominous atmosphere" in the scenes between Foster and the alien.
