= John Golightly =

Welsh actor (1936–2025)

- Born: 18 May 1936; Resolven, Wales
- Died: 17 October 2025 (aged 89); York, England
- Occupations: Stage, film and television actor

John Golightly (18 May 1936 – 17 October 2025) was a British actor, who appeared in numerous television productions over a 45-year period.

== Life and career ==
John Golightly was born in Resolven, Wales on 18 May 1936. His father was a transport foreman. After grammar school he trained as an actor at RADA and appeared in repertory theatres across Britain.

His television appearances included Colditz, UFO episode "Sub-Smash", Sapphire & Steel, Mitch, Lovejoy, Inspector Morse, Softly, Softly and Angels. Films include The Heroes of Telemark (1965), Laughter in the Dark (1969) and Nineteen Eighty-Four (1984). He has also appeared on Broadway.

Golightly later lived in York. He died at home on 17 October 2025, aged 89.

== Filmography ==
Year	Title	Role	Notes
1965	The Heroes of Telemark	Freddy	
1968	Attack on the Iron Coast	Helmsman	Uncredited
1972	Frenzy	CID Police Photographer	Uncredited
1984	Nineteen Eighty-Four	Patrolman	
1985	Lifeforce	Colonel	
2008	The 2007 Academy Award Nominated Short Films: Live Action	The Priest	
