= Timelash (UFO) =

- UFO episode
- Episode no.: Episode 26
- Directed by: Cyril Frankel
- Written by: Terence Feely
- Editing by: Lee Doig
- Production code: 24
- Original air date: 17 February 1971

Guest appearances
- Patrick Allen as Turner; Ron Pember as Casting agent; Kirsten Lindholm as Actress; Jean Wladon as Actor; Douglas Nottage as Maintenance man; John Lyons as Studio guard; John J. Carney as Studio security guard

Episode chronology
← Previous "The Long Sleep"	Next → —

"Timelash" is the 26th and final episode of UFO, a 1970 British science fiction television series about an alien invasion of Earth. The screenplay was written by Terence Feely and the director was Cyril Frankel. The episode was filmed at Pinewood Studios from 24 July to 6 August 1970, and was first broadcast on 17 February 1971 on Associated Television. It was the 25th episode filmed.

The series was created by Gerry Anderson and Sylvia Anderson with Reg Hill, and produced by the Andersons and Lew Grade's Century 21 Productions for Grade's ITC Entertainment.

== Plot ==
In the pre-titles sequence, Commander Straker appears to go berserk, smashing equipment in SHADO Headquarters. After a brief chase he is restrained and found to have a hypodermic needle and an ampoule of an unidentified drug on his person. Colonel Lake is found unconscious on the roof, while on the studio backlot a man's dead body is found in a mini-car. Dr Jackson subjects Straker to hypnosis, during which he relates the rest of the episode in flashback to Jackson and Colonel Foster.

Straker and Lake are attacked by a UFO while en route to Headquarters. As they pass through the outer checkpoint, night mysteriously turns into day; they find everyone and everything, both on the studio lots and inside SHADO HQ, frozen in time. The effect begins to overtake them as well. To counter it, they inject themselves with potentially life-threatening doses of an experimental stimulant.

Inside SHADO HQ they encounter Turner, a SHADO operative who is working for the aliens. He has placed a device in the HQ that freezes time on Earth and allows a UFO to approach the planet undetected. Straker and Lake attempt to kill Turner but he is able to manipulate time to avoid their attacks.

The UFO is waiting for time to unfreeze to attack SHADO HQ. Straker arms himself with a shoulder-fired missile to destroy it. However, Turner ambushes the pair, knocking Lake unconscious and stealing a key required to operate the missile. Straker hunts down Turner, chasing him in mini-cars through the studio lot. Turner tells Straker he cannot shoot him, for he is never where Straker sees him to be. To counter this, Straker – reasoning that Turner must still be nearby – shoots in a wide arc, hoping that at least one bullet will find its mark. He thereby kills Turner, gets the missile key, and destroys the incoming UFO; returning to HQ he begins smashing pieces of equipment, hoping to destroy Turner's device. By now the drug has made him paranoid, and he continues his destructive spree even after he succeeds and time unfreezes.

The story returns to the present. Jackson and Foster allow Straker to rest, while musing on the nature of time.

== Regular cast ==
- Ed Bishop as Commander Ed Straker
- Michael Billington as Colonel Paul Foster
- Wanda Ventham as Colonel Virginia Lake
- Dolores Mantez as Lieutenant Nina Barry
- Keith Alexander as Lieutenant Keith Ford
- Ayshea as Lieutenant Ayshea Johnson
- Vladek Sheybal as Dr Douglas Jackson
- Norma Ronald as Miss Ealand
- Grant Taylor as General James Henderson

== Production ==
Due to the nature of the plot, the supporting cast spent a large part of the shoot completely motionless. Filming was halted for two days after Ed Bishop injured his ankle on set. Glass-mounted matte paintings were used to create some of the frozen-in-time effects, such as unmoving puffs of tobacco smoke.

The outdoor action sequences were filmed on the Pinewood Studios backlot (representing the backlot of the fictional Harlington-Straker Film Studios) and included props made for other Pinewood productions. The mini-cars were supplied by a company called Overton, Challis Associates.

== Reception ==
Review website AnorakZone.com ranked "Timelash" the best episode of the series, finding it very similar in story – but superior in execution – to "The Premonition", an episode of The Outer Limits. The website commented that although Turner is basically "a ranting maniac", the lack of characterisation "scarcely matters [...] the plot is what drives this one", also praising the "drama" of the suspended-time premise and the episode's use of flashback. Starlog magazine noted the episode's "incredibly tense" climax.

According to TV Zone magazine, "this was by no means an ordinary episode, even for a series which has few episodes one could classify as 'ordinary' [...] In terms of its concentration on three characters for the most part, and its surreal and pseudoscientific plot, this episode was somewhat unusual." The magazine noted the episode's gun violence, stating that it features "probably the greatest use of gunfire in any UFO episode". It also commented that the opening sequence, in which Straker is found to be under the influence of an unknown drug (later identified as a stimulant), led some viewers to believe that the rest of the episode is a psychedelic trip experienced by Straker. It disagreed with this interpretation, pointing out clues which indicate that the events were real.

According to John Kenneth Muir, the episode is one of the series' best because it "operates on three levels of artistry": its "brilliant high concept" of SHADO being frozen in time; the platform given to for Bishop's "iron-willed character"; and the "self-reflexive" decision to set most of the action on a film studio backlot, which reminds viewers of the "essential artificiality and sleight-of-hand regularly deployed by films and television. A magical moment occurs, in other words, in a location devoted to creating magical illusions on a daily basis." Muir also praised Colonel Lake's characterisation and noted that the episode's depiction of stimulant use prompted some ITV franchises to omit Timelash from their first runs of UFO.
