= SHADO Interceptor =

Fictional spacecraft

- A SHADO Interceptor taking off
- First appearance: "Identified"
- Last appearance: "Reflections in the Water"

Information
- Affiliation: SHADO Moonbase

General characteristics
- Class: Space fighter
- Armaments: Front-mounted nuclear missile
- Propulsion: Nuclear fusion rocket and hovering system rockets

The SHADO Interceptor, or Moonbase Interceptor, is a fictional space fighter that appears in the 1970s British science fiction television series UFO. Operated by SHADO (Supreme Headquarters of the Alien Defence Organisation) from its Moonbase lunar outpost, the Interceptor squadrons serve as Earth's first line of defence against incoming alien spacecraft.

== Depiction ==
The Interceptors are white and red space fighters used over the Moon and in Earth's orbit, each equipped with a single self-destroying frontal nuclear missile. Hangared underground beneath lunar craters, they are carried to the surface on elevator platforms and take off vertically. They typically fly in squadrons of three, with all craft firing their missiles simultaneously.

For unknown reasons, the Interceptors cannot fly in Earth's atmosphere. However, their UFO opponents cannot stay in Earth's atmosphere for prolonged periods as they would probably explode. (Commander Straker, Colonel Freeman and Colonel Foster say this in "Survival", "Conflict", "The Square Triangle", "Sub-Smash" and "The Cat with Ten Lives".)

== Origin and design ==
The Interceptors were designed by Mike Trim and effects director Derek Meddings from a one-line description in the script for the first episode. The basic form was devised by Trim, who imagined the Interceptors as flying counterparts to the SHADO Moonmobile and wanted to give them a "uniform", "factory-built" appearance. Meddings later revised Trim's concept because he thought that it looked "too conventional" or "old-fashioned". The alterations included shrinking and re-shaping the craft while enlarging its cockpit windows. According to Trim, Meddings' re-working "streamlined the whole design".

Four studio models were built: one roughly 26-inch-long (66 cm) model for shooting close-ups, and three 13-inch (33 cm) versions for long shots. Although the models appear white on camera, they were actually painted a pale blue.

Meddings questioned the Interceptor's effectiveness in defending Earth, noting that by firing its one missile, the craft rendered itself "practically useless". A production memo stated that the simultaneous missile launches are precisely calculated to cause a "blanket atomic explosion" that engulfs enemy craft or forces them to change course, each missile having "[broken] up into ten smaller parts (similar to the way in which a 12-bore cartridge breaks up)".

Michael Peck, a contributor to Foreign Policy magazine, likens the Interceptors to "space-flying Harrier jump jets". He also writes that as they only ever flew in threes, it was fortunate for SHADO that "while the aliens could design spacecraft that travelled seven times the speed of light, they never mastered the tactic of attacking with four UFOs".

== Merchandise ==
The Dinky Interceptor was a die-cast toy made by Dinky Toys, based on the SHADO spacecraft. First released in 1971, it was manufactured and sold until the late 1970s. During this period, its appearance was changed several times. The earliest version was metallic green (instead of pale blue or white), with orange skis and stickers and gold details. Later versions switched the original pilot for a figurine of Joe McClaine (from the earlier Century 21 series Joe 90), which had first appeared in Dinky's Joe 90 Jet-Air Car.

In Japan, Bandai marketed a plastic version called the "Space Interceptor".
