= The Psychobombs =

- UFO episode
- Episode no.: Episode 22
- Directed by: Jeremy Summers
- Written by: Tony Barwick
- Editing by: Lee Doig
- Production code: 22
- Original air date: 30 December 1970

Guest appearances
- Deborah Grant as Linda Simmonds; Mike Pratt as Clem Mason; David Collings as Daniel Clark; Tom Adams as Captain Lauritzen; Alexander Davion as The Executive; Robin Hawdon as Captain, Skydiver 3; Christopher Timothy as Navigator, Skydiver 3; Peter Dolphin as Engineer, Skydiver 3; Mark York as Engineer, Skydiver 3; Peter Blythe as Lieutenant Blythe; Oscar James as Police Officer; Aiden Murphy as Guard; Peter Davies as Tracker Station Guard; Derek Steen as Tracker Station Guard; Gavin Campbell as Police Motorcyclist

Episode chronology
← Previous "The Man Who Came Back"	Next → "Mindbender"

"The Psychobombs" is the 22nd episode of UFO, a 1970 British science fiction television series about an alien invasion of Earth. The screenplay was written by Tony Barwick and the director was Jeremy Summers. The episode was filmed between 30 June and 10 July 1970, and was first broadcast on 30 December 1970 on Associated Television.

The series was created by Gerry Anderson and Sylvia Anderson with Reg Hill, and produced by the Andersons and Lew Grade's Century 21 Productions for Grade's ITC Entertainment company.

== Plot ==
A UFO lands in England, and takes control of the minds of two men and a woman (Linda Simmonds, Daniel Clark and Clem Mason). Each is given superhuman strength as well as being made into a walking bomb. Simmonds strangles a policeman close to her home, and each of the three is sent to destroy a SHADO installation. Following an unsuccessful attack on Straker's car, a note is found detailing three attacks on SHADO if it continues to operate.

Clark attacks the Fairfield Tracker Station, which he destroys by grabbing high-voltage power cables and then exploding. This is followed by Mason evading security and getting on board Skydiver 3, and destroying it by grabbing power cables as it leaves its base of operations.

Foster investigates Simmonds (following up on the strangled policeman), the last surviving 'living bomb', and takes her to SHADO headquarters unaware of what she is capable of. While in detention, Simmonds escapes and looks for high-voltage cables she can use to explode herself. Just before she manages to do this, Sky One destroys the UFO that has been controlling the humans, and Simmonds only electrocutes herself.

== Regular cast ==
- Ed Bishop as Commander Ed Straker
- Michael Billington as Colonel Paul Foster
- Vladek Sheybal as Dr Douglas Jackson
- Wanda Ventham as Colonel Virginia Lake
- Ayshea as Lieutenant Ayshea Johnson

== Production ==
Locations used for the filming included Heatherden Hall, Pinewood Studios and St Alphage House, London.

== Reception ==
Calling the episode "a pretty strong addition" even if the story is "pure formula", John Kenneth Muir likens the guest characters to terrorist suicide bombers, writing that "in a post-9/11 world, this entire plot line seems even more fascinating than it may have in the early 1970s".

Review website anorakzone.com ranks the episode the sixth-worst of the series, commenting that its "terrorism" theme is "rendered in pulp terms".
