= UFO (British TV series) =

British science fiction series (1970–1971)

- Genre: Science fiction
- Created by: Gerry & Sylvia Anderson; Reg Hill
- Starring: Ed Bishop; Michael Billington; Gabrielle Drake; George Sewell; Vladek Sheybal; Wanda Ventham; Ayshea; Antonia Ellis; Keith Alexander; Harry Baird; Peter Gordeno; Dolores Mantez; Gary Myers; Norma Ronald; Grant Taylor
- Music by: Barry Gray
- Country of origin: United Kingdom
- Original language: English
- No. of series: 1
- No. of episodes: 26

Production
- Executive producer: Gerry Anderson
- Producers: Reg Hill; Gerry Anderson
- Cinematography: Brendan J. Stafford
- Editors: Alan Killick; Harry MacDonald; Len Walter; Lee Doig; Mike Campbell
- Running time: 50 minutes
- Production company: Century 21 Television Productions
- Budget: £2.6 million

Original release
- Network: ITV
- Release: 16 September 1970 – 7 August 1971 (Associated Television)

UFO is a 1970 British science fiction television series about the covert efforts of an international defence organisation (under the auspices of the United Nations) to prevent an alien invasion of Earth. It was created by Gerry Anderson and Sylvia Anderson with Reg Hill, and produced by the Andersons and Lew Grade's Century 21 for Grade's ITC Entertainment company.

One series of 26 episodes (including the pilot) was filmed over the course of more than a year; a five-month production break was caused by the closure of MGM-British Studios in Borehamwood, where the show was initially made. Production then moved to Pinewood Studios in Buckinghamshire. UFO was first broadcast in the UK and Canada from 1970, and in the United States from 1972.

The Andersons' live-action science fiction film Doppelgänger (also known as Journey to the Far Side of the Sun) is considered to foreshadow UFO, their first entirely live-action TV series (their previous shows had used marionettes). The series featured actors, costumes, props, locations and music that had appeared in the film and 11 cast members of the film appeared in at least one episode of UFO.

Following syndication in the US and initial favourable ratings, a possible second series was planned; initially entitled UFO 1999, this eventually became Space: 1999, but with a different cast from UFO.

== Premise ==
The series' premise is that in 1980, Earth is being visited by aliens from a dying planet, who are abducting humans and harvesting their organs for their own bodies. The alien incursions may also be a prelude to an invasion. The series' main cast of characters are the staff of a secret, high-technology international military agency called SHADO (an acronym for Supreme Headquarters Alien Defence Organisation) established by the governments of the United Kingdom, the United States, the Soviet Union, France, and Germany to defend Earth and humanity against the mysterious aliens and learn more about them, while at the same time keeping the threat of an alien invasion hidden from the public.

Operating under the cover (as well as beneath the premises) of the Harlington-Straker Studios movie studio in England, SHADO is headed by Commander Edward Straker (Ed Bishop), a former United States Air Force colonel and astronaut, whose "cover" is his role as the studio's chief executive.

SHADO has a variety of high-tech hardware and vehicles at its disposal for a comprehensive defence of Earth. Early warnings of alien attack came from SID, the Space Intruder Detector, an unmanned, computerised tracking satellite that scans for UFO incursions. The forward line of defence is Moonbase from which the three lunar Interceptor spacecraft, each equipped with an explosive warhead, are launched. The second line of defence includes Skydiver, a submarine that carries the undersea-launched Sky One interceptor aircraft which attacks UFOs in Earth's atmosphere. The last line of defence is ground units including the armed, IFV-like SHADO Mobiles, fitted with caterpillar tracks.

On Earth, SHADO also uses two SHADAIR aircraft, a Seagull X-ray supersonic jet (e.g., in the episode "Identified") and a transport aircraft (e.g., in "A Question of Priorities"); a transatlantic Lunar Carrier with a separating Lunar Module (e.g., in "Computer Affair"); a helicopter (actually, a small VTOL aeroplane with large rotating propellers (e.g., in the episode "Ordeal"); and a radio-controlled Space Dumper (e.g., in "The Long Sleep"). The Moonbase has hovercraft-like Moon Hoppers–Moonmobiles that can be deployed for transportation or reconnaissance.

The alien race is never given a proper name, either by themselves or by human beings; they are simply referred to as "the aliens". They are humanoid in appearance and the post-mortem of the first alien captured reveals that they are harvesting organs from the bodies of abducted humans to prolong their own lives. The later episode "The Cat with Ten Lives" suggests that these "humanoids" are actually beings subject to alien mind control, and one "alien" body recovered was suspected of being completely Homo sapiens, "possessed" by one of the alien minds—a concept central to the Andersons' previous Supermarionation series Captain Scarlet and the Mysterons. Their faces are stained green by the hue of a green oxygenated liquid, which is believed to cushion their lungs against the extreme acceleration of interstellar flight; this liquid is contained in their helmets. To protect their eyes, the aliens wear opaque sclera contact lenses with small pinholes for vision. (The show's opening titles begin with a shot of one of these contact lenses being removed from an alien's eye.) The personal arms of the aliens resemble shiny metal sub-machine guns; these have a lower rate of fire than those used by SHADO.

The aliens' spacecraft can readily cross the vast distances between their planet and Earth at many times the speed of light (abbreviated and pronounced as "SOL"; e.g., "SOL one decimal seven" is 1.7 times the speed of light), but are too small to carry more than a few crew members. Their time on station is limited: UFOs can only survive for a couple of days in Earth's atmosphere before they deteriorate and finally explode. The UFOs can survive far longer underwater; one episode, "Reflections in the Water", deals with the discovery of a secret undersea alien base and shows one UFO flying straight out of an extinct volcano. A special underwater version of the standard UFO design is seen in "Sub-Smash". In flight, they are surrounded by horizontally spinning vanes and emit a distinctive pulsing electronic whine that sounds like a Shoooe-Wheeeh! (produced by series composer Barry Gray on an ondes Martenot). The craft is armed with a laser-type weapon, and conventional explosive warheads can destroy it.

== Cast and characters ==
UFO had a large ensemble cast; many of its members came and went during the course of the series, with some actors—such as George Sewell and Gabrielle Drake—leaving midway through the series, during the production break necessitated by the change of studio facilities. It is established early on that SHADO personnel rotate between positions, so the occasional disappearance of characters—some of whom later returned in other positions—fits the concept of the series. Also, owing to the scheduling of the series not reflecting the production order, some episodes featuring departed cast members were not broadcast until late in the series, which can give the impression that no major cast changes occurred. Only Ed Bishop appeared in every episode.

=== Main characters ===
Actor	Character	Role	No. of episodes
Ed Bishop	Col. Straker	Commander-in-chief of SHADO	26
Michael Billington	Col. Foster	SHADO operative	21
Gabrielle Drake	Lieut. Ellis	Moonbase operative	10
George Sewell	Col. Alec Freeman	Second-in-command of SHADO	17
Grant Taylor	Gen. Henderson	President of IAC	9
Wanda Ventham	Col. Lake	SHADO operative	9
Peter Gordeno	Capt. Carlin	First commander of Skydiver	6
Dolores Mantez	Lieut. Barry	Moonbase operative	23
Gary Myers	Capt. Waterman	Second commander of Skydiver	13
Keith Alexander	Lieut. Ford	Communications officer	16
Ayshea	Lieut. Johnson	SHADO headquarters officer	17
Vladek Sheybal	Dr Jackson	SHADO medical officer	14
Antonia Ellis	Lieut. Harrington	Moonbase operative	14
Norma Ronald	Miss Ealand	Straker's secretary	11
Harry Baird	Lieut. Bradley	Interceptor pilot	6

- Colonel Edward "Ed" Straker (Ed Bishop), Commander-in-chief of SHADO, is a former American Air Force colonel, pilot and astronaut originally from Boston, Massachusetts, who organised SHADO following a series of UFO attacks in 1970. Straker masquerades as the head of Harlington-Straker Film Studios, SHADO Headquarters being located directly below the studio.
- Colonel Paul Foster (Michael Billington) is introduced in the second episode "Exposed". A former test pilot, his plane was critically damaged when SHADO's Sky One intercepted and destroyed a UFO flying near Foster's jet. His persistent investigation of the incident threatened to expose SHADO's existence, so Straker offered him a position with SHADO.
- Lieutenant Gay Ellis (Gabrielle Drake), seen as Moonbase commander during the first half of the series. Ellis is occasionally portrayed as lacking self-confidence, and at other times as a take-charge officer. At one point she was briefly reassigned to SHADO HQ. It is implied that she may be in a romantic relationship with interceptor pilot Mark Bradley ("Computer Affair").
- Colonel Alec Freeman (George Sewell), a former pilot and intelligence officer, is SHADO's first officer (and very first operative recruited into SHADO by Straker) for 17 episodes in the series (Sewell left following the change of studios, and later was unavailable when series production resumed at Pinewood Studios). Freeman is Straker's closest friend and, occasionally, his muscle.
- General James Henderson (Grant Taylor), Straker's superior officer, serves as the president of the International Astrophysical Commission, which is a front for SHADO and is responsible for obtaining funds and equipment from various governments to keep SHADO operational. Straker and Henderson clash frequently over the needs of SHADO and economic realities. Ironically Straker had at the start recommended Henderson to head SHADO.
- Colonel Virginia Lake (Wanda Ventham) first appears in the opening episode ("Identified"), as the chief designer for Westbrook Electronics, the contractor for the SHADO's Utronics faster-than-light tracking system. During the last eight episodes, Lake returned to take over the post of SHADO first officer, replacing Alec Freeman.
- Captain Peter Carlin (Peter Gordeno), during the first third of the series, Carlin is the commander of the submarine Skydiver and pilot of its interceptor aircraft, Sky One. In 1970, Carlin and his sister found a UFO and were attacked; he was shot and wounded and his sister vanished. He joined SHADO in the hope of finding out what happened to his sister, and eventually learned that her organs had been harvested in "Identified". Gordeno left the show after six episodes because he wanted to avoid typecasting.
- Lieutenant Nina Barry (Dolores Mantez) is one of Straker's first recruits into SHADO. Barry works as a space tracker at Moonbase and later replaces Lieutenant Ellis as its commanding officer. She also serves aboard Skydiver in "Sub-Smash".
- Captain Lew Waterman (Gary Myers) is initially an interceptor pilot on the Moon; he is later promoted to captain, and replaces Peter Carlin as commanding officer of Skydiver and pilot of Sky One.
- Lieutenant Keith Ford (Keith Alexander) is a former television interviewer who became a founding member of SHADO and its main communications officer. Actor Keith Alexander left the series after the production break, so the character disappears at the two-thirds mark of the series.
- Lieutenant Ayshea Johnson (Ayshea) is a SHADO headquarters officer in 14 episodes, and later becomes SHADO's communications officer following the departure of Lieutenant Ford.
- Doctor Douglas Jackson (Vladek Sheybal) is the SHADO psychiatrist and science officer. He serves a number of capacities within SHADO, including acting as prosecution officer during the court-martial of Paul Foster. It is implied that "Douglas Jackson" is not the character's birth name, as he speaks with a strong Eastern European accent.
- Lieutenant Joan Harrington (Antonia Ellis) another Moonbase operative, was one of the organisation's earliest recruits, as seen in "Confetti Check A-O.K."
- Miss Ealand (Norma Ronald) is a SHADO operative who masquerades as Straker's movie studio secretary. She is the first line of defence against anyone entering SHADO HQ via Straker's office/elevator. The character is not seen in most of the post-studio change episodes, being replaced in two episodes by Miss Holland, played by Lois Maxwell.
- Lieutenant Mark Bradley (Harry Baird) is a Caribbean-born interceptor pilot based on the Moon. It is implied that he is romantically involved with Lieutenant Ellis, leading to a temporary assignment at SHADO HQ on Earth, and later briefly assumes the position of Moonbase commander. Baird left the series after filming four episodes, but appeared in stock footage in two later episodes.

=== Minor characters ===
One of the female Moonbase operatives, Joanna, was played by Shakira Baksh, who later married Michael Caine. Producer Gerry Anderson later said that he had lost his temper with her so badly on the set of UFO that he always feared running into Michael Caine at some actors' function, and being punched on the nose by him.

Interceptor pilot Steve Minto was played by Steven Berkoff. Lieutenant Sylvia Howell, a Skydiver technician, was played by Georgina Moon.

== Episodes ==
Due to the fragmented nature of the ITV network in the 1970s, the network's regional franchises broadcast the 26 episodes of UFO in different orders, none of them matching the production order. Fifteen of the episodes first aired in either Canada or Japan before their UK premieres. The table below lists the episodes in the viewing order recommended by ITC.

No.	Title	Directed by	Written by	Original broadcaster	Original air date	Prod. code
1	"Identified"	Gerry Anderson	Gerry & Sylvia Anderson and Tony Barwick	CTV, Canada	14 September 1970	1
SHADO officially goes into operation and encounters its first UFO. An alien pilot is captured and discovered to have transplanted human organs.
2	"Exposed"	David Lane	Tony Barwick	CTV, Canada	21 September 1970	9
After civilian test pilot Paul Foster is caught in a UFO incident, he persistently strives to expose the truth.
3	"Survival"	Alan Perry	Tony Barwick	CTV, Canada	28 September 1970	4
Foster is stranded on the Moon's surface, where he befriends a similarly stranded alien.
4	"Conflict"	Ken Turner	Ruric Powell	CTV, Canada	5 October 1970	5
After a Moon shuttle is mysteriously destroyed, Straker campaigns to have space junk removed from Earth's orbit.
5	"A Question of Priorities"	David Lane	Tony Barwick	ATV & Tyne Tees, UK	14 October 1970	7
Straker faces a terrible decision: attend to an alien defector or deliver life-saving medicine to his critically injured son.
6	"The Square Triangle"	David Lane	Alan Pattillo	CTV, Canada	19 October 1970	11
SHADO and an alien find themselves in the midst of a murderous romantic triangle.
7	"Ordeal"	Ken Turner	Tony Barwick	CTV, Canada	26 October 1970	8
SHADO races to rescue Foster after he is abducted from a medical facility.
8	"E.S.P."	Ken Turner	Alan Fennell	Tyne Tees, UK	7 October 1970	15
A man with ESP knowledge of SHADO is co-opted by the aliens.
9	"Close Up"	Alan Perry	Tony Barwick	NTV, Japan	31 October 1970	13
SHADO obtains what may be the first photos of the alien home world.
10	"Court Martial"	Ron Appleton	Tony Barwick	CTV, Canada	16 November 1970	12
Colonel Foster is tried and sentenced to death after a security leak is traced to him.
11	"Confetti Check A-O.K."	David Lane	Tony Barwick	CTV, Canada	23 November 1970	14
A flashback episode focusing on SHADO's formation and how it caused the failure of Straker's marriage.
12	"Kill Straker!"	Alan Perry	Donald James	Border, UK	30 September 1970	16
Foster and his lunar module co-pilot, Captain Frank Craig, are brainwashed by aliens to kill Straker.
13	"Sub-Smash"	David Lane	Alan Fennell	Anglia & ATV, UK	11 November 1970	17
Straker must face his claustrophobia when the Skydiver submarine is damaged and unable to surface.
14	"The Dalotek Affair"	Alan Perry	Ruric Powell	CTV, Canada	14 December 1970	6
Communications problems at Moonbase are traced to a non-SHADO mining operation.
15	"Flight Path"	Ken Turner	Ian Scott Stewart	CTV, Canada	21 December 1970	3
A blackmailed SHADO operative opens the door for a possible alien attack on Moonbase.
16	"Computer Affair"	David Lane	Tony Barwick	Border & Tyne Tees, UK	9 December 1970	2
A SHADO investigation reveals that romance may be complicating Moonbase operations.
17	"The Responsibility Seat"	Alan Perry	Tony Barwick	CTV, Canada	2 January 1971	10
Straker is attracted to a reporter who poses a possible security leak for SHADO.
18	"The Cat with Ten Lives"	David Tomblin	David Tomblin	ATV & Tyne Tees, UK	30 September 1970	18
A SHADO interceptor pilot is placed under a hypnotic spell by an alien-influenced cat.
19	"The Sound of Silence"	David Lane	David Lane and Bob Bell	Border, UK	7 October 1970	19
A show jumper is abducted by the aliens.
20	"Destruction"	Ken Turner	Dennis Spooner	Anglia & ATV, UK	2 December 1970	20
The aliens attack a Royal Navy destroyer that is dumping sealed containers of highly toxic nerve gas in the sea.
21	"The Man Who Came Back"	David Lane	Terence Feely	NTV, Japan	9 January 1971	21
A SHADO pilot who was believed dead but turned up alive exhibits suspicious personality changes.
22	"The Psychobombs"	Jeremy Summers	Tony Barwick	Anglia & ATV, UK	30 December 1970	22
The aliens transform three humans into walking bombs.
23	"Mindbender"	Ken Turner	Tony Barwick	Anglia & ATV, UK	13 January 1971	25
An alien crystal causes Lieutenant Andy Conroy, Straker and other SHADO operatives to hallucinate.
24	"Reflections in the Water"	David Tomblin	David Tomblin	NTV, Japan	6 February 1971	23
Straker and Foster investigate an undersea alien base where SHADO and its personnel have been duplicated.
25	"The Long Sleep"	Jeremy Summers	David Tomblin	CTV, Canada	13 March 1971	26
A woman awakening from a decade-long coma sparks a hunt for an alien bomb.
26	"Timelash"	Cyril Frankel	Terence Feely	Anglia & ATV, UK	17 February 1971	24
A UFO freezes time at the studio for everyone but Straker, Colonel Lake and a mysterious enemy.

=== Alternative viewing orders ===
- Prod: the order in which the episodes were filmed. This is largely the same as the production code number order in the table above.
- ATV: this is the sequence in which the episodes were originally scheduled to be broadcast in the UK by ATV.
- UFO Series: the order recommended by Marc Martin of http://www.ufoseries.com.
- Fanderson: the order recommended by Fanderson and used for the British DVD releases.
- ITC: (same as the table above) the order used for the British VHS releases.

Title	Original ATV airdate	Prod	ATV	UFOS	Fanderson	ITC
"Identified"	16 September 1970	1				
"Computer Affair"	15 May 1971	2	21	2		16
"Flight Path"	20 January 1971	3	15	3		15
"Survival"	6 January 1971	4	13	6	5	3
"Exposed"	23 September 1970	5	2	4		2
"Conflict"	7 October 1970	6	4	5	6	4
"The Dalotek Affair"	10 February 1971	7	17	7		14
"A Question of Priorities"	14 October 1970	8	5	8		5
"Ordeal"	24 April 1971	9	19	9		7
"The Responsibility Seat"	31 July 1971	10	25	10		17
"The Square Triangle"	9 December 1970	11	10	11		6
"Court Martial"	1 May 1971	12	20	12		10
"Close Up"	16 December 1970	13	11	13		9
"Confetti Check A-O.K."	10 July 1971	14	22	14		11
"E.S.P."	21 October 1970	15	6	15		8
"Kill Straker!"	4 November 1970	16	7	16		12
"Sub-Smash"	11 November 1970	17	8	17		13
"The Sound of Silence"	17 July 1971	18	23	18		19
"The Cat with Ten Lives"	30 September 1970	19	3	19		18
"Destruction"	2 December 1970	20	9	20		20
"The Man Who Came Back"	3 February 1971	21	16	21		21
"The Psychobombs"	30 December 1970	22	12	22		22
"Reflections in the Water"	24 July 1971	23	24	23		24
"Timelash"	17 February 1971	25	18	24		26
"Mindbender"	13 January 1971	24	14	25		23
"The Long Sleep"	7 August 1971	26				25

The North American DVD release of the series usually follows the production order, with a few diversions; a website ufoseries.com for the show offers seven possibilities of viewing sequence. According to The Complete Gerry Anderson, the episode "Exposed" was intended to be aired second, but it was produced fifth and appears as the fifth episode in the American DVD release. It was only when the entire series was repeated by BBC Two in 1996–1997 that the series was shown in chronological production order in the UK for the first time.

On the website shadolibrary.org, Deborah Rorabaugh has created a timeline of events in chronological order, using a few known dates and facts. For example, "Exposed" should come before all other episodes featuring Paul Foster, and there are a few definitive dates given (two newspaper dates, a death and script date).

== Production ==
Opening theme music
30 seconds of the opening theme

Following lukewarm ratings for Joe 90 (1968–1969) and the cancellation of children's espionage television series The Secret Service (1969) after only 13 episodes, Lew Grade approached Gerry Anderson to look into creating his first live-action TV series. Anderson worked with his wife, Sylvia, and producer Reg Hill to create a science fiction adventure series based on UFOs. Anderson said the core idea for the series was that UFO sightings were a common issue during the late 1960s, and that the idea of aliens harvesting human organs came from the work of Christiaan Barnard and his pioneering transplant operations. The creative team initially envisioned an organisation called UFoeDO (Unidentified Foe Defence Organisation), which was to become the secret SHADO (Supreme Headquarters Alien Defence Organisation).

Many of the props and actors that had appeared in the Anderson-produced 1969 movie Doppelgänger were used in the series. The creators looked ten years ahead and placed the series in a 1980s future. Sylvia Anderson designed the costumes for the show, including the Moonbase uniforms and purple wigs that female staff wore; the wigs were to become a major reference point for the series.

In addition to the shift from using marionettes to real actors, another key point of difference is that while the Andersons' previous series were explicitly made for all ages, UFO was a deliberate attempt to court young adult and adult viewers. Some UFO episodes included serious adult themes such as divorce, drug use, the challenge of maintaining work/family balance, mind control, alien abduction, illegal organ harvesting, and murder.

Establishing the main character and principal location as the chief executive of a movie studio was a cost-saving move by the producers: the Harlington-Straker Studio was the actual studio where the series was being filmed, originally the MGM-British Studios in Borehamwood (later moved to Pinewood Studios)—although the exterior of the Harlington-Straker studio office block seen throughout the series was actually Neptune House, an office building at ATV Elstree Studios, also in Borehamwood. Pinewood's studio buildings and streetscapes were used extensively in later episodes, particularly "Timelash" and "Mindbender"—the latter featuring scenes that show the behind-the-scenes workings of the UFO sets, when Straker briefly finds himself hallucinating that he and his colleagues are actors in a TV series. In "The Man Who Came Back", the main set for The Devils, then in production at Pinewood, can be seen in the background of several scenes.

The studio-as-cover concept served multiple practical and narrative functions: It was simple and cost-effective for the production, it provided an engaging vehicle for the viewer's suspension of disbelief, it eliminated the need to build an expensive exterior set for the SHADO base, and it combined the all-important "secret" cover (concealment and secrecy are always central themes in Anderson dramas) with at least nominal plausibility. A studio was a business where unusual events and routines would not be remarkable or even noticed. Comings and goings at odd times, the movement of people and unusual vehicles, equipment and material would not create undue interest and could easily be explained away as sets, props, or extras.

=== Filming ===
Principal photography commenced in April 1969 with production based at MGM-British Studios. Seventeen episodes were filmed at these studios before they closed at the end of 1969. Production resumed at Pinewood Studios when studio space became available in June 1970, making UFO a 17-month-long production by the time the final nine episodes were completed. After the break, George Sewell (who played Colonel Freeman) and Gabrielle Drake (Lieutenant Ellis) were no longer available, and left the series.

Harry Baird, who played interceptor pilot Mark Bradley, had left the series after just four episodes, citing contractual problems (although he reappeared in a few later episodes from stock footage). Skydiver Captain Peter Carlin, played by Peter Gordeno, left after eight episodes out of a fear of being typecast.

The different writers and directors, as well as a production break when MGM-British Studios was closed, resulted in episodes of varying quality.

=== Costumes ===
The Andersons never explained at the time why female Moonbase personnel uniformly wore mauve or purple wigs, silver catsuits, and extensive eye make-up, and their unusual apparel is never discussed in the series. Gerry Anderson has since commented that it made them look more futuristic and that it filmed better under the bright lights, while Sylvia Anderson said she believed wigs would become accepted components of military uniforms by the 1980s. However, in an interview given toward the end of her life, Sylvia explained that the decision was a combination of visual appeal and practicality—the wigs provided a striking and futuristic look, but they also saved the production the considerable time and expense of having to style the hair of each of the female Moonbase staff for each episode, as well as keeping the "look" of the hairstyles consistent from episode to episode. However, whenever female Moonbase personnel visited Earth (as Ellis and Barry did from time to time), their lunar uniforms and wigs were never worn.

Ed Bishop, who had naturally dark hair, initially bleached his hair for Straker's unique white-haired look. After the break in production he began wearing a white wig. Until not long before his death he possessed one of the wigs he wore on the show, and took great delight in displaying it at science fiction conventions and on TV programmes. Bishop also kept a Certina watch that was specially made for his character.

Other male characters in the series also wore wigs, again because the Andersons felt that they would become fashionable by the 1980s. Michael Billington does not wear a wig in early episodes; these can be identified by his receding hairline and long sideburns.

Only two of the alien suits were made, so at no point in the series are more than two of the aliens seen on screen at any one time. (In the episode "Ordeal", Paul Foster is carried by two aliens while he is wearing an alien space suit, but one of those two aliens is always off-screen when Foster is on-screen.) The alien spacesuit costumes were made of red spandex. At the start of production, the alien spacesuits were ornamented with brass chain mesh, as seen in the episode "Survival". Later, this was replaced by silvery panels. In reality, the dark vertical bands on the sides of the helmets were slits meant to allow the actors to breathe.

Sylvia Anderson, having made a pair of very sheer trousers for actor Patrick Allen to wear in the episode "Timelash", later regretted not having had the nerve to ask him to wear a jockstrap underneath, and commented on the DVD release of the series that "you should not be able to tell which side anybody's 'packet' is on".

=== Special effects ===
The special effects, supervised by Derek Meddings, were produced on the cheap. In a refinement of the underwater effect developed for Stingray, Meddings' team devised a disconcerting effect – a double-walled visor for the alien space helmets, which could be gradually filled from the bottom up with green-dyed water. When filmed from the appropriate angle it produced an illusion of the helmet filling up and submerging the wearer's head. The series also revisited and improved on the clever and cheap aquatic effects originally devised for Stingray. The submerged launch of Sky One was filmed on a special set dressed to look like an underwater location; a thin, glass-walled water tank containing small fish and equipped with small air-bubble generators was placed in front of the camera, the set behind the tank was filled with smoke, and set elements were agitated with fans to simulate water movement, creating a convincing underwater scene without any of the high cost or technical problems associated with real underwater filming.

=== Vehicle design ===
The vehicles were designed by Meddings and his assistant Mike Trim. As with all these Anderson series, the look and narrative action of UFO relied heavily on the miniature props and special effects sequences created by Meddings and his team, who devised a range of low-cost techniques used to create convincing miniature sets and locations and miniature action scenes featuring ground transportation, underwater, atmospheric and space travel, and dramatic explosion effects. Most production miniatures typically consisted of a mixture of custom-made elements and detail pieces cannibalised from commercial scale model kits.

The futuristic gull-winged cars driven by Straker and Foster were originally built for Doppelgänger. The cast found Straker's car, which was adapted from a Ford, hard to drive. During the shooting of UFO, David Lowe and Sydney Carlton raised funds to form a company called The Explorer Motor Company, dedicated to the mass production of these cars for sale to the public. A plastic mould was made of the Straker car, in preparation for mass production, but the company never got off the ground.

The blue SHADO Jeeps – six-wheeled light-utility vehicles – were also originally supplied for Doppelgänger. The bodies were made of marine ply, fibreglass and perspex, built on a Mini Moke chassis incorporating an extra rear axle and modified by re-positioning the windscreen rearwards. As with the other SHADO vehicles, they incorporated gull-wing doors operated by a prop man out of shot.

As with all the Anderson series of that period, very few original series props and miniatures have survived, and these are now highly valuable collector's items. Miniatures from the series known to still exist include:

- Two of the alien flying saucer UFO miniatures
- A single large-scale miniature of Sky One
- One large-scale and one small-scale miniature of the Moonbase Interceptors (which survived because they were given to Dinky for production of its Interceptor toys)
- The (badly damaged) front section only of the smaller miniature of the Space Intruder Detector (SID)
- The large-scale model of the SID2 orbital shuttle
- One prime mover of Marker Universal Transporter truck (the lorry and trailer used to secretly transport the SHADO Mobile vehicles to their operation sites)
- One large-scale SHADO ambulance
- One large-scale Harlington-Straker Studio transport truck (The model, based on the Mk 1 Ford Transit, had previously appeared in the final Supermarionation series The Secret Service)

== Broadcast ==
UFO confused broadcasters in Britain and the United States, who could not decide if it was a show for adults or for children. In the UK, the first episodes were originally shown in the 5:15 p.m. tea-time slot on Saturdays, and then on Saturday mornings during an early repeat, by both Southern Television — which began broadcasting UFO almost two months before the London area – and London Weekend Television. That the Andersons were primarily associated with children's programming did not help matters.

In the US, the series first aired between 1972 and 1973.

In 1996, the series was repeated in the UK on Bravo and BBC2.

== Reception ==
Tony Jones of starburstmagazine.com gives the series a favourable review: "To a large extent, UFO is still very watchable [...] even if effects have moved on considerably in the past several decades. The music works, the costumes are memorable, and even if some of the future looks rather dated now, the stories themselves are still strong". Paul Mounts comments that even if many episodes "seem ponderous by today's standards", the series is "really all about those extraordinary visuals, the thunderingly exciting Barry Gray signature music [...] thrilling title sequence [and] overarching scenario". He argues that the final nine episodes, filmed after the move to Pinewood Studios and featuring increasingly "action-orientated" plots, were an improvement on the first 17.

Other reviews have been more critical. In 1972, a commentator for the Los Angeles Free Press wrote that UFO "plays like a combination of the worst traits of Batman and Star Trek". A 1973 review by Cleveland Amory criticised the writing and dialogue, the "plaster cast" of supporting characters, the level of violence, and a perceived sexism from some characters, commenting that "outer space, even in 1980, is still crawling with male chauvinist pigs." He also wrote that "[t]he idea that anything in outer space must be an enemy is perhaps one of the most offensive things here." According to Gary Westfahl, the series has "an intriguing premise [...]; the special effects were impeccable; and even the acting was better that usual. But Anderson proved unable to imaginatively develop his story, as later episodes reveal that the aliens were People Who Look and Act Just Like Us, and the show slowed down to stupefied inertia as the aliens increasingly focused all of their energies on repetitive schemes to kill the show's hero, Stryker [sic]."

According to a retrospective by Den of Geek, UFO "caught perfectly the depressive and fatalistic Zeitgeist of 1970s cinema, with relentlessly bleak endings and a hell of a lot of suffering on the way to them. It mixed inventive scripting with frequently trite dialogue and vice versa; it put highly charged emotional, adult situations in the hands of actors who were often wearing absurd purple or platinum wigs [...] It kept you off-guard in a manner that few other shows have ever achieved, intentionally or otherwise."

Some reviews have commented on the series' mix of themes. In an article for Cinema Retro, Tim Greaves writes that UFO was the Andersons' first step "towards something aimed at a more mature audience, its storylines touching upon some distinctly adult themes. Not only was there the ever-present core threat of aliens abducting humans and harvesting their organs to sustain their dying race; there were flirtations with adultery, divorce, interracial romance and the recreational use of hallucinogenic drugs [...] The very appearance of the aliens was disconcertingly sinister, sporting eerie liquid-filled helmets [...] Additionally, the characters regularly made flawed decisions and not all the stories concluded happily. There was also a pervasive frisson of sexuality throughout the series [...]. Peter Hutchings of Northumbria University argues that in trying to be more "adult-centred" than earlier Anderson productions, the series "[contained, limited or diminished] its generic science fiction elements". He notes that only six of the first 17 episodes focus squarely on the alien threat; in other episodes, the aliens are incidental to storylines that have little grounding in science fiction, such as the organisational politics of SHADO and "tensions between emotional expression and operational efficiency".

== Aborted second series ==
In late 1972, two years after the 26 episodes were completed, the series was syndicated on American television. Many stations which carried the series were affiliated with CBS; they tended to schedule the show in the Saturday evening hour leading into All in the Family, the hugely popular comedy which was the highest-rated program on all of U.S. television at the time. The ratings of UFO in New York were initially high enough to prompt ITC to commission a second series.

As the Moon-based episodes had proven more popular than the Earth-based stories, in the new series, the action would take place entirely on the Moon. Gerry Anderson proposed a format in which SHADO Moonbase had been greatly enlarged to become the organisation's main headquarters, and pre-production on UFO 2 began with extensive research and design for the new Moonbase. These developments had precedent in the earlier episodes: a subplot of "Kill Straker!" sees Straker negotiating with SHADO's financial supporters for funding to build more moonbases within 10 years. However, when ratings for the syndicated broadcasts in America dropped towards the end of the run, ITC cancelled the second series plans. Unwilling to let the UFO 2 pre-production work go to waste, Anderson instead offered ITC a new series idea, unrelated to UFO, in which the Moon would be blown out of Earth orbit taking the Moonbase survivors with it. This proposal developed into Space: 1999.

== Merchandise ==
Like many of Anderson's productions, the series inspired a variety of merchandise, including toys modeled after the SHADO vehicles. The classic Dinky die-cast range of vehicles featured robust yet finely finished products, and included Straker's futuristic gull-winged gas turbine car, the SHADO mobile and the missile-bearing Lunar Interceptor, though Dinky's version of the interceptor was released in a lurid metallic green finish unlike the original's stark white. Like the Thunderbirds and Captain Scarlet models, the original Dinky toys are now prized collector's items. All the major vehicles, characters, and more have been produced in model form many times over by a large number of licensee companies; the Anderson shows and their merchandise have always had widespread popularity, but they are especially popular in Japan.

== Compilation films ==
In the 1970s and 1980s a number of the episodes were cut and compiled to create compilation films. Among these was Invasion: UFO, a 1980 compilation of scenes from "Identified", "Computer Affair", "Reflections in the Water", "Confetti Check A-O.K.", "The Man Who Came Back" and "E.S.P.", featuring new title music. A subtitled Invasion: UFO was released in Japan as the first of eight VHS and Betamax tape UFO volumes by Emotion Video in 1984, and on LaserDisc format.

Italian producers KENT and INDIEF made compilation films which met mixed reviews. The films used music tracks from the James Bond films From Russia with Love and Thunderball, for UFO's composer, Barry Gray, had his name confused with Bond composer John Barry. The Italian films are:

- UFO – Allarme rosso... attacco alla Terra! (lit. 'Red alert... attack on Earth!', KENT, 1973) from episodes "The Cat with Ten Lives", "The Psychobombs" and "Timelash"
- UFO – Distruggete Base Luna (lit. 'Destroy Moonbase', KENT, 1973): "The Cat with Ten Lives", "Confetti Check A-O.K.", "Flight Path", "The Psychobombs", "A Question of Priorities" and "Kill Straker!"
- UFO – Prendeteli vivi (lit. 'Catch them alive', INDIEF, 1974): "Computer Affair", "Ordeal", "The Sound of Silence", "Destruction" and "Reflections in the Water"
- UFO – Contatto Radar... stanno atterrando...! (lit. 'Radar contact... they are landing...!', INDIEF, 1974): "Exposed", "Survival", "Court Martial" and "Sub-Smash"
- UFO – Annientate SHADO... Uccidete Straker... Stop! (lit. 'Annihilate SHADO... Kill Straker... ["Stop!" as a telegraphic pause]', KENT, 1974): "Identified", "Computer Affair" and "Reflections in the Water"

== Home media ==
In 1986–1987, Channel 5 released a seven-volume VHS collection of episodes (volumes 2–7), preceded by the compilation film Invasion: UFO (volume 1), while a similar series was later released by ITC in 1993.

The complete series was released on DVD in the UK and in North America in 2002 and in Australia in 2007. Bonus features include a commentary by Gerry Anderson on the pilot episode "Identified", and an actor's commentary by Ed Bishop on the episode "Sub-Smash". There are also deleted scenes, stills and publicity artwork.

In 2002, A&E Home Entertainment, under licence from Carlton International Media Limited released the complete series on Region 1 (US/North America) DVD.

In April 2025, Australian media company ViaVision released a Blu-ray box set of the series under the title "UFO: The Complete S.H.A.D.O. Files". The discs are described as having been "restored from the original film elements with additional grading work and updates applied to select episodes".

== Proposed feature film ==
In 2009, it was announced that Robert Evans and ITV Global would produce a feature film adaptation of the series. Ryan Gaudet and Joseph Kanarek were to write the script, which was to be set in 2020. It was announced that the film would be visual effects supervisor Matthew Gratzner's directorial debut and its protagonist would be Colonel Foster, who was to be played by Joshua Jackson. Ali Larter was linked to the role of Colonel Lake. The film did not enter production.

== In other media ==
Stories set in the Gerry Anderson UFO series have appeared in various media:

- Two novelisations based on the series, written by John Burke under the pseudonym "Robert Miall", were published in the UK and America:
  - UFO (published in the US as UFO-1: Flesh Hunters). Novelises portions of the TV episodes "Identified", "Exposed", "Close Up" and "Court Martial".
  - UFO 2 (published in the US as UFO-2: Sporting Blood). Novelises the TV episodes "Computer Affair", "The Dalotek Affair" and "Survival".
- UFO comic strips were published in the comics Countdown and TV Action.
- UFO episodes were adapted as photo comics in the Italian publication I film di UFO ("The UFO films").
- An Italian-language board game of the race game type was published, called "Distruggete Base Luna" ("Destroy Moonbase"; in reference to the compilation movie), with up to four players, each representing an alien trying to penetrate Moonbase, and one player representing Straker in charge of Moonbase.
- Julian Gollop of British independent video game developer Mythos Games has cited UFO as one of the influences for the storyline of the video game UFO: Enemy Unknown (in particular, an idea of an international counter-UFO organisation and the psionic powers of some alien races) even though he thought the series itself was "a bit boring".
- Character designer Yoshiyuki Sadamoto drew inspiration from UFO for the character designs for Gendo Ikari and Kozo Fuyutsuki in Neon Genesis Evangelion (from Straker and Freeman respectively).

== Translations ==
- French: UFO – Alerte dans l'espace (France–O.R.T.F.)
- German: Ufo – Weltraumkommando S.H.A.D.O.
- Japanese: Nazo no Enban Yū-Efu-Ō (謎の円盤UFO, UFO: The Mysterious Saucers)
- Italian: UFO (Italy – R.A.I. TV) and Minaccia dallo spazio (Swiss Canton of Ticino) – T.S.I. TV)
- Spanish: OVNI (although the Spanish 2007 DVD release title remains UFO)
- Brazilian Portuguese: OVNI: Objeto Voador Não Identificado (TV dubbed version)
