= Identified (UFO) =

1970 episode of UFO

- UFO episode
- Episode no.: Episode 1
- Directed by: Gerry Anderson
- Written by: Gerry & Sylvia Anderson; Tony Barwick
- Editing by: Alan Killick
- Production code: 1
- Original air date: 14 September 1970

Guest appearances
- Shane Rimmer as Lieutenant Johnson; Basil Dignam as Cabinet Minister; Maxwell Shaw as Dr Shroeder; Michael Mundell as Lieutenant Matthews; Paul Gillard as Kurt Mahler; Gary Files as Phil Wade; Matthew Robertson as Dr Harris; Annette Kerr as Nurse; Edwina Carroll as Leila Carlin; Gito Santana as Alien; Louisa Rabaiotti as SHADO Operative; Penny Spencer as Janis; Dennis Plenty as Lieutenant Worth; Jack Silk as Motorcyclist

Episode chronology
← Previous —	Next → "Exposed"

"Identified" is the first episode of UFO, a 1970 British science fiction television series about an alien invasion of Earth. It was written by Gerry Anderson, Sylvia Anderson and Tony Barwick, and directed by Gerry Anderson. Filmed between 28 April and 12 May 1969, it was first broadcast on 14 September 1970 in Canada, and 16 September 1970 in the UK.

The series was created by the Andersons with Reg Hill, and produced by the Andersons' company Century 21 Productions for Grade's ITC Entertainment.

== Plot ==
In 1970, two women and a man come across a UFO that has landed in a wood. The man, Peter Carlin (Peter Gordeno), starts filming the craft, but the trio are fired upon by the alien occupants. One of the women is killed, Carlin is shot and injured while the third, Carlin's sister, is abducted.

Imagine a dying planet in some distant corner of the universe. Its natural resources exhausted. Its inhabitants sterile. Doomed to extinction. A situation we may one day find ourselves in, gentlemen. So they discover Earth. Abundant, fertile. Able to satisfy their needs. They look upon us not with animosity, but callousness. As we look upon our animals that we depend on for food. Yes, it appears they are driven by circumstance across a billion miles of space, driven on by the greatest force in the universe – survival.

— Ed Straker, "Identified"

Increasing UFO activity brings (as shown in the later episode "Confetti Check A-O.K.") the United States, the Soviet Union, the United Kingdom, France and West Germany together to combat the perceived threat. While en route to a secret meeting with the British Prime Minister, Colonel Ed Straker and General Henderson's (Ed Bishop and Grant Taylor) car and its police motorcycle escorts are attacked by a UFO. Straker is thrown clear but Henderson is seriously wounded.

By 1980, the international community has established a secret organisation – SHADO (the Supreme Headquarters, Alien Defence Organisation) – in Britain to track and deal with incoming UFO threats. Straker is now in command of this organisation. SHADO is hidden beneath Harlington-Straker, a working film studio used as cover for the underground base. Straker's cover involves being a film producer.

Following a fire at Westbrook Electronics, Colonel Freeman (George Sewell) is piloting a transporter aircraft from Los Angeles carrying top-secret equipment to track UFOs in deep space, as well as its creator Colonel Virginia Lake (Wanda Ventham). SID, the Space Intruder Detector – a tracking satellite that detects incoming UFOs – reports a spacecraft heading for the North Atlantic.

SHADO Moonbase launches three interceptors which fire on the UFO. However, it manages to escape destruction. SHADO control authorise Skydiver submarine to launch the Sky 1 interceptor aircraft piloted by Captain Peter Carlin. The UFO enters the atmosphere and fires at the transporter, but is shot down by Sky 1 and disintegrates in the ocean.

An injured alien occupant survives the crash and is taken to SHADO's medical laboratory for analysis. The effects of Earth's atmosphere cause the alien to revert to his true age and die. Following an autopsy, SHADO discover that the alien has numerous organ transplants harvested from humans. It transpires that the alien's heart comes from Carlin's sister, who disappeared in the incident shown at the beginning.

== Production ==
Looking at the pilot of UFO, it does have a much slower pace than films that are made today, but equally it still has a lot going for it. It was really quite a complicated show to make. It has a lot of production value.

— Gerry Anderson (2002)

In late 1968, Gerry and Sylvia Anderson began working with producer Reg Hill and writers Donald James and Tony Barwick to develop the format for the series and its first episode. The script for "Identified" was completed in January 1969, with James uncredited for his contributions.

Originally, Earth's defence organisation was called Unidentified Foe Defence Organisation (UFoeDO) and was not a secret operation like SHADO. UFoeDO was led by Commander Straeker (later changed to Straker), with Ed Bishop cast in the role. Second in command was Alex (later renamed Alec) Freeman, played by George Sewell. Bishop and Sewell both appeared in the Andersons' 1969 film Doppelgänger. The captain of SkyDiver, Jon Karlin, was originally to be played by Jon Kelley. Before filming commenced, the part was restructured and offered to dancer Peter Gordeno, and the character's name changed to Peter Carlin. Kelley was re-cast as SkyDiver navigator John Masters.

After a five-month pre-production, principal photography began at MGM-British Studios on 28 April 1969 with Gerry Anderson directing. Location filming was conducted at Black Park, Burnham Beeches and Radlett Aerodrome, as well as Neptune House at ATV Elstree Studios. The first of these locations appears in the opening scene, in which Carlin and his sister Leila (Edwina Carroll) discover a UFO and are shot at by an alien. The second was used to film the attack on Straker and Henderson's car, while the fourth appears as the administration block of Harlington-Straker Studios. Various SHADO members were filmed arriving at this building.

In the role of Moonbase commander Franco Desica was Italian actor Franco De Rosa. Three days into the filming, De Rosa was fired for causing delays and his character was dropped from the series. Some of his dialogue was repurposed to create a new, female Moonbase commander, Lieutenant Gay Ellis (originally Paula Harris), portrayed by Gabrielle Drake.

According to the script, the scenes set in 1980 take place on 23 June. However, Colonel Lake is shown reading a newspaper dated 24 August.

== Broadcast ==
The episode first aired on 14 September 1970 on CTV in Canada. In the UK, it was first broadcast on 16 September by the ATV, Border and Tyne Tees franchises of the ITV network. It drew ATV's tenth-highest viewing figure for that week, with 36 ratings points.

== Reception ==
Rating it the tenth-best episode of UFO, review website The Anorak Zone described "Identified" as "not a particularly striking introduction to the [series'] concept". It criticised certain scenes, finding them sexist in their writing or direction. It argued that the episode "can be appreciated on repeat viewings".

John Kenneth Muir called the episode "a fascinating entrance to the world of UFO" for its introduction of Straker, the alien enemy, and the "many diverse facets" of SHADO. He commented that "[w]e get a strong sense of [Straker's] mettle, right out the gate", and described Straker's theorising about the aliens as "riveting" and "well acted". Although he considered the Moonbase's majority-female command crew "a great move for gender equality", he noted that these characters are made to wear "form-fitting breakaway spacesuits", and at one point Lieutenant Gay Ellis (Gabrielle Drake) is shown "stripping down" to her undergarments.

According to Peter Hutchings of Northumbria University, "[t]he sexual politics of the episode are, especially from today's perspective, both striking and problematic." He observed that Ellis and other women are framed as "sexual objects" by both the male characters and "voyeuristically" filmed scenes that show female characters in states of undress. He added that the "sexually predatory" characterisations and "extremes of voyeurism" were toned down in later episodes.
