= Gary Myers (actor) =

British actor (born 1941)

- Born: 22 July 1941; Perth, Australia
- Occupation(s): Actor and model
- Years active: 1968–1980s

Gary Myers (born 22 July 1941) is an Australian model and actor. Born in Perth, he is best known as the original "Milk Tray Man" action hero in the long-running television advertisements for Cadbury's Milk Tray, a role he played from 1968 to 1984. He appeared in either 11 or 13 Milk Tray advertisements, one of which was filmed at Blue Grotto in Malta.

Formerly a physical training instructor in the Australian Army, Myers worked a succession of jobs in several countries before moving to London, where he modelled and trained as an actor. Around 1969, TV producer Sylvia Anderson cast him as SHADO Interceptor pilot Lew Waterman in UFO. He later replaced the outgoing Peter Gordeno (Captain Carlin) as commander of the Skydiver flying submarine. In all, Myers appeared in 13 of UFO's 26 episodes.

He returned to Australia in the 1980s.
