= Norma Ronald =

British actress (1930s–1993)

- Born: 1937 or 1938; Newcastle upon Tyne, UK
- Died: 1993 (aged 55)
- Occupation: Actress
- Years active: 1950s–1989
- Spouse: Edward Judd (married 1966)
- Children: 2

Norma Ronald (1937/1938 – 1993) was a British radio and television actress. She was chiefly known for her roles as Mildred Murfin in the BBC radio comedy series The Men from the Ministry (between 1962 and 1977); as secretary Kay Lingard in the TV dramas The Plane Makers and The Power Game (between 1963 and 1969); and as Colonel Ed Straker's secretary Miss Ealand in the science fiction TV series UFO (1970–1971).

== Career ==
Born in Newcastle upon Tyne, Ronald began acting in repertory theatre during her teens and went on to appear at venues including Croydon's Ashcroft Theatre. She had an uncredited role in the 1969 film Doppelgänger (also known as Journey to the Far Side of the Sun). She appeared on The Frankie Howerd Show on 2 November 1975, and later in Tony's, a 1979–1981 BBC radio comedy with Victor Spinetti, set in an Italian hairdressers.

Ronald's other radio credits included the soap opera Waggoners' Walk (in the role of Bella Attwood, from 1971 to 1980), as well as Afternoon Theatre, sketch show The News Huddlines and sitcom Know Your Place. Her other television appearances included Star Parade, the sitcom Solo, and the drama Chocky.

== Personal life ==
She was married to fellow actor Edward Judd, with whom she had two daughters. In later life, she volunteered with the Terrence Higgins Trust. She died in 1993 at the age of 55.

== Filmography ==
Year	Title	Role	Notes
1969	Doppelgänger	Pam Kirby, Jason Webb's Secretary	Uncredited
