= Peter Gordeno =

British dancer and singer (1939–2008)

- Born: June 20, 1939; Rangoon, Burma
- Origin: England
- Died: October 18, 2008 (aged 69)
- Occupations: Dancer, Recording artist, Cabaret singer, Choreographer, and Occasional actor

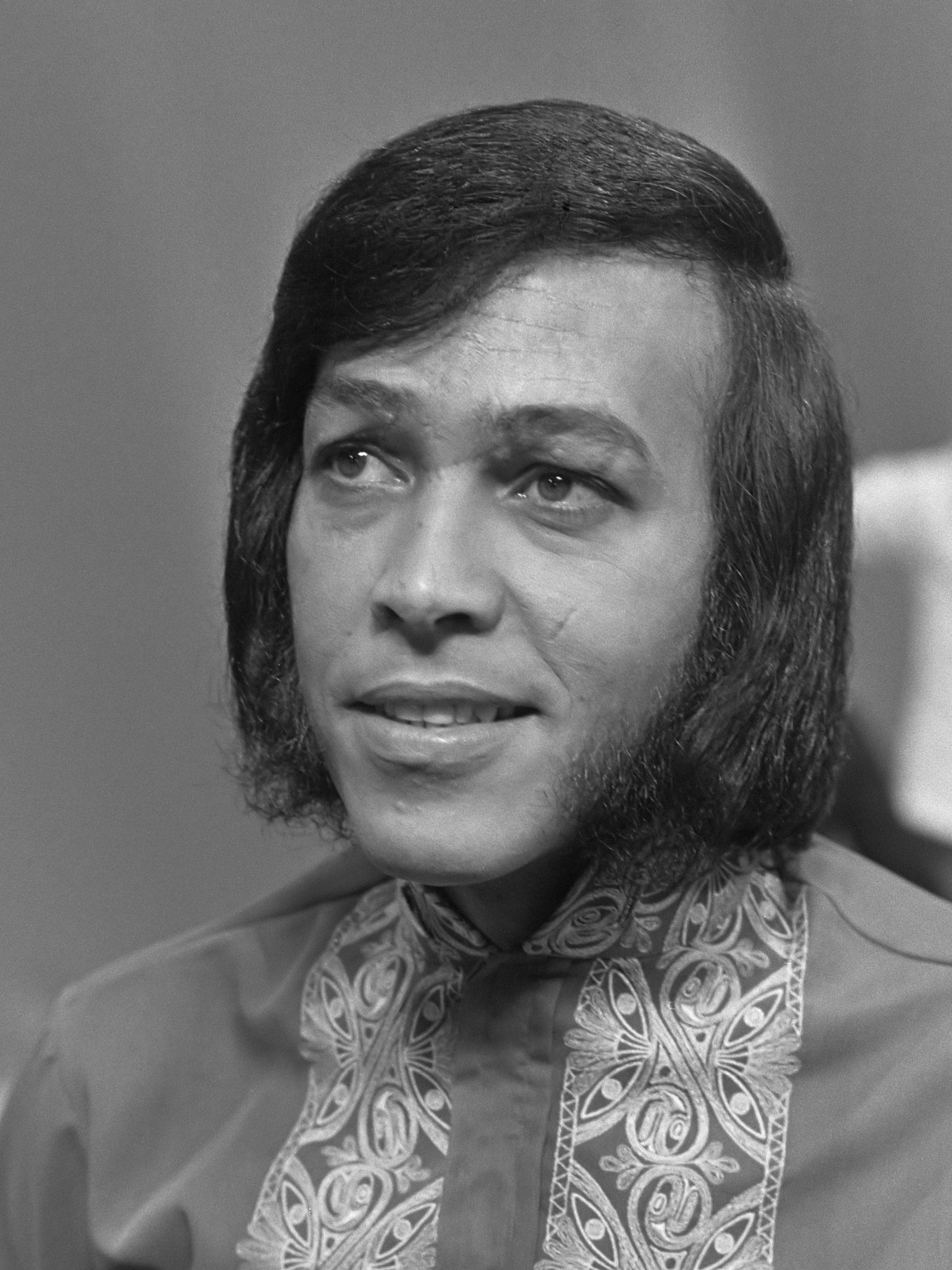
Peter Gordeno (1971)

Peter Gordeno (20 June 1939 – 18 October 2008) was a British dancer, recording artist, cabaret singer, choreographer, and occasional actor.

== Biography ==
Born as Peter Godenho in Rangoon, Burma, to an Italian American father and Scottish/Burmese mother, Gordeno was known primarily for his work with composer and arranger John Barry, but also became a household name in the 1970s due to his appearances as a submarine captain and combat pilot Peter Carlin in the Gerry Anderson television programme UFO. He appeared in the 1968 London stage production of Man of La Mancha, as Anselmo, a muleteer. In the show, he was the soloist in the song "Little Bird, Little Bird". He also appeared in the films Secrets of a Windmill Girl (1966), The Touchables (1968), The Urge to Kill (1989), and briefly in the very last Carry On film (Carry On Columbus) in 1992, whilst also working on the choreography for the film.

Gordeno also hosted the various television broadcasts of the EMI UK & World Disco Dancing & Freestyle Championships between 1979 and 1981, performing personally during the introduction sections.

He died on 18 October 2008, aged 69, in London, after suffering from cancer for several years.

His son, also called Peter Gordeno, is a songwriter and producer, who has toured with Depeche Mode since 1998.
