= Michael Billington (actor) =

British actor (1941–2005)

- Born: 24 December 1941; Blackburn, Lancashire, England
- Died: 3 June 2005 (aged 63); Margate, Kent, England
- Years active: 1965-1993
- Spouse(s): Katherine Kristoff, 1988-1998
- Children: 1 (Micheal)

Michael Billington (24 December 1941 – 3 June 2005) was a British film and television actor. He was born in Blackburn, Lancashire, England.

== Career ==
In 1966 Billington appeared in Incident at Vichy at the Phoenix Theatre in London.

=== Television ===
He was best known for his role as Colonel Paul Foster in the 1970 science fiction TV series UFO; being chosen by Sylvia Anderson after she saw him in A Change of Mind on The Prisoner.

He created the character of Daniel Fogarty from 1971 to 1974 in the historical drama The Onedin Line. He also appeared as Sergeant Jacko Jackson of the Royal Wessex Rangers in the series Spearhead and as Czar Nicholas II in the ITV drama series Edward the Seventh (1975). He played gangster John Coogan in one episode ("The Rack") of The Professionals.

Billington lived in the U.S. from around 1979 until 1985. Although he had some good roles, notably as Count Louis Dardinay in The Quest (1982), he did not reach the same level of success as he had in Britain. Billington's last major TV role came in the 1986 BBC drama The Collectors, but his final appearance was in an episode of early 1990s TV series Maigret as a villain.

=== Film ===
His other film credits included Alfred the Great (1969) and KGB: The Secret War (1985).

=== 007 ===
He was screen-tested for the role of James Bond more than any other actor, and was said to have been Albert R. Broccoli's first choice had Roger Moore not been available (see: 1981's For Your Eyes Only). Billington did a photo shoot for On Her Majesty's Secret Service (1969), and met the film's director Peter Hunt. He was also screen-tested for Live and Let Die (1973), Moonraker (1979) and Octopussy (1983). His one Bond screen appearance was in the pre-title sequence of 1977's The Spy Who Loved Me, playing Agent XXX's ill-fated lover, Sergei Barsov.

== Personal life and death ==
He was the partner of Barbara Broccoli, daughter of the Bond producer Albert "Cubby" Broccoli, for eight years.

Billington was married to Katherine Kristoff (1956–1998) from 1988 to 1998. They had a son, Michael.

Michael Billington died of cancer on 3 June 2005, at the age of 63, just five days before his fellow actor on UFO, Ed Bishop.

== Filmography ==
| Year | Title | Role | Notes |
|---|---|---|---|
| 1965 | Dream A40 | Young Man | |
| 1967 | The Prisoner | Woodland Man | episode: A Change of Mind |
| 1969 | Alfred the Great | Offa | |
| 1971 | Hadleigh | Freddie Hepton | episode: Absolutely Feudal |
| 1972 | The Onedin Line | Daniel Fogarty | TV series, Season one |
| 1970–1973 | UFO | Colonel Paul Foster | TV series, 21 episodes |
| 1974 | Invasion: UFO | Colonel Paul Foster | |
| 1975 | Edward the Seventh | Czar Nicholas II | TV series, 3 episodes |
| 1977 | The Spy Who Loved Me | KGB Agent Sergei Barsov | |
| 1982 | The Quest | Count Louis Dardinay | TV series, 9 episodes |
| 1985 | KGB: The Secret War | Peter Hubbard | |
| 1986 | The Collectors | | TV series |
| 1987 | Flicks | Deputy Inspector | segment: "Whodunit" |
| 1993 | Maigret | Oscar | segment: “Maigret and the Night Club Dancer” |
