= Dolores Mantez =

English actress (1936–2012)

- Mantez in UFO (1970)
- Born: Dolores Brenda Mantey; 1937 or 1938; Liverpool, England
- Died: 30 November 2012 (aged 74); St Christopher's Hospice, Sydenham, London
- Other name: Dolores B. Harding (married name)
- Occupations: Actress; singer
- Years active: 1959–1970s
- Notable credit: Lieutenant Nina Barry in UFO
- Spouse: Robert Harding (m. 1976; died 1999)
- Children: 1

Dolores Brenda Harding (née Mantey; 1936 – 30 November 2012), known professionally as Dolores Mantez, was an English actress of the 1960s and early 1970s, best known for her appearances in Gerry Anderson's science fiction TV series UFO.

== Life and career ==
Dolores Brenda Mantey was born in Liverpool in 1936 to a Ghanaian father, Edward Mantey, and a Liverpool mother from an Irish background, Susan Margaret O'Fallon. She changed her birth surname of "Mantey" by one letter and initially followed a career as a seamstress in a dress shop. She then started to sing semi-professionally, an occupation that became a full-time job when she joined a group that appeared in cabaret. However, while she was visiting her agent, she happened to meet an actor's agent who believed that her exotic physical appearance was exactly what was needed for a role as a student in Sapphire (1959), a film about the emerging Afro-Caribbean community in England. At the time, Mantez had no acting experience, but her work on the film resulted in a succession of parts in television series such as Shadow Squad and The Avengers. She also played a small role as a nurse in the film The Angry Silence (1960) starring Richard Attenborough.

Mantez's acting career was boosted with a role as a nurse in the film Life for Ruth (1962), co-starring Patrick McGoohan. This in turn led to appearances in two episodes of the TV series Danger Man, first as an agent working with John Drake in "Loyalty Always Pays", and then as a West Indian woman in "The Man on the Beach". She appeared as artist Rita Bell in an episode of the ABC series The Human Jungle ("The Twenty-Four Hour Man", 1964). Another of Mantez's roles was as Happy Lee, the girl suspected of Marty Hopkirk's murder in the pilot episode of the ITC series Randall and Hopkirk (Deceased) ("My Late Lamented Friend and Partner", 1969). During the 1960s, Mantez appeared in a number of stage musicals; these included Cowardy Custard (the Mermaid Theatre's tribute to Noël Coward), Monty Norman's The Perils of Scobie Prilt, and the West End production of Every Other Evening (starring Margaret Lockwood). She toured Europe, once appearing in Porgy And Bess in East Berlin. She may be best known for her portrayal of Lieutenant Nina Barry (frequently sporting a purple wig, as did all female staff on Moonbase) in the science-fiction TV series UFO, broadcast in 1970 and 1971. Her final acting role was as Indigo Jones, a mixed-race lady of means, in an episode of the BBC series The Onedin Line ("Fetch and Carry", 1972).

== Personal life ==
In the mid-1970s, Mantez met businessman Robert Harding in a pub. They married in 1976 and resided in Croydon. After their son was born, Mantez gave up acting. She died of cancer at St Christopher's Hospice in Sydenham, London on 30 November 2012, aged 74. She was cremated at Croydon Crematorium.

== Filmography ==
Year	Title	Role	Notes
1959	Sapphire	Uncredited	
1960	ITV Play of the Week	Rosa	TV Series
1960	ITV Television Playhouse	The Singer	TV Series
1960	The Angry Silence	Nurse	
1960–1968	Armchair Theatre	Willy / Gloria Oliver	TV Series, 2 Episodes
1961	The Avengers	Judith	TV Series
1961	Hurricane	Jessica de Boissière	TV Series, 4 Episodes
1964	The Human Jungle	Rita	TV Series
1965	Danger Man	Mary Ann / Miss Sefadu	TV Series, 2 Episodes
1966	United!	Caroline Hillarette	TV Series, 2 Episodes
1967	Rainbow City	Schoolteacher	TV Series
1967	Z Cars	Singer	TV Series
1968	ITV Playhouse	Carey Ford	TV Series
1969	Randall and Hopkirk (Deceased)	Happy Lee	TV Series
1970	Ryan International	Marie	TV Series
1970–1971	UFO	Nina Barry	TV Series, 23 Episodes
1972	The Onedin Line	Miss Indigo	TV Series
