= See You Down There =

- Joe 90 episode
- Episode no.: Episode 29
- Directed by: Leo Eaton
- Written by: Tony Barwick
- Cinematography by: Julien Lugrin
- Editing by: Norman A. Cole
- Production code: 28
- Original air date: 9 February 1969

Guest character voices
- Keith Alexander as Stewart, Doorman & TV Narrator; Gary Files as Jim Molineaux & Harris; Jeremy Wilkin as Ralph Clayton

Episode chronology
← Previous "Test Flight"	Next → "The Birthday"

"See You Down There" is an episode of Joe 90, a British Supermarionation television series created by Gerry and Sylvia Anderson and filmed by their production company Century 21 for ITC Entertainment. Written by Tony Barwick and directed by Leo Eaton, it was first broadcast on 9 February 1969 on Tyne Tees Television. It was shown on Anglia Television on 23 February and later on Associated, Channel, Ulster and Westward on 2 March 1969.

Set in the future, the series follows the adventures of nine-year-old schoolboy Joe McClaine, who becomes the "Most Special Agent" of a global spy organisation, the World Intelligence Network (WIN). Aided by his adoptive father Professor "Mac" McClaine's invention – the Brain Impulse Galvanoscope Record And Transfer (BIG RAT), a device capable of recording the knowledge and experience of a human brain and transferring it to another – Joe assumes the brain patterns of leading experts to carry out missions for WIN, his youth and innocence helping him to infiltrate dangerous situations without raising enemy suspicion. In "See You Down There", Joe and WIN use unorthodox methods to confront an unscrupulous businessman whose activities threaten one of WIN's suppliers.

== Plot ==
At the offices of Clayton Enterprises in London, chairman Ralph Clayton dismisses Harris, the owner of Leto Machine Tools – a company Clayton is in the process of acquiring. Sneaking in, Joe 90 learns how Clayton uses market manipulation to absorb smaller businesses and expand his own. WIN controller Shane Weston is determined to put a stop to Clayton, especially since Leto Tools is one of WIN's suppliers. However, as Clayton is not breaking the law, WIN must resort to unusual tactics.

Posing as a new office assistant, Mac tells Clayton his tea was drugged with a hallucinogen, the antidote for which will be given only when Clayton cancels the Leto Tools acquisition. Clayton does not believe Mac and has him thrown out. Early the next morning, the McClaines begin making daily visits to Clayton's mansion. Joe has been given the brain pattern of a trumpet player and unceremoniously wakes Clayton with a collection of loud tunes. The McClaines bid Clayton farewell with the words "see you down there," accompanied by a ring gesture. Clayton gets security gates fitted to his driveway, but the following morning, the McClaines simply hop over the gates in Mac's flying car. Mac re-wires the doorbell to blare out the Westminster Quarters while Joe flies around the premises in a jet pack.

After complaining to the police, Clayton confides in board members Stewart and Evans, who do not believe his story about a flying boy musician. Clayton denies hallucinating, insisting the McClaines are playing tricks and reassuring himself that the police will investigate. In fact, the authorities are cooperating with WIN. The only lawmen to respond are Weston and WIN agent Sam Loover – the first in exaggerated secret agent attire, claiming to be Mac's replacement; the second wearing a dry suit, identifying himself as the river police.

With the brain pattern of an impressionist, Joe telephones Stewart and Evans in Clayton's voice and orders them to a fancy dress party at the mansion. Clayton is furious and accuses his colleagues of conspiring with WIN. Fearing for Clayton's health, the board members have called for a doctor – prompting Weston to arrive dressed as a surgeon. Later, Clayton is horrified when his television viewing is interrupted by a fake news bulletin in which Joe, still mimicking Clayton, lectures on ways to monopolise industry. Unknown to Clayton, Weston concealed a jamming device in his living room.

Now suffering from nightmares, Clayton finally accepts that he was drugged. On their next visit, the McClaines obtain Clayton's written agreement to abandon his next takeover and compensate his past victims. Presenting a bag of jelly babies instead of an antidote, Mac tells Clayton there was no hallucinogen; all he experienced was a campaign of practical jokes designed to exploit his deceitful nature and bring out his better side. Enlightened, Clayton begins his first day's work as an honest businessman.

== Regular voice cast ==
- Keith Alexander as Sam Loover
- Rupert Davies as Professor Ian "Mac" McClaine
- Len Jones as Joe McClaine
- David Healy as Shane Weston

== Production ==
The episode was filmed between 16 and 31 July 1968 on Stage 3 of Century 21's studios on the Slough Trading Estate.

In the original script, the name of Harris's company was Seto Machine Tools. The script called for Shane Weston's characterisation to emulate Joe Friday during the scene in which Weston introduces himself to Clayton as his supposed new assistant.

The puppet that played Clayton was originally Colonel White in Captain Scarlet and the Mysterons, modified for its appearance in this episode with a new dark wig of hair and moustache. This was the puppet's third outing in Joe 90, following appearances as Dr Loover in "Relative Danger" and Sir George Harris in "Trial at Sea".

A prop comic book seen being read by Joe at the start of the episode features a miniature reproduction of the front cover of TV21 (issue 183, dated July 1968), published by Century 21 Productions' sister company Century 21 Publishing. The set of Clayton's living room contained furniture and other props originally built for Thunderbirds and its second film sequel, Thunderbird 6.

During editing, changes were made to the order of the opening scenes, as well as some of their action and dialogue. As scripted, Joe's infiltration of Clayton Enterprises was to be a cold open, but the idea of a teaser sequence was later abandoned, and the scenes with Joe were moved back: the finished episode begins with the title sequence, followed by the meeting between Harris and Clayton. Harris's appearance was originally part of the scene (set after the briefing at WIN headquarters) in which Mac arrives as Clayton's new assistant, but this was ultimately split into two scenes. A deleted scene had Sam Loover appear at Clayton Enterprises as yet another assistant, replacing Mac and Weston.

The incidental music that accompanies Clayton's TV programme was an archive track composed for Supercar. Joe's trumpet tunes were performed by jazz musician Tommy McQuater and recorded at Cine-Tele Sound (CTS) Studios in Bayswater on 27 September 1968.

== Reception ==
Stephen La Rivière, describing the plot of "See You Down There" in his book Filmed in Supermarionation, sums up the episode as "downright bizarre". In a review for FAB magazine, Ian Fryer compared the style to later Supermarionation series The Secret Service, writing that it marked a progression from "The Unorthodox Shepherd" in representing "an early flowering [...] of the whimsy" which would become that series' "defining feature".

The expression "See you down there" and its associated OK sign have been interpreted as an imitation of "Be seeing you", a farewell used by characters in The Prisoner (1967–1968). The hand gesture was not scripted. Asked during an interview whether he thought the episode's style was influenced by that series, director Leo Eaton replied "not consciously", though he added that The Prisoner was "so influential" at the time "See You Down There" was made. He described the episode as "[a lot of] fun" but also said that, as it "wasn't a big bang-bang-blow-'em-up [episode]", it was not very successful.

Andrew Shenton compares "See You Down There" to The Prisoner episode "Hammer into Anvil" (1967) and Yes, Prime Minister's "Man Overboard" (1987), noting that all three episodes are darkly or overtly comic and feature characters who use trickery to subvert a public figure and "effect a return to normality". He notes that while the meaning of The Prisoner's "Be seeing you" is left vague, "See you down there" is explicitly defined: at the end of the episode, Mac tells Clayton that WIN's objective is to see him "on [his] hands and knees, for all the little men [he's] crushed."
