= Hi-jacked (Joe 90) =

- Joe 90 episode
- Episode no.: Episode 2
- Directed by: Alan Perry
- Written by: Tony Barwick
- Cinematography by: Paddy Seale
- Editing by: Bob Dearberg
- Production code: 2
- Original air date: 20 October 1968

Guest character voices
- Keith Alexander as Gregson & Radio Operator; David Healy as Mario Colletti & Police Radio Operator; Martin King as Ed Johnson, Davis, Carter & Police Officer

Episode chronology
| ← Previous "The Most Special Agent" | Next → "Splashdown" |

"Hi-jacked" is the second episode of Joe 90, a British Supermarionation television series created by Gerry and Sylvia Anderson and filmed by their production company Century 21 for ITC Entertainment. Written by Tony Barwick and directed by Alan Perry, it was first broadcast on 20 October 1968 on Associated Television and Tyne Tees Television.

Set in the future, the series follows the adventures of nine-year-old schoolboy Joe McClaine, who becomes the "Most Special Agent" of the World Intelligence Network (WIN). With the help of the Brain Impulse Galvanoscope Record And Transfer (BIG RAT), a mind uploading device created by his adoptive father Professor "Mac" McClaine, Joe assumes the knowledge and experience of leading experts to carry out dangerous spy missions for WIN, his youth and innocence helping him to avoid raising enemy suspicion.

In "Hi-jacked", Joe is given his first mission: tracking down an arms smuggler. The clip show series finale, "The Birthday", includes a flashback to "Hi-jacked".

== Plot ==
In an empty backstreet, WIN agent Sam Loover finds fellow agent Ed Johnson bleeding to death from a gunshot wound. An ambulance arrives and Johnson is rushed to hospital with Sam in pursuit. Telephoning the McClaine cottage, Sam asks Mac and Joe to join him at the hospital with a portable transmitter, which enables them to record Johnson's brain pattern and relay it to the BIG RAT. An entry on Johnson's concealed voice recorder reveals that arms trafficker Mario Colletti is in England and plans to hijack a consignment of submachine guns. Concluding that Johnson must have blown his cover, Sam gives Joe his unfinished assignment: to discover the location of Colletti's hideout.

Equipped with Johnson's brain pattern, a transceiver and a handgun, Joe infiltrates the Hudson Armaments Factory and stows away inside a gun crate – one of many that is about to be shipped out by lorry. Unknown to the authorities, Colletti's henchmen have set an ambush on a nearby lane. They machine-gun the police car escorting the lorry, then block the road, causing both the car and the lorry to crash. Transferring the crates to their vans, the criminals drive to a barn concealing the entrance to Colletti's underground arms warehouse.

Leaving his crate, Joe accidentally trips a motion sensor and is apprehended by two men called Gregson and Davis, who bring him to Colletti. Amused by the young intruder, Colletti tells Gregson to drive Joe home, before changing his mind and ordering the boy killed. Locked in the boot of a car, Joe radios Mac and Sam to report his situation. Stopping on a ridge road, Gregson gets out of the car and sends it over the edge, leaving it to crash down the hillside.

Mac and Sam, who have been using a homing device to track Joe, reach the scene only for police to inform them that no bodies have been found – for Joe managed to open the boot from inside and make his escape. Returning to the warehouse, Joe confronts Colletti and a firefight ensues. Joe loses his gun but stumbles across a box of grenades and hurls one at Colletti, killing him in the blast. A fire breaks out and Joe is overcome by the smoke, but not before opening the barn door to let Mac and Sam inside. Joe is rescued and all three escape the hideout moments before it is destroyed in a chain reaction. At the cottage, Sam announces that Colletti's men have been arrested. Mac briefs Joe on his next assignment: a bath and straight to bed.

== Regular voice cast ==
- Keith Alexander as Sam Loover
- Rupert Davies as Professor Ian "Mac" McClaine
- Len Jones as Joe McClaine

== Production ==
In an early version of the script, Colletti's first name was Andre. The episode was shot on Stage 3 at Century 21's studios on the Slough Trading Estate. Filming began on either 27 or 28 November 1967 and continued well into December.

The opening street scene uses props that first appeared in the title sequence of Captain Scarlet and the Mysterons, as well as miniature model buildings that were originally built for that series' third episode, "Big Ben Strikes Again". The model serving as the Hudson Armaments lorry was also adapted from an earlier appearance in "Big Ben Strikes Again". Johnson's hospital bed and a truck inside the arms warehouse were originally built for "Treble Cross".

According to the plot synopsis in the ITC Story Information Book, Agent Johnson is killed in the line of duty. However, for the McClaines and Loover to copy his brain impulses, he must still be alive.

=== Music ===
Incidental music was recorded at Cine-Tele Sound (CTS) Studios in Bayswater on 16 February 1968. Twenty-six instrumentalists attended the studio session, during which music for the episode "Operation McClaine" was also recorded. The official soundtrack release includes two distinct pieces from the episode, running to a combined eight-and-a-half minutes: "Mission Tango 120" and "Showdown at Colletti's Hideout".

In 1968, Pye Records released a 45 rpm disc called Title Theme from the ATV Series Joe 90 featuring a new version of the incidental music. This had been recorded at CTS Studios on 3 October 1968. The incidental music's popularity has prompted a number of re-releases on other albums, namely: No Strings Attached (1981), TV Classics, Volume One/Two (1993), Top TV Themes (1993), The Cult Files Re-Opened (1997), Thunderbirds & Other Top Sixties TV Themes, Volume 2 (1999), Battlestar Galactica: The A to Z of Fantasy TV Themes (1999), 100 Greatest TV Themes (2002) and Stand By For Action: the Music of Barry Gray (2009).

== Broadcast ==
On its first broadcast, "Hi-jacked" was seen by an audience of 1.5 million. This was the highest viewing figure for any Joe 90 episode up to that point. For a repeat on Children's BBC in 1994, part of Colletti's death scene was cut due to its level of violence.

Though the second episode to be produced, "Hi-jacked" was originally transmitted on ATV and Tyne Tees as the fourth episode. When the regular characters reminisce about past events in "The Birthday", it is stated that the Colletti assignment was Joe's first mission as a WIN agent, indicating that "Hi-jacked" follows on directly from the first episode.

== Reception ==
Commentator Ian Fryer regards "Hi-jacked" as a "key episode" of the series, writing that its story "[represented] the Joe 90 format at its most basic" but served as an ideal template for later episodes. He adds that the episode "sees all aspects of the Joe 90 production working at their absolute peak", praising elements like the opening scene's use of zooming close-ups and footstep sound effects to imply motion while bypassing the puppets' lack of articulation; the design of Colletti's hideout (including the "Charles and Ray Eames"-style chair that Colletti sits in); and Rupert Davies' emotive voice acting during the scene in which Mac and Sam look for Joe in the burning ruins. He argues that compared to some other episodes, "Hi-jacked" is more inventive in its use of Joe, noting the character's entry to the hideout by hiding in a crate. He describes Colletti as a "nasty piece of work" who "gives the story some edge", also pointing out the violent nature of his death at the hands of the boy protagonist.
