= The Unorthodox Shepherd =

- Joe 90 episode
- Episode no.: Episode 8
- Directed by: Ken Turner
- Written by: Tony Barwick
- Cinematography by: Paddy Seale
- Editing by: Harry MacDonald
- Production code: 8
- Original air date: 22 December 1968

Guest character voices
- Gary Files as the Reverend Shepherd and PC Lewis; David Healy as Kline; Martin King as Mason

Episode chronology
← Previous "Relative Danger"	Next → "King for a Day"

"The Unorthodox Shepherd" is the eighth episode of Joe 90, a British Supermarionation television series created by Gerry and Sylvia Anderson and filmed by their production company Century 21 for ITC Entertainment. Written by Tony Barwick and directed by Ken Turner, it was first broadcast on 22 December 1968 on Anglia, Associated and Ulster Television.

Set in the future, the series follows the adventures of nine-year-old schoolboy Joe McClaine, who becomes the "Most Special Agent" of the World Intelligence Network (WIN). With the help of the Brain Impulse Galvanoscope Record And Transfer (BIG RAT), a mind uploading device created by his adoptive father Professor "Mac" McClaine, Joe assumes the knowledge and experience of leading experts to carry out dangerous spy missions for WIN, his youth and innocence helping him to avoid raising enemy suspicion.

In the Christmas-themed "The Unorthodox Shepherd", the McClaines investigate a money forgery case which leads them to an unusual suspect – an elderly church vicar. The episode was filmed partly on location in Harefield in one of Century 21's first major location shoots. Its intercutting of scale puppet scenes with live-action location footage influenced the format of the company's final puppet series, The Secret Service, which made extensive use of live actors.

"The Unorthodox Shepherd" has received a mixed to favourable response from commentators. The Joe 90 Region 1 DVD box set by A&E Home Video includes an audio commentary on the episode by director Ken Turner.

== Plot ==
The episode is set a week before Christmas. WIN has traced a series of forged United States dollar bills to an unlikely source – the Reverend Joseph Shepherd, vicar of St David's Church. Professor McClaine, Joe 90 and Sam Loover (voiced by Rupert Davies, Len Jones and Keith Alexander) are assigned to investigate and travel to the Reverend's village. Equipped with the brain pattern of a World Bank vice president, Joe determines that all of the bills have been printed recently even though the plates were destroyed in a fire many years ago.

The trio confront the Reverend at his vicarage. Though apparently half-deaf, Shepherd amazes the WIN agents by identifying the make of Loover's handgun merely from the click of its safety catch. He admits that his deafness is an act and that the plates were not destroyed: a pair of criminals, Kline and Mason, have brought them to England and are using them to print $6 million in counterfeit bills. The plates were smuggled into the country inside the coffin of Mason's uncle, Clem Mason – known to the intelligence community as notorious racketeer Carlo Masoni – who was born in the village and wished to be buried there. Kline and Mason's hideout is on the church grounds in the crypt beneath Clem's tomb. To protect the counterfeiting operation, Mason has planted electronic devices inside the church to make its bells ring at odd hours, leading the villagers to think that the church is haunted and stay away from the area. The counterfeiters have also taken the verger, Thomas, hostage and have threatened to kill him if Shepherd betrays them to the authorities. Desperate for money to save St David's from dry rot, Shepherd had no choice but to agree and has been using his feigned deafness as a way of deflecting attention.

Sam comes up with a plan to apprehend the counterfeiters by using Mason's fears against him. That night, Mason and Kline are nearing their $6 million target and Mason has removed all his gadgets from the church ahead of their getaway. Yet the counterfeiters' surprise, the bells ring out once more. Searching for trespassers, Mason is petrified when Sam, hiding in the shadows with a megaphone, announces that he is the spirit of Carlo Masoni and that an angel is coming to avenge his "desecrated" memory. With Thomas at gunpoint, Kline and Mason come out of the crypt to meet the angel. Joe, wearing a jet pack underneath white robes, flies towards Kline and Mason. As Mason tries to flee, Kline fires wildly at Joe until the boy knocks him down. Thomas is rescued and Police Constable Lewis arrests the counterfeiters.

Several days later, a white Christmas has arrived. For helping to recover the stolen plates, WIN and Interpol have given Shepherd a combined reward of £10,000 – enough for him to fully restore St David's. The episode ends with shots of the snow-covered fields around the village, accompanied by Shepherd's congregation singing "Hark! The Herald Angels Sing".

== Production ==
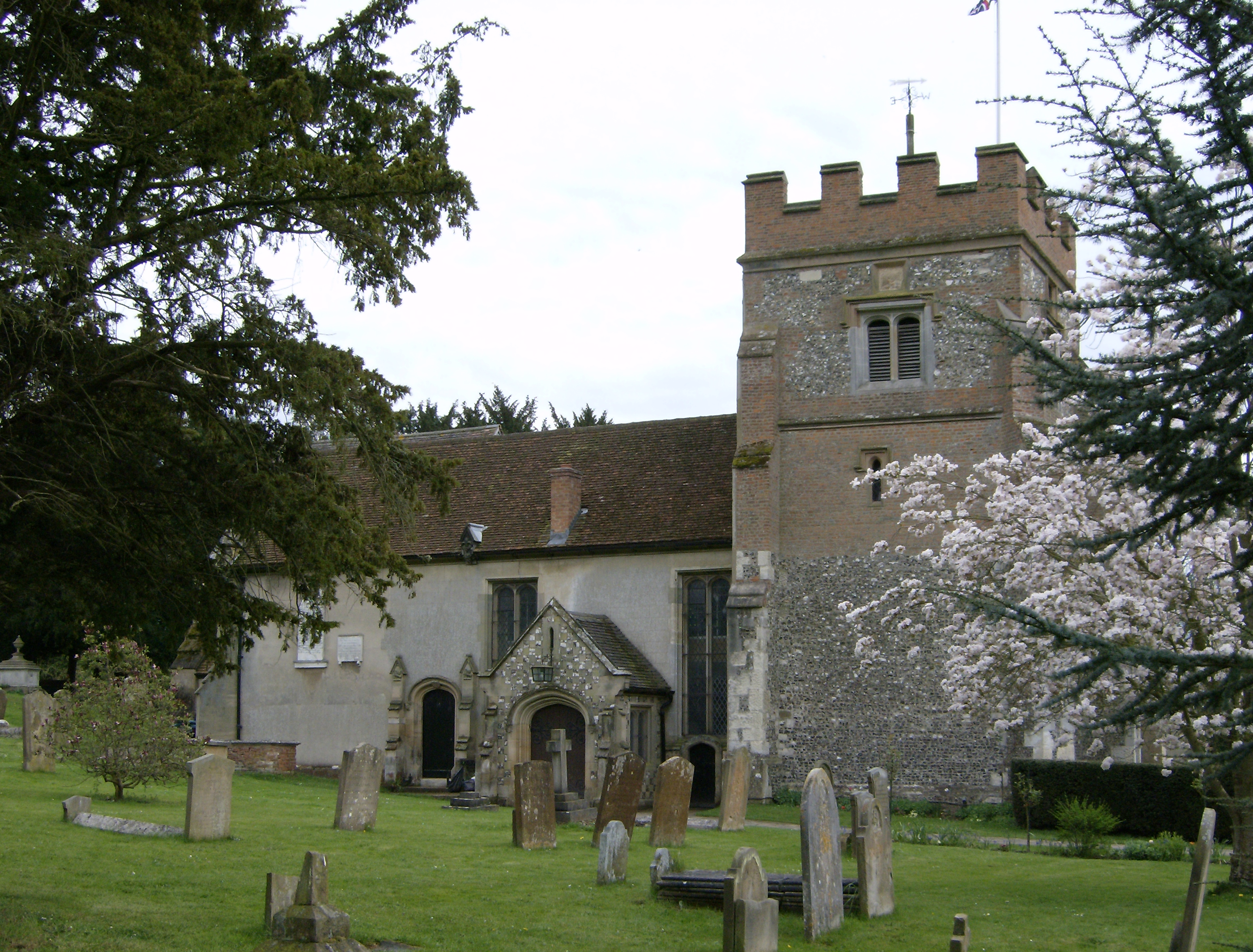
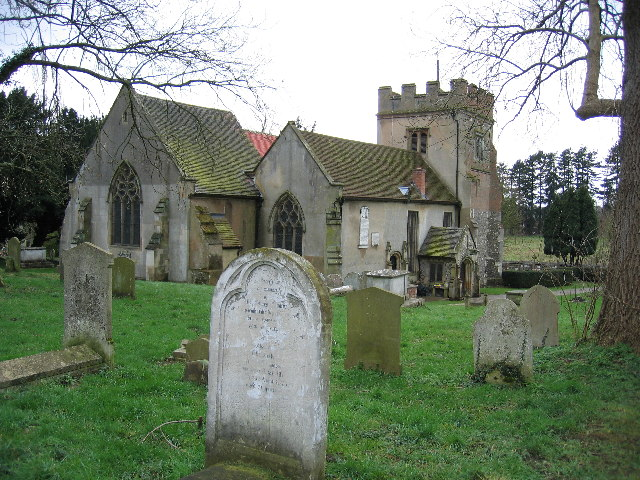
The episode uses extensive location footage of the Church of St Mary the Virgin in Harefield (photographed here in the 2000s).

The episode is set in December and according to character dialogue it has been 17 years since Clem Mason's death. Mason's gravestone gives his year of death as 1996, dating the events of the episode to December 2013.

According to director Ken Turner, time and budget constraints precluded making an entire church nave in the scale of the puppets. It was therefore decided to minimise the use of puppets for scenes set inside the church and shoot the episode partly on location, with the Church of St Mary the Virgin in Harefield, London Borough of Hillingdon, doubling as the fictional St David's Church. In his DVD audio commentary on the episode, Turner remarked that these methods were "experimental" for Century 21.

Pre-production began in early 1968 when Turner and production designer Keith Wilson travelled to Harefield to conduct a recce of the church and its surroundings. Using photographs from the recce, Wilson built scale reproductions of various interior elements for puppet filming, as well as the model of Clem Mason's tomb, which was based on an actual monument in the churchyard. The crew then went back on location to film inserts in and around the church as well as shots of a human-sized dummy of the younger Mason. (This was the first time that Century 21 had used a life-size mannequin to represent a Supermarionation character.) Although many of the church scenes take place at night, the shots of the building's exterior were filmed during the day as Century 21 could not afford the higher costs of a night-for-night shoot. After a snowfall some weeks later, the crew paid yet another visit to Harefield to film panning shots of the surrounding fields for the episode's closing scene; the crew's footprints can be seen in the snow, and their shadow is just visible, with the director pointing as the camera pans to the sky. Century 21 would return to St Mary's Church in 1969 to film the ending of the UFO episode "The Square Triangle".

The puppet filming was completed between late January and early February 1968 on Stage 3 at Century 21's studios on the Slough Trading Estate. For scenes set inside the church, the characters were filmed in close-up to conceal the fact that the puppet set was only a partial reconstruction; these shots were then intercut with the material that had been filmed on location. A scene that was filmed but later deleted from the episode showed village policeman Constable Lewis arresting Mason and Kline after their run-in with the disguised Joe. The scale model of the vicarage first appeared as General X's mansion in the Thunderbirds episode "Martian Invasion".

The incidental music was recorded over two sessions: organ and harp pieces on 26 March 1968 at composer Barry Gray's private studio, the rest on 10 April at CTS Studio (along with the music for the episode "Big Fish").

== Reception ==
Gerry Anderson biographers Simon Archer and Marcus Hearn regard "The Unorthodox Shepherd" as one of Joe 90's best episodes, stating that it "[explores] the series' unique formula to intriguing effect". Calling it "quaint", Paul Mount of Starburst magazine considers the episode to be one of several that "show a remarkable maturity within the potentially-limited genre in which they're being told." Time Screen magazine's Andrew Pixley describes the episode as "rather above average" but questions the logic of its ending. The title has been criticised by website TV Cream and SFX magazine, the latter ranking it 21st in a list of "worst TV episode titles".

Alasdair Wilkins of io9 writes that "The Unorthodox Shepherd", besides being "bonkers in the way most Joe 90 episodes are", is "one of the oddest Christmas episodes ever made". He believes it to be more innovative than the Christmas-themed offerings of earlier Supermarionation series, such as Thunderbirds' "Give or Take a Million" and Stingray's "A Christmas to Remember", remarking that Joe's use of scare tactics against the armed counterfeiters is a "seriously insane risk to build a plan around". He also describes "The Unorthodox Shepherd" as "one of the more quietly religious Christmas episodes I've seen".

The episode's use of location shooting was well received by the crew, who found the effect convincing. According to Archer and Hearn, the episode demonstrates the "seamless integration" possible in mixing puppets and live actors. They and other commentators regard "The Unorthodox Shepherd" as a stylistic precursor to the final Supermarionation series, The Secret Service, which combined puppet sequences with larger amounts of live action footage in a hybrid format which Archer and Hearn argue "saw Supermarionation through to its natural conclusion." Comparing "The Unorthodox Shepherd" to The Secret Service, Pixley notes the Reverend Shepherd's similarity to Father Unwin, an undercover spy who serves as the protagonist of the later series, pointing out that Shepherd too is a vicar who "isn't all he seems". FAB magazine's Ian Fryer compares it to the finale of The Secret Service, "More Haste Less Speed", writing that both episodes "centre on the production of counterfeit dollar bills in old basements, and feature a vicar who isn't what he seems to be." Fryer adds that "The Unorthodox Shepherd" was one of the Joe 90 episodes that embodied an "early flowering of the whimsy that was to be the defining feature of The Secret Service."
