= List of Joe 90 episodes =

This is the list of episodes of the Gerry Anderson television series Joe 90, filmed by Century 21 Productions for ITC Entertainment and first broadcast between 1968 and 1969 on the ITV network. Episodes are listed in the recommended broadcast order as published by ITC. Air dates are the original broadcast dates on Associated Television unless otherwise stated.

== Main Series (1968–1969) ==
No. in series	Title	Directed by	Written by	Original air date	Prod. code
1	"The Most Special Agent"	Desmond Saunders	Gerry & Sylvia Anderson	29 September 1968	1
Professor Ian "Mac" McClaine completes his work on the revolutionary BIG RAT, to the interest of his friend (and WIN agent) Sam Loover. Introducing the McClaines to WIN, commander-in-chief Shane Weston contrives a mission in which Joe 90 steals a new Russian fighter-bomber to prevent an arms race between the East and West.
2	"Hi-jacked"	Alan Perry	Tony Barwick	20 October 1968	2
Joe attempts to thwart Mario Coletti, a ruthless arms runner who sells weapons to the highest bidders.
3	"Splashdown"	Leo Eaton	Shane Rimmer	24 November 1968	3
Joe must stop the organisation responsible for the kidnapping of two electronics experts before time runs out for him and his father.
4	"International Concerto"	Alan Perry	Tony Barwick	17 November 1968	6
A top WIN agent finds his cover broken. Joe must take on his persona as a famous pianist if the agent is to escape his captors.
5	"Operation McClaine"	Ken Turner	Gerry Anderson & David Lane	6 December 1968 (Harlech)	4
When a specialist neurosurgeon is injured in a plane crash, it is up to Joe to save the life of an ailing novelist.
6	"Big Fish"	Leo Eaton	Shane Rimmer	1 December 1968	7
A submarine has unwittingly malfunctioned in enemy waters and Joe must remove it to prevent political carnage.
7	"Relative Danger"	Peter Anderson	Shane Rimmer	8 December 1968	9
Joe is brained up with the skills of an expert explorer to save three miners endangered by their own explosives test.
8	"The Unorthodox Shepherd"	Ken Turner	Tony Barwick	22 December 1968	8
Joe, Mac and Sam investigate unusual disturbances surrounding a church crypt in the days leading up to Christmas.
9	"King for a Day"	Leo Eaton	Shane Rimmer	10 November 1968	11
Joe poses as the heir to a Middle Eastern throne as WIN tries to rescue the real prince from kidnappers allied with a jealous regent.
10	"Business Holiday"	Alan Perry	Tony Barwick	22 November 1968 (Harlech)	10
Strange happenings during the McClaines' holiday are connected to the need to destroy a rogue government's new military base.
11	"Most Special Astronaut"	Alan Perry	Tony Barwick	6 October 1968	13
Joe ventures into space to save two astronauts stranded on a space station with a failing air supply.
12	"Three's a Crowd"	Peter Anderson	Tony Barwick	19 January 1969	5
Joe intervenes when it seems that there is more to Mac's new girlfriend than meets the eye.
13	"Double Agent"	Ken Turner	Tony Barwick	5 January 1969 (Tyne Tees)	12
Joe is unintentionally given the brain pattern of a double agent for a mission to protect top-secret WIN cipher codes.
14	"Arctic Adventure"	Alan Perry	Tony Barwick	24 November 1968 (Tyne Tees)	14
A nuclear bomb must be discreetly removed from the Arctic wastes of the Eastern Sector to avert a world war.
15	"The Fortress"	Leo Eaton	Shane Rimmer	3 November 1968	15
Joe is assigned to rescue a fellow WIN agent from an impregnable stronghold before his captors force him to divulge classified information.
16	"Project 90"	Peter Anderson	Tony Barwick	13 October 1968	17
Criminal masterminds uncover the McClaines' involvement with WIN and kidnap Mac for further information.
17	"Colonel McClaine"	Ken Turner	Tony Barwick	27 October 1968	16
Equipped with the knowledge and experience of an army driver and explosives expert, Joe is assigned to transport a dangerous chemical across Africa.
18	"Lone-Handed 90"	Ken Turner	Desmond Saunders & Keith Wilson	9 March 1969	20
While the BIG RAT is out of action, Joe dreams of life as a sheriff in the Wild West.
19	"The Race"	Alan Perry	Tony Barwick	19 January 1969 (Harlech)	18
Joe is given his father's brain pattern and they share a dream, revolving around a madcap rally race from London to Monte Carlo.
20	"The Professional"	Leo Eaton	Donald James	12 January 1969 (Harlech)	19
Using the brain pattern of a convicted safe-cracker, Joe infiltrates a castle to retrieve a dictator's undeserved gold bullion.
21	"Talkdown"	Alan Perry	Tony Barwick	19 January 1969 (Tyne Tees)	22
Joe takes the place of an injured test pilot to demonstrate a new hypersonic fighter aircraft, only to find himself in mortal danger.
22	"Breakout"	Leo Eaton	Shane Rimmer	2 February 1969 (Harlech)	23
A pair of convicts break out of a Canadian jail and threaten to kill the country's prime minister unless they are given a generous ransom.
23	"Child of the Sun God"	Alan Perry	John Lucarotti	9 February 1969 (Harlech)	26
World leaders are left paralysed after being attacked with poison darts known to have been used only by a lost South American tribe.
24	"Trial At Sea"	Brian Heard	Donald James	16 March 1969 (Tyne Tees)	27
With the brain pattern of a terrorist, Joe has little time to prevent the destruction of a new transatlantic hoverliner.
25	"Viva Cordova"	Peter Anderson	Tony Barwick	9 March 1969 (Harlech)	30
Joe must act as a bodyguard to a new, democratically elected president to prevent his assassination at the hands of the country's former dictator.
26	"Attack of the Tiger"	Peter Anderson	Tony Barwick	2 March 1969 (Tyne Tees)	21
Joe pilots a new fighter-bomber to destroy a nuclear weapons base before a device is placed in orbit to hold the world to ransom.
27	"Mission X-41"	Ken Turner	Pat Dunlop	30 March 1969	24
Assuming the skills of a leading virologist, Joe tries to steal the antibody for a deadly virus before it can be used to attack the West.
28	"Test Flight"	Peter Anderson	Donald James	9 March 1969 (Tyne Tees)	25
Joe tries to find out whether the crash of a prototype spaceplane was an accident or sabotage.
29	"See You Down There"	Leo Eaton	Tony Barwick	9 February 1969 (Tyne Tees)	28
An exploitative businessman is compelled to change his ways after he is bewildered by Joe 90's multitude of brain patterns.
30	"The Birthday"	Leo Eaton	Tony Barwick	23 March 1969 (Tyne Tees)	29
Clip show episode: Joe reaches his tenth birthday, and celebrates with his friends as they reminisce over his many adventures.

== Compilation film ==
In 1981, a compilation film was released comprising re-edited versions of four of the original episodes.

Title	Compilation of	Released	Length
The Amazing Adventures of Joe 90	"The Most Special Agent", "Splashdown", "Attack of the Tiger" and "Arctic Adventure"	1981	93 mins approx.
