= The Most Special Agent =

- Joe 90 episode
- Episode no.: Episode 1
- Directed by: Desmond Saunders
- Written by: Gerry Anderson; Sylvia Anderson
- Cinematography by: Julien Lugrin
- Editing by: Harry MacDonald
- Production code: 1
- Original air date: 29 September 1968

Guest character voices
- Keith Alexander as; Russian Pilot Russian Air Defence Controller Armoured Vehicle Operator: Gary Files as; Moscow Airbase Guard Manston Controller Farmer MiG-242 Pilot (Red Leader) Reporter John Woodburn Russian Radio Operator: David Healy as; Russian Commander Moscow Airbase Controller

Episode chronology
← Previous —	Next → "Hi-jacked"

"The Most Special Agent" is the first episode of Joe 90, a British Supermarionation television series created by Gerry and Sylvia Anderson and filmed by their production company Century 21 for ITC Entertainment. Written by the Andersons and David Lane and directed by Desmond Saunders, it was first broadcast on 29 September 1968 on Associated Television and Tyne Tees Television.

Set in the future, the series follows the adventures of nine-year-old schoolboy Joe McClaine, who becomes the "Most Special Agent" of the World Intelligence Network (WIN). With the help of the Brain Impulse Galvanoscope Record And Transfer (BIG RAT), a mind uploading device created by his adoptive father Professor "Mac" McClaine, Joe assumes the knowledge and experience of leading experts to carry out dangerous spy missions for WIN, his youth and innocence helping him to avoid raising enemy suspicion.

In the first episode of the series, Mac transfers his own brain pattern to Joe to demonstrate the BIG RAT's potential to his friend Sam Loover, a WIN agent. In a meeting at WIN's London headquarters, Loover's superior Shane Weston seeks to recruit Joe and the BIG RAT, hypothesising a mission in which Joe steals a Russian fighter to illustrate how boy and machine could become valuable assets to the organisation. The episode has received a mixed response, drawing praise for its technical direction but some criticism for its use of a Cold War-inspired fictitious scenario to explain the series' concept.

== Plot ==
Computer scientist Professor Ian "Mac" McClaine invites his friend Sam Loover to his Dorset cottage to view his latest invention, the Brain Impulse Galvanoscope Record And Transfer (BIG RAT). The device is capable of interfacing with the human brain, allowing the knowledge and experience of one person to be transferred to the mind of another. To demonstrate, Mac transfers his own "brain pattern" to his nine-year-old adopted son Joe. The transfer is a success, with Joe instantly displaying his father's expert knowledge of supercomputers.

Although Mac plans to sell his device, Loover, an agent of the World Intelligence Network (WIN), persuades him to keep it a secret, believing that Joe and the BIG RAT could prove highly valuable assets to the organisation. The McClaines travel to WIN's London headquarters in Mac's flying Jet-Air Car to meet Loover and his superior, WIN commander-in-chief Shane Weston. To show the merit of WIN's proposal, Weston invites the McClaines to imagine a scenario in which Joe, aided by the BIG RAT, is assigned to capture a Russian aircraft ...

At a press conference in London, a Russian pilot is answering questions on his country's new MiG-242, the world's most powerful fighter-bomber. He is unaware that Mac and Loover are using a concealed antenna to record his brain pattern and transmit it to the McClaines' cottage, where it is transferred to Joe through the BIG RAT. Joe is given a pair of special glasses that allow him access to the pilot's entire knowledge and experience. His mission is to steal a MiG-242 and fly it to England for study, thus eliminating the Russian tactical advantage over the West.

Travelling to a Moscow airbase, Mac and Joe join a group of aviation experts who are viewing MiG-242s at close range. Joe slips out of the tour bus and takes off in one of the aircraft. The soldier guiding the tour tells the authorities that the MiG-242 was stolen by a child and is arrested on the orders of the incredulous base commander. In the air, Joe shoots down a squad of MiG-242s launched to intercept him and then bombs a missile base targeting him from the ground. Reaching British airspace, he lands at Manston Airfield and abandons the MiG-242 before it is surrounded by armoured vehicles. He is then picked up by Loover in the Jet-Air Car and flown home. A farmer's eyewitness account of the boy's escape is met with scepticism by the airfield controller ...

Ending his story, Weston reminds the McClaines that his scenario has little basis in fact: the MiG-242 does not exist and Russia and the West are at peace. He asks Mac to pledge Joe and the BIG RAT's services to WIN. Mac is outraged by the idea, insisting that Joe is too young to be a spy. A fierce argument ensues, but when Loover points out Joe and the BIG RAT's extraordinary potential, Mac reluctantly agrees. Joe joins WIN as its "Most Special Agent".

== Regular voice cast ==
- Keith Alexander as Sam Loover
- Rupert Davies as Professor Ian "Mac" McClaine
- Len Jones as Joe McClaine
- David Healy as Shane Weston

== Production ==
The episode was written by series creators Gerry and Sylvia Anderson with assistance from producer David Lane, who was uncredited for his contribution. Although it has no on-screen title, it was referred to in all production documents and promotional material as "The Most Special Agent". The fictional MiG-242 was inspired by the real-life MiG fighters built by the USSR's Mikoyan and Gurevich Design Bureau (MiG).

In the earliest version of the script, written in the autumn of 1967, Joe was to have joined the CIA. Shane Weston was originally written as the Deputy Director of the CIA, with the meeting between the characters taking place at the Embassy of the United States in London. The agency's name and Weston's position were changed when Shane Rimmer and script editor Tony Barwick composed the bible for the series. The original script included a short scene, absent from the finished episode, in which a London police officer pauses in amazement at the sight of the Jet-Air Car parked in the street. It also featured an extended version of the McClaines' flight to Moscow, with Mac telling Joe that Russia is letting foreigners view the MiG-242 because it wants the world to see the aircraft as a "purely defensive weapon". In the finished episode, this is reduced to a single shot of Mac and Joe without dialogue.

=== Filming and music ===
Puppet filming for the episode began on 13 November 1967 and ran for three weeks, finishing in early December. This coincided with the production of "The Inquisition", the series finale of Captain Scarlet and the Mysterons. Director Desmond Saunders, also the new series' production controller, had previously directed Captain Scarlet's first episode.

The shots of Joe receiving Mac's brain pattern served as the series' title sequence. In some episodes, including this one, the sequence was preceded by a cold open and integrated into the narrative. The puppet playing the Russian commander was originally made for Captain Scarlet but was ultimately went unused in that series. The argument between Mac, Sam and Shane was unscripted; it is presented using still photographs of the characters overlaid with the voice actors' improvised dialogue.

The episode's incidental music and series' theme music were recorded on 18 January 1968 with a 28-piece orchestra in a four-hour session at Olympic Studios. The piece that introduces the Moscow airbase imitates the Russian folk tune "The Song of the Volga Boatmen".

=== Design and effects ===
The scale model shots of the airliner flying the McClaines to Russia were originally recorded for the Captain Scarlet episode "Flight 104". Some of the models making up the Moscow airbase previously appeared in the feature film Thunderbirds Are Go (1966). The shots of the missile base bombing were recycled from Thunderbird 6 (1968), in which they show the chain reaction caused by the destruction of Skyship One.

The MiG-242 model and puppet-size cockpit were adapted from the Angel Interceptor model and cockpit from Captain Scarlet. Designer Mike Trim was instructed to base his concept around the shape of the Angel cockpit because, in his words, Century 21's art department "wanted to get their money's worth by using [the cockpit] in as many ways as possible." Trim purposely incorporated "Russian features" in the overall design. The re-dressed cockpit went on to appear in several other episodes of Joe 90.

In a DVD audio commentary for the episode, Trim said that while the script did not specify the type of bus that carries Mac and Joe around the airbase, he chose to design it as a hovercraft because he thought that a wheeled vehicle would have looked "boring". Trim also designed the Russian "hover-tank", believing that it "made sense from a design standpoint" to make it similar to the "hover-bus". The ground-to-air missiles fired at Joe were based on a real Russian design.

== Broadcast and reception ==
The episode was incorrectly listed as "The Most Special Astronaut" in some British TV guides. It was first broadcast on 29 September 1968 on Associated Television and Tyne Tees Television to an audience that included an estimated one million adults. Prior to its first broadcast on London Weekend Television on 5 October – directly opposite the fourth episode of the Doctor Who serial The Mind Robber on BBC1 – Len Jones, the voice of Joe, stated that his character would "slaughter that soppy Doctor Who. He may only be a puppet, but he is more realistic."

The episode had its BBC1 premiere on 23 April 1994, when it was seen by roughly a quarter of a million viewers. On 27 August 2000, it was shown on Channel 5 as part of a Gerry Anderson-themed day of programming.

=== Critical response ===
Writing for the Anderson fanzine Andersonic, author Sam Denham gives the episode a negative review, describing "The Most Special Agent" as "visually and technically a triumph" but otherwise a "disaster". According to Denham, the episode "makes no attempt to present [Joe] as interesting or appealing", while its "cop-out" plot and the closing "photomontage" argument merely "[add] to the air of disappointment." He concludes: "The best that can be said about 'Most Special Agent' is that it has some explosions in it (and even some of these are knocked off from Thunderbird 6)." By contrast, Jim Sangster and Paul Condon, authors of Collins Telly Guide, describe the photomontage as "more emotionally fraught than anything that had gone before", viewing it as an example of the series' superior direction compared to earlier Anderson productions.

Marcus Hearn, author of Thunderbirds: The Vault, believes that the plot was inspired partly by events from Gerry Anderson's youth. He suggests that the Russian pilot whose brain pattern is taken was based on Anderson's elder brother Lionel, an RAF pilot who was killed in action during the Second World War. He considers "Manston Airfield" to be based on RAF Manston, where Anderson and Keith Shackleton, head of Century 21 Merchandising, completed their National Service during the late 1940s.

The episode has also been analysed with reference to the Cold War. Jonathan Bignell describes Joe's fictitious mission, which alludes to an arms race, as an "unusually precise reference" to the series' "1960s context". Writing for TV Zone magazine, Tat Wood questions the logic of Shane Weston's conjecture, criticising his decision to make Russia the enemy given that it forces him to clarify that East and West are no longer enemies: "This rather limits the possibilities of the World Intelligence Network's 'Very Special Agent' [sic]." Stephen La Rivière finds this belated admission amusing.

According to Nicholas J. Cull, the fact that the ending stresses a lack of hostility shows how Anderson "took an end to the Cold War as a given in his work." He notes that the episode's first broadcast in September 1968 came only a few weeks after the Soviet invasion of Czechoslovakia, which placed even more strain on East-West relations. In an interview with Cull, Anderson said that although he had been influenced by technological aspects of the Cold War, he did not want to promote its stereotypes. In another interview, he commented: "I'd always tried very hard not to put my ten cents into creating World War III."

== In other media ==
The series finale, "The Birthday", is a clip show that includes a flashback to this episode.

In 1969, Arrowtabs released two condensed, silent, black-and-white versions of "The Most Special Agent" on 8 mm film. The same year, footage from the episode was used in Joe 90-themed TV advertisements for Kellogg's Sugar Smacks breakfast cereal.

In 1981, ITC's New York offices combined "The Most Special Agent" and three other episodes to create The Amazing Adventures of Joe 90, a made-for-TV Joe 90 compilation film.

The 2003 Joe 90 DVD box set by A&E Home Video features an audio commentary for the episode with effects designer Mike Trim.
