= Joe 90 =

British science-fiction TV series (1968–1969)

- Genre: Science fiction
- Created by: Gerry & Sylvia Anderson
- Voices of: Keith Alexander; Sylvia Anderson; Rupert Davies; Gary Files; Len Jones; Martin King; David Healy; Jeremy Wilkin; Liz Morgan; Shane Rimmer
- Music by: Barry Gray
- Country of origin: United Kingdom
- Original language: English
- No. of series: 1
- No. of episodes: 30 (list of episodes)

Production
- Executive producer: Reg Hill
- Producer: David Lane
- Cinematography: Julien Lugrin; Paddy Seale
- Editors: Harry MacDonald; Bob Dearberg; Len Cleal; Alan Killick; Norman A. Cole
- Running time: 25 minutes
- Production company: Century 21 Television Productions

Original release
- Network: ITV
- Release: 29 September 1968 – 20 April 1969

Related
- Captain Scarlet and the Mysterons; The Secret Service

Joe 90 is a British science fiction television series created by Gerry and Sylvia Anderson and filmed by their production company, Century 21, for ITC Entertainment. It follows the exploits of nine-year-old schoolboy Joe McClaine, who becomes a spy after his adoptive father invents a device capable of recording expert knowledge and experience and transferring it to another human brain. Armed with the skills of the world's top academic and military minds, Joe is recruited by the World Intelligence Network (WIN) as its "Most Special Agent".

First broadcast on the ITV regional franchises between 1968 and 1969, the 30-episode series was the final Anderson production to be made primarily using Supermarionation, a form of electronic marionette puppetry. The following series, The Secret Service, included extensive footage of live actors. As in the preceding series, Captain Scarlet and the Mysterons, the puppets of Joe 90 are of natural body proportions rather than the caricatured design used in Thunderbirds and its precursors.

Though not as successful as Century 21's earlier productions, Joe 90 has been praised for the characterisation of its main puppet cast and the quality of its scale model sets and special effects. Commentators have interpreted the spy-fi theme and use of a boy protagonist as both a "kids-play-Bond" concept and an enshrinement of children's imagination. The series has drawn some criticism for its lack of female characters, especially compared to the Andersons' earlier series.

Century 21 produced tie-ins from comic strips to toy cars. The series was syndicated in the United States in 1969, repeated in the UK in the 1990s and released on DVD in the 2000s. A live-action film adaptation has been proposed more than once but remains undeveloped.

== Premise ==
Joe 90 is widely believed to be set in 2012 and 2013. The scriptwriters' guide stated that the year is 1998, while other sources place the series at an unspecified point in the early 21st century. The episode "The Unorthodox Shepherd" is implied to be set in 2013. (Note: Written by Tony Barwick. Directed by Ken Turner (22 December 1968). "The Unorthodox Shepherd". Joe 90. Episode 13.)

The series revolves around the eponymous Joe, a nine-year-old schoolboy and the adopted son of widowed computer expert Professor Ian "Mac" McClaine. Ostensibly an ordinary father-and-son pair, the McClaines live in an Elizabethan-style cottage on the Dorset coast. In the basement of the cottage is a secret laboratory containing Mac's latest invention, the Brain Impulse Galvanoscope Record And Transfer (referred to by the acronym "BIG RAT"): a machine capable of recording a person's knowledge and experience and transferring it to the mind of another. The BIG RAT is centred around the "Rat Trap": a spinning, spherical cage in which the pre-recorded "brain patterns" are uploaded to the recipient.

Sam Loover, a friend of Mac and an agent of the World Intelligence Network (WIN), recognises the potential of Joe and the BIG RAT and persuades the McClaines to pledge their services to the organisation. With the aid of the BIG RAT, Joe becomes a spy unlike any other: by taking on the brain patterns of expert adults, he gains the skills needed to undertake dangerous missions, while his youth helps him to avoid arousing enemy suspicion. (Note: Written by Gerry and Sylvia Anderson. Directed by Desmond Saunders (29 September 1968). "The Most Special Agent". Joe 90. Episode 1.) As long as he wears a pair of special glasses, which contain electrodes that store the transferred brain patterns, he is able to carry out all manner of assignments—from piloting fighter aircraft (Note: Written by Tony Barwick. Directed by Alan Perry (9 February 1969). "Talkdown". Joe 90. Episode 20.) (Note: Written by Tony Barwick. Directed by Peter Anderson (16 March 1969). "Attack of the Tiger". Joe 90. Episode 25.) (Note: Written by Pat Dunlop. Directed by Ken Turner (30 March 1969). "Mission X-41". Joe 90. Episode 27.) to performing neurosurgery (Note: Written by Gerry Anderson and David Lane. Directed by Ken Turner (15 December 1968). "Operation McClaine". Joe 90. Episode 12.) to playing the piano. (Note: Written by Tony Barwick. Directed by Alan Perry (17 November 1968). "International Concerto". Joe 90. Episode 8.) Known as WIN's "Most Special Agent", Joe 90 reports to Shane Weston, the network's commander-in-chief in London, and carries a specially adapted school case featuring a secret compartment that contains a radio transceiver and high-capacity handgun. (Note: There is some inconsistency as to why Joe is codenamed "90". According to the series' publicity, he is so called because he is the 90th WIN agent to be based in London. However, the episode "Project 90" implies that it originates from "File Number 90", WIN's secret dossier on the BIG RAT (La Rivière, p. 185).) (Note: Written by Tony Barwick. Directed by Alan Perry (20 October 1968). "Hi-jacked". Joe 90. Episode 4.) The series ends with a clip show episode set on Joe's 10th birthday, in which a number of his missions are recalled as flashbacks during a surprise party. (Note: Written by Tony Barwick. Directed by Leo Eaton (20 April 1969). "The Birthday". Joe 90. Episode 30.)

Like earlier Supermarionation series, Joe 90 features secret organisations, (Note: Written by Tony Barwick. Directed by Peter Anderson (13 October 1968). "Project 90". Joe 90. Episode 3.) rescue missions, (Note: Written by Shane Rimmer. Directed by Peter Anderson (8 December 1968). "Relative Danger". Joe 90. Episode 11.) global security threats and advanced technology: (Note: Written by Donald James. Directed by Leo Eaton (26 January 1969). "The Professional". Joe 90. Episode 18.) the last exemplified by the "Jet Air Car", a land-sea-air vehicle invented by Mac as the primary means of transport for him and Joe. Like the World Aquanaut Security Patrol (WASP) in Stingray, the World Intelligence Network (WIN) is a global organisation referred to by an acronym. In the fictional world of Joe 90, the Cold War—significant when the series was first broadcast, due to the 1968 invasion of Czechoslovakia—has ended and a world government has been formed. WIN is the successor to MI6, the Central Intelligence Agency and the KGB, which all merged to form the new global spy network. Although the first episode sees Joe hi-jack a prototype Russian fighter and bring it to England, this is revealed to be a fiction imagined by Weston to explain the types of espionage that the boy will perform as a WIN agent. This plot twist, which also reveals that Russia and the West are now allies, has been praised by media historian Nicholas J. Cull for its "progressiveness of spirit" and for demonstrating Gerry Anderson's wish to "[take] an end to the Cold War as a given in his work". Cull states that Anderson was motivated by what he viewed as a "duty to the rising generation to avoid perpetuating Cold War stereotypes".

However, despite the existence of a world government, the nations of Earth are still divided into Western and Eastern blocs. Here, Cull argues, Joe 90 is similar to earlier Anderson series in that it "unashamedly capitalised on the Cold War cult of the secret agent whose skills defend the home from enemies unknown". Hostile entities include the Eastern Alliance, which dominates Asia and appears in the episodes "Attack of the Tiger" and "Mission X-41". "Arctic Adventure" and "Attack of the Tiger" combine the threat from the East with dangerous nuclear technology: in the former, Joe attempts to recover a lost atomic warhead from the ocean floor while avoiding enemy submarines; in the latter, he must destroy a nuclear device before it is launched into orbit to hold the world to ransom. (Note: Written by Tony Barwick. Directed by Alan Perry (5 January 1968). "Arctic Adventure". Joe 90. Episode 15.) In contrast, "Big Fish" portrays nuclear technology as a force for good: in this episode, Joe pilots a damaged nuclear submarine out of the territorial waters of a Latin American police state. (Note: Written by Shane Rimmer. Directed by Leo Eaton (1 December 1968). "Big Fish". Joe 90. Episode 10.)

== Voice cast ==
Four of the regular characters: (left to right) Sam Loover, Shane Weston, Mac and (in front of Mac) Joe

Compared to Captain Scarlet, Joe 90 features a smaller cast of just five regular characters. Like the preceding series, it has been described as more "English-sounding" than Thunderbirds, the Andersons having dispensed with the idea that the main character should be a "square-jawed, fair-skinned male with a Mid-Atlantic accent". Instead, Joe 90 focuses on the strong American supporting characters of Sam Loover and Shane Weston.

- Len Jones as Joe McClaine. While child characters in earlier Supermarionation series had been voiced by grown actresses, Joe was voiced by a child actor to give the new series greater realism. Gerry Anderson commented that having a woman voice a boy "always sounded rather odd to me. It never sounded like a real little boy ... With Joe 90, I suggested finding a British kid and making him repeat the lines parrot fashion." He described Jones' performance as "only adequate, but at least it sounded authentic."
- Rupert Davies as Professor Ian "Mac" McClaine. At the time of production, Davies was well known for playing Maigret in the TV series of the same name, a role that had left him typecast. He was the most distinguished actor yet to contribute to an Anderson series. In Gerry Anderson's biography What Made Thunderbirds Go!, Simon Archer and Marcus Hearn describe Mac's "warm yet distinguished" English tones as a "perfect counterpoint" to Sam Loover and Shane Weston.
- Keith Alexander as Sam Loover. Alexander had previously voiced characters in Thunderbird 6 as a replacement for Ray Barrett. During the 1960s, he also provided the voice of another puppet character, Topo Gigio, on The Ed Sullivan Show in the US.
- David Healy as Shane Weston. Healy, an American expatriate actor, had voiced guest characters in Captain Scarlet and often played transatlantic characters in British television.
- Sylvia Anderson as Mrs Harris, the McClaines' housekeeper, who is unaware of their involvement with WIN. Anderson was best known for voicing Lady Penelope in Thunderbirds and its film sequels.

Supporting characters were voiced by Alexander, Healy and Anderson as well as returning voice actors Gary Files, Martin King, Jeremy Wilkin, Shane Rimmer and (for one episode, "Viva Cordova") Liz Morgan. Rimmer and Morgan were not credited for their contributions. Files said that he was "tickled pink" to be working with Davies, commenting: "I hated the way that so many so-called producers wouldn't meet his eye. He was Maigret forever, you see, in their eyes." On her one role in Joe 90, Morgan said: "They needed a voice, they called around and everyone else was out shopping. So they called me in."

== Production ==
=== Development ===
Joe 90 was intended to be a different kind of Supermarionation series, with the emphasis less on action, gadgetry and special effects and more on characterisation and plots that were more spy thriller than science fiction. According to Gerry Anderson, "The show majored on its characters, which I thought were all very good. The puppets had become so lifelike, I now strongly believed that they could carry the action without the usual massive assistance from futuristic hardware."

When it came to devising the series, Anderson was inspired by his early work as an assistant editor on films such as The Wicked Lady (1945), for which he handled recording tape on a daily basis. While reflecting on the uses of the tape, Anderson made an association with the workings of the human brain: "I read somewhere that the human brain is controlled by electrical impulses and how thoughts are stored electronically. I started toying with the story potential of a process that would allow the recording of brain patterns and transferring them to another brain. I was really likening it to magnetic recording, where material could be stored or transferred to another tape." As to naming the main character, Anderson remembered that Steve Zodiac, the protagonist of Fireball XL5, was originally to have had the surname "Ninety".

=== Writing and filming ===
The series was commissioned by Lew Grade in the autumn of 1967. Pre-production was completed in October while the last episodes of Captain Scarlet were being filmed. Principal photography ran from 13 November 1967 to mid-August 1968 on the two puppet stages at Century 21's studios on the Slough Trading Estate. (Note: Slough Trading Estate: 51°31′28″N 0°37′30″W (principal photography and editing)) Each episode took an average of two weeks to film.

As with their earlier series, the Andersons wrote the first episode ("The Most Special Agent"). Before they devised WIN, Joe was to have become the "Most Special Agent" of the CIA. Most of the episodes were written by Tony Barwick, with Shane Rimmer contributing six scripts. Rimmer was hired while co-authoring a book with Barwick, who initially offered him a two-script contract. Those scripts were "Splashdown" and "Big Fish".

Occupied by Thunderbird 6 and his live-action film Doppelgänger, Gerry Anderson was unable to serve as producer as he had on Captain Scarlet. The role was assumed by Reg Hill and David Lane. Lane remembered that as producer he was responsible for "looking at the scripts, the effects, the puppets, the whole thing really". He found support in Anderson's long-serving collaborator Desmond Saunders, who directed the first episode and stayed on as production manager for the rest of the series. Joe 90's other directors included Leo Eaton, Alan Perry and Ken Turner, all of whom had directed episodes of Captain Scarlet, and Peter Anderson, who was promoted from assistant director to replace Brian Burgess and Robert Lynn.

A Christmas-themed episode, "The Unorthodox Shepherd", featured location shooting to an extent that Century 21 had never attempted before. The following series, The Secret Service, advanced this hybrid format by combining puppet sequences with extensive footage of live actors.

=== Production design ===
Examples of model work for Joe 90: Professor McClaine's Jet Air Car (left) and Sam Loover's car (right), both at 1/24 scale, parked in front of WIN Headquarters. Loover's car was made open-top to accommodate the puppets' head wires. In the end, shots inside the car used "under-control" versions of the puppets that were operated from beneath the set.

The Supermarionation puppets of Joe 90 were the naturally proportioned kind that had been introduced for Captain Scarlet. The drive for increased realism in all design aspects that had begun with the preceding series continued in Joe 90. Except for Captains Scarlet and Blue, all of the main character puppets from Captain Scarlet were re-used. Few new puppets were made, the only notable exceptions being Mac (who was sculpted on "bouncing bomb" designer Barnes Wallis), Joe and Mrs Harris.

Joe was the first child marionette to be made as part of the new generation of Supermarionation puppets. The puppets of Sam Loover and Shane Weston had each made several guest appearances in Captain Scarlet. For their regular roles in Joe 90 they were given a range of alternative "mood" heads, including "smilers", "frowners" and "blinkers". The Weston puppet was also re-wigged. Many of Century 21's "revamp puppets", which had played supporting characters in Captain Scarlet, were copied in darker skin colours to portray a range of ethnicities. As two stages were being used for filming, the "expressionless" main character puppets were also duplicated. Like Captain Scarlet, Joe 90 also featured "under-control" puppets that were manipulated by levers from under the set instead of wires from an overhead gantry.

In other production design areas, Keith Wilson and Grenville Nott succeeded Bob Bell as heads of the art department and built the inside of Culver Bay Cottage from a design by Mike Trim. Anderson remembered being pleased with the cottage set: "The interior, with its beams and lovely soft furnishings, was really beautiful." The BIG RAT model was built by the newly formed Century 21 Props (or Century 21 Electronics), which was based in Bourne End (Note: Century 21 Props: 51°34′31″N 0°42′35″W (props and electronics)) and was responsible for making the gadget props that appear in the series.

Though busy with Thunderbird 6 and Doppelgänger, Derek Meddings briefly reprised his role as special effects director to construct Mac's Jet Air Car. The vehicle was a disappointment to Anderson, who commented that it "looked like no other piece of hardware we had had previously, but I was wary of canning it as I feared I might be becoming stereotyped." Stephen La Rivière considers the Jet Air Car an update of Supercar from the series of the same name. However, he agrees that while the car is Joe 90's "star vehicle", it is unimpressive compared to the "beautiful, sleek design of its predecessor".

=== Music ===
The theme and incidental music were composed by Barry Gray. Episodes begin with either a cold open (a first for an Anderson series) or the title sequence, which sees Joe receiving a brain pattern from the BIG RAT. The opening theme is dominated by the notes of guitarist Vic Flick, known for performing lead guitar in the "James Bond Theme" from the film Dr. No (1962). In Gerry Anderson's biography, What Made Thunderbirds Go!, the Joe 90 theme is described as a "dizzying piece of psychedelic pop art that could have been produced only in the late Sixties". The closing credits are superimposed over images of objects such as Joe's spectacles and WIN badge. While the concepts for these images were photographic, the final versions were augmented with airbrush artwork.

Besides the music for the first episode, "The Most Special Agent", Gray composed incidental music for a further 20 episodes. This music was recorded between 18 January and 27 September 1968, beginning with the titles and the first episode tracks in a session at the Olympic Sound Studios in London (Note: Olympic Sound Studios: 51°28′31″N 0°14′27″W (music recording)) and ending with the music for "See You Down There" at CTS Studios. Recording was sometimes conducted at Gray's house in Esher. (Note: Barry Gray Studio: 51°22′09″N 0°21′54″W (music recording)) Gray's compositions occasionally required guest talent. The piano music in the episode "International Concerto" was performed by Robert Docker, while the child's hands seen in the close-up shots of Joe playing belonged to Gray's son, Simon. "Lone-Handed 90" features a recurring harmonica played by Tommy Reilly.

Silva Screen Records released a Joe 90 soundtrack CD in 2006. Rating the CD three-and-a-half stars out of five, AllMusic reviewer William Ruhlmann comments that while the music is "not great writing" it remains "perfectly adequate, if not inspired." Earlier releases include a 45 rpm gramophone record, Title Theme from the ATV Series Joe 90, which also featured various incidental music.

Joe 90 (Original Television Soundtrack)

Soundtrack album by Barry Gray
- Released: 15 May 2006
- Genre: Pop
- Length: 78:07
- Label: Silva Screen Records

No.	Title	Length
1.	"Century 21 Sting"	0:10
2.	"Main Titles" (Stereo. From "The Most Special Agent")	1:58
3.	"The Most Special Agent" (Stereo)	3:21
4.	"Arctic Adventure"	5:07
5.	"Operation McClaine"	2:25
6.	"The Race"	5.39
7.	"Double Agent Entertainment" (Stereo. From "Double Agent")	2:02
8.	"Jungle Fortress" (Stereo. From "The Fortress")	2:03
9.	"Dr Darota's Alpine Clinic" (Stereo. From "Project 90")	1:38
10.	"Balloon Flight" (Stereo. From "Project 90")	4:04
11.	"Death, Love and Betrayal" (Stereo. From "Three's a Crowd")	3:32
12.	"Tragedy Aboard the U85" (Stereo. From "Big Fish")	3:19
13.	"Porto Guavan" (Stereo. From "Big Fish")	3:18
14.	"King for a Day"	5:18
15.	"The Unorthodox Shepherd" (Stereo)	2:24
16.	"Mission Tango 120" (From "Hi-jacked")	5:02
17.	"Break Sting – Version 1" (Stereo)	0:04
18.	"Lyons Maid Commercial"	0:29
19.	"Break Sting – Version 2" (Stereo)	0:07
20.	"Showdown at Colletti's Hideout" (From "Hi-jacked")	3:34
21.	"International Concerto" (Stereo)	3:47
22.	"A Piano Recital from Igor Sladek" (From "International Concerto")	1:39
23.	"Relative Danger"	3:12
24.	"Splashdown" (Stereo)	4:43
25.	"The Colonel's March" (From "Colonel McClaine")	1:35
26.	"Lone-Handed 90"	4:48
27.	"End Titles" (Stereo)	1:26
28.	"Opening Titles" (Stereo)	1:23

== Release ==
=== Broadcast ===
Joe 90 debuted on Associated Television and Tyne Tees Television in late September 1968. Broadcasts on LWT, Southern Television and Anglia Television began shortly after. The series reached Harlech and Channel Television in November and Granada Television on Christmas Day. Granada, which started its run with the Christmas-themed "The Unorthodox Shepherd" rather than "The Most Special Agent", was one of several broadcasters to transmit the series under the alternative title The Adventures of Joe 90. In the US, Joe 90 aired in first-run syndication in 1969.

The series had several UK re-runs during the 1970s but was not shown on Yorkshire Television until 1981. Some broadcasters used an alternative version of the title sequence beginning with a zoom-in shot of Joe's special glasses accompanied by a voice-over from Tim Turner stating: "These are Joe 90's special glasses. Without them, he's a boy. Wearing them, he's an expert." These words, intended to warn young viewers not to endanger themselves by copying Joe's exploits, have sometimes been wrongly attributed to Keith Alexander.

In 1994, Joe 90 was shown on BBC1 as part of the Children's BBC strand. Rights holder PolyGram cleared the series for broadcast on the condition that the title sequence's "zooming" Joe 90 logo be replaced with a static version to distinguish it from the logo for G.I. Joe toys. The video tapes used for broadcast were 16 mm transfers of the original 35 mm film and were edited for timing reasons: cold opens were moved so that all episodes began with the title sequence, while the end titles were shrunk to allow a CBBC presenter to read out viewer birthday cards. A simultaneous run on Nickelodeon presented the episodes in their original forms. The series was shown several more times on the BBC until 1997. In 2009, the series aired on the UK Sci Fi Channel alongside Thunderbirds and Captain Scarlet.

=== Home media ===
In the 1980s, Channel 5 (later PolyGram Video) released the series on home video in the UK. The eight-volume set featured the episodes "The Most Special Agent", "Splashdown", "Attack of the Tiger" and "Arctic Adventure" in their re-edited forms from the 1981 compilation film The Amazing Adventures of Joe 90, which itself received three video releases in the 1980s. Re-released in 1992, the set used 16 mm prints of poorer quality than the original film.

In 2002, Carlton released a five-disc Region 2 DVD box set and a VHS box set of five tapes sourced from a digital remaster of the original 35 mm prints. This was followed by DVD Region 1 and Region 4 releases in 2003. A French-language release—Joe 90: Agent Très Spécial—hit the Canadian market in 2004. Through these releases, the episodes that make up the compilation film were made commercially available in their unedited forms for the first time.

==== DVD ====
Title and country	Region	Specifications	Distributor	Special features	Released
Joe 90 – The Complete Series; US	1	Discs – 4; Format – NTSC; Language – English; Aspect ratio – 1.33:1	A&E Home Video	Commentaries: "The Most Special Agent" (with Mike Trim); "The Unorthodox Shepherd" (with Ken Turner); Character Biographies – Joe McClaine, Professor McClaine, Sam Loover, Shane Weston; Information Files – WIN, Culver Bay Cottage, the BIG RAT, Mac's Jet Air Car, Joe's Briefcase; Galleries	29 July 2003
Joe 90 – Agent Très Spécial; Canada	1	Discs – 4; Format – NTSC; Language – French; Aspect ratio – 1.33:1	Imavision	Character Biographies – Joe McClaine, Professor McClaine, Sam Loover, Shane Weston; Gallery	25 May 2004
Joe 90 – Complete Series; UK	2	Discs – 5; Format – PAL; Language – English; Aspect ratio – 4:3	Carlton International	1960s Warning Sequence (with Tim Turner); I Love the '90s Trailers; Character Biographies – Joe McClaine, Professor McClaine, Sam Loover, Shane Weston; Information Files – WIN, Culver Bay Cottage, the BIG RAT, Mac's Jet Air Car, Joe's Briefcase; Galleries; Location filming: "The Unorthodox Shepherd"; Draft End Titles; Original Artwork; Original Merchandise; Episode Photographs; Production Photographs	Box set; 30 September 2002; Volumes; 1 – 30 September 2002; 2 – 30 September 2002; 3 – 11 November 2002; 4 – 11 November 2002; 5 – 27 January 2003
Joe 90 – Complete Series; Australia	4	Discs – 5; Format – PAL; Language – English; Aspect ratio – 1.33:1	Beyond Home Entertainment	1960s Warning Sequence (with Tim Turner); I Love the '90s Trailers; Character Biographies – Joe McClaine, Professor McClaine, Sam Loover, Shane Weston; Information Files – WIN, Culver Bay Cottage, the BIG RAT, Mac's Jet Air Car, Joe's Briefcase; Galleries; Location filming: "The Unorthodox Shepherd"; Draft End Titles; Original Artwork; Original Merchandise; Episode Photographs; Production Photographs	8 October 2003

==== Blu-ray (UK) ====
Title	Episodes	Released
This is Supermarionation/HD21	"The Most Special Agent" and "Hi-jacked" (plus episodes from other Supermarionation series)	20 October 2014
Joe 90 – Volume 1	"The Most Special Agent", "Hi-jacked", "Splashdown", "Operation McClaine", "Three's a Crowd", "International Concerto", "Big Fish" and "The Unorthodox Shepherd"	29 September 2018
Joe 90 – Volume 2	"Relative Danger", "Business Holiday", "King for a Day", "Double Agent", "Most Special Astronaut", "Arctic Adventure", "The Fortress" and "Colonel McClaine"	10 December 2018
Joe 90 – Volume 3	"Project 90", "The Race", "The Professional", "Lone-Handed 90", "Attack of the Tiger", "Talkdown", "Breakout" and "Mission X-41"	10 December 2018
Joe 90 – Volume 4	"Test Flight", "Child of the Sun God", "Trial at Sea", "Viva Cordova", "See You Down There" and "The Birthday" (plus additional documentaries)	18 March 2019
Joe 90 – The Complete Series	All	14 October 2019

== Reception ==
I liked the idea of it all being a sort of family thing and I also liked the puppets themselves more than the ones in Captain Scarlet. They had more character and were a bit of a move back to the earlier characters. […] We had old-lady housekeepers and that sort of thing, which I personally thought was much better.

— David Lane (2001)

Author John Peel questions Mac's ethics in "experimenting on" Joe to further the development of the BIG RAT. On Joe as a secret agent he jokingly remarks "presumably there are no child labour laws in the future!" La Rivière's attention is drawn to Mac's line at the end of the first episode: the admonition "Don't come crying to me if you get hurt!" demonstrates the professor's willingness to "abnegate all parental responsibility". Noting Joe 90's subscription to "wider themes in Cold War culture", Cull likens the BIG RAT's capabilities to brainwashing but concludes that fundamentally it is "benign" technology. The stronger violence introduced in Captain Scarlet is sometimes evident in Joe 90: in "Hi-jacked", Joe kills an enemy with a grenade, while in "Project 90", Mac narrowly avoids having his head pulverised by a drill. Desmond Saunders comments: "There was an unpleasant side to [the series] which I never really understood. There was something about it that was very strange and sinister."

Producer David Lane praises the series for its humour, contrasting this with the darker tone of Captain Scarlet. He believes Joe 90 to be considerably more family-friendly, summing it up as "a great little programme". Anthony Clark of the British Film Institute commends Joe 90 for including more effective characterisation than Captain Scarlet, also praising the writing and Barry Gray's musical score. La Rivière highlights the connection between the boy protagonist and the theme of espionage, writing that the series' premise "taps into the fantasy indulged by most boys that they, even at nine years old, can be James Bond." Writer John R. Cook agrees with La Rivière's points on viewer self-identification, describing the series as "wish-fulfilment fantasy" and Joe as a reflection of the young target audience. Comparisons have been made to other media featuring child spies, such as the Spy Kids films and the Alex Rider novels.

I think the concept was a good one, but again there was a lack of humour and a lack of feminine influence. If you ever see anything that's all male, apart from a war film, it's a bit dull, isn't it?

— Sylvia Anderson (1992)

Premiered in the same year [as] 2001: A Space Odyssey, [...] Joe 90 expressed for its child audience equivalent kinds of "golden living dreams and visions" of futuristic possibility, appropriate to the then general utopian Zeitgeist.

— John R. Cook (2006)

La Rivière notes the intimacy of the premise and the predominantly male characters, suggesting that Joe 90 is "very much a Boy's Own adventure." Of the 30 episodes, only ten feature female characters, a fact that La Rivière attributes to Century 21's preoccupation with Thunderbird 6 and Doppelgänger. Peel suggests that the absence of female characters makes Joe 90 inferior to Thunderbirds. Grouping Joe 90 with Supercar and The Secret Service, Peel concludes that it is "hardly coincidental that these tend to be the least loved of [Anderson's] series; he had, after all, ignored half of his potential audience." He questions the comparisons to the James Bond films, arguing that "being a somewhat nerdy kid with glasses and brain implants was not really thrilling."

Both Gerry Anderson and Cull suggest that the series, with its bespectacled protagonist, boosted the self-confidence of young viewers who wore glasses. The name "Joe 90" has become a popular term of endearment for both children and adults who wear glasses similar to Joe's, such as snooker player Dennis Taylor. During the 1990s, comparisons were made between Joe and then-Prime Minister John Major, also known for his large glasses. Jeff Evans, author of The Penguin TV Companion, criticises the glasses as a plot device, writing that they make Joe "look more like the class swot than a secret agent."

Cook reads further into the series' theme of child empowerment, writing that Joe 90 creates a "technological utopia" around youth. He comments: "Through the character of Joe, his brain hardwired at the start of each episode into the BIG RAT supercomputer, the young are shown to be literally at one with technology." Cook suggests that BIG RAT's ability to provide Joe with instant access to brain patterns could be interpreted as a prediction of the development of the Internet. With his added knowledge and experience, Joe becomes the manifestation of homo superior, and yet his youth and imagination grant him the power to change the world in ways that no adult could. In this respect, Cook regards Joe 90 as a forerunner of The Tomorrow People, another series featuring themes of transcendence in children. This concept, Cook suggests, is evident in the title "Joe 90" itself: "No longer is [Joe] a nine-year-old boy but instead his status and capacities have been multiplied tenfold to transform him into agent 'Joe 90', his name an appealing futuristic echo of the then distant year of 1990."

Joe 90 lacked some of the lustre of the earlier shows. It didn't have much success, although I was proud of the concept. Maybe the stories assumed too much importance and the inadequacies of the puppets showed through.

— Gerry Anderson (2002)

Ultimately, Joe 90 has proven to be less successful than earlier Anderson productions. The authors of Supermarionation Classics praise the writing and model work but add that the series "failed to arouse more than a passing interest" with some fans. Stephen Hulse refers to Joe 90 as "technically accomplished" and "clearly the most child-oriented" of the Andersons' later puppet productions, but also calls it one of their "lesser series".

The series' spy-fi theme was further developed in the following Supermarionation production, The Secret Service, which like Joe 90 features an unconventional secret agent (a vicar—Father Stanley Unwin) and an intelligence agency with an acronym for a name (BISHOP—short for "British Intelligence Service Headquarters, Operation Priest").

== Other media ==
Series tie-ins included a Century 21 Toys range comprising friction-drive and battery-operated versions of the Jet Air Car and Sam Loover's car. Also available were Joe's WIN briefcase (complete with replica gadgets and pistol) and his WIN badge (reading "Most Special Agent"). The series was also given its own weekly comic, Joe 90 Top Secret, published by City Magazines, which ran for 34 issues and presented the TV episodes in strip form, while also including strips based on the TV shows The Champions and Land of the Giants. In September 1969, Joe 90 Top Secret merged with TV21 (formerly TV Century 21) to form TV21 and Joe 90. After a further 36 issues, the Joe 90 strips were dropped and the title reverted to TV21. Other print media included 1968 and 1969 Joe 90 annuals by Century 21 Publishing/City Magazines as well as two short novels by May Fair Books: Joe 90 and the Raiders and Joe 90 in Revenge.

In 1981, the New York branch of ITC released a Joe 90 compilation film, The Amazing Adventures of Joe 90, comprising the episodes "The Most Special Agent", "Splashdown", "Attack of the Tiger" and "Arctic Adventure". Intended to boost US syndication sales, the film was one of several Anderson anthologies to be released in the 1980s under the promotional banner "Super Space Theater". "The Most Special Agent" was re-edited to remove its framing sequences, thus giving the impression that Joe's theft of the MiG-242 is a real mission rather than a fiction. The British Board of Film Classification rated the film PG, though the episodes are individually rated U.

During the 1990s, Joe 90 appeared as a comic strip in the Funday Times. Strips from the discontinued Joe 90 Top Secret were reprinted in a new publication, Joe 90, which was launched to tie in with the 1994 BBC repeats. After seven issues, this merged into Fleetway's Thunderbirds comic.

In 2001, three Joe 90-themed "trailers" were filmed to accompany the BBC nostalgia series I Love The '90s. Each of these depicts Joe entering the BIG RAT and receiving the brain pattern of a 1990s household name, from Liam Gallagher to Vic Reeves to Garth (played by Dana Carvey) from the film Wayne's World. The trailers are included as a special feature on the Joe 90 Region 2 DVD box set.

=== Unmade film ===
By the 1980s, the rights to the ITC productions belonged to PolyGram Television. They were later sold to Carlton International and then Granada International, which merged with Carlton in 2004 to form ITV Global Entertainment, a division of ITV plc. In the 1990s, PolyGram proposed a live-action film adaptation of Joe 90. In 2003, Variety reported that a film version was in the planning stages with Disney producing.

The film remains undeveloped. In 2005, while discussing obtaining remake rights from Granada, Anderson said: "We have regular meetings and although they are very polite and very nice, nothing ever happens." He died in 2012.
