= Keith Wilson (production designer) =

British production designer

- Born: 19 September 1941
- Died: 6 July 2011 (aged 69)
- Education: Medway College of Art, Rochester
- Occupations: Production designer, art director
- Years active: 1961–2007

Keith George Wilson (19 September 1941 – 6 July 2011) was a British production designer of television and film.

== Life and career ==
After studying theatre design at the Medway College of Art, Rochester, Wilson began his career at AP Films (later Century 21 Productions) in the early 1960s, working as an art department assistant on Fireball XL5 and subsequent Gerry Anderson productions. For the production of Joe 90 and The Secret Service, Wilson took over from Bob Bell as Century 21's art director. In the 1970s, he was an uncredited costume designer on UFO and devised sets for Space: 1999 and Star Maidens.

Not wanting to be typecast as a science fiction designer, in the late 1970s Wilson began working in other genres of feature films. He continued to work as a production designer until the 2000s. His final production design credit was The Hills Have Eyes 2 (2007). He died on 6 July 2011, aged 69.

== Film and TV credits ==
- The Hills Have Eyes 2 (2007)
- The Ten Commandments (2007)
- A Christmas Carol (TV film, 2004)
- The Blackwater Lightship (TV film, 2004)
- Dinotopia (TV miniseries, 2002)
- Victoria & Albert (TV miniseries, 2001)
- In the Beginning (TV miniseries, 2000)
- Mary, Mother of Jesus (TV film, 1999)
- The Seventh Scroll (TV miniseries, 1999)
- Miracle at Midnight (TV film, 1998)
- Oliver Twist (TV film, 1997)
- The Apocalypse Watch (TV film, 1997)
- Supply & Demand (TV series, 1997)
- The Little Riders (TV film, 1996)
- The Governor (TV series, 1995)
- The Old Curiosity Shop (TV series, 1995)
- Remember (TV series, 1993)
- Stalin (TV film, 1992)
- Fergie & Andrew: Behind the Palace Doors (TV film, 1992)
- L'Amérique en otage (TV series, 1991)
- Great Expectations (TV miniseries, 1989)
- The Lady and the Highwayman (TV film, 1989)
- Steal the Sky (1988)
- A Hazard of Hearts (TV film, 1987)
- The Lion of Africa (1987)
- Gulag (TV film, 1985)
- Out of the Darkness (TV film, 1985)
- Exploits at West Poley (TV series, 1985)
- Friday Film Special: Haunters of the Deep (1984)
- Slayground (1983)
- Memoirs of a Survivor (1981)
- Riding High (1981)
- Yesterday's Hero (1979)
- A Man Called Intrepid (TV miniseries, 1979)
- International Velvet (1978)
- Space: 1999 (TV series, 48 episodes, 1975–1978)
- The New Avengers (TV series, 6 episodes, 1977)
- Star Maidens (TV series, 13 episodes, 1976)
- Madhouse (1974) – set dresser
- UFO (TV series, 1970)
- The Secret Service (TV series, 1969)
- Captain Scarlet and the Mysterons (TV series, 6 episodes, 1967)
- Thunderbirds Are Go (1966)

== Awards ==
Wilson won an Emmy for Outstanding Individual Achievement in Art Direction for a Miniseries or a Special for the TV film Stalin (1992). He had been nominated for Outstanding Art Direction for a Miniseries or a Special for Great Expectations (1989). He later received a CableACE Award for Art Direction in a Dramatic Special or Series/Movie or Miniseries for The Old Curiosity Shop (1995).
