= The Secret Service =

1969 British science fiction TV series

- Genre: Science fiction
- Created by: Gerry & Sylvia Anderson
- Voices of: Keith Alexander; Sylvia Anderson; Gary Files; David Healy; Stanley Unwin; Jeremy Wilkin; David Graham
- Music by: Barry Gray
- Country of origin: United Kingdom
- Original language: English
- No. of series: 1
- No. of episodes: 13

Production
- Executive producer: Reg Hill
- Producer: David Lane
- Cinematography: Paddy Seale; Julien Lugrin
- Editors: Alan Killick; Len Cleal; Norman A. Cole
- Running time: 25 minutes
- Production company: Century 21 Television Productions
- Budget: £50,000 per episode

Original release
- Network: ITV
- Release: 21 September – 14 December 1969

The Secret Service is a 1969 British science fiction television series created by Gerry and Sylvia Anderson and filmed by their production company, Century 21, for ITC Entertainment. It follows the exploits of Father Stanley Unwin, a puppet character voiced by, and modelled on, the comedian of the same name. Outwardly an eccentric vicar, Unwin is secretly an agent of BISHOP, a division of British Intelligence that counters criminal and terrorist threats. Assisted by fellow agent Matthew Harding, Unwin's missions involve frequent use of the Minimiser, a device capable of shrinking people and objects to facilitate covert operations. In hostile situations, Unwin spouts a form of gibberish (based on the real Unwin's nonsense language, "Unwinese") to distract the enemy.

The Secret Service was the last Anderson series to be made using a form of electronic marionette puppetry called "Supermarionation". This technique was combined with scale model effects sequences and – uniquely for an Anderson puppet series – extensive footage of live actors in long shot. The move towards non-puppet live action was influenced by Gerry Anderson, who wanted to increase the realism of Supermarionation. Filming began in August 1968 and ended with the completion of the thirteenth episode in January 1969 after Lew Grade, Century 21's owner and financial backer, responded negatively to a test screening and cancelled the production. Grade believed that the inclusion of Unwinese had made it impossible to sell the series to the American market.

The series was transmitted on three of the ITV network's regional franchises and has not been repeated since 1975. Critical response has been mixed, with verdicts ranging from the Andersons' "forgotten gem" to their "one flop". Commentators have questioned the wisdom of hiring Unwin, arguing that his gibberish had too little comic value to sustain viewer interest. However, the series has been praised for the writing of its supporting characters. The Secret Service was Gerry Anderson's final puppet series until Terrahawks in the 1980s.

== Premise ==
The Secret Service follows the exploits of Father Stanley Unwin, the parish priest of an English village. Outwardly an eccentric middle-aged vicar, Unwin moonlights as an operative of the intelligence agency BISHOP ("British Intelligence Service Headquarters, Operation Priest"). He is stationed at his vicarage with fellow BISHOP agent Matthew Harding, who when not assisting Unwin on missions affects a country accent and serves as the Father's verger and gardener. Supporting characters include The Bishop, head of BISHOP and Unwin's superior, Blake, a junior BISHOP operative, and Mrs Appleby, Unwin's housekeeper, who is unaware of Unwin and Matthew's double life as spies.

Prior to the series, Professor Humbert invented the Minimiser, a device capable of shrinking people or objects to one third of their normal size. When Humbert died it was inherited by Unwin, who conceals it inside a large book. The device is regularly used on Matthew, who is reduced to a height of two feet (61 cm) to enable him to carry out covert reconnaissance where any normal-sized person would be noticed. (In this way, the puppet is shown to interact with life-sized sets and live actors whose faces are kept out of shot.) Occasionally it is also used to shrink enemies, literally bringing them down to Matthew's size.

Unwin carries the miniaturised Matthew around in a specially adapted briefcase, which can open from the inside and contains field equipment such as a periscope. During missions, the agents communicate via earpiece transceivers, with Unwin's disguised as his hearing aid. Their primary mode of transport is a revamped 1917 Ford Model T called Gabriel, which can reach speeds over 50 miles per hour (80 km/h). If challenged by law enforcement or enemy agents, Unwin spouts a form of gibberish to confuse the opposition and cover for Matthew.

While most of the Supermarionation series are set in the future, the events of The Secret Service take place in the then-present day. The episodes "Errand of Mercy" and "The Deadly Whisper" are respectively set on 3 February 1969 and 24 May 1969. Gerry Anderson biographers Simon Archer and Marcus Hearn argue that the setting is ambiguous: they believe it to be "sometime in the near future" but note that the world of The Secret Service sees "Morris Minors negotiate leafy country roads while space-age helijets patrol the skies", ultimately concluding that the series is so fantastic that it "isn't set in the real world at all."

=== Episodes ===
No.	Title	Directed by	Written by	Original air date	Prod. code
1	"A Case for the Bishop"	Alan Perry	Gerry & Sylvia Anderson	21 September 1969	1
Agents of the rogue state of Dreisenberg raid the Healey Automation plant and steal the revolutionary XK20 computer. British Intelligence fear that the Dreisenberg ambassador will invoke his diplomatic immunity to smuggle the device out of the country. Father Unwin and Matthew set off in Gabriel to recapture the XK20.
2	"A Question of Miracles"	Leo Eaton	Donald James	28 September 1969	2
Explosions at desalination plants in Africa and Burgossa point to sabotage. Rushing to the last surviving facility in Port Trennick, Unwin and Matthew find themselves in a race against time to prevent its destruction.
3	"To Catch A Spy"	Brian Heard	Pat Dunlop	5 October 1969	4
Convict George Gray breaks out of prison and makes contact with Sir Humphrey Burton, who has promised him passage out of Britain aboard a submarine. Unwin is assigned to intercept the pair at Kew Gardens and capture them with the aid of the Minimiser.
4	"The Feathered Spies"	Ian Spurrier	Tony Barwick	12 October 1969	3
The development of the new XK4 fighter plane has been jeopardised by industrial spy De Groot, who has blackmailed ornithologist John Masden into fitting cameras to his domesticated pigeons to carry out illicit surveillance. Investigating, Unwin and Matthew learn that De Groot plans to use the pigeons to bomb Crayfield Airbase.
5	"Last Train to Bufflers Halt"	Alan Perry	Tony Barwick	19 October 1969	5
As part of a criminal operation to seize £1 million in bank notes en route to London, the train carrying the shipment is diverted to the disused Buffler's Halt Station. Unwin and Matthew help to subdue the gang responsible. However, on the way back up the line, stationmaster Albert Hobson realises that he cannot stop the train, which is travelling at 80 miles per hour (130 km/h).
6	"Hole in One"	Brian Heard	Shane Rimmer	26 October 1969	8
When the G9 orbital satellite warning system is sabotaged, the evidence points to General Brompton, to whom Unwin relays false intelligence during a golf match. Spying on Brompton's henchmen Kromer and Blake, Unwin learns that the golf balls contain miniature recording devices. The fate of the satellites rests on Unwin's success in scoring a hole in one.
7	"Recall to Service"	Peter Anderson	Pat Dunlop	2 November 1969	7
Unwin and Matthew investigate what appears to be a case of sabotage when the AquaTank, a new military robot of the World Army, develops a mechanical fault. As NATO officials attend a demonstration of the AquaTank's capabilities, suspicion falls on Captain Mitchell when he instructs computer expert Professor Graham to program the tank to fire on the officials' bunker.
8	"Errand of Mercy"	Leo Eaton	Tony Barwick	9 November 1969	6
Unwin falls ill from heatstroke and recovers at his vicarage. After reading a newspaper article about an epidemic in Africa, he has a surreal dream in which he and Matthew are tasked with ferrying medical supplies to Bishopsville in a flying Gabriel. When they are captured by native tribesmen for human sacrifice, Unwin must save himself and Matthew with the help of his gobbledygook.
9	"The Deadly Whisper"	Leo Eaton	Donald James	16 November 1969	11
Professor Soames has invented an ultrasonic vibrational rifle capable of destroying armoured vehicles. Plotting to use the weapon to shoot down an experimental aircraft, criminal Mark Slater and his gang kidnap Soames' daughter, Anne. With the professor's help, Unwin and Matthew rescue Anne and then set out to foil Slater.
10	"The Cure"	Leo Eaton	Pat Dunlop	23 November 1969	10
While racing to apprehend a foreign assassin called Sakov, who has checked in to Greenways health clinic on the pretext of receiving experimental therapy, Unwin is unaware that his target has designs on the new additive chemical GK2, which when mixed with water produces a lethal compound as combustible as high-octane fuel.
11	"School for Spies"	Ken Turner	Donald James	30 November 1969	9
The Bishop orders Unwin and Matthew to investigate the sabotage of several military installations. After tracking down Brother Gregory, a Christian layman who was involved in a car accident near the scene of the latest attack, Unwin slips the miniaturised Matthew into a briefcase belonging to Gregory's associate Brother Thomas. Arriving at Pennydridge Seminary, Harding discovers that the brothers are actually mercenaries who answer to their own Archdeacon.
12	"May-Day, May-Day!"	Alan Perry	Bob Kesten	7 December 1969	12
Unwin and Harding are assigned to protect the King of Muldovia, who is in London to sign an oil rights treaty. The Muldovian Prince wants the throne for himself, but his attempt to have the King assassinated is foiled when his hitman is startled by the miniaturised Matthew and falls to his death from an open window. The Prince then hides a bomb inside a toy bear intended for the King's son.
13	"More Haste Less Speed"	Ken Turner	Tony Barwick	14 December 1969	13
Lord and Lady Hazlewell, their associate Spiker and ex-convict Mullins meet at Hazlewell Manor in a conspiracy to print forged US dollar bills. The Hazlewells inherited one of two counterfeiting plates from their late father; when the second plate is revealed to be hidden at Greenacre Farm, the Hazlewells, Spiker and Mullins turn on each other in a race to claim the prize. Unwin and Matthew set out to beat them to it.

== Voice cast ==
With the exception of Unwin, all voice actors on The Secret Service had supplied voices for earlier Supermarionation series. The Secret Service featured the voices of:

- Stanley Unwin as Father Stanley Unwin (aged 57), a parish priest in rural England who carries out top-secret missions for BISHOP (British Intelligence Service Headquarters, Operation Priest). Due to the realistic vicar costume that he wore on location, passing members of the public often mistook Unwin for a real vicar.
- Gary Files as Matthew Harding (aged 28), Unwin's partner in BISHOP as well as gardener of his vicarage. Files fondly remembered his time on The Secret Service, stating that he enjoyed voicing Harding more than Captain Magenta in Captain Scarlet. He made significant contributions to Harding's characterisation, devising the character's rural accent himself: "It just seemed so right for the character. Then once I had the voice, the rest of Matthew followed."
- Sylvia Anderson as Mrs Appleby (aged 55), Unwin's housekeeper, who is kept ignorant of Unwin and Harding's double life.
- Jeremy Wilkin as The Bishop (aged 52), a high-ranking British Intelligence official and head of BISHOP, based in Whitehall.
- Keith Alexander as Agent Blake, a cautious junior agent of BISHOP, who has speaking roles in three episodes ("A Question of Miracles", "Last Train to Bufflers Halt" and "The Cure").

Supporting character voices were provided by all of the regular cast except Unwin, with additional contributions by David Healy and (for the final two episodes, "May-Day, May-Day!" and "More Haste Less Speed") David Graham.

== Production ==
=== Development ===
I thought it would be a great idea if I cast [Unwin] in the role of a secret agent; he played the part of a priest and he had his own church, hence the title – the double meaning – The Secret Service. If he ever got into a difficult spot, say the police had stopped him, he would talk to them in his Unwinese and that would fox the police totally ... So that was the gimmick.

— Gerry Anderson on the series' premise

After the completion of Joe 90, producer Gerry Anderson decided to create another espionage series. This would feature an English village as the home of its spy protagonist, an eccentric parish priest. Anderson hired Stanley Unwin to voice the character (which was ultimately also sculpted on and named after him) after unexpectedly meeting Unwin at Pinewood Studios while the comedian was completing dubbing work on the film Chitty Chitty Bang Bang. Unwin's fee was set at £250 per episode.

Unwin was the creator of "Unwinese", a form of gibberish that was outwardly unintelligible but retained some aspects of meaning. Anderson remembered Unwin's radio and TV performances using the language and thought that it would suit the character of a secret agent, also reasoning that it would have comic value if shown to confuse the enemy. In his biography, he explained: "As far as I was concerned, Stanley came first and then the idea had to accommodate him. It wasn't that the story called for someone who could speak gobbledygook, it was a question of how we could fit him into the storyline." Due to the esoteric nature of Unwinese, the writers briefed Unwin on the storylines and left space in their scripts for him to draft all the gibberish dialogue himself. Shane Rimmer, who wrote the episode "Hole in One", recalled that "A lot of [the dialogue] you had to leave to [Unwin]. You gave him a line of patter that's going to work with what he does. Because he was such a bizarre character, you felt you could really go all the way with him: you could practically do anything."

The premise of The Secret Service was inspired partly by the Joe 90 episode "The Unorthodox Shepherd", which features an elderly and seemingly half-deaf vicar who is covering up a money forging operation on the grounds of his church. Archer and Marcus Hearn believe that Joe 90 also had a broader influence on its successor, writing that The Secret Service "continues the espionage theme of Joe 90 in a range of adventures that depict a Britain under siege from despicable foreign agents intent on stealing its secrets."

=== Puppets ===
I came up with the idea of getting Stanley Unwin to do all the walking shots, and driving shots in his Model T Ford that he had. If, for example, you had a sequence where Stanley Unwin would arrive at a building in his Model T, he would drive it down the street, up to the kerb, turn the engine off, get out, walk down the path, and as he opened the door, you'd cut to the reverse angle and that would be the puppet of Stanley Unwin.

— Gerry Anderson on the series' hybrid format

After Joe 90, Anderson had originally intended to abandon Supermarionation puppets altogether in favour of using live actors. For reasons of economy, he eventually opted for a hybrid format that blended scale puppet sequences with footage of live actors filmed in full-sized surroundings. On the style of the puppets – which, after Thunderbirds, had been re-designed with realistic body proportions – Anderson said that Century 21's ever-improving sculpting techniques had produced "imitations of human beings" that made the company's puppet series "like live-action shows but with unconvincing actors". To avoid the long-running problem of making the puppets walk convincingly, the series often used footage of live actors in long shot for scenes that required characters to move.

Century 21 had first experimented with extensive live-action location shooting during the production of Thunderbird 6 (1968). "The Unorthodox Shepherd" had also been filmed partly on location. Stephen La Rivière notes the contrast between the format of The Secret Service and those of earlier Supermarionation series, whose live-action elements were usually limited to occasional shots of human hands performing actions too complex for the puppets, such as operating machinery.

The only new puppets created for The Secret Service were those of Unwin, his housekeeper Mrs Appleby (which sculptor Christine Glanville based on her mother) and The Bishop. Supporting characters were played by puppets recycled from Joe 90 and Captain Scarlet; the Matthew Harding puppet was originally made for the Captain Scarlet episode "Treble Cross" while Blake was played by the Captain Scarlet puppet himself. La Rivière describes the puppet Unwin as "one of the most impressive artistic feats" to be produced by the Century 21 puppet workshop, calling the likeness "uncanny". It is possible to directly compare the puppet with the real-life Unwin in every episode as the opening credits show the real Unwin's face, rather than the puppet's.

=== Filming ===
The crew built two scale models of Gabriel, Father Unwin's Ford Model T.

The series was intended to run for 26 episodes. After pre-production in the summer, filming began on 20 August 1968. According to director Ken Turner, the series was difficult to film as it comprised three elements: puppet and effects filming, both carried out at Century 21's studios on the Slough Trading Estate, as well as location filming. The Secret Service also differed from earlier Supermarionation series in that episodes were structured around their location work, which had to be completed before the studio filming could commence. Turner explained: "We felt that somebody had to take the location stuff by the balls, get it shot and then hand it over to the director to fit his puppet stuff in. I suppose that seemed a bit back to front but with that programme it was what worked out best."

Producer David Lane remembered that making the series was "an absolute nightmare" due to the wide range of design scales used: "You can imagine the problems. You're shrinking [the Matthew Harding puppet] to puppet size on a puppet set and then you're having to build it in live-action size for the puppet because he's supposed to be a small man in a full-sized environment. And then you're using the 'shrunken' puppet in a full set."

Filming locations included a house in Burnham, Buckinghamshire as Father Unwin's vicarage, Centre Point as the British Intelligence building in London and Horse Guards as the headquarters of BISHOP. Wexham Park Hospital appears in the episode "School for Spies", while the Century 21 Studios themselves are featured in the opening of the first episode, "A Case for the Bishop".

As the series is set in the present day, the special effects team, headed by Derek Meddings, were not required to design many futuristic-looking vehicles. Their main tasks were to build the Ford Model T, Gabriel, create miniature replicas of vehicles and settings common to the 1960s, and produce the optical effects for Matthew Harding's "minimisation". Three versions of Gabriel were built: one full-sized car and two models in differing scales. The car was fitted with belt-driven electric motors, an upholstered interior, a folding roof and a radio control mechanism so that it could be driven remotely. The location work using the car was conducted in and around Burnham Beeches during the autumn of 1968 and proved challenging as filming was often disrupted by low light levels. On some days only two minutes of footage were recorded. Technician "Wag" Evans, who was responsible for operating the car's radio control, remembered "standing out of shot and having to 'drive' [the car] down the road while it was out of view. Often I didn't know where it was, or where and when it had stopped." A crew member with a large cushion would be on hand to bring the car to a halt whenever it went out of control.

Selected filming locations
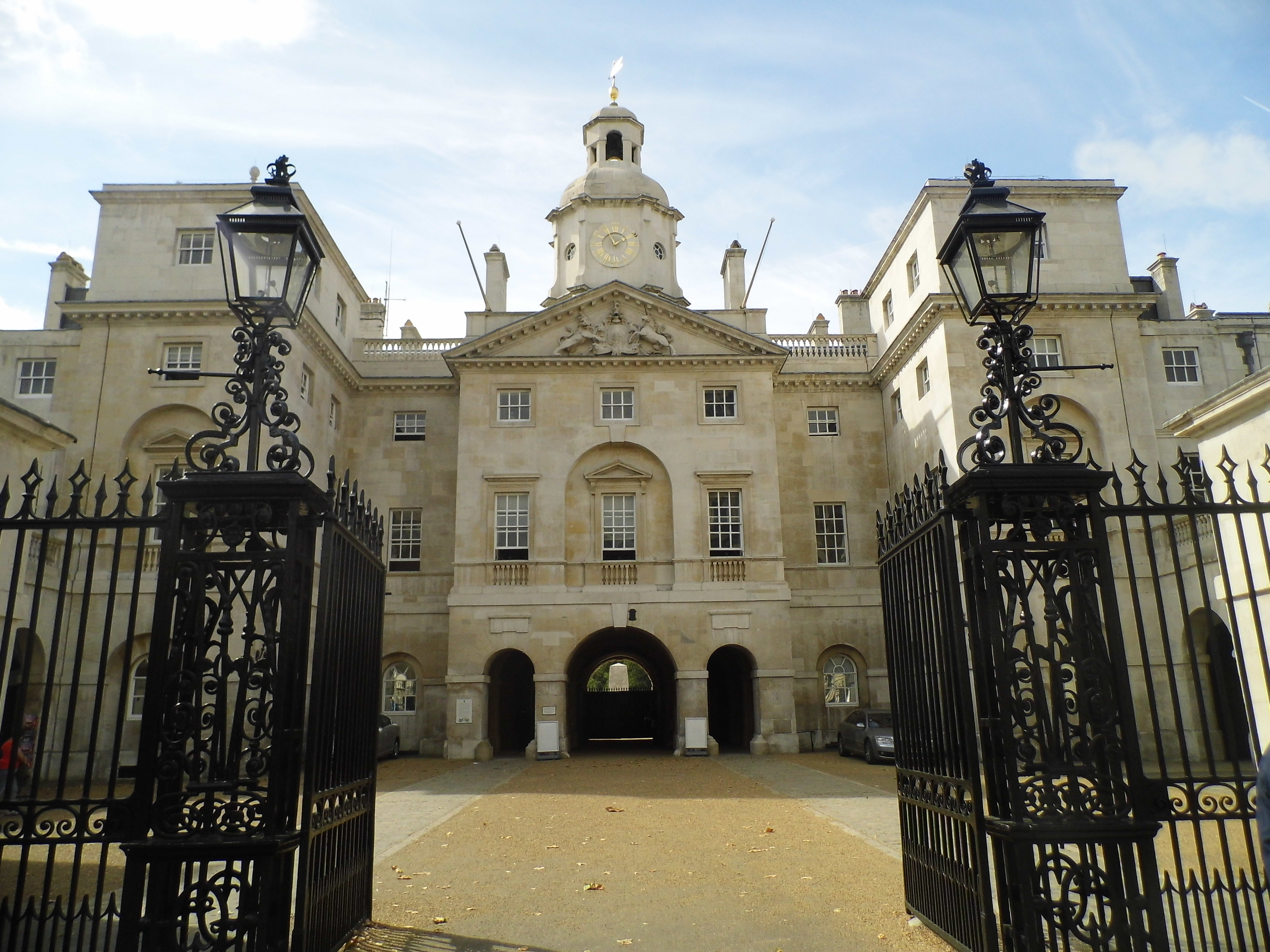
Horse Guards, London (multiple episodes)

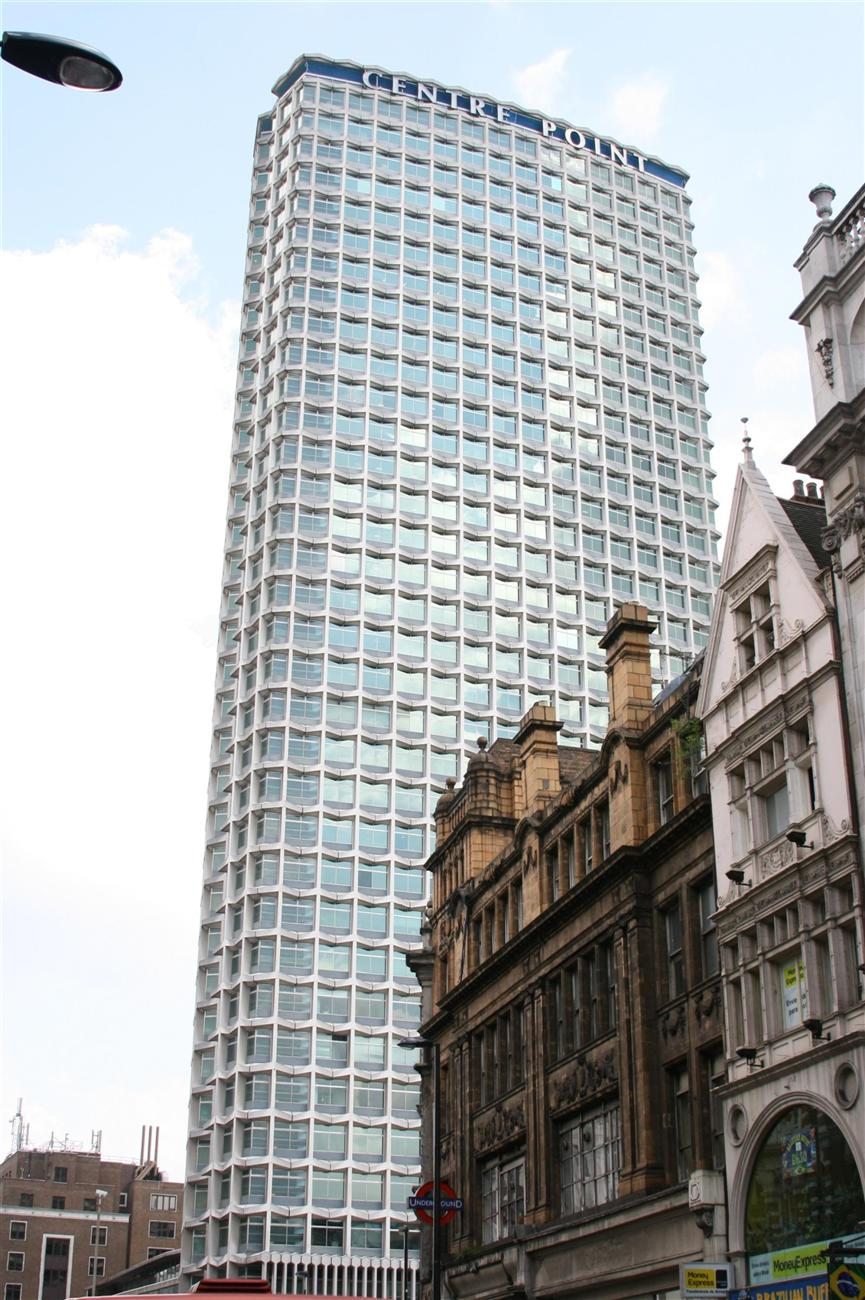
Centre Point, London (multiple episodes)

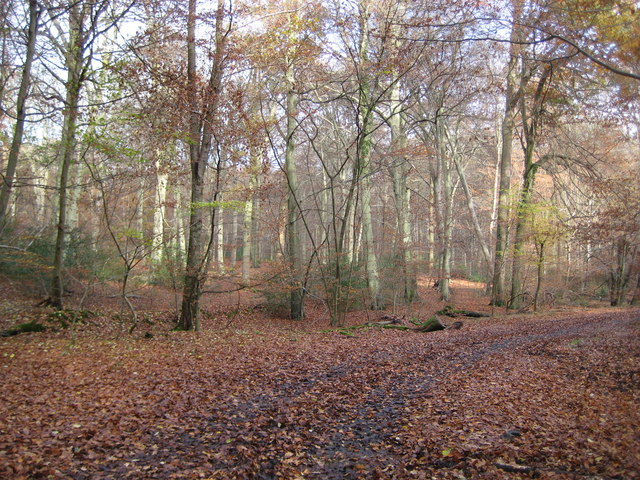
Burnham Beeches (multiple episodes)

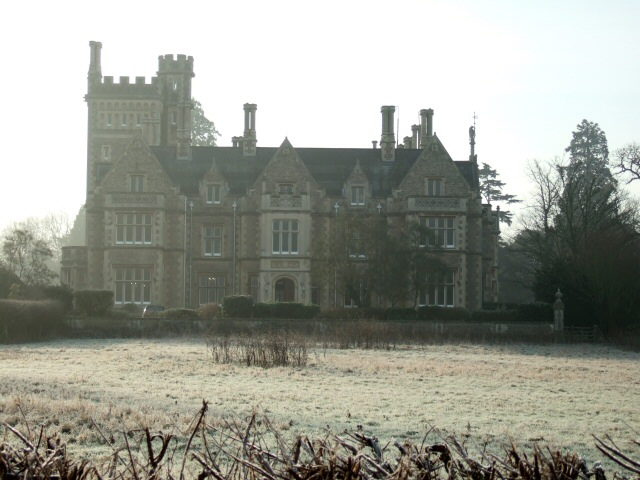
New Lodge, Winkfield (episode "School for Spies")

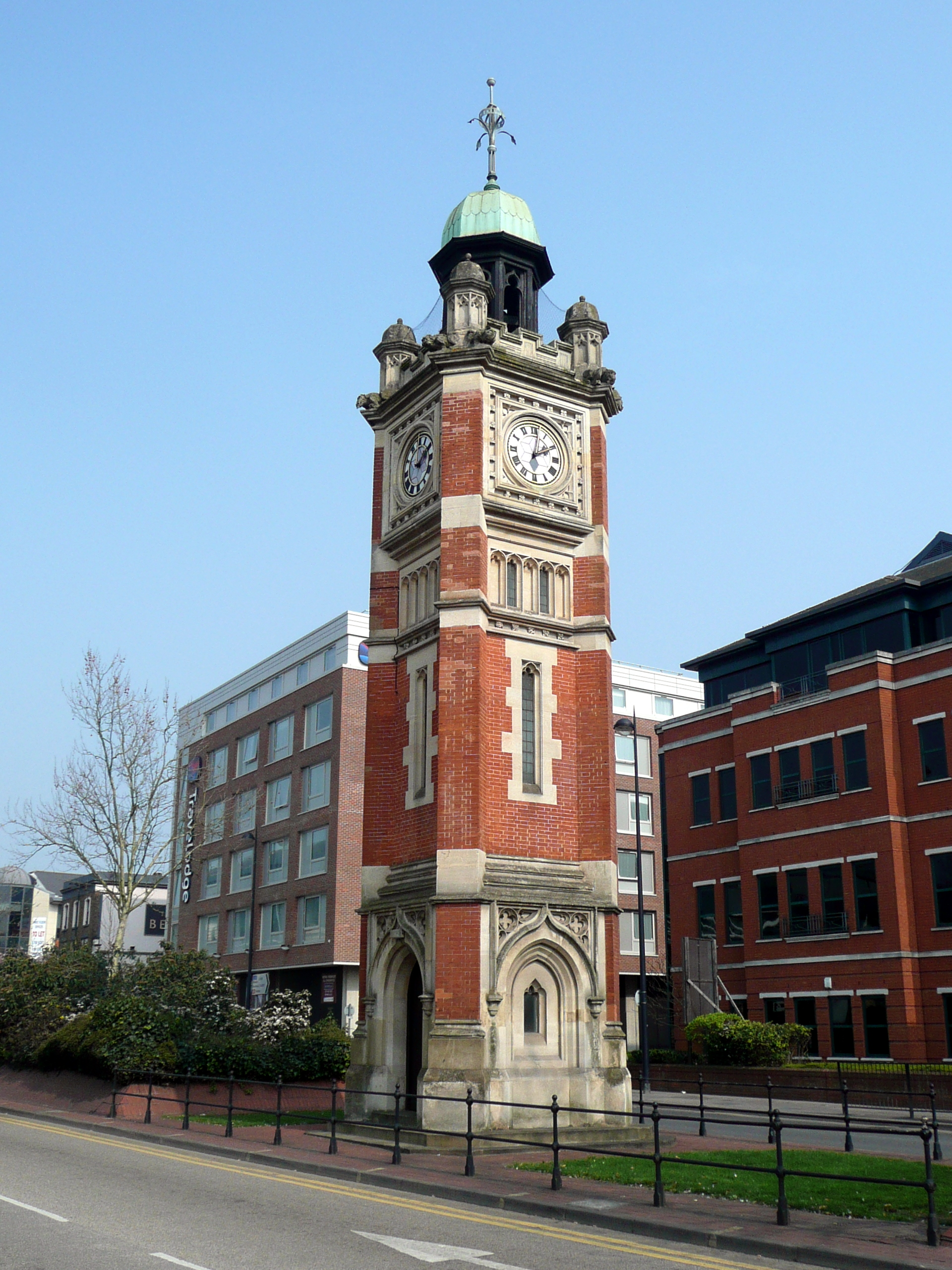
Jubilee Clock Tower, Maidenhead ("Last Train to Bufflers Halt")

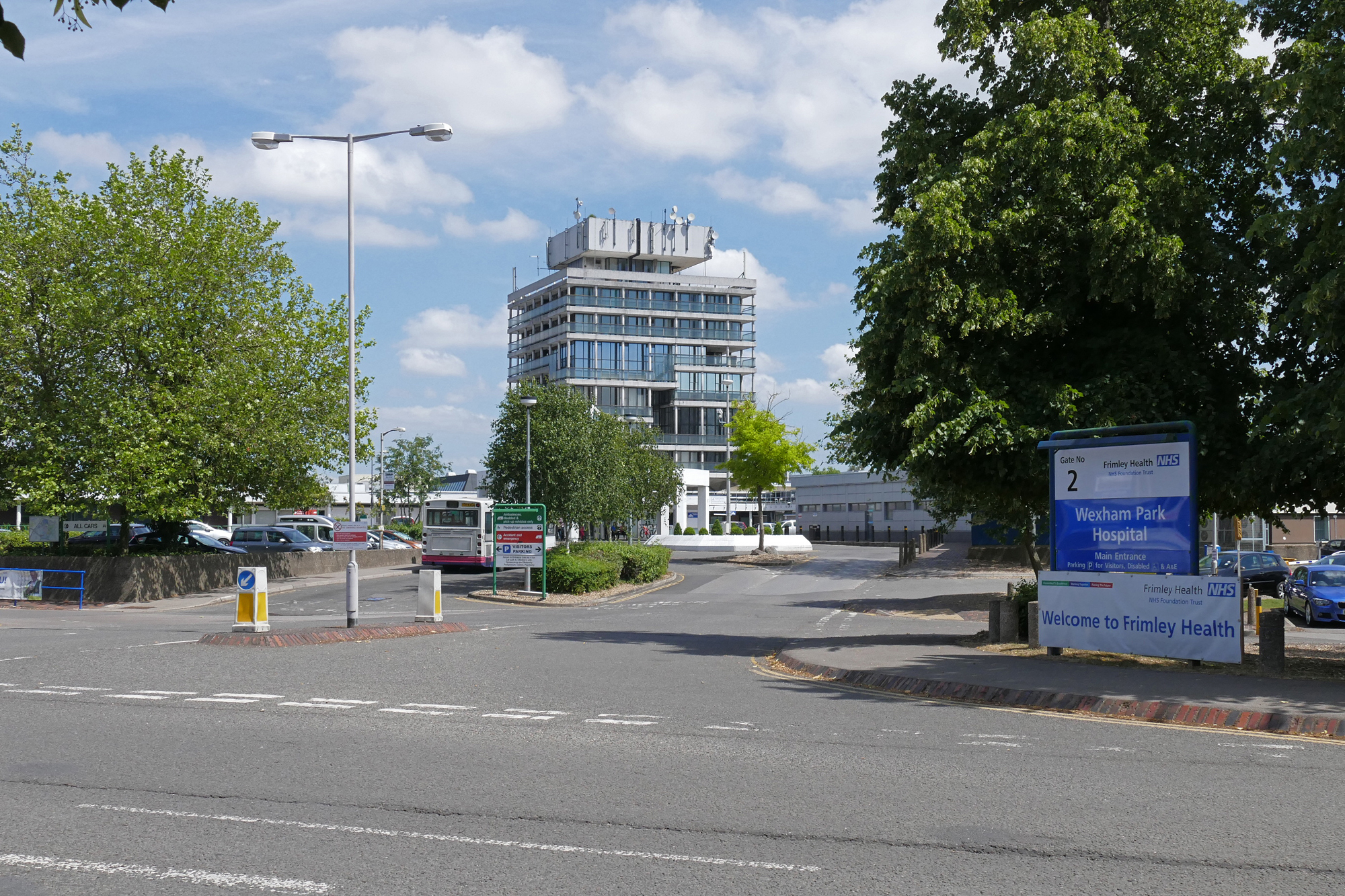
Wexham Park Hospital ("School for Spies")

=== Titles and music ===
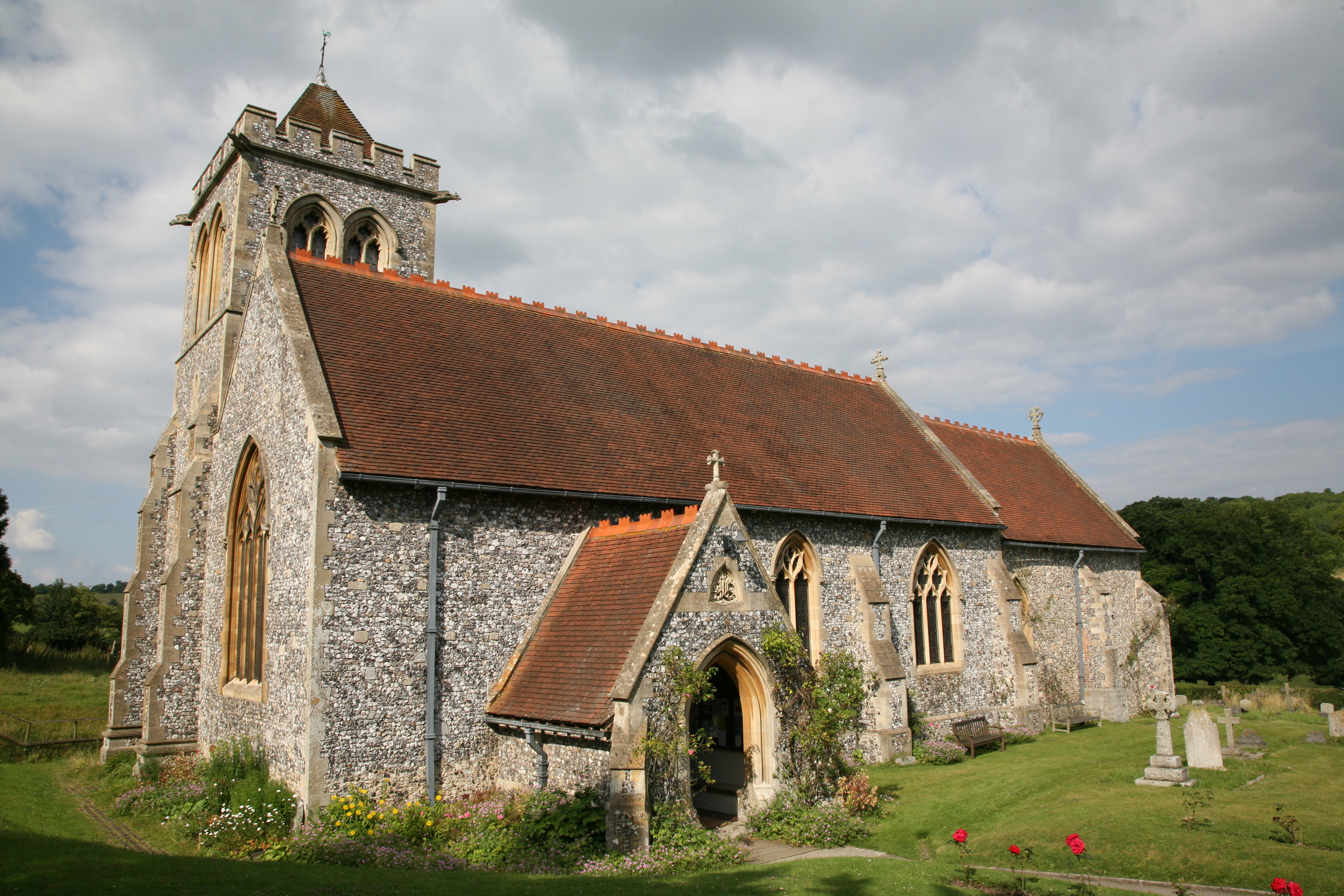
The opening and closing titles feature St Michael and All Angels Church, Hughenden.

Both the opening and closing titles feature shots of St Michael and All Angels Church in Hughenden Valley, Buckinghamshire, which doubles as the church of Father Unwin. The title sequence begins with a zoom-in shot of the church against a backdrop of fields. This features the title graphic sliding down into view and gradually filling the screen – an effect was inspired by traditional imagery of angels descending from Heaven.

Barry Gray's theme music was his first Century 21 composition since Stingray to include vocals. He developed the initial concept into a three-part fugue in the style of Bach. Accompanied by a church organ and percussion instruments, the vocals were intended to be performed by The Swingle Singers, but their prospective fee was too high for the music budget. Instead, Gray hired the Mike Sammes Singers, who had sung the Supercar theme several years earlier, to provide an imitation of the Swingles' style. The theme was recorded in a four-hour studio session on 16 October 1968 and is described by Archer and Hearn as a "glorious piece of choral lunacy".

As well as the theme, Gray recorded incidental music for four episodes in three additional four-hour sessions. The first of these was held at Olympic Studios in Barnes, London on 12 November 1968, when an orchestra of 29 instrumentalists performed the music for the first episode, "A Case for the Bishop". Recording for "A Question of Miracles" took place on 11 December at Gray's private studios with an ensemble of eight. The other two episodes to include original scores are "The Feathered Spies" and "Last Train To Bufflers Halt"; the remaining episodes use music recycled from the other four, as well as from Century 21's earlier series (in particular, Captain Scarlet and Joe 90). The final recording session was held on 10 January 1969.

In 2007, Fanderson released the series' soundtrack on CD exclusively for its members. In 2022, Silva Screen released it on CD for the public.

=== Cancellation ===
"Cut! Cut! Cut! Stop! Put the lights up!" cried out Lew Grade, leaping to his feet. Gerry Anderson was startled by this outburst, just as he had been by Lew's reaction to Thunderbirds four years before. However, this time Lew's response was vastly different, as Gerry explains: "'Cancel the show, Gerry. Just finish off the first thirteen.' I said, 'Why?' and he said, 'They'll never understand [Father Unwin] in America!' I said, 'But, Lew, that's the whole point, they're not supposed to understand.' He said, 'No, no, no, no!'"

— Stephen La Rivière (2009)

Lew Grade, Century 21's financial backer, ordered Anderson to end filming on The Secret Service during a test screening of the pilot episode, "A Case for the Bishop", in December 1968. Objecting to the series' concept on the basis that American audiences would be confused by the Unwinese, Grade capped the production at the thirteen episodes that either had been completed or were shooting at the time of the screening. Anderson countered that a nonsense language such as Unwinese is inherently incomprehensible, and questioned Grade's reasoning for the cancellation, stating that "I chose Stanley Unwin because you are not supposed to understand Stanley Unwin, even if you're British. I thought if the Americans don't understand him either, what's the difference?"

However, Anderson conceded that Grade "was not a man you could argue with. If he said "No", you had to accept that he wouldn't change his mind." Of Grade's decision, La Rivière conjectures: "No one knows what was running through [his] mind ... but given the ease with which the 'Unwinese' element could have been removed [from] the series, it seems probable that he simply didn't like a lot of what he was seeing." In a move that led to the discontinuation of the Supermarionation format, Anderson and Grade transferred many of Century 21's staff from the company's Slough base to Pinewood Studios, where they would begin work on UFO, the Andersons' first full live-action series.

Having wanted to abandon puppet work and move into live-action, Anderson greeted the cancellation of The Secret Service with optimism, saying of live actors: "I started to think, 'It's amazing! They speak! Their mouths are in sync with their words! And they can walk! And they can pick up things!'" The Century 21 puppet stages closed down on 24 January 1969 on completion of the final episode of The Secret Service, "More Haste Less Speed", whereupon the special effects teams took over the disused space to film the miniature model effects for UFO.

== Broadcast and reception ==
The Secret Service had a very limited distribution compared to earlier Anderson productions. It was originally transmitted by the ITV regional franchises ATV, Granada and Southern, airing on Sundays at the regular time of 5.30 pm. ATV and Southern re-ran the series until 1972 and Granada until 1975. Since then, the series has never been repeated in the UK. As of October 2023, all 13 episodes are available in the UK on the ITVX streaming service.

In 2026, the series became available to stream in the United States on Shout! TV and Tubi.

=== Critical response ===
The Secret Service captures the English whimsy that was making The Avengers such a hit in America, but adds to it the charm of Four Feather Falls, the irony and wit of Fireball XL5 and the technical accomplishments of the later Supermarionation shows. It is the forgotten gem in the Anderson canon, with highlights almost too numerous to mention.

— Simon Archer and Marcus Hearn

Critical reception of The Secret Service has been mixed. Gerry Anderson, however, said that it was his favourite of all the series that he had produced. Leo Eaton, who directed four episodes, described The Secret Service as "just a bit weird" and questioned the effectiveness of Unwin's humour. Production supervisor Desmond Saunders called it "strange", elaborating: "I suppose it was the gobbledygook and the mixture of live action with puppets. It never seemed to me to be a very good idea." Simon Wickes of the website TVCentury21.com suggests that the series was made primarily to bridge the gap between the Andersons' puppet productions and their later efforts in live action. Kif Bowden-Smith of the Transdiffusion website describes the mixing of puppetry and live action as "an experimental format for the following live-action series".

Simon Archer and Marcus Hearn, authors of What Made Thunderbirds Go! The Authorised Biography of Gerry Anderson, write that The Secret Service differs from earlier Anderson series by being less "American-orientated" and featuring fewer action sequences. They regard it as the "most eccentric" of all the Supermarionation productions up to 1969, and the hybrid format as the "natural conclusion" of the filming technique. They especially commend the characterisation of Mrs Appleby, whose ignorance of Unwin and Harding's true occupations adds to the humour: for example, when Unwin speaks into his hearing aid, she deduces that he is simply muttering to himself, not knowing that the device is actually a transceiver for communicating with Harding. Archer and Hearn also praise the episodes "A Question of Miracles", which sees the miniaturised Harding dwarfed by the contents of a picnic basket, and "Last Train to Bufflers Halt", whose plot concerns a runaway freight train.

The puppets and special effects had always worked well together because they existed in the same artificial universe ... By contrast, no such forgiveness is extended when you see a puppet in a car, then cut to a human getting out of the vehicle and walking across the road. The viewers simply find themselves removed from the storytelling, as the brain knows that the shots do not match.

— Stephen La Rivière on the format

Stephen La Rivière favours the episode "More Haste Less Speed": describing the series finale as "wonderfully quirky", he considers the plot about a money-forging scheme to be reminiscent of the "gentler, earlier days of Supercar" and lauds voice actor Keith Alexander for his impression of the elderly Lady Hazlewell. Nevertheless, in his overall assessment of the series, La Rivière asserts that a spy posing as a vicar and driving an antique car would not have appealed to children and that adults would have been disappointed by the series' "traditional espionage format". Ian Fryer of FAB magazine expresses similar views, writing that "very little about The Secret Service has obvious appeal to the traditionally young Supermarionation audience." He notes that the title sequence marked a departure from Supermarionation's "tradition of having a thrilling or suspenseful promise of what was to come", instead "[making] the series look suspiciously like it might be about the life and work of an elderly vicar." Fryer also suggests that prospective foreign buyers were put off by the espionage theme, noting that by the time The Secret Service debuted on British TV, other spy series like The Man from U.N.C.L.E. and The Avengers had already aired their last episodes.

The clerical vocation of the main character also introduces the issue of faith – the series doesn't so much preach any religion as such but rather demonstrates people putting faith in each other. In trusting the eccentric Unwin ... Professor Graham helps to avert the disaster. Unwin circumspectly passes it off as "a miracle of science", avoiding any awkward questions. In several other episodes it's interesting that he implies that his successes (achieved using the science of the Minimiser) are down to divine intervention.

— Paul O'Brien on "Recall to Service"

Writers Chris Drake and Graeme Bassett state that "On paper, at least, the premise seemed irresistible" but view the blending of puppetry and live action as "uneasy". La Rivière is critical of the format, stating that it "requires more than the audience can give in terms of acceptance." He points out that the live-action shots of Lady Hazlewell in "More Haste Less Speed" used a stuntman in drag – an "unintentionally hilarious moment that illustrates beautifully why the live-action inserts didn't work." La Rivière also argues that another factor contributing to the failure of The Secret Service was the frequent re-runs of earlier Anderson series: "... as with anything that is phenomenally popular, the time must come when the audience is satiated and drifts away to something else." Archer and Hearn echo these concerns, writing that Century 21 had become "a bit too successful" in producing a winning format.

John Peel calls The Secret Service a "dismal" effort that "marked the death knell of Supermarionation." He judges the combination of puppetry and live action "completely pointless" and the casting of Unwin not only "bizarre in the extreme" but also ill-considered given that Unwinese "was hardly funny to most people (let alone children)." He adds that despite Grade's fears, the actor's gobbledygook would have been incomprehensible to British and American audiences alike. John Walsh of The Independent challenges the view that the series was weakened by the gobbledygook, arguing that British audiences "quite like not understanding things." Unwin himself praised the series' off-beat tone, defending the inclusion of Unwinese as "an attempt to add a new dimension to the puppet field ... It was a bit bizarre, but then aren't many new ideas a little odd at first?" He also said that the series was perhaps "a little bit before its time".

Of course, the burning question is, does it work? – And one has to answer with an uncomfortable "yes". It does work. But in succeeding to make the puppets "real", the show has lost much of the reason for being a puppet series in the first place. The series might have worked even more successfully had it been a fully-fledged live-action production.

— ToonHound.com on the format

Media historian Nicholas J. Cull, who views The Secret Service as the Andersons' "one flop", calls it an "idiosyncratically British product", adding that through BISHOP the series reflected "the 1960s vogue for stories set in secret organisations with extravagant acronyms". He considers The Secret Service to be one of several Anderson series that "unashamedly capitalised on the Cold War cult of the secret agent whose skills defend the home from enemies unknown", noting that Sakov in "The Cure" is a hostile Russian agent.

Reviewing the episode "Recall to Service" for the fanzine Andersonic, Paul O'Brien describes the plot about the AquaTank – a military robot gone rogue – as "an obvious allegory about the hazards of complete automation". He adds that the pivotal moment comes when Harding returns the AquaTank to manual control: "in other words, the machinery is now subordinate to its creator once again, as it should stay." On the series generally, O'Brien is critical of the puppet cast, noting the persistent absence of female characters and commenting that only female regular, Mrs Appleby, "contributes precisely nil to the plot."

== Other media ==
Two novels based on the series – The Destroyer and The VIP, both written by John William Jennison under the pseudonym "John Theydon" – were published in 1969. In the early 1970s, the weekly children's title Countdown printed a number of Secret Service comic strips, including an origin story.

The series was released on Region 1 DVD in December 2003 by A&E Home Video. This featured digitally-remastered picture and sound as well as bonus materials including an audio commentary by producer David Lane for the first episode, "A Case for the Bishop". The website AllMovie gives the release a feature rating of three-and-a-half stars out of five.

Network DVD followed with a Region 2 DVD in June 2005. It included audio commentaries by Gerry Anderson and PDF transfers of original production documents.
