= David Lane (director) =

British television and film director

- Born: Early 1940s
- Occupations: Film and television director and editor; Television producer
- Years active: 1960s–present
- Employers: AP Films; Clearwater Films
- Organizations: Lane Fabian Jones; Will Vinton Studios; Pineapple Squared Entertainment
- Notable credit(s): Thunderbirds Are Go; Thunderbird 6
- Television: Thunderbirds

David Lane (born early 1940s) is a British television and film director, known for his association with the productions of Gerry and Sylvia Anderson's AP Films.

Originally a TV editor, Lane directed several episodes of Thunderbirds, including "Attack of the Alligators!", followed by the feature film sequels Thunderbirds Are Go (1966) and Thunderbird 6 (1968). He was producer for the later Anderson series Joe 90 and The Secret Service, an episode director for UFO, a technical director for Space: 1999 and an episode director for New Captain Scarlet.

Away from the Anderson productions, Lane was second unit director on 1978's Superman (reuniting him with Anderson effects director Derek Meddings) and the sequels Superman III, Supergirl and Superman IV: The Quest for Peace. His other screen credits include the series Catweazle (as an episode director) and the films Brass Target (as editor), Santa Claus: The Movie (as second unit director) and Muppet Treasure Island (as second unit director).

In the 1970s, Lane, joined Clearwater Films as a commercials director. In 1990, he and his long-term business partner Michèle Fabian-Jones co-founded production company Lane Fabian Jones. He worked for Will Vinton Studios from 1996 to 1998.

In 2006, Lane co-founded Pineapple Squared Entertainment with Fabian-Jones and Thomas the Tank Engine & Friends director David Mitton. He was working with Mitton on a computer-animated adventure series called Adventures on Orsum Island until Mitton's death in 2008, at which point production was discontinued.
