= David Healy (actor) =

American actor (1929–1995)

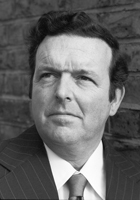
- David Healy in 1971
- Born: May 15, 1929; New York City, U.S.
- Died: October 25, 1995 (aged 66); London, England
- Occupation: Actor
- Years active: 1963–1995
- Spouse: Peggy Walsh
- Children: 2

David Healy (May 15, 1929 – October 25, 1995) was an American actor who appeared in British and American television shows.

== Early life ==
Healy was born in New York City to a Texan mother and an Australian father.

== Career ==
Healy's television credits included voices for the Supermarionation series Captain Scarlet and the Mysterons, Joe 90 and The Secret Service, as well as parts in UFO, The Troubleshooters, Randall and Hopkirk (Deceased), Department S, Strange Report, Dickens of London, Space Precinct, and Dallas. He also starred as Dr. Watson opposite Ian Richardson's Sherlock Holmes in the 1983 TV film of The Sign of Four.

His big screen credits included The Double Man (1967), Only When I Larf (1968), Assignment K (1968), Isadora (1968), Patton (1970), Lust for a Vampire (1971), Madame Sin (1972), Embassy (1972), Endless Night (1972), Twilight's Last Gleaming (1977), Winterspelt (1979), Supergirl (1984), and Haunted Honeymoon (1986). He also gave uncredited performances in the James Bond films You Only Live Twice (1967) and Diamonds Are Forever (1971).

In 1983, Healy received the Laurence Olivier Award for Best Supporting Actor for his role in Guys and Dolls during the 1982 theatre season. His performance of "Nicely Nicely Johnson" was praised as "show-stopping" as he sang "Sit Down You're Rockin' the Boat". He performed a mid-show encore each night. In late 1980s he played the character of Buddy Plummer in the original London run of the Stephen Sondheim musical Follies at the Shaftesbury Theatre.

== Personal life ==
Healy married Peggy Walsh and had two sons, William and Tim. He was a devoted amateur polo player and his wife was the manager of Ham Polo Club in London. Both of his sons remain polo players and the David Healy Trophy is still played for in his memory.

Healy died following a heart operation on October 25, 1995, in London.

== Filmography ==
- Espionage (TV series) ('Do You Remember Leo Winters', episode) (1964) – American Sailor
- Be My Guest (1965) – Milton Bass
- The Double Man (1967) – Halstead
- You Only Live Twice (1967) – Houston Radar Operator (uncredited)
- Assignment K (1968) – David
- Inspector Clouseau (1968) – Villain in TV Western (uncredited)
- Only When I Larf (1968) – Jones
- Isadora (1968) – Chicago Theatre Manager
- Patton (1970) – Clergyman
- Lust for a Vampire (1971) – Raymond Pelley
- Diamonds Are Forever (1971) – Vandenburg Launch Director (uncredited)
- Jason King (TV series) (episode "Flamingoes Only Fly on Tuesdays", 1971) – CIA agent
- Madame Sin (1972) – Braden
- Embassy (1972) – Phelan
- Endless Night (1972) – Jason
- Ooh... You Are Awful (1972) – Tourist
- A Touch of Class (1973) – American (uncredited)
- Phase IV (1974) – Radio Announcer (voice, uncredited)
- Stardust (1974)
- Twilight's Last Gleaming (1977) – Maj. Winters
- La Ballade des Dalton (1978) – Joe Dalton (English version, voice)
- Winterspelt (1979) – Pfc Foster
- The Ninth Configuration (1980) – 1st General
- Sherlock Holmes: the Sign of Four (1983) – Dr. Watson
- Supergirl (1984) – Mr. Danvers
- Labyrinth (1986) – Right Door Knocker (voice)
- Haunted Honeymoon (1986) – P.R. Man
- Turnaround (1987) – Sheriff Huddleston
- Puerto Rican Mambo (Not a Musical) (1992) – businessman
- All Men Are Mortal (1995) – movie producer (final film role)
