= Keith Alexander (actor) =

Australian actor (born 1930)

- Born: Keith Alexander Buckley; 3 February 1930 (age 96); Sydney, Australia
- Education: University of Adelaide
- Occupations: Actor, voiceover artist
- Years active: 1949–present

Keith Alexander (born Keith Buckley; sometimes credited as Keith Alexander Buckley) is an Australian actor and voiceover artist.

== Early life ==
Originally from Sydney, Alexander studied engineering and law at the University of Adelaide before deciding to pursue acting as a career.

== Career ==
Initially, Alexander worked extensively in theatre. Disillusioned with the state of Australian politics, in 1965 he moved to London, where he took the professional name "Keith Alexander" as there was already an actor called "Keith Buckley" in the UK.

Due to his specialty in reproducing accents, Alexander is best known for his voice work, especially his work in the UK. His British television credits include Softly, Softly (1966), The New Avengers (1976), Minder (1979) and The Day of the Triffids (1981). On the big screen, he had roles in Submarine X-1 (1968), Superman (1978), Hanover Street (1979) and All About a Prima Ballerina (1980).

Alexander was also featured in productions by Gerry Anderson, beginning with the 1968 puppet film Thunderbird 6 (voicing John Tracy as well as providing the opening narration). He went on to voice the regular role of Sam Loover as well as many guest characters in the TV series Joe 90 (1968–1969). His other Anderson credits were the film Doppelgänger (1969) and the TV series The Secret Service and UFO – the latter, as recurring character Lieutenant Keith Ford.

Alexander also spent time in the United States, where he worked on The Ed Sullivan Show providing the English-language dub of the Italian puppet mouse Topo Gigio. The role of Gigio gave Alexander transatlantic recognition. He also voiced Gigio on Sunday Night at the London Palladium in the UK.

In the early 1990s he moved back to Australia, where he continues to act. He appeared as a doctor in Home and Away. In 2023, he self-published a "love-crime-war-drama" novel called Not Just Another Love Story.

== Theatre roles ==
Year	Title	Role	Venue / Company
1949	Varsity Revue: Keep it Clean	Vocalist	Tivoli Theatre, Adelaide
1953	A New Verse Play		University of Adelaide
1953	Sparkling Burgundy '53		University of Adelaide
1954	Romeo and Juliet		University of Adelaide
1954	Traveller Without Baggage		University of Adelaide
1954	The Circle	Arnold Champion-Cheney	University of Adelaide
1954	Sydney 1954 N.U.A.U.S. Drama Festival		University of Sydney
1954	The Philadelphia Story		University of Sydney
1954	A Phoenix Too Frequent		University of Sydney
1954	The Relapse		University of Sydney
1954	The Typewriter		University of Sydney
1954	Ring Around the Moon		University of Sydney
1954	The Third Person		University of Sydney, University of Adelaide
1954	Miss Julie		University of Sydney
1954	Anna Christie		University of Sydney
1954	Crime and Punishment		Studio Theatre, Adelaide
1956	Summer of the Seventeenth Doll		Rialto Theatre, Brisbane
1957	Lower Education		University of Sydney
1957	Macbeth	Malcolm	Independent Theatre, Sydney
1957	The Big Knife		Independent Theatre, Sydney
1957	The Lark	The Promoter	Independent Theatre, Sydney
1950s	My Three Angels		J. C. Williamson's
1960	The Tragedy of King Richard II	Henry Bolingbroke	Independent Theatre, Sydney
1963	The Season at Sarsaparilla	Harry Knott	Theatre Royal Sydney

== Filmography ==
=== Film ===
Year	Title	Role	Notes	Ref.
1957	In the Zone	Scotty	TV film	
1957	Ending It	Waiter	TV film	
1960	Shadow of the Boomerang	Stockman	Feature film	
1961	The Big Client	Geoff Manning	TV film	
1965	Moby Dick – Rehearsed	Starbuck	TV film	
1966	Topo Gigio Comes to Town	Topo Gigio (voice)	TV film	
1967	Toppo Jîjo no botan sensô	Narrator		
1969	Submarine X-1	Sub. Lt. X-3	Feature film	
1968	Thunderbird 6	John Tracy / Carter / Narrator	Feature film	
1969	Doppelgänger (aka Journey to the Far Side of the Sun)	EUROSEC Launch Controller (uncredited)	Feature film	
1978	Superman	Newscaster	Feature film	
1979	Hanover Street	Soldier in Barn	Feature film	
1980	All About a Prima Ballerina	Peter – The Agent		
2009	The Dark Side of War	Journalist	Short film	
2013	Finding Bennelong	Voice	Short film	

=== Television ===
Year	Title	Role	Notes	Ref.
1958	Killer in Close-Up		1 episode	
1964	The Stranger	John Robinson	Miniseries	
1964	Tribunal	Andrew Volstead	1 episode	
1966	Mrs Thursday	PC Matthews	Episode: "Family Reunion"	
1966	Softly, Softly	PC Downer	Episode: "Blind Man's Bluff"	
1967	No Hiding Place	1st Customs Officer	Episode: "A Through and Through with Powder"	
1967	Vendetta	Sergeant Bristow	Episode: "The Desperate Man"	
1968	Merry-Go-Round	Reader	1 episode	
1968–1969	Joe 90	Sam Loover, and 49 supporting characters	30 episodes	
1969	Heritage	Alcinous	1 episode	
1969	The Secret Service	Various characters (voices)	13 episodes	
1970–1971	UFO	Lieutenant Keith Ford	16 episodes	
1976	The New Avengers	Malloy	Episode: "Gnaws"	
1978	Life at Stake	Fred Haise	1 episode	
1979	Minder	Andy	TV series, episode "The Bounty Hunter"	
1981	The Day of the Triffids	Newsreel voice	Mniseries, episode 1	
1993	Home and Away	Male Pensioner	1 episode	
1993	G.P.	Harold King	1 episode	
1996	Water Rats	Mr Scali	2 episodes	
1997	The Adventures of Sam	Voice role	Animated series	
2005–06	The Adventures of Bottle Top Bill and His Best Friend Corky	Various characters	2 episodes	
2018	Trial by Kyle	Narrator	TV series	
2019	The Andersons	Narrator		
	The History of the Chinese			

== Radio ==
Year	Title	Role	Notes
1983	The Last Cargo of the Cathay Queen	Ship owner (top billing)	
