= Len Jones =

British actor

- Born: 1950 or 1951 (age 74–75)
- Occupation: Actor
- Years active: 1964–1975
- Known for: Voicing Joe McClaine in Joe 90

Len Jones (born 1950/1951) is a British former child actor who was active in the 1960s and 70s.

== Career ==
In his youth, Jones appeared in television series such as Z-Cars (1964–1968), Adam Adamant Lives! (1966), Dixon of Dock Green (1966–1975), Softly, Softly (1967), The Magnificent Six and 1/2 (1968) and The Adventures of Black Beauty (1972). His film credits included appearances in Seventy Deadly Pills (1964), Sky West and Crooked (1966), Spring and Port Wine (1970), Straw Dogs (1971), Danny Jones (1972) and Made (1972).

He is notable for his work on the Supermarionation TV series Joe 90 (1968–1969), in which he voiced nine-year-old superspy Joe McClaine.

At the age of 23, Jones quit acting and became a London bus driver. In 2005 he was living in Feltham.

== Selected film and television appearances ==
- Seventy Deadly Pills (1964) as Phil Streaker
- Sky West and Crooked (1966) as Dusty
- The Christmas Tree (1966) as Boy In Bed in Hospital (uncredited)
- The Magnificent Six and 1/2 – episode "When Knights Were Bold" (1968) as Steve
- Spring and Port Wine (1970) as Wilfred Crompton
- Straw Dogs (1971) as Bobby Hedden
- Danny Jones (1972) as Danny Jones
- Made (1972) as Barry
