= GF1 =

GF1 may refer to:

== Space ==
- 1967 GF1, another name for the 3539 Weimar asteroid
- 1981 GF1, another name for the 4243 Nankivell asteroid
- 1999 GF1, another name for the 44574 Lavoratti asteroid
- Gaofen 1, a high resolution Chinese earth observation satellite

== Science and technology ==
- The symbol of the GATA1 (erythroid transcription factor) protein
- Gravis Ultrasound GF1, a sound card
- Panasonic Lumix DMC-GF1, a digital camera

== Other ==
- Gemini Force One, a novel by Gerry Anderson and M. G. Harris
