= The Investigator (TV pilot) =

1973 TV pilot by Gerry Anderson

- Title screenshot
- Genre: Science fiction
- Screenplay by: Sylvia Anderson
- Story by: Shane Rimmer
- Directed by: Gerry Anderson
- Starring: Charles Thake; Peter Borg
- Voices of: Sylvia Anderson; Shane Rimmer; Peter Dyneley
- Theme music composer: Vic Elmes
- Composer: John Cameron (uncredited)
- Country of origin: United Kingdom
- Original language: English

Production
- Producer: Gerry Anderson (uncredited)
- Production locations: Malta; England
- Cinematography: Harry Oakes
- Editors: David Lane; Len Walter
- Running time: 23 minutes
- Production company: Starkits

The Investigator is a 1973 British television pilot devised, produced and directed by Gerry Anderson, creator of Thunderbirds and other Supermarionation TV series of the 1960s. It centres on two American youths, John and Julie, who have been recruited by an extragalactic being called "the Investigator" to aid his self-appointed task of ridding Earth of evil and corruption. Miniaturised and given special knowledge and abilities, they take on Stavros Karanti, an unscrupulous businessman plotting to steal a priceless painting from a Maltese cathedral. Shane Rimmer and Sylvia Anderson voice John and Julie, who are represented by two-foot-tall (0.61 m) marionette puppets, while Charles Thake and Peter Borg appear as Karanti and his minion Christoph.

The pilot marked Gerry Anderson's first use of puppets since The Secret Service (1969). Written by his wife Sylvia from a story by Rimmer, it was filmed on location in Malta between the production of The Protectors and a planned second series of UFO (which would later be made as Space: 1999). Filming was complicated by numerous technical and logistical difficulties and the crew were unable to finish the shoot. The pilot was assembled from the incomplete footage but Anderson, disappointed with the result, abandoned his idea of pitching it to NBC as the basis for a new Supermarionation series. Unaired to date, the pilot has received a negative response from commentators. It was released on DVD in 2012 and 2015.

== Plot ==
The Investigator, an omniscient being from another galaxy, has come to Earth to rid it of evil and corruption. To assist him, he has recruited two young Americans, John and Julie, whom he has miniaturised and given special powers. In a cave on Malta, the Investigator (represented by a flashing green light) gives John and Julie their first assignment: they are to foil crooked entrepreneur Stavros Karanti's plan to steal a priceless Raphael painting from St John's Cathedral in Mdina. To aid their mission, he provides them with an eight-wheel miniature car equipped with powerful surveillance devices. Thanks to his new abilities, John instantly knows how to drive the car.

John and Julie go to Angel's Leap and spy on Karanti as he boards his yacht, the Borgia, and meets his associate Christoph. When the men come ashore and drive to Mdina, John and Julie follow. While touring St John's, to which he has donated a fake painting, Karanti learns of the cathedral's security arrangements. Karanti and Christoph return to the Borgia pursued by John and Julie, who board the yacht via a miniature speedboat provided by the Investigator. The youths accidentally knock over an object, alerting the criminals to their presence, but avoid being discovered thanks to their small size.

Returning to St John's at night with John and Julie again on their tail, Karanti and Christoph knock out the cathedral's security guard and seize the Raphael painting. John tries to stop the criminals by mounting a chandelier and swinging it at them. Karanti fires a gun at John, missing him but causing him to fall to the floor, injured. Karanti and Christoph get away. Leaving Christoph at the harbour, Karanti drives to a nearby airfield, planning to leave Malta in his Cessna 150 plane. John and Julie beat him to the airfield and stow away aboard the Cessna before Karanti takes off. Speaking through a miniature megaphone, John pretends to be Karanti's conscience urging him to surrender. At the same time, Julie uses a remote control to make the plane repeatedly roll and dive, terrifying Karanti. On John's instructions, Karanti radios air traffic control to confess his crimes and lands at the airfield, where he is arrested by police.

With the painting safely returned to the cathedral, John and Julie report back to the Investigator, who congratulates them on a job well done.

== Cast ==
- Charles Thake as Stavros Karanti
- Peter Borg as Christoph
- Sylvia Anderson as Voice of Julie
- Shane Rimmer as Voice of John
- Peter Dyneley as Voice of The Investigator

== Production ==
The Investigator was Gerry Anderson's first puppet production since The Secret Service (1969), the last Supermarionation series to be made by his former company Century 21 Productions. Having gone on to make the live-action series UFO and The Protectors, neither of which were made specifically for children, Anderson wanted to create something new for the younger audience and devised The Investigator as the template for a new Supermarionation programme, intending to pitch it to American network NBC in the hope that it would commission a series. The pilot was planned by Anderson, his wife Sylvia and their long-time business partner Reg Hill. Written by Sylvia from a story by Shane Rimmer, it was funded by private venture capital and produced by shelf company Starkits between the making of The Protectors and the planned second series of UFO (which was then redeveloped as Space: 1999).

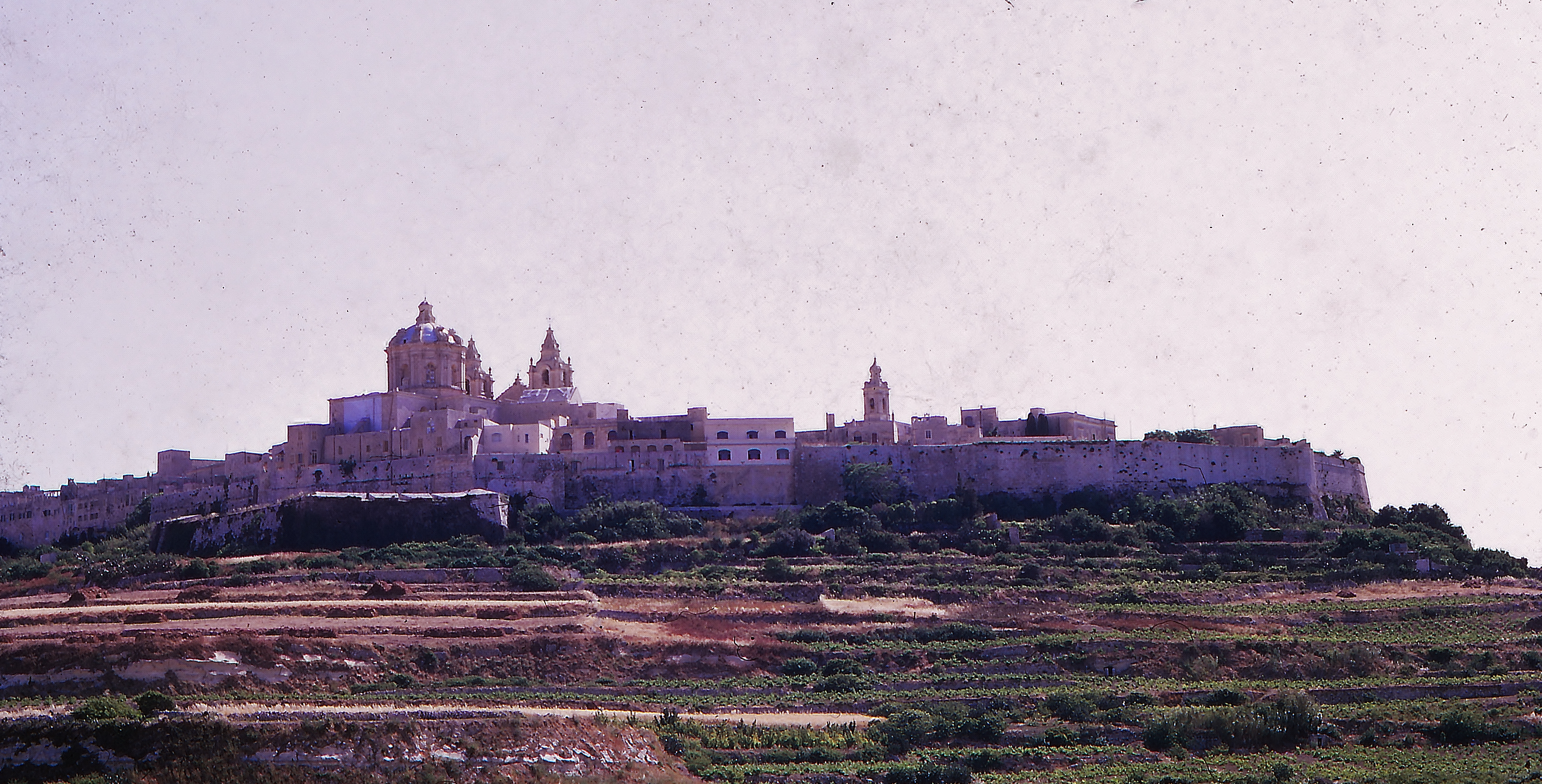
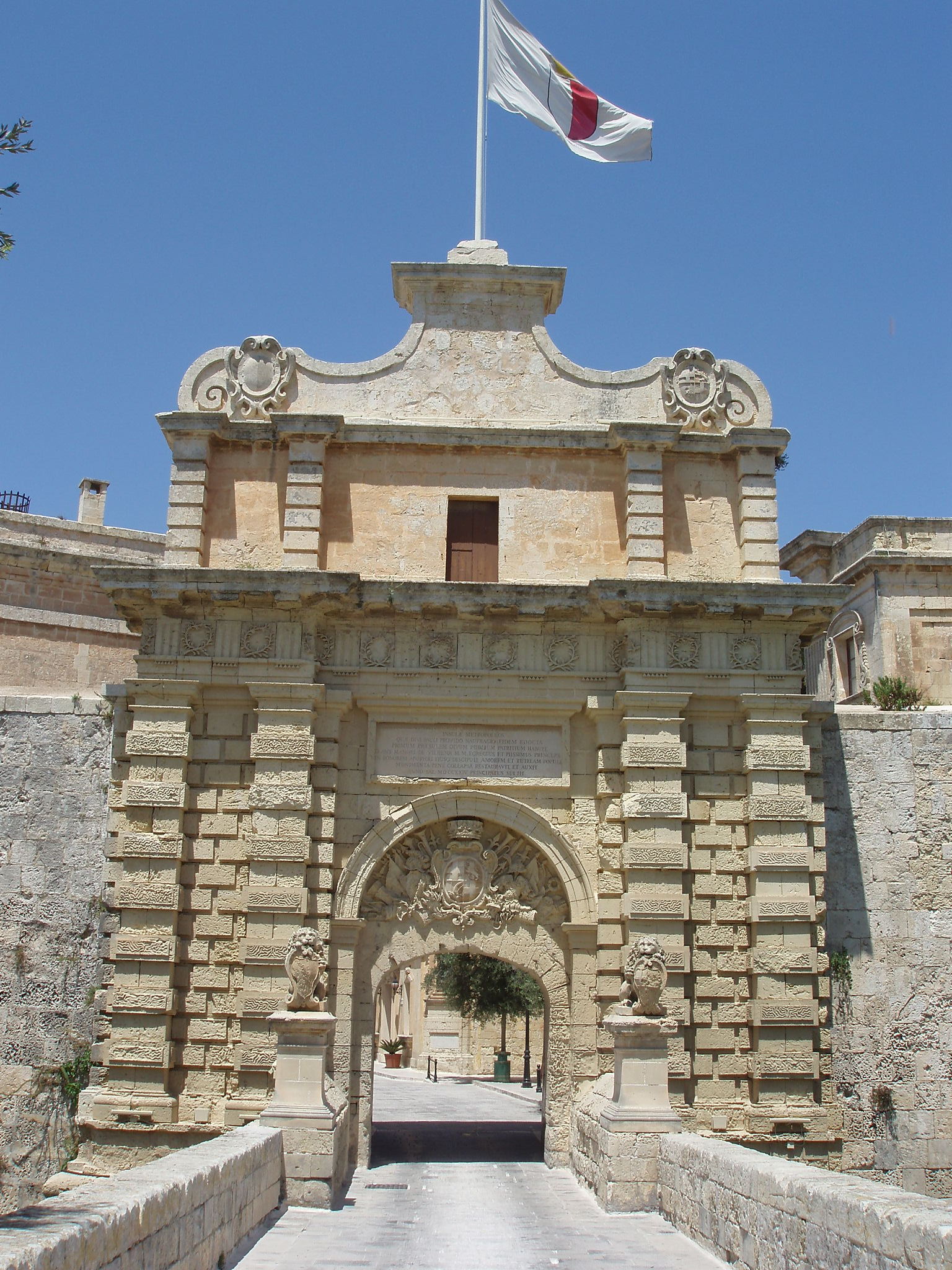
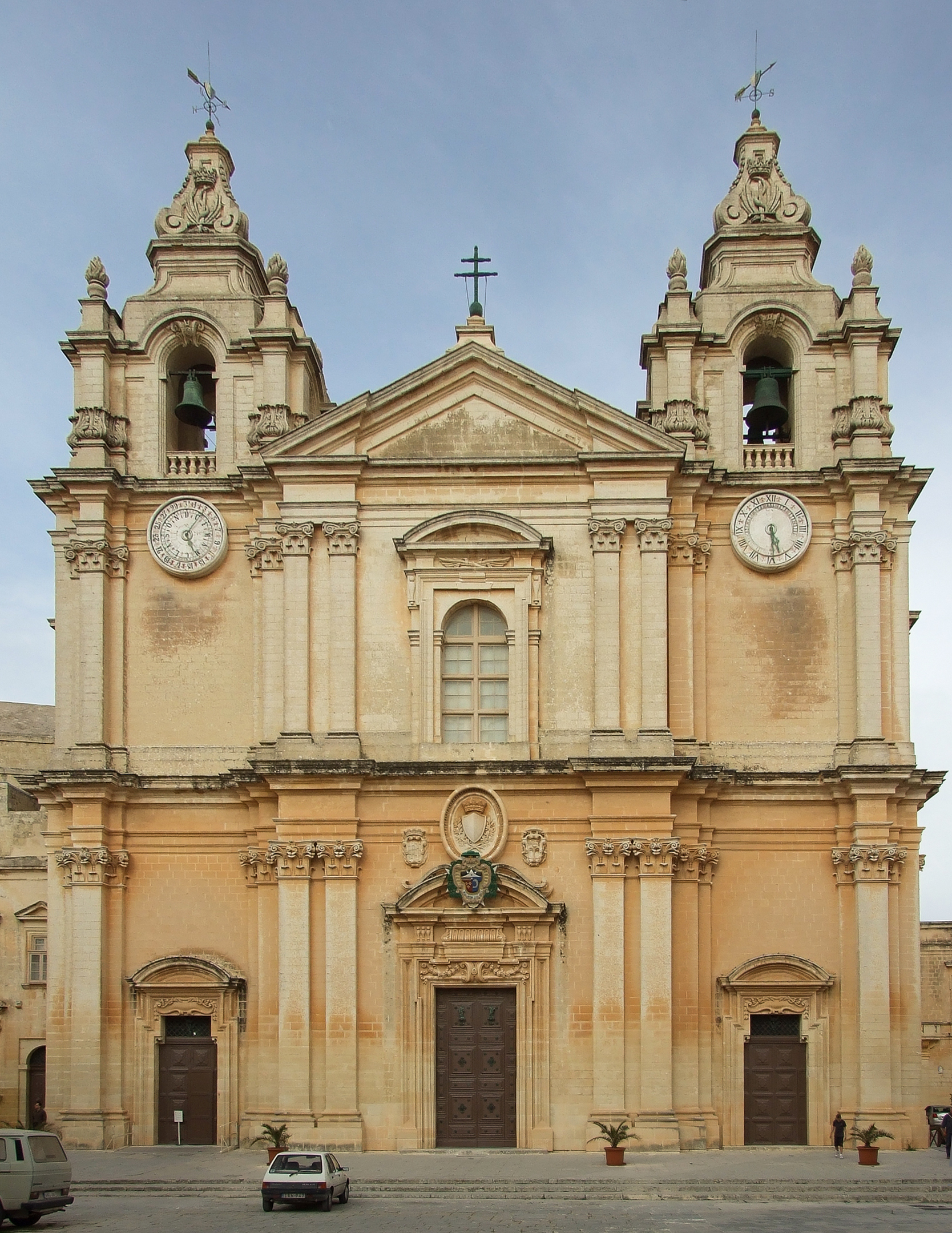
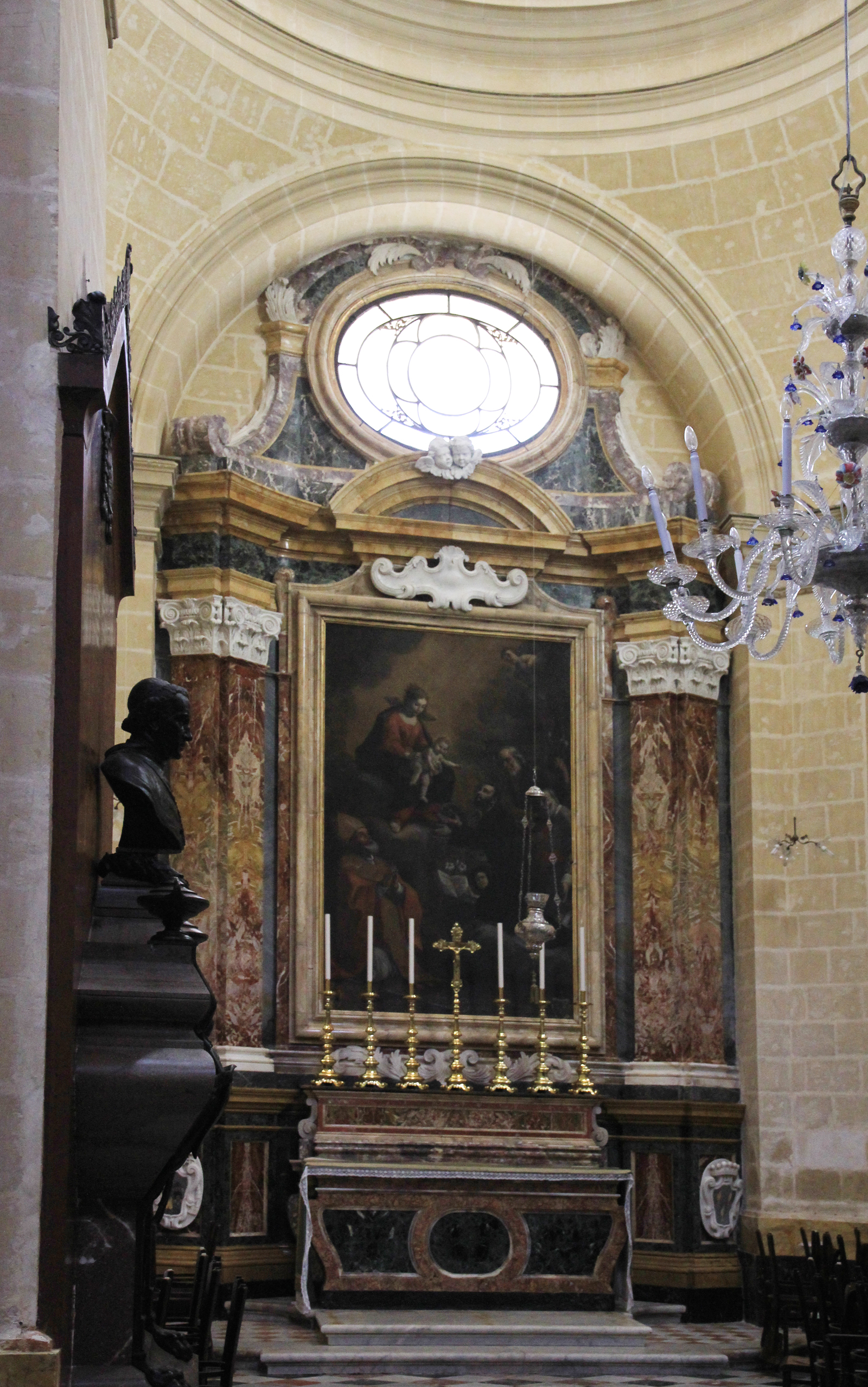
Location filming took place in Mdina (top), including the Main Gate (bottom left) and St Paul's Cathedral (bottom centre and right).

The project saw the return of several crew members from the Supermarionation years, such as co-editor David Lane, as well as the reunion of voice actors Sylvia, Rimmer and Peter Dyneley, all of whom had voiced characters in Thunderbirds. Charles Thake had previously appeared in "Ceremony for the Dead", an episode of The Protectors which had been filmed in Malta. The John and Julie puppets were two feet (0.61 m) tall and made in the naturally-proportioned style that Century 21 had introduced for Captain Scarlet and the Mysterons (1967). Unlike the puppets of 1960s Supermarionation, which had been controlled from overhead bridges, they were operated from the ground with the puppeteers standing on boxes. Julie was modelled on Raquel Welch. Modified versions of the puppets later appeared in Alien Attack, a 1977 TV advertisement produced by Gerry Anderson. The model car and speedboat were designed by Hill and operated by radio control.

The pilot was shot mostly in Malta, entirely on location, in the winter of 1973. The island country had been a filming location for The Protectors and was chosen for its architecture and scenery. Specific filming spots included the Main Gate and St Paul's Cathedral in Mdina as well as Malta International Airport. Announcing Anderson's arrival in January 1973, the Times of Malta reported that the prospective Investigator series was planned to run for 26 episodes.

The Investigator was shot on 16 mm film. Its production was beset by technical and logistical problems. Low light meant that the crew often had to shoot in close-up, which made it hard to capture the scale and detail of the locations. The model car was affected by radio signals from RAF Nimrods, causing it to crash into objects or speed off in the wrong direction. Poor weather also disrupted the proceedings. At one point, heavy rain forced the crew to film outdoor scenes under a plastic cover that started to leak, soaking the set. On another occasion, a storm hit while Gerry Anderson was on Malta and the rest of the unit were on Gozo, leaving the director and his crew cut off from each other and causing the production to lose a day. Another day was lost when the sailing yacht doubling as the Borgia fouled its anchor.

Anderson did not have facilities in Malta to view rushes from the production. Footage was instead flown back to the UK, where it was processed by Hill. Eventually the production's schedule ran out and the crew were forced to return to the UK before they had finished filming. This meant that the aerial footage for the scenes aboard Karanti's plane had to be shot over the English countryside. The pilot was then put together using the material available.

The theme music was composed by Vic Elmes, Sylvia Anderson's then son-in-law. Elmes was originally to have scored the entire pilot, but Gerry Anderson was unimpressed by his efforts and replaced him with John Cameron, the composer for The Protectors. The incidental music was recycled from Cameron's work on that series.

== Reception ==
I went to Malta wearing two hats, director and producer, and because of this I failed miserably because it is difficult to play the two roles ... I came terribly a cropper, because when we took a close-up the puppets' heads were only about eight inches from the lens. Consequently it was damn near impossible to hold the depth of focus in order to bring in the grandeur of the background that we had travelled all that way to film.

— Gerry Anderson on the pilot's difficult production (2002)

The Andersons and Hill were disappointed with the finished pilot and abandoned the idea of pitching it, feeling that its quality was too low to satisfy NBC or any other broadcaster. Gerry Anderson's opinions on The Investigator ranged from a "pretty dull, uninspired piece of filmmaking" to a "disaster". He regretted serving as both director and producer as he felt that his need to limit costs as producer compromised his vision as director. In his 1996 biography, he called the project an "absolute non-starter" and reflected that "everything, but everything went wrong on The Investigator."

Simon Archer and Marcus Hearn compare The Investigator to The Secret Service, which combined puppets and live actors in a similar way. They describe it as an "extrapolation" of the earlier series. Ian Fryer suggests that The Investigator "pushed the notion further" by being filmed entirely on location. He argues that the pilot displays "decent professional standards" and that the "sketchiness" of the premise can be justified by the fact that unlike the first episodes of the Supermarionation productions, where all story elements had been approved prior to filming, The Investigator was made as a "true pilot" whose elements were still subject to approval. He praises the model work, believing the car and speedboat to be well designed despite the low budget, but regards John and Julie as poorly-developed characters, pointing out that they receive a shorter introduction than the car. Suggesting that an Investigator series could have been a "junior version" of Mission: Impossible, noting that 1973 was the "tail end of the post-Bond craze", Fryer acknowledges the pilot's failure, concluding that "the return of Supermarionation died, unheralded, on the rain-swept streets of Malta."

TV Zone magazine comments that the lack of puppet movement "does little to enliven the characters" and calls The Investigator a "poor attempt to recreate the heyday of Century 21". SFX describes it as a "weirdly forlorn thing" and "existentially peculiar even by Anderson's standards." According to Anderson's son Jamie, The Investigator "lacked the science fiction context that made [his] previous shows so successful."

== Other media ==
Toy versions of the car and speedboat were produced by Dinky. However, the toys' launch was cancelled when it became clear that no series would be made. After being redesigned and repackaged to omit all references to The Investigator, the car eventually went on sale in 1975 as the Dinky "Armoured Command Car". The boat, renamed "Coastguard Amphibious Missile Launch", followed in 1977.

For many years The Investigator was unavailable on any home video format, although fan-made copies existed and it was screened at Anderson conventions. In 2012, Fanderson released a DVD of The Investigator exclusively for its members. The print used to make the DVD had been restored by BBC Resources, which also recreated its missing closing titles. The Investigator was later included in 2015's "The Lost Worlds of Gerry Anderson" DVD by Network Distributing.
