= Nebula-75 =

Puppet-animated web series

- Genre: Science fiction
- Written by: Stephen La Rivière; Andrew T. Smith
- Directed by: Stephen La Rivière
- Voices of: Stephen La Rivière; Justin T. Lee; Géraldine Donaldson; Lindsay Lee; Nigel Heath; Andrew T. Smith
- Music by: Barry Gray
- Country of origin: United Kingdom
- Original language: English
- No. of series: 2
- No. of episodes: 12

Production
- Producers: Andrew T. Smith; Stephen La Rivière
- Running time: 15 minutes
- Production company: Century 21 Films

Original release
- Release: 25 April 2020 – 23 December 2021

Nebula-75 is a 2020s Supermarionation web series created by Century 21 Films in the spirit of the early 1960s series by Gerry Anderson's AP Films. The series follows the adventures of the crew of the spaceship Nebula-75, trapped in space "33 million miles from Earth". Commander Ray Neptune is joined by robot Circuit, scientist Doctor Asteroid and the mysterious "space maiden" Athena, who only communicates via telepathy.

== Production ==
The series was created by Stephen La Rivière and Andrew T. Smith and their production team during the COVID-19 pandemic in the United Kingdom – finding themselves unable to continue planned studio production work, the filmmakers created the series in a flat with puppets, props and materials from earlier productions such as Filmed in Supermarionation, Thunderbirds: The Anniversary Episodes and the Endeavour episode "Apollo".

Original 1960s-era music was licensed from the Barry Gray Archive, including a 1963 song "Robot Man" by Mary Jane with Barry Gray and his Spacemakers. The authentic 1960s feel of the production was discussed by Samira Ahmed with La Rivière on BBC Radio 4's Front Row on 19 May. Ahmed later lent her voice to a news reporter character, Juliette Destiny, for the 2020 Christmas episode.

== Release ==
A second series of Nebula-75 commenced its run in 2021 and in December of that year it was announced that the series had been picked up for distribution by Tohokushinsha Film Corporation in Japan. The series' broadcast on Japanese television was preceded by theatrical screenings of Nebula-75's first episode, shown in cinemas across the country alongside Thunderbirds: The Anniversary Episodes, which was made by members of the same production team.

The series was not initially available on YouTube due to a licensing agreement. However, in May 2024, both Series 1 and 2 episodes were made available through Century 21 Films' YouTube channel.

It is currently available on Amazon Prime Video (in the US and the UK) and on Vimeo.

== Episodes ==
=== Series 1 ===
No.	Title	Original release date
1	"Nebula-75"	25 April 2020
Stranded millions of miles from home by forces unknown, Commander Neptune and the crew of the Nebula-75 must come to terms with their new life amongst the stars. Their isolation is interrupted, however, by two alien visitors...
2	"The Storm Before The Calm"	3 May 2020
Commander Neptune wishes to know more about the mysterious Space Maiden who saved his ship. In learning more, he also finds out about the malevolent forces that lurk in the section of space the Nebula-75 now finds itself.
3	"Short Circuit"	11 May 2020
When the Nebula-75's ramshackle robot Circuit suffers from one malfunction too many and the crew encounter an old eccentric in need of assistance, who will save the day?
4	"No One I Think Is In My Tree"	30 May 2020
A strange spatial distortion transports our heroes into an unknown realm. Separated from his crew and trapped in a mysterious void, Commander Neptune must resist the call of a sinister disembodied voice and find his way back to the ship before it is too late…
5	"Heist Society"	16 June 2020
A distress call summons Commander Neptune to the assistance of a pair of aristocrats. Once aboard, however, it becomes apparent that he is dealing less with "high society" than he is "heist society". Hoodwinked and robbed of valuable systems the crew of the Nebula-75 face a race against time to put things right.
6	"Freighter Fright"	31 October 2020
Halloween Special. The Nebula-75 crew pick-up a distress call from an old freighter and set off to investigate. However, when they arrive it appears to have been abandoned for decades, so where did the call come from?
7	"The Grift of the Magi"	24 December 2020
Christmas Special. On Christmas Eve, the Nebula-75 crew tune into a broadcast from Earth by Juliette Destiny (guest voiced by Samira Ahmed). But some unwelcome faces soon threaten their dreams of a white Christmas.

=== Series 2 ===
No.	Title	Original release date
8	"The Incredible Voyage of Nebula-75"	12 May 2021
The crew of the Nebula-75 inadvertently find themselves the stars of the latest motion picture by renowned filmmaker Dave the Director, who is making his last great film before he retires.
9	"Crash Landing"	18 November 2021
When the Nebula-75 crash lands on a mysterious planet Commander Neptune and Doctor Asteroid are lucky to escape with their lives. However, someone has a vested interest in their demise...
10	"For The Ashes Of His Fathers"	16 December 2021
Frustrated by the delays in launching a rescue mission to retrieve the Nebula-75, General Ganymede of the Zodiac Space Centre decides to take matters into his own hands. Little does he know, however, that forces from space conspire to use him against the crew he seeks to save...
11	"Fool's Gold"	21 December 2021
When Commander Neptune goes missing during a mission to locate a valuable, yet highly volatile, fuel source, his crew must face the devious Captain Caswell, scourge of the seven space winds.
12	"... And There Was Light"	23 December 2021
When Doctor Asteroid spots signs of life on a planet that should be totally incapable of supporting it, the crew of the Nebula-75 send Circuit to investigate. But when Circuit is seemingly attacked, they must face hazardous conditions to discover what has become of him...
