= Stephen La Rivière =

British filmmaker

Stephen La Rivière is a British filmmaker, writer and actor. He is co-director of film company Century 21 Films.

La Rivière's directorial work includes the feature-length documentary Filmed in Supermarionation (2014), based on his book of the same name (2009). The film led to the creation of three new Thunderbirds episodes titled Thunderbirds: The Anniversary Episodes, as well as filmed inserts for the ITV drama Endeavour (2019) and a farewell documentary about the former AP Films studios, Century 21, Slough (2019).

In 2020, during the COVID-19 lockdown in the United Kingdom, he co-created and directed Supermarionation-inspired puppet web series Nebula-75, for which he also performed voices.

He edited a 2014 photo book about the life and career of Gerry Anderson. He has also written for The Guardian and SFX magazine.
