= Supermarionation =

Style of television and film production

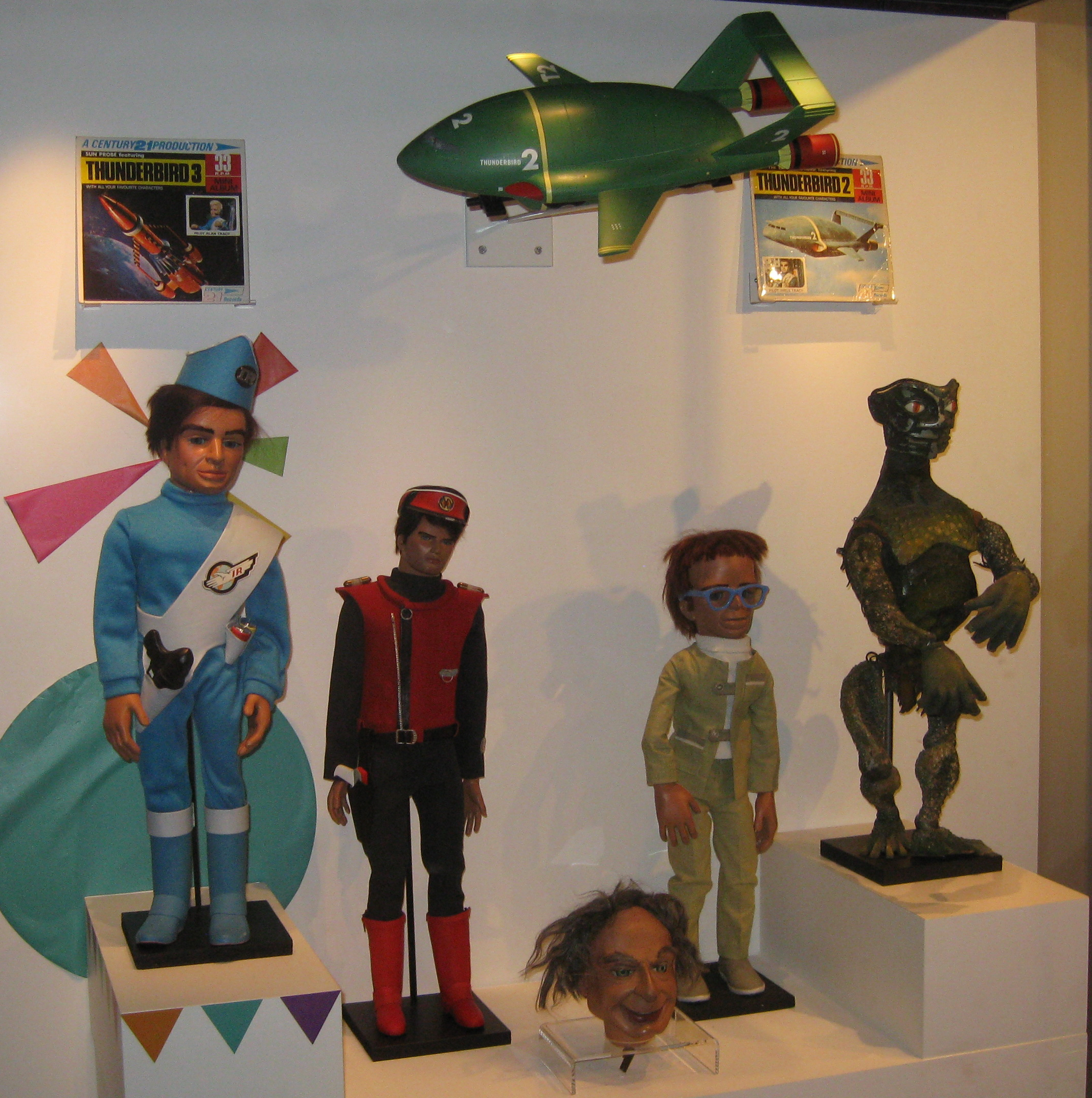
Supermarionation puppet characters from Thunderbirds, Captain Scarlet and the Mysterons and Fireball XL5 on display at the National Media Museum in Bradford, UK

Supermarionation (a portmanteau of the words "super", "marionette" and "animation") is a style of television and film production employed by British company AP Films (later Century 21 Productions) in its puppet TV series and feature films of the 1960s. These productions were created by Gerry and Sylvia Anderson and filmed at APF's studios on the Slough Trading Estate. The characters were played by electronic marionettes with a moveable lower lip, which opened and closed in time with pre-recorded dialogue by means of a solenoid in the puppet's head or chest. The productions were mostly science fiction with the puppetry supervised by Christine Glanville, art direction by either Bob Bell or Keith Wilson, and music composed by Barry Gray. They also made extensive use of scale model special effects, directed by Derek Meddings.

The term "Supermarionation" was first used during the production of Supercar, whose final 13 episodes were the first to be credited as being "filmed in Supermarionation". Some sources consider its precursor, Four Feather Falls, to be the first Supermarionation series because it saw the introduction of the electronic lip-syncing mechanism that featured in all of APF's later puppet productions.

The term was coined by Gerry Anderson, who regarded it as APF's trademark. In later life, he said that he invented the term to increase the "respectability" of puppetry, a medium he had not originally intended to work with. According to Sylvia, the productions were described as "Supermarionation" to distinguish them from traditional puppet theatre. Noting that a major disadvantage of APF's marionettes was their inability to walk convincingly, commentators have argued that the term expressed Gerry's preference for artistic realism and his wish to make the company's puppet techniques more lifelike.

== Definition ==
When we got to making this better class of puppet film, I was looking for a more fitting way to explain how our productions differed from those of our predecessors. I wanted to invent a word that promoted the quality of our work, so we combined the words "super", "marionette" and "animation". It didn't mean anything other than that, and it certainly didn't refer to any specific process. It was our trademark, if you like.

— Gerry Anderson on the origin of the term (2002)

The term was coined in 1960 by Gerry Anderson. Sources describe Supermarionation as a style of puppetry, a production technique or process, or a promotional term. Emma Thom of the National Science and Media Museum defines it as APF's use of electronics to synchronise puppets' lip movements with pre-recorded dialogue. According to Jeff Evans, it "express[es] the elaborate style of puppetry" used in APF's productions. Anderson denied that the term referred to a process, stating that he coined it as a promotional tool to separate APF's output from other children's puppet series like Muffin the Mule and Flower Pot Men. This was motivated by his embarrassment in working with puppets as opposed to live actors, and his wish to dispel the notion that APF's marionettes were "the sort of puppets that were used in pre-school programmes". He also likened Supermarionation to a "trademark". According to Sylvia Anderson, the term was used to "distinguish the pure puppetry of the stage from our more sophisticated filmed-television version". Lou Ceffer of the website Spy Hollywood calls Supermarionation a "marketing term".

A 1960s supplement of the British trade newspaper Television Mail described Supermarionation as a "technical process" whose main features, besides electronic puppet control, were use of 35 mm colour photography, 1/5-scale filming stages, back projection, live-action inserts and live action-style special effects, and video assist to guide the crew. According to Chris Bentley, the term encompasses "all of the sophisticated puppetry techniques" used by APF – the foremost being the automatic mouth movement – "combined with the full range of film production facilities normally employed in live-action filming" (such as front and back projection, location shooting and visual effects). Other commentators have cited the complexity and detail of the puppets, models and sets as aspects of Supermarionation. Marcus Hearn states that the term reflected Gerry Anderson's desire to "promote his company's collective ingenuity as a proprietary process" and "[ally] his productions with Hollywood photographic techniques such as CinemaScope and VistaVision." He adds that it "encompassed the full panoply of APF's expertise – production values in model-making, photography, special effects, editing and orchestral music that had never been so consistently applied to any type of children's programme, let alone those featuring puppets."

== History ==
=== Development and use in Anderson productions ===
We were determined to break away from [children's puppet programmes], so we treated those programmes as if they were something really special and hoped people would see the effort we were putting in and offer us live-action films ... When we did those early things we asked ourselves what we could do to improve them. Christine Glanville, who was so important to us as we went on with the puppets, came up with improvements all the time.

— Sylvia Anderson on the making of APF's early productions (2001)

Gerry Anderson's first experience with puppet filming was in 1956, when Pentagon Films – a group of five filmmakers including Anderson and his friend Arthur Provis – was contracted to make a series of Noddy-themed TV advertisements for Kellogg's breakfast cereal. Around this time, Pentagon also produced a 15-minute puppet film called Here Comes Kandy. These early efforts were noticed by children's author Roberta Leigh, who had written a collection of scripts titled The Adventures of Twizzle and was looking for a film company to turn them into a puppet TV series. By this time, Anderson and Provis had left Pentagon to form their own company, Anderson Provis Films (AP Films or APF). They accepted the commission, disappointed not to be working with live actors but realising that they needed Leigh's investment to stay in business. Before starting production, Anderson and Provis hired three staff: continuity supervisor Sylvia Thamm (former secretary at Pentagon and Anderson's future wife), art director Reg Hill and camera operator John Read. All three would later be made co-directors of the new company and play a significant role in the development of its productions.

The puppets of Twizzle had papier-mâché heads with painted eyes and mouths and were each controlled using a single carpet thread. Speech was indicated by nodding the heads. Somewhat embarrassed to be making a children's puppet series, Anderson and Provis decided to produce Twizzle in the style of a feature film, incorporating dynamic shooting and lighting in the hope that the results would bring them bigger-budget commissions with live actors. To add to this more sophisticated look, the series often used three-dimensional sets instead of traditional flat backgrounds, while puppeteers Christine Glanville and her team operated the marionettes not from the studio floor, but from a bridge above it.

Following the completion of Twizzle, APF was unsuccessful in securing new clients, so accepted another puppet commission from Leigh: Torchy the Battery Boy. This series used puppets with wooden bodies and heads of "plastic wood" (a mixture of cork dust, glue and methylated spirit). The heads incorporated moveable eyeballs and a hinged jaw that was opened and closed with a string. In practice, jaw movement was difficult to control due to the bobbing of the puppets' heads. By now all puppet sets were three-dimensional. They had also become more detailed, being made mostly of cardboard with fibreglass props.

After Torchy, APF severed ties with Leigh and produced its first independent series, Four Feather Falls, using funding from Granada. The puppets now had hollow fibreglass shells for heads and tungsten steel wires instead of strings. Meanwhile, the hinged jaw gave way to an electronic lip-sync mechanism. Designed by Hill and Read, this was powered by a solenoid, mounted in the head and fed electric current by two of the wires. Lip-syncing was a key step in the development of Supermarionation, and Four Feather Falls is regarded by some sources as the first Supermarionation production. The mechanism made it easier for the puppeteers to operate the marionettes in time with their dialogue as it was no longer necessary to learn the characters' lines. According to Anderson, as exaggerated movements were no longer needed, the puppets were finally able to speak "without their heads lolling about a like a broken toy". By now the puppeteers' movements were guided using a basic form of video assist: a TV camera mounted directly behind the film camera, which relayed footage to the various monitors around the studio.

The term "Supermarionation" was coined during the production of Supercar, APF's first series to be made for Lew Grade's distribution company ITC Entertainment. Its final 13 episodes were the first to be credited as being "filmed in Supermarionation".

==== Supercar to Thunderbirds ====
The "Filmed in Supermarionation" logo, variations of which appeared in the title sequences and closing credits of 1960s puppet series made by AP Films

The puppets and puppet sets of Supermarionation were built in 1/3 scale, the former being roughly two feet (61 cm) tall. Each marionette was suspended and controlled with several fine tungsten steel wires that were between 1/5000 and 1/3000 of an inch (0.0051–0.0085 mm) thick, replacing the carpet thread and twine strings that had been used prior to Four Feather Falls. To make the wires non-reflective, initially they were painted black; however, this made them thicker and more noticeable, so manufacturers Ormiston Wire devised a method of chemically darkening them to keep them as thin as possible. During filming, the wires often needed to be further concealed using "antiflare" spray (grease mist) or various colours of paint to blend in with the sets and backgrounds. Balancing the weight was crucial: puppets that were too light would be difficult to control; too heavy and their wires would not bear the load. Inserts of real human hands, arms and legs were used to show complex actions that the puppets could not perform, such as operating machinery. In a 1965 interview, Reg Hill estimated that the Supermarionation productions contained "three or four times" as much cutting as live-action features because the puppets' lack of facial expression made it impossible to sustain the viewer's interest "for more than a few seconds" per shot.

The puppets' distinguishing features were their hollow fibreglass heads and the solenoids that powered the automatic mouth movements. Character dialogue was recorded on two tapes. One of these would be played during filming, both to guide the puppeteers and provide a basis for the soundtrack; the other would be converted into a series of electrical signals. When activated by the signals, the solenoid in the head caused the puppet's lower lip to open and close with each syllable.

The heads of regular characters were entirely fibreglass; proto-heads were sculpted in clay or Plasticine and then encased in rubber (or silicone rubber) to create moulds, to which fibreglass resin was applied to create the finished shells. Guest characters were played by puppets called "revamps", whose faces were Plasticine sculpted on featureless fibreglass heads. This allowed the revamps to be re-modelled from one episode to the next and play a wider range of characters. Many regulars were modelled on contemporary Hollywood actors. The puppets' eyes were moved by radio control.

The placement of the solenoid dictated the puppets' body proportions. Head-mounted solenoids made the heads oversized compared to the rest of the body; the latter could not be scaled up to match as this would have made the puppets too bulky to operate effectively, and would have required all the set elements to be enlarged. According to commentator David Garland, the disproportion was influenced partly by "aesthetic considerations ... the theory being that the head carried the puppet's personality". It resulted in many puppets developing caricatured appearances, though Anderson stated that this was not intentional.

==== Captain Scarlet onwards ====
Between Thunderbirds and Captain Scarlet and the Mysterons, the development of miniaturised electronic components prompted APF – now called Century 21 Productions – to create a new type of puppet. The option to downsize the components in the head was rejected in favour of moving the entire lip-sync mechanism to the chest, where it was connected to the mouth by a cable that ran through the neck. This made it possible to shrink the heads and make the puppets of Captain Scarlet and later series in natural proportions. Around this time, Century 21 also tried to make the puppets' faces more lifelike by crafting them in a new, flexible material, but the results proved unsatisfactory and the idea was abandoned. As the reduced head size made it harder to sculpt faces in Plasticine, guest characters were now played by a group of permanent, all-fibreglass puppets that were made to the same standards of workmanship as the regular characters. Likened to a "repertory company", these puppets could be superficially altered from one appearance to the next – for example, by adding or removing facial hair.

In a 2002 interview, Anderson said that during the production of Captain Scarlet he was hoping to move into live-action television and that he endorsed the new puppets as a compromise for his inability to use live actors. In 2006, he recalled that Century 21 had been "typecast" for its puppetry: "[S]o, knowing it was the only thing I could get finance for, I desperately wanted to make the thing look as close to live action as possible. And I think it was that that drove me on to bring in all the improvements and techniques." Thom believes that the re-design reflected Anderson's desire for greater "realism and spectacle".

Not all of Anderson's colleagues welcomed the change. Puppet sculptor and operator John Blundall pejoratively referred to the new puppets as "little humans" that lacked the personality of their precursors, also stating that the increased emphasis on realism hampered the puppeteers' creativeness. Fellow sculptor Terry Curtis believed that the re-design took away the puppets' "charm". According to director Desmond Saunders, APF was trying "anything to get [the puppets] to look like ordinary human beings. But they are not ordinary human beings! ... I often wonder it if would have been better to make them more like puppets, not less like puppets." A drawback of the smaller heads was that they upset the weight distribution; this made the puppets harder to control, to a point where they would often have to be fixed to G-clamps to be kept steady. In addition, problems achieving realistic depth of field made it considerably harder to film close-up shots.

==== Problem of puppet movement ====
A major limitation of the marionettes was their inability to walk convincingly. This was due to their low weight and the fact that the legs of each puppet were controlled by only two strings, which made complex articulation impossible. According to Sylvia Anderson, the re-design exacerbated the puppets' core deficiencies: "The more realistic our puppets became, the more problems we had with them ... It was just possible to get away with the awkward moments in Thunderbirds because the proportions of the characters were still caricature. It was later when we had developed a more realistic approach ... that the still imperfect walk was [all] the more obvious." To limit the need for leg movement, many scenes featuring walks were filmed from the waist up, with motion implied by a puppeteer holding the legs out of shot and bobbing the marionette up and down while pushing it forward. Other scenes showed puppets standing, sitting or driving vehicles. Tex Tucker, the hero of Four Feather Falls, avoids walking by riding a horse called Rocky, while the characters of Fireball XL5, Stingray and Thunderbirds achieve the same through use of personal hovercraft. Supercar and Stingray's focus on their eponymous car and submarine, as well as Stingray's depiction of Commander Shore as a paralytic reliant on a futuristic "hoverchair", are examples of other devices used to overcome the puppets' lack of mobility.

Because we had characters who couldn't stand properly without their knees sagging, and characters who had no expression, it was very difficult to play a love scene and impossible to have a fight. And so it seemed the way to go was anything that was fast-moving and had a lot of excitement, so it seemed that science fiction was the best option.

— Gerry Anderson on the need to make puppet series as science fiction (2006)

In a 1977 interview, Gerry Anderson said that the steps taken to make the puppets more lifelike were an attempt to "make the [puppet] medium respectable". On the preparations for Supercar, APF's first science-fiction production, he remembered "[thinking] that if we set the story in the future, there would be moving walkways and the puppets would be riding around in the car for much of the time, so it would be much easier to make them convincing." According to interviewer Kevin O'Neill, this use of future settings for greater realism "almost accidentally" ensured that all of APF's subsequent series would be science fiction. In 2006, Anderson stated that the transition to this genre "wasn't a conscious move at all", but rather a natural progression given the basic deficiencies of the puppets. Sylvia said that the reasons were budgetary, due to the fact that APF could not yet afford to work with live actors: "... we were picking subjects that we could easily do in miniature scale."

David Garland calls character movement Anderson's "bête noire" and states that the puppets' limited mobility resulted in "vehicle-heavy science fiction" becoming his "preferred genre". He considers the use of marionettes – the kind of puppet "perhaps most unsuited" to an action format – to be "one of the most striking paradoxes" of the Anderson productions. Carolyn Percy of the Wales Arts Review comments that the inclusion of "futuristic vehicles" like Supercar allowed APF to devise "more exciting and imaginative scenarios" and "work around the limitations of the puppets ... to give their 'acting' the integrity to match the material."

The final Supermarionation series, The Secret Service, used footage of live actors to such an extent that the result according to Stephen La Rivière was "half-way between live action and Supermarionation". Its protagonist, Stanley Unwin, was modelled on the comedian of the same name, who both voiced the puppet character and served as its human body double in long shots and other scenes where the puppet was impractical to use. According to Anderson, this was another way of avoiding the problem of lack of mobility: "I came up with the idea of getting Stanley Unwin to do all the walking shots, and driving shots in this Model Ford T [the character] had. If, for example, you had a sequence where Stanley Unwin would arrive at a building in his Model T, he would ... get out, walk down the path, and as soon as he opened the door, you'd cut to the reverse angle and that would be the puppet of Stanley Unwin ... I used Stanley Unwin, married to his own puppet, to enable him to do all the things that the puppet couldn't do."

==== Special effects ====
Special effects were created with miniature models and sets in a range of scales. A wide variety of materials were used in their construction – for example, rock faces were made from painted blocks of polystyrene, while miniature vehicles incorporated recycled household objects and parts from toy model kits. The lighting used for effects shooting was five times as strong as that normally used on a live-action production. Effects were typically shot at high speed (72 to 120 frames per second) with the footage slowed down in post-production to give a sense of greater weight or steadiness, thus making the sequences look more realistic. High-speed filming was essential for shots on water to make the small ripples inside the filming tank look like ocean waves. As sets were built to scale, it was often hard to maintain a realistic sense of depth.

Underwater sequences were filmed not in water, but on dry sets with a thin aquarium between the set and the camera to distort the lighting. Bubble jets and small fish were added to the aquarium to create forced perspective. Beginning with Stingray, shots of aircraft in flight were filmed using a technique called the "rolling sky", which was devised by effects director Derek Meddings to allow filming of dynamic shots in confined space. It involved painting the sky background on a canvas, which was then wrapped around a pair of electrically driven rollers, and creating an impression of movement by running the canvas around the rollers in a continuous loop as opposed to moving the miniature aircraft itself. Thunderbirds saw the introduction of the "rolling road", an adaptation of the technique whereby foreground, middleground and background elements of road sequences were created as separate rolls of looped canvas and spun at varying speeds.

In the pursuit of realism, newly built models and sets were deliberately "dirtied down" with paint, oil, pencil lead and other substances to give them a used or weathered look. Jetex propellant pellets were fitted to the undersides of miniature ground vehicles to emit jets of gas resembling dust trails. Over time, the effects used for puppet gunfights became more elaborate: whereas gunshot effects in Four Feather Falls were created by simply painting marks on the film negative (which showed up as white flashes on the finished print), for later series the puppets' miniature prop guns were fitted with small charges that were fired using a car battery.

==== List of Anderson Supermarionation productions ====
Title	Year(s)	Format	Notes
Four Feather Falls	1960	TV series	APF's first TV series to use marionettes with fibreglass heads and electronic lip-sync mechanisms. Regarded as the first Supermarionation series by some sources, although the term was not used until the production of Supercar.
Supercar	1961–1962	TV series	First production to feature rocket effects, back projection effects and underwater scenes filmed "dry" through water tanks. The 13‑episode second series was the first to be credited as being "filmed in Supermarionation" and the first for which puppets were copied to allow episodes to be filmed in pairs by separate crews. It also marked the introduction of a dedicated special effects unit, led by Derek Meddings.
Fireball XL5	1962–1963	TV series	First production to feature front projection effects and puppet heads with blinkable eyes.
Stingray	1964–1965	TV series	APF's first colour series. First production on which puppets' facial expressions could be varied: main characters could now be fitted with "smiler" and "frowner" heads. For greater realism, poseable hands and glass eyes (bearing miniature prints of real human eyes) were also introduced.
Thunderbirds	1965–1966	TV series	
Thunderbirds Are Go	1966	Feature film	Nearly all puppet heads were by now made of fibreglass (previously, guest character faces were sculpted in Plasticine). "Under‑controlled" puppets, lacking wires and operated from the studio floor, were introduced for scenes showing characters sitting – for example, fighter pilots in aircraft cockpits.
Captain Scarlet and the Mysterons	1967–1968	TV series	The lip-sync mechanism was moved to the chest, allowing the puppets to be redesigned in natural proportions. Guest characters were now played by a "repertory company" of permanent fibreglass puppets that could be superficially altered for each role (e.g. by adding or removing facial hair). Eyes were now plastic.
Thunderbird 6	1968	Feature film	The puppets mostly kept their pre-Captain Scarlet body proportions, although heads and hands were made slightly smaller. First production to feature extensive location shooting.
Joe 90	1968–1969	TV series	
The Secret Service	1969	TV series	Featured extensive footage of live actors. Last series to be "filmed in Supermarionation".
Captain Scarlet S.I.G.	2001	Documentary	DVD documentary on the making of Captain Scarlet. Linking sequences feature the puppet characters of Captains Scarlet and Blue. Produced by Gerry Anderson and credited as being "filmed in Supermarionation".

The Andersons' puppet work also included The Investigator (1973), a pilot for an unmade Supermarionation series. This featured both marionettes and live actors but did not include the term "Supermarionation" in the credits.

== Critical response ==
Noting that Gerry Anderson would have preferred to make live-action productions instead of puppet series, Percy argues that his style of filming was developed to "make the puppet film as 'respectable' as possible". She also comments that APF's filming techniques "would not only result in a level of quality and sophistication not seen before in a family show, but also give birth to some of the most iconic series in the history of British children's television."

Garland describes the underlying theme of Anderson's work as a "self-reflexive obsession with an aesthetic of realism (or more accurately a surface realism often associated with naturalism) borne of an unfulfilled desire to make live-action films for adults", further commenting that Anderson's typecasting as a puppet TV creator "led him on a lifelong quest to perfect a simulation of reality". He notes that Anderson's involvement with puppets began at a time when Western puppet theatre "had become increasingly marginalised to a niche, to an association with children's entertainment", and that APF's productions used an "aesthetic of incremental realism" to appeal to children and adults alike (a target audience that the Andersons referred to as "kidult"). Garland suggests that this drive towards increased realism echoed "19th-century marionette theatre's own attempts to distinguish itself from other forms of puppetry (especially glove puppets), which also involved a tethering to the newly-emergent realist aesthetic across the arts".

== Successor techniques ==
In 1983, Gerry Anderson returned to puppetry with his independent science-fiction TV series Terrahawks. The characters of this series were made as three-foot-tall (0.91 m) rubber hand puppets, operated from the studio floor in a process called "Supermacromation". This was similar to the techniques employed by American puppeteer Jim Henson.

In 2004, Anderson created a Captain Scarlet remake titled New Captain Scarlet, which was produced using computer-generated imagery (CGI) and motion-capture techniques. Motion capture was used heavily for action sequences as it provided more convincing character movement. As a nod to Supermarionation, the series was credited as being "created in Hypermarionation". According to Anderson, Hypermarionation was not simply animation, but a "photo-real" production method combining CGI, high-definition picture and surround sound. Garland suggests that through Hypermarionation, Anderson sought to achieve a "hyperreal simulation of his live-action film utopia".

In 2014, a Kickstarter campaign was launched to fund a remake of the anime series Firestorm, to be produced using a technique called "Ultramarionation".

== Revival ==
In the 2010s, Stephen La Rivière and his production company Century 21 Films began a revival of Supermarionation. Their productions are listed below.

Title	Year	Format	Notes
Filmed in Supermarionation	2014	Documentary	Includes newly filmed Supermarionation puppet sequences featuring characters from Thunderbirds.
Thunderbirds: The Anniversary Episodes	2015	Mini-series	Screen adaptations of three Thunderbirds audio plays originally released in the 1960s. Made in celebration of the series' 50th anniversary and filmed using 1960s Supermarionation production methods.
Nebula-75	2020	Web series	Puppet web series made during the COVID-19 lockdown in the UK. Filmed in the spirit of APF's early-1960s productions and credited as being "filmed in Supermarionation and Superisolation".

Century 21 Films also worked on "Apollo", a 2019 episode of Endeavour that is set partly in a TV studio which is making a puppet series called Moon Rangers. The episode features story-within-a-story marionette sequences that were written and filmed as a tribute to Supermarionation.

Supermarionation characters also appear briefly in the BBC Children in Need Puppet Aid music video, albeit with no speaking or singing role.

== Non-Anderson productions using similar techniques ==
The puppet series Space Patrol, created by Roberta Leigh and Arthur Provis and filmed by Leigh's company National Interest Picture Productions, used marionettes similar to those of APF's early series (including the use of automatic mouth movement). However, they were made in natural body proportions.

The Japanese series Aerial City 008 (1969) and X-Bomber (1980) also featured Supermarionation-style puppets, with the latter of the two referring to its filming style as 'Supermariorama' in reference to Supermarionation. In South Africa, similar techniques were used to make Interster (1982–86). The American puppet series Super Adventure Team (1998) was created in imitation of Supermarionation but with more adult themes and suggestive situations.

Team America: World Police, a 2004 puppet film by South Park creators Trey Parker and Matt Stone, was inspired by Thunderbirds and has been described as an imitation or spoof of Supermarionation productions. Stone and Parker dubbed their filming process "Supercrappymation" (or "Supercrappynation") as the wires were deliberately left visible.

A Stargate SG-1 episode, "200" (2006), features a self-parody in which the characters are played by Supermarionation-style puppets.

== See also ==
- Augsburger Puppenkiste

== References and further reading ==
=== Works cited ===
==== Books ====
- Bentley, Chris (2008) [2001]. The Complete Gerry Anderson: The Authorised Episode Guide (4th ed.). London, UK: Reynolds & Hearn. ISBN 978-1-905287-74-1.
- Garland, David (2009). "Pulling the Strings: Gerry Anderson's Walk from 'Supermarionation' to 'Hypermarionation'". In Geraghty, Lincoln (ed.). Channeling the Future: Essays on Science Fiction and Fantasy Television. Lanham, Maryland: Scarecrow Press. pp. 61–75. ISBN 978-0-8108-6922-6.
- Hearn, Marcus (2015). "Rocket Science". Thunderbirds: The Vault. London, UK: Virgin Books. pp. 20–42. ISBN 978-0-753-55635-1.
- La Rivière, Stephen (2014) [2009]. Filmed in Supermarionation (2nd ed.). London, UK: Network Distributing. ISBN 978-0-992-9766-0-6.
  - First published as: La Rivière, Stephen (2009). Filmed in Supermarionation: A History of the Future. Neshannock, Pennsylvania: Hermes Press. ISBN 978-1-932563-23-8.
- Meddings, Derek (1993). 21st Century Visions. Surrey, UK: Paper Tiger Books. ISBN 978-1-85028-243-3.
- Peel, John (1993). "Supermarionation". Thunderbirds, Stingray, Captain Scarlet: The Authorised Programme Guide. London, UK: Virgin Books. pp. 16–21. ISBN 978-0-86369-728-9.
- Rogers, Dave; Marriott, John; Drake, Chris; Bassett, Graeme (1993). Supermarionation Classics: Stingray, Thunderbirds and Captain Scarlet and the Mysterons. London, UK: Boxtree. ISBN 978-1-85283-900-0.
- Sangster, Jim; Condon, Paul (2005). Collins Telly Guide. London, UK: HarperCollins. ISBN 978-0-00-719099-7.
- Sellers, Robert (2006). "Puppet Master". Cult TV: The Golden Age of ITC. London, UK: Plexus Publishing. pp. 77–115. ISBN 978-0-85965-388-6.

==== Periodicals ====
- Hirsch, David; Hutchison, David (September 1978). Zimmerman, Howard (ed.). "The Magical Techniques of Movie & TV SFX – Part XI: Supermarionation". Starlog. Vol. 3, no. 16. New York City: O'Quinn Studios. pp. 58–66. ISSN 0191-4626.
- Holliss, Richard (Winter–Spring 1999). Duquette, Patrick (ed.). "The Worlds of Gerry Anderson – Part One: From The Adventures of Twizzle to Thunderbirds". Animato!. No. 40. Monson, Massachusetts: Duquette, Patrick. pp. 44–52. ISSN 1042-539X. OCLC 19081197.
- Just Imagine: The Journal of Film and Television Special Effects. London, UK: O'Neill, Kevin. 2 (1). Winter 1977–1978.

=== Further reading ===
- Anderson, Sylvia (1991). "The Characters in Action". Yes, M'Lady. London, UK: Smith Gryphon. pp. 28–42. ISBN 978-1-856850-11-7.
- Simpson, Paul, ed. (2002). "Supermarionation". The Rough Guide to Cult TV: The Good, The Bad and The Strangely Compelling. Rough Guides. London, UK: Rough Guides. pp. 239–245. ISBN 978-1-84353-009-1.
