= Terrahawks =

1980s British science fiction television series

- Genre: Children's science fiction
- Created by: Gerry Anderson; Christopher Burr
- Written by: Gerry Anderson; Tony Barwick; Donald James; Trevor Lansdown
- Directed by: Tony Bell; Tony Lenny; Alan Pattillo; Desmond Saunders
- Voices of: Denise Bryer; Windsor Davies; Jeremy Hitchen; Anne Ridler; Ben Stevens
- Music by: Richard Harvey; Gerry Anderson; Christopher Burr
- Country of origin: United Kingdom
- Original language: English
- No. of series: 3
- No. of episodes: 39 (list of episodes)

Production
- Producers: Gerry Anderson; Christopher Burr
- Cinematography: Harry Oakes; Paddy Seale
- Editors: Alan Killick; Tony Lenny; Desmond Saunders; Tony Hunt
- Running time: 25 minutes
- Production company: Anderson Burr Pictures in association with LWT
- Budget: £5 million (episodes 1–26); £1.4 million (episodes 27–39)

Original release
- Network: ITV
- Release: 8 October 1983 – 26 July 1986

Terrahawks is a 1980s British science fiction television series created by Gerry Anderson and Christopher Burr for London Weekend Television. The series was Anderson's first in over a decade to use puppets for its characters, and also his last. Anderson's previous puppet-centric TV series included Thunderbirds and Captain Scarlet and the Mysterons.

Set in the year 2020, the series follows the adventures of the Terrahawks, a taskforce responsible for protecting Earth from invasion by a group of extraterrestrial androids led by Zelda. Like Anderson's previous puppet series, futuristic vehicles and technology featured prominently in each episode.

== Premise ==
The series is set in the year 2020, after an alien force has destroyed NASA's Mars base and Earth is under threat. A small organisation, The Terrahawks, is set up to defend the planet. From Hawknest, their secret base in South America, they develop sophisticated weapons to prepare for the battles to come.

Terrahawks was less strait-laced than any of Anderson's previous series, featuring a wry, tongue-in-cheek humour as well as dramatic jeopardy.

== Characters and vehicles ==
=== The Terrahawks ===
Terrahawks (technically, the Earth Defence Squadron) is an elite task force that protects Earth from alien invasion.

- Doctor "Tiger" Ninestein (voiced by Jeremy Hitchen): Terrahawk's pilot and the team's leader, so named as he is the ninth clone created by Dr. Gerhard Stein. Somewhat bloodthirsty, his first reaction to alien contact is often to blast it out of the sky. Ninestein has a love-hate relationship with the Zeroids, particularly Sergeant Major Zero, and tends to push around Hawkeye. If he is killed, he can be replaced within 24 hours by another of the nine clones; his nickname of "Tiger" comes from the myth of cats similarly having "nine lives".
- Captain Mary Falconer (voiced by Denise Bryer): Battlehawk's pilot. She acts as Ninestein's second-in-command, weighing his offensive tendencies with her own regard for the value of life, whether in regards to one of Zelda's henchmen, or to the Zeroids.
- Captain Kate Kestrel (voiced by Anne Ridler; singing voice provided by Moya Griffiths): Real name Katherine Westley, Kestrel is an internationally famous pop singer and the pilot of the Hawkwing fighter aircraft. Her colleagues at the record company are unaware that she works for Terrahawks. Following Anne Ridler's death in 2011, Beth Chalmers voices Kestrel in the series' audio productions.
- Lieutenant Hawkeye (voiced by Jeremy Hitchen): Real name Hedley Henderson, Hawkeye is Hawkwing's gunner. Following a track-and-field accident, his eyes were replaced with micro-computers that enhance his targeting abilities. He is fourth in the Terrahawks chain of command.
- Lieutenant Hiro (voiced by Jeremy Hitchen): The commander of Spacehawk, Hiro keeps a large collection of flowers to which he gives names and reads poetry. He is fifth in Terrahawks' chain of command.
- Zeroids: Spherical robots that perform ground operations and serve as the firepower for the Spacehawk. There are two leaders among the Zeroids who exhibit human-like capacity for thought and emotion, much to the mechanophobic Ninestein's annoyance, who believes they should be unthinking, unfeeling machines that blindly follow orders; Sergeant Major Zero (voiced by Windsor Davies), commands the Zeroids stationed on Earth, while Space Sergeant 101 (voiced by Ben Stevens) directs the Zeroids stationed aboard Spacehawk; 101 and Zero often have arguments over command of Spacehawk. Other Zeroids are given distinct personality traits of their own, such as the Zeroid Dix-Huit, whose name is French for his number, eighteen, and who speaks French and has a handlebar moustache, 55, who bobs up and down in rhyme, 21, who has a stutter, and 66, who has a very thick Scottish accent.
- Colonel Johnson (voiced by Jeremy Hitchen): The head of WASA (World Aeronautics and Space Administration). Though he is ostensibly Terrahawks' co-director, in reality, Ninestein constantly overrides his authority.

==== Terrahawks vehicles ====
- Terrahawk – A flying command centre that can can detach from the main body of the Battlehawk. It is Dr. Ninestein's personal ship.
- Battlehawk – A heavy-duty carrier aircraft which transports the Zeroids, the Battletank, and other auxiliary equipment.
- Hawkwing – A fighter aircraft with a separate over-wing, which can be released to act as a flying impact bomb.
- Treehawk – A single-stage-to-orbit spaceship that transports personnel to the Spacehawk.
- Spacehawk – An orbital battle station with a giant laser that emerges from the base.
- Overlander – A three-segment land vehicle used for transporting goods.
- Battletank – A tank manned by a pair of Megazoids, usually used for major combat operations.
- Spacetank – A tank designed for operations in a vacuum.
- Hudson – Ninestein's Rolls-Royce of indeterminate model, equipped with artificial intelligence and the ability to change its colour.
- Hawklet – A small two seater space craft that is stationed in Spacehawk's hangar bay.
- MEV – A space craft stationed aboard Spacehawk. It is outfitted with tread tracks for traversing terrain, and a grappling arm fitted with a cannon.
- Groundhawk – A bomb disposal and demolition vehicle.

=== Aliens ===
Robots ("androids") from the planet Guk rebelled when their creators and masters deteriorated into a state of apathy. Zelda and company are modelled after the oldest and wisest citizens of their planet, explaining their grey hair and wrinkled skin. They need to consume only small amounts of silicate minerals a month to sustain their functions.

- Zelda (voiced by Denise Bryer): The main villain of the series, Zelda is the wicked and scheming would-be conqueror of Earth. She has power over matter, mainly used to teleport her servants to and from Earth and to manipulate the size of any of her ships or aliens. She was created as a bodyguard for Prince Zegar of Guk, but her inherently programmed ambition led to a revolt by herself and her fellow androids.
- Cy-star (voiced primarily by Anne Ridler; Beth Chalmers in the audio series): Zelda's "daughter" is not very bright, but is endlessly bubbly and optimistic. Frequently, she gets so excited her hair slides around her head.
- Yung-Star (voiced by Ben Stevens): Zelda's "son," Yung-Star is lazy, greedy, cowardly, and only slightly more intelligent than his "sister" – he mistakes the term "nincompoop" for a compliment. However, despite or because of receiving the brunt of Zelda's abuse, he sometimes shows initiative and is far more curious about his surroundings.
- It-Star A "baby" android mothered by Cy-Star near the end of the series. It-Star is a hermaphrodite with two personalities: an innocent young girl (voiced by Denise Bryer) and a scheming, German-accented male (voiced by Jeremy Hitchen).
- Cubes are the aliens' answer to the Zeroids. They can combine into large constructs such as guns and force field cubicles. Their different sides are marked differently, indicating their different functions, such as one serving as a gun. Cy-Star keeps one, Pluto, as a pet.

==== Zelda's monsters ====
Zelda possesses a collection of monstrous servants, Outcasts from various worlds or civilisations, who she keeps in cryogenic storage until needed.

- Sram is a reptilian beast capable of shattering mountains and destroying Hawkwing's shots before they can get close enough to hit him. His blood gives off toxic fumes.
- The Sporilla is a large gorilla-like creature with white fur and horns. Initially, Zelda controls with a signalling device. After the device is destroyed, however, the Terrahawks find that the Sporilla has no desire to fight them.
- MOID: Short for "Master Of Infinite Disguise", MOID is a skeleton-like alien with almost non-existent facial features and the ability to assume the physical appearance of anyone. The Terrahawks seem to find him pitiable, and he seems to regret living a life of servitude to Zelda. Despite working for her, he is also unwilling to kill.
- Yuri is a bear-like creature the aliens find hideous and frightening. He is able to mentally control metal.
- Lord Tempo: A master of time, Tempo can travel back and forth in time at will, and alter its flow locally.
- Tamura: Tamura is a samurai-esque alien with a powerful space cruiser, the Ishimo. He intervenes in the dispute between Zelda and the Terrahawks with the aim of resolving the dispute.
- The Krell is a hairy creature with an eyestalk that can fire a laser beam powerful enough to shoot down objects in orbit.
- Cyclops is a black and red cyclops-like creature capable of absorbing metal.
- Captain Goat is a space buccaneer who captains a pirate radio ship.
- Cold Finger is an alien who is an expert at weaponising water and ice.

== Production ==
Prior to Terrahawks and throughout the entirety of the 1960s, Anderson's series were noted for their use of his Supermarionation technique, which made use of electronically augmented marionettes (the final series to use this technique was the live action/Supermarionation hybrid The Secret Service in 1969; Anderson switched to live action production beginning with 1970's UFO). In contrast, producers of Terrahawks made use of latex Muppet-style hand puppets to animate the characters, in a process Anderson dubbed "Supermacromation". This was partly dictated by the relatively low budget (latex hand puppets being much cheaper to produce than the sculpted wooden marionettes of previous series), but the absence of strings allowed for much smoother movement, and could be used to more easily produce the illusion of the puppets walking. The necessarily static puppets of previous series had been a source of frustration to Anderson during his Supermarionation days.

Split into three series, Terrahawks' 39 episodes were filmed between January 1983 and August 1984. The first 13 episodes were filmed on a budget of £3 million at Bray Studios with a crew of 65.

Tony Barwick, the series' most prolific scriptwriter, constantly used tongue-in-cheek aliases whenever he wrote a different episode, calling himself, for instance, "Anne Teakstein," and "Felix Catstein." (He was not alone in this; Donald James wrote the episodes "From Here To Infinity" and "The Sporilla" under the names "Katz Stein" and "Leo Pardstein" respectively.) The only episodes of the series not credited to pseudonyms ending in "-stein" are "The Midas Touch," scripted by Trevor Lansdowne and Tony Barwick, the latter billed under his real name for the only time on the series, and the two-part opener "Expect The Unexpected," written by Gerry Anderson.

A fourth series would have developed the characters of Kate's producer Stewart Dapples and Kate Kestrel further. This was explained in a documentary on the special features disc of the series, in the Gerry Anderson book Supermarionation and the Terrahawks DVDs. Two of the scripts were called "101 Seed" (a parody of the title "Number One Seed"), written by Anderson himself (as "Gerry Anderstein"), and "Attempted MOIDer" by Tony Barwick (alias in this case D.I. Skeistein).

=== Opening and closing titles ===
The opening and closing sequences were created by Kevin Jon Davies using hand-drawn cel animation to imitate computer graphics. The opening title sequence begins with a video game playing on a screen when Doctor "Tiger" Ninestein appears and says: "Terrahawks! Stay on this channel! This is an emergency!". The end credits, the Zeroid and Cube robots would often "play" noughts and crosses with each other, resulting in a different winner each week (the Cubes usually had to cheat and steal a Zeroid's position to win). The exception to this was the episode "A Christmas Miracle", which featured the song "I Believe in Christmas" as sung by Kate Kestrel played over a still of a Zeroid.

The original opening title sequence was used for both the United States and the UK versions of the series, but a different version of the end credits was produced for the US variant, featuring a Zeroid bouncing up and down next to one of Zelda's Cubes as a "Kate Kestrel" song plays. At the conclusion of the credits the Zeroid jumps off of the screen and crashes back down onto the Cube.

When the series was purchased for airing in Japan, the title and ending credits were augmented by an all-new anime-style sequence, the first highlighting the Terrahawks craft and the Zeroids, and the ending credits showcasing a lonesome spacesuited female remembering her life on Earth as Spacehawk flies over her. The songs used in these sequences are "Galactica Thrilling" (ギャラクティカ・スリリング, Gyarakutika Suriringu) and "Taisetsu na One Word" (大切な言葉（ワン・ワード）, Taisetsu na Wan Wādo; "One Important Word"), respectively, by The Lillies Naomi and Mayumi Tsubame.

=== Music ===
Without the lavish budgets of his earlier television series, it was apparent to Gerry Anderson from a very early stage of production that it would not be possible to record full orchestral scores for Terrahawks. However, the development of synthesised music had advanced considerably since the early days of the experimental 'electromusic' composed and recorded by Barry Gray for Supercar and Fireball XL5, and by 1983 it was possible to create electronic music that could at least approach the scale and majesty of a full orchestra, but at a fraction of the cost.

Richard Harvey was introduced to Anderson by a mutual friend, music producer Tony Prior, who has previously suggested Derek Wadsworth as composer of the music for Space: 1999 Year Two. A graduate of the Royal College of Music with a background in ancient and classical music, Harvey had worked extensively with film composer Maurice Jarre in the late 1970s. This experience made him the ideal choice to compose the music for Terrahawks, combining his knowledge of the structure of classical orchestral music with the latest synthesised music reproduction techniques. Anderson and his business partner Christoper Burr had regular meetings with Harvey to discuss the style of music that they wanted for Terrahawks, particularly the main theme which was envisaged as a combination of the 'best bits' of the themes to Star Wars, E.T. and Dallas.

In 2002, Fanderson records released a soundtrack compiling 75 minutes worth of music, the album included 3 of Harvey's Demo Themes for the show, 6 full episode scores and 3 surviving Kate Kestrel songs, "S.O.S", "It's So Easy" and the latter half of "Living in the 21st Century" which was used as the End Titles music in the U.S. syndication run. The remaining songs and first half of "Living in the 21st Century" are currently missing, presumed destroyed.

Terrahawks

Soundtrack album by Richard Harvey
- Released: 2002
- Genre: Television soundtrack
- Label: Fanderson
- Producer: Andrew Frampton

All tracks are written by Richard Harvey.

Track list
No.	Title	Notes	Length
1.	"Terrahawks Main Theme"		1:09
2.	"Invaders from Mars"	From "Expect The Unexpected Part 1"	5:59
3.	"First Encounter"	From "Expect The Unexpected Part 1"	5:39
4.	"Terrahawks Demo Theme 1"		1:29
5.	"War and Peace"	From "Expect The Unexpected Part 2"	6:27
6.	"Guks Bearing Gifts"	From "Expect The Unexpected Part 2"	7:10
7.	"S.O.S."	Performed by Kate Kestrel	3:12
8.	"Star Roars"	From "Thunder-Roar"	4:36
9.	"Thunder and Frightening"	From "Thunder-Roar"	4:13
10.	"Terrahawks Demo Theme 2"		1:01
11.	"Special Delivery"	From "Close Call"	4:07
12.	"Cuckoo in the Nest"	From "Close Call"	6:04
13.	"It's So Easy"	Performed by Kate Kestrel	4:09
14.	"Tethered Goats"	From "To Catch A Tiger"	2:53
15.	"The Chamber of Death"	From "To Catch A Tiger"	5:01
16.	"Terrahawks Demo Theme 3"		1:36
17.	"Attack of the Space Bear!"	From "Operation S.A.S."	3:45
18.	"Roll of Honour"	From "Operation S.A.S."	5:14
19.	"Living in the 21st Century (US End Titles)"	Performed by Kate Kestrel	1:05
20.	"Terrahawks End Titles"		1:07

== Spin offs ==
=== Comic strip ===
A comic strip adaptation was drawn by Jim Baikie and Steve Kyte for Look-in magazine.

=== Video games ===
The 1982 shoot 'em up Attack of the Timelord! for the Odyssey 2 console was rebranded as Terrahawks for its UK release. The game was published by Philips and released along side the television series in October 1983. It was one of the first TV shows with a video game tie-in.

In 1984, a Terrahawks 3D flight simulator was released by CRL for the ZX Spectrum computer.

In 1983, Bandai produced a handheld electronic game based on the show, titled Terrahawks - The Battlehawk.

=== Big Finish audio dramas ===
It was announced on 19 April 2014 that Terrahawks would be returning as a run of full cast audio dramas featuring original cast members. The new audio series were produced by Anderson Entertainment in association with Big Finish Productions. The first new series was released in April 2015, and consists of eight episodes. Ann Ridler who played Kate Kestrel and Cy-Star was replaced by Beth Chalmers, as Ridler had since died, and Windsor Davies who played Sergeant Major Zero was replaced by Jeremy Hitchen, as Davies had retired from acting.

A second series was released by Big Finish Productions in April 2016, and a third in July 2017.

==== Audio-only characters ====
The Big Finish series features several new characters:

- Lois Price (voiced by Beth Chalmers) is a NASA operative who is sent to Hawknest to investigate the necessity of the continued funding of the Terrahawks project. She becomes involved in a plot by her commanding officer to eliminate the Terrahawks and later goes behind her superiors' backs to give Ninestein command of the X-99 fleet.
- Zeroid 35 (voiced by Beth Chalmers) is an inexperienced and overenthusiastic Zeroid with a crush on Sergeant Major Zero. Originally posted to Spacehawk, she is transferred to Hawknest after her bravery during the Watchdog affair.
- Justin Thyme (voiced by Robbie Stevens) is an American presenter on the TV21 channel.
- Crusher (voiced by Robbie Stevens) is a bouncer at Dick Branston's club and Starsons Studios.
- Dick Branston (voiced by Jeremy Hitchen) is a morally bankrupt billionaire with an eye for the ladies and any questionable money-making scheme. After a plot to destroy his own nightclub fails, Branston founds Global Rescue, an organisation dedicated to saving anyone in distress – providing they can pay.
- Kent Domuch (voiced by Jeremy Hitchen) is the President of the Official Zelda Appreciation Society. Zelda has made repeated attempts to kill Domuch, but is unsuccessful.
- Honor Spot (voiced by Beth Chalmers) is a World Comms reporter.
- Dr. Chemi Rouge (voiced by Denise Bryer) is a French NASA scientist and former lover of Tiger Ninestein. She is in command of Lunarville 16 during the Watchdog affair and later transfers to Lunarville 8 to supervise the Ato-max project.

=== Web series ===
On 10 December 2014, an animated spin-off web series was announced titled Zeroids Vs Cubes. It is produced by IDO Design & Animation and Anderson Entertainment and it came to YouTube on 19 June 2015. Both Jeremy Hitchen and Robbie Stevens reprised their roles as the Sergeant Major Zero and Space Sergeant 101. However, only one episode was released:

No.	Title	Directed by	Written by	Original release date	Prod. code
1	"Party"	Dave Low	Dave Low	19 June 2015	01
Sergeant Major Zero and Space Sergeant 101 decide to have a party themed around the 80s.

=== TV reboot ===
On 12 August 2019, Anderson Entertainment announced that a revival of Terrahawks was in development and titled Kate Kestrel and the Terrahawks. They revealed that it is to be co-produce with Tiny Giant and "is being executively produced by Jamie Anderson (Firestorm) and Stu Gamble (Mansour, Nexo Knights). Showrunner is Mark Hoffmeier (Spider-Man, Nexo Knights, Marvel Super Heroes – Guardians of the Galaxy: The Thanos Threat) who is producing with Mike Penketh (Bob's Burgers, Gravity Falls, Wander Over Yonder and Tron) and Vicky Kjaer Jensen (Ninjago)".
