= Filmed in Supermarionation =

- Film poster
- Directed by: Stephen La Rivière
- Written by: Andrew T. Smith; Stephen La Rivière
- Produced by: Stephen La Rivière
- Starring: Gerry Anderson; Sylvia Anderson; David Graham
- Cinematography: Dave Hicks
- Edited by: Stephen La Rivière; Andrew T. Smith
- Music by: Barry Gray
- Animation by: Justin T. Lee
- Production company: Pod 4 Films
- Distributed by: Network Distributing
- Release dates: 30 September 2014 (BFI); 11 October 2014
- Running time: 114 minutes
- Country: United Kingdom
- Language: English

Filmed in Supermarionation is a 2014 British documentary film about the making of the Supermarionation puppet productions of Gerry and Sylvia Anderson. Produced and directed by Stephen La Rivière, and based on his book of the same name, it was released theatrically in the UK on 11 October 2014, having premiered at the British Film Institute on 30 September 2014. The film was favourably received by critics and was later released on DVD and Blu-ray.

== Synopsis ==
Filmed in Supermarionation tells the story of the development of Supermarionation, a term coined to describe the form of marionette puppetry employed by the teams at AP Films (APF; later Century 21 Productions) under the management of Gerry and Sylvia Anderson. The documentary is hosted by Lady Penelope and Parker, puppet stars of Thunderbirds, who seek to uncover the story behind their creation.

== Production ==
The documentary includes puppet and special effects sequences that were designed to match the look and feel of the 1960s APF productions. Dialogue was recorded with members of the original Thunderbirds voice cast, and puppets and sets were recreated to replicate the Supermarionation style as much as possible. The wiring for Penelope and Parker was provided by Ormiston Wire Company, APF's wire supplier in the 1960s.

While the effects sequences were shot on 35 mm film like the original productions, the puppet scenes were filmed digitally. This workflow allowed for electronic wire removal and set extensions, as well as manipulating the image during post-production to better imitate 1960s film photography.

Although Century 21 promotional stills photographer Doug Luke was interviewed for the documentary, he does not appear in the final cut, nor in the deleted scenes.

== Reception ==
On release, Filmed in Supermarionation was generally well received by critics across a wide range of publications. Peter Bradshaw of The Guardian gave the film four stars, writing that "There is something very romantic about this success story of British entrepreneurial creativity." Rich Trenholm of CNET was similarly positive, stating, "the documentary's vibrant storytelling captures the vitality, innocence and sense of joy of the series themselves". Empire Online rated the film four out of five, commenting that "aficionados will relish this mix of clips, gossip and nostalgia".

The Sussex Express gave five out of five, calling the film a "fitting tribute". Total Film's Neil Smith considered it "lovingly assembled", while Uncut magazine described it as "lively and engaging [...] all very good-natured and rather jolly. Fans [...] will delight in seeing some old faces dusted down for linking segments." On the other hand, Time Out called it "overlong and overexcited".

Oxford Mail's reviewer commented that it "might have been fun to have included contributions from some celebrity fans, or those diehards who keep the Supermarionation myth alive at conventions". He added that "anyone with fond memories of Gerry Anderson's pioneering programmes will forgive the odd moment of self-indulgence and naff humour, as this picture is pretty much critic-proof."

Martin Townsend, in his New Year's editorial for the Sunday Express, enthused: "The likes of Apple and Microsoft may be very impressive companies, but if I wanted to inspire children to be creative entrepreneurs I'd show them the Supermarionation film."
