= Nick Brodie =

British rower

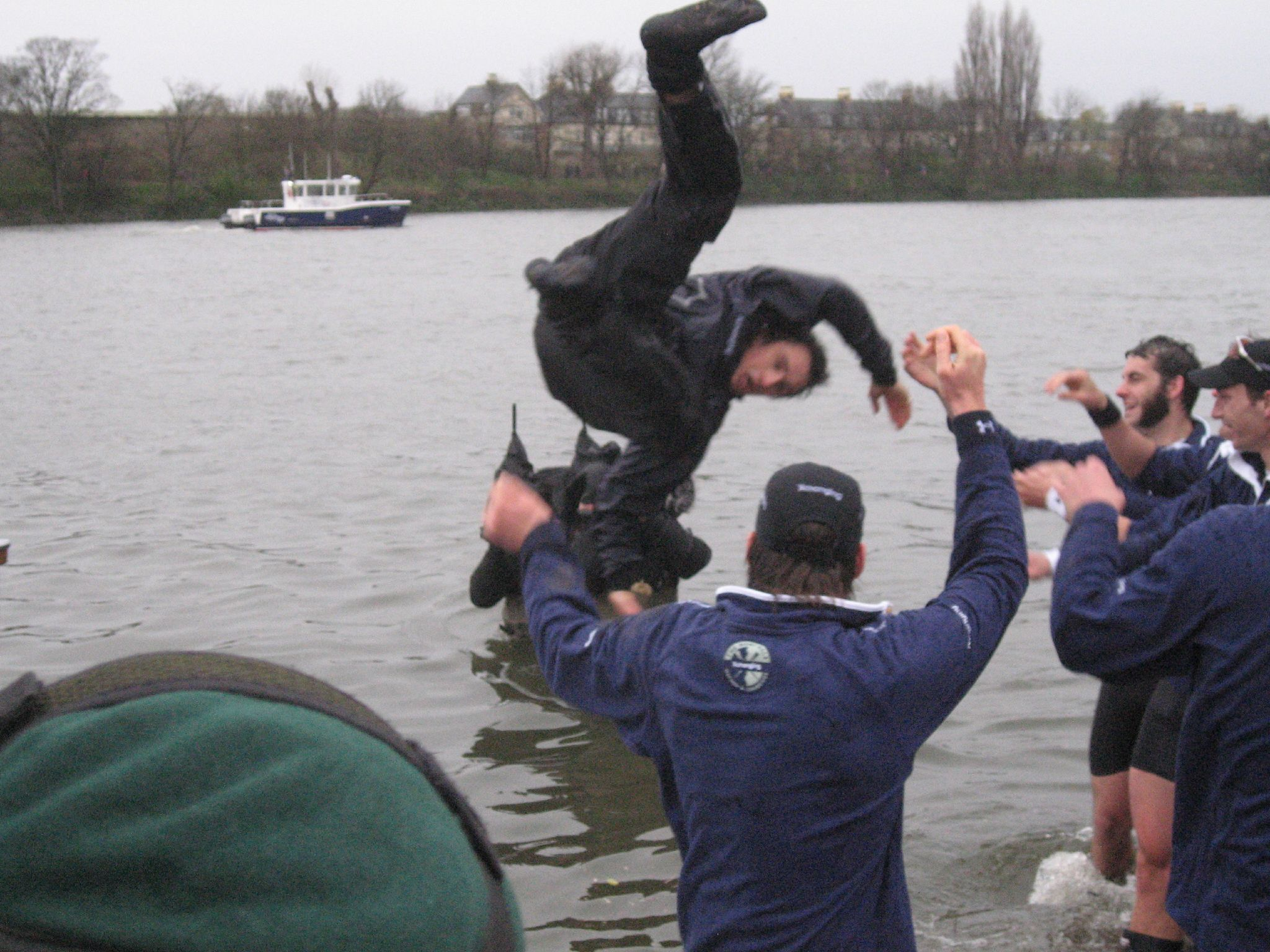
- Brodie being thrown into the Thames after the 2008 Boat Race

Personal information
- Nationality: British
- Born: 6 August 1986 (age 39)
- Weight: 53 kg (117 lb)

Sport
- Country: Great Britain
- Sport: Rowing
- College team: St Catherine's College
- Club: Oxford University Boat Club

Nicholas Duncan Brodie (born 6 August 1986) is a former British cox.

== Profile ==
Whilst in education at Abingdon School he gained colours for the rowing team and was captain of the Abingdon School Boat Club. He won the Princess Elizabeth Challenge Cup in 2002 and became a World Junior Champion in 2003, along with fellow Abingdonian Jamie Anderson when the eight won the gold medal in Athens. After leaving Abingdon in 2004 he attended St Catherine's College at Oxford and joined the St Catherine's College Boat Club.

== Rowing ==
Brodie became president of the Oxford University boat club and in 2007 was selected as Cox for the Oxford dark blue boat at the world renowned Boat Race but finished on the losing side. One year later in 2008 he was selected again and this time finished on the winning side during difficult conditions. Brodie was thrown into the river during the celebrations of the Oxford team. In addition to this he coxed the Great Britain eight to gold at the 2003 Junior World Championships, won the Open Eights in the 2003 Junior Worlds and was a silver medalist with the coxed four at the 2004 World Junior Championships.

== See also ==
- List of Old Abingdonians
