= M. G. Harris =

British-Mexican writer (born 1966)

- Born: August 1966 (age 59–60); Mexico City
- Occupation: Children's author
- Writing career
- Genre: Children's
- Notable works: The Joshua Files; Gemini Force One
- Website: www.mgharris.net

Maria Guadalupe Harris (born August 1966) is the author of the successful children's book series, The Joshua Files. She also worked with the estate of deceased author Gerry Anderson to bring his planned book series Gemini Force One into reality.

== Early life ==
M. G. Harris was born in Mexico City but moved to Manchester very early in her childhood. Before becoming a writer, she worked as a scientist and ran an Internet business. She now lives in Oxford.

== Work ==
=== The Joshua Files ===
Harris was inspired to begin The Joshua Files series when she visited the Mayan ruins of Yucatán. She started to write Invisible City whilst recovering from a skiing accident which resulted in a broken leg. Invisible City (2008) was then followed by Ice Shock (2009) and Zero Moment (2010). Dark Parallel, the fourth in the series, was released in 2011, with the fifth and final book in the series, Apocalypse Moon having been released in April 2012.

==== The Descendant ====
Although not part of the main The Joshua Files range, The Descendant is set within the same fictional continuity as the series. Aimed at adult readers it was written by Harris prior to The Joshua Files, but wasn't released until 2012.

=== Blake's 7 ===
After submitting her treatment to publisher Big Finish, Harris was selected to write a novella for the Blake's 7 collection, Anthology. Based on the television series of the same name, her story Cold Revolution is set during the show's first season.

=== Gemini Force One ===
After Gerry Anderson's death in 2012, Jamie Anderson of the Anderson estate approached M.G. Harris and asked her to continue Gerry's work, which she accepted. The first book in the series, Black Horizon was published in April 2015, with the second, Ghost Mine released in September 2015, and a third book White Storm in 2016.
