= National Interest Picture Productions =

National Interest Picture Productions was a British film production company set up in 1925 by film director Albert E. Hopkins and cinematographer Reginald Wyer. Based in Wardour Street in London's Soho district, it was originally called Publicity Pictures and at first concentrated on producing animated advertising films, short entertainment films, and music features.

The company developed a technique for producing color motion pictures, known as "Spectracolor". Their 1936 film adaptation of Gounod's opera Faust, which was filmed in spectracolor, was one of the earliest colour motion pictures made in Britain. However, according to Richard Fawkes, writing in Opera on Film, "not even that distinction could save it from being dire. Faust has gone down as being the worst operatic film ever made." Two other spectracolor films were released that year, The Midshipman and Railroad Rhythm.

During World War II, the company began making training films for the British Armed forces. After the war, Hopkins and Wyer changed the name to National Interest Picture Productions and continued to make training and information films for the armed forces and pharmaceutical companies until at least 1965. Reg Hill (later known for his work with Gerry Anderson on several successful puppet and live-action TV series in the 1960s) joined the company after the war and worked there for twelve years as a model-maker and animator. In 1978, the company went into voluntary liquidation and was dissolved.
