= Jamie Anderson (producer) =

English producer, director and writer

- Born: 1 March 1985 (age 41); Reading, Berkshire, England
- Education: Oxford Brookes University; Keble College, Oxford
- Occupations: Producer; director; writer
- Years active: 2015–present
- Organization: Anderson Entertainment
- Known for: Terrahawks; Doctor Who
- Father: Gerry Anderson
- Website: Official website

Jamie Anderson (born 1 March 1985) is an English producer, director and writer best known for his work on the Doctor Who and Terrahawks audio plays for Big Finish Productions, and for his work continuing the legacy of his late father Gerry Anderson.

== Education ==
Jamie was educated at Abingdon School where he rowed for the Abingdon School Boat Club first four. He became a World Junior Champion in 2003 along with fellow Abingdonian Nick Brodie when the eight won the gold medal in Athens. In 2003 he was awarded the Diana, Princess of Wales Memorial Award for services to the community. After leaving Abingdon in 2004, he attended Oxford Brookes University for one year before gaining a place at Keble College, Oxford, where he studied physiological sciences.

== Career ==
Anderson began writing for Big Finish Productions in 2015, contributing to the anthology release You Are the Doctor (and Other Stories). Subsequent to its release in December 2015 he began directing a selection of the company's main range of Doctor Who audio plays. His directorial duties were extended to design work in 2016 when he was involved with the visualisation of a stained-glass Dalek with artist Chris Thompson, for a Colin Baker story Order of the Daleks written by Mike Tucker. In addition, he played a role in the Big Finish releases based on two of his father's creations, Terrahawks and Captain Scarlet and the Mysterons.

Outside of Big Finish Productions, Anderson also crowdfunded via Kickstarter the publication of a series of novels based on ideas created by his father, called Gemini Force One.

== Works ==
=== As director ===
- Terrahawks: Volume 1 (April 2015)
- Doctor Who: The Waters of Amsterdam (January 2016)
- Doctor Who: The Peterloo Massacre (March 2016)
- Terrahawks: Volume 2 (April 2016)
- Doctor Who: And You Will Obey Me (April 2016)
- Doctor Who: Vampire of the Mind (May 2016)
- Doctor Who: The Two Masters (June 2016)
- Doctor Who: Order of the Daleks (November 2016)
- Doctor Who: Absolute Power (December 2016)
- Doctor Who: Cold Fusion (December 2016)
- Doctor Who: Quicksilver (January 2017)
- Terrahawks: Volume 3 (July 2017)
- Captain Scarlet and the Mysterons: Spectrum File 1 (September 2017)
- Captain Scarlet and the Mysterons: Spectrum File 2 (September 2017)
- Captain Scarlet and the Mysterons: Spectrum File 3 (September 2017)
- Thunderbirds: Terror from the Stars (2021)
- Stingray: Operation Ice Cap (2021)

=== As writer ===
- Terrahawks: Volume 1 (April 2015)
- Doctor Who: You Are the Doctor and Other Stories (December 2015)
- Terrahawks: Volume 2 (April 2016)
- Doctor Who: Absolute Power (December 2016)
- Terrahawks: Volume 3 (July 2017)

=== As producer ===
- Terrahawks: Volume 1 (April 2015)
- Terrahawks: Volume 2 (April 2016)
- Doctor Who: Cold Fusion (December 2016)
- Terrahawks: Volume 3 (July 2017)
- Captain Scarlet and the Mysterons: Spectrum File 1 (September 2017)
- Captain Scarlet and the Mysterons: Spectrum File 2 (September 2017)
- Captain Scarlet and the Mysterons: Spectrum File 3 (September 2017)
- Firestorm (October 2018)
- Doctor Who: The Comic Strip Adaptations – Volume One (March 2019)

=== As script editor ===
- The Prisoner: Series 1 (April 2016)
- Terrahawks: Volume 2
- The Prisoner: Series 2
- Terrahawks: Volume 3
- Captain Scarlet and the Mysterons: Spectrum File 1 (September 2017)
- Captain Scarlet and the Mysterons: Spectrum File 2 (September 2017)
- Captain Scarlet and the Mysterons: Spectrum File 3 (September 2017)

=== As executive producer ===
- Kate Kestrel and the Terrahawks (TBC)

== See also ==
- List of Old Abingdonians
