= Fanderson =

Appreciation society

- Formation: 20 August 1981
- Type: Not-for-profit
- Purpose: Official appreciation society for the works of Gerry and Sylvia Anderson
- Location: United Kingdom
- Products: Members-only magazine and merchandise; events and services
- Chairman: Nick Williams (since 2007)
- Key people: Gerry Anderson (honorary president)
- Website: www.fanderson.org.uk

Fanderson is the official appreciation society for the works of British film and television producers Gerry and Sylvia Anderson. Based in the United Kingdom, but with an international membership, it is a not-for-profit organisation run by a small committee of volunteers.

The club is endorsed by ITV Studios Global Entertainment, ITC Entertainment Group, The Indestructible Production Company, Anderson Entertainment and the family of Sylvia Anderson.

== Activities ==
The club was formed on 20 August 1981 at a meeting convened by ITC and Gerry Anderson. Previously, ITC had supported the various clubs and societies that followed Anderson's work; in 1981, it requested that these groups merge and, in exchange, promised to give its full backing (except financial support) to the new organisation.

In the early 1990s, the club had approximately 1,600 members. By 1996, it had about 2,000. Anderson was the club's honorary president until his death in 2012.

Paid members receive a subscription to the club magazine, FAB (which is published three times a year – usually in March, July and November), as well as access to exclusive merchandise such as books, DVDs and soundtrack CDs. The club has also held conventions featuring guest appearances by actors and crew from the Anderson productions.

In March 2014, the club severed ties with production company Anderson Entertainment (run by Anderson's widow, Mary, and their son, Jamie), stating, among other claims, that it was pursuing a "commercial agenda that is at odds with Fanderson". Anderson Entertainment called the allegations "demonstrably false".
