= Gemini Force One =

Series of science fiction books by Gerry Anderson

- Series logo
- Black Horizon; Ghost Mine; White Storm
- Author: M. G. Harris
- Country: United Kingdom
- Language: English
- Genre: Science fiction
- Publisher: Orion Children's Books
- Published: starting February 2015
- Media type: Print (Paperback)
- No. of books: 3

Gemini Force One is a series of science fiction books developed by television producer and writer Gerry Anderson before his death in 2012. The project was announced on the official Gerry Anderson website in July 2013, and the books were completed by author M. G. Harris based on Anderson's own notes and outlines.

== Development ==
After Gerry Anderson died in December 2012, his son Jamie Anderson approached children's book author M. G. Harris (known for The Joshua Files children's book series) to help finish his started book series. Using the crowdfunding platform Kickstarter, the book project was launched on 5 September 2013, with a set goal of £24,350 (about $39,000). On 5 October 2013, the deadline was reached, and the project had exceeded its goal, gathering £33,463 (about $53,000). With the collected funds, Harris' agent Robert Kirby was able to negotiate a publishing deal with Orion Publishing Group, with the first book entitled Black Horizon announced for release by Orion Children's Books in 2015. Designer/illustrator Andrew Probert was also brought on board to design the various craft of the Gemini Force fleet.

== Installments ==
=== Black Horizon ===
After the father of Ben Carrington dies, his mother contacts a rich entrepreneur and establishes an elite organization - the Gemini Force. The Gemini Force are a top-secret organization with the aim of providing rescue services. Ben is determined to become part of the team, but needs to prove to his mother first, that he has got what it takes.

=== Ghost Mine ===
Ben Carrington becomes a member of Gemini Force, fulfilling a long-standing goal. However, he continues to be affected by the deaths of his parents. The team is dispatched to respond to a report of illegal "ghost" miners trapped following a mining disaster in South Africa. During the mission, it is revealed that the company, Auron is unwilling to assist in locating the miners. Ben must determine whom tho trust as Gemini Force attempts to complete the mission.

=== White Storm ===
Ben Carrington is a member of an elite, top-secret rescue organisation - Gemini Force. When he finds himself and his friends in danger, Ben must compete with hostile ice and storms to pull off their most gruelling mission yet.

== Reception ==
The release of Black Horizon was met with widely positive reviews. Starburst Magazine praised author M.G. Harris as "a very skilled storyteller, weaving together narrative strands into one compelling experience", and as a Young Adult novel, a young reviewer as part of the Guardian's Children's Book site described it as "a really fun book that will never get old." Reviewers were also keen to make comparisons to Anderson's previous TV series Thunderbirds, with What Culture describing the book as "the true successor to Thunderbirds’ crown."
