= Charles Thake =

Maltese actor (1927–2018)

Charles Thake (21 December 1927 – 12 May 2018) was a Maltese actor. Born in Senglea, Thake was known mainly for comic parts and for interpreting theatrical performances, as well as on television and radio. He has also contributed in stations of the Public Broadcasting Services. Began his career at the age of 15. He participated in television series as on the television drama F'Bahar Wiehed (1970s), the first Maltese-language television series, which broadcast on TVM.

He took part as an actor in several foreign films like Agora (2009), Black Eagle (1988), Midnight Express and Treasure in Malta (1963). Whilst filming Agora he suffered minor facial injuries on the set when he collided with extras running during a scene.

He was also popular with the Maltese community in Australia. He was married to Lina, who died on 15 January 2017 at the age of 85, with whom he had six children. He died on 12 May 2018 at the age of 90.
