= The Joshua Files =

- All five books of the series.
- Invisible City; Ice Shock; Zero Moment; Dark Parallel; Apocalypse Moon
- Author: M.G Harris
- Country: United Kingdom
- Language: English
- Genre: Thriller; Children's
- Publisher: Scholastic Corporation
- Published: February 2008 - April 2012
- Media type: Print (Paperback)
- No. of books: 5

The Joshua Files is a thriller book series aimed at pre-teens/teenagers written by British author M. G. Harris. The mythology of the series includes a fictional prophecy of the ancient Maya of a catastrophic event that will occur in December 2012.

It follows the story of young Joshua Garcia (Josh) as he travels in the Mayan ruins following the work of his archaeologist father Andres Garcia. He is accompanied by his three friends: 15-year-old Tyler Marks, a fellow capoeira fighter; 14-year-old Ixchel, his forced wife-to-be; and his 18-year-old cousin, Benicio. The first book, Invisible City, was published in February 2008. The second, Ice Shock, was published in March 2009, the third, Zero Moment, in Feb 2010, and the fourth, Dark Parallel, in April 2011. The fifth and final book, Apocalypse Moon, was released in April 2012.

== Installments ==
=== Invisible City ===
Joshua Garcia, the main character of the story is a 13-year-old boy. One day, while practicing Capoeira in his martial arts class, he is asked promptly to leave for home, where he receives the news of his father's death in a plane crash in Mexico. Joshua refuses to believe this story and finds some extremely strange and baffling facts about his father's death. He comes up with his own conspiracy theory — abduction by aliens — after having seen UFOs in the sky. Later the investigators say that Andres (his father, an archaeologist) had been murdered by the husband of a woman, with whom he supposedly had 'affairs'. Joshua reads his dad's emails and finds out that his father was involved in the search for an ancient Maya script called the Ix codex. He sets up a blog to write about his conspiracy theories where he meets Ollie, or Olivia Dotrice (also known as TopShopPrincess) and Tyler Marks at a bookstore. He also meets his long lost sister but she is killed in a swamp. The story revolves around their investigation of Andres' murder and search for the Ix Codex and the lost cities of Ek Naab and Chechan Naab.

=== Ice Shock ===
Ice Shock is the sequel to Invisible City. Josh is back home, trying to resume his normal life and make sense of his Mayan adventures. But soon it becomes clear that being back in Oxford does not mean Josh can escape his destiny. He is even more certain now that his father's death was no accident—and he's starting to wonder if he can really trust his closest allies. There is a traitor among him; is it Tyler or Ollie? Soon after, Benicio reunites him and Ixchel. When he finds out The Sect are following him, he can not hide. On top of that Simon Madison is out for revenge. His adventures lead him to an ancient mountain where he finds out a shocking secret. That is when the real adventure begins.

=== Zero Moment ===
Zero Moment is the third book in the series. Josh is trying to learn what the Sect of Huracan is actually trying to do, Josh realises there is no turning back now. He travels to Brazil to contend in a capoeira contest with Tyler and his mother. They come across Carlos Montoyo and Ixchel and the five go on an adventure buggy ride across the desert. Just when Josh thinks everything is alright, Tyler, his mother and Ixchel are kidnapped by the Sect. After returning to Ek Naab, Josh thinks he has discovered the key to time travel. Should he use it to go back in time and save his father? Ixchel knows what he intends to do. Should she stop him? It is up to Josh to travel to the zero moment, change time and try to save his father, and potentially save the world.

=== Dark Parallel ===
The fourth in the series was released on 4 April 2011. Josh and Ixchel have travelled back in time, but it might not be so easy to get home again. They have landed in the Mayan era, when the prophecy about the world ending in 2012 was first foretold. And they cannot believe who they have found there. Clearly Josh is not the only person to have cracked the secret of time travel. But a bigger surprise awaits the pair when they return to the 21st century. It seems that the Bracelet of Itzamna has created a parallel universe where only one revival chamber exists. Nothing is quite as they remember it - and it is up to them to work out why this has happened. With scenes of wild chases and races.

=== Apocalypse Moon ===
The fifth and final book was released on April 5, 2012. After running out of ideas on how to protect the world from 2012 galactic superwave, Josh decides to use the Bracelet of Itzamna to time-jump into the future. He witnesses a complete apocalypse in a reality in which the superwave hits earth and the Sect of Huracan take over the world's governments. In order to save the world, he returns to his time and searches for the "moon machine", a device that will protect the world from the superwave. With the help of the last of the Erinsi and his friend Tyler, he manages to establish a force field around earth, that holds back the electromagnetic wave.

== The Descendant - Alternate Reality Game ==
Ice Shock was launched in the UK (Mar 2009) along with The Descendant, an ARG in which another story from The Joshua Files unfolded. The Descendant included material from a dozen websites, including videos, blogs and an avatar chat site, as well a clue printed in the UK edition of Ice Shock itself.

== Competitions ==
M.G Harris has organized some competitions for the books, These are Crack the Code, Crack the Code - The Second Code and Make your own fake ICE SHOCK video trailer.

== Neon-Sleeve Jacket ==
The UK, French, German, Spanish, Catalan and Hungarian editions feature a much-commented-upon, highly innovative jacket design - a neon PVC removable sleeve with a die-cut 'J'. The designer is Andrew Biscombe of Scholastic Children's Books UK. Invisible City was published with a luminous orange sleeve, Ice Shock with a luminous green/yellow sleeve and Zero Moment a dark green. For book 3, Zero Moment, the neon-sleeved edition has been restricted to a limited collectible version of only 4700 in the UK, all of which were signed by M.G. Harris. Invisible City and Ice Shock have now gone through the same routine, with the neon sleeve versions no longer being made and being made collectable. They are now being published in paperback as well but still following the same colour line. Book four, Dark Parallel, was published with the neon cover being made at a normal basis, not a collectors edition. The cover is a shade of blue this time. The normal paperback version was published in September 2011 with a black cover and a red 'J' printed on the cover. The last book in the series, Apocalypse Moon, which was published in April 2012 has a black PVC sleeve. The normal paperback version was published in July 2012.
