= Gerry Anderson =

English producer and director (1929–2012)

Gerry Anderson MBE
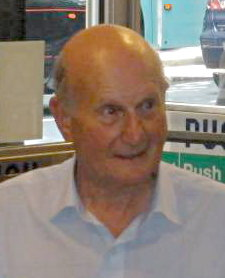
- Anderson in 2009
- Born: Gerald Alexander Abrahams; 14 April 1929; Bloomsbury, London, UK
- Died: 26 December 2012 (aged 83); Henley-on-Thames, Oxfordshire, UK
- Occupations: Film producer; television producer; writer; director; voice artist
- Years active: 1957–2005
- Employer: Lew Grade (1961–1976)
- Organizations: AP Films; Century 21 Organisation; Group Three; Gerry Anderson Productions; Anderson Burr; Anderson Entertainment
- Known for: Supercar; Fireball XL5; Stingray; Thunderbirds; Captain Scarlet and the Mysterons; Joe 90; UFO; Space: 1999; Terrahawks; Space Precinct
- Spouses: Betty Wrightman (m. 1952; div. 1960); Sylvia Thomas (m. 1960; div. 1981); Mary Louise Robins (m. 1981)
- Children: 4, including Jamie
- Website: Official website

Gerald Alexander Anderson (né Abrahams; 14 April 1929 – 26 December 2012) was an English television and film producer, director, writer and occasional voice artist, who is known for his futuristic television series, especially his 1960s productions filmed with "Supermarionation" (marionette puppets containing electric moving parts).

Anderson's first TV production was the 1957 Roberta Leigh children's series The Adventures of Twizzle (1957–58). Torchy the Battery Boy (1960), and Four Feather Falls (1960) followed. Supercar (1961–62) and Fireball XL5 (1962–63) came next, both series breaking into the American market in the early 1960s. In the mid-1960s Anderson produced his most successful series, Thunderbirds. Other productions of the period included Stingray, Captain Scarlet and the Mysterons and Joe 90.

Anderson also wrote and produced several feature films, including Doppelgänger (aka Journey to the Far Side of the Sun, 1969). Following a shift towards live-action productions in the 1970s, he had a long and successful association with media impresario Lew Grade and Grade's company ITC, continuing until the second series of Space: 1999.

After a lull, in which a number of new series failed to materialise, Anderson began a new phase in his career in the early 1980s, when nostalgia for his earlier Supermarionation series, prompted by Saturday morning re-runs in Britain and Australia, led to new commissions. Later projects included a 2005 computer-animated remake of Captain Scarlet titled New Captain Scarlet. Anderson died in 2012.

== Early life ==
Gerald Alexander Abrahams was born in 1929 to Jewish parents Deborah (née Leonoff) and Joseph Abrahams in the Elizabeth Garrett Anderson and Obstetric Hospital in Bloomsbury, London. His parents had immigrated from Eastern Europe. He was raised in Kilburn, and Neasden, London. He was educated at Kingsgate Infants School in Kilburn and Braintcroft Junior and Senior schools in Neasden, prior to winning a scholarship to Willesden County Grammar School.

At the start of the Second World War, Anderson's elder brother, Lionel, volunteered for service in the Royal Air Force (RAF); he was stationed in the United States for advanced training. Lionel often wrote letters to his family, and in one letter described an Army Air Forces base called Thunderbird Field, the name of which stayed in his younger brother's memory. Lionel was killed in action on 27 April 1944 when his de Havilland Mosquito was shot down over the Netherlands.

== Career ==
Anderson began his career in photography, earning a traineeship with the British Colonial Film Unit after the war. He developed an interest in film editing and moved on to Gainsborough Pictures, where he gained further experience. In 1947, he was conscripted for National Service with the RAF, and was based at RAF Manston. He served part of his time in air traffic control.

Two incidents in his final year with the RAF had a profound effect on Anderson. The first occurred during an aircraft display on 18 September 1948 commemorating the Battle of Britain, when a Mosquito aircraft crashed on a road crowded with occupied cars; reports on the death toll ranged between twelve and 20 people. On another occasion, a Spitfire was coming in to land. It was only about 50 feet (15 m) above the ground before the runway controller alerted the pilot to the fact the plane's undercarriage had not lowered. The pilot opened up the throttle and climbed away. As this was a moment Anderson always remembered, he found it all too easy to write about aircraft when he devised stories for Thunderbirds.

After completing his military service, Anderson returned to Gainsborough, where he worked until the studio was closed in 1950. He then worked freelance on a series of feature films. In the mid-1950s, he joined the independent TV production company Polytechnic Studios as a director, where he met cameraman Arthur Provis. After Polytechnic collapsed, Anderson, Provis, Reg Hill and John Read formed Pentagon Films in 1955. Pentagon was wound up soon after and Anderson and Provis formed a new company, AP Films, for Anderson-Provis Films, with Hill and Read as their partners. Anderson continued his freelance directing work to obtain funds to maintain the fledgling company.

AP Films' first venture was produced for Granada Television. Created by Roberta Leigh, The Adventures of Twizzle (1957–1958) was a series for young children about a doll with the ability to 'twizzle' his arms and legs to greater lengths. It was Anderson's first work with puppets, and the start of his long and successful collaborations with puppeteer Christine Glanville, special effects technician Derek Meddings and composer/arranger Barry Gray. It was Anderson's desire to move into live-action television.

The Adventures of Twizzle was followed by another low-budget puppet series with Leigh, Torchy the Battery Boy (1958–1959). Although the APF puppet productions made the Andersons world-famous, Anderson was always unhappy about working with puppets. He used them primarily to get attention from and a good reputation with TV networks, hoping to have them serve as a stepping stone to his goal of making live-action film and TV drama.

=== Supermarionation ===
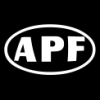
AP Films logo

AP Films' third series was the children's western fantasy-adventure series Four Feather Falls (1959–60). Provis left the partnership, but the company retained the name AP Films for several more years. Four Feather Falls was the first Anderson series to use an early version of the so-called Supermarionation process, though this term had yet to be used.

Despite APF's success with Four Feather Falls, Granada did not commission another series from them, so Anderson took up the offer to direct a film for Anglo-Amalgamated Studios. Crossroads to Crime was a low-budget B-grade crime thriller, and although Anderson hoped that its success might enable him to move into mainstream film-making, it failed at the box office.

By this time, APF was in financial trouble and the company was struggling to find a buyer for their new puppet series. They were rescued by a fortuitous meeting with Lew Grade, the Associated Television (ATV) boss who offered to buy the show. This began a long friendship and a very successful professional association between the two men.

The new series, Supercar, (1960–61) was developed by Anderson, Hill and Sylvia Thamm and marked several important advances for APF. Thamm, whom Anderson married in 1960, took on a larger role and became a partner in the company. The series was also the official debut of Supermarionation, the electronic system that made the marionettes more lifelike and convincing on screen. The system used the audio signal from pre-recorded tapes of the actors' voices to trigger solenoids installed in the heads of the puppets, making their lips move in synchronisation with the voices of the actors, and actresses.

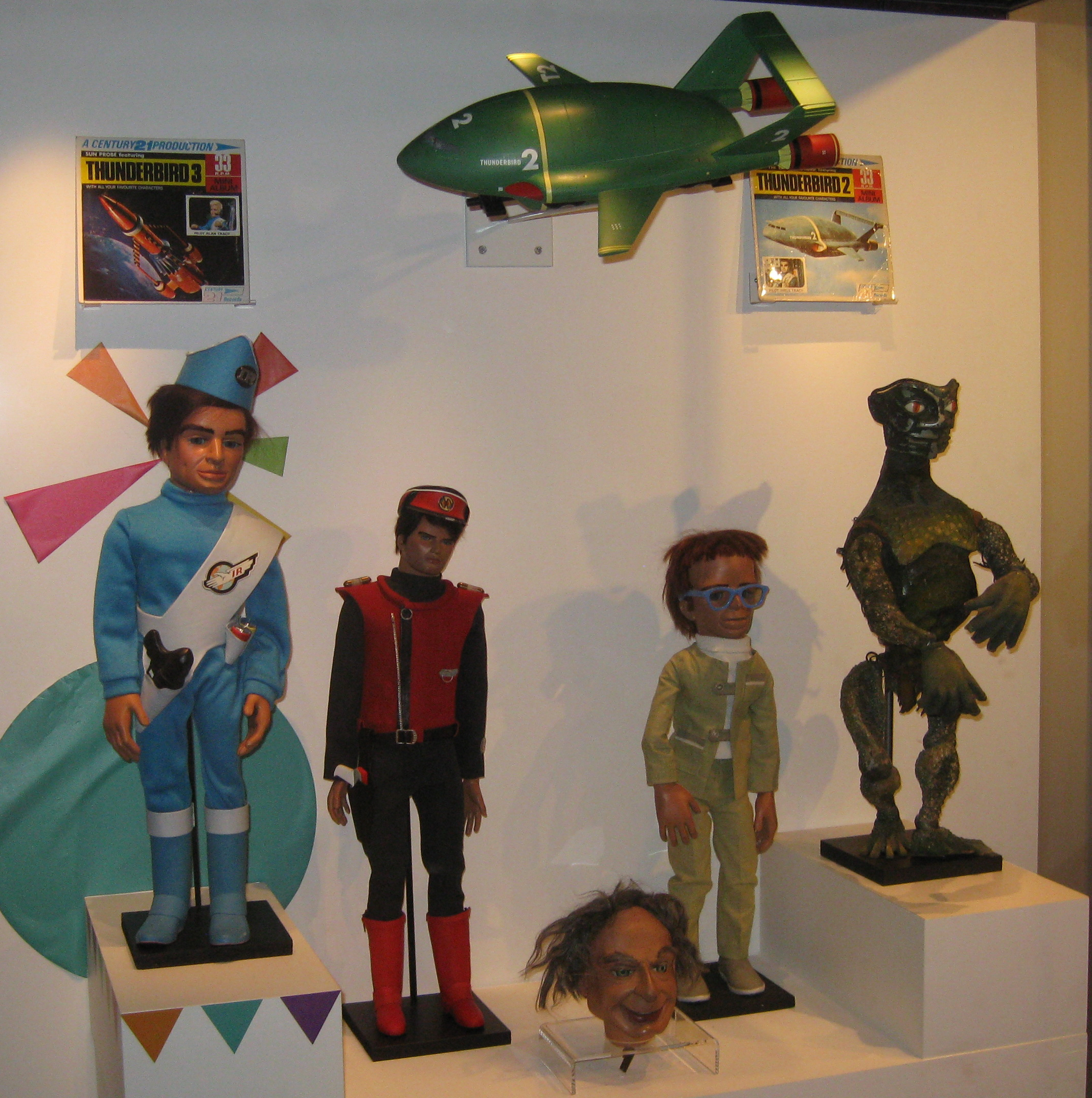
Anderson marionettes on display at the National Media Museum, Bradford

One of Anderson's most successful ventures was inaugurated during the production of Supercar. The establishment of AP Films (Merchandising) Ltd, a separate company set up to handle the licensing of merchandising rights for APF properties, was headed by Keith Shackleton, a long-time friend of Anderson's from their National Service days.

The next series by APF was the futuristic space adventure Fireball XL5 (1962). At the time it was the company's biggest success, garnering the honour of being the only Anderson series sold to an American TV network, NBC. Around this time, Anderson also saw his Supermarionation style attract imitators—most notably Space Patrol which used similar techniques and was made by several former employees and associates of Anderson, including Arthur Provis and Roberta Leigh.

After the completion of Fireball XL5, Lew Grade offered to buy AP Films. Although Anderson was initially reluctant, the deal eventually went ahead, with Grade becoming the managing director, and the Andersons, Hill, and Read becoming directors of the company.

Shortly after the buyout, APF began production on a new marionette series, Stingray (1964), the first British TV series to be filmed entirely in colour. For the new production APF moved to new studios in Slough. The new and bigger facilities allowed them to make major improvements in special effects, notably in the underwater sequences, as well as advances in marionette technology, with the use of a variety of interchangeable heads for each character to convey different expressions.

=== Thunderbirds ===
APF's next project for ATV was inspired by a mining disaster that occurred in West Germany in October 1963. This real-life drama inspired Anderson to create a new programme format about a rescue organisation, which eventually became his most famous and popular series, Thunderbirds (1965–1966). The dramatic title was inspired by the letter Anderson's older brother Lionel had written to his family during World War II.

Grade was very enthusiastic about the concept and agreed to back a series of 25-minute episodes (the same length as Stingray), so the Andersons scripted a pilot episode, "Trapped in the Sky", and began production. Anderson initially wanted actress Fenella Fielding to perform the voice of Lady Penelope, but Sylvia convinced her husband that she herself ought to play the role. Thunderbirds also marked the start of a long professional association with actor Shane Rimmer, who voiced Scott Tracy.

Production on Thunderbirds had been under way for several months when Grade saw the completed 25-minute version of "Trapped in the Sky". He was so excited by the result that he insisted that the episodes be extended to fifty minutes. With a substantial increase in budget, the production was restructured to expand episodes already filmed or in pre-production, and create new 50-minute scripts for the remainder. Grade and others were so convinced that Thunderbirds would be a success that a feature-film version of the series was proposed even before the pilot episode went to air. At this approximate time, APF was renamed Century 21 Productions.

After APF was renamed Century 21 Productions, it enjoyed its greatest success with Thunderbirds, and the series made the Andersons world famous. However, it was cancelled midway through the second series because Grade was unable to sell the show to an American network. Despite being wildly popular in the UK and abroad, Grade felt that without an American buyer, a full second series would fail to recoup its cost. It would later find moderate success in the United States through syndication.

During the production of Thunderbirds the Andersons' marriage began to come under increasing strain, and the company also had a setback when the feature film Thunderbirds Are Go flopped. In later interviews, Anderson said that he considered divorce, but this was halted when Sylvia announced that she was pregnant. Their son, Gerry Anderson Jr., was born in July 1967.

By that time, production had started on a new series, Captain Scarlet and the Mysterons (1967), which saw the advent of more realistic marionette characters which, thanks to improvements in electronics which allowed miniaturisation of the lip-sync mechanisms, could now be built closer to normal human proportions.

Century 21's second feature film, Thunderbird 6, was also unsuccessful, and the problems were compounded by their next (and penultimate) Supermarionation series, Joe 90 (1968). This series returned to more 'kid-friendly' territory, depicting the adventures of a young boy who is also a secret agent and whose scientist father uses a supercomputer called 'BIG RAT' which can 'program' Joe with special knowledge and abilities for his missions. Its relatively poor reception made it the last of the classic Anderson marionette shows.

=== Live-action work ===
Anderson's next project took the special effects expertise built up over previous TV projects and combined it with live action. Century 21's third feature film, Doppelgänger (1969; released internationally as Journey to the Far Side of the Sun) was a dark, Twilight Zone–style project about an astronaut who travels to a newly discovered planet on the opposite side of the sun, which proves to be an exact mirror-image of Earth, starring American actor Roy Thinnes. Although it was not a major commercial success, Doppelgänger was nominated for an Academy Award for its special effects.

Century 21's return to television was the abortive series The Secret Service, which this time mixed live action with Supermarionation. The series was inspired by Anderson's love of British comedian Stanley Unwin, who was known for his nonsense language, "Unwinese", which he created and used on radio, in film and most famously on the 1968 Small Faces LP Ogdens' Nut Gone Flake. Despite Anderson's track record and Unwin's popularity, the series was cancelled before its first screening; Lew Grade considered that it would be incomprehensible to American audiences, and thus unsellable.

In 1969 the Andersons began production of a new TV series, UFO, Century 21's first full live-action series. This science fiction action adventure starred American-born actor Ed Bishop (who had also provided the voice of Captain Blue in Captain Scarlet and The Mysterons) as Commander Ed Straker, head of the secret defence organisation SHADO, set up to counter an alien invasion. UFO was more adult in tone than any of Anderson's puppet series, and mixed Century 21's signature futuristic action-adventure and special effects with serious dramatic elements. UFO was the last series made under the Century 21 Productions banner.

During production of UFO, Anderson was approached by Harry Saltzman to write and produce the next entry in the James Bond film series, which was to be Moonraker. Collaborating with Tony Barwick to provide the characterisation, whilst he himself focused on the action sequences, Anderson wrote and delivered a treatment to Saltzman. Nothing ultimately came of it, and Broccoli and Saltzman proceeded to make Diamonds Are Forever (1971) and Live and Let Die (1973) and, after co-producing 1974's Bond film, The Man with the Golden Gun, the Saltzman-Broccoli partnership dissolved. Offered £20,000 for the treatment, Anderson refused, fearing that if he accepted he would not be at the helm when it was made; the next Bond film to be made was 1977's The Spy Who Loved Me. Anderson started legal proceedings against Broccoli for plagiarism of story elements but withdrew the action shortly after, nervous of the legal might lined up against him. He relinquished the treatment, and received £3,000 in compensation. A film version of Moonraker was eventually produced in 1979, but did not involve any of Anderson's material.

By the time UFO concluded, the relationship between the Andersons had deteriorated. Although produced under the aegis of a new company, Group Three Productions (the three being both of the Andersons and Reg Hill), Anderson decided not to work with his wife on his next project, the ITC action series The Protectors. It was one of Anderson's few non-original projects. Lew Grade himself was heavily involved in the programme, and cast both the lead actors, Robert Vaughn and Nyree Dawn Porter. The production was difficult for Anderson, who clashed with the famously difficult Vaughn. There were also many logistical problems arising from the Europe-wide filming of the show, but it was very successful in both the UK and America and its theme song "Avenues and Alleyways" became a hit record in the UK for singer Tony Christie. It was also the first live-action series produced by Anderson to survive to a second season.

=== Space: 1999 ===
Following The Protectors, Anderson worked on several new projects, none of which he was able to take into production. A proposed second series of UFO was not undertaken, and a return to marionettes in the television pilot for a series called The Investigator failed to find a buyer. Elements of the abandoned second series of UFO were eventually turned into what became the most expensive television series ever made at that time, Space: 1999.

Another futuristic science-fiction adventure, it was based on the premise that a huge thermonuclear explosion on the Moon's surface (caused by the storage of nuclear waste there) projected the Moon out of orbit and into interplanetary space. The series starred the American husband-and-wife actors Martin Landau and Barbara Bain, who had gained international fame in the TV series Mission: Impossible.

The Andersons' marriage broke down during the first series of Space: 1999 in 1975; Gerry announced his intention to separate on the evening of the wrap party. Sylvia severed her ties with Group Three, and, to alleviate his financial plight, Anderson sold his share of the profits from the APF/Century 21 shows and their holiday home in Portugal to Lew Grade.

Between making the two series of Space: 1999, Anderson produced a one-off television special, The Day After Tomorrow (also known as Into Infinity), about two spacefaring families en route to Alpha Centauri, for an NBC series of programmes illustrating current scientific theory for popular consumption.

Space: 1999 was successful enough that a second (and final) series went into production in 1976 with American producer Fred Freiberger brought in to replace Sylvia Anderson. Freiberger was known for producing the final season of the original Star Trek. Under Freiberger the series underwent a number of cast and cosmetic changes. Space: 1999 marked the end of Anderson's association with ATV.

By the late 1970s, Anderson's life and career were at a low point: he was in financial difficulty, found it hard to get work, and he experienced family difficulties.

=== 1980s ===
In 1981, episodes of many of Anderson's Supermarionation series were edited together as films, aired as Super Space Theatre. A number of similarly re-edited feature-length productions were also syndicated and released on home video, such as Destination: Moonbase Alpha, a re-edited version of a two-part Space: 1999 storyline. Some of these films were marketed in the US as part of a series of action-adventure videos featuring specially shot introductions by actress Sybil Danning.

In the early 1980s, Anderson formed a new partnership, Anderson Burr Pictures Ltd, with businessman Christopher Burr. The new company's first production was based on an unrealised concept devised by Anderson in the late 1970s for a Japanese cartoon series. Terrahawks marked Anderson's return to working with puppets, but rather than marionettes this series used a new system dubbed "Supermacromation" which used highly sophisticated glove puppets—an approach inspired by the advances in this form of puppetry made by Jim Henson and his colleagues.

It featured another reuse of the Captain Scarlet/UFO formula of a secret organisation defending against aliens. Terrahawks ran successfully from 1983 to 1986 in the UK but fell short of a four-year American syndication deal by one season when the show was cancelled. Terrahawks retains a cult following to this day. Anderson had claimed on record that he would rather forget the show.

Anderson hoped to continue his renewed success with a series called Space Police, a new show mixing live action and puppets. The Space Police name had already been registered by another company, so Anderson's programme eventually emerged in 1995 as Space Precinct. A pilot film had previously been made with Shane Rimmer, but it took almost ten years to get the concept to the screen. In the meantime, Anderson and Burr produced the cult stop-motion animated series Dick Spanner, P.I., which enjoyed many showings on the British Channel 4 in the late 1980s and early 1990s. It was the final project completed by Anderson Burr. Anderson then joined the Moving Picture Company as a commercials director, and provided special effects direction for the musical comedy Return to the Forbidden Planet.

=== 1990s ===
The cult appeal of Thunderbirds and the other Supermarionation series grew steadily over the years and was celebrated by comedy and stage productions such as the hit two-man stage revue Thunderbirds FAB. In the early 1990s, ITC began releasing home video versions of the Supermarionation shows, and the profile of the shows was further enhanced by productions such as the Dire Straits music video for their single "Calling Elvis", which was made as an affectionate Thunderbirds pastiche (with Anderson co-producing), and by Lady Penelope and Parker appearing in a series of UK advertisements for Swinton Insurance.

In 1991 Gerry asked journalist and author Simon Archer to write his biography, following an interview by the latter for a series of articles for Century 21 magazine. In September that year in the UK, BBC2 began a repeat showing of Thunderbirds, which rivalled the success of its original run a generation before. This was also surprisingly the series' network television premiere, having never been shown nationally by ITV. It became so popular in Britain that toy manufacturers Matchbox were unable to keep up with the demand for the Tracy Island playset, leading children's show Blue Peter to broadcast a segment showing children how to construct their own for a second time, the first being during the original run. The fan base for the Anderson shows was now worldwide and growing steadily, and Anderson found himself in demand for personal and media appearances.

In response to this greater demand Anderson performed a successful one-man show in 1992, which Archer had written and constructed. Entitled An Evening with Gerry Anderson, it took the form of an illustrated lecture in which he talked about his career, and his most popular shows. He also made numerous media and personal appearances to tie in with revivals and video cassette releases of Stingray, Thunderbirds, Captain Scarlet and Joe 90.

Anderson was interviewed for the BBC's 1993 Doctor Who documentary, Thirty Years in the TARDIS. He joked that, despite his career of making children's programming, the "real tragedy of my life" was that his own son Jamie (appearing with him) was a Doctor Who fanatic.

By 1993 Archer published the trivia book Gerry Anderson's FAB Facts. Archer was killed in a car crash on the M25 motorway on his way to the publishers to collect one of the first print run to present to Anderson, and the book later had to be withdrawn from sale and thousands of copies destroyed as a result of a copyright dispute with ITC America.

The renewed interest enabled Anderson to return to TV production, but several projects including GFI (an animated update of Thunderbirds) did not make it into production. Finally, in 1994, Anderson was able to get Space Precinct into production. It was followed by Lavender Castle, a children's fantasy series combining stop motion and computer-generated imagery.

In the meantime, the biography, which had been set aside since Archer's death, had been picked up again and was completed by Stan Nicholls from Archer's original notes and manuscript, finally being published in 1996 shortly before Lavender Castle went into production.

Around this time Anderson was reunited with his elder son, Gerry Jr., Anderson reportedly experienced powerful feelings of animosity toward his ex-wife Sylvia at the idea she had been responsible for his enforced estrangement from his son.

=== Later career ===
By December 1999, Anderson was working on plans for a sequel to Captain Scarlet, and he showed early test reels at a few fan conventions. These reels had the visual design and characters looking very much as they had in the original show, although the vehicle designs had been somewhat modernised. Several years after the initial tests the project evolved into the remake New Captain Scarlet, by which time the entire appearance had been significantly updated.

Anderson was appointed Member of the Order of the British Empire in the 2001 Birthday Honours for services to Animation.

Along with his business partner John Needham, Anderson created another new series entitled Firestorm, financed by Japanese investors and featured anime style animation. Other planned shows with other Japanese backers, including Eternity failed to come to fruition. Firestorm was sold throughout south-east Asia. Anderson and Needham parted company in 2003.

Anderson was originally approached to be involved in a live-action feature film adaptation of Thunderbirds as far back as 1996, but he was actually turned away by the producers of the 2004 film Thunderbirds, which was directed by Jonathan Frakes, after first being invited to meet with them. He distanced himself overtly from the project, later turning down an offer of $750,000 simply to write an endorsement of the film shortly before its release. The film received poor critical reviews and was unsuccessful at the US box-office. Anderson disliked the film, describing it as "the biggest load of crap I have ever seen in my life".

New Captain Scarlet finally premiered in the UK in February 2005. The show cost £23 million to produce and was the most expensive children's programme ever to be made in the UK (until In the Night Garden... debuted two years later). Many companies invested in producing toys and merchandise. Broadcaster ITV incorporated the episodes into Ministry of Mayhem and showed them in two parts, separated by games and adverts. Disappointing merchandising sales followed. The accompanying comic lasted only six editions before being scrapped by its publishers. Anderson's displeasure at ITV's handling of the show was widely reported.

2005 also saw the 40th anniversary of Thunderbirds, and a wide range of merchandise was produced to celebrate the event. In 2006, ITV re-ran the entire series on its fledgling CITV channel. ITV4, another digital channel, also ran repeats of UFO and Space: 1999 up until the end of 2009.

== Personal life ==
On 16 October 1952, Anderson married Betty Wrightman (1929–2021). They had two daughters.

During the production of The Adventures of Twizzle, Anderson began an affair with secretary Sylvia Thamm. Following Anderson's divorce from his first wife, Anderson and Thamm were married in November 1960. They had a son, Dr Gerry Anderson Jr. (1967–2023), before divorcing in 1981.

While making The Day After Tomorrow, Anderson met Mary Robins, a secretary working at the studios. They married in April 1981 and had a son, producer Jamie Anderson.

== Death ==
In June 2012 it was reported that Anderson had been diagnosed with Alzheimer's disease. Anderson died in his sleep on 26 December 2012, at the age of 83. The news was announced on his son Jamie's website, who wrote, "I'm very sad to announce the death of my father, Thunderbirds creator, Gerry Anderson. He died peacefully in his sleep at midday today (26th December 2012), having suffered with mixed dementia for the past few years. He was 83."

Actor Matt Zimmerman, who voiced Alan Tracy and supporting characters in Thunderbirds, spoke to BBC News about Anderson's death praising his work saying "it's a big part of people's lives" saying also that "people speak of the shows with such affection, and I held Gerry with that kind of affection as well. I am very pleased to have known him and I feel very sorry for Jamie and his wife Mary." David Graham who voiced various Thunderbirds characters, said it was "a very sad day".

Tributes from across the world of television and radio poured in, among them TV presenter Jonathan Ross, DJ Chris Evans, comedian Eddie Izzard and actors Brian Blessed and John Barrowman. Ross commented "For men of my age his work made childhood an incredible place to be." Blessed, who worked with Anderson on Space: 1999 and The Day After Tomorrow said, "I think a light has gone out in the universe. He had a great sense of humour. He wasn't childish but childlike and he had a tremendous love of the universe and astronomy and scientists."

Fanderson chairman Nick Williams paid tribute to Anderson by saying "To those who met him Gerry was a quiet, unassuming but determined man. His desire to make the best films he could drove him and his talented teams to innovate, take risks, and do everything necessary to produce quite inspirational works. Gerry's legacy is that he inspired so many people and continues to bring so much joy to so many millions of people around the world."

The humanist funeral was announced for Friday 11 January 2013 at Reading Crematorium. Jamie Anderson went on to say that his father expressed his desire to let fans of the shows attend his funeral, alongside friends, family and cast members. Jamie also spoke about the number of messages sent by fans, saying, "We have been so touched by the outpouring of sympathy from all over the world. We have had messages from India, Uganda, Australia – and from people aged between seven to 70. It is so nice to know how my father touched people's lives across all the continents." Jamie went on to add, "But I'm proudest of him for the contribution he made to the Alzheimer's Society. He was so torn apart by his illness. But his involvement with the charity raised £1 million in just a year."

Anderson was cremated, following a ceremony that brought together hundreds of colleagues, family and fans. Anderson's coffin was decorated with a floral Thunderbird 2 as his body was taken into the service, where musical scores of the Thunderbirds theme tune and "Aqua Marina" from Stingray were played. Amongst the hundreds in attendance was car owner Melvin Jarvis, who drove to the service in a full-scale replica of FAB 1. Also in attendance was Shane Rimmer, the voice of Scott Tracy in Thunderbirds, who spoke about his time on the series: "It was a truly unique experience. Gerry's office was like the Oval Office at the White House at times, such was the mystique of the place. Thunderbirds really broke a mould as it was one of the first TV shows that had appeal on both sides of the Atlantic."

The first episode of Strange Hill High, "King Mitchell", was dedicated to his memory.

=== Legacy ===
On 25 March 2013, in an announcement on the official Gerry Anderson website, Jamie Anderson announced that a number of projects that his father had been unable to finish were being developed by his company Anderson Entertainment and would be financed primarily through Kickstarter crowdfunding. On 27 July 2013 the name of the first Gerry Anderson legacy project was announced as a trilogy of novels entitled Gemini Force One. The first novel, Black Orchid, was published in 2014. In 2019 a pilot episode for a new puppet-based science fiction series based on concepts developed by Anderson, Firestorm, was released on YouTube by Anderson Entertainment. It uses a combination of hand- and electronically controlled puppets and green screen effects in an updated form of Supermarionation dubbed "Ultramarionation". Production of a full-length series was scheduled to begin in 2019.

In 2026, Gerry Anderson was inducted into the Visual Effects Society Hall of Fame.

== Filmography ==
=== Film ===
==== Filmmaking credits ====
Year	Title	Director	Producer	Writer	Notes
1960	Crossroads to Crime	Yes	Yes		
1966	Thunderbirds Are Go		Executive	Yes	
1968	Thunderbird 6		Executive	Yes	
1969	Doppelgänger		Yes	Yes	a.k.a. Journey to the Far Side of the Sun
2000	Captain Scarlet and the Return of the Mysterons	Yes	Yes	Yes	Short film related to 2005 series intended as a pilot for a potential revival

==== Editing credits ====
Year	Title	Contribution
1945	The Wicked Lady	Assistant editor
1946	Caravan	Second assistant editor
1947	Jassy	Second assistant editor
1948	Snowbound	Second assistant editor
1950	So Long at the Fair	Sound editor
1950	The Clouded Yellow	Dubbing editor
1951	Never Take No for an Answer	Dubbing editor
1953	Appointment in London	Dubbing editor / Assembly cutter
1953	South of Algiers	Sound editor
1954	They Who Dare	Dubbing editor
1954	Devil Girl from Mars	Sound editor
1955	Abdulla the Great	Sound editor
1955	A Prize of Gold	Sound editor

=== Television ===
==== Filmmaking credits ====
Year	Title	Director	Producer	Writer	Creator	Notes
1955	You've Never Seen This!	Yes				Television short film
1956	Here Comes Kandy		Yes			Unsold pilot
1957	Martin Kane, Private Eye	Yes				Episode: "The Film Studio Story"
1957–58	The Adventures of Twizzle	Yes	Yes			39 ep.
1959	Torchy the Battery Boy	Yes	Yes			26 ep.
1960	Four Feather Falls	Yes	Yes		Yes	39 ep. / Dir. 18 ep.
1961–62	Supercar	Yes	Yes	Yes	Yes	39 ep. / Wr. 17 ep. / Dir. ep. "Rescue"
1962–63	Fireball XL5	Yes	Yes	Yes	Yes	39 ep. / Wr. 2 ep. / Dir. ep. "Planet 46"
1964–65	Stingray		Yes	Yes	Yes	40 ep. / Wr. ep. "Pilot"
1965–66	Thunderbirds		Yes	Yes	Yes	31 ep. / Wr. ep. "Trapped in the Sky"
1967–68	Captain Scarlet and the Mysterons		Yes	Yes	Yes	32 ep. / Wr. ep. "The Mysterons"
1968–69	Joe 90			Yes	Yes	30 ep./ Wr. 2 ep.
1969	The Secret Service			Yes	Yes	13 ep. / Wr. ep. "A Case for the Bishop"
1970–71	UFO	Yes	Yes	Yes	Yes	26 ep. / Wr. & dir. ep. "Identified"
1972–74	The Protectors		Yes		Yes	52 ep.
1973	The Investigator	Yes	Yes			Unsold pilot
1975–76	Space: 1999		Yes		Yes	48 ep.
1975	Special Treat		Yes			Episode: "Into Infinity"
1983–86	Terrahawks		Yes	Yes	Yes	Wr. 2 ep. / Pr. 39 ep. Co-Creator.
1986	Space Police		Yes	Yes		Unsold pilot related to Space Precinct
1987	Dick Spanner, P.I.		Yes			22 ep.
1993	GFI		Yes			13 ep. Pilot produced, but series abandoned.
1994–95	Space Precinct		Yes		Yes	25 ep.
1999	Lavender Castle		Yes	Yes	Yes	26 ep. / Wr. 19 ep.
2005	New Captain Scarlet		Yes		Yes	26 ep.

==== Voice acting credits ====
Year	Title	Voice role	Notes
1962–63	Fireball XL5	Robert the Robot / Other roles	37 ep.
2015	Terrahawks	Zeroid 29 (posthumous)	1 audio story

==== Other credits ====
Year	Title	Contribution	Notes
1962–63	Fireball XL5	Script supervisor	4 ep.
1964–65	Stingray	Script supervisor	36 ep.
1965–66	Thunderbirds	Script supervisor	31 ep.
1983–86	Terrahawks	Composer	39 ep.
1986	Space Police	Composer	
2003	Faiyâsutômu	Series consultant	26 ep.

=== Music video ===
- "Calling Elvis" for Dire Straits (1991)

=== Commercials ===
- Blue Skies Ahead (1960–61) – an infomercial style advertising campaign for Blue Car European coach tours, shown in 15-minute segments on British television

=== Other ===
- Thunderbirds 2086 (1982, Japanese anime series loosely based on Thunderbirds; unaffiliated with Anderson)
- Gemini Force One (2008, continued posthumously) – novel series

== Related works ==
Over the years, various British comics have published strips based on Anderson's creations. These started with TV Comic during the early 1960s, followed by TV Century 21 and its various sister publications: Lady Penelope, TV Tornado, Solo and Joe 90 (which were produced by a company affiliated with Anderson). In the 1970s there was Countdown (later renamed TV Action).

== In popular culture ==
The 2004 film Team America: World Police by Trey Parker and Matt Stone is a homage/parody of the work of Gerry Anderson.
