= Alias Mr. Hackenbacker =

- Thunderbirds episode
- Episode no.: Series 2 Episode 3
- Directed by: Desmond Saunders
- Written by: Alan Pattillo
- Cinematography by: Julien Lugrin
- Editing by: Harry MacDonald
- Production code: 29
- Original air date: 16 October 1966

Guest character voices
- Sylvia Anderson as; Madeline Telephone Operator: Ray Barrett as; François Lemaire Collins Captain Saville Control Tower Lieutenant: Peter Dyneley as; Commander Norman: Christine Finn as; Deirdre Captain Saville's Secretary: David Graham as; Skythrust Co-Pilot Ross London Airport Guard Paris Waiter 1st and 2nd Buyers: Paul Maxwell (uncredited) as; Captain Ashton 2nd Reporter: Jeremy Wilkin as; Mason D103 Pilot 1st Reporter

Episode chronology
| ← Previous "Path of Destruction" | Next → "Lord Parker's 'Oliday" |

"Alias Mr. Hackenbacker" is the 29th episode of Thunderbirds, a British Supermarionation television series created by Gerry and Sylvia Anderson and filmed by their production company AP Films (later Century 21 Productions) for ITC Entertainment. Written by Alan Pattillo and directed by Desmond Saunders, it was first broadcast on 16 October 1966 on ATV London and Anglia Television as the third episode of Series Two.

Set in the 2060s, Thunderbirds follows the missions of International Rescue, a secret organisation that uses technologically advanced rescue vehicles to save human life. The lead characters are ex-astronaut Jeff Tracy, founder of International Rescue, and his five adult sons, who pilot the organisation's primary vehicles: the Thunderbird machines. In "Alias Mr. Hackenbacker", the Skythrust airliner, designed partly by Brains, is hijacked by criminals intent on stealing its cargo: fashion designer François Lemaire's new collection, made of a revolutionary new fabric called Penelon named after Lady Penelope.

In 1967, Century 21 released an audio adaptation on vinyl EP record (catalogue number MA 123), narrated by David Graham as Brains. The episode had its first UK-wide network broadcast on 1 May 1992 on BBC2.

== Plot ==
London Airport unveils Skythrust, a luxury airliner claimed to be the safest aircraft ever built. Brains, the designer of Skythrust's unique safety system, attends the press launch under the alias "Hiram K. Hackenbacker". At the same time, Lady Penelope is in Paris, where she has agreed to model in a fashion show that will be held at the salon of leading designer François Lemaire. This event will showcase Lemaire's latest invention: "Penelon", a super-compactible and creaseless fabric named after Penelope. When Penelope finds that Lemaire's office has been filmed from a nearby rooftop and extensively bugged, presumably by industrial spies, she proposes that the venue be changed to Skythrust, which will be travelling from Paris to London for its maiden flight.

Skythrust takes off from Paris and Lemaire begins his show, with Penelope and two house models, Deirdre and Madeline, sporting various Penelon outfits to an enthusiastic response from a group of buyers. All is well until the final approach to London, when Madeline and a steward called Mason hijack the plane, holding the crew and passengers at gunpoint. Madeline and Mason are the criminals who have been spying on Lemaire and are intent on stealing the Penelon collection. Madeline orders Captain Ashton and his co-pilot to divert to a remote location in the Sahara, where she and Mason will rendezvous with their associates Ross and Collins and offload the Penelon.

Penelope uses a transmitter in her ring to alert International Rescue on Tracy Island. Jeff dispatches Scott in Thunderbird 1 followed by Virgil and Alan in Thunderbird 2. Scott intercepts Skythrust but Madeline warns him off. Virgil and Alan fly into the plane's path in an attempt to force the hijackers' surrender, but Madeline is undeterred and threatens to shoot Ashton, giving them no choice but to back down.

At the recommendation of Brains, who is still at London Airport, Virgil and Alan fire an inert missile into the belly of Skythrust, damaging the plane's undercarriage. With a desert landing now out of the question, Mason grudgingly orders the pilots to fly back to London, where Skythrust can make an emergency landing. Reaching the airport, Skythrust hits the runway hard and catches fire, prompting the pilots to activate the special feature that Brains designed: an ejectable fuel tank, which the control tower remote-detonates in mid-air to prevent an explosion on the ground. Madeline and Mason are arrested; meanwhile, Virgil and Alan fly to the Sahara and deal with Ross and Collins by using a live missile to blow up their desert vehicle. Back in London, the International Rescue team, Lemaire and the airport authorities celebrate their success with a champagne party.

== Regular voice cast ==
- Sylvia Anderson as Lady Penelope
- Peter Dyneley as Jeff Tracy
- Christine Finn as Tin-Tin Kyrano
- David Graham as Gordon Tracy and Brains
- Shane Rimmer as Scott Tracy
- Jeremy Wilkin as Virgil Tracy
- Matt Zimmerman as Alan Tracy

== Production ==
"Alias Mr. Hackenbacker" has more guest characters in speaking roles than any other Thunderbirds episode. It is the only episode to feature voices by Paul Maxwell, who was uncredited for his contributions. Maxwell had previously voiced Colonel Zodiac in Fireball XL5 and Captain Travers in Thunderbirds Are Go.

Some of the puppet sets representing Paris had previously appeared in "The Perils of Penelope", which is set partly in the same city. Other set elements, as well as some of the episode's miniature models, were originally built for Thunderbirds Are Go. While arriving for the press launch at the start of the episode, Brains flashes a security pass bearing the signature of an airport official called "A C Dunsterville"; in reality, this was the signature of Tony Dunsterville, one of the series' prop designers. Nearly 30 inserts of live hands were included in the episode to show complex actions that the puppets could not perform, like Penelope removing a sample of Penelon from a display case.

The Skythrust filming model was designed by special effects assistant Mike Trim. The idea of an aircraft being hijacked during its maiden flight would later inspire the plot of the second Thunderbirds feature film, Thunderbird 6, in which Brains designs an airship called Skyship One, which is taken over by an impostor crew.

== Reception ==
Rating "Alias Mr. Hackenbacker" three out of five, Tom Fox of Starburst magazine considers its "fashion espionage" premise entertaining and calls the episode one of Thunderbirds' "most light-hearted" instalments. In her 1991 autobiography, Sylvia Anderson wrote that the episode "blends adventure with feminine charm and style"; she also thought its story about aircraft hijacking to be quite topical, as at the time Thunderbirds was made this was still a "newly acquired threat". Alistair McGown views Penelon as a futuristic successor to synthetic fibres like nylon.

Praising the episode, Stephen La Rivière believes that it highlights what he considers to be the improved characterisation and costume design of Thunderbirds' later episodes. McGown argues that the plot should appeal to boys and girls alike, calling its combination of fashion and aviation themes a "perfect example of the show's cross-gender strategy". Marcus Hearn expresses a similar view, describing the "successful integration of such diverse storylines" as a "testament to the second series' increased sophistication". He likens the script to comics writing, suggesting that the episode could have been devised for readers of Century 21's children's weeklies TV Century 21 and Lady Penelope. Although Hearn praises the "Art Deco" production design, he argues that the episode would have been better served had there been more women in the voice cast; to illustrate, he points out that Penelope and Madeline are both voiced by Sylvia Anderson, with the result that whenever the two characters converse, Anderson is essentially talking to herself.
