= Lord Parker's 'Oliday =

- Thunderbirds episode
- Episode no.: Series 2 Episode 4
- Directed by: Brian Burgess
- Written by: Tony Barwick
- Cinematography by: Julien Lugrin
- Editing by: Harry MacDonald
- Production code: 30
- Original air date: 23 October 1966

Guest character voices
- Peter Dyneley as Professor Lungren; David Graham as the cruise passenger; Charles Tingwell as Bruno and Mitchell; Jeremy Wilkin as Faccini

Episode chronology
← Previous "Alias Mr. Hackenbacker"	Next → "Ricochet"

"Lord Parker's 'Oliday" is the 30th episode of Thunderbirds, a British Supermarionation television series created by Gerry and Sylvia Anderson and filmed by their production company AP Films for ITC Entertainment. Written by Tony Barwick and directed by Brian Burgess, it was first broadcast on 23 October 1966 on ATV London and Anglia Television as the fourth episode of Series 2. The episode had its first UK-wide network broadcast on 8 May 1992 on BBC2.

Set in the 2060s, Thunderbirds follows the missions of International Rescue, a secret organisation which uses technologically‑advanced rescue vehicles to save human life. The lead characters are ex‑astronaut Jeff Tracy, founder of International Rescue, and his five adult sons, who pilot the organisation's primary vehicles: the Thunderbird machines. In "Lord Parker's 'Oliday", International Rescue agents Lady Penelope and Parker are holidaying in the Mediterranean town of Monte Bianco when a nearby solar power station is damaged in a storm, leaving its collector dish pointing directly at the town. International Rescue must find a way to re-angle the dish before its beam of concentrated solar energy burns through Monte Bianco.

The title's H-dropping on the word "holiday" mimics the character Parker, who speaks in a hypercorrected Cockney accent.

== Plot ==
Lady Penelope and Parker leave England for a holiday in the Mediterranean coastal town of Monte Bianco, checking into a hotel run by Mr Faccini. Thanks to the work of Professor Lungren and his assistant Mitchell, the town is set to become the first in the world to be powered entirely by solar energy. Bruno, the hotel's pessimistic steward, fears that this will lead to "great disaster".

That night, the hotel guests attend a fancy dress banquet to celebrate the activation of Lungren's mountaintop solar station. A storm rolls in and the station's tower is hit by lightning strikes, cutting power to the town. The tower's dish breaks off and rolls down the mountain, coming to rest pointing directly at Monte Bianco. Later, the storm clears and the hotel guests marvel as the dish reflects the Moon, concentrating its light and casting a silvery glow over the town. Bruno, however, is dreading the sunrise. Penelope thinks she knows why and uses FAB 1's videophone to alert International Rescue, taking the car out to sea on its hydrofoils to avoid radio interference from the nearby mountains. On Tracy Island, scientist Brains predicts that when the dish begins to reflect sunlight, the energy projected at Monte Bianco will heat the town until it ignites. Jeff dispatches Scott, Virgil, Alan and Brains in Thunderbirds 1 and 2 with orders to avert disaster.

As dawn approaches, Penelope drives to the solar station to check on Lungren and Mitchell. The station's radio has been damaged in the storm, preventing them from calling for outside help. Back at the hotel, Parker has a plan to keep the guests on hand to fight any fires that might break out: posing as an English lord, he uses his pretend authority to gather everyone together for a very special game: "Lord Parker's Bingo".

Using aerial reconnaissance from Scott in Thunderbird 1, Brains suggests attaching a line to the dish from Thunderbird 2 and using the aircraft's thrusters to angle the dish away from the town. Donning a heat suit, Brains is winched down to guide the line into place, but the thrusters fail to move the dish. Brains discovers that the rotation gears are jammed and burns through them with a laser cutter. Seeing the hotel roof beginning to smoulder, Scott activates a device on Thunderbird 1 which fills the air with smoke, blocking out the sun and stopping the flow of reflected solar energy. A second attempt to move the dish is successful, ending with the structure toppling over. Virgil and Alan are dismayed to see a figure that appears to be Brains buried in the wreckage, but it is only Brains' discarded heat suit.

As Monte Bianco returns to normal, Penelope and Parker – the latter now finished playing a lord – prepare to resume their holiday.

== Regular voice cast ==
- Sylvia Anderson as Lady Penelope
- Peter Dyneley as Jeff Tracy
- Christine Finn as Grandma Tracy
- David Graham as Brains and Parker
- Shane Rimmer as Scott Tracy
- Jeremy Wilkin as Virgil Tracy
- Matt Zimmerman as Alan Tracy

== Production ==
The solar station miniature model was designed by special effects assistant Mike Trim. "Lord Parker's 'Oliday" also features models, props, music and stock footage from earlier productions. The model quayside from which FAB 1 launches onto the sea was recycled from the feature film Thunderbirds Are Go, as was an introductory shot of Tracy Island. The episode also re-uses footage from "The Perils of Penelope" and "The Cham-Cham", in addition to models and props from "The Man from MI.5", "End of the Road" and "Sun Probe". The puppet that plays Mitchell previously appeared as Captain Ashton in "Alias Mr. Hackenbacker". Some of the incidental music was originally composed for the Supercar episode "Amazonian Adventure" and the Stingray's "Tune of Danger".

== Reception ==
Rating the episode three out of five, Tom Fox of Starburst magazine writes that while most of the story "ticks along nicely", Parker's reason for holding a bingo game makes "next to no sense". Marcus Hearn also questions the logic behind the game, wondering why the hotel is not simply evacuated instead. Although Hearn considers the script to be structurally flawed – arguing, for example, that Penelope is underused in the episode's second half – he believes that any deficiencies in the writing are compensated by the comedy scenes, such as the hotel costume party (for which Penelope dresses as Marie Antoinette, with Parker in Renaissance attire). He also calls the bingo game scenes a "hilarious spectacle".

Mark Braxton also praises the episode's comedy, writing that the cheerful Faccini and despairing Bruno make an entertaining double act. He singles out a scene in which Penelope, still dressed as Marie Antoinette, "drives" FAB 1 on water, to the astonishment of a man on a cruise yacht. Fox calls this scene the best part of the episode.

On the theme of energy supply, Hearn adds that given how Thunderbirds often highlights the dangers of nuclear power, this episode is "unusually pessimistic" about solar power as a more sustainable alternative. Braxton believes that the premise of "Lord Parker's 'Oliday" influenced the Thunderbirds Are Go episode "Ring of Fire", in which a solar collector dish is destabilised by undersea earthquakes and threatens to incinerate a town.

In her 1991 autobiography, Sylvia Anderson wrote that the episode depicts a "colorful backdrop of the Italian Riviera"; she also thought its story notes the futuristic concept of solar heat but Parker's game of bingo is considered to be a childhood thing of the past.
