= Brains (Thunderbirds) =

- Thunderbirds character
- The original puppet character
- First appearance: "Trapped in the Sky" (30 September 1965)
- Created by: Gerry and Sylvia Anderson
- Designed by: Mary Turner (puppet sculptor)
- Portrayed by: Anthony Edwards (2004 film)
- Voiced by: David Graham (1960s series and films); Kayvan Novak (remake series)

In-universe information
- Full name: Ray Hackenbacker (2004 film); Hiram K. Hackenbacker (remake series)
- Aliases: Hiram K. Hackenbacker (original series); Mr X (Thunderbird 6)
- Occupation: Engineer, scientist, inventor
- Affiliation: International Rescue
- Children: Fermat Hackenbacker (2004 film)
- Home: Tracy Island
- Nationality: American; Indian (remake series only)

Brains is a fictional character introduced in the British 1960s Supermarionation television series Thunderbirds, who also appears in the sequel films Thunderbirds Are Go (1966) and Thunderbird 6 (1968) and the 2004 live-action adaptation Thunderbirds. A genius inventor, Brains is Tracy Island's resident scientist and engineer and the designer of International Rescue's Thunderbird machines.

The puppet character was voiced by David Graham in the TV series and the first two films, while Anthony Edwards played the role for the live-action film. Brains is voiced by Kayvan Novak in the remake series Thunderbirds Are Go, which aired in 2015.

== Development ==
According to series co-creator Sylvia Anderson, Brains was conceived as "yet another version of our regular boffin-type characters who had appeared in all our previous series". She compares the character to Professor Matthew Matic (of Fireball XL5) and George Lee Sheridan, nicknamed "Phones" (of Stingray). Brains has also been viewed as an updated version Dr Beaker (of Supercar), an eccentric scientist who similarly stutters. The likeness of the Supermarionation puppet was influenced by the appearance of American actor Anthony Perkins.

Voice actor David Graham did not base Brains' tones on any person in real life. He explains that Brains' stutter – which he devised himself, without direction from the Andersons or scripts – was a natural evolution of his characterisation: "It seems that with clever people the mind works faster than the mouth can speak." It is likened by Simon Archer and Marcus Hearn to logical positivism, whereby "the mind recognises only unquestionable facts and often appears to work faster than the voice." Graham also interpreted the character as being "innocent and unsophisticated", and possessing qualities of "absent-mindedness" and "vagueness". Anderson expresses similar views, describing the role as that of "a young man pre-occupied and confident with his work and experiments, yet socially unsure of himself".

A negative effect of the character's delivery was the impact on the pacing of episodes: Anderson remembers that the stutter slowed the action, which potential distributors wanted to "move along fast", despite "bearing in mind that puppet action was slow enough without any speech impediments". She concludes that while all concerned were impressed by Graham's "original interpretation", the stammer proved to be "one of those experiments that worked better in the recording studio than on the screen". The scriptwriters solved the problem by abbreviating or cutting Brains' lines and limiting the character's appearances, to the extent that by the end of Series Two, his speech impediment had been eliminated. With Parker, Brains was Graham's joint favourite voice role for series.

In the 1980s, Gerry Anderson proposed to develop a Thunderbirds re-make, T-Force. As part of the updating of characters, vehicles and settings, Brains' myopia and stutter were to have been removed, and the character re-imagined as an eloquent computer scientist. In the late 1990s, before Jonathan Frakes replaced Peter Hewitt as director of the then-undeveloped live-action film adaptation, co-producer Tim Bevan approached comedian Rowan Atkinson with a view to offering him the role of Brains.

Anthony Edwards, who portrayed Brains in the completed 2004 film, enjoyed the role primarily on account of the character's stutter. In an interview for Starburst magazine, Edwards stated that his children "made me be absolutely true to the original Brains – it was very important to them." Marit Annen, the film's costume designer, pictured the character as "the kind of archetypal forgetful scientist; the only thing that's hi-tech about him is his shoes". The glasses that the live-action Brains wears, while intended to be reminiscent of the original "pebble lenses", were made as smaller and "slightly more modern" half-frame spectacles.

== Original series depiction ==
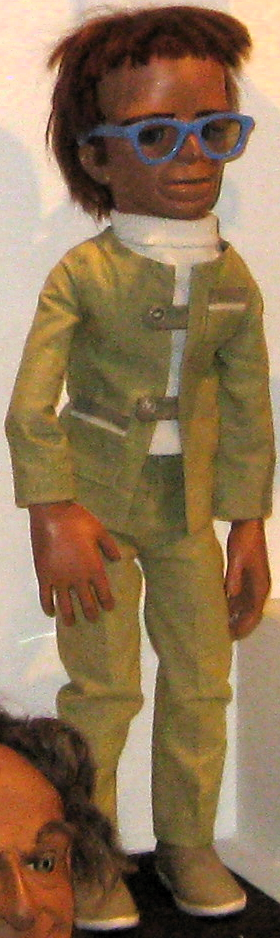
Replica Brains puppet in the National Media Museum, UK

Born on 14 November 2001 or 2040 in Michigan, United States, Brains was orphaned at the age of 12 when his family was killed in a hurricane. He was eventually adopted by a professor at the University of Cambridge, and discovered later on by Jeff Tracy, founder of International Rescue, while he was lecturing in Paris.

Brains is a mechanical and aerospace engineer who is considered to be fifty years ahead of his time and the world's greatest aircraft designer. He is a highly valued, if somewhat absent-minded and socially maladroit, member of IR and designed the Thunderbird machines and other vehicles and facilities used by the organisation and its agents. He is also known to invent in his spare time and once built a chess-playing robot called Braman (which fortuitously serves as an auxiliary computer in the episode "Sun Probe"). Brains' technical expertise is sometimes required in the field, in which case he usually accompanies the Tracy brothers in Thunderbird 2.

It has been mentioned a number of times, in at least Thunderbirds are go, that Brains has a tendency to over-engineer his inventions to ensure reliability and an ability to work in unexpected situations. As such, it is rare that the Thunderbird vehicles cannot handle the rescues they are assigned.

Brains has occasionally designed vehicles for organisations outside International Rescue as a freelance engineer. These include Skythrust (in the episode "Alias Mr. Hackenbacker") and Skyship One (in the film Thunderbird 6). Such commissions are built under strict security to maintain the secrecy of IR.

The character's birth name is not revealed in the series; while working on external projects, Brains uses a pseudonym to protect his identity. For example, he uses the alias "Hiram K. Hackenbacker" while working on the Skythrust project, and the board that commissions Skyship One knows him only as "Mr X".

=== Appearances ===
- "Trapped in the Sky"
- "Pit of Peril"
- "Terror in New York City"
- "Edge of Impact"
- "Day of Disaster"
- "30 Minutes After Noon"
- "Desperate Intruder"
- "End of the Road"
- "The Uninvited"
- "Sun Probe"
- "Operation Crash-Dive"
- "Vault of Death"
- "The Mighty Atom"
- "City of Fire"
- "The Man from MI.5"
- "Cry Wolf"
- "Danger at Ocean Deep"
- "Move – and You're Dead"
- "Brink of Disaster"
- "Attack of the Alligators!"
- "The Cham-Cham"
- "Security Hazard"
- "Atlantic Inferno"
- "Path of Destruction"
- "Alias Mr. Hackenbacker"
- "Lord Parker's 'Oliday"
- "Ricochet"
- "Give or Take a Million"
- Thunderbirds Are Go (film)
- Thunderbird 6 (film)

== Adaptations ==
In the 2004 film, his actual name is Ray Hackenbacker. He is said to have met antagonist Transom at an international conference on nanotechnology. According to Alex Pang's Thunderbirds: X-Ray Cross Sections, Jeff recruited Brains to International Rescue after he invented the 'Gravitron' artificial gravity plate for use in NASA's spacecraft. He also designed the "Hackenbacker series 3000 fusion reactor" for use in all Thunderbird craft (sans Thunderbird 4), the "Hackenbacker VTOL engine" for use in Thunderbirds 1 and 2, and the "Hackenbacker inchworm engine", named after his favourite insect, for use in Thunderbird 4.

Thunderbirds Are Go!, the 2015 reboot series, uses Hiram K. Hackenbacker as Brains' real name.

== Reception ==
Brains is widely considered to be one of the best-known characters devised for an Anderson series, and is described by Daniel Sperling of the entertainment website Digital Spy as one of a few Thunderbirds characters to "have almost become as beloved as the show". Stephen La Rivière argues that Brains is the series' "third iconic character" after Lady Penelope and Parker, and is distinctive for his "big, blue-rimmed glasses and stuttering American accent". Tom Eames of Digital Spy judges Brains to be among the most memorable puppet characters in television, writing that unlike some other series regulars, he is "somebody who everyone remembers. If you were going to bring a small group of TV characters on a rocket to start a new world, Brains should be high on the list."

Jon Abbott of TV Zone magazine is critical of Brains' status as "the stammering, bespectacled genius", judging it to be one of a number of dated stereotypes inherent in the series' writing. David Ryan of the website DVD Verdict is bemused by the stutter, arguing that it "comes off as slight retardation, or possibly brain damage. (Maybe he's an early version of Rain Man?)."

Daniel O'Brien comments on the close relationship between Brains and the Tracy family, judging the former to be Jeff's "surrogate sixth son". Ryan suggests that Brains is to the Tracys as music producer George Martin was to The Beatles. James Gray of the website The Digital Fix considers Brains to be "easily the highlight" of film sequel Thunderbird 6 (1968), praising the "amusing" and "entertaining" scenes in which he destroys rejected prototypes of the eponymous, proposed new vehicle (displaying "a side of him we haven't seen before"), as well as the character's major role in the rescue of the Skyship One passengers.

Critical response to Anthony Edwards' live-action portrayal has generally been negative. Gray is mildly complimentary, arguing that the character is spoiled only by his "silly haircut", which is considered "too mannered to be convincing". Although he questions the wisdom of giving the re-imagined Brains a son (Fermat Hackenbacker, played by Soren Fulton), he states that the scenes in which parent and child interact are "nicely done, and provide some rare warmth to proceedings". Ian Freer of Empire magazine judges Edwards' performance "uncomfortable", while Glenn Erickson of DVD Talk suggests that Brains and Fermat's "'funny' stutters" are poor substitutes for "real character traits". Ira Zimmerman of Minnesota State University, Mankato, in a study of film characters with stammers, states that Edwards' Brains "comes off like a wimp – an object of ridicule" and is less "heroic" than the "more interesting" Fermat.

=== Popular culture ===
La Rivière considers the character of Brains to occupy a special place in popular culture. The Independent observes that the name "has entered the English language for any high-foreheaded geek with over-sized specs", adding that the character was "representative of a type. He was the backroom boffin, diffident in speech and uncomfortable (my, those eyes used to roll about) in taking the foreground". Alastair Campbell, press secretary to former Prime Minister of the United Kingdom, Tony Blair, nicknamed Labour politician David Miliband "Brains" after the Thunderbirds character.

In 2004, news magazine The Economist used Brains' image as part of a billboard advertising campaign. In May 2008, a new TV advertisement for Britvic's Drench spring water was launched; it featured a puppet Brains dancing to the Snap! song "Rhythm Is a Dancer", with the slogan "Brains work best when hydrated". The official video proved to be popular on YouTube, where it inspired various remixes. Giles Wilson, writing for BBC News Magazine, praised the film's production values and suggested that it was "destined to be the memorable advert of this year", comparing it favourably to Cadbury's "Gorilla" promotions of 2007. BBC Radio 1 DJ Jo Whiley considered the advert "amazing"; Gerry Anderson deemed it "brilliant" and remarked that the writer should have been awarded for his joke "Good for Brains". The advert re-appeared in re-cut form, featuring the new slogan "Dehydrated brains don't perform well", in January 2009.
