= Thunderbird 6 =

1968 British science fiction puppet film directed by David Lane

- UK film poster
- Directed by: David Lane
- Screenplay by: Gerry & Sylvia Anderson
- Based on: Thunderbirds by Gerry & Sylvia Anderson
- Produced by: Sylvia Anderson
- Starring: Keith Alexander; Sylvia Anderson; John Carson; Peter Dyneley; Gary Files; Christine Finn; David Graham; Geoffrey Keen; Shane Rimmer; Jeremy Wilkin; Matt Zimmerman
- Narrated by: Keith Alexander
- Cinematography: Harry Oakes
- Edited by: Len Walter
- Music by: Barry Gray
- Production companies: Century 21 Cinema Productions; Associated Television
- Distributed by: United Artists
- Release date: 29 July 1968
- Running time: 89 minutes
- Country: United Kingdom
- Language: English
- Budget: £300,000

Thunderbird 6 is a 1968 British science fiction puppet film based on Thunderbirds, a Supermarionation television series created by Gerry and Sylvia Anderson. Written by the Andersons and directed by David Lane, it is the sequel to Thunderbirds Are Go (1966).

The main setting is Skyship One – a futuristic airship conceived by Brains, creator of the Thunderbird machines. Alan Tracy, Tin-Tin Kyrano, Lady Penelope and Parker represent International Rescue as the guests of honour on the airship's maiden flight, unaware that the Hood is once again plotting to steal the secrets of International Rescue's technology. Agents of the Hood murder Skyship One's crew and assume their identities to lure the organisation into a trap. Brains' efforts to design a sixth Thunderbird are accelerated when Skyship One is damaged and only Alan's restored Tiger Moth biplane can save everyone on board.

The film was shot between May and December 1967. Production company Century 21 redesigned the puppets to compromise between the caricatures that it used before and the realistically proportioned characters that it introduced in Captain Scarlet and the Mysterons. Some of the footage of the Tiger Moth in flight was filmed on location using a full-sized plane, but a legal dispute with the Ministry of Transport over alleged dangerous flying forced the crew to film the remaining shots with miniature models. Guest characters were voiced by John Carson and Geoffrey Keen, while Keith Alexander and Gary Files replaced Ray Barrett as the voices of John Tracy and the Hood.

Thunderbird 6 was released in July 1968 to a poor box office response that ruled out the production of further sequels. Critical response was mixed: commentators praised the special effects but were polarised by the story.

== Plot ==
In 2068, (Note: A newspaper seen in close-up is dated 11 June 2068 (Bentley 2005, p. 99; Bentley 2008, p. 305), placing Skyship One's maiden flight nine months after the conclusion to Thunderbirds Are Go and six months after the events of the final Thunderbirds episode, "Give or Take a Million" (Bentley 2005, p. 95). Captain Scarlet is also set in 2068.) the New World Aircraft Corporation in England gives Brains an open brief to design a revolutionary aircraft. Brains suggests an airship, prompting howls of laughter from the executives. Nevertheless, his proposal is accepted and the corporation builds Skyship One, a fully automated craft powered by an anti-gravity field. Representing International Rescue for the maiden flight – a round-the-world trip with computer-programmed stops – are Alan Tracy, Tin-Tin Kyrano, Lady Penelope and Parker. Brains is forced to stay on Tracy Island after Jeff asks him to design a sixth Thunderbird machine. Working without a specification, Brains produces a range of concepts but Jeff rejects them all.

Alan and Tin-Tin fly to England in Alan's restored Tiger Moth biplane. They meet up with Penelope and Parker and the four of them board Skyship One. As the airship departs on its voyage, the group are unaware that Captain Foster and the stewards have been murdered and replaced by agents of the Hood, now operating as "Black Phantom" from an abandoned airfield near Casablanca. (Note: The Hood was apparently killed in Thunderbirds Are Go but returns in Thunderbird 6 under a new codename (Bentley 2005, p. 98). In their audio commentary for the DVD release, Sylvia Anderson and David Lane referred to Black Phantom as the "son of the Hood" and said that he is seeking revenge for his father's death.) As the ship is automated, the impostors do not need to demonstrate any technical knowledge and are able to avoid raising their guests' suspicions.

After Skyship One leaves the Egyptian pyramids, Penelope finds a bugging device in her bedroom. Foster and his men have been recording and editing her voice to assemble a fake radio message asking Jeff to send Thunderbirds 1 and 2 to the airfield, where the Hood and his men plan to capture the two craft. Parker uncovers the editing equipment, but before the group can act, the impostors complete the message and transmit it to Tracy Island via Thunderbird 5. Jeff immediately dispatches Scott and Virgil in Thunderbirds 1 and 2, but Alan realises that his brothers are flying into a trap and Penelope manages to relay the warning just in time. Landing at the airfield, Scott and Virgil use the Thunderbirds' rocket launchers to destroy the Hood's base. They then take off to rendezvous with Skyship One.

Aboard the airship, the guests engage the impostors in a shootout. Tin-Tin is taken hostage, forcing their surrender. During the fighting, the anti-gravity system is damaged, causing the ship to lose altitude and crash into a radio mast at a missile base near Dover. With Skyship One balanced precariously on top of the mast and its anti-gravity field weakening, it is up to Scott, Virgil and Brains to rescue everyone on board before the ship collapses onto the base below. Scott and Virgil are unable to approach the airship without tipping it over with their thrusters and there are no Thunderbird 2's pod vehicles light enough to deploy onto it. At Gordon's suggestion, Brains flies the Tiger Moth up to the top deck to airlift the passengers and crew to safety, only to be held at gunpoint by Foster and his surviving henchmen. With Penelope a hostage in the plane's cockpit, Foster tries to take off but is shot dead by Alan. The Tiger Moth launches with the guests and impostors clinging on to the wings and landing gear. Shortly after, Skyship One finally crashes to the ground, starting a chain reaction that obliterates the missile base. (Note: FAB 1 is stored in Skyship One's cargo hold and is therefore destroyed with the airship (Bentley 2005, p. 99; Bentley 2008, p. 305; La Rivière, p. 173).)

The remaining impostors are killed in a gunfight aboard the Tiger Moth. Stray bullets puncture the fuel tank, forcing Penelope to make an emergency landing. After near misses with a factory chimney, a bridge on the M104 motorway and a tree, Penelope ditches the plane into a field. Parker is thrown out when the plane clips the tree top and ends up dangling in its branches before falling to the ground.

Back on Tracy Island, Brains unveils the new Thunderbird 6 as none other than the repaired Tiger Moth, which all agree has proven its worth in the field.

== Production ==
It was felt that we'd done the one with the hardware and that now we wanted to do something amusing. Out came this script with a Tiger Moth in it, which was as far removed from the hardware that was in Thunderbirds as anything I can think of.

— David Lane on the film's inspiration

Despite the critical and commercial failure of Thunderbirds Are Go, distributors United Artists (UA) ordered a sequel. Filmed on a budget of £300,000 (approximately £4.78 million in 2025), Thunderbird 6 had largely the same production credits as the first film; Gerry and Sylvia Anderson returned as writers and producers, while David Lane reprised the role of director.

The Andersons wrote the script in three months, originally intending the film to be about a "Russo-American space project". The focus was changed to an airship when their associate Desmond Saunders suggested basing the film on the destruction of the R101. In preparation, Gerry read books on the R101 and other airships, including the R100 and the Graf Zeppelin. The plot was intended to be more light-hearted than that of Thunderbirds Are Go. Presenting a de Havilland Tiger Moth as the eponymous Thunderbird 6, the script included a reference to Esso advertising: during the Dover rescue, a line of dialogue adapts the company's slogan "Put a Tiger in Your Tank" to refer to the "Tiger" in Thunderbird 2's pod. The full model name is not spoken.

Principal photography began on 1 May 1967 and was completed in four months.

=== Voice cast ===
Voice actor	Major characters voiced
Peter Dyneley	Jeff Tracy
Shane Rimmer	Scott Tracy, Steward Carter (original)
Sylvia Anderson	Lady Penelope
Jeremy Wilkin	Virgil Tracy, Steward Lane (original), Steward Martin (impostor)
Matt Zimmerman	Alan Tracy, Martin (original), Steward Hogarth (impostor)
David Graham	Gordon Tracy, Brains, Parker
Keith Alexander	John Tracy, Carter (impostor), the Narrator
Christine Finn	Tin-Tin Kyrano
Gary Files	Black Phantom, Captain Foster & Hogarth (original), Lane (impostor)
John Carson	Captain Foster (impostor)
Geoffrey Keen	NWAC President James Glenn

The film's dialogue was recorded in six days at the Anvil Films Recording Studio. Except for John Tracy and Black Phantom/the Hood, all the returning characters were voiced by the actors who had played them in the first film. The new additions to the voice cast were:

- Keith Alexander as John Tracy and the Narrator. Ray Barrett, the original voice of John, had returned to his native Australia. Alexander also provides a brief opening narration explaining the secrecy of International Rescue. He later voiced Sam Loover in Joe 90 and Agent Blake in The Secret Service before starring as Lieutenant Ford in UFO.
- Gary Files as Black Phantom. According to Files, his voice roles in Thunderbird 6 were a trial run for Captain Scarlet and the Mysterons, to which he supplied numerous guest character voices. More roles followed, including the regular voice of Matthew Harding in The Secret Service.
- John Carson as the impostor Captain Foster (codenamed "White Ghost"). Carson's guest roles in The Troubleshooters brought him to the attention of the Andersons. His delivery of Foster's dialogue has led to a mistaken belief that the character was voiced by James Mason.
- Geoffrey Keen as James Glenn, the president of the New World Aircraft Corporation. Keen was known to the Andersons for playing the lead role of Brian Stead in The Troubleshooters.

Simon Archer and Marcus Hearn suggest that Thunderbird 6 develops the character of Lady Penelope, thanks in part to a more mature reading of her lines by Sylvia Anderson. They also praise David Graham's contributions, especially his performance as Parker, but note that some of the regular characters from the TV series, such as John and Gordon Tracy, play only minor roles in the film.

=== Design ===
By the time Thunderbird 6 entered production, Century 21 had started filming its next TV series, Captain Scarlet. This series introduced a new puppet design that abandoned the caricatured look of the Thunderbirds marionettes in favour of realistic body proportions. The puppets of Thunderbird 6 were modelled to compromise between the old and the new designs: the heads and hands remained disproportionately large but the overall caricature was toned down. Most of the guest character puppets were recycled from Thunderbirds Are Go, although the Captain Foster puppet was a new creation. Puppeteer Wanda Webb remembered that Thunderbird 6 maintained high standards of puppet workmanship, commenting on a scene that shows Penelope asleep: "I had placed the sleeping eyelids in Plasticine and made the eye shadow a little too blue. We ended up re-shooting the whole sequence."

Examples of the Skyship One set design: the gravity compensation room (left) and the games room (right). On the left, Foster holds the International Rescue members at gunpoint; on the right, Parker, Lady Penelope and Tin-Tin radio Tracy Island. The puppets of Thunderbird 6 were more realistically proportioned than those of the earlier film and TV series.

A number of one-off puppets with gaping mouths (showing filled teeth) were made for the opening sequence in which Brains' proposal to build airship sends the NWAC executives into fits of laughter. Stephen La Rivière describes this as "a contender for the most horrific scene ever produced by Century 21". The decision to place the title sequence after a cold open was part of an effort to distinguish Thunderbird 6 from the previous film.

The Skyship One filming model was built by effects director Derek Meddings, who also oversaw the construction of scale replicas of the various locations seen in the film, such as the Great Sphinx of Giza and the Grand Canyon. A Swiss Alps sequence called for FAB 1, Penelope's Rolls-Royce, to skate across the ice with miniatures of Alan and Tin-Tin following on skis. To accommodate the amount of movement this entailed, the effects crew built a set 40 to 50 feet (12 to 15 m) wide. It was the largest set used on the film and was filled with salt to simulate snow.

Bob Bell's art department designed each of the rooms on Skyship One in a unique style. For example, the Ball Room contained spherical decor while the Games Room had a die and chessboards theme. Penelope's quarters, designed by Keith Wilson, were made pink to match the colour of FAB 1. Archer and Hearn comment that they resemble a "Barbara Cartland nightmare". During filming, the heat of the studio lights caused the floor of the Bottle Room set to catch fire, forcing the crew to rebuild it from scratch. The scene set inside the fictional Whistle Stop Inn – a railway-themed Swiss pub where customers are served meals on model trains – required careful planning and coordination.

=== Aerial stunts ===
[W]e were told that the Tiger should not fly under the bridge, but had to touch its wheels down and then taxi under the bridge, tail up. In the event, Joan was carrying dummies of the puppets strapped to the wings and she was barely able to maintain flying speed. As she approached the bridge, she was caught in a crosswind and the aircraft began to crab.

— Gerry Anderson on the M40 incident

Some of the scenes featuring the Tiger Moth, such as Alan and Tin-Tin leaving Tracy Island, were shot using scale models. Other scenes were filmed on location with a full-size Tiger Moth. Joan Hughes, a ferry pilot who had flown fighters and bombers in the Second World War, was hired to pilot the plane and be Lady Penelope's human stunt double. The other characters were represented by dummies tied to the wings and undercarriage. The live-action sequences include Brains' take-off, Penelope's struggle to control the plane, the gun battle with Foster's henchmen, the near misses with the motorway bridge and the chimney, and the crash-landing in the field.

The location shoot was held at Wycombe Air Park. By the end of summer, the grass around the park had turned brown, so the effects team corrected the colour by applying green paint. Some time later, the production was informed that a local farmer's prize ram had died and that when the animal had been cut open a large amount of green paint had been found inside. Concluding that the ram had been poisoned, the production apologised and compensated the farmer, and production manager Norman Foster gave the farmer's wife a bunch of flowers.

The Tiger Moth glides under the bridge. This flying code violation led to a failed prosecution of pilot Joan Hughes and the production manager.

The fictional M104 motorway was represented by the M40, unfinished at the time. The Tiger Moth's near-miss with the bridge was filmed between Junctions 4 and 5 at Lane End on the High Wycombe Bypass. Before the sequence was filmed, the Ministry of Transport (MOT) and local police told the crew that for the stunt to be performed legally, the plane's wheels had to stay in contact with the road as it went under the bridge. During one of the takes, a crosswind sprang up, causing the dummies to create drag. Hughes feared losing control if the plane connected with the motorway, so remained in the air, clearing the bridge by nine feet (2.7 m) as originally planned. During another take, the continuing crosswind forced her to perform another glide, angering the MOT official who was supervising the shoot and leading to the arrests of Hughes and Foster.

Hughes was charged with seven counts of dangerous flying and Foster with three of aiding and abetting. Their trial did not take place until March 1968, by which time production had ended. Following a two-day hearing at Aylesbury Crown Court, during which the jury viewed the finished film, the defendants were found not guilty. Commenting on his acquittal, which was reported in the Daily Express with the headline "Under The Bridge Goes Lady Penelope", Foster said that the incident had "opened the way for much greater realism in filmmaking." Hughes remarked that until working on Thunderbird 6, she had never felt afraid during her flying career.

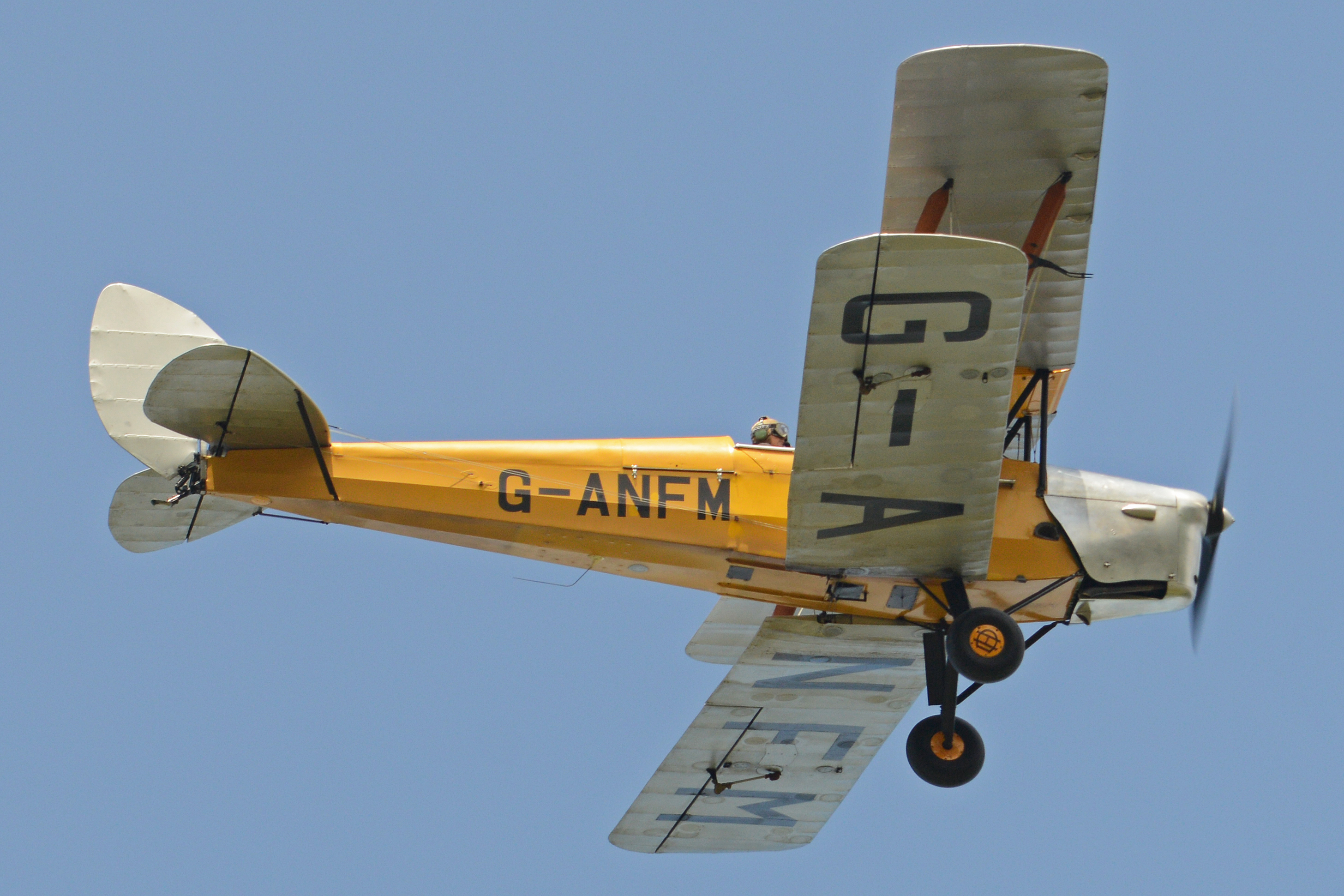
The Tiger Moth in 2017

In the time it took for Hughes and Foster's case to reach court, the MOT withdrew its permission for any more stunts to be filmed on the M40. The remaining Tiger Moth sequences were filmed using radio-controlled planes on a 1/6-scale replica section of motorway. The planes, which were unreliable and frequently crashed, included a version that was six feet (1.8 m) wide as well as a smaller 1/3-scale model for shots featuring the puppet characters. To reduce lighting discrepancies, the motorway model was set up outdoors, with the bridge erected against a backdrop of real trees and fields to simulate the intended setting as accurately as possible. Due to poor weather, the outdoor filming took six weeks to complete.

Built at Hatfield Aerodrome in 1940, the DH82A Tiger Moth that appears in the film (registration G-ANFM, serial number 83604) served in the RAF before being sold to the Association of British Aero Clubs in 1953. After Thunderbird 6, the plane appeared in other films including Agatha (1978). Damaged in a crash in 1992, the repaired Tiger Moth is now a part of the Diamond Nine aerobatics squadron based at White Waltham Airfield.

=== Music ===
The score was recorded between 1 and 5 February 1968 at Olympic Studios with a 56-member orchestra. The opening credits music, which Archer and Hearn describe as "jaunty", plays over shots of Skyship One as it sits on the tarmac at NWAC headquarters. The aerial shots of Alan and Tin-Tin's flight to England are accompanied by a rendition of the 19th-century song "The Daring Young Man on the Flying Trapeze". For this sequence, Lane wanted the plane's movements to suggest a "dance" in mid-air, and during the location shoot had the song played on loudspeakers to inspire the stunt pilot.

Composer Barry Gray preferred his score for Thunderbird 6 to that of Thunderbirds Are Go as the second film's premise of circumnavigation gave him scope to devise a variety of themes. The soundtrack was commercially released as a limited-edition CD in 2005.

Thunderbird 6

Soundtrack album by Barry Gray
- Released: 1 May 2005
- Length: 37:09
- Label: MGM

No.	Title	Length
1.	"What is it to Be? / Main Title"	3:19
2.	"Tiger Moth / Operation Escort / Murder of the Crew"	4:55
3.	"Ballroom Jazz"	4:14
4.	"Welcome Aboard / Breakfast over N.Y. / Brains Destroys Prototype No. 1"	3:06
5.	"Grand Canyon to Melbourne / Brains Destroys Prototype No. 2"	2:51
6.	"Indian Street Music"	2:31
7.	"Dinner Aboard Skyship 1"	3:24
8.	"A Visit to Egypt / Calling Switzerland / Whistle Stop Inn"	4:50
9.	"Parker Inspects Skyship / Thunderbirds Are Go! / TB2 Unloads Tiger Moth"	2:22
10.	"Shaky Departure / Skyship 1 Crashes / On Final Approach"	3:21
11.	"Grounded at Last / Finale"	2:16

Thunderbirds Are Go!/Thunderbird 6

Soundtrack album by Barry Gray
- Released: 15 August 2014
- Length: 38:54
- Label: La-La Land Records

No.	Title	Length
1.	"Plans to Build a Skyship and Thunderbird 6 Main Titles"	3:29
2.	"Flight of the Tiger Moth"	3:36
3.	"Operation Escort"	1:56
4.	"The Ballroom Jazz"	4:18
5.	"Welcome Aboard / Dumping Bodies"	2:45
6.	"Skyship Journey–Grand Canyon to Melbourne"	2:57
7.	"Indian Street Music"	2:44
8.	"Dinner Aboard Skyship 1"	3:24
9.	"Skyship Journey–Egypt to Switzerland and The Whistle Stop Inn"	4:30
10.	"Thunderbirds Are Go / The Trap / Tower Collision"	2:52
11.	"Tiger Moth Escape"	2:46
12.	"Crash Landing and Conclusion"	3:37

== Release and reception ==
Completed in December 1967, Thunderbird 6 was certified U by the British Board of Film Censors on 22 January 1968 but did not go on general release until six months later. It had its premiere at the Odeon Leicester Square on 29 July. Chris Bentley suggests that UA deliberately postponed the film because the poor performance of Thunderbirds Are Go and the cancellation of the TV series had caused it to lose faith in the Thunderbirds brand. To promote the film, Lady Penelope impersonator Penny Snow toured the country in a life-sized replica of FAB 1.

=== Critical response ===
A metaphor for Thunderbirds' decline may be found in the fact that in the very first episode, we see a supersonic atomic aircraft hurtling along a runway, and in the final outing for International Rescue, we watch a biplane chugging along a motorway.

— Stephen La Rivière (2009)

Thunderbird 6 was a critical and box office failure. Its poor reception put an end to plans for another sequel. In a contemporary review for the Daily Mail, critic Barry Norman described Thunderbird 6 as a showcase of "technical excellence" but also noted its "class-conscious" side, pointing out that manservant Parker is the butt of several jokes in the film.

Stephen La Rivière attributes the film's failure to a loss of public interest in Thunderbirds: by the time the film was released, the TV series had been cancelled and the final episode ("Give or Take a Million") had been broadcast over a year earlier. He praises the film's visuals, writing that the Tiger Moth effects were "some of the best effects work Century 21 would ever create. It is a testament to their skill and ingenuity that, in the motorway sequence, the model shots are indistinguishable from the original." He questions the lack of action sequences, suggesting that this disappointed younger viewers and made the film "[feel] like an extended puppet version of holiday magazine programme Wish You Were Here...?" He argues that this "unfamiliar air" to the film is compounded by its voice acting, which he believes sounds more mature than before. He connects this to the casting of new actors like Gary Files and Keith Alexander.

The second Thunderbirds movie is not that different from the original 1966 offering—bald bad guy the Hood's up to no good, lots of stuff gets blown up, the Tracy brothers scramble to save the world and, yet again, we don't get to see anywhere near enough of the very cool Thunderbird 2.

— Film4 review

La Rivière also argues that only an adult audience would have appreciated making the star vehicle a vintage plane, as well as Virgil's pun on Esso's slogan "Put a Tiger in Your Tank". Meanwhile, child viewers "had spent the entire 90 minutes eagerly waiting for the most fantastic piece of hardware to arrive. They got an old plane." Commentator John Marriott also criticises the Tiger Moth, remarking that "the big screen was an unsuitable place for the gentle irony of steam-age technology scoring triumphantly over an array of fantasy machines." Responding to claims that the tone is markedly different from that of Thunderbirds Are Go, Gerry Anderson said that because months had passed since the last TV episode, Century 21 was "much more aware with [Thunderbird 6] that it wasn't just a question of making a longer episode, but it was, indeed, to make something special for the cinema."

John Peel is dismissive of the film, negatively comparing it to the "well-made fun" of Thunderbirds Are Go. He calls it "a feeble last fling for a brilliant series" with an over-long and illogical plot, weak jokes and not enough action. BBC Online gives the film three stars out of five, calling it a "weak and perhaps too padded adventure" whose plot has the "extended feel of a special TV episode" instead of a feature film. Jim Schembri of The Age praises the story and describes the film as having a "snappier pace, with an action climax leaps ahead of anything in the latest Bond epic." Writing for the same newspaper, Philippa Hawker believes the film to be more humorous than its precursor, calling it "more self-consciously light-hearted, but [...] also more suspenseful" than Thunderbirds Are Go. The Film4 website gives three out of five, praising Century 21's decision to introduce more realistically proportioned puppets. It favourably compares the film to the 2004 live-action adaptation. The review describes the film as "entertaining if antiquated" and "a slice of kid-friendly cinema made for a far more innocent age."

== Home video ==
Thunderbird 6 was first released on DVD in Regions 2 and 4 by MGM in 2001. Special features included an audio commentary by Sylvia Anderson and director David Lane. In 2004, an "International Rescue Edition", released both separately and as a box set with Thunderbirds Are Go, went on sale in Regions 1, 2 and 4 with additional special features including three making-of documentaries. In 2014, Twilight Time, through their sub-licensing deal with MGM, released Thunderbird 6 on Blu-ray as a double feature set with Thunderbirds Are Go. This was limited to 3,000 copies and available only through the Screen Archives Entertainment website. The set was re-released by Kino Lorber in 2017.

== See also ==
- 1968 in film
- List of films featuring space stations
- List of films set in the future
- List of puppet films
