= Thunderbirds Are Go =

1966 British film directed by David Lane

- UK film poster
- Directed by: David Lane
- Screenplay by: Gerry & Sylvia Anderson
- Based on: Thunderbirds by Gerry & Sylvia Anderson
- Produced by: Sylvia Anderson
- Starring: Sylvia Anderson; Ray Barrett; Alexander Davion; Peter Dyneley; Christine Finn; David Graham; Paul Maxwell; Neil McCallum; Bob Monkhouse; Shane Rimmer; Charles Tingwell; Jeremy Wilkin; Matt Zimmerman
- Cinematography: Paddy Seale
- Edited by: Len Walter
- Music by: Barry Gray
- Production companies: Century 21 Cinema Productions; Associated Television
- Distributed by: United Artists
- Release date: 12 December 1966
- Running time: 93 minutes
- Country: United Kingdom
- Language: English
- Budget: £250,000

Thunderbirds Are Go is a 1966 British science fiction puppet film based on Thunderbirds, a Supermarionation television series created by Gerry and Sylvia Anderson. Written by the Andersons and directed by David Lane, the film follows the spacecraft Zero-X as it carries the first human mission to Mars. When Zero-X suffers a malfunction during re-entry, it is up to life-saving organisation International Rescue, with the help of its technologically advanced Thunderbird machines, to activate the trapped crew's escape pod before the spacecraft hits the ground.

Filmed between March and June 1966 at AP Films's (APF) studios on the Slough Trading Estate, and on location in Portugal, Thunderbirds Are Go features guest appearances by puppet versions of Cliff Richard and The Shadows, who also contributed to the film's score. It was the first film to be shot using an early form of video assist called "Add-a-Vision". The special effects sequences, directed by Derek Meddings, took six months to complete.

Although early reviews praised the film as a successful cinematic transfer of the TV series, box office reaction was muted and the film proved to be a commercial failure. Later reviews criticised the film for its lack of characterisation, time-consuming effects shots, and inclusion of a dream sequence involving Richard and The Shadows. Surprised by the film's failure, and confident that Thunderbirds still had cinematic potential, distributors United Artists ordered a sequel: Thunderbird 6. This too received a lukewarm critical and commercial response and plans for further sequels were abandoned. Zero-X later appeared in the first episode of Captain Scarlet and the Mysterons, the Andersons' follow-up to Thunderbirds. TV Century 21 magazine ran a Zero-X comic strip until 1969.

== Plot ==
In 2065, the first human mission to Mars is launched from Glenn Field in the form of spacecraft Zero-X. Unknown to Captain Travers and his four-man crew, master criminal the Hood has stowed away on board to photograph Zero-X's wing mechanism. Shortly after lift-off, the Hood inadvertently traps his foot in the craft's hydraulics, jamming them and causing Zero-X to go out of control. As the astronauts eject in the escape pod, the Hood extracts his crushed foot and parachutes to safety. Zero-X crashes into the ocean and explodes.

In 2067, (Note: Although Jeff is shown to be reading a newspaper dated June 2066, the Andersons intended this part of the film to be set in 2067 (Bentley 2008, p. 303).) the Inquiry Board of the Space Exploration Center concludes that the mission was sabotaged. A second Zero-X has been built and another mission to Mars planned. Due to the possibility of further sabotage, International Rescue agrees to provide security at the launch. Jeff Tracy dispatches Scott to Glenn Field in Thunderbird 1 to monitor the situation from the ground, while Virgil and Alan are assigned to escort Zero-X through the atmosphere in Thunderbirds 2 and 3. Posing as a reporter at the pre-launch press conference, Lady Penelope arranges for each member of the crew to wear a St Christopher medallion containing a homing device. On launch day, Dr Grant's device is no longer registering, despite the fact that he is aboard Zero-X awaiting lift-off. Scott unmasks "Grant" as the Hood in disguise. The Hood flees Glenn Field in a car, pursued by Penelope and Parker in FAB 1. Reaching the coast, he transfers to a speedboat and then a helicopter. Parker shoots down the helicopter using FAB 1's machine gun. (Note: Surviving the helicopter crash, the Hood returns in the sequel, Thunderbird 6, as the villain Black Phantom (Bentley 2005, p. 98). In her audio commentary for the DVD release of Thunderbird 6, Sylvia Anderson said that Black Phantom is the Hood's son, seeking revenge for his father's death.) The kidnapped Grant is found and returned to Zero-X and the spacecraft launches without further incident.

Mission complete, Penelope invites Scott and Virgil to join her at a popular nightclub called The Swinging Star. Returning to Tracy Island, Alan feels unappreciated when Jeff insists that he stay at base while the others spend the night partying. Asleep in bed, Alan has a surreal dream in which he and Penelope travel to another Swinging Star located in space. Appearing at the nightclub are Cliff Richard Jr and The Shadows, who perform a song called "Shooting Star" and an instrumental called "Lady Penelope". The dream ends when Alan falls back to Earth, waking to discover that he has fallen out of bed.

After six weeks in space, Zero-X reaches Mars on 22 July. While Navigator Newman remains in orbit, the rest of the crew detach their rover – the Martian Excursion Vehicle (MEV) – from the main body of the craft, and touch down on the planet's surface. They are puzzled to find the terrain dotted with coil-like rock formations. Captain Martin blows up one of them with the MEV's gun and Dr Pierce prepares to go outside to collect samples. The other formations come to life, revealing themselves to be one-eyed rock snakes. The aliens bombard the MEV with fireballs from their mouths, forcing the astronauts to abandon the excursion and re-enter orbit. They dock with Zero-X and start back to Earth.

As Zero-X re-enters Earth's atmosphere on 2 September, one of the lifting bodies fails to connect with the spacecraft due to a radio fault. The impact damages various systems, including flight control and the escape pod circuit. With the astronauts unable to eject and Zero-X set to impact the town of Craigsville, Florida, (Note: Craigsville is located in Florida (Archer and Nicholls, p. 116; Archer and Hearn, p. 140) and background shots filmed in Portugal are intended to represent that area.) Jeff dispatches Scott and Brains in Thunderbird 1 and Virgil, Alan and Gordon in Thunderbird 2. While Craigsville is evacuated, Alan is lifted into Zero-X's undercarriage and repairs the escape circuit under Brains' guidance. Seconds before impact, Alan completes his task and jumps out as the astronauts eject. The empty Zero-X hits Craigsville and obliterates the town. Picked up by Penelope and Parker in FAB 1, Alan is driven to the real Swinging Star, where the entire International Rescue team toasts him as the "hero of the day."

== Voice cast ==
Voice actor	Major characters voiced
Peter Dyneley	Jeff Tracy
Shane Rimmer	Scott Tracy
Jeremy Wilkin	Virgil Tracy, Space Colonel Harris
Matt Zimmerman	Alan Tracy
David Graham	Gordon Tracy, Brains, Parker
Ray Barrett	John Tracy, the Hood, Commander Casey
Sylvia Anderson	Lady Penelope
Christine Finn	Tin-Tin Kyrano
Paul Maxwell	Captain Paul Travers
Alexander Davion	Space Greg Captain Martin
Bob Monkhouse	Navigator Brad Newman
Neil McCallum	Dr Ray Pierce
Charles Tingwell	Dr Tony Grant
Cliff Richard	Cliff Richard Jr
The Shadows	Themselves

With one exception, Virgil Tracy, the regular characters returning from the TV series were voiced by their original actors. Voice actors introduced in Thunderbirds Are Go were:

- Jeremy Wilkin as Virgil Tracy. David Holliday, the original voice of Virgil, had returned to the United States after the completion of Thunderbirds Series One. Wilkin voiced the character for the rest of the 1960s. He continued his association with the Andersons for several years, going on to voice supporting characters in Captain Scarlet, Joe 90 and The Secret Service, as well as appear in the live-action productions Doppelgänger, UFO and The Protectors.
- Paul Maxwell as Captain Paul Travers. Having been the voice of Colonel Zodiac in Fireball XL5, Maxwell later provided uncredited guest voices in Thunderbirds Series Two, voiced Captain Grey in Captain Scarlet, and appeared in an episode of UFO.
- Alexander Davion as Space Captain Greg Martin. Davion later appeared in an episode of UFO.
- Bob Monkhouse as Navigator Brad Newman. The role of Newman originally went to Alfred Marks, who withdrew from the production due to a dispute over his fee. Monkhouse had approached Gerry Anderson to obtain permission to film a sketch parody of Stingray but ended up agreeing to replace Marks. Monkhouse recalled the conversation: "[Anderson] said, 'How much would you charge for the job?' I said, 'Gerry, I'd do it for nothing.' And that was the first time I ever heard the phrase, 'the price is right'." He used an American accent for the film.
- Neil McCallum as Dr Ray Pierce. McCallum's later credits include appearances in Captain Scarlet, UFO and The Protectors.
- Charles Tingwell as Dr Tony Grant. Known for playing Alan Dawson in the medical drama Emergency Ward 10, Tingwell was approached by the Andersons after being recommended by Ray Barrett. Like Maxwell, he voiced guest characters in Thunderbirds Series Two and Captain Scarlet and had a guest role on UFO.
- Cliff Richard as Cliff Richard Jr. Cast in Portugal, where he owned a house "next-door-but-one" to the Andersons, Richard was "thrilled" to be involved in the film, in which he and The Shadows perform "Shooting Star" during the dream sequence. He fondly remembered his puppet self: "It was quite a hoot ... I was never really sure if I looked like my puppet or it looked like me."
- Shadows members Brian Bennett, Hank Marvin, John Rostill and Bruce Welch were also depicted in puppet form and supplied backing vocals for Richard.

== Production ==
I tried to keep the stories believable, if only for that particular moment. Of all the planets, the only one that might possibly sustain life was Mars, so, with everybody in science fiction wanting to talk about aliens or another race, Mars was the only planet that made any sense.

— Gerry Anderson on the film's premise

When filming on Series One of Thunderbirds end in late 1965, Gerry Anderson and his financial backer, Lew Grade, agreed that a feature film would be the next logical step in expanding the Thunderbirds franchise. With United Artists (UA) contracted to distribute the film, a budget of £250,000 (about £4.23 million in 2025) was set and Anderson and his wife, Sylvia, began work on a script at their second home in Portugal.

In writing the film, the Andersons drew inspiration from the American-Soviet Space Race – in particular, the aim to land the first astronauts on the Moon – but adapted this premise for the futuristic world of Thunderbirds by switching the location to Mars. During the pre-production of their next puppet series, Captain Scarlet and the Mysterons, they wrote in an appearance of Zero-X's MEV as a link to Thunderbirds. Like Thunderbirds Are Go, Captain Scarlet depicts hostile life on Mars, although the Mysterons of that series pose a greater threat than the film's "rock snakes" in that they strike at Earth itself. The rescue of Zero-X is similar to that of Fireflash in the episode "Operation Crash-Dive".

Frustrated with the puppets' limitations and worried that the TV series would not translate well to the big screen, Alan Pattillo declined to direct the film. The role was instead given to 24-year-old David Lane, who had directed several of the TV episodes. This made Lane the UK's youngest film director at the time.

The idea of a dream sequence at The Swinging Star was spearheaded by Sylvia, who expanded these scenes by adding in a musical interlude performed by puppet versions of Cliff Richard and The Shadows. Richard and Shadows band member Bruce Welch both owned homes in Portugal near the Andersons, and it was there that the two agreed to "appear" in the film as Supermarionation puppets. Agreeing to contribute to the film's score, Richard and The Shadows recorded a song titled "Shooting Star" and an instrumental titled "Lady Penelope". Sylvia acknowledged that the dream sequence does not advance the plot, noting in her autobiography that it was "sheer indulgence that would not have been possible on our television budget." Stephen La Rivière considers the sequence to be the strangest ever created for an Anderson production.

=== Filming ===
The advantages were great. All members of the unit could now study the set-up and watch rehearsals without having to move the camera operator, saving a lot of his time because he could then concentrate on his job without continual interruption from the director, continuity girl, art director and other technicians wanting to look through the camera.

— Gerry Anderson on the benefits of Add-a-Vision

Pre-production took three months and a 16-week shooting schedule was drawn up to coincide with the filming of Thunderbirds Series Two. Principal photography began on 3 March 1966 and ended in late June. The staff of APF, the Andersons' production company, were divided into "A" and "B" units: A to shoot the film, B the TV episodes. To accommodate its increased workload, APF bought two additional buildings on the Slough Trading Estate, combining these with the pre-existing puppet workshop, art department building and publicity office to create a production base of five buildings. Converted by January 1966, one of these former factory units contained puppet stages while the other incorporated a single large sound stage on which all of the film's model and effects work would be completed.

Thunderbirds Are Go was filmed in Techniscope with a 2.35:1 widescreen aspect ratio. The possibility of using anamorphic lenses was rejected as depth of field problems made them unsuitable for the effects shots. Techniscope, on the other hand, used spherical lenses but still produced a cinematic "letterbox" image. All APF productions up to this point had been filmed on Arriflex cameras, but for the film these were replaced with Mitchells.

The film was the first to be shot using a video assist technology called the Livingston Electronic Viewfinder Unit. Also known as "Add-a-Vision", this system comprised a viewfinder that relayed images from the shooting camera to video monitors around the studio. This allowed the crew to view newly filmed footage live on set and in better quality than before. Add-a-Vision also helped the puppet operators, who were stationed on gantries several feet above the studio floor and could not easily follow the puppets' movements. The system also incorporated a playback function for viewing rushes. Based on German video assist technology, Add-A-Vision was developed by Thunderbirds director of photography John Read in collaboration with Prowest Electronics.

To improve the look of the puppets, director David Lane often kept tops of heads and control wires out of shot and incorporated low-angle shots for dramatic effect. The background shots for Alan's rescue of the astronauts were originally filmed on location in Portugal; these were deemed unsatisfactory and replaced with a backdrop painted by Reg Hill. The location shoot also included filming a spiralling point-of-view shot for the end of Alan's dream in which he plunges back down to Tracy Island. To achieve this, the crew took a helicopter to an altitude of 5,000 feet (1,500 m) above an island off the Portuguese coast, then the pilot let the aircraft "autogyro" downward while cameraman Alan Perry filmed the island looming up from below. This was also found wanting and was replaced with footage of a studio-built miniature model.

==== Puppet design ====
The Shadows perform the song "Shooting Star" on top of FAB 1 as part of Alan's dream.

Promising Television Mail that Thunderbirds Are Go would be "bigger and better than anything we have ever done before", Gerry Anderson realised that any design flaws that showed up on a cinema screen would not be forgiven as quickly as those on TV. Therefore, the puppets were expertly revamped, with new paint, wigs and costumes. Models and sets were rebuilt from scratch with greater attention to detail. Over the course of the production, APF's puppet wardrobe swelled to more than 700 costumes, with 150 extra costumes made as spares.

Some of the established characters, including Scott Tracy, were re-sculpted from the original puppets, while guest characters, such as the Zero-X crew, were entirely new creations. The guest character puppets of the TV series had Plasticine faces that were remodelled for each appearance. This approach was largely abandoned for the film: as some of the puppets would be playing real-life celebrities, a decision was made to build most of the guest cast in fibreglass to the same standards of workmanship as the main characters. Like Scott Tracy, the face of Captain Travers was modelled on Sean Connery.

The film puppets had the same caricatured proportions as their TV predecessors, the heads being disproportionately large compared to the limbs and torsos. As filming progressed, APF developed a prototype puppet with an animatronic mouth to produce more realistic lip and jaw movement. However, the results proved unsatisfactory and the idea was abandoned. For its next TV series, Captain Scarlet, APF would introduce a brand-new puppet design that used realistic body proportions, made possible by moving the internal lip-sync mechanism from the head to the chest. The puppets of the sequel film Thunderbird 6 were designed as a compromise between the two generations, with increased realism and less overt caricature.

==== Set design and special effects ====
I had to insist on just tangerine and black, continually assuring [the art department] that it would look effective. As a producer, I was entitled to do it my way and, although I do not think Bob [Bell] ever really approved, I stuck to my concept.

— Sylvia Anderson on the conference room design

Art department directors Bob Bell and Keith Wilson divided their efforts, Wilson working on Series Two while Bell concentrated on the film. Bell's sets for the film included the Glenn Field Control Tower and news conference room, the Swinging Star interiors, and re-designed versions of various locations on Tracy Island. The design of the Space Exploration Center conference room was heavily influenced by producer Sylvia Anderson, who insisted on a tangerine and black colour scheme in vivid contrast with the blue uniforms of the SEC officials. Filming of the conference room scene involved the simultaneous operation of 20 puppets, a feat that APF could not have achieved on a TV budget.

Lane said of the design: "Thunderbirds Are Go was done like an episode but on a bigger scale. Whereas we would think that it might be nice to do a particular shot on the series but couldn't afford to, with Thunderbirds Are Go we just did it because we had the money." Background characters at the Swinging Star were represented by enlarged black-and-white photographs. Anderson compared the dream sequence to a "Busby Berkeley sequence" on account of its surrealism, aspects of which included a giant guitar and pink "space clouds" made using dry ice. She believed that the portrayal of real-life singers in puppet form helped the film's promotion.

The seven-foot (2.1 m) model of Zero-X, as seen in the launch sequence at the start of the film. Note the widescreen aspect ratio.

Derek Meddings and his team of 28 technicians filmed the special effects shots over six months. Their major projects were the Zero-X launch sequences, a new launch sequence for each of the Thunderbird machines, the car chase between FAB 1 and the Hood, the Swinging Star scenes, the sequences set on the Martian surface, and the destruction of Zero-X. Over 300 of the effects used scale models. The crew took advantage of the ample space inside the new effects building to experiment with low-angle shots and other more inventive camera angles. Building new models of the Thunderbird machines was especially problematic in the case of Thunderbird 2, as Meddings explained: "Unfortunately, its replacement was not only the wrong colour, it was a completely different shape. Although we had several more built in different scales, I never felt our model makers managed to re-capture the look of the original."

The Zero-X spacecraft, designed by Meddings, was built as a seven-foot-long (2.1 m), 50-pound (23 kg) fibreglass model at a cost of £2,500 (approximately £40,700 in 2025). Although the model took months to build, all its shots were completed in two days. The cockpit was based on that of Concorde, a prototype of which was under construction at Filton Airfield. A long shot of the Zero-X lifting body exploding in Earth's atmosphere was the only effects work that was filmed outdoors. This shot was mounted on a gantry at a nearby power station against the real sky, with Cordtex explosive strips, gunpowder, naphtha, magnesium and petroleum gel used to create a "fireball" effect. The film's effects later became so well known in the industry that the crew of James Cameron's Aliens (1986) used them for reference.

=== Post-production ===
A shot from one of the deleted scenes, in which Alan and Brains direct Jeff's televised speech.

Post-production was completed in the autumn to allow the film to be released in time for Christmas. The film was edited by Len Walter, who had previously worked on the TV series.

The workprint exceeded UA's maximum permitted running time by about 15 minutes, forcing Walter to cut several scenes that were inessential to the plot. Some of the deleted scenes concerned the SEC's attempts to persuade International Rescue to escort Zero-X. Another scene showed the Hood telepathically contacting his half-brother Kyrano (voiced by David Graham), Jeff's retainer on Tracy Island, and forcing him to reveal International Rescue's intentions. With the removal of the latter scene, Kyrano was completely cut from the film. Other scenes saw Penelope and Parker flying to Glenn Field aboard hypersonic airliner Fireflash and Jeff Tracy making a speech to the world via the Trans American TV Network.

The deleted scenes are now considered lost, with only photographs and brief footage surviving. One of the photographs, showing Brains and Alan standing behind a TV camera as Jeff prepares to make his speech, appeared as the cover of issue 35 of FAB magazine. Another shows the Hood standing in his jungle temple next to a clapperboard. Footage from the Trans American sequence was later edited into the Joe 90 episode "International Concerto".

Composer Barry Gray recorded the score in six sessions from 9 to 11 October at Anvil Studios. The music was performed by a 70-piece orchestra supplemented by Gray's own electronic effects. The closing credits are accompanied by footage of the Royal Marines Band Service (RMBS) performing the "Thunderbirds March"; this was filmed in a single morning at the Royal Marines School of Music in Deal, with Lieutenant Colonel Vivian Dunn conducting the marines. Three weeks were allotted for visual wrap-up work, minor animation, sound editing, dubbing and creating the opening titles. The film was submitted to the British Board of Film Censors in November and given a U certificate.

The film's animated opening titles present the main puppet cast and are accompanied by a re-recorded version of the "Thunderbirds March". The closing credits include a number of self-referential acknowledgements to individuals and companies alleged to have contributed to the production, such as SEC chairman Space Colonel Harris, Glenn Field's Commander Casey and APF's "Space Location Unit". The credits end with the humorous disclaimer: "None of the characters appearing in this photoplay intentionally resemble any persons living or dead ... since they do not yet exist!"

== Release and reception ==
Everybody cheered and I remember leaving the cinema and the manager said, "You get a picture like this and they start queuing up at four o'clock in the morning." [...] The head of United Artists said to me, "I don't know whether it's going to make more money than Bond or not, I can't decide" [...] The next day, the Dominion at Tottenham Court Road had about ten people in it.

— Gerry Anderson on the film's premiere and the early response from the public

By December 1966, Lew Grade had failed in his bid to sell Thunderbirds to an American TV network. He instructed Gerry Anderson to cap Series Two at six episodes and devise a new series. Around this time, APF was rebranded "Century 21 Productions"; the new name was first carried by Thunderbirds Are Go to link the film to APF's weekly comic TV Century 21. The film was the first Anderson project to be promoted, in full, as a "Gerry Anderson Century 21 Production".

After a well-received test screening for UA executives, Thunderbirds Are Go premiered at the London Pavilion cinema on 12 December. The premiere was held in aid of Barnardo's and the RMBS performed the "Thunderbirds March" both before and after the screening.

=== Critical response ===
The film's December 1966 release came amid what commentators dubbed the "Thunderbirds Christmas" – a rush among retailers to sell Thunderbirds toys, games, books and other tie-ins. An early review in Kinematograph Weekly described the film as a "colourful extension" of the TV series, while the News of the World praised its "breathtaking entertainment". The Sunday Express was also positive, calling the concept of a Mars mission "awesome" and commending the film's visuals: "Of course, the cast are all puppets, the sets, models, and the story unabashed nonsense. But it's great all the same." Elsewhere, the Daily Mail praised the puppets' big-screen transition: "So who needs people? These handsome, stiff-necked, shiny-faced Thunderbirds puppets have broken spectacularly out of black-and-white TV and on to the cinema screen."

Everything about Thunderbirds Are Go is visibly a technological progression from the TV programmes; the whole production looks more polished. The visual effects became more impressive [...] The puppetry also developed [...] Now movement was more subtle and realistic, less puppet-like [...] The set design had also matured [...] All sets were now comparable with the slickest designs in live-action.

— Stephen La Rivière (2009)

As the Andersons began a nationwide promotional tour, it became clear that the film had little interest from the public and the box office returns were poor. According to Gerry Anderson: "When we got off the plane at the first destination we were told that the film was in trouble. Cinemas were apparently half-full. When we got to the next big city we got more news that made us even more depressed – box office figures were inexplicably low wherever we went." He believed that Thunderbirds' origins as a TV series weakened the film's chances of success: "The only thing we could think was that at that time the audience was not used to seeing a feature film version of a television show. So people would see Thunderbirds and think, 'We've seen it on television.'" Sylvia Anderson had a similar explanation: "Although we still had our loyal television fans, they remained just that – firmly seated in front of their television screens and not in the cinema."

Stephen La Rivière argues that Thunderbirds Are Go also faced strong competition from other family films including Batman and Born Free, as well as re-issues of The Wizard of Oz (1939), Mary Poppins (1964) and The Sound of Music (1965). Later reviews were more critical: while the Slough Observer described the film as "basically a Technicolor large-screen extension" of the TV series, The Times was negative, arguing that the TV-style storytelling and characterisation were too thin to sustain a feature film and that the frequent launch sequences were more for padding than visual appeal.

Alan's subplot lends the film psychedelic colour and a welcome dose of human drama, but mostly, Thunderbirds Are Go is about the hardware [...] Anderson and SFX designer Derek Meddings make the most of this cinema version's extra scope, filling the screen with bigger, shinier craft, while director Lane has more time to linger on the intricate detailing of the phallic models before they're blown to smithereens in the film's explosive action sequences. For the techno-fetishist, it's positively hardcore.

— Film4 review

John Peel comments that Thunderbirds Are Go is "well-made" and keeps its promise to deliver visual spectacle. He considers it superior to the sequel, Thunderbird 6, but suggests that its plot is partly recycled from the TV episodes and describes the dream sequence as "painfully silly". Both La Rivière and Peel also believe that the Thunderbird machines are underused. La Rivière suggests that the lengthy model shots and reduced role of the Tracy family may have disappointed the child target audience.

Jeff Stafford of Turner Classic Movies regards the film in its entirety as a "pop culture novelty as fascinating and endearing as a toy from one's childhood." He states that the effects sequences are protracted: "You'll feel yourself growing older as cranes and hydraulic lifts slowly – very slowly – prepare for a missile launch." William Gallagher of BBC Online gives a positive review, calling Thunderbirds Are Go "every bit as good" as the TV series. However, he also suggests that Thunderbirds worked better on TV, remarking that "certainly there's no greater profundity or universal theme to the film; it is just an extended episode." He rates Thunderbirds Are Go three stars out of five, as does the Film4 website.

The film has a 50% approval rating on Rotten Tomatoes.

=== Sequel ===
Dismissing the film's failure as bad luck, UA told Anderson to make a sequel. According to Anderson: "None of us ... could understand why the film hadn't succeeded, so it was decided we would make another one." Thunderbird 6 was deliberately written to be a more light-hearted adventure. However, critical and commercial response was no better than before, putting an end to Thunderbirds as a media franchise until the release of the live-action Thunderbirds in 2004.

== Other media ==
=== Books and comics ===
A novelisation by Angus P. Allan was released by Armada Books in 1966. In addition, TV Century 21 published a four-part "photographic picturisation" of the film narrating it from the perspective of the Zero-X crew. After this, the comic published Zero-X strips until 1969. These told the continuing adventures of the astronauts, once again led by Captain Travers, as they explored the rest of the Solar System and beyond aboard the "Mark III" Zero-X.

Between June and September 1967, the comic linked Thunderbirds Are Go to Captain Scarlet. These issues showed a follow-up expedition to Mars, led by Captain Black of the Spectrum security organisation, ending in disaster when Black (as shown in the first episode of Captain Scarlet) falls under Mysteron control. Zero-X returns to Earth and lands at Glenn Field, where the possessed Black avoids capture by the authorities.

=== Soundtrack and home video ===
A re-recorded version of the score was released on vinyl by UA in 1967 and Silva Screen Records in 1987. It was subsequently released on CD in 1990 with a re-release by EMI two years later. In 2014, the original soundtrack recordings for Thunderbirds are Go and Thunderbird 6 were released by La-La Land Records as a limited-edition CD.

Thunderbirds Are Go was first released on DVD in 2001, in Regions 2 and 4, by MGM. In 2004, an "International Rescue Edition" was released; this was also available in Region 1 and was marketed both separately and as a box set with Thunderbird 6. In 2014, Twilight Time (through its sub-licensing deal with MGM) released both films as a double feature Blu-ray set, limited to 3,000 copies and available only from the Screen Archives Entertainment website. This set was re-released by Kino Lorber in 2017.

== See also ==
- List of puppet films
- List of films set in the future
- List of films set on Mars
- List of films featuring space stations
- List of films featuring extraterrestrials
