= Lady Penelope =

- Thunderbirds character
- The original puppet character
- First appearance: "Trapped in the Sky" (30 September 1965)
- Created by: Gerry and Sylvia Anderson
- Based on: Sylvia Anderson
- Designed by: Mary Turner (puppet sculptor)
- Portrayed by: Sophia Myles (2004 film)
- Voiced by: Sylvia Anderson (1960s series and films); Rosamund Pike (remake series); Genevieve Gaunt (2021 audio series)

In-universe information
- Nickname: Penny
- Occupation: International Rescue's London Agent; Model and socialite
- Family: Lord Hugh and Lady Amelia Creighton-Ward (parents)
- Home: Creighton-Ward Mansion, Kent

Lady Penelope Creighton-Ward is a fictional character introduced in the British 1960s Supermarionation television series Thunderbirds, which was produced by AP Films for ITC Entertainment. The character also appears in the film sequels Thunderbirds Are Go (1966) and Thunderbird 6 (1968), the 2004 live-action film Thunderbirds and the CGI remake TV series Thunderbirds Are Go. In the world of Thunderbirds, Penelope is employed by the secret organisation International Rescue as its London field agent.

The puppet character of the TV series and first two films was voiced by Sylvia Anderson. In the live-action film, she was portrayed by Sophia Myles, while in the remake series she is voiced by Rosamund Pike.

== Development ==
The original puppet character was devised with transatlantic viewers in mind. In a 2014 interview, Thunderbirds co-creator Sylvia Anderson explained: "I said to myself, 'What do the Americans think of us Brits? They think we're either Cockneys or posh ladies in stately homes. OK, that's what we'll give them.' So you've got Parker, the Cockney chauffeur, and Lady Penelope Creighton-Ward, who lives this glamorous life in her big house."

One of my favourite books was The Scarlet Pimpernel. I was fascinated by the idea that you could be one person by day and someone completely different at night. So I thought about the lady of the manor with her lovely car, doing all her good works. And then I thought there would be someone she would give a second chance to in life; a lovable rogue who could be the driver of her pink Rolls‑Royce. That's how Penelope and Parker evolved.

— Sylvia Anderson on the characterisation

Anderson said that she made Penelope a secret agent as she "loved the idea of an adventurous secret life." She compared Penelope favourably to the women characters of AP Films' earlier puppet series, which in her words "were just there to look good", adding that when the company moved on to Thunderbirds "the role of women was changing, and I knew Lady Penelope had to be up there with the boys." In her autobiography, she said that she wrote the character to convey "not only the daring and panache of a secret agent, but also the poise of a cool and beautiful aristocrat".

Penelope would ultimately be modelled on and voiced by Anderson. The original template for the character was a model in Vogue magazine. However, after a number of test sculptures were rejected, designer Mary Turner instead chose to base the look on Anderson herself (a decision of which Anderson was not immediately apprised). Interviewed by the Daily Mirror in 1968, Turner commented: "We wanted a glamorous blonde and [Anderson] was the obvious choice."

The character's attire was inspired by contemporary Carnaby Street and Parisian fashions, with Vogue and Harper's magazines used as points of reference. Silks, leathers and furs were supplied by London department stores such as Liberty and Dickins & Jones.

According to Anderson, the writers on the series initially had trouble devising substantial plots for the character, prompting her to encourage them to write Penelope into more episodes.

== Original series depiction ==
Lady Penelope is the 26-year-old daughter of aristocrat Lord Hugh Creighton-Ward and his wife, Amelia. The early years of her life were spent at Creighton-Ward Mansion. Later, her father was requested by the government to travel to India to organise a tea-growing community. The Indian climate did not agree with Penelope, so she returned without her parents to England, where she was put into the care of a governess, Miss Pemberton, with whom she quickly bonded.

At the age of eleven, Penelope was sent to the prestigious Roedean School. She excelled in many subjects and became very popular among her peers; she was later elected head girl. Upon leaving Roedean, Penelope attended a finishing school in Switzerland. Here, she became a skilled skier and linguist, being able to speak fluent French, German and Italian.

On the outside, Lady Penelope is just another member of the British high society, as well as a fashion icon. However, after completing her education in Buckinghamshire, she rejected the aristocracy's endless round of social engagements and became a secret agent. It was while working as the chief operative of the Federal Agents Bureau (FAB) that Penelope first met Jeff Tracy, the founder of International Rescue, and immediately accepted his invitation to become International Rescue's field agent in London. In the episode "Vault of Death" it is shown she is not a very good driver.

Penelope is stylish and fashionable in every aspect of her life. She is a world-renowned supermodel and celebrity and has appeared on the cover of Chic magazine. Her clothes are specially created for her by top fashion designers such as Elaine Wickfern and François Lemaire, who named a revolutionary new fabric "Penelon" after her (as seen in "Alias Mr. Hackenbacker"). Whenever Penelope is in Paris, she always drinks Pernod ("The Perils of Penelope"). She takes tea almost religiously and can communicate with International Rescue via her Regency teapot.

=== Appearances ===
- "Trapped in the Sky"
- "The Perils of Penelope"
- "Day of Disaster"
- "30 Minutes After Noon"
- "Vault of Death"
- "The Mighty Atom"
- "The Impostors"
- "The Man from MI.5"
- "Danger at Ocean Deep"
- "The Duchess Assignment"
- "Brink of Disaster"
- "The Cham-Cham"
- "Security Hazard" (in flashback footage)
- "Atlantic Inferno"
- "Path of Destruction"
- "Alias Mr. Hackenbacker"
- "Lord Parker's 'Oliday"
- "Give or Take a Million"
- Thunderbirds Are Go
- Thunderbird 6

=== Retinue ===
Lady Penelope's butler and chauffeur is Aloysius Parker, nicknamed "Nosey". Parker is descended from a long line of Cockney retainers who have served the British aristocracy for centuries. However, finding it difficult to obtain a stable job, Parker fell in with the criminals of the London underworld. He secured a reputation as the world's foremost safe-cracker and cat-burglar, which resulted in his serving a sentence at Parkmoor Scrubs Prison. Following his release, he quickly returned to his criminal ways, and was discovered by Penelope while attempting to crack the safe of an oil tycoon. Penelope had learned of Parker's talents and offered him a partnership in her spy work for International Rescue. He is now a loyal and indispensable assistant to Penelope and International Rescue. "Give or Take a Million" is the only episode of the series in which Penelope appears without Parker.

Lilian (or Lil, as she is known by Parker) is Penelope's cook. She has a sizeable repertoire of dishes, much to Parker's disgust ("Vault of Death"). Perce is the gardener for the 2,000-acre (8.1 km^{2}) Creighton-Ward estate and a friend of Parker.

=== Vehicles and property ===
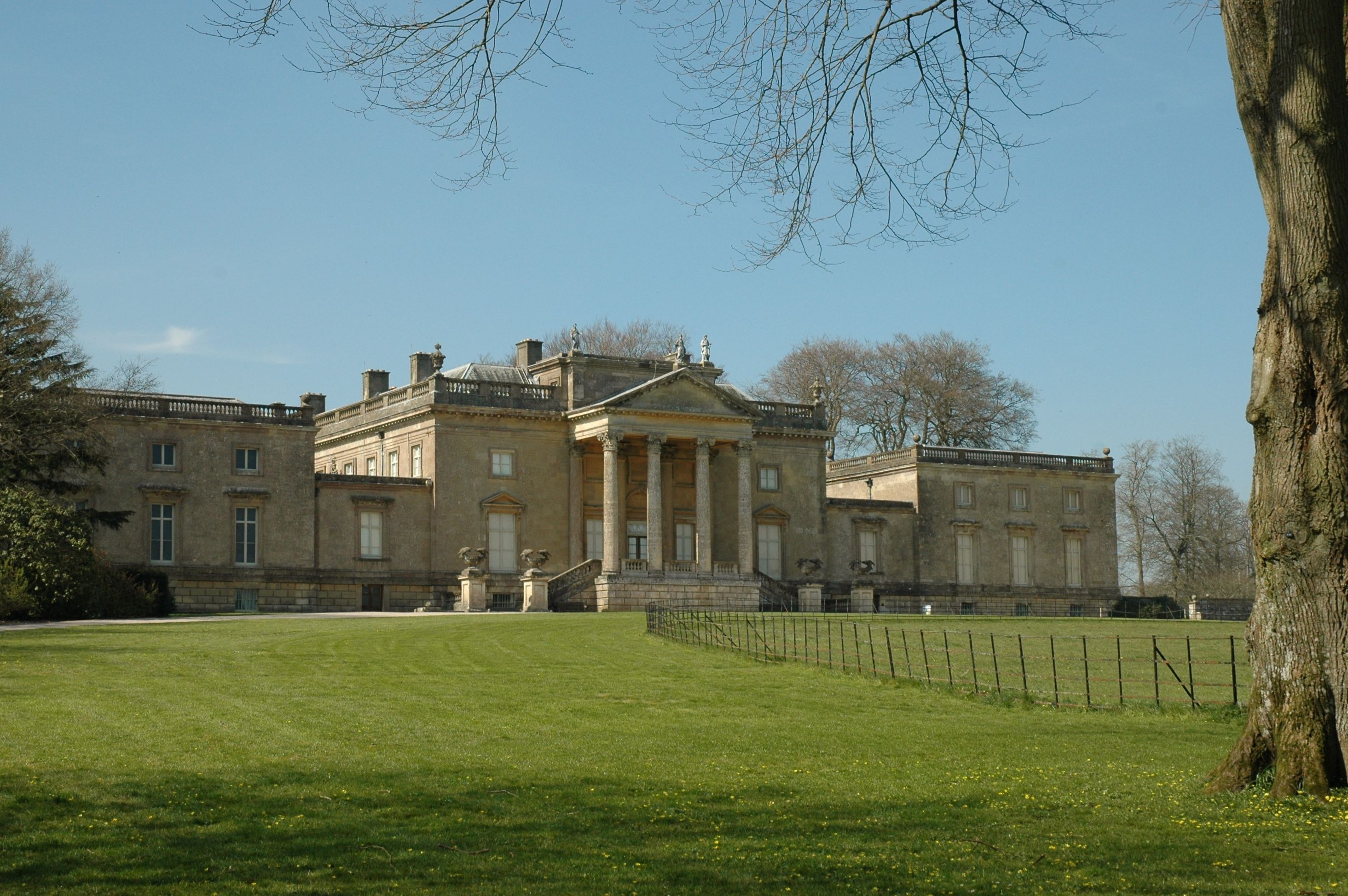
Stourhead House, on which the exterior of Creighton-Ward Mansion was based

Penelope owns a six-wheeled Rolls-Royce called FAB 1, painted in her trademark shade of pink. The vehicle is driven by Parker. FAB 1 is equipped with various features to assist Penelope's field operative work, such as machine guns, bulletproof glass, water skis for sea excursions, and radar-assisted steering. Penelope also owns a private yacht named FAB 2, a champion racehorse or helijet named FAB 3, and Seabird, a 40-foot (12 m) cruise ship. Several Seabirds have been constructed, as they are frequently destroyed in use.

The seat of the Creighton-Ward dynasty is Creighton-Ward Mansion, an 18th-century stately home in Foxleyheath, Kent. The first mansion was built on the site of a Norman castle by the first Lord Creighton-Ward after he was knighted by Elizabeth I, who was a regular visitor. The current mansion was built by Lord Cuthbert Creighton-Ward in 1730 after he burned down the previous house during a gunpowder experiment. Lord Cuthbert asked architect Colen Campbell to design the iconic Palladian edifice, which has been designated a Grade I listed building by the World Heritage Organisation. When Penelope became a secret agent, she renovated the historic building to better suit her double lifestyle by installing a satellite antenna, a number of two-way video communication consoles for contacting International Rescue, and a safe with state-of-the-art alarm system and CCTV. A forensic laboratory was built on the site of old servants' quarters. An underground river with a boat runs beneath the estate, and if Penelope thinks that Creighton-Ward Mansion is under surveillance or that she is in danger, she can meet Parker at a nearby village without anyone knowing.

Penelope also owns Bonga Bonga, a sheep station in the Australian outback housing 200,007 sheep ("Atlantic Inferno"). The property was acquired by Bertie "Buster" Creighton-Ward. The open-plan lounge, with its modern fabrics and simple geometric designs, is in sharp contrast to the detail of Creighton-Ward Mansion.

=== Penelon ===
"Penelon" was created by fashion designer François Lemaire, who named it in honour of his favourite model, Lady Penelope. This fabric has extraordinary properties: Penelon can be converted into any costume design, squeezed into a space the size of a match box and be fashioned to resemble any other material. The fabric is sought after by Lemaire's rivals, and after Penelope discovers that they have bugged his office, she suggests that the unveiling of Lemaire's new all-Penelon collection be held on board the aircraft Skythrust, designed by International Rescue's engineer, Brains.

== Reception ==
Thunderbirds script editor Alan Pattillo admired the character, finding her more interesting than the Tracys: "All the men had to do was pilot these marvellous craft [...] Penelope was much more flexible. She wasn't living on this island in a practically all-male society. She lived a life of her own, but she enjoyed participating with International Rescue where necessary."

The character has been well received by commentators. Starburst magazine calls Penelope one of the series' "best-loved characters". According to Angus Allan, Penelope and Parker "became a cult in themselves." Commenting on the Thunderbirds cast, writer John Peel singles out Penelope for particular praise, referring to her as the "one character in the show who positively shone". He approves of her characterisation as a secret agent obliged to play the role of a "bored aristocrat", identifying parallels with male literary characters such as James Bond, Zorro and the Scarlet Pimpernel. Commentator Bill Osgerby argues that Penelope and Parker were added to the series to "play up to American perceptions of the British class system", noting Penelope's status as an "aristocratic amateur" in contrast with the "meritocratic professionals" embodied by the Tracy men. He also describes the character as a "pop feminist" and an "emblem of Swinging Sixties femininity", comparing her to Emma Peel and Modesty Blaise. Considering Penelope and Parker to be "amongst the most popular and recognisable TV characters ever created", Robert Sellers comments that they "[stole] the show", with Penelope in particular "following in the liberated footsteps of Cathy Gale and Emma Peel."

Anderson argued that the character "broke the mould" for depictions of women in children's television. She also believed that after Penelope's early appearances, in which she played more of a supporting role, the character quickly rose to prominence: "All the heroines in our previous series had been perfect foils to the action-man heroes, but now, with Lady Penelope, we had an action girl who was a personality in her own right." When Thunderbirds was repeated on the BBC in the early 2000s, the character was criticised for smoking, wearing furs and not using seat belts in cars. Anderson commented that smoking and fur-wearing in particular were likely to be viewed by modern audiences as politically incorrect, calling them two of several "stereotyped prejudices" in Thunderbirds. She elaborated: "We were limited by the age in which we lived, and although we prided ourselves on setting new boundaries, I suppose we were too obsessed with the Space Age, nuclear power and their consequences to be more aware of green and other more down-to-earth issues." Brian Viner writes that the character smoked "with the élan of Grace Kelly".

== 2004 film ==
During the production of the 2004 live-action film, actress Sophia Myles had a movement director to help her give the character a graceful walk. In an interview with Starburst magazine, Myles said that her interpretation of the character was not based on a particular person, but was instead the result of "drawing all the fantastic elements from the original and adding my own personal twists to make it my own."

In a negative preview of the film, XPosé magazine criticised the new Penelope's characterisation, commenting that she seemed to have "turned into Barbara Cartland, as though someone's decided that her defining character trait is the colour pink."

== In other media ==
In the period 1965 to 1969, Lady Penelope stories were adapted into comics form, first in the comic TV Century 21, and then in her own spin-off title.

Penelope, again voiced by Sylvia Anderson, appeared to the character of Edina Monsoon in a dream sequence in "Hospital", a 1994 episode of the sitcom Absolutely Fabulous.

== As an eponym ==
In 1994, Virgin Atlantic named its first Boeing 747-400 after Penelope. The aircraft's registration, inspired by FAB 1, was G-VFAB. The aircraft was retired in September 2015.

In 2003, Virgin Trains West Coast named locomotive 57307 Lady Penelope. The locomotive retained this name after it was sold to Direct Rail Services in 2013.

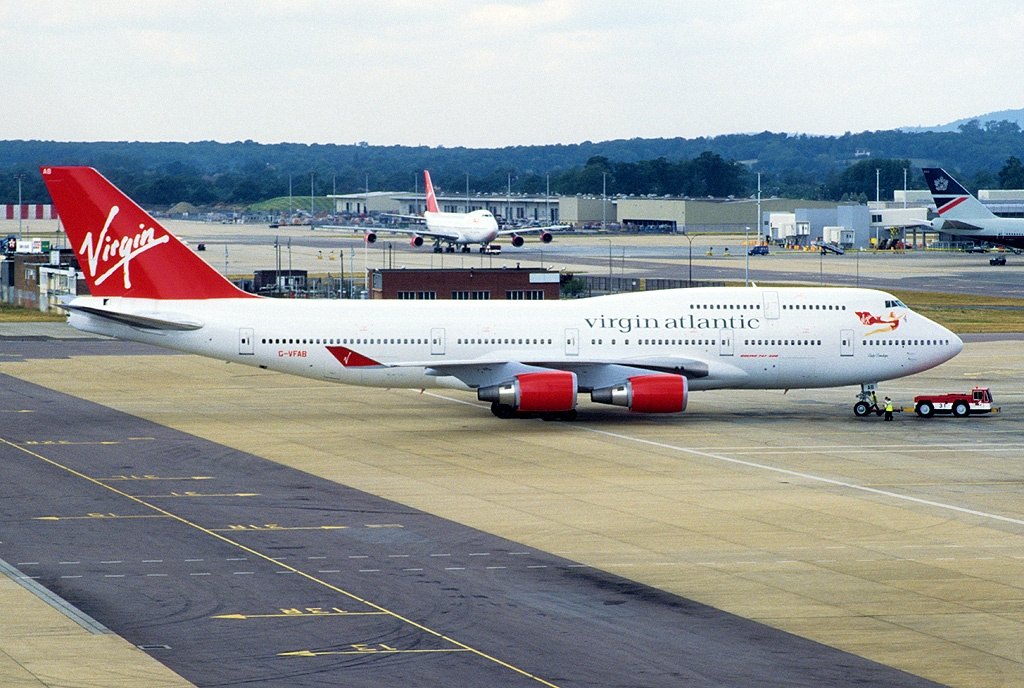
Boeing 747-400 G-VFAB ("Lady Penelope") in 1994

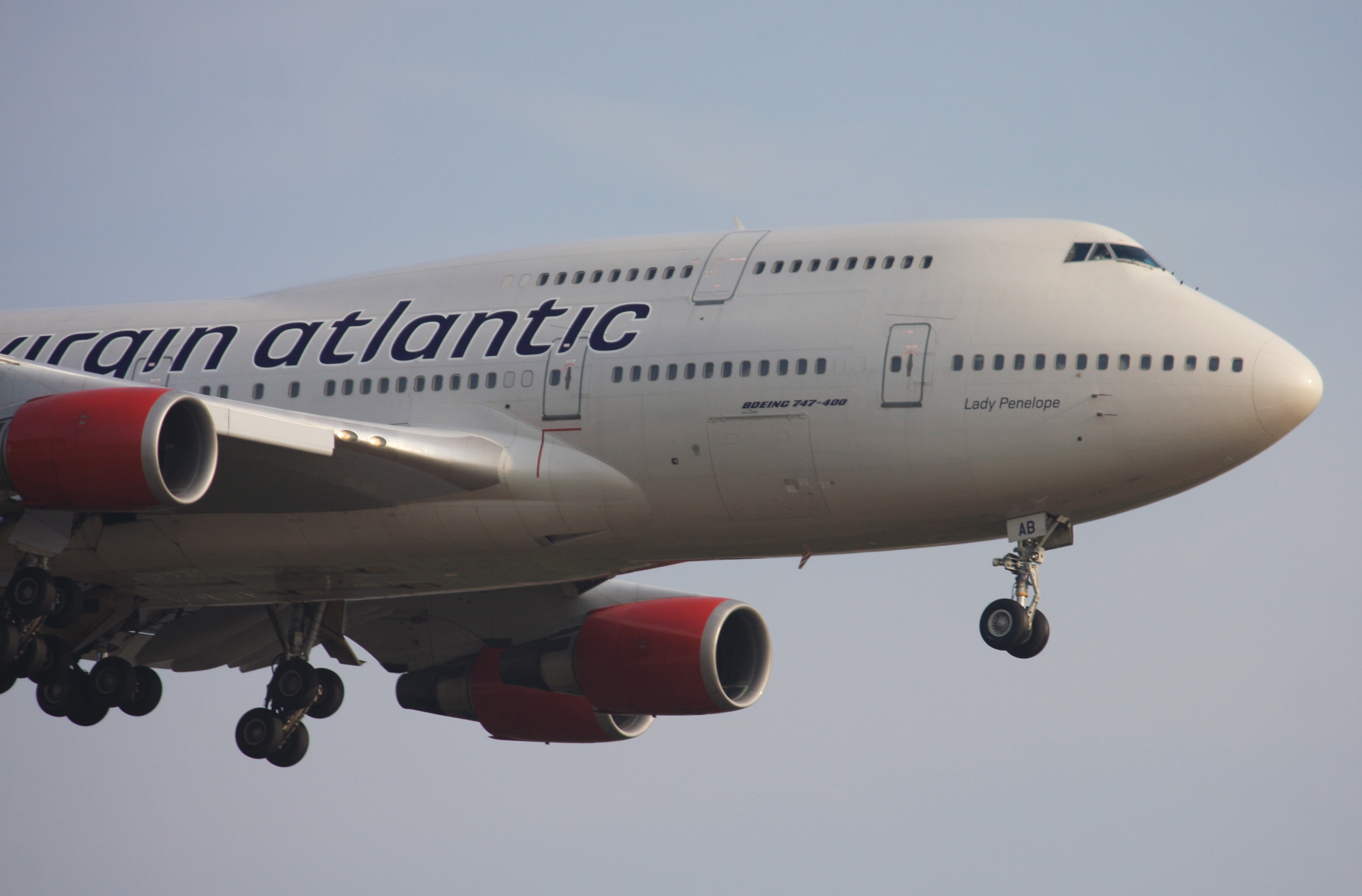
Detail of G-VFAB in 2013

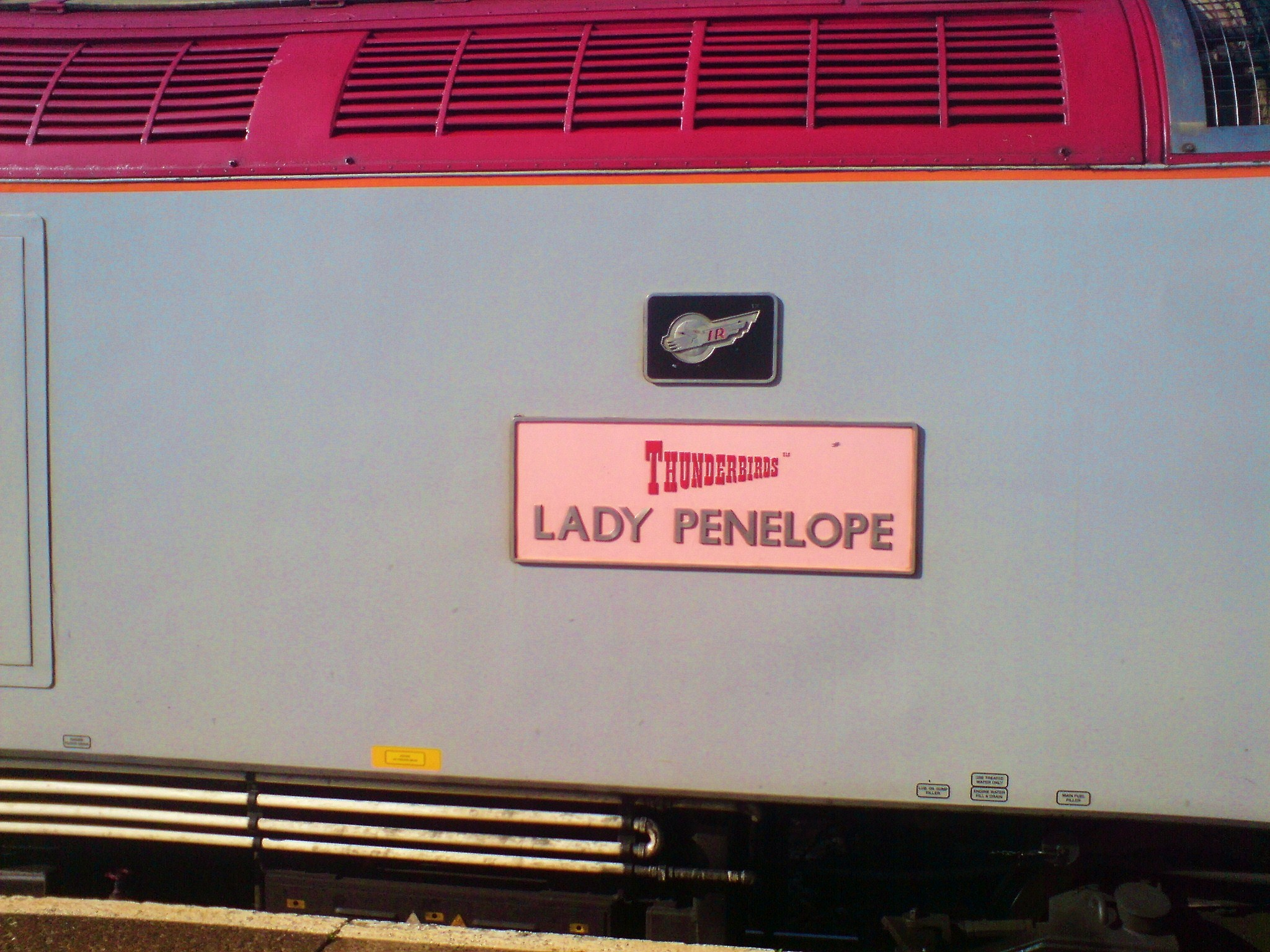
Nameplate on Virgin Trains' locomotive Lady Penelope in 2008

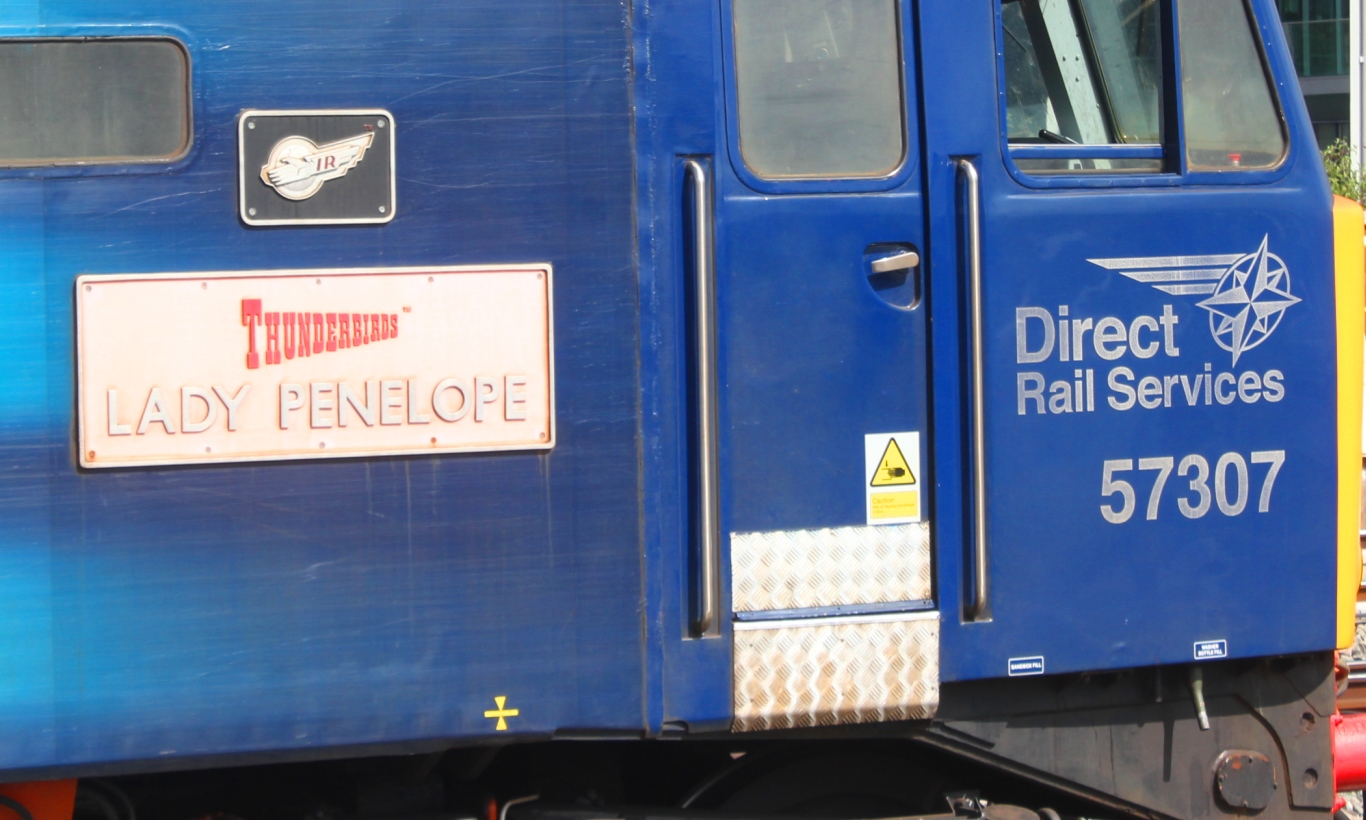
Lady Penelope nameplate in 2022, after sale to Direct Rail Services
