= David Graham (actor) =

British actor (1925–2024)

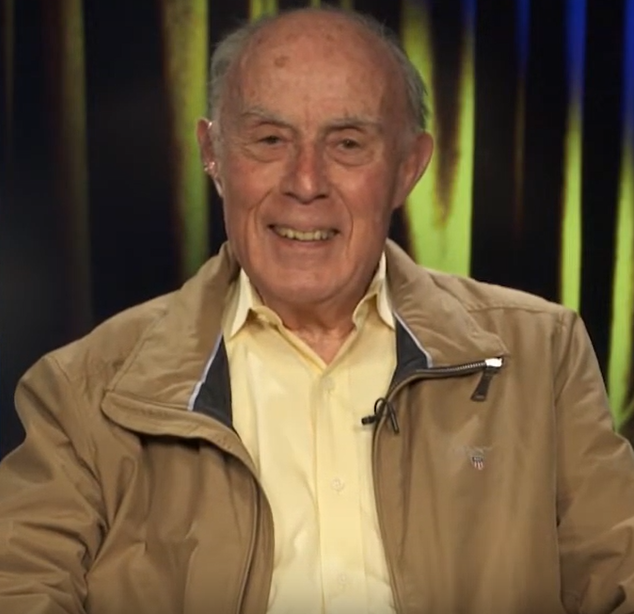
- Graham in 2016
- Born: David Michael Graham; 11 July 1925; London, England
- Died: 20 September 2024 (aged 99)
- Occupation: Actor
- Years active: 1952–2024
- Known for: Doctor Who; Thunderbirds; Peppa Pig; Ben and Holly's Little Kingdom; Thunderbirds Are Go

David Michael Graham (11 July 1925 – 20 September 2024) was an English actor. He voiced the Daleks in Doctor Who, Gordon Tracy, Brains, Aloysius Parker and Kyrano in Thunderbirds, and Grandpa Pig in Peppa Pig.

== Life and career ==
Graham was born in London on 11 July 1925. His sister had married a G.I. and had moved to the United States, and his uncle had run away there, so he became an actor after leaving his Orthodox Jewish household. He trained in New York City, at the Neighborhood Playhouse School of the Theatre with Sanford Meisner, following service in the Royal Air Force as a radar mechanic.

Graham returned to England and began his theatre career, his breakout role being as Givola in The Resistible Rise of Arturo Ui, alongside Leonard Rossiter. A friend of his, actor Christopher Benjamin, recommended the role to him. He was then recommended by director Michael Blakemore to audition for Laurence Olivier's theatre company, eventually appearing alongside him in Saturday Sunday Monday, using an Italian accent.

While playing characters in the TV series Private Investigator in 1958, Graham met writer and producer Gerry Anderson, who was planning his first puppet productions. Graham mentioned to him that he could pull off accents well; this led to his first voiceover role in Four Feather Falls, as Grandpa Twink, whom he based on Walter Brennan. He subsequently voiced Dr. Beaker, Zarin and Mitch the Monkey in Supercar, Mat Matic and Lieutenant Ninety in Fireball XL5 and various guest characters in Stingray. Graham also played Johnny in Crossroads to Crime, a live-action film Anderson directed.

In 1963, he became the voice of the Daleks in Doctor Who, alongside Peter Hawkins, who devised the way they spoke. He believed Hawkins would always play superior and higher-pitched Daleks, while he voiced with a lower-pitch. He voiced the Daleks in all four of their major First Doctor era appearances, as well as two 1960s feature films: Dr. Who and the Daleks and Daleks' Invasion Earth 2150 A.D., departing due to other commitments, although he and Hawkins remained lifelong friends. Graham also voiced the Mechonoids and played the onscreen role of Charlie in The Gunfighters. He returned to his role as the voice of the Daleks in 2023, when he recorded new lines for that year's official colourised recut of the 1963 serial The Daleks for the show's 60th anniversary.

In 1965, Graham became the voices of Gordon Tracy, Brains, Aloysius Parker and Kyrano in Thunderbirds, as well as its film sequels: Thunderbirds Are Go and Thunderbird 6. He did not believe Brains had a stutter, claiming that he was instead excitedly trying to find the words to explain his latest ideas. He based the voice of Parker on a waiter at the King's Arms pub in Cookham, and he and Ray Barrett shared roles as many of the guest villains. Although he was not highly paid for production, the many repeats earned him a lot more. Parker became Anderson's favourite voice.

Between 1975 and 1977, Graham was part of the Radio Drama Company. In 1979, he played Professor Kerensky in the Doctor Who story City of Death. He, later, played the role of Big Brother in the "1984" television Super Bowl advert to introduce the Apple Macintosh computer, before reuniting with Hawkins and his wife, Rosemary Miller, to provide voices together in the English dub of German animated film Stowaways on the Ark. In 2004, Graham became the voice of Grandpa Pig in Peppa Pig, having known creator Mark Baker from when he was younger. The following year he played Albert Einstein in a Horizon docudrama, for which he was very proud that the BBC would select him to play the lead role.

In 2009, Graham began playing Edward Elgar in Stirring the Spirit, for which he thoroughly researched the composer, and he reprised the role many times over the next decade. From 2015 to 2020, he reprised his role as Parker in Thunderbirds Are Go, a reboot of the original series. Although Kayvan Novak took over as Brains, Graham had wanted to reprise that role as well; nonetheless he fully approved of Novak’s portrayal. Most of his dialogue was recorded with Rosamund Pike, who played Lady Penelope Creighton-Ward.

In April 2021, Graham announced his retirement from his Thunderbirds characters. In December, actor George Layton, a longtime friend of Graham's, announced on Twitter that Graham had suffered a stroke six months earlier and was unable to leave his home in London. However, Layton stated that Graham was recovering by performing voice-overs, and had since conducted interviews from his home.

Graham died on 20 September 2024, at the age of 99. Despite this, a representative of the Peppa Pig brand confirmed that further episodes featuring his voice would continue to be released until 2027.

== Filmography ==
=== Film ===
Year	Title	Role	Ref.
1960	Crossroads to Crime	Johnny	
1965	Dr. Who and the Daleks	Dalek voices	
1966	Daleks' Invasion Earth 2150 A.D.	Dalek voices	
1966	Thunderbirds Are Go	Gordon Tracy, Brains, Aloysius Parker	
1968	Thunderbird 6	Gordon Tracy, Brains, Aloysius Parker	
1982	Tenebrae	Det. Germani (Giuliano Gemma)	English version, uncredited
1988	Stowaways on the Ark	Brown Bear	English version
2009	The End	Ernest Samson	
2015	Peppa Pig: The Golden Boots	Grandpa Pig, Mr. Zebra	

=== Television ===
Year	Title	Role	Notes	Ref.
1957	O.S.S.	Pilot	Episode 14 "Operation Yo-Yo"	
1958-1959	Private Investigator	Luis d'Crux Shakespeare	3 episodes	
1960	Four Feather Falls	Grandpa Twink, Fernando	39 episodes each	
1961–1962	Supercar	Dr. Beaker, Zarin, Mitch the Monkey	39 episodes each	
1962–1963	Fireball XL5	Mat Matic, Lieutenant Ninety	39 episodes each	
1963	The Avengers	Producer	Episode: "Man in the Mirror"	
1963–1966, 1979	Doctor Who	Dalek voices, Mechonoid voices, Charlie, Professor Kerensky	35 episodes	
1964–1965	Stingray	Various	39 episodes	
1965	Danger Man	Detective	Episode 17: "The Affair at Castelevara"	
1965–1966	Thunderbirds	Gordon Tracy, Brains, Parker, Kyrano	32 episodes	
1969	The Secret Service	King of Muldovia, Air Traffic Controller, Lord Edward Hazelwell	2 episodes, uncredited	
1970–1971	Timeslip	2957	7 episodes	
1990–1991	Moomin	Snork	English version, 77 episodes	
1992–1994	So Haunt Me	Mr. Bloom	13 episodes	
2004–2024	Peppa Pig	Grandpa Pig, Mr. Zebra, Father Christmas	109 episodes, posthumous 2024-2027	
2005	Horizon	Albert Einstein	Episode: "Einstein's Unfinished Symphony"	
2009–2013	Ben and Holly's Little Kingdom	Wise Old Elf, Mr. Gnome, Wiser Older Elf	46 episodes	
2015–2020	Thunderbirds Are Go	Parker, Vic, Malloy	40 episodes	
