= List of films set in the future by date of setting =

Many released films take place fully or partially in a given year or period after the year they were released or made, even if that setting is now in the past. Only films with a specific future year given are included, and only future settings are listed below, not (then) present or past settings. Generally futuristic films without a specific year of setting are not included.

A specific future setting is common in science fiction films, but it may occur across other genres as well.

== Films ==
Title	Genre(s)	Country(ies)	Released	Setting (CE)	Plot
0–9
12 Monkeys	Science fiction thriller	UK; France; Japan; US; Germany	1995	1996–2035	In a post-apocalyptic future devastated by disease, a convict is sent back in time to gather information about the man-made virus that wiped out most of the human population on the planet.
2009: Lost Memories	Science fiction Action	South Korea	2002	2009	In an alternate 2009, where the Korean Peninsula is still part of Imperial Japan due to a time-travel incident in 1909.
2010: The Year We Make Contact	Science fiction	US	1984	2010	A joint American and Soviet crew that is sent to Jupiter to discover the reason behind the failure of the Discovery One mission.
2012	Disaster	US	2009	2012	The 2012 phenomenon occurs and numerous characters struggle to survive an eschatological sequence of events including earthquakes, volcanic eruptions, and megatsunamis.
2012: Supernova	Science fiction Disaster	US	2009	2012	When a star gone supernova threatens to destroy Earth, an astrophysicist puts together a dangerous and desperate plan to shield Earth from the destructive burst of radiation heading toward it.
2019, After the Fall of New York	Post-apocalyptic; Action	Italy; France	1983	2019	After a nuclear apocalypse, a mercenary is sent out to rescue the last fertile woman on Earth.
2020 Texas Gladiators	Science fiction Action	Italy	1984	2020	In a post-apocalyptic Texas, a band of warriors fight against a fascist regime that is trying to take control of the remaining population.
2067	Science fiction	Australia	2020	2067	A man journeys to the future to save a dying Earth devastated by climate change, deforestation and an ongoing nuclear war.
A
A.P.E.X.	Science fiction	US	1994	2073	A group of scientists explore the past using robotic probes known as the A.P.E.X. or "Advanced Prototype Exploration units".
Absolon	Post-apocalyptic; Science fiction	Canada; UK	2003	2007	In a future society, the only hope for survival from a deadly virus is a drug called Absolon.
Aditya 369	Science fiction	India	1991	2504	A time machine transports passengers to different time periods, including 1526 CE and a post-apocalyptic future in 2504 CE.
Adrenalin: Fear the Rush	Science fiction Action	US	1996	2007	In an alternative future, the Russian Federation has collapsed and Eastern Europe is in disarray, and out of this chaos an unknown virus covers the Earth and eventually the United States.
An Adventure Through Time	Animation; Adventure; Science fiction	Brazil	2007	2900s	A child scientist builds a time machine and four of his friends must travel through different periods of time to retrieve each of the four elements, with one of them being sent to the 30th century to recover the element of air, where he helps an astronaut fight space pirates.
Æon Flux	Science fiction Action	US	2005	2415	A mysterious female assassin working for a group of rebels trying to overthrow the government is sent on a mission to kill the Chairman, finding a whole new mystery to uncover.
The Age of Stupid	Docufiction	UK	2009	2055	A man living alone in a devastated world of 2055 asks "Why didn't we stop climate change when we had the chance?"
Akira	Animation; Cyberpunk action thriller	Japan	1989	2019	In a dystopian 2019, a biker's childhood friend acquires powerful telekinetic abilities after colliding with a child esper in a motorcycle accident, eventually threatening an entire military complex in the sprawling futuristic metropolis of Neo-Tokyo.
Alien Nation	Science fiction Action	US	1988	1991	The "Newcomers", an alien race settling in Los Angeles, begin their assimilation into humankind, much to the initial dismay of the local population.
Americathon	Science fiction Comedy	US	1979	1998	In a story told in narrative flashbacks, a young TV consultant is hired by the president of a bankrupt USA to organize a telethon in order to prevent the country from being repossessed by wealthy Native Americans.
The Apple	Musical; Science fiction	US; West Germany	1980	1994	In a futuristic 1994, a young singer signs to an evil label, entering the world of the music industry and subsequently the world of drugs.
The Atlantis Interceptors	Science fiction Action	Italy	1983	1994	Two Vietnam veterans and a team of scientists trying to raise a sunken Russian submarine face a battle for survival against marauding Atlanteans.
Automata	Science fiction Action	Spain; Bulgaria	2014	2044	In a routine investigation, an insurance agent at a robotics company makes a discovery that has deep consequences for mankind.
B
Back to the Future Part II	Science fiction	US	1989	2015	A young man and an elderly doctor travel from 1985 to 2015 to prevent the former's son from tarnishing their family's future, and then to the past in 1955 to prevent their arch-nemesis from altering history for his benefit.
Barb Wire	Superhero	US	1996	2017	During the Second American Civil War in 2017, a nightclub owner's ex-lover, who is married to a fugitive, re-enters her life.
Battle for the Planet of the Apes	Science fiction	US	1973	2001–2670	After conquering the oppressive humans, the ape leader tries to keep the peace amongst the humans and apes, but uprisings endure.
Battlefield Earth	Science fiction	US	2000	3000	In the year 3000, humans rebel against the "Psychlos", a tyrannical alien species that has ruled Earth for a thousand years.
The Beach Party at the Threshold of Hell	Science fiction Comedy	US	2007	2097	In New America in the year 2097, two decades after a nuclear apocalypse, the last survivor of the Kennedy family, two robotic ex-secret service agents, and a female cannibal journey to find the "Threshold of Hell" to gain access to a radio tower to unite with other survivors.
Beyond the Time Barrier	Science fiction	US	1960	2024	A military test pilot from 1960 becomes stuck in a time warp which transports him to 2024, where he discovers that a pathogen has sterilized mankind.
Bharathan Effect	Science fiction	India	2007	2107	A genius inventor makes a small gadget that can fly without fuel using the concept of antigravity.
Bill & Ted's Excellent Adventure	Science fiction	US	1989	2688	Two metalhead slacker high school students travel through time to assemble historical figures for their high-school history presentation.
The Black Hole	Science fiction	US	1979	2130	In the year 2130, during its return to Earth, the research team aboard spacecraft USS Palomino encounters a black hole.
Blade Runner	Science fiction Cyberpunk	US; Hong Kong	1982	2019	In a dystopian future Los Angeles of 2019 where synthetic humans known as replicants are bio-engineered by a powerful corporation to work on space colonies, a fugitive group of advanced replicants escapes back to Earth, so a former cop is recalled to hunt them down.
Blade Runner 2049	Science fiction Cyberpunk	US	2017	2049	A "blade runner" uncovers a secret that threatens to destabilize society and the course of civilization.
A Boy and His Dog	Science fiction Black comedy	US	1975	2024	A teenage boy and his telepathic dog work together as a team in order to survive in the dangerous post-apocalyptic wasteland of the Southwestern United States.
Brick Mansions	Dystopian; Action thriller	France; Canada; Turkey; US	2014	2018	An undercover policeman in a future Detroit navigates a dangerous neighborhood surrounded by deserted brick mansions with the help of an ex-con in order to bring down a crime lord and his plot to devastate the entire city.
Buck Rogers	Science fiction	US	1939	2440	A pilot and his young friend awake from 500 years in suspended animation to find that the world has been taken over by an army of outlaws.
C
Cargo	Science fiction	Switzerland	2009	2200s	In 2267, when the Earth has become uninhabitable due to an ecological collapse and the remaining people live on overcrowded space stations in Earth's orbit, a young doctor hoping for a better future alongside her sister on a distant planet takes a job on a cargo spaceship when strange things start to happen.
Cherry 2000	Science fiction Action	US	1987	2017	After a successful businessman damages his animatronic wife, he hires a tough tracker to guide him across a dangerous apocalyptic wasteland to an abandoned manufacturing warehouse where he hopes to find a duplicate model.
Children of Men	Dystopian; Action thriller	UK; US; Japan	2006	2027	A civil servant tries to help a refugee escape the chaos of a British government that practices detention, deportation and execution in a world on the brink of collapse due to two decades of human infertility.
Class of 1999	Science fiction Action thriller	US	1990	1999	In a near-future Seattle where delinquency runs rampant, three ex-military humanoid robots are reprogrammed as school teachers.
Cloud Atlas	Science fiction	Germany; UK; US	2012	2144–2321	Multiple plots occur during six eras, with an ensemble cast performing multiple roles across these time periods. The last two of them are in the future: one in Korea in 2144 and another in Hawaii in 2321.
The Cloverfield Paradox	Science fiction Horror	US	2018	2028	After using a particle accelerator to try to solve Earth's energy crisis, an international group of astronauts aboard a space station must find a way home when the planet seemingly vanishes.
Conquest of the Planet of the Apes	Science fiction	US	1972	1991	In a world that has embraced ape slavery, an ape surfaces out of hiding from the authorities and prepares for a rebellion against humanity.
Cowboy Bebop: The Movie	Science fiction Action; Animation	Japan	2001	2071	A mysterious terrorist plans to exterminate the human population of Mars by releasing a virus, while the bounty hunter crew of a spaceship works to capture the terrorist and prevent the attack.
The Creator	Science fiction Action	US	2023	2055; 2065–2070	In 2070, 15 years after artificial intelligence set off a nuclear detonation in Los Angeles, a war of humans against AI began, so a former special forces agent is recruited to hunt down and kill the "Creator", who has developed a mysterious weapon with the power to end the war.
Cyborg 2087	Science fiction	US	1966	2087	In 2087, when free thought is illegal and the population is controlled by governments, a small band of free thinkers sends a cyborg back in time to 1966 to prevent a professor from revealing his new discovery.
D
Daleks – Invasion Earth: 2150 A.D.	Science fiction	UK	1966	2150	An eccentric inventor and time traveller and his companions arrive in 2150, only to discover that the planet has been invaded and its population enslaved by a dreaded race of mutant cybernetic aliens.
Daybreakers	Science fiction Action-horror	US; Australia	2009	2019	In a futuristic world overrun by vampires, a vampiric corporation sets out to capture and farm the remaining humans while researching a substitute for human blood, while a vampire hematologist's work is interrupted by human survivors led by a former vampire who has a cure that can save the human species.
Dead End Drive-In	Dystopian; Action	Australia	1986	1990s	A teenage couple is trapped in a drive-in theatre, which is really a concentration camp for punk-sporting societal rejects, which are placated with a steady diet of junk food, new wave music, drugs, and exploitation films.
Death Machine	Science fiction Horror	UK; Japan	1994	2003	After a mad genius inventor of killer robots and cyborgs at a megacorporation kills executives, he unleashes his ultimate death machine on the new CEO firing him.
Death Race 2000	Dystopian; Science fiction Action	US	1975	2000	In the year 2000, participants of the murderous Transcontinental Road Race score points by striking and killing pedestrians, while its leading champion is targeted by an underground rebel movement seeking to abolish the race.
Demolition Man	Science fiction Action	US	1993	1996–2032	A confrontation between an evil crime lord and a risk-taking police officer with a reputation for causing destruction while carrying out his work results in both being sentenced to be cryogenically frozen in 1996. In 2032, the crime lord escapes and the authorities awaken the officer to help capture him.
Deterrence	Political thriller drama	France; US	1999	2008	The US President must deal with an international military crisis while confined to a Colorado diner during a freak snowstorm.
Double Dragon	Martial arts Fantasy; Post-apocalyptic	US	1994	2007	In an earthquake-crippled Los Angeles in 2007, two brothers have half of a powerful ancient Chinese talisman, while an evil gang leader has the other half and is determined to get the brothers' half so he can have the complete medallion, which will grant absolute power.
Droid	Science fiction	US	1988	2020	In a crime-ridden Los Angeles in 2020, a member of the police force is sent on a mission to recover a digital decoder that will shut down the renegade police force, but droids called reformers led in a revolt.
E
Elysium	Dystopian; Science fiction	US	2013	2154	In a future where the citizens of a ravaged Earth live in extreme poverty while the rich and powerful live in an luxurious orbiting space station, a man takes on a mission that could bring equality to the polarized worlds.
Endgame	Post-apocalyptic	Italy	1983	2025	A telepathic mutant recruits a post-nuclear war TV game-show warrior to lead her band of mutants to safety.
Escape from L.A.	Post-apocalyptic	US	1996	2013	In a future where the United States is ruled by a theocratic President for life and Los Angeles became a prison island after an earthquake severed the city from the mainland, the president's daughter steals the remote of a new superweapon and escapes to L.A., so a former U.S. Green Berets lieutenant is recruited to retrieve the remote in exchange for the waiving of his upcoming deportation.
Escape from New York	Science fiction Action	US	1981	1997	In a future crime-ridden US where Manhattan has been converted into the country's sole maximum security prison, a special forces operative turned federal prisoner is given 24 hours to rescue the President of the United States after Air Force One is hijacked by anti-government insurgents who deliberately crash it into the walled-off borough.
Event Horizon	Science fiction Horror	US; UK	1997	2047	The crew of a rescue vessel are sent to investigate a spaceship that mysteriously vanished seven years prior during its maiden voyage to Proxima Centauri and has reappeared in orbit around Neptune. Accompanied by the ship's designer, they board the derelict ship to search for survivors and determine what happened after its experimental gravity drive, meant for faster-than-light travel by folding space-time, was activated.
F
The Fifth Element	Science fiction Action	France	1997	2200s	The survival of planet Earth becomes the responsibility of a taxi driver and former special forces major after a young woman falls into his cab, so they join forces to recover four mystical stones essential for the defence of Earth against the impending attack of a malevolent cosmic entity.
First Spaceship on Venus	Science fiction	East Germany; Poland	1960	1980	After finding an ancient, long-buried flight recorder that originally came from a spaceship, a human spaceship is dispatched to Venus, where the crew discovers a long-dead alien civilization that had constructed a device intended to destroy all life on Earth prior to invasion but perished in a global nuclear war before they could execute their plan.
The Flying Torpedo	Silent drama	US	1916	1921	In 1921, a novelist befriends a young inventor who has just created a radio-controlled flying bomb (weaponry that would come to be known as guided missiles). After the inventor is murdered by Eastern spies who steal his new invention, the novelist and his Swedish maid set out to find the spies, who have been invading the United States.
The Fountain	Epic; Science fiction Romantic; Drama	US	2006	2500	Three interwoven storylines involving immortality and the resulting loves lost, and one man's pursuit of avoiding this fate in this life or beyond it: a conquistador and his ill-fated queen, a modern-day scientist and his cancer-stricken wife, and a traveler immersed in a universal journey alongside aspects of his lost love.
Frankenstein Unbound	Science fiction Horror	US	1990	2031	A scientist in the futuristic year of 2031 invents the prototype of a powerful weapon, but the invention inadvertently creates rifts in space and time—one of which he is caught into, so he lands in Switzerland in 1817, where he meets Victor Frankenstein, another scientist with a creation gone awry.
Freejack	Science fiction	US	1992	2009	A group of bounty hunters from the future transports a doomed race car driver to New York City in 2009, where his mind will be replaced with that of a dead billionaire.
G
Ghost in the Shell 2: Innocence	Cyberpunk; Animation	Japan	2004	2032	A cyborg detective for an anti-terrorist unit investigates the case of a female robot created solely for sexual pleasure who slaughtered her owner.
Ghosts of Mars	Action; Horror	United States	2001	2176	On a colonized Mars in the 22nd century, a squad of police officers and a convicted criminal fight against the residents of a mining colony who have been possessed by the ghosts of the planet's original inhabitants.
Godzilla vs. King Ghidorah	Kaiju	Japan	1991	2204	Time travelers from the future convince Japan to travel back in time to prevent Godzilla's mutation, only to reveal their true motives by unleashing King Ghidorah onto the nation.
H
The Halt	Dystopian; Drama	Philippines	2019	2034	In 2034, after a massive volcanic eruption, Manila has been in the dark for the last three years without a single sunlight, while riots control countries and communities, epidemics ravage the continent, and millions have died.
Happy Accidents	Science fiction Romantic comedy	US	2000	2470	A New York City woman with a string of failed relationships meets a man who claims to be from the year 2470.
Harley Davidson and the Marlboro Man	Neo-Western; Biker; Buddy; Action	US	1991	1996	In the near future United States, two friends–a melancholic biker and a world-weary bullrider–rob the bank threatening their favorite bar with foreclosure in hopes of paying it off with its own money, only to discover that it is a front for a criminal cartel.
Hell	Post-apocalyptic	Germany; Switzerland	2011	2016	A young woman, her boyfriend, and her younger sister venture through the blighted wasteland of Germany after a climate crisis has destroyed society.
Hellraiser: Bloodline	Science fiction Horror	US	1996	2127	In the future, an engineer who is the descendant of a celebrated toymaker has designed a space station that he believes can trap and destroy a race of extra-dimensional, demonic beings, who had been accidentally summoned.
High Treason	Science fiction Silent	UK	1929	1940/50	In a future world threatened by a conflict between two superstates, women unite to prevent financiers from engineering a second world war.
Highlander II: The Quickening	Science fiction	US; France; Argentina	1991	2024	An immortal sets out to free Earth from the corrupt operators of an artificial ozone layer.
Highlander: The Search for Vengeance	Science fiction Animation	Japan; Hong Kong; US	2007	2187	An immortal must choose between confronting another immortal who killed his lover centuries ago or saving the survivors of a ravaged New York City.
I
I Am Legend	Post-apocalyptic; Action; Horror; Thriller	US	2007	2009–2012	After a virus originally created to cure cancer ends up wiping out most of mankind, a virologist who is immune to the pathogen becomes the last human in New York City except for hostile mutants, so he has to work in the development of a cure while defending himself against them.
I, Robot	Science fiction Action	US	2004	2035	In 2035, when highly intelligent robots fill public service positions throughout the world operating under the Three Laws of Robotics to keep humans safe, a Chicago detective investigates the alleged suicide of a robotics company founder and believes that a human-like robot murdered him.
Idiocracy	Science fiction Comedy	US	2006	2505	An average-intelligence army librarian and a prostitute undergo a voluntary government hibernation experiment and awake five hundred years later to find a dystopian, decadent, anti-intellectual society.
Immortel (Ad Vitam)	Science fiction Animation	France	2004	2095	In a future Earth occupied by ancient gods and genetically altered humans, a god who is sentenced to death seeks a new human host and a woman to bear his child.
Impostor	Science fiction Psychological thriller	US	2001	2079	As an alien race uses androids as bombs to attack Earth, a government weapons specialist is accused of being one such android and sets out to prove his innocence.
Iron Sky	Science fiction Comedy	Finland; Germany; Australia	2012	2018	A group of German Nazis who had been secretly hiding in a lunar base since their defeat in 1945 build a space fleet to return in 2018 and attempt to re-conquer Earth.
The Island	Science fiction Action	US	2005	2019	Two human clones who live in a dystopian compound isolated from the outside world decide to escape it after learning that its inhabitants are clones used for organ harvesting as well as surrogacy for wealthy people, with the goal of exposing the illegal cloning movement.
It! The Terror from Beyond Space	Science fiction Horror	US	1958	1973	After being rescued, the single survivor from the crashed spaceship of the first manned mission to Mars claims his crew was killed by a Martian life form, but none of the rescue team believes him until the creature, now a stowaway, begins hunting them on their return trip to Earth.
J
Jason X	Science fiction Slasher	US	2002	2008; 2455	Jason Voorhees is cryogenically frozen for over 400 years and awakens on a spaceship after being found by a group of students whom he kills one by one.
Judge Dredd	Science fiction Action	US	1995	2139	In a future desolate Earth where a corps of "Street Judges" exercise the combined roles of police, judge, jury and executioner, one of the most dedicated of the "Street Judges" is framed for murder by his own psychotic half-brother, who plots to take over Mega-City One with an army of superhuman clones.
L
The Last Man on Earth	Comedy; Silent	US	1924	1940	A plague kills all post-pubescent males except for a hermit disillusioned with love, who is now desired by millions of women, but he still yearns for his initial love interest, making him a treasured last man.
The Last Man on Earth	Post-apocalyptyic; Science fiction Horror	US; Italy	1964	1968	After a disease turns almost all of humanity into vampires, the sole survivor becomes a reluctant vampire hunter.
Logan	Superhero	US	2017	2029	An aged Wolverine and an extremely ill Charles Xavier must defend a young mutant from a supervillain team.
Love Insurance Kompany	Science fiction Romantic comedy	India	2026	2040	In a futuristic 2040 where people fall in love through a dating app, a man who believes in natural love falls for a woman who trusts the app, leading him to challenge the system.
Looper	Science fiction Action thriller	US	2012	2044–2074	Present-day contract killers called "loopers" target victims who are illegally sent back in time by criminal syndicates from the future.
Love Story 2050	Science fiction Fantasy	India	2009	2050	A present-day man travels to 2050 in an attempt of bringing his deceased girlfriend back to life.
M
Masthishka Maranam	Cyberpunk; Comedy	India	2026	2046	In 2046 in a dystopian Kochi, a grieving father enters a virtual-reality memory game to reconnect with his dead daughter and inadvertently becomes entangled in a scandal.
Meet the Robinsons	Science fiction Comedy; Animation	US	2007	2037	An orphaned 12-year-old inventor meets a young time traveler who takes him to the future, before an incident wrecks the latter's time machine, so the former agrees to help him fix the machine and ends up acquainted with his eccentric family, while a mysterious man with a sentient bowler hat aims to sabotage his fate.
Memories	Science fiction Anthology	Japan	1995	2092	The crew of a deep space salvage freighter responds to a distress signal from a station run by an AI opera diva who manipulates the ship's life support, virtual reality and nanosystems, posing dangers the crew must overcome to survive.
Men Must Fight	Drama; Pre-Code	US	1933	1940	In 1940, a second world war occurs with aerial bombings of New York City and advanced technology such as videophones.
Mercy	Science fiction Thriller	US	2026	2029	A detective is accused of murdering his wife and must prove his innocence to an artificial intelligence judge.
Minority Report	Cyberpunk; Action	US	2002	2054	In a 2054 Washington D.C. where a specialized "precrime" police department apprehends would-be criminals with the use of foreknowledge provided by psychics called "precogs", a man becomes a fugitive after being accused of a crime he did not commit.
Mission to Mars	Science fiction Adventure	US	2000	2020–2022	After the first crewed Mars exploration mission goes awry, an American astronaut helps to coordinate a rescue mission for a colleague.
Moon 44	Science fiction Action	West Germany	1990	2038	On a futuristic space mining site where convicts and teenage technicians are partnered, an undercover agent must discover what has happened to missing corporate shuttles.
Moon Child	Science fantasy Horror; Action	Japan	2003	2014	A story of love and friendship on the harsh streets of a 2014 Chinese city that is a 'melting pot' of different Asian groups.
Moon Zero Two	Science fiction	UK	1969	2021	While the Moon is under the process of being colonized, a former astronaut turned salvager living there helps a millionaire space industrialist capture a sapphire asteroid, while also helping a woman find her missing brother.
Mutant Action	Science fiction Black comedy	Spain; France	1993	2012	In a future Earth where attractive people rule, a group of mutant terrorists kidnap a rich businessman's daughter to claim rights for the ugly. Escaping police in their spaceship, the mutant leader crashes into a planet of crazy miners where no women live.
Mutant Chronicles	Science fiction Steampunk; Action-horror	UK; US	2008	2707	A future soldier leads a fight against an army of underworld mutants.
N
Natural City	Science fiction	South Korea	2003	2080	In a dystopian colony world that integrates robots, androids and cyborgs amongst the population, some of the machines revolt, and a military officer in charge of doing away with the unruly cyborgs also loves the gynoid that looks over him.
Nemesis	Cyberpunk; Action	US	1993	2020	In a world populated by androids, a cybernetically-enhanced, ex-counterterrorism operative is charged by his former employers with assassinating his former lover, the leader of an underground militant group.
The New Barbarians	Post-apocalyptic; Action	Italy	1982	2019	In 2019, following a nuclear holocaust, two loners among the remains of the starving human race protect a group of pilgrims from a vicious gang bent on genocide.
No Escape	Science fiction Action	US; UK	1994	2022	In a dystopian future, a former Reconnaissance Marine serves life imprisonment on an island inhabited by savage and cannibalistic prisoners.
O
Oblivion	Epic; Post apocalyptic Science fiction Action	US	2013	2077	On a post-apocalyptic Earth desolated by an alien war, a maintenance technician on the verge of completing his mission recovers a woman who survived a space pod crash, leading him to question his purpose and discover the truth about the war.
P
Parasite	Science fiction Horror	US	1982	1992	In a dystopian, post-apocalyptic future, the United States has been taken over by a criminal organization which unwittingly creates an uncontrollable deadly parasite and sets it loose on the population.
Patlabor: The Movie	Science fiction Animation	Japan	1989	1999	A screwball police force must investigate and stop a spree of rampaging construction robots.
Patlabor 2: The Movie	Science fiction political thriller Animation	Japan	1993	2002	A terrorist attack is blamed on the Air Force, so a screwball police officer gets caught in the middle of a growing political conflict.
Paycheck	Science fiction Action	US	2003	2007	A reverse engineer finds himself hunted by both the FBI and a tech CEO after his memory was erased.
Pinocchio 3000	Science fantasy Animation	Spain; France; Canada	2004	3000	A robot created by an old inventor as his son attempts to fit into living with humans in a futuristic city constantly under development and under the reign of an evil mayor.
Planet of the Apes	Science fiction	US	1968	1972; 3978	An astronaut crew crash-lands on a strange planet in the distant future where they stumble upon a society in which apes have evolved into creatures with human-like intelligence and speech and assumed the role of the dominant species while humans are mute primitives wearing animal skins.
Planet of the Apes	Science fiction Action	US	2001	2029	An astronaut crash-lands on a planet inhabited by intelligent apes who treat humans as slaves, but with the help of a benevolent ape he starts a rebellion as he seeks to return.
The Postman	Epic; Post-apocalyptic; Adventure	US	1997	2013	In a post-apocalyptic neo-Western United States, a nomad finds a Postal Service uniform and unwittingly sparks a movement to restore the country that challenges the rule of a tyrannical warlord.
Predator 2	Science fiction Horror	US	1990	1997	A disgruntled police detective battles a malevolent and technologically advanced extraterrestrial in the streets of Los Angeles.
Privilege	Musical; Science fiction Comedy-drama	UK	1967	1970	A famous popstar is used as a tool by the state to divert people from political activity and keep the population in check.
Project Moonbase	Science fiction	US	1953	1970	In a future where the United States is considering building bases on the Moon, a saboteur posing as a scientist strives to destroy the world's first space station.
R
Rain Without Thunder	Science fiction	US	1993	2042	In a future US where women are imprisoned for aborting, an investigating reporter is determined to reveal the truth behind the convictions.
Ready Player One	Science fiction Action	US	2018	2045	In a dystopian future where much of humanity uses a virtual reality simulation to escape the real world, a teenage orphan finds clues to a contest that promises ownership of the simulation to the winner, and he and his friends try to complete it before an evil corporation can do so.
Reign of Fire	Post apocalyptic Science fantasy monster Action	US	2002	2020	Eighteen years after a London Underground tunnelling project inadvertently awakens dragons from centuries of slumber, the creatures have subsequently replaced humans as the dominant species on Earth, so two surviving parties find that they must work together to hunt down and destroy the beasts in a desperate attempt to take back the world.
Renaissance	Tech noir	France; UK; Luxembourg	2006	2054	In a futuristic and slightly dystopian Paris, a French policeman investigates the kidnapping of a scientist who may hold the key to eternal life.
Returner	Science fiction Action	Japan	2002	2084	A hitman and a time traveler team up in present-day Japan to prevent an alien race from invading Earth.
Riki-Oh: The Story of Ricky	Martial arts Splatter	Hong Kong	1991	2001	A young man who has super-human power and fighting abilities is held in a dystopian private prison.
Rio 2096: A Story of Love and Fury	Animation; Drama	Brazil	2013	2096	The film follows important moments in the history of Brazil, including a future war over water in 2096.
RoboCop	Science fiction superhero	US	2014	2028	In a future where the US is the only country that has not automated its police force, a detective becomes critically injured and is turned into a cyborg police officer whose programming blurs the line between man and machine.
Rollerball	Dystopian; Science fiction Sports	US	1975	2018	In a "not too distant" future world ruled by a corporatocracy, rollerbal, an often-brutal, spectacular sport, is used to help placate the populace and its top player finds himself at odds with the ruling powers when his popularity threatens to hurt their grip on power.
Rollerball	Science fiction Sports	US	2002	2005	In a future world, a corporate government uses a lethal sport as entertainment for the masses.
S
Screamers	Science fiction Horror	Canada; US; Japan	1995	2078	A military commander stationed off planet during an interplanetary war between two mining companies travels through the devastated landscape to negotiate a peace treaty, but discovers that the primitive robots they built to kill enemy combatants have gained sentience.
Shanghai Fortress	Science fiction Action	China	2019	2042	In 2042, the human race makes its last stand in Shanghai fighting against aliens who try to seize a hidden energy source on Earth.
Sleeper	Science fiction Comedy	US	1973	2173	The owner of a health food store is cryogenically frozen in 1973 and defrosted 200 years later in a ineptly led police state.
Snowpiercer	Post apocalyptic Action thriller	South Korea; US; France; Czech Republic	2013	2031	After a failed attempt at climate engineering to stop global warming has created a new Snowball Earth, a train travels a globe-encircling track carrying the last remnants of humanity, and lower-class tail-section passengers rebel against the elite of the front of the train.
Solar Crisis	Science fiction Thriller	US; Japan	1990	2050	After an immense solar flare is predicted to fry the Earth, astronauts must fly toward the sun to drop a bomb at the right time for the flare to be aimed elsewhere.
Soylent Green	Dystopian; Thriller	US	1973	2022	In a future where dying oceans and year-round humidity cause pollution, depleted resources, poverty, crime, and overpopulation, an innocent cop stumbles on the truth.
The Spirit of '76	Comedy	US	1990	2176	In the future, after a magnetic storm erases all recorded history, including the U.S. Constitution, three time travelers are sent back to July 4, 1776, to retrieve the heritage, but end up in 1976's Bicentennial, while being perceived as aliens.
Split Second	Dystopian; Buddy cop Science fiction	UK; US	1992	2008	A burnt-out police detective obsessively hunts down the mysterious serial killer who killed his partner several years prior.
Steel Frontier	Post-apocalyptic; Science fiction neo-Western	US	1995	2019	A lone gunman fights a gang of bandits who have invaded the town of New Hope.
Strange Days	Science fiction Thriller	US	1995	1999	A black marketeer of an electronic device that allows a user to experience the recorded memories and physical sensations of other people, and a bodyguard and limousine driver are drawn into a criminal conspiracy involving the former's ex-girlfriend.
Sunshine	Science fiction Psychological thriller	UK; US	2007	2057	The crew of a spacecraft go on a mission to deliver a stellar bomb intended to reignite the dying Sun.
Super	Dystopian political drama	India	2010	2030	It depicts a Utopian future where Indians are wealthy whereas Westerns take menial jobs. People who cannot speak Kannada are considered uneducated.
Sword Art Online the Movie: Ordinal Scale	Science fiction Action; Adventure; Animation	Japan	2017	2026	A female guild commander in a virtual world and her gang convince her love to try a new game.
T
Tamala 2010: A Punk Cat in Space	Avant-garde; Animation	Japan	2002	2010	A kitten from the Planet of Cats sets out toward the Orion constellation to solve the mystery of her birth.
Tank Girl	Post-apocalyptic; Science fiction	US	1995	2033	In a drought-ravaged Australia years after a catastrophic impact event, two female antiheros and a band of genetically modified supersoldiers fight an oppressive corporation.
The Terminator	Science fiction Action	US	1984	2029	A cyborg assassin is sent back in time from the post-apocalyptic 2029 to 1984 to assassinate a young diner waitress whose future son will one day save the world from a hostile artificial intelligence.
Terminator 2: Judgment Day	Science fiction Action	US	1991	1995–1997; 2029	A malevolent artificial intelligence sends a cyborg assassin back in time to 1995 to kill the future leader of the human resistance when he is a child, while the resistance sends back a less advanced, reprogrammed equivalent to protect the leader and ensure the future of humanity.
Terminator Genisys	Science fiction Action	US	2015	2017; 2029	A soldier from a post-apocalyptic 2029 where humanity wages war against a malevolent artificial intelligence is sent back to 1984 to protect a young woman.
Timecop 2: The Berlin Decision	Cyberpunk; Science fiction Action	US	2003	2025	A time police officer travels back in time to prevent a criminal mastermind from gaining control of the future.
The Time Machine	Period; Post-apocalpytic; Science fiction	US	1960	1966–802,701	A Victorian England inventor constructs a machine that enables him to travel into the distant future, where he discovers that mankind's descendants have divided into two species: one of passive, childlike vegetarians and another of underground-dwelling predators who feed on them.
The Tomorrow War	Military science fiction Action	US	2021	2022–2051	A mix of present-day soldiers and civilians are sent into the future to fight and stop a devastating alien swarm.
Titan A.E.	Post-apocalyptic; Science fiction Action	US	2000	3028	A young man receives a mission to save humanity and protect a giant spaceship that can create a new planet after a hostile alien species have destroyed the planet Earth and along the way joins up with a ship's crew and their captain, who help him race against time and find the ship before the aliens can destroy it.
Total Recall	Science fiction Action	US	1990	2084	A construction worker receives an implanted memory of a fantastical adventure on Mars and subsequently finds his adventure occurring in reality as agents of a shadow organization try to prevent him from recovering memories of his past as a Martian secret agent aiming to stop the tyrannical regime of the planet's dictator.
Trancers	Science fiction Action	US	1984	2247	A police detective from the 23rd century travels to the 1980s to bring his old nemesis to justice.
The Transformers: The Movie	Science fiction Action; Animation	US; Japan	1986	2005	Benevolent sentient robots must stop a colossal planet-consuming malevolent robot while at the same time they must defend themselves against an all-out attack from another robot faction.
U
Until the End of the World	Epic; Science fiction Drama	Australia; Germany; France; US	1991	1999	A man and woman are pursued across the globe in a plot involving a device that can record visual experiences and visualize dreams.
V
Valerian and the City of a Thousand Planets	Space opera	France; US; China; Germany; Belgium; UAE	2017	2700s	Two operatives of the United Human Federation are sent on a mission to the sprawling space city of Alpha, inhabited by thousands of species from different planets, to uncover an underground destructive force that threatens the entire universe.
Vampire Hunter D	Post-apocalyptic; Horror; Animation	Japan	1985	12,090	In a post-nuclear holocaust world, a young woman hires a mysterious half-vampire, half-human vampire hunter to protect her from a powerful vampire lord.
Vexille	Science fiction Animation	Japan	2007	2077	A female agent named Vexille is dispatched to Tokyo to investigate whether the Japanese are developing robotic technology, which has been banned by the U.N. due to its potential threat to humankind.
Voyagers	Science fiction Thriller	US; UK; Czech Republic; Romania	2021	2063	A group of teenage astronauts sent on a multi-generational mission in the year 2063 to colonize a habitable exoplanet amidst runaway climate change and declining habitability on Earth descend into paranoia and social conflict after discovering that their personalities and emotions were being artificially suppressed.
W
The War in Space	Science fiction Tokusatsu	Japan	1977	1988	Earth is attacked by Venusian alien spacecraft, but a Japanese scientist has constructed a spacecraft that may save humanity.
Wild, Wild Planet	Science fiction	Italy	1965	2015	A rogue cop rescues leading citizens that a mad scientist has kidnapped for use in his twisted clandestine tests in his employer's top-secret bio-laboratory.

== See also ==
- List of stories set in a future now in the past
