= City Magazines =

British publisher of weekly comics and men's magazines

- Founded: 1955; 71 years ago
- Defunct: c. 1974 (assets owned by the Daily Express)
- Country of origin: United Kingdom
- Headquarters location: London
- Distribution: United Kingdom
- Key people: Leonard Matthews
- Publication types: Magazines
- Nonfiction topics: Youth culture, men
- Fiction genres: Comics
- Imprints: Century 21 Publications

City Magazines was a British publisher of weekly comics and men's magazines that operated from the mid-1950s to the mid-1970s. The company's most notable publications were comics magazines based on licensed television properties, including TV Century 21 and Lady Penelope, both of which featured comics based on Gerry Anderson's Century 21 Productions Supermarionation shows.

A number of City Magazine titles were absorbed by IPC Magazines in the late 1960s; the company ceased operations in c. 1974, with its remaining assets coming under the control of the Daily Express.

== History ==
City Magazines started in 1955; its first title was Blighty/Parade, which it acquired from another publisher; followed by Escort, launched in 1958. City Magazines' headquarters were initially at 45 St Pancras Way, London, later moving to 167-170 Fleet Street, and later to Aldwych House, 81 Aldwych, London.

In 1959–1960, City Magazines started a comics division. First, it launched the weekly teen girls' magazine Boyfriend in 1959, which featured a mix of text stories and comics. In the period 1961 to 1965, City Magazine published licensed comics based on the Hanna-Barbera animation properties Huckleberry Hound and Yogi Bear (with the odd Flintstones one-off thrown in).

From 1965 to 1970, City Magazines partnered with Gerry Anderson's Century 21 Productions to produce weekly comics based on Anderson's Supermarionation properties. The Century 21 Productions division Century 21 Publications provided the editors, writers, and artists, while City Magazines arranged for printing and distributing the titles. The Century 21 Publications imprint's most prominent and long-running titles were TV Century 21, later known as TV21, which launched in January 1965; and Lady Penelope, which launched in January 1966. Building on the success of the two earlier titles, in January/February 1967, City Magazines launched three more Anderson-related titles: Candy, TV Tornado, and Solo. The latter title didn't survive the year, merging into TV Tornado in September 1967, while TV Tornado merged into TV21 in September 1968.

=== Matthews era ===
Leonard Matthews, a longtime editor at Amalgamated Press and its successor Fleetway Publications, seems to have taken over City Magazines in early 1969. Along with Alf Wallace, another former editor at Fleetway Odhams Press, Matthews opened Martspress, which took over the packaging and publishing of the remaining City Magazines titles.

In the summer of 1969, Gerry Anderson's Century 21 Productions had become financially over-stretched. Within a few months, the company had disbanded its three warehouse-sized studios on the Slough Trading Estate. In June 1969 the entire staff of Century 21 Publications were given a month's notice. A small nucleus of staff from the disbanded division were taken on by Matthews at Martspress/City Magazines.

City Magazines lost the Gerry Anderson license in early 1970, so the two remaining titles — TV21 and Penelope — lost their Anderson-related content. Shortly after losing the Anderson license, City Magazines acquired the Marvel Comics license (previously held by Odhams Press, a division of IPC Magazines), with some Marvel strips being reprinted in TV21.

In the period 1967 to 1971, all of City Magazines' main comics titles ended up being taken over by IPC Magazines and/or merged into existing IPC titles: these included Boyfriend and Trend (formerly Boyfriend), Penelope (formerly Lady Penelope), and TV21 (formerly TV Century 21).

By 1974, the company appears to have gone defunct; its assets ended up in the possession of the Daily Express (formerly Beaverbrook Newspapers).

== Men's magazines ==
City Magazines started in 1955 with the weekly men's magazine Blighty Parade, a magazine originally called Blighty which had been relaunched in 1939 by another publisher. In 1959, the title of the magazine was changed to Parade & Blighty, and then in 1960 to Parade. City Magazines published Parade until c. 1971, when it was taken over by Williams Publishing, the publishing imprint of Warner Communications.

Similar titles published by City Magazines were the pin-up magazines Escort (1958–1971), Carnival (1965–1970), and Men Only (1965–1971). Carnival was acquired from Liverpolitan Ltd in Birkenhead, where it originated in 1955. Men Only was a publication dating back to 1935, originally published by C. Arthur Pearson Ltd and acquired by City Magazines from the International Publishing Company. Men Only was sold in 1971 to Paul Raymond Publications, who relaunched it as the start of a top-shelf publishing empire (competing with Mayfair as well as US magazines such as Playboy and Penthouse during the 1970s and 1980s). Similarly, Escort was incorporated as part of Men Only and then relaunched in 1980 by Paul Raymond as part of his stable of softcore pornography magazines.

In the period 1965–1967, the flagship title Parade was used in specials with the company's other monthlies: Parade Carnival, Carnival Parade, Parade Escort, etc.

== Boyfriend ==
City Magazines' first comic publication was the weekly teen magazine Boyfriend, which debuted in 1959. Early issues featured a romance comic strip on the cover, whose story continued on the interior pages. Later issues featured photographic covers and the tagline, "The modern young woman's magazine." In 1966, with issue #352, Boyfriend was rebranded, becoming Trend and Boyfriend, and then, shortly thereafter, Boyfriend and Trend (the "Boyfriend" in the title being much smaller than the word "Trend"). The magazine's tagline at this point was, "Setting the pace for the girl with go!" The magazine lasted until issue #428, 9 September 1967, when it merged with the IPC Magazines title Petticoat to form Petticoat/Trend.

== Hanna-Barbera comics ==
In the period 1961 to 1965, City Magazine published licensed comics based on the Hanna-Barbera animation properties Huckleberry Hound and Yogi Bear (with the odd Flintstones one-off thrown in). Huckleberry Hound Weekly ran 283 issues, from 1961 to 1967, with a number of various one-offs and seasonal "extras." (In 1967, the title was acquired by Hayward.) Yogi Bear's Own Weekly ran 75 issues from 1962 to 1964, also publishing a number of specials and seasonal extras.

== Century 21 Publications comics ==
=== TV Century 21 ===
The company's first (and longest-running) title, TV Century 21, aimed at teenage boys, debuted on 23 January 1965; featured strips included Stingray, Supercar, Fireball XL5, and the aristocratic Lady Penelope from Thunderbirds. The rest of the Thunderbirds team and Captain Scarlet eventually joined the comic's lineup. The publication extended its licensing beyond the Anderson productions, as well, publishing strip adventures based on the extraterrestrial Doctor Who villains the Daleks, in addition to adaptations of the popular television series My Favourite Martian and Burke's Law.

The comic dropped the "Century" from its title in January 1968, after 155 issues, and became known as TV21. In September 1969, after 242 issues, TV21 relaunched after a merger with another title, Joe 90 Top Secret. At this time, the issue numbering of TV21 and Joe 90, as the comic was now called, was reset to #1, with a "New Series No." printed on the front cover. While the general format of the old comic was preserved, the Thunderbirds and Joe 90 strips were now printed in black-and-white in favour of the new colour favourites Star Trek and Land of the Giants. The Joe 90 aspect gradually disappeared from the comic, whose name reverted to TV21 after 36 issues (the 278th overall). (Further Joe 90 annuals were published, however, in 1969 and 1970.)

The title sputtered along for another year, mostly based on reprints, including of American Marvel Comics strips. With issue #93 (3 July 1971), the title changed publisher-name from City Magazines to IPC Magazines. TV21 ceased publication with issue #105 (25 Sept. 1971), when it was merged into IPC's long-running comics title Valiant.

=== Lady Penelope ===
In January 1966, a sister publication to TV Century 21 — this time aimed at teenage age girls — was launched: Lady Penelope, which featured Frank Langford's Lady Penelope comic strip (previously appearing in TV Century 21). Billing itself as "the comic for girls who love television," Lady Penelope also included strips based on popular television programs of the era, including Bewitched, The Monkees, The Beverly Hillbillies, Crossroads, Daktari, The Man from U.N.C.L.E., and The Girl from U.N.C.L.E.. Other strips published in Lady Penelope connected with other Century 21 Productions.

After 123 issues, the title was shortened to Penelope; it eventually ran for 204 issues until 20 December 1969, when it was acquired by IPC Magazines and merged with Princess Tina (to become Princess Tina and Penelope).

Lady Penelope annuals began appearing in 1967, continuing for six editions until 1972. City Magazines also published three The Monkees Annuals in the years 1968, 1969, and 1970.

=== Candy ===
After the company's success with weekly comics aimed at teenagers, Century 21 Publications' third ongoing title, Candy, was a "nursery-type" magazine marketed to younger children. Launched mid-January 1967, the stars of the title were Anderson's puppet characters Candy and Andy (the female one being the magazine's namesake). Candy and Andy had originally been part of a new puppet series that had not succeeded in being sold to a studio.

Early issues of the series featured photographic covers of Anderson's puppets; in addition to the main Candy and Andy strip, other strips were based on popular television children's programs like Winnie-the-Pooh, William Timym's Bengo the Boxer Pup, Maria Perego's Topo Gigio, and Associated Television's koalas Tingha and Tucker.

Candy lasted 154 issues — as well as a number of annuals and specials — from 1967 through 1969.

=== TV Tornado ===
Also debuting in January 1967 was the new ongoing title TV Tornado. True to its name, TV Tornado, which was edited by Mick Anglo, featured comics based on popular television properties, including Lone Ranger, Voyage to the Bottom of the Sea, Tarzan, The Saint, Bonanza, and The Man from U.N.C.L.E.; plus text features about Doctor Who and The Avengers. The back story of the Mysterons, Captain Scarlet's Martian enemies, was revealed in TV Tornado. Other strips and characters that appeared in TV Tornado included Batman, Superman, The Phantom, Flash Gordon, the Green Hornet, Magnus, Robot Fighter, and The Invaders.

=== Solo ===
Solo, which debuted in February 1967, also contained strips based on the Mysterons, as well as other licensed TV properties like The Man from U.N.C.L.E. and Sergeant Bilko (a.k.a. The Phil Silvers Show). The title also featured Disney-related strips, including Mary Poppins, Super Goof, and Uncle Scrooge. In late September 1967, after publishing 31 issues, Solo merged with TV Tornado. And in September 1968, after 192 issues, TV Tornado was merged into TV21, forming TV21 and Tornado.

=== Joe 90 ===
The Andersons' latest Supermarionation production, Joe 90, inspired a Joe 90 comics annual in 1968, followed on 18 January 1969 with an ongoing comics series, called Joe 90 Top Secret. This publication did not endure, however, merging with TV21 and Tornado in September 1969 after only 34 issues.

=== Annuals and specials ===
With the success of TV Century 21, City Magazines published a number of related annuals and specials, two of them featuring Stingray. The first Thunderbirds annual was published in 1966, with a new one appearing each year until 1972. City Magazines also published the first TV Century 21 Annual in 1966, eventually putting out five such annuals (with the last one appearing in 1970). A second Stingray Annual appeared in 1966, and two more TV Century 21 seasonal specials in 1966 and 1967. The first Captain Scarlet annual debuted in 1967; City Magazines published a new one in 1968 and another one in 1969.

== Other publications ==
In January 1968, City Magazines launched Go Girl, a mix of comic strips, pin-ups, and text features. The series only lasted 31 issues, however, from 13 January to 10 August 1968. From 1969 to 1972, City Magazines also published Once Upon a Time, packaged by Martspress, which was an educational comic in the vein of Look and Learn, featuring artists like Don Lawrence, Jesús Blasco, and Ron Embleton. (This title also appears to have been affiliated with IPC Magazines.)

The company published Motor Cyclist Illustrated in the period 1969 to 1971.

The final comics title launched by City Magazines was the football comic Striker, which debuted on 10 January 1970. Only the first 23 or 24 issues of Striker included comics content; about 7 pages per issue. Sometime around issue #30, the magazine was acquired by Banner Press Limited and merged with another magazine to become Inside Football and Striker.

== Comics titles (selected) ==
=== Hanna-Barbera ===
- Huckleberry Hound Weekly (283 issues, 7 October 1961 – 4 March 1967; acquired by Hayward)
- Yogi Bear's Own Weekly (75 issues, 27 October 1962 – 28 March 1964)

=== Century 21 Publications ===
- Candy 154 issues (21 January 1967 – 27 December 1969)
- Joe 90 Top Secret (34 issues, 18 January 1969–6 September 1969; merged into TV21 and Tornado to form TV21 & Joe 90)
- Lady Penelope (204 issues, 22 January 1966–20 December 1969)
  - Lady Penelope (52 issues, #1–52; 22 January 1966 – 1967)
  - The New Lady Penelope (10 issues, #53–62; 1967)
  - Lady Penelope (60 issues, #63–122; 1967–1968)
  - Penelope (82 issues, #123-204; 1968–20 December 1969; merged into IPC's Princess Tina; became Princess Tina and Penelope)
- Solo (31 issues, 18 February 1967–23 September 1967; merged into TV Tornado)
- TV Century 21 / TV21 (347 issues, 23 January 1965 – 26 June 1971)
  - TV Century 21 (154 issues, #1–154; 23 January 1965–30 December 2067 [30 December 1967])
  - TV21 (37 issues, #155-191; 6 January 2068 [6 January 1968]–14 September 1968)
  - TV21 and TV Tornado (51 issues, #192-242; 21 September 1968 – 6 September 1969) — numbering continued for one issue in 2014 by Network (dated "13 September 2069")
  - TV21 & Joe 90 (36 issues, #1–36; 27 September 1969 – 30 May 1970)
  - TV21 (56 issues, #37–92; 6 June 1970 – 26 June 1971; merged into IPC's Valiant)
- TV Tornado (88 issues, 14 January 1967–14 September 1968; merged into TV21 to form TV21 and Tornado)

=== Magazine titles (selected) ===
==== Men's magazines ====
- Carnival (1965–1970; acquired from Liverpolitan Ltd, where it originated in 1955; continued by Williams Publishing)
- Escort (1958–1971; later continued by Paul Raymond)
- Men Only (1965–1971; acquired from IPC; continued by Paul Raymond)
- Parade (1955–c. 1971; continued by Williams Publishing)

==== Other ====
- Bliss (2 issues, 1961)
- Boyfriend (428 issues, 1959–1967):
  - Boyfriend (351 issues, #1–351; 1959–1966)
  - Trend and Boyfriend (8 issues, #352–359; 1966)
  - Boyfriend and Trend (69 issues, #360–428; 1966–9 September 1967; merged into IPC's Petticoat)
- Go Girl (31 issues, 1968)
- Motor Cyclist Illustrated (c. 1969–c. 1971)
- Once Upon a Time (1969–1972)
- Striker (23 issues, 10 January 1970 – 4 March 1972; merged with Inside Football [Banner Press Ltd] to become Inside Football and Striker)
