= Century 21 Organisation =

Group of companies owned by Gerry Anderson

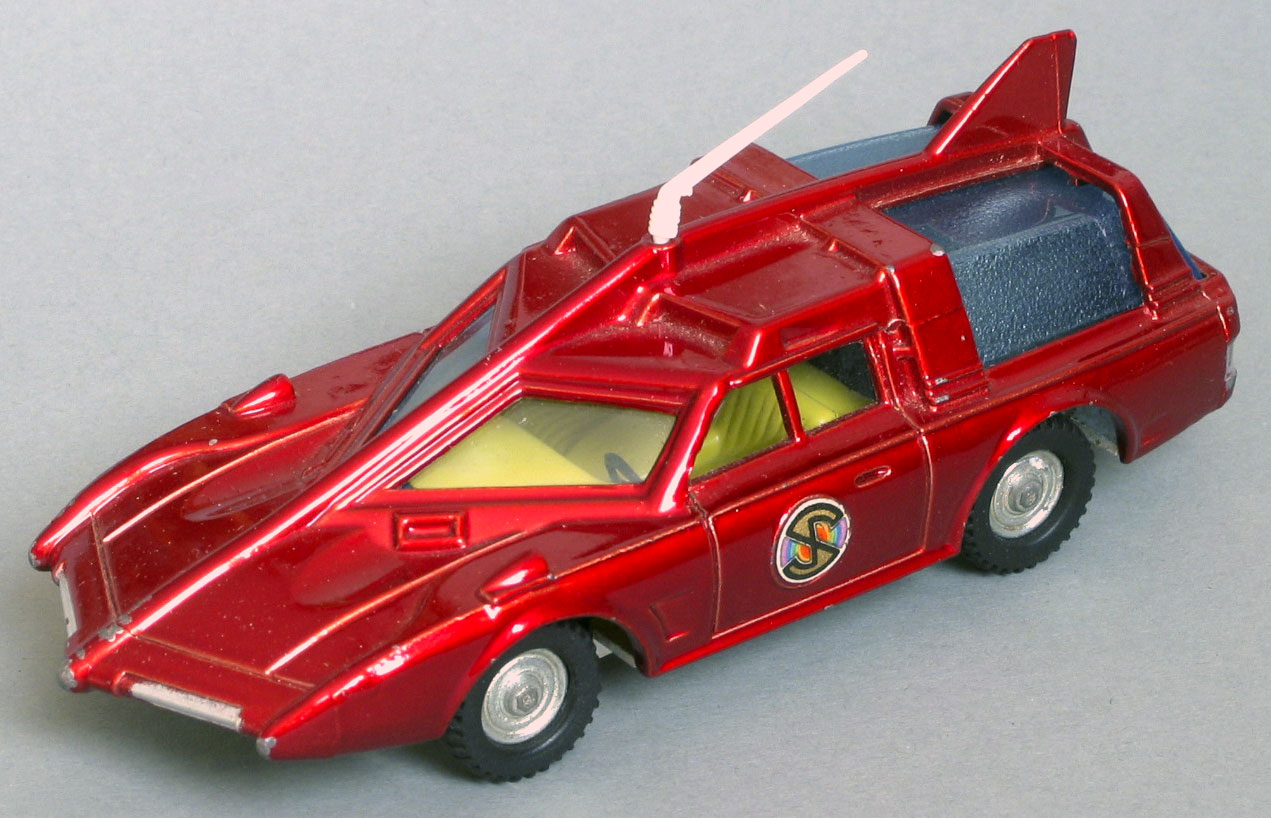
- Dinky Toys' Spectrum Patrol Car (from Captain Scarlet), licensed by Century 21
- Industry: TV & film production; Merchandising; Music & audio play publishing; Toy manufacturing; Book & comics publishing
- Genre: Science fiction; Fantasy; Adventure
- Predecessor: AP Films
- Founded: 1962 (name registered)
- Founder: Gerry Anderson
- Fate: Defunct
- Successor: Century 21 Enterprises
- Headquarters: United Kingdom
- Key people: Lew Grade; Keith B. Shackleton (head of Merchandising); Louis Benjamin (head of Records); Jack Rosenthal (head of Toys); Alan Fennell (head of Publishing)
- Parent: Associated Television
- Subsidiaries: Century 21 Productions; Century 21 Merchandising; Century 21 Records; Century 21 Toys; Century 21 Publishing

The Century 21 Organisation was a group of companies founded by Gerry Anderson in the early 1960s to expand on his television production company, AP Films (APF; later Century 21 Productions). In addition to APF, the group included:

- a property licensing company, AP Films Merchandising (established in 1960 as an APF subsidiary, later renamed Century 21 Merchandising);
- a record label, Century 21 Records (established in 1964) – a joint venture with Pye Records, producing soundtracks and tie-in audiobooks;
- a toy manufacturer, Century 21 Toys (established in 1966) – formed by Century 21's acquisition of J. Rosenthal Toys;
- a publishing company, Century 21 Publishing or Century 21 Publications (established in 1966). In partnership with City Magazines, it created the comics titles TV Century 21 and Lady Penelope, among others. It also published tie-in novels through Armada Books.

Most of the companies' activities were marketing of products created by Century 21 Productions — in particular the TV series Thunderbirds, Captain Scarlet and the Mysterons and Joe 90, although some spin-off media were based on characters and machines from other media franchises, often connected to Lew Grade's ITC Entertainment.

== History ==
The various "Century 21" brands predate Century 21 Productions — immediately following completion and the first TV screening of Thunderbirds, AP Films was renamed Century 21 Productions to align it with its growing merchandising sister companies Century 21 Merchandising, Century 21 Toys, Century 21 Records, and Century 21 Publishing.

By around 1969, the merchandising, toys and publishing arms were under the control of a new entity, Century 21 Enterprises. At the same time, Century 21 Productions had become financially over-stretched. Within a few months, the company had shut down its three warehouse-sized studios on the Slough Trading Estate.

== Century 21 Publishing ==
From 1965 to 1969, Century 21 Publishing partnered with the published City Magazines to produce weekly comics titles based on Anderson's Supermarionation properties. Century 21 packaged the comics, hiring the editors, writers and artists, which were then printed and distributed by City Magazines. The imprint's most prominent and long-running titles were TV Century 21 (later known as TV21) and Lady Penelope; three other related titles — Solo, TV Tornado, and Joe 90 Top Secret — eventually merged into TV21.

Century 21 Merchandising acquired a line of plastic science fiction toys manufactured in Hong Kong, which they marketed under the name Project SWORD. Although not based on Anderson's creations, Project Sword did feature in two series of comic strips and text stories published by City Magazines/Century 21 Publishing. The only Anderson craft made by the line was a model of Zero-X, the spacecraft which first appeared in the film Thunderbirds Are Go. A comic strip series based on the toys appeared in the short-lived comic Solo. After Solo was merged into TV21, a second series of stories — text, illustrated by comics artists such as Ron Embleton and Don Lawrence — appeared. The publisher also released a Project SWORD annual, featuring text and comic strips.

In June 1969 the entire staff of Century 21 Publishing were given a month's notice. A small nucleus of staff from the disbanded division were taken on by Leonard Matthews and Alf Wallace — the ex-managing editors of Fleetway Juvenile Comics; and Eagle and Odhams' Power Comics line, respectively — who were now operating an independent studio off Fleet Street under the name of Martspress. Martspress packaged the relaunched version of TV21 which soon phased out the Anderson-related content.

== Mini-albums by Century 21 Records ==
A range of 37 "mini-albums" (7-inch EPs) were released under the Century 21 label. These were a combination of original material, with abridgments of TV episodes with linking narration, and soundtracks.

Issue number	Title	Series	Notes
MA100	Journey to the Moon	Fireball XL5	Original story. Featuring Steve Zodiac and Venus in 'Project Apollo', with the voices of Sylvia Anderson, John Bluthal, David Graham and Paul Maxwell.
MA101	Into Action with Troy Tempest	Stingray	Original story
MA102	A Trip to Marineville	Stingray	Original story
MA103	Introducing Thunderbirds	Thunderbirds	Original story. A prequel to "Trapped in the Sky", in which Lady Penelope visits Tracy Island for the first time. Intended to acquaint potential TV viewers with the series' premise.
MA104	Marina Speaks	Stingray	Original story
MA105	TV21 Themes	—N/a	Barry Gray Orchestra musical recording
MA106	The Daleks	Doctor Who	Abridged recording of episode 6 of the TV serial The Chase
MA107	F.A.B.	Thunderbirds	Original story. While investigating reports of supposed attacks by the legendary Abominable Snowman in the Himalayas, Lady Penelope and Parker are abducted by a disguised Hood. Features an original song, "The Abominable Snowman", composed by Barry Gray and sung by Sylvia Anderson and David Graham.
MA108	Thunderbird 1	Thunderbirds	Abridged recording of the TV episode "Trapped in the Sky", narrated by Scott Tracy (Shane Rimmer)
MA109	Thunderbird 2	Thunderbirds	Abridged recording of "End of the Road", narrated by Brains (David Graham)
MA110	The Stately Home Robberies	Thunderbirds	Original story featuring Lady Penelope. A series of burglaries at various British stately homes draws Lady Penelope and Parker into a conspiracy to raid the Tower of London and steal the Crown Jewels.
MA111	Lady Penelope Themes	—N/a	Barry Gray Orchestra musical recording
MA112	Thunderbird 3	Thunderbirds	Abridged recording of "Sun Probe", narrated by Alan Tracy (Matt Zimmerman)
MA113	Thunderbird 4	Thunderbirds	Abridged recording of "Terror in New York City", narrated by Gordon Tracy (David Graham)
MA114	The Perils of Penelope	Thunderbirds	Abridged recording of "The Perils of Penelope", narrated by Parker (David Graham)
MA115	Topo Gigio in London	Topo Gigio	
MA116	Great Themes from Thunderbirds	—N/a	Barry Gray Orchestra musical recording
MA117	Space Age Nursery Rhymes	—N/a	Barry Gray Orchestra musical recording
MA118	Lady Penelope and Parker	Thunderbirds	Abridged recording of "Vault of Death", narrated by Lady Penelope (Sylvia Anderson)
MA119	Brains and Tin-Tin	Thunderbirds	Abridged recording of "Desperate Intruder", narrated by Tin-Tin (Christine Finn)
MA120	International Rescue	Thunderbirds	Abridged recording of "The Impostors", narrated by Scott Tracy (Shane Rimmer)
MA121	Thunderbirds	Thunderbirds	Abridged recording of "Day of Disaster", narrated by Gordon Tracy (David Graham)
MA122	Lady Penelope	Thunderbirds	Abridged recording of "The Cham-Cham", narrated by Parker (David Graham)
MA123	Brains	Thunderbirds	Abridged recording of "Alias Mr. Hackenbacker", narrated by Brains (David Graham)
MA124	Brink of Disaster	Thunderbirds	Abridged recording of "Brink of Disaster", narrated by Parker (David Graham)
MA125	Atlantic Inferno	Thunderbirds	Abridged recording of "Atlantic Inferno", narrated by Gordon Tracy (David Graham)
MA126	Ricochet	Thunderbirds	Abridged recording of "Ricochet", narrated by Brains (David Graham)
MA127	Tingha and Tucker in Nursery Rhyme Time	Tingha and Tucker	
MA128	One Move and You're Dead!	Thunderbirds	Abridged recording of "Move – and You're Dead", narrated by Tin-Tin (Christine Finn)
MA129	Thirty Minutes After Noon	Thunderbirds	Abridged recording of "30 Minutes After Noon", narrated by Parker (David Graham)
MA130	Tingha and Tucker and the Wombaville Band	Tingha and Tucker	Features cover versions of The Beatles songs
MA131	Introducing Captain Scarlet	Captain Scarlet and the Mysterons	An adaptation of the first episode of the TV series, "The Mysterons", set during its dénouement, and featuring audio flashbacks with some newly recorded dialogue. The plot concerns Colonel White reporting to a military conference investigating the events of the first episode, surrounding Spectrum's first encounter with the Mysterons and its mission to protect the World President. The story ends with the news that the Mysteron double of Captain Scarlet has returned to life and that the officer's loyalty to Spectrum can be restored with the aid of an advanced computer (a feature of Gerry and Sylvia Anderson's original TV script for the episode, but cut from the final version).
MA132	Captain Scarlet and the Mysterons	Captain Scarlet and the Mysterons	Original story. The World Air Force plane Goliath has been taken over by the Mysterons and is now on a collision course with Atlantic Airport. Scarlet must board the aircraft and destroy it before it reaches its target.
MA133	Captain Scarlet Is Indestructible	Captain Scarlet and the Mysterons	Original story. The Mysterons threaten to destroy the World Cultural Council.
MA134	Captain Scarlet of Spectrum	Captain Scarlet and the Mysterons	Original story. The Mysterons threaten to destroy the Moon.
MA135	Captain Scarlet versus Captain Black	Captain Scarlet and the Mysterons	Original story. Captain Black steals a Spectrum Pursuit Vehicle equipped with one of the organisation's new electro-ray rifles. Pursued by Scarlet and Blue, he takes two children hostage.
MA136	Captain Scarlet T.V. Themes	—N/a	Barry Gray Orchestra musical recording
