= Zero-X =

Fictional spacecraft

- The seven-foot (2.1 m) filming model of Zero-X from the film Thunderbirds Are Go
- First appearance: Thunderbirds Are Go (1966)

Information
- Affiliation: Glenn Field Spaceport; Spectrum Organisation
- Auxiliary vehicles: Martian Excursion Vehicle; Martian Exploration Vehicle

General characteristics
- Armaments: Missile gun (on MEV)
- Maximum speed: 40 miles (64 km) per second
- Propulsion: Chemical rockets
- Mass: 11,460 tons or 5.24 million pounds (2.38 kilotonnes)
- Length: 1,190 feet (360 m) or 390 feet (120 m)
- Width: 780-foot (240 m) or 250-foot (76 m) wingspan

Zero-X is a fictional Earth spacecraft that first appeared in two of Gerry and Sylvia Anderson's Supermarionation productions, the film Thunderbirds Are Go (1966) and the television series Captain Scarlet and the Mysterons. Although publicity material for the various Supermarionation series, and the TV Century 21 comic, made references to connections between the Thunderbirds and Captain Scarlet canons, the Zero-X is the only official link between the two series.

== Design ==
The Zero-X was designed by Derek Meddings, whose original drawing named the craft "ZX 26". AP Films commissioned Mastermodels in Slough to make two scale filming models. The larger of the pair, which was built at a cost of £2,500 (equivalent to £40,665 in 2025), was seven feet (2.1 m) long and weighed 50 pounds (23 kg). The puppet set design of the cockpit was inspired by the interiors of Concorde, a prototype of which the crew viewed at Filton Airfield.

In 2012, the original MEV filming model, minus the cockpit canopy, was acquired by prop restoration company The Prop Gallery, which commissioned the still-trading Mastermodels to refurbish the miniature that it had built 46 years earlier.

== Description ==
The first crewed craft to land on Mars, the metallic-blue Zero-X comprises a number of detachable sections. The main body houses the chemical engines which provide the craft with the thrust required for lift-off and spaceflight. The Martian Excursion Vehicle (MEV; later renamed Martian Exploration Vehicle) is attached to the front of the main body where it serves as the craft's main control centre. During atmospheric ingress or egress, two remotely controlled "lifting bodies" (self-propelled "flying wing" aerofoils) are attached to the main body at the front and rear. A heatproof nose cone protects the MEV during take-off and provides further aerodynamic flow to the vehicle during atmospheric ascent; it is jettisoned just before leaving the Earth's atmosphere, and is the only non-reusable part of the spacecraft.

The lifting bodies act as wings to allow the craft to operate from a runway like a conventional aeroplane, and carry multiple jet engines to reduce the amount of fuel needed for the main body's chemical engines. They separate from the main body when the craft is at a sufficiently high altitude and fly back to base; on re-entry, they rendezvous with the spacecraft and dock with it to again act as wings and provide propulsion in the atmosphere. On reaching Mars, the MEV detaches from the main body, which is left in orbit piloted by a single astronaut, and descends towards the planet's surface. At the surface the MEV extends caterpillar tracks to negotiate the rocky terrain.

The Zero-X has a total velocity of 40 miles (64 km) per second and acceleration of up to 15 g-forces in emergencies. It is built by New World Aircraft Corporation, the same company that builds Skyship One.

== Appearances ==
=== Thunderbirds Are Go (film) ===
The first crewed mission to Mars ends in failure after the Zero-X is accidentally sabotaged by the Hood, who has stowed away on the craft to photograph its wing mechanisms. The crew manage to escape and two years later a second Zero-X successfully reaches Mars. After touching down on the surface, the MEV crew fire on a Martian "rock snake" believing it to be a lifeless rock formation, provoking retaliation by fire-shooting rock snakes. Although the crew escape, the lifting body control systems on the MEV take damage during the confrontation, causing the Zero-X to malfunction on its return to Earth. The craft crashes into Craigsville, United States (roughly 20 miles from its launch site, the fictitious Glenn Field Spaceport). The crew survive, saved at the last moment by International Rescue.

In both missions, the Zero-X carries a crew of five (including two scientists), led by Captain Paul Travers as mission commander. The crew consists of Space Captain Greg Martin (the pilot), navigator Brad Newman, astrophysicist Dr Ray Pierce and astronomer Dr Tony Grant.

=== Comics ===
A series featuring the adventures of the crew of the Zero-X appeared in TV Century 21 (later TV21) comic and its successors, including Countdown. The stories follow the "Mark III" Zero-X as it explores the other planets of the Solar System before venturing into interstellar space. They were written by Angus Allan and illustrated by Mike Noble, and published in TV Century 21 from January 1967 to September 1969. Yugoslavian comic Politikin Zabavnik ran reprints in Serbian.

From 1969, the spacecraft appeared in a line of media titled Project SWORD, a Century 21 Merchandising acquisition. The 1970 Project SWORD annual featured the Zero-X "Mark 101", a 31st-century successor to the original that serves as an interplanetary passenger ship.

=== Captain Scarlet and the Mysterons ===
Recommissioned by the Spectrum Organisation, the Zero-X returns to Mars in 2068 in search of the source of alien signals detected on Earth. The crew's hostile actions trigger a "war of nerves" with the Mysterons. After tracing the signals to the Mysterons' city, mission leader Captain Black gives the order to fire on the outpost after mistaking the Mysterons' imaging devices for weapons and fearing the MEV is about to be attacked. Following the destruction, the crew witness the re-materialisation of the Mysteron city and the Mysterons take control of Black's mind. Black vanishes on the Zero-X's return to Glenn Field, and soon after the Mysterons began hostilities against Earth.

=== Thunderbirds Are Go (TV series) ===
The Zero-X first appears in an episode of the remake series Thunderbirds Are Go: "Signals, Part 1". During its launch, the Zero-X is stolen by the Hood for its lightspeed 'T-drive' engines. Soon after, the engines begin to overload and threaten to create an extinction-level event on Earth. Jeff Tracy boards the Zero-X and initially confronts the Hood, who ejects in the only escape capsule after Jeff tells him the T-drive engine is about to explode. Jeff takes control and pulls the ship up towards space. As he reaches space, a massive explosion occurs and the craft is presumed destroyed. Eight years later, an encrypted distress signal is detected coming from the Oort cloud. Brains manages to decode it, and International Rescue learns it may have come from Jeff. They then search and recover the Zero-X escape capsule, believing it to be the key to understanding how Jeff survived and his current situation. After analysing footage from the capsule, they determine that the witnessed explosion was actually an aftershock of the Zero-X's engines firing at full power and that the Zero-X was propelled at faster than light speed into the Oort Cloud. In "The Long Reach, Part 1", remains of the Zero-X are discovered on a minor planet where Jeff has survived for eight years.

Jeff is rescued by his sons in a new Zero-X called the Zero-XL, which has a very different design: it launches upright like a space rocket and incorporates Thunderbirds 1, 2, 3 and 5 (with Thunderbird 4 held in Thunderbird 2's module), all of which can now operate in space. The Zero-XL has a crew of six, namely the five Tracy brothers and Brains.

== Critical response ==
According to spaceflight historian Jack Hagerty, the way in which the MEV is deployed from the mothership was inspired by both the titular spacecraft of the Andersons' earlier puppet series Fireball XL5 (whose cockpit section breaks off to form a lander, Fireball Junior) and the modular construction of the real-life Apollo spacecraft. He also states that the name "MEV" is based on "LEM" (Lunar Excursion Module), the original designation for the Apollo Lunar Module. Among other observations, Hagerty questions the names given for some of the Zero-X's components in Thunderbirds Are Go, stating that the craft's so-called nose cone "looks nothing like a cone" and that its lifting bodies do not meet the technical definition a lifting body. He also regards the brevity of the Martian landing as a plot hole: "After spending, presumably, many years and billions of dollars mounting this expedition to Mars, all they get for their effort is a couple of hours driving around on the surface." However, he calls the destruction of the Zero-X Mark II "one of the most spectacular crash sequences ever filmed".

Stephen La Rivière calls the Zero-X "the star of Thunderbirds Are Go", praising Meddings' design and acknowledging its commercial nature: "... cynics would suggest that the various detachable segments (wings and nose cone) had less to do with the storyline and more to do with potential toy manufacturing!" Glenn Erickson considers the Zero-X "unwieldy" and aesthetically inferior to Skyship One in the sequel Thunderbird 6 (1968). Fred McNamara ranks the Zero-X tenth in a list of "greatest Supermarionation vehicles", describing it as a "fabulous slice of pulpy retro vehicle porn". He adds that "what stops it being further up the list is its jagged, boxy, rectangular design".

Alasdair Wilkins of io9 questions the design in that it is "not especially aerodynamic-looking". He notes the craft's protracted introduction in Thunderbirds Are Go, finding the film's 10-minute opening launch sequence to be over-long: "It's pretty much the Alpha and Omega of launch sequences ... a sequence that threatens to make 2001 [: A Space Odyssey] look like non-stop, thrill-a-minute action." He believes that with the attention to detail given to the various stages of the craft's assembly and take-off, these scenes constitute "launch sequence porn", elaborating: "It's a bunch of people effectively saying, 'Action? Characters? Humour? Nah, forget all that. We know what the people really want to see, and it's clearly the model-work.'" The Los Angeles Times comments that the launch is presented "with the ritual deliberation of a Greek Orthodox mass", while website Entertainment Focus calls the sequence "meticulous" and "foreshadowing a mechanical ballet which would define [2001]." Mark Bould considers it an example of the Anderson productions' "technophilic model-work".

The Zero-X's modular design has influenced the look of robots and spacecraft in manga and anime.

== Toys ==
The spacecraft's introduction in Thunderbirds Are Go was accompanied by the release of a radio-controlled toy version by J. Rosenthal (Toys) Ltd. Marketed as "Five Toys in One", the product was put together from several detachable sections, similar to the spacecraft's assembly in the film. The remote control could also function as a walkie-talkie. This was followed by miniature models in the 1990s, produced by Japanese company IMAI, and twin die-cast versions – one representing the spacecraft's Mark I and II version, the other in its Mark III Captain Scarlet configuration – by Aoshima Bunka Kyozai in the 2000s.
