= Woman's Weekly =

Woman's Weekly or Women's Weekly can refer to:

- The Australian Women's Weekly
- New Zealand Woman's Weekly
- Woman's Weekly (UK magazine)
