= Mike Noble =

British comics artist

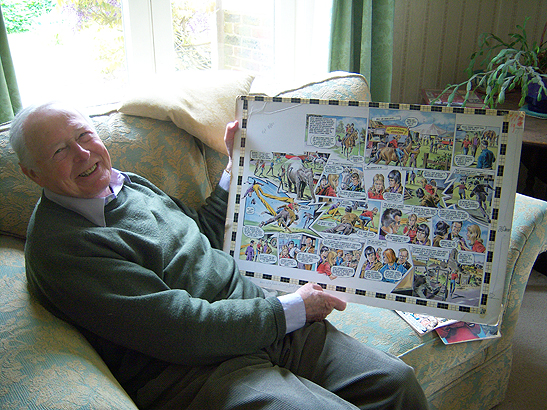
- Mike Noble
- Born: 17 September 1930 Woodford, Essex, England
- Died: 15 November 2018 (aged 88)
- Area: Artist

Mike Noble (17 September 1930 – 15 November 2018) was a British comic artist and illustrator, best known for drawing strips like Fireball XL5 for TV Century 21.

== Biography ==
Noble's father was a stockbroker's clerk who had artistic talent himself. During the war he was evacuated, like many children, but returned to London and endured much of the blitz. After school Michael Kenneth Noble (to give him his full, less familiar name) attended South West Essex Technical College and School of Art where he studied commercial, rather than fine art. At the age of 17 he joined an advertising studio but found the meticulous reproduction of every day objects limited him in scope. In 1949 he was called up for National Service and for 18 months was in the 8th Royal Tank Regiment in North Yorkshire after which he spent three years in the Territorial Army, where his artistic talent came into good use producing graphics of military hardware.

Returning to the same advertising studio he decided to move on and got a job at Cooper's Studio, London in 1950. Noble admits to learning a lot from Leslie Caswell, an artist whose figure work in 1950s romance magazines such as Home Notes and weeklies like Everybody's and John Bull, are renowned. Noble's first published comic strip (the field in which he was active for 5 decades) was Simon and Sally, a strip for the comic Robin (from Hulton's line of children's comics). Noble stayed with Billy Cooper's studio and contributed spot illustrations to national magazines, such as Titbits, Wide World, Woman, Woman's Own, and John Bull as well as the regional newspaper Birmingham Weekly Post.

In 1958 he started a long run of regular work in comics, with the strip Lone Ranger and Tonto (Express Weekly) followed by Range Rider for TV Comic. In 1965 he started work on TV Century 21, illustrating Fireball XL5 in colour and, later, Zero-X and Captain Scarlet. He also contributed Star Trek to the later incarnation of TV21 but the imminent demise of this comic led him to jump ship and follow Alan Fennell (his editor at TV Comic and TV21) in illustrating Timeslip in Look-In.

Noble's use of bright colour made him a recognizable artist for his many UK fans. His work on the subsequent strips Follyfoot and The Adventures of Black Beauty showed his talent for dynamic figure work as well as his ability to draw realistic animals. After a short run of other strips he was asked to draw, in black and white, another creation from the Gerry Anderson canon, Space 1999. Although very capable in drawing hardware (from his work in National Service) he was most happy to be asked to draw the Worzel Gummidge strip.

Noble retired from illustration but still contributed pieces to the Fennell revival of TV21 strips in the 1990s and also enjoyed using his talents locally in illustrating a millennial celebration poster for his village as well as designing a lychgate and stained glass windows for his local church

== Bibliography ==
Sequential comics work and illustrations include:

=== Strips ===
- "Simon and Sally" (Robin, 1953–58) 1 page, b/w
- "Christine, Student Nurse" (Girl, 29 September - 10 November 1954) Single b/w illustration
- "The Lone Ranger and Tonto" (Express Weekly, 1958–60, issues 205 to 293) 2 half pages, colour
- "The Lone Ranger" (TV Comic, 1960–61, issues 444 to 507) 1 page, duotone.
- "The Range Rider" (TV Comic, 1961–64, issues 508 to 658) 1 page, duotone & b/w
- "Little Miss Lonely" (Princess, 1963-64) 1 page, duotone & b/w
- "Beetle Bailey" (TV Comic, issue 659 to ??, 1964–65) 1 page, b/w
- "Popeye" (TV Comic, issue 659 to ??, 1964–65) Front cover, colour
- "Fireball XL5" (TV Century 21, 1965–66, issues 6–39, 44–86, 90–100) 2 pages, colour
- "Fireball XL5" (TV Century 21, 1967, issues 105–108) 1 page colour

A well remembered episode of Gerry Anderson's creation Fireball XL5

- "Zero X" (TV Century 21, 1967, issues 105–130, 135–154) 2 pages, colour
- "Captain Scarlet" (TV 21, 1967–68, issues 158–166, 172–179) Colour front page, 2 b/w pages, 1 page colour.
- "Captain Scarlet" (TV 21, 1968, issues 182–84, 187–189, 194–196) Colour front page, 3 b/w pages.
- "Project SWORD" (TV21, 1968, issues 187) single b/w illustration
- "Zero X" (TV21 & TV Tornado, 1968–69, issues 197–241) 2 pages, colour
- "The Justice of Justine" (Sally, 1969, Nov 1969) 3 pages, b/w
- "Star Trek" (TV21 & Joe 90, 1970, issues 32–41) 2 pages, colour
- "Star Trek" (TV21 & Joe 90), issues 42–57) Front cover & 2 pages, colour
- "Four Alone on the Abandoned Island" (Cor! 1970, issues 1–3) 2 pages, b/w
- "Timeslip" (Look-In, issues 1–26, 1971) 2 pages, colour
- "Freewheelers" (Look-In, issues 16–19, 1971) b/w illustrations for text serial
- "Follyfoot" (Look-In, issues 27/1971 to 09/1974) 2 pages, colour
- "Follyfoot" (Look-In, issues 10/1974 to 19/1974) 2 pages, b/w
- "The Adventures of Black Beauty" (Look-In, 21/1974 to 37/1974, 39/1974 to 44/1974, 48-49/1974) 2 pages, colour
- "The Adventures of Black Beauty" (Look-In, 3/1975, 28/1975 to 37/1975) 2 pages, b/w
- "Kung Fu" (Look-In, issue 7/1975 to 12/1975) 2 pages, colour
- "The Tomorrow People" (Look-In, issue 36/1975 to issue 5/1976) 2 pages, b/w
- "Space:1999" (Look-In, issues 6/1976 to 45/1976) 2 pages, b/w
- "Space:1999" (Look-In, issues 49/1976 to 13/1977) 2 pages, b/w
- "The Tomorrow People" (Look-In, issue 14/1977 to issue 8/1978) 2 pages, b/w
- "The Man from Atlantis" (Look-In, issues 9 to 27, 1978) 2 pages, b/w
- "The Famous Five" (Look-In, issues 28/1978 to 45/1979) 2 pages, b/w Note: Issues 46/1979 to 48/1979 drawn by Keith Watson
- "The Famous Five" (Look-In, issues 49/1979 to 06/1980) 2 pages, b/w
- "Worzel Gummidge" (Look-In, issues 7/1980 to 33/1981, 38/1981 to 53/1981, 1/1982-28/1982) 2 pages, b/w

One of Noble's favourite assignments – Worzel Gummidge

- "Into the Labyrinth" (Look-In, issues 38/1982 to 51/1982) 2 pages, b/w
- "Star Fleet" (Look-In, issues 2 to 33, 1983) 2 pages, b/w
- "When They Were Young" (Look-In, various in 38/1983 to 3/1984) 2 pages, b/w
- "Robin of Sherwood" (Look-In, issues 18/1984 to 34/1984) 2 pages, coloured by Arthur Ranson
- "Robin of Sherwood" (Look-In, issues 40/1984 to 49/1984) 2 pages, coloured by Arthur Ranson
- "Robin of Sherwood" (Look-In, issues 50/1984 to 24/1985) 2 pages, b/w
- "Robin of Sherwood" (Look-In, issues 30/1984 to 35/1985) 2 pages, b/w
- "Robin of Sherwood" (Look-In, issues 42/1985 to 14/1986) 2 pages, b/w
- "Robin of Sherwood" (Look-In, issues 15/1986 to 22/1986) 2 pages, colour
- "Robin of Sherwood" (Look-In, issues 23/1986 to 39/1986) 2 pages, b/w

=== Annuals/specials ===
- "Simon and Sally" (Robin Annual, 1953–58?) 1 page, b/w
- "The secret of the tower" (Girl Annual No.6) 4 pages, b/w
- "Frontispiece" (Girl Annual No.7) 1 page b/w
- "Connie and the Crocodile" (Girl Annual No.7) 4 b/w illustrations for text story
- "Frontispiece" (Girl Annual No.8) 2 pages b/w
- "Bridge of the Brave" (Girl Annual No.8) 3 b/w illustrations for text story
- "The Indian Fighter" (TV Comic Annual 1962) 6 pages, duotone
- "The Range Rider" (TV Comic Holiday Special 1963) 5 pages, duotone
- "The Range Rider" (TV Comic Annual 1963) 4 pages, duotone
- "The Range Rider" (TV Comic Annual 1964) 4 pages, duotone
- Fireball XL5 Annual, 1966 Front cover, colour
- Boys World Annual, 1972 Front cover, colour
- "The Tomorrow People" (Look-In Annual, 1975) 5 pages, b/w
- The Wind in the Willows Annual, 1986 b/w illustrations

Note: Some Look-In annuals & specials reprinted abridged versions of Mike Noble strips:

- "Timeslip" (Look-In Summer Extra, 1974) ? pages, b/w
- "Black Beauty" (Look-In Annual, 1989) 10 pages, b/w
- "The Famous Five" (Look-In Annual, 1990) 9 pages, b/w
- "Robin of Sherwood" (Look-In Annual, 1991) 8 pages, coloured by Arthur Ranson

=== Covers ===
- "Apollo" (Look-In, issue 2, 1972) Front cover, colour
- "Timeslip" (Look-In, issue 11, 1972) Front cover, colour
- "The Tomorrow People" (Look-In, issue 21, 1975) Front cover, colour
- "Thunderbirds 1 & 2" (Thunderbirds issue 44, 1993) colour
- "Stingray" (Stingray issue 8, 1993) colour
- "Spectrum Passenger Jet" (Captain Scarlet issue 6, 1994) colour
- "Captain Scarlet" (The New Thunderbirds issue 80, 1994) colour

=== Magazine illustrations ===
- "Tickled by a tiger" (Wide World, November 1956 p 26–27) b/w
- "The gold of Bat Island" (Wide World, November 1956 p 34–35) b/w
- "Death of a trapper" (Wide World, November 1956 p 40–41) b/w
- "Sally Says" series of spot illustrations (Woman, c. 1957) b/w with ink wash

=== Miscellaneous ===
- Decimal (Various, 1970–71) b/w illustrations for the press trade
- 'Explorer 12' (1987) colour strip for toy range – BHS London
- Piggy Press (1987-1988) colour comic strip for Nat West Bank children's savings magazine
- Fireball XL5 (1990) b/w limited edition art print for Fanderson
- Thunderbirds (1990) b/w limited edition art print for Fanderson
- Nuclear Freighter Emergency (Thunderbirds issue 31, 1992) colour spread
- Tracy Island (Thunderbirds issue 45, 1993) colour spread and b/w sketches
- HOTOL (Thunderbirds issue 57, 1993) colour spread
- Thunderbird 3 (Thunderbirds Poster Magazine 3, 1993) colour
- Canadian Trestle Disaster (Thunderbirds Poster Magazine 6, 1993) colour
- Destiny Angel (The New Thunderbirds issue 73, 1994) 1 page, colour
- Captain Blue (The New Thunderbirds issue 84, 1995) 1 page, colour
- Doctor Fawn (Thunderbirds Are Go issue 3, 1995) 1 page, colour
