= Tingha =

Tingha may refer to:

- Tingha, New South Wales
- Tingha and Tucker
