= Martin Asbury =

British comic and storyboard artist

- Area: Artist
- Notable works: Garth

Martin Asbury is a British comic and storyboard artist, best known for drawing the Garth strip in the Daily Mirror from 1976 to 1997, and for his colour TV adaptations in Look-in.

== Education ==
A page of "Kung Fu" from Look-in, 1970s

Asbury was educated at Merchant Taylors School and at Saint Martin's School of Art, London, and started work in strip cartoons, including assisting Dan Barry on Flash Gordon in Austria.

== Career ==
After a period designing greetings cards, he got work at D. C. Thomson, drawing "Secret of the Sheridan Sisters" for Bunty and "Soldiers of the Jet Age" and "The Crimson Claw" for Hotspur, before moving to TV Century 21, drawing "Joe 90" and the football strip "Forward from the Back-Streets", starting in 1969. He then drew "Captain Scarlet" for Countdown, starting in 1971. When Countdown was relaunched as TV Action in 1973, Asbury got an early opportunity to work in colour on "Cannon". From there he moved to Look-in, where he drew more strips based on TV shows, including popular runs on "Kung Fu" and "The Six Million Dollar Man", written by Angus Allan, until 1981. He also drew three "Doctor Who" serials for TV Comic (a Third Doctor adventure in 1974, and two Fourth Doctor stories in 1975), and a Star Wars strip for the TV Times in 1982.

He took over as artist on the Daily Mirror's long-running science fiction strip Garth following Frank Bellamy's death in 1976, and drew it until it finished in 1997, writing some of the later stories as well. He also drew a biographical strip of Elvis Presley for the Mirror, and "Teach Yourself Tennis with Björn Borg" for the Daily Express. In 1984 he moved into movie storyboarding with Greystoke: The Legend of Tarzan, Lord of the Apes.

In 1994, he was invited to storyboard the film 'Golden Eye', which signalled the resurgence of the James Bond franchise and starred a new Bond in the shape of Pierce Brosnan. Asbury went on to storyboard the next seven Bond films up to and including 'Skyfall'.

He has storyboarded many high-profile films such as 'Labyrinth', 'Interview with a Vampire', 'Alien 3' and two of the Harry Potter features.

In 2012, the Daily Mirror began to re-run Asbury's 'Garth' daily strip in a new format - in that two daily strips were run together as a 'two-banker', thus increasing the dramatic visual narrative.

To date the Asbury strips of Garth are still running daily in the paper into 2014.

On 18 September 2013, he was featured on the BBC One TV 'One Show' and was comprehensively interviewed by Phil Tufnell. In December of the same year, he was awarded the 'Lifetime Achievement Award' by the British Film Designers' Guild.

He remains and continues to work as one of the foremost storyboard artists in the International Film Community.

== Bibliography ==
=== Comics ===
Comics work includes:

- "Zee-Zee’s Terror Zone: One Man's Meat" (writer and artist, Warrior #18, April 1984)

=== Storyboards ===
- Greystoke: The Legend of Tarzan, Lord of the Apes (1984)
- Legend (1985)
- Labyrinth (1986)
- Superman 4:The Quest For Peace (1987)
- Willow (1988)
- Alien 3 (1992)
- GoldenEye (1995)
- Fierce Creatures (1997)
- The World Is Not Enough (1999)
- Chicken Run (2000)
- Lara Croft: Tomb Raider (2001)
- Resident Evil (2002)
- Harry Potter and the Chamber of Secrets (2002)
- Die Another Day (2002)
- Troy (2004)
- Batman Begins (2005)
- Doom (2005)
- The Da Vinci Code (2006)
- Children of Men (2006)
- Casino Royale (2006)
- Wanted (2008)
- Quantum of Solace (2008)
- Harry Potter and the Deathly Hallows – Part 1 (2010)
- Harry Potter and the Deathly Hallows – Part 2 (2011)
- Captain America: The First Avenger (2011)
- Skyfall (2012)
- 47 Ronin (2013)
- Maleficent (2014)
