= Lady Penelope (comic) =

- Lady Penelope #3 (February 5, 1966).

Publication information
- Publisher: City Magazines
- Schedule: Weekly
- Format: Ongoing
- Publication date: 22 January 1966 — 13 December 1969
- No. of issues: 204
- Main character: Lady Penelope

Creative team
- Written by: Angus Allan
- Editor: Gillian Allan

Lady Penelope was a British weekly comic book magazine for girls which ran from 1966 to 1969. Produced by Century 21 Publications and published by City Magazines, it was a sister publication to TV Century 21. Lady Penelope was edited by Gillian Allan, wife of comic strip writer Angus Allan.

The title character was based on Lady Penelope Creighton-Ward, the secret agent seen in the Gerry & Sylvia Anderson/AP Films television series Thunderbirds. Most of the other strips in the comic were also based on popular television shows of the era.

== Publication history ==
=== Background ===
Before Lady Penelope became an independent comic, a strip featuring the title character was one of four colour strips (all also related to Gerry Anderson's Supermarionation shows) to launch TV Century 21 in January 1965. The Lady Penelope strip, created by Tod Sullivan & Eric Eden, ran for 51 issues in TV Century 21, from 23 January 1965 to 8 January 1966. It was published while Thunderbirds was still being produced; the stories acted as a prelude to the upcoming Thunderbirds strip in TV Century 21 (which replaced Lady Penelope when she moved to her own title).

=== Lady Penelope ===
Following the success of the strip in TV Century 21, the Lady Penelope comic, marketed as "the comic for girls who love television," was launched on 22 January 1966.

The title changed to The New Lady Penelope with issue 53 (January 1967), back to Lady Penelope with issue 63 (April 1967), and then to Penelope from issue 123 (May 1968) onwards.

City Magazines began publishing Lady Penelope annuals in 1967, continuing for six editions until 1972.

The run ended with issue #204, dated 13 December 1969, after which the title joined with IPC Magazines' Princess Tina to become Princess Tina and Penelope. (A number of City Magazines titles were acquired by, or merged with, IPC titles in the period 1967 to 1971.) This merger appears to have been arranged hastily and would have left some of the weekly comic strip serials unfinished, so the endings of these were included in the form of text stories in issue #204.

Despite the combined title, only one comic serial from Penelope survived the merge, albeit with the format and main character's name altered. The title would revert to Princess Tina before the end of 1970.

== Notable comic strips ==
A number of strips in Lady Penelope connected with other Century 21 Productions:

- Lady Penelope — based on the secret agent seen in the television series Thunderbirds
- Penny — stories about Lady Penelope when she was a young girl
- Perils of Parker — humorous stories based loosely on the character from Thunderbirds
- Marina, Girl of the Sea — stories about the mute undersea girl seen in Stingray
- The Angels — stories in which the pilots from Captain Scarlet and the Mysterons were the principal characters

Lady Penelope also included strips based on popular television programs of the era:

- Bewitched — based on the ABC television series. This was the only strip other than Lady Penelope's to last until the end of the run.
- The Monkees — based on the NBC television series
- The Beverly Hillbillies — based on the CBS television series
- Crossroads — based on the ATV series
- Daktari — based on the CBS television series
- The Man from U.N.C.L.E. — based on the NBC television series
- The Girl from U.N.C.L.E. — based on the NBC television series

Other ongoing strips:

- Space Family Robinson — original stories using the characters and technology from the Gold Key Comics title
- Class Six Sterndorf — about a special class where young girls are trained to become spies. Created by Angus Allan.
- Creighton Ward — stories about a young nurse, Pat, on a children's hospital ward
- Jenny Ware — humorous stories about a girl who accidentally discovers a chemical that sends her backward or forward in time
- What Did That Dog Say? — humorous stories about a girl who can understand the language of dogs thanks to a magic ring. Created by Angus Allan, this first appeared in Lady Penelope as a text story. It was popular enough with readers to become a weekly comic strip. Later it would be renamed What Did That Dog (And Cat) Say? when the main character, Cathy, gains the ability to understand cats as well as dogs.
