= TV Century 21 =

Weekly British children's comic

- TV Century 21, issue 1, published January 1965

Publication information
- Publisher: City Magazines (1965–1971); IPC Magazines (1971)
- Schedule: Weekly
- Format: Ongoing series
- Genre: Action, adventure, science fiction, spy-fi, techno-thriller
- Publication date: 23 January 1965 – 6 September 1969; After merger with Joe 90: 27 September 1969 – 25 September 1971
- No. of issues: 242; After merger with Joe 90: 105
- Main character(s): Stingray; Lady Penelope; Fireball XL5; Supercar; Thunderbirds; Captain Scarlet and the Mysterons; Joe 90; The Daleks; Star Trek

Creative team
- Written by: Alan Fennell, Tod Sullivan, Angus Allen, Terry Nation
- Artist(s): Vicente Alcazar, Frank Bellamy, John M. Burns, John Cooper, Gerry Embleton, Ron Embleton, Richard E. Jennings, Mike Noble, Carlos Pino, Paul Trevillion, Ron Turner, Keith Watson
- Editor(s): Alan Fennell (1965–1967); Chris Spencer (1968); Howard Elson (1968–1969); After merger with Joe 90: Tony Rose; John Barraclogh

TV Century 21, later renamed TV21, TV21 and Tornado, TV21 and Joe 90, and TV21 again, was a weekly British children's comic published by City Magazines during the latter half of the 1960s. Originally produced in partnership with Gerry and Sylvia Anderson's Century 21 Productions, it promoted the company's many science-fiction television series. The comic was published in the style of a newspaper of the future, with the front page usually dedicated to fictional news stories set in the worlds of Fireball XL5, Stingray, Thunderbirds, Captain Scarlet and the Mysterons and other stories. The front covers were also in colour, with photographs from one or more of the Anderson series or occasionally of the stars of the back-page feature.

The brainchild of writer-editor Alan Fennell (who also wrote episodes of the various Anderson TV shows) and presenter Keith Shackleton, TV Century 21 was produced by the staff at the Andersons' Century 21 Publications, while printing and distribution was handled by City Magazines. Many of the leading British comic artists of the time contributed to the publication, including Frank Bellamy (who drew two-page-spread adventures for Thunderbirds), John M. Burns, John Cooper, Jon Davis, Eric Eden, Ron and Gerry Embleton, Rab Hamilton, Don Harley, Richard E. Jennings, Mike Noble, Paul Trevillion, Ron Turner, James Watson and Keith Watson, and the duo of Vicente Alcazar and Carlos Pino under the pseudonym "Cervic". Initial weekly sales were in excess of 600,000.

Early copies of TV Century 21 are hard to find and attract high prices in auctions and retail. The comic was adapted for the Dutch market as TV2000.

== Overview ==
In contrast with Polystyle Publications' TV Comic, which was a traditional strip comic, TV Century 21 was conceived as a newspaper for children with a front-page containing "Stop press"-style news items and photographs.

The majority of the strips in TV Century 21 were set in the same shared future history. Even strips without a related TV series tied into it; for example, Special Agent 21 was set in the relative "past" and depicted the formation of the World Space Patrol seen in Fireball XL5. The primary setting was the 2060s, with each newspaper-style issue covering the "top stories" of the decade. Earth was depicting as having a World Government – based in the fictional Unity City, Bermuda, and incorporating a President and a Senate – whose authority encompassed most of the planet. Besides Spectrum, the World Navy, the World Aquanaut Security Patrol (WASP) and the World Space Patrol, all of which were seen in the Anderson series, the future Earth also boasted a World Army, World Air Force, and Universal Secret Service (USS).

Elements of these would feature in multiple strips, including ones based on other series; elements of Fireball XL5 appeared several times in the Captain Scarlet adventures. Various textual commentaries established backstories for the characters that also connected the various series; for example, some of the Spectrum officers seen in Captain Scarlet were revealed to be former World Space Patrol agents. This did not necessarily contradict any of the TV series themselves as all were assumed to be set in the mid-21st century at least up until Captain Scarlet; Anderson's final two Supermarionation series, Joe 90 (1968–69) and The Secret Service (1969) had more contemporary settings. (The Secret Service never appeared in TV21.)

A recurring plot element was the fictional Eastern European nation of Bereznik, a country not part of and hostile to the World Government. It appeared most frequently in the Thunderbirds and Lady Penelope strips, usually as an antagonist.

After losing the Gerry Anderson licence in mid-1970, TV21 became a television comic virtually in name only, with the Star Trek strip being the lone feature still related to TV. The publication became more typical of other British comics of the era, featuring a mix of adventure, humour, Western, and sporting strips, some of which were reprints from other publications. Marvel Comics reprints became a feature in the magazine's final year of publication.

== Publication history ==
=== First volume ===
The first issue of TV Century 21 was published on 23 January 1965.

The comic dropped the "Century" from its title in January 1968, after 155 issues, and became known as TV21. In September 1968, after 192 issues, TV21 merged with its sister publication TV Tornado to form TV21 and Tornado.

On 18 January 1969, Gerry Anderson's most recent Supermarionation production, Joe 90, was adapted into a City Magazines spinoff comic, titled Joe 90 Top Secret. The new comic did not endure, however, lasting only 34 issues before it was merged with TV21 and Tornado (According to British cartoonist and comics historian Lew Stringer, "...Joe 90 was selling better than TV21 but lost out to the older title, presumably because the publisher felt that TV21 had more longevity as the name of a comic.") The final issue of TV21 and Tornado before the merger was No. 242, published 6 September 1969.

=== Martspress ===
Meanwhile, at the beginning of 1969, Century 21 Productions had become financially over-stretched. Within a few months, the company had disbanded their three warehouse-sized studios on the Slough Trading Estate. In June 1969 the entire staff of Century 21 Publications were given a month's notice. A small nucleus of staff from the disbanded division were taken on by Leonard Matthews and Alf Wallace – the ex-managing editors of Fleetway Juvenile Comics; and Eagle and Odhams' Power Comics line, respectively – who were now operating an independent studio off Fleet Street under the name of Martspress. With the coming relaunch, Martspress became the comic's packager.

=== Relaunch ===
The new merged comic was renamed TV21 and Joe 90, with the issue numbering reset to 1 (with a "New Series No." printed on the front cover). Reflecting City Magazines' relationship with IPC Magazines, the first issue of TV21 and Joe 90 featured an advertisement for the IPC title Smash! (which IPC had taken over from Odhams Press on 1 January 1969).

The publication's name reverted to TV21 after 36 issues (the 278th overall). With issue 93 (3 July 1971), the title changed publisher-name from City Magazines to IPC Magazines.

=== Merger with Valiant ===
TV21 ceased publication in late September 1971 (issue #105), following its merger with IPC Magazines' Valiant and Smash! to become Valiant and TV21.

Altogether, the title published 347 issues from 23 January 1965 to 25 September 1971 (242 issues before the merger with Joe 90 and an additional 105 issues thereafter).

== Related annuals and specials ==
In late 1965, with the success of TV Century 21, City Magazines began publishing a number of related annuals and specials, two of them featuring Stingray. The first Thunderbirds annual was published in 1966, with a new one appearing each year until 1972. City Magazines also published the first TV Century 21 Annual in 1966, eventually putting out five such annuals (with the last one appearing in 1970). A second Stingray Annual appeared in 1966, and two more TV Century 21 seasonal specials in 1966 and 1967. The first Captain Scarlet annual debuted in 1967; City Magazines published a new one in 1968 and another one in 1969.

== Content ==
=== First volume ===
==== Launch ====
TV Century 21 was launched to capitalise on the popularity of the Gerry Anderson-produced Supermarionation TV series Stingray, which followed the underwater adventures of Troy Tempest and the World Aquanaut Security Patrol (WASP). Stingray strips were joined by Supercar, Fireball XL5, and Lady Penelope Creighton-Ward (from Thunderbirds). (The Supercar and Fireball XL5 TV programs had ended prior to the launch of TV Century 21, but were still being broadcast sporadically on ATV in the United Kingdom. They also had previously been adapted into comics a few years earlier in Polystyle Publications' TV Comic.) Other than Lady Penelope herself, the Thunderbirds themselves were not featured until issue 52, the same issue the Lady Penelope strip left TV Century 21 to star in her own comic.

TV Century 21 extended its licensing beyond the Anderson productions, and for its first two years published strip adventures based on the extraterrestrial Doctor Who villains the Daleks, the early scripts for which had the approval of Dalek creator Terry Nation. Many of the stories were written by David Whitaker, who alternated with Nation in writing Daleks stories for the Doctor Who TV series; however, as Polystyle's TV Comic had the primary rights to adapt the Doctor Who television series itself, the character of The Doctor could not appear in the TV Century 21 comic. TV Century 21's early issues featured adaptations of two other popular TV series as well: My Favourite Martian, with art by Bill Titcombe; and Burke's Law, with art by Paul Trevillion.

Issue 21 of TV Century 21 saw the debut strip of Special Agent 21, i.e. Brent Cleever of the Universal Secret Service. The character had first appeared, in text form, in issue 1, as the fictional editor of TV Century 21; readers were "drafted" as his agents and asked to address reports (i.e. letters) to Contact 21. Special Agent 21 was written by Tod Sullivan and illustrated by Rab Hamilton.

==== Changes between 1966 and 1968 ====
Three strips left the publication with issue 51 (8 January 1966) – Lady Penelope, Supercar, and Burke's Law – replaced the following issue with Thunderbirds, Get Smart, and The Munsters. Bruno Marraffa, who had been drawing Supercar, took on Get Smart, while Paul Trevillion, who had been drawing Burke's Law, was now the lead artist for The Munsters strip.

A new strip joined the line-up with issue 73 (11 June 1966). The Investigator, by Alan Fennell and Don Harley, was about Bob Devlin and Marc Carter, fictional troubleshooters for Universal Engineering Incorporated, builders of the XL fleet, Fireflash, and the first Martian probe. (The strip was not related to a later unsuccessful TV pilot by Gerry Anderson.) The strip did not last long, being cancelled after issue 89 (1 October 1966). Following The Investigator was Catch or Kill, another strip taking place in the year 2066. Originally by Angus Allan and John M. Burns, Gerry Embleton later took over the art chores.

With issue 105 (21 January 1967), Zero-X, by Angus Allan and Mike Noble, joined TV Century 21, replacing The Daleks.

Wright C.H.A.R.L.I.E., a humour strip set in the "Anderson universe" about the inventions of a Professor Wright from the Central Headquarters Atomic Research Liaison for Industrial Experimentation (C.H.A.R.L.I.E.), debuted in issue 107 (4 February 1967). It lasted until issue 131 (22 July 1967), when it – and Catch or Kill – were replaced by Front Page. That feature, drawn by John M. Burns, was a meta-strip set in the year 2067 about fictional TV Century 21 investigative reporter Pete Tracker, who learns about the secretive organisation Spectrum; the strip was used to promote the upcoming Captain Scarlet and the Mysterons TV series (and the accompanying comic strip).

The first new TV series adaptation to appear in a while, Sgt. Bilko, debuted in issue 139 (16 Sep 1967).

The character of the "indestructible" Captain Scarlet, the hero of Captain Scarlet and the Mysterons, made his first appearance in TV Century 21 in issue 141, 30 September 1967, timed to coincide with the airing of the first episode of the TV show. (The back story of the Mysterons, Captain Scarlet's Martian enemies, was being revealed in TV Tornado, another City Magazines publication.) Captain Scarlet was featured on most covers of the title until the 1969 relaunch.

After 155 issues, the publication dropped the "Century" from its title in January 1968, becoming known as TV21. With that same issue, the Special Agent 21 strip changed its name to Mr. Magnet, and the Get Smart, Front Page, and Sgt. Bilko strips were all cancelled.

==== Absorbing TV Tornado ====
In September 1968, after 192 issues, TV21 merged with its sister publication TV Tornado to form TV21 and Tornado. The TV Tornado strips Tarzan and The Saint moved with the merger to the new TV21 and Tornado. This meant the cancelation of the Supermarionation strips Stingray and Zero-X; Fireball XL5, meanwhile, had ended back in issue 174 (18 May 1968).

The final new strip to join the publication's line-up – taking over from the cancelled Tarzan – was the adaptation of the TV series Department S, drawn by Carlos Pino, which debuted in issue 212 (8 February 1969). (Tarzan would return shortly thereafter in TV21 and Joe 90.)

TV21 and Tornado published its final issue, No. 242, on 6 September 1969.

=== Relaunch ===
==== Star Trek takes centre stage ====
With the new TV21 and Joe 90, the publication dispensed with the hundred-years-in-the-future cover date format as well as the focus on the Anderson-universe, becoming more of a typical British adventure comic (the first four issues, in fact, featured association football imagery). According to Stringer, "the content and tone of the merged comic was more like Joe 90 than TV21." The Thunderbirds and Joe 90 strips were printed in black-and-white in deference to the new colour features Star Trek and Land of the Giants. The Saint strip, now titled Meet the Saint, continued from the first volume of TV21, illustrated by Vicente Alcazar; the Tarzan strip returned as well, drawn by Don Lawrence. The relaunched publication for the first time featured strips not related to either Anderson properties or television adaptations, such as the sporting strips Forward From the Back Streets, by Martin Asbury; and I've Got a Sports-Mad Dad; as well as Roy Davis' humour strip The Kid King.

Star Trek, originally by Harry Lindfield, was one of only strips to last all 105 issues of the relaunched publication, eventually being illustrated by Jim Baikie, Mike Noble, and Carlos Pino and Vicente Alcazar, often working together as "Carvic".

==== Losing the Anderson licence ====
Joe 90 and Thunderbirds gradually disappeared from the comic, whose name reverted to TV21 after 36 issues (the 278th overall). In fact, by issue 38 (13 June 1970), both strips were gone, and with them the last vestiges of the Gerry Anderson Supermarionation properties. TV21 no longer had the Anderson licence.

With their demise, TV21 underwent a series of strip turnovers. In short succession, four new strips joined the line-up: the adventures strips The Heat-Master, S.N.O.R.K.E.L., and Danny Merlin Son of the Wise; and the humour strip Micky's Moonbugs, drawn by Graham Allen. (S.N.O.R.K.E.L. stood for Section Nine, Ocean Research and Knowledge Establishment for Learning; Danny Merlin was a fantasy strip about junk shop owner Danny Merlin, keeper of the "Keys of Wisdom.") None of these strips lasted very long.

==== Reprints ====
A sign of the title's failing prospects began with issue 55 (10 October 1970), when reprints began to replace original strips (reprints being much cheaper to produce). First to join the line-up were the American King Features Syndicate strips The Phantom and The Lone Ranger and Tonto. Another, original, Western strip, Butch Conner Sheriff of Dodge City, came along an issue later, shortly followed by The Blue Angels, reprints of the Buck Danny strip from the Franco-Belgian Spirou magazine. All of these strips lasted fewer than ten issues before being cancelled and replaced.

Late November 1970 saw the introduction of five strips reprinted from American Marvel Comics titles. Although the publication had given up the Gerry Anderson licence, IPC did have the Marvel licence, which had last been used to publish reprints of Marvel's superhero strips in the Odhams' line of Power Comics (including Smash!) in 1966–1969. Beginning with the issue of 28 November 1970 (#61), some Marvel stories began being reprinted in TV21. The Marvel reprints – which featured the superhero strips Spider-Man and the Silver Surfer, the Western strips Ghost Rider and the Ringo Kid, and the 1950s humour strip Homer the Happy Ghost – lasted through TV21's final issue.

At this point, other than Star Trek and Spider-Man, the publication called TV21 had no more strips based on television properties.

==== Decline ====
In the comic's last few months, as other strips dropped away, new ones joined the line-up, including the mostly forgettable adventure strips Menace of the Black Museum, The Tuffs of Terror Island, and Wheels Moran; and the humour strips Clancy Clot: Magician's Mate and Cap'n Stardust. Of all those, only The Tuffs of Terror Island survived the merger with Valiant and Smash!

== Legacy ==
Two former employees of Century 21 Publishing, Dennis Hooper and Roger Perry, had worked on TV21 and Lady Penelope in the period 1965–1968. They pitched Polystyle Publications the idea behind a new comic using the Anderson licence. Soon enough, Polystyle's Countdown, debuted in February 1971, initially reprinted many of the Supermarionation strips which had originally run in TV21, including Captain Scarlet and the Mysterons, Fireball XL5, Joe 90, Lady Penelope, Stingray, Thunderbirds, and Zero-X. (Countdown launched while TV21 was still in publication, but when it no longer held the Anderson licence.)

With the end of TV21 in October 1971, IPC discontinued using Marvel reprints. Marvel set up its own Marvel UK imprint, releasing The Mighty World of Marvel No. 1 in September 1972. However, because IPC had the means to publish and distribute Annuals, the first Marvel Annual, published in Autumn 1972, which featured early stories of Spider-Man, Conan, the Fantastic Four, and the Hulk (all of which, except Conan, had been reprinted a few years earlier in the Power Comics titles) was published under the Fleetway imprint – as was the Annual for 1974, issued in the autumn of 1973.

Issue "#243" of TV21 (continuing the numbering of the first volume of the series), dated "13 September 2069", was published in 2014 by Network, with editing by Martin Cater.

== Features ==
Issue numbers before the relaunch (pre-18 January 1968)

- 5 4 3 2 1 Countdown / Countdown – nonfiction text pieces
- The Blobs (#73–89) – half-page humour cartoon
- Contact 21 – activity and competition page
- Corgi Model Club – weekly news article from the makers of die-cast Corgi Toys (with photos).
- Cosmic Capers – humorous text piece with a gag cartoon
- The Critics – brief film and book reviews
- Dateline: 2066 – fictional news stories from the year 2066
- International Rescues – text pages
- Lady Penelope Investigates (#1–51) – text features often used to preview a new comic strip; moved to Lady Penelope
- Laugh-In – jokes and gags
- Mexico Dossier – profiles on players and teams in advance of the 1970 FIFA World Cup
- Project SWORD – text stories with illustrations
- Space Probe – nonfiction text piece
- Spectrum – activity page
- Stop Press – fake news stories from the future

== Strips ==
=== First volume ===
Issue numbers before the relaunch (pre-18 January 1969)

Strip title	Strip type	Original creator(s)	Other notable creator(s)	Starting issue (date)	Ending issue (date)	Notes
Stingray	Anderson universe	Alan Fennell & Ron Embleton	Dennis Hooper, Gerry Embleton, Michael Strand	1 (23 January 1965)	189 (30 August 1968)	
Fireball XL5	Anderson universe	Tod Sullivan & Mike Noble	Alan Fennell, Don Lawrence, Tom Kerr	1 (23 January 1965)	174 (18 May 1968)	Evolved into a text feature
The Daleks	TV series	Terry Nation & Eric Eden	David Whitaker, Richard E. Jennings, Ron Turner	1 (23 January 1965)	104 (14 January 1967)	Based on the fictional extraterrestrial race of mutants from the Doctor Who TV series. Replaced by Zero-X.
My Favourite Martian	TV series	Bill Titcombe		1 (23 January 1965)	104 (14 January 1967)	Based on the CBS science-fiction comedy series that ran from 1963 to 1966
Lady Penelope	Anderson universe	Tod Sullivan & Eric Eden		1 (23 January 1965)	51 (8 January 1966)	Moved to her own comic
Supercar	Anderson universe		Bruno Marraffa	1 (23 January 1965)	51 (8 January 1966)	
Burke's Law	TV series	Paul Trevillion		1 (23 January 1965)	51 (8 January 1966)	Based on the ABC detective series that aired from 1963 to 1966
Special Agent 21 / Mr. Magnet	Anderson universe	Tod Sullivan & Rab Hamilton		21 (12 June 1965)	242 (6 Sep 1969)	The character first appeared, in text form, in issue #1; became Mr. Magnet with issue 155
Thunderbirds	Anderson universe	Alan Fennell & Frank Bellamy	Scott Goodall, Don Harley	52 (15 January 1966)	242 (6 Sep 1969)	
The Munsters	TV series	Paul Trevillion		52 (15 January 1966)	242 (6 Sep 1969)	Based on the CBS comedy series that ran from 1964 to 1966
Get Smart	TV series	Bruno Marraffa		52 (15 January 1966)	153 (23 December 1967)	Based on the NBC comedy series that ran from 1965 to 1970
The Investigator	Anderson universe	Alan Fennell & Don Harley		73 (11 June 1966)	89 (1 October 1966)	
Catch or Kill	Anderson universe	Angus Allan & John M. Burns	Gerry Embleton	90 (8 October 1966)	131 (22 July 1967)	
Zero-X	Anderson universe	Angus Allan & Mike Noble	Jim Watson	105 (21 January 1967)	192 (21 Sep 1968)	Replaced The Daleks.
Wright C.H.A.R.L.I.E.	Anderson universe			107 (4 February 1967)	131 (22 July 1967)	Replaced by Front Page.
Front Page	Anderson universe	John M. Burns		132 (29 July 1967)	154 (30 December 1967)	Replaced Wright C.H.A.R.L.I.E..
Sgt. Bilko	TV series			139 (16 Sep 1967)	154 (30 December 1967)	Based on The Phil Silvers Show sitcom which ran on CBS from 1955 to 1959
Captain Scarlet and the Mysterons	Anderson universe	Angus Allan & Ron Embleton	Mike Noble, Jim Watson, Keith Watson, Don Harley, John Cooper	141 (30 Sep 1967)	242 (6 Sep 1969)	
The Saint	TV series	Vicente Alcazar		192 (21 Sep 1968)	242 (6 Sep 1969)	Based on the ITV mystery spy thriller series that ran from 1929 to 1969. Came over from TV Tornado.
Tarzan	TV series	Don Lawrence		192 (21 Sep 1968)	211 (1 February 1969)	Based on the NBC series that ran from 1966 to 1968. Came over from TV Tornado. Replaced by Department S.
Department S	TV series	Carlos Pino		212 (8 February 1969)	242 (6 Sep 1969)	Based on the ITC Entertainment series that ran from 1969 to 1970. Replaced Tarzan.

=== Second volume ===
Issue numbers refer to the relaunch numbering (post-18 January 1969)

Strip title	Strip type	Original creator(s)	Other notable creator(s)	Starting issue (date)	Ending issue (date)	Notes
Star Trek	TV series	Harry Lindfield	Jim Baikie, Mike Noble, Ron Turner, Carlos Pino, Vicente Alcazar	1 (27 Sep 1969)	105 (25 Sep 1971)	
Forward From the Back Streets	Sports	Martin Asbury		1 (27 Sep 1969)	c. 105 (25 Sep 1971)	Association football drama
I've Got a Sports-Mad Dad	Sports			1 (27 Sep 1969)	68 (9 January 1971)	
The Kid King	Roy Davis	Humour		1 (27 Sep 1969)	68 (9 January 1971)	
Land of the Giants	TV series	Gerry Haylock		1 (27 Sep 1969)	60 (14 November 1970)	Came over from Joe 90: Top Secret
Tarzan	TV series	Don Lawrence		1 (27 Sep 1969)	54 (3 October 1970)	Based on the NBC series that ran from 1966 to 1968. Continued from the earlier version of TV21
Meet the Saint	TV series	Vicente Alcazar		1 (27 Sep 1969)	52 (19 Sep 1970)	Based on the ITV mystery spy thriller series that ran from 1929 to 1969. Continued from the earlier version of TV21
Thunderbirds	Anderson universe	Frank Bellamy	John Cooper	1 (27 Sep 1969)	38 (13 June 1970)	Continued from the earlier version of TV21. Replaced by Danny Merlin Son of the Wise, Micky's Moonbugs, and S.N.O.R.K.E.L..
Joe 90	Anderson universe	Michael Strand		1 (27 Sep 1969)	36 (30 May 1970)	Came over from Joe 90: Top Secret. Replaced by The Heat-Master.
The Heat-Master	Adventure			37 (6 June 1970)	57 (24 October 1970)	Replaced Joe 90
Micky's Moonbugs	Humour	Graham Allen		39 (20 June 1970)	68 (9 January 1971)	Science fiction humour
S.N.O.R.K.E.L.	Adventure	José Ortiz		39 (20 June 1970)	57 (24 October 1970)	
Danny Merlin Son of the Wise	Adventure			39 (20 June 1970)	55 (10 October 1970)	
The Phantom	Adventure	Lee Falk		55 (10 October 1970)	61 (21 November 1970)	Reprints of the King Features strip
The Lone Ranger and Tonto	Western	Paul S. Newman & Charles Flanders		55 (10 October 1970)	60 (14 November 1970)	Reprints of the King Features strip
Butch Conner Sheriff of Dodge City	Western			56 (17 October 1970)	61 (21 November 1970)	
The Blue Angels	Adventure	Jean-Michel Charlier & Victor Hubinon		58 (31 October 1970)	67 (2 January 1971)	Reprinted from Spirou #1607–1627
Ringo Rides Again	Western	Joe Maneely		61 (21 November 1970); 92 (26 June 1971)	80 (3 April 1971); 101 (28 August 1971)	Marvel Comics reprint
Amazing Spider-Man	Superhero	John Romita Sr., Stan Lee, John Buscema, and Jim Mooney		62 (28 November 1970)	105 (25 Sep 1971)	Marvel Comics reprint
Silver Surfer	Superhero	Stan Lee & John Buscema		62 (28 November 1970)	105 (25 Sep 1971)	Marvel Comics reprint
Homer the Happy Ghost	Humour	Stan Lee & Dan DeCarlo		62 (28 November 1970)	105 (25 Sep 1971)	Marvel Comics reprint
Ghost Rider	Western	Gary Friedrich, Roy Thomas, and Dick Ayers		62 (28 November 1970)	91 (19 June 1971)	Marvel Comics reprint
Menace of the Black Museum	Adventure	José Jimenez		c. 69 (16 January 1971)	105 (25 Sep 1971)	
The Tuffs of Terror Island	Adventure	Tony Coleman		c. 81 (10 April 1971)	105 (25 Sep 1971)	Continued in Valiant and TV21
Wheels Moran	Adventure			c. 81 (10 April 1971)	105 (25 Sep 1971)	
Clancy Clot: Magician's Mate	Humour			c. 81 (10 April 1971)	105 (25 Sep 1971)	
Cap'n Stardust	Humour			c. 90 (12 June 1971)	105 (25 Sep 1971)	
