= Lisa & Co =

1981 short story collection by Jilly Cooper

- First edition cover with original title
- Author: Jilly Cooper
- Original title: Love and other heartaches
- Language: English
- Set in: 20th-century Britain
- Publication date: 1981
- Preceded by: Imogen
- Website: https://www.jillycooper.co.uk/books/lisa-co/

Lisa & Co, also Love and Other Heartaches, is a short story collection by English author Jilly Cooper, published in 1981. Based on short works of romantic fiction that were previously published in magazines, there are fourteen stories in the collection, three of which are previously unpublished. At publication the works were described as stories as "frothy" with "a ring of reality", and in 2018 the volume was described as a good introduction to Cooper's works.

== Background ==
First published in 1981 with the title Love and Other Heartaches, the collection is based on Cooper's archive of romantic short stories that were first published in magazines in the 1960s. Cooper described how she was inspired to write them as she could never find short stories by other writers that resonated with her. All the stories in the volume were previously published in magazines such as Intro, Woman's Weekly, Woman's Own, Petticoat and 19, apart from "Kate's Wedding", "A Pressing Engagement" and "The Ugly Swan", which Cooper had drafted in the 1960s but finished for this volume. The collection was commissioned by publisher Desmond Elliott, who had previously worked with Cooper on her romance novels.

== Stories ==
- "A Pressing Engagement" – Hester requires an emergency fiancée and persuades her best friend Nico to step in.
- "Forsaking All Others" – Julia is married to David, but misses the thrill of falling in love, until she meets Richard (first published in Petticoat).
- "Temporary Set-Back" – Jenny has her first job at a publishers and is attracted to her boss, until, that is, he seduces a temporary secretary (first published in Intro in 1967).
- "Sister To The Bride" – Helen meets David at her sister's wedding, as he is reeling from a split with his wife (first published in Woman's Own).
- "Christmas Stocking" – Caroline's brother brings his friend Jamie home for Christmas, but Caroline's paranoia about the shape of her legs gets in the way of Jamie's advances (first published in Intro).
- "The Ugly Swan" – Jessica reconnects with her sister's ex-boyfriend Danny at a party, years after he left abruptly.
- "An Uplifting Evening" – Colin plays around with his boss' daughter, but his girlfriend gets revenge with an artist (first published in Intro)
- "Johnnie Casanova" – Richard meets Gemma at a party, soon after she starts dating his housemate Johnnie (first published in 19)
- "And May The Best Girl Win" – Kathleen is secretary and a new manager joins the company, her colleagues Fiona and Blackie both want to go out with him, but he has promised to never get involved with an employee (first published in Woman's Own)
- "Political Asylum" – Virginia and Jennie live next door to a government minister, one evening Virginia gets locked out of her flat and is invited in next door.
- "Kate's Wedding" – Kate is engaged to Hugh, shortly before they marry they go and stay with friends on a houseboat, along with Kate's ex-boyfriend Tod and his girlfriend
- "Lisa" – Lisa encourage her boss to publish Paul's novel, who asks her out in gratitude and they fall in love, despite this she spend every weekend away and will not explain why (first published in Petticoat)
- "The Red Angora Dress" – Sylvia's brother disapproves of her choice in men, but does appreciate one of their ex-girlfriend's (first published in Intro)
- "The Square Peg" – Penny is a terrible secretary and is waiting for her new boss to fire her, despite her best efforts (first published in Woman's Weekly)

== Reception ==
Upon publication the Manchester Evening News described the stories as "frothy" with "a ring of reality". The Bolton News expressed surprise that the story "Political Asylum" originally went unpublished as it had been considered too controversial for publication in the 1960s. The following year, Denis Kilcommons, writing in the Huddersfield Daily Examiner, responded to the blurb that women would enjoy the stories, with the affirmation that Cooper's male readership would too. He went on to describe this and her other works as "highly readable and entertaining".

In 2018 Red magazine described the collection as a good entry point for readers new to Cooper. Anya Meyerowitz described them as about young women who are "falling out of love and off their heels".

== Popular culture ==
The collection features in the novel Educating Jack by Jack Sheffield.
