= Jean Morton =

Jean Morton (17 February 1921 - 26 May 2012) was a British television announcer. She served as continuity announcer from the launch of the original Midlands ITV franchise holder, ATV. She was one of the four original announcers, the others were Arthur Adair, Peter Cockburn and Shaw Taylor.

She was the presenter of Tingha and Tucker, an ATV programme for children featuring two puppet Koalas, which ran from 1962 to 1970. Morton hosted the series as Auntie Jean. The show's fan club was so successful that ATV could not cope with the volume of mail and it had to be closed down. The Sunday edition of the programme was known for its religious content, with Morton reading bible stories. She was later director of the series Children of the Bible, six programmes presented by Kieron Wood and including a different group of children each Sunday.

Morton was married to Bobbie Daniel. From the early 1970s she lived in Ibiza. Morton died aged 91 in Lichfield, Staffordshire, UK on 26 May 2012.
