= Garth (comic strip) =

Comic strip in the British newspaper Daily Mirror

- Garth as drawn by Frank Bellamy
- Author(s): Steve Dowling(1943–1944), Don Freeman(1943–1952), Hugh McClelland (1952–1953), Peter O'Donnell (1953-1966), Jim Edgar (1966-c)
- Illustrator(s): Steve Dowling (1943–1968), John Allard (1943-1946) (1948-1972), Frank Bellamy (1971-1976), Martin Asbury (1976-c)
- Launch date: 24 July 1943; 21 February 2011 (reprints)
- End date: 22 March 1997
- Publisher: Daily Mirror
- Genre: Action-adventure

Garth was a science fiction comic strip that appeared in the British newspaper Daily Mirror from 24 July 1943 to 22 March 1997. It followed the exploits of the title character, an immensely strong hero who battled various villains throughout the world and in different eras. It was widely syndicated in English-speaking countries. 1960s Australian fast bowler Garth McKenzie was nicknamed after its hero.

== Publication history ==
Steve Dowling and Gordon Boshell were the originators of the Garth character. Dowling wanted to create a British adventure comic strip and took inspiration from the American comic strips Superman, Flash Gordon and Terry and the Pirates. Dowling and Boshell hired 15-year-old John Allard to work on Garth, who stayed with the strip for its entire run. After 69 adventures, Dowling retired and handed Garth over to Allard, which he carried on until 1971, when Eagle comics' Dan Dare artist, Frank Bellamy, took over the art with Allard writing.

Peter O'Donnell, Jim Edgar, and Angus Allan also wrote extensively for the strip during its decades-long existence. Philip Harbottle, a leading Garth expert and collector of the strips, wrote several of the stories during the 1990s. Martin Asbury became Garth's artist after Frank Bellamy's death in 1976, drawing the strip and writing many of the stories until its final episode in 1997.

In 1993, Bill Storrie produced a dozen or so 60-page photocopied magazines titled The Gopherville Argus Special Edition No. 1 featuring Garth as a tribute to the writers and artists who had been involved with the strip.

As of 13 August 2008, "Garth" has reappeared on the website of the Daily Mirror, drawn by the artist Huw J. Davies.

Having successfully worked in the media entertainment industry and printed media for over three decades (including periods at Disney, Warner, and Fox), Davies believed that the re-imagined version could easily cross from the digital, back to the printed medium, and ultimately licensing to other media. This was discussed and the future of the character in print was agreed upon with a new ongoing daily strip in print being planned to run at the end of the second online story arc, "King of New York." However, due to an untimely accident involving long-standing cartoon editor Ken Layson, with whom the agreement had been made, things became muddied and internal politics with the Mirrorpix licensing arm of the newspaper created issues that delayed and inevitably halted this decision.

Davies decided to honour the characters history and under the terms of his licence re-branded the character. Davies, tipping the hat to Don Freeman, longtime writer of the strip, gave Garth a surname in the graphic novel Captain Garth Freeman of the Armed Services. In 2010, this was launched under British publisher Markosia and was a success, selling out at comic stores and conventions as well as online. It was re-published in 2013 by Pummie Productions Ink, at first with its usual format and later with a new cover by Spider-Man artist and Stan Lee collaborator Andy Tong. It was repackaged with the Garth title in honour of the 70th anniversary of the character with all proceeds going to Help for Heroes.

In 2015, it was published again by Pummie Productions Ink, where the character starred alongside Sexton Blake, in the first of what was promised to be a series of comic books, under the Captain Garth Freeman of the Armed Services title. This again sold out.

Davies believes that the online revamp of the character was the catalyst for longtime fans of the character to push for a return of the hero and what ultimately led the newspaper and its licensing arm to re-colour the old strips and relaunch them in the paper.

Garth started a run of reprints in the Daily Mirror, coloured by Martin Baines, in the issue dated 21 February 2011.

== Characters and story ==
Garth's time-travelling adventures lasted for over 54 years and covered 165 stories (plus two additional stories published in the Daily Mirror Book for Boys, 1970–71). In the backstory, Garth washed ashore in Shetland and was adopted by an elderly couple. Garth developed almost superhuman strength and eventually became a naval captain and all-round military genius. Garth travelled through many eras and confronted villains such as Madame Voss and Apollo. His true love was the ancient goddess-like figure, Astra. Garth's sidekick and mentor were French Professor Jules Lumiere, who psychoanalyzed the hero and recovered memories of his previous experiences.

== Episode list ==
- "Garth"
- "Children Of The Dawn"
- "The Island Laboratory"
- "The Seven Ages of Garth"
- "The Saga of Garth"
- "The Awakening Of Garth"
- "The Quest of the 'G' Ray"
- "Garth vs The Brain"
- "Deep Waters"
- "Into The Abyss"
- "Olympic Champion"
- "Wonder Women"
- "Man Hunt"
- "Selim the Slayer"
- "Garth and the Glove Game"
- "Journey to Jason"
- "Space-Time Traveller"
- "The Phantom Pharaoh"
- "Wings of the Night"
- "Space-Time Rivals"
- "Flight into the Future"
- "Invasion from Space"
- "Warriors of Krull"
- "Garth in Hollywood"
- "The Return of Malveno"
- "The Golden Sphere
- "The 13th Man"
- "The Stone of Soloman"
- "The Fantastic Doctor Quyn"
- "The Hand of Attila"
- "The Last Goddess"
- "The Captive"
- "The Sorcerer"
- "The Mask of Chang Ku"
- "Crystals of Camelot"
- "The Big Game"
- "The Living Mountain"
- "The Long Sleep"
- "Warrior World"
- "The Static Zone"
- "When Venus Was Born"
- "The Hounds of Skarn"
- "The Islands Of Kaa"
- "The Troll"
- "The Golden Slayer"
- "The Rebels"
- "The Teenager"
- "The Big Joker"
- "The Time Couriers"
- "The Invaders"
- "The Brain"
- "The Night of the Knives"
- "Lord of The Computers"
- "The Wakening"
- "Wrath of Venus"
- "The Glenoig Miracle"
- "The Time Lock"
- "The Web of Dionara"
- "Mind Destroyers"
- "The Rohan Legend"
- "Playboy of Space"
- "These Men Are Mine"
- "Exiles"
- "Hell Ship"
- "The Brain Voyagers"
- "The Syndicate"
- "Journey into Fear"
- "Sundance"
- "The Cloud of Balthus"
- "The Orb of Trimandias"
- "The Wolf Man of Ausensee"
- "People of the Abyss"
- "The Women of Galba"
- "Ghost Town"
- "The Mask of Atacama"
- "The Wreckers"
- "The Beast of Ultor"
- "Freak Out to Fear"
- "Bride of Jenghiz Khan"
- "The Angels of Hell's Gap
- "The Doomsmen"
- "The Bubble Man"
- "The Beautiful People"
- "The Spanish Lady"
- "The Man-Hunt"
- "Ship of Secrets"
- "Mr. Rubio Calls"
- "Sapphire"
- "Finality Factor"
- "Power Game"
- "The Long Sleep"
- "Voyage into Time"
- "The Fisherman"
- "Mind Stealers"
- "Citizen Mundo 14500"
- "The French Woman"
- "The Forgotten"
- "The Iron Maidens"
- "Legion of the Damned"
- "Make Your Play"
- "Day of Anger"
- "The Space Mods"
- "Seek and Destroy"
- "The Bombers"
- "Hunters"
- "Merchants of Terror"
- "Hammer of Thorwald"
- "Sammy"
- "La Belle Sauvage"
- "Tell No Tales"
- "Lords of Space"
- "Winning Is All"
- "Whose Finger on the Button?"
- "This Land Is Mine"
- "Tigress"
- "Comet of Doom"
- "Return to Thule"
- "Sage of Eadon"
- "Brotherhood of Blood"
- "Vengeance of Venn"
- "Outlaws"
- "Super-Hero"
- "The Great Beast"
- "The Gallant and the Gray"
- "The Don's Daughter"
- "In the Beginning"
- "Body Swap"
- "Beyond The Dreamtime" Script: Angus Allan Art: Martin Asbury
- "Venus Trap" Script: Jim Edgar Art: Martin Asbury
- "Takeover UK!" Script: John Allard Art: Martin Asbury
- "Scourge of God" Script: Jim Edgar Art: Martin Asbury
- "The Doll Master" Script: Angus Allan Art: Martin Asbury
- "Swordsman of Subucus" Script: Jim Edgar Art: Martin Asbury
- "The Chiller Connection" Script: Angus Allan Art: Martin Asbury
- "Dancing Queen" Script: Jim Edgar Art: Martin Asbury
- "Dark Side" Script: John Allard Art: Martin Asbury
- "Treasure at Colchis" Script: John Allard & Tim Quinn Art: Martin Asbury
- "Bedside Manor" Script: Jim Edgar Art: Martin Asbury
- "Apache Moon" Script: Jim Edgar Art: Martin Asbury
- "The Iceman Cometh" Script: Tim Quinn Art: Martin Asbury
- "Hell-Fire" Script: Jim Edgar Art: Martin Asbury
- "Blood Sport" Script: Tim Quinn Art: Martin Asbury
- "Man on the Edge" John Allard Art: Martin Asbury
- "The Killing of Rusty O'Roare" Script: Jim Edgar Art: Martin Asbury
- "Twin Souls" Script: Philip Harbottle Art: Martin Asbury
- "Viva El Garto!" Script: Angus Allan Art: Martin Asbury
- "Return to the Static Zone"
- "Warlord"
- "Champions"
- "Nightmare in Paris"
- "Days of Doom"
- "Twilight World"
- "Stag Night"
- "Devil Woman"
- "Home Run"
- "Sub Mission"
- "Bigfoot"
- "Railhead"
- "Room 202"
- "Mistress Orange"
- "Nasuanna"
- "Sal's Island"
- "The Picture"
- "Dam Drivers"
- "Z File"
- Gold of Ragnarock (online relaunch 2008)
- Garth King of New York (online 2009)
- Garth (Freeman) Death and the Dreadnaught (2015)

Comic Book stories in The Daily Mirror Book for Boys:

- "Garth in Space" (1970)
- "Double Diamonds" (1971)

== Collected editions ==
Garth strips were reprinted as trade paperbacks on several occasions:

- Garth in "The Last Goddess" and "Romeo Brown", Daily Mirror, c.1960
- The Daily Mirror Book of Garth 1975, Fleetway Publications, 1975, ISBN 0-85037-139-2
- The Daily Mirror Book of Garth 1976, Fleetway Publications, 1976
- Garth Book One: "The Cloud of Balthus", Titan Books, 1984, ISBN 0-907610-34-X
- Garth Book Two: "The Women of Galba", Titan Books, 1985, ISBN 0-907610-49-8
- Garth ( Captain Garth Freeman of the Armed Services ) 1st printing Markosia 2010 ISBN 978-1905692361 / 2nd Printing Pummie Productions 2013

Garth has only been reprinted sporadically in the UK, but in recent years the All Devon Comic Collectors Club was allowed to reprint episodes on a strictly for members only basis.

It was announced that Penguin Books India was to issue the Complete Garth in a collectible 5-volume hardback graphic novel box set. This would comprise all 16,000 strips covering the 165 stories published in the Daily Mirror on 3,000 plus pages. The Penguin India reprint would be an Indian subcontinent-only production and the tentative release date was set for September 2009. However, Penguin Books India has now confirmed that the publication of the set has been postponed indefinitely.
