= Petticoat (magazine) =

British magazine

- Editor: Janet Street-Porter, Terry Hornett
- Categories: Teen and young women's magazine
- Frequency: Weekly
- Publisher: Fleetway/IPC
- Unpaid circulation: 5,000,000 (est.)
- Founder: Audrey Slaughter
- First issue: 19 February 1966
- Final issue: 10 May 1975
- Country: United Kingdom
- Based in: London
- Language: English
- OCLC: 751551647

Petticoat was a British weekly magazine for young women which was published from 1966 until 1975, in London by Fleetway/IPC, printed in 40-page issues by Eric Bemrose in Long Lane, Liverpool.

== Publication history ==
Launched by Honey magazine founder Audrey Slaughter at the height of the Swinging Sixties and subtitled "For the young and fancy free" on its original masthead, Petticoat responded to the emergence of a more liberal teenager and young woman. From 9 September 1967, it absorbed the City Magazines publication Trend, renaming itself Petticoat/Trend until it dropped the latter name about a year later. By this time, its slogan had changed to 'The New Young Woman’.

== Content ==
The magazine offered fiction, popular culture, fashion news featuring labels like Biba, Mary Quant, Foale & Tuffin and Bus Stop, and advice on love, sex, healthy eating, hair, and make-up, with plenty of full-colour photographs and Pop style monochrome line illustrations and typography. Petticoat promoted the Mod fashion of 'Swinging London'.

== Controversy ==
From the early seventies, Petticoat's "agony aunt" was Claire Rayner, whose advice on masturbation and promiscuity caused controversy, and who responded:

"Just what is sex education? I can tell you first what I think it is not — and I base these judgments on the letters I handle each year (upwards of 5,000 of them) from the adolescents who write to Petticoat magazine."

== Significant contributors ==
Other Petticoat contributors included Annie Nightingale, Maggie Goodman, Lynne Franks (supposedly the model for Edina, played by Jennifer Saunders, in the TV series Absolutely Fabulous), Jane Ennis, Chris Ward (later editor of the Daily Express), Eve Pollard (who later edited the Sunday Mirror and the Sunday Express before launching Aura) and Janet Street-Porter who was appointed editor in 1967 and who had close links to the designer Zandra Rhodes amongst others. One of the contributors of romantic short stories in the 1960s was author Jilly Cooper; some of these were anthologised in 1981 in Lisa & Co.

== Demise ==
With the format of a cheaper supermarket tabloid, and as television continued making inroads into the magazine market, Petticoat's lifespan mirrored that of more stylish competitors of the time, including Biba and Nova magazines (which both folded in 1975): Petticoat was absorbed by Hi! on 17 May 1975, which in turn was merged with O.K. magazine on 10 July 1976.
