= Short-story collection =

Book of several short stories

A short-story collection is a book of short stories and/or novellas by a single author. A short story collection is distinguished from an anthology of fiction, which would contain work by several authors (e.g., Les Soirées de Médan). The stories in a collection may or may not share a tone, theme, setting, or characters with one another.

== Composition of a collection ==
Short-story collections are made up of smaller texts—the individual short stories—to form a superior whole. In spite of this, each short story does not lose any of its meaning or narrative independence by being included in a collection. This does not mean that short stories do not gain any new meaning from being included in a collection, though. Because each story's context has changed, surrounded by other stories with their own meanings and tones, the meaning and tone of any individual story might also be affected. In addition to the individual stories, short-story collections may also include notes by the author.

The act of writing short stories is different from the act of gathering short stories into a collection. For instance, the short-story author may or may not be the one who compiles the short-story collection, even though the author penned the individual stories. This is especially obvious in the case of posthumous publications.

Note that short-story collections should be considered different from traditional novels and other narratives because collections do not forward a cohesive storyline in the same way novels do. Instead, short-story collections group individual pieces, each with their own narratives. If a short-story collection as a whole has its own narrative, it is considered a short-story cycle.

== History of short-story collections ==
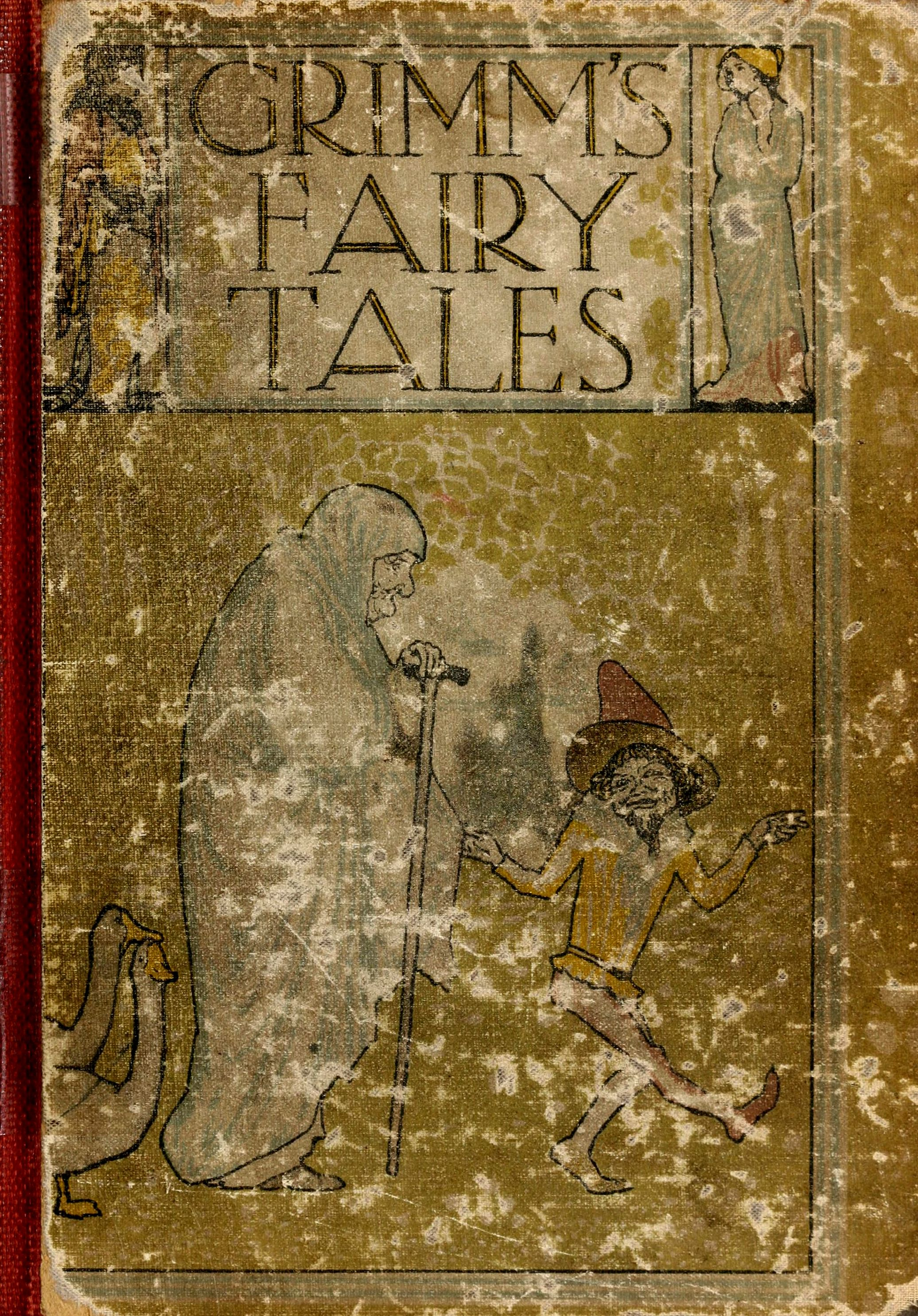
Grimm's Fairy Tales

Short-story collections have their roots in medieval frame tale collections, growing into the postmodern narratives of the 1900s. Short-story collections either can be authored traditionally by one person or evolve from oral, anonymous traditions that are finally penned by someone. An example of the latter would be Grimm's Fairy Tales. Short story collections can be published when the author is alive or they can be collected and published after the author is dead using the author's existing works.

Early Western short-story collections include Marie of France's Lais and Giovanni Boccaccio's Decameron.

== Uses for short-story collections ==
From the producer's side, short-story collections are helpful economically to authors looking to publish. Because short stories are often less than 50 pages long, putting them together can provide something that is more like the size of a novel. While short story collections are less popular than novels for consumers, they are purchased consistently. Short story collections have experienced a gradual increase in sales over the last decade, although most collections are not reprinted and do not sell more than 3,000 copies.

Aside from their entertainment value, short-story collections can also be used for teaching. There are several potential applications for collections in the classroom. The first is the ability for students to quickly experience other cultures and traditions through a literary lens. Secondly, providing short-story collections centered around a specific time creates an opportunity to encourage interest in historical studies. Teachers can also use short-story collections as introduction or further exploration to a genre. By providing several works from that genre, students can get a feel of its conventions. Another potential use is to challenge students to evaluate and criticize literature by using short-story collections as a jumping off point. The last idea is to use short story collections as a model for student writing since classical greats can be daunting or impossible for a student to replicate. But newer, more bite-sized short story collections might be a good way for students to get the depth of exposure they need while not overwhelming them.

== Notable short story collections ==
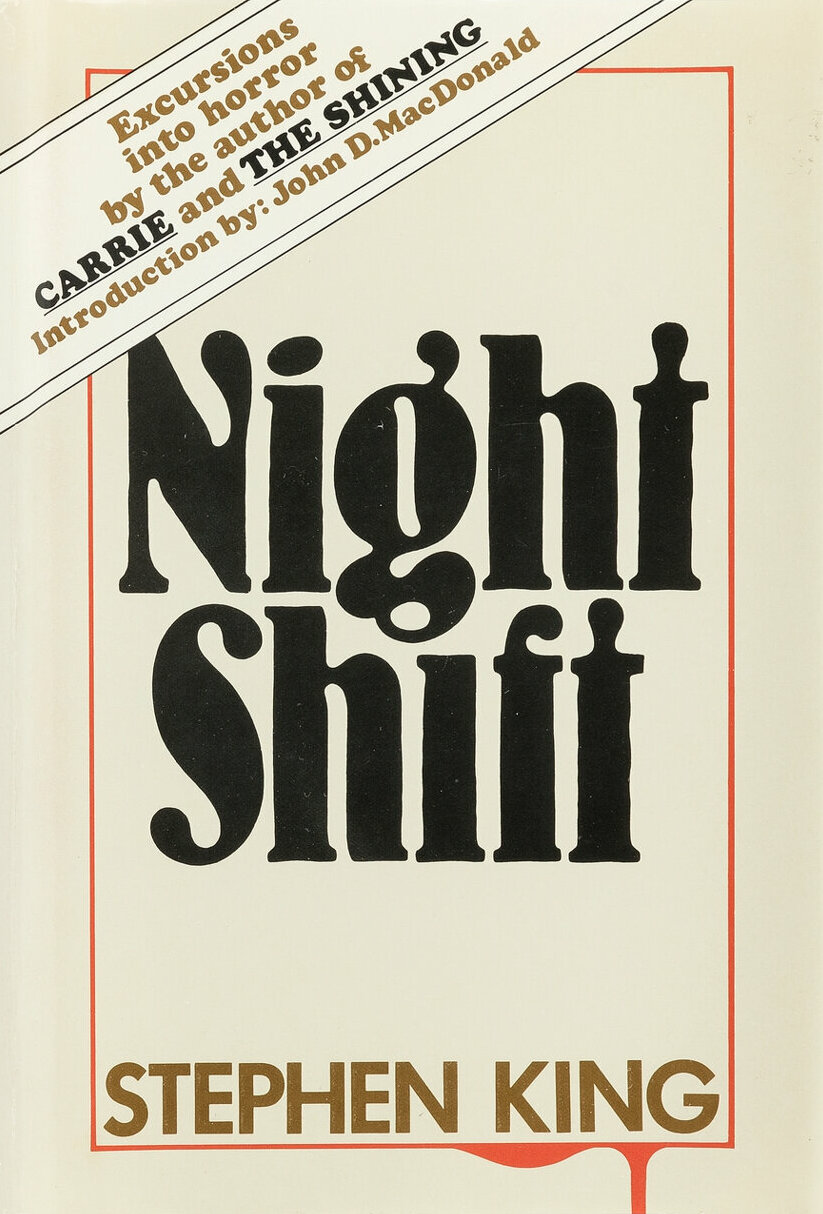
A book cover of Night Shift (1978), the first published short story collection by Stephen King

Short-story collections can be divided into two general groups. The first is themed collections, which might share a character, setting, theme, or tone. This is different from a short story cycle in that the collection does not advance a cohesive narrative. The second is non-themed collections, a grouping in which each story has little literary similarity to the others. Following are notable collections from each group.

=== Themed collections ===
- Grimm's Fairy Tales by Jakob and Wilhelm Grimm
- Dubliners by James Joyce
- Her Body and Other Parties by Carmen Maria Machado
- The Moons of Jupiter by Alice Munro
- Nine Stories by J.D. Salinger
- What We Talk About When We Talk About Love by Raymond Carver
- Brief Interviews with Hideous Men by David Foster Wallace
- Les Mille et un jours by François Pétis de la Croix
- Cambridge Songs by Goliards
- Carmina Burana
- Lisa & Co by Jilly Cooper
- The Canterbury Tales by Geoffrey Chaucer

=== Non-themed collections ===
- The Garden Party and Other Stories by Katherine Mansfield
- Ficciones and El Aleph by Jorge Luis Borges
- The Collected Stories by Ernest Hemingway
- Nightfall and Other Stories by Isaac Asimov
