= Woman's Own =

British lifestyle magazine aimed at women

- Cover of 30 September 2024 issue
- Editor: Kira Agass
- Frequency: Weekly
- Circulation: 226,116 (ABC Jul – Dec 2013); Print and digital editions.
- Founded: 1932
- Company: Future plc
- Country: United Kingdom
- Language: English
- Website: www.womansown.co.uk

Woman's Own is a British lifestyle magazine aimed at women. It began in 1932 and at one time it was said to be "perhaps the most influential woman’s magazine in the English speaking world". It campaigned to change government policy and spoke out on taboo subjects.

== History ==
Woman's Own was first published in 1932 by Newnes. In its early years it placed women's rights and social problems firmly in the foreground. Its first "agony aunt" was Leonora Eyles. One of the contributors of romantic short stories in the 1960s was author Jilly Cooper; some of these were anthologised in 1981 in Lisa & Co.

In Jane Reed began her decade as editor. In 1973 the magazine created "Children of Courage" which recognises children who have shown heroism, endured pain or disability. The idea was still running 50 years later.

Woman's Own became a significant fund raiser for Save the Children. They started what became an annual event with the "world’s biggest jumble sale" attracting donations in one year that included a pair of Peter Sellers silk pyjamas and a dress worn by Sophia Loren.

In 1979, Jane Reed was moving on from being editor. The magazine was being described as "perhaps the most influential woman’s magazine in the English speaking world". Under her leadership the magazine had campaigned for Plain English and for women to have equal taxes to men. They had discussed how to examine your own breasts for cancer and given instructions as to how a woman, in extremis, could give birth alone.

When Margaret Thatcher came to power in 1979 the magazine was campaigning to have supervision for children after school and during school holidays to support working women. It was recognised that this was not supported by the new government.

In 1987, Margaret Thatcher gave an interview to journalist Douglas Keay in which she gave her opinion of individual and governmental responsibility, usually reduced to the comment: "There is no such thing as society".

The magazine sponsors an annual Children of Courage Award, first launched in 1973,

The magazine in the new millennium was troubled with a succession of editorial makeovers, relaunches and sudden departures. The magazine was left without an editor for five months from September 2006, following the abrupt resignation of Elsa McAlonan, just a few months after her second revamp of the title during her four years in charge. In 2007, Karen Livermore was brought in from Family Circle, another magazine within the IPC stable. Her £2 million facelift failed to stem a long-term slide in circulation that saw weekly sales slipping towards 340,000 by the end of 2007, down from 450,000 in 2005 and well behind the market leader, Take a Break, circulation over 1 million.

In 2008, the accuracy of the magazine's health and medical reporting was the subject of a Press Complaints Commission enquiry with its journalistic ethics and its treatment of case studies questioned in the mainstream press. ("Jackie's tale sets alarm bells ringing: how Woman's Own sexed up Addison's disease for its own ends.").
