= Woman's Weekly (UK magazine) =

Magazine

- Cover of 22 October 2024 issue
- Editor: Geoffrey Palmer
- Categories: Mature women's weekly magazine
- Frequency: Weekly (Wednesday)
- Circulation: 236,429 (ABC Jun – Dec 2018); Print and digital editions.
- Founded: 1911
- Company: Future plc
- Country: UK
- Based in: London
- Language: English
- Website: www.womansweekly.com
- ISSN: 0043-7417

Woman's Weekly is a British women's magazine published by Future plc and edited by Geoffrey Palmer. On sale every Wednesday, Woman's Weekly sells over 240,000 copies per week.

== Background ==
The magazine was launched in 1911 by Amalgamated Press. Woman's Weekly Woman's Weekly focuses on the home, family and lives of grown-up women, providing them with health advice and hints on how to feel good. One of the contributors in the 1960s was Jilly Cooper, who wrote romantic short stories for the publication, some of which were later anthologised as Lisa & Co.

Woman's Weekly aims to inspire readers to be creative with cookery, home, gardening and craft ideas. Each week also features a fiction story and generally upbeat real-life stories.

On 4 November 2011 the magazine celebrated its 100th anniversary with a facsimile re-publication of the first edition. Discussing the longevity of the magazine, on the BBC Radio 4's Today programme, then editor Diane Kenwood and social historian Dr Clare Rose explained that the magazine had been launched in 1911 to appeal to the growing class of office-employed women who sought a magazine for reading on their daily commute by train, tram and bus.

== Payment terms ==
In June 2018 writer Tara Westgate alleged that Woman's Weekly had cut its payment for short stories by one third (from £150 per 2,000 word story to £100) and required all rights including moral rights (ie the right to be identified as the author of the story) in return for this payment. Carol Bevitt wrote an article on the subject for Writing magazine in the 2 August issue, while Joanne Harris blogged and Tweeted on the story.

== Woman's Weekly Library ==
From 1962, the magazine published individual stories or novellas in a small format each month. In 1971, ten titles were published each month. The stories were 30,000 words each. Later, the sub-group of hospital romances alone amounted to eight publications a month.
