= Angus Allan =

British comic strip writer

- Born: Angus Peter Allan; 22 July 1936 Wimbledon, London, UK
- Died: 16 July 2007 (aged 70) France
- Areas: Writer, Editor

Angus Peter Allan (22 July 1936 – 16 July 2007) was a British comic strip writer and magazine editor who worked on TV Century 21 in the 1960s and Look-in magazine during the 1970s. Most commonly known as Angus Allan and sometimes credited as Angus P. Allan, he was responsible for original comic strip adaptations of numerous popular TV series.

Allan's output was prolific, and nearly all the Look-in comic strips were his creations. Some of his comic works included The Six Million Dollar Man, Logan's Run and Charlie's Angels. He collaborated with many well-known comic strip artists, including Jim Baikie and Arthur Ranson.

== Life and career ==
Allan was born in Wimbledon, on 22 July 1936 and attended King's College School. His first job in publishing, in late 1952, was as an office junior at Amalgamated Press (later Fleetway, then IPC). He worked on the weekly comic The Comet, and the monthly titles Cowboy Comics and Super Detective Library, edited by Ted Holmes.

Following a period of national service in the Gordon Highlanders from November 1954 to November 1956, having been on active service in Cyprus, Allan returned to Amalgamated Press and after working on Super Detective Library, eventually became co-editor of what was now known as "Cowboy Picture Library", with Alan Fennell. He handled the Davy Crockett and Kansas Kid monthly titles. Eventually, he was recruited to join the team producing Marty, the first photo-strip teenage romance weekly published by Newnes and Pearson. Here he met his future wife, Gillian, and made the decision to become a freelance writer instead of editing. He remained a freelance thereafter.

Later, he was heavily involved with Alan Fennell's Century 21 Publishing company, becoming associated with Gerry Anderson classics such as Stingray and Thunderbirds. He was also the mainstay scriptwriter for Fennell's Look-in magazine, devising strips based on The Six Million Dollar Man, Logan's Run, Charlie's Angels and Danger Mouse.

Allan wrote the novelisation of the film Thunderbirds Are Go, as well as a novel of Dan Dare (NEL 1977). He penned several of the Garth adventures for the Daily Mirror. He also wrote for other outlets.

In 1990, Allan and his wife moved to France. He died of cancer on 16 July 2007, having been admitted to hospital a few days earlier.
