= Tingha and Tucker =

Children's television characters

Tingha & Tucker badge

Tingha and Tucker were children's television characters on Britain's ITV network from 1962 until 1970. The series was made by Associated Television (ATV), the independent ITV station which made programmes in the Midlands. Generally, the show followed a format of short weekday shows, with a Sunday special each week called The Tree House Family.

== History ==
Originally, Tingha and Tucker were simply stuffed toy koalas belonging to host Jean Morton, who would speak to them on air. Soon, puppets were made of the characters so that they could be more lifelike. The show was a great success and like many shows of its era had a "club", the Tingha and Tucker Club, which at its height had 750,000 members. The club eventually had to close when it became unable to handle the volume of mail it generated. One of the favourite show songs was "The Wibbly Wobbly Way".

The show was eventually cancelled in 1970 after eight years. The Tingha and Tucker puppets used on air were reportedly stolen from storage shortly after and have never been recovered.

== Characters ==
- "Auntie Jean" - Jean Morton, the show's host
- Tingha and Tucker - koalas
- Willie Wombat
- Grandpa Wombat
- Kiki Kangaroo
- Katie Kookaburra
- Ermintrude Emu
- Postman Pete Murray (disc jockey)
- "Uncle Pat" - Pat Astley, the ATV continuity announcer
- "Uncle Cliff Richard" - Cliff Richard.

== Merchandise ==
Like many British television shows, Tingha and Tucker had an annual children's book release, with a volumes issued each year between 1967 and 1971. Other book releases included a "Bedtime Book" in 1967 and several records were released as well, such as the 1964 Pye Records 7" single "Woomerang Boomerang" b/w "Over the Rickety Bridge". Century 21 Records released an LP (Catalogue A5) called the Tingha and Tucker Club Song Book. A somewhat stranger record release from Century 21, a "mini album" called Tingha and Tucker present the New Wombaville Band, included the puppet characters covering several Beatles songs.

== Theme tune and background information ==
- The theme song was written by Tony Hatch, known as the composer of television theme tunes such as Crossroads and Neighbours and Emmerdale.
- Tingha's name is a reference to the town of Tingha, New South Wales. The town in turn gets its name from an aboriginal word meaning "a flat, open land."
- Despite many references to bears, including the motto and songs, koalas are not related to bears at all but are, in fact, marsupials.
