= Fireball XL5 =

British children's science fiction TV series (1962–1963)

- Genre: Children's science fiction
- Created by: Gerry and Sylvia Anderson
- Written by: Gerry and Sylvia Anderson; Alan Fennell; Anthony Marriott; Dennis Spooner
- Directed by: Gerry Anderson; David Elliott; Bill Harris; John Kelly; Alan Pattillo
- Voices of: David Graham; Sylvia Anderson; Paul Maxwell; John Bluthal; Gerry Anderson
- Music by: Barry Gray
- Ending theme: "Fireball", performed by Don Spencer
- Country of origin: United Kingdom
- Original language: English
- No. of series: 1
- No. of episodes: 39

Production
- Producer: Gerry Anderson
- Cinematography: John Read; Ian Struthers
- Editors: Gordon Davie; Eric Pask; David Lane
- Running time: 25 minutes
- Production company: AP Films in association with ATV

Original release
- Network: ITV
- Release: 28 October 1962 – 27 October 1963

Fireball XL5 is a 1960s British puppet science fiction television series about the missions of Fireball XL5, a vessel of the World Space Patrol that polices the cosmos in the year 2062. Commanded by Colonel Steve Zodiac, XL5 defends Earth from interstellar threats while encountering a wide variety of alien civilisations.

Inspired by the Space Race, Fireball XL5 was created by the husband-and-wife team of Gerry and Sylvia Anderson and filmed by their production company AP Films (APF) for ITC Entertainment. It was APF's final black-and-white series and the third to be made in what the Andersons dubbed "Supermarionation": a style of production in which the characters were played by electronic marionettes whose mouth movements were synchronised with the voice actors' pre-recorded dialogue. Zodiac was voiced by Paul Maxwell while two of his companions – XL5 co-pilot Robert the Robot and "space doctor" Venus – were voiced by Gerry and Sylvia Anderson themselves. The series' scale model special effects were directed by Derek Meddings.

Filming of Fireball XL5's 39 half-hour episodes began in February 1962 and the series premiered on ATV London (part of the ITV network) on 28 October that year. It was also purchased by NBC in the United States, becoming the only Anderson series to air on an American network, as opposed to being syndicated. The TV episodes were supplemented by an audio play, comic strips in TV Comic and TV Century 21, and other tie-ins including books, toys and model kits. The series was regularly repeated on British TV until 1974 and has since been released on DVD in the UK, US, Canada and Australia.

In June 2023 the British free-to-air vintage film and nostalgia television channel Talking Pictures TV commenced a rerun of the series on Saturday afternoons. Whilst in the United States the series, along with other Anderson Supermarionation series, has been shown intermittently on MeTV Toons since 25 June 2024. As of 2026, the full series is available on Amazon Prime Video.

Regarded by some commentators as a space opera or space Western, Fireball XL5 has been praised for its music; its closing theme – "Fireball", sung by Don Spencer – was commercially released to moderate success in the UK charts. It is often confused with Space Patrol, a marionette series with a similar premise that was made by the Andersons' former collaborators Roberta Leigh and Arthur Provis.

== Premise ==
Set in the year 2062, the series follows the missions of Earth spaceship Fireball XL5, commanded by Colonel Steve Zodiac of the World Space Patrol (WSP). Zodiac's crew comprises Dr Venus, an authority on space medicine; engineer and navigator Professor Matthew Matic; and co-pilot Robert: a transparent, anthropomorphic robot who often exclaims "ON-OUR-WAY-'OME!" as XL5 returns to base.

XL5 patrols Sector 25 of charted interstellar space and is one of at least 30 "Fireball XL" vessels (an XL30 is mentioned in the episode "The Firefighters"). The ship has a "gravity activator" for artificial gravity and consists of two detachable sections. A winged nose cone dubbed Fireball Junior houses the cockpit and serves as a self-contained short take-off and vertical landing craft for exploring planets. The main, larger section contains a navigation bay, laboratory, workshops, lounge and crew quarters, together with the rocket motors that enable interstellar travel. On arrival at an alien world, the main section usually remains in orbit while Fireball Junior travels down to the surface.

The WSP is based at Space City, located on an unnamed island in the South Pacific Ocean. The organisation is headed by Commander Zero, assisted by Lieutenant Ninety. For unspecified reasons, the city's 25-storey, T-shaped control tower rotates (in one episode ("Dangerous Cargo"), a character (Zoonie the Lazoon) accidentally causes it to turn fast enough for those inside to suffer vertigo).

XL5's deep-space patrols are missions of three months' duration; between missions, the ship is on call at Space City. The ship blasts off from a mile-long launch rail ending in a 40-degree incline. On its return to Space City, it lands vertically in a horizontal attitude using underside-mounted retro-rockets.

Until the episode "Faster Than Light", XL5 travels through space at sub-light speeds. Its rocket motors, powered by a "nutomic" reactor, provide a maximum safe speed of "Space Velocity 7", allowing the ship to reach the outlying star systems of charted space within a few months. The crew do not wear spacesuits outside the ship: instead, they take "oxygen pills" to survive the vacuum while using thruster packs to manoeuvre. The ship's "neutroni" radio enables virtually instantaneous communication with Space City and other space vessels over vast distances.

== Characters ==
=== Regular ===
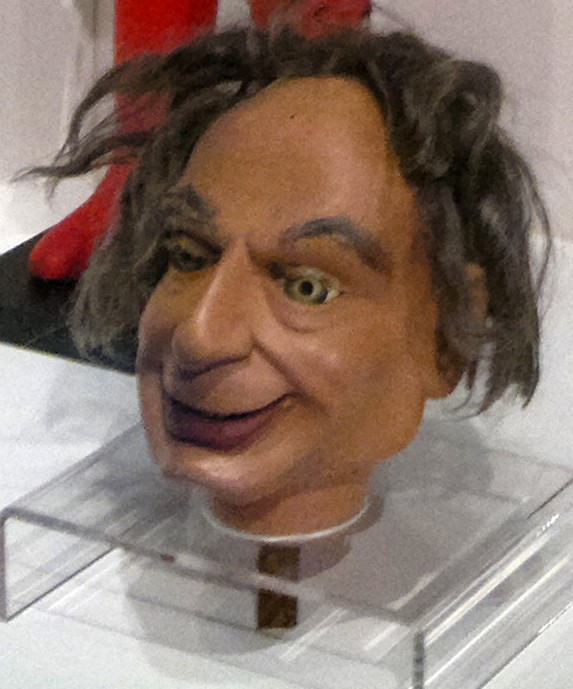
Replica puppet head of Professor Matthew Matic

- Colonel Steve Zodiac (voiced by Paul Maxwell): the pilot and commanding officer of Fireball XL5. In the episode "Space City Special" he is declared "Astronaut of the Year".
- Doctor Venus (voiced by Sylvia Anderson): a doctor of space medicine, of French origin. Zodiac personally selected her to be a member of the XL5 crew. According to the episode "The Last of the Zanadus", Venus has served on the ship for five years.
- Professor Matthew "Matt" Matic (voiced by David Graham): XL5's engineer, navigator and science officer.
- Robert the Robot (voiced by an uncredited Gerry Anderson through an artificial larynx): the co-pilot of XL5, a transparent robot invented by Professor Matic and Earth's most advanced mechanical man.
- Zoonie the Lazoon (voiced by David Graham): Venus's lazy, semi-telepathic pet from planet Colevio. During his early appearances, he can say no more than "welcome home". His vocabulary expands as the series progresses, often due to him mimicking other characters.
- Commander Wilbur Zero (voiced by John Bluthal): the operational commander-in-chief of the World Space Patrol and chief controller of Space City. Despite his gruff exterior, he shows great respect and care for his subordinates, especially Zodiac. Zero's rank appears to be above that of Colonel but below that of Space General.
- Lieutenant Ninety (voiced by David Graham): Space City's assistant controller. He is young, inexperienced and the one most often on the receiving end of Commander Zero's scathing attitude (although Zero also refers to him as "the best lieutenant Space City has"). In one episode he is shown training to be an XL pilot.

=== Recurring ===
- Jock Campbell (voiced by John Bluthal): Space City's chief engineer, of Scottish origin.
- Eleanor and Jonathan Zero (both voiced by Sylvia Anderson): Commander Zero's wife and young son.
- Captain Ken Ross (voiced by John Bluthal): pilot of Fireball XL7. He often needs rescuing by the XL5 crew.
- Mr and Mrs Boris and Griselda Space Spy (voiced by David Graham and Sylvia Anderson): a villainous husband-and-wife pair of Russian origin who first appear in the episode "Spy in Space".
- The Subterrains (voiced by John Bluthal and David Graham): a race of hostile aliens from Planet 46.

== Episodes ==
No.	Title	Directed by	Written by	Original air date (ATV London)	Prod. code
1	"Planet 46"	Gerry Anderson	Gerry and Sylvia Anderson	28 October 1962	1
Fireball XL5 intercepts a missile launched at Earth. Landing on Planet 46, Zodiac and Venus are captured by the villainous Subterrains – who promptly launch a second missile with Venus on board.
2	"The Doomed Planet"	Alan Pattillo	Alan Fennell	4 November 1962	5
An investigation of a flying saucer leads Zodiac to try to save a planet that has broken out of its orbit and is on a collision course with another planet.
3	"Space Immigrants"	Alan Pattillo	Anthony Marriott	11 November 1962	8
The Mayflower III, piloted by Venus, is carrying pioneers to a new planet. However, the indigenous Lillispatians have objections to their world being colonised.
4	"Plant Man From Space"	John Kelly	Anthony Marriott	18 November 1962	6
Matic's old friend, Dr Rootes, attempts to conquer Earth using an invasive species of alien plant life – which promptly runs amok.
5	"Spy in Space"	Alan Pattillo	Alan Fennell	25 November 1962	11
Mr and Mrs Space Spy plot to steal Fireball XL5 from a deep-space refuelling station.
6	"The Sun Temple"	Bill Harris	Alan Fennell	2 December 1962	7
On the planet Rejusca, Zodiac and Zoonie must rescue Venus from sun worshippers who plan to sacrifice her to their solar deity.
7	"XL5 To H_{2}O"	John Kelly	Alan Fennell	9 December 1962	12
XL5 responds to an urgent distress call from the last two survivors of a planet menaced by a weird fish man armed with a poisonous smoke gun.
8	"Space Pirates"	Bill Harris	Anthony Marriott	16 December 1962	13
Attempting to outwit a band of space pirates who are plundering freighters, the XL5 crew are drawn into a complicated game of bluff and double bluff.
9	"Flying Zodiac"	Bill Harris	Anthony Marriott	23 December 1962	10
Zodiac almost falls victim to sabotage at a Space City circus as part of a scheme by Mr and Mrs Space Spy to help alien nomads take over Earth.
10	"Space Pen"	John Kelly	Dennis Spooner	30 December 1962	15
Posing as criminals, the XL5 crew head for the prison planet Conva in pursuit of two Space City raiders, only to end up in Mr and Mrs Space Spy's lethal water chamber.
11	"Space Monster"	John Kelly	Gerry and Sylvia Anderson	6 January 1963	9
Zoonie's talent for mimicry gets the XL5 crew out of a tight spot when they investigate the disappearance of Fireball XL2 and find themselves menaced by a space monster.
12	"The Last of the Zanadus"	Alan Pattillo	Anthony Marriott	13 January 1963	14
The evil Kudos, lone inhabitant of the planet Zanadu, plots to destroy all Lazoons with a deadly virus. When Zoonie is infected, the XL5 crew must race to obtain the cure.
13	"Planet of Platonia"	David Elliott	Alan Fennell	20 January 1963	3
While bringing the King of the Plantium Planet to Earth for trade talks, the XL5 crew foils a plot by the king's aide, Volvo, to kill his ruler and start a war between the two planets.
14	"The Triads"	Alan Pattillo	Alan Fennell	27 January 1963	18
The XL5 crew encounter friendly giants Graff and Snaff on Triad – a planet three times the size of Earth – and help them in their efforts to explore space.
15	"Wings of Danger"	David Elliott	Alan Fennell	3 February 1963	17
While investigating strange signals coming from Planet 46, Zodiac is poisoned by a robot bird equipped with deadly radium capsules. Venus saves his life, but the bird is waiting to strike again.
16	"Convict in Space"	Bill Harris	Alan Fennell	10 February 1963	16
Mr and Mrs Space Spy issue a fake distress call in an attempt to trick Zodiac into handing over a convict (who has stolen a set of plans) being transported to the prison planet.
17	"Space Vacation"	Alan Pattillo	Dennis Spooner	17 February 1963	22
A well-deserved vacation on the planet Olympus turns into a frenzied race against time when the XL5 crew becomes embroiled in a bizarre interplanetary feud.
18	"Flight to Danger"	David Elliott	Alan Fennell	24 February 1963	21
To win his astronaut's wings Lieutenant Ninety must complete a solo orbit of the Moon, but disaster strikes when his rocket ship catches fire.
19	"Prisoner on the Lost Planet"	Bill Harris	Anthony Marriott	3 March 1963	20
Answering a distress call from uncharted space, Steve finds himself on a volcanic planet – where he meets a beautiful exile who threatens to trigger an eruption if he does not help her to escape.
20	"The Forbidden Planet"	David Elliott	Anthony Marriott	10 March 1963	25
Matic uses his latest invention, the Ultrascope, to observe the planet Nutopia – which has never been seen from Earth. But the Nutopians have an invention of their own: a matter transporter.
21	"Robert to the Rescue"	Bill Harris	Dennis Spooner	17 March 1963	24
The XL5 crew are imprisoned on an uncharted world by two Domeheads, who intend to wipe their memories and keep them there forever. It is up to Robert the Robot to rescue them.
22	"Dangerous Cargo"	John Kelly	Dennis Spooner	24 March 1963	27
On a mission to destroy an unstable ghost planet, Zodiac and Matic are caught in a Subterrain trap.
23	"Mystery of the TA2"	John Kelly	Dennis Spooner	31 March 1963	23
When the XL5 crew find the wreck of a spaceship, their search for pilot Colonel Denton leads them to the planet Arctan – where they find that Denton has become king of the native Ice People.
24	"Drama at Space City"	Alan Pattillo	Anthony Marriott	7 April 1963	30
Jonathan Zero's unauthorised midnight exploration of XL5 turns into a terrifying adventure when the ship launches and catches fire.
25	"1875"	Bill Harris	Anthony Marriott	14 April 1963	28
Matic builds a time machine that whisks Zodiac, Venus and Commander Zero back to the Wild West of 1875, where Zodiac becomes a sheriff and Venus and Zero execute a bank robbery.
26	"The Granatoid Tanks"	Alan Pattillo	Alan Fennell	21 April 1963	26
Scientists on a glass-surfaced planet radio for help when they are menaced by six Granatoid tanks. XL5 is powerless to halt the assault, but a stowaway proves to be of unexpected help.
27	"The Robot Freighter Mystery"	David Elliott	Alan Fennell	28 April 1963	29
Zodiac resorts to subterfuge to prove that an unscrupulous pair of space salvage contractors, the Briggs Brothers, are sabotaging robot supply freighters so that they can pick up the pieces.
28	"Whistle for Danger"	John Kelly	Dennis Spooner	5 May 1963	31
A disease has destroyed all plant life on the jungle planet Floran. To eradicate it, the XL5 crew detonate an Ellvium bomb – but Floran's inhabitants suspect their motives and imprison them in a tower.
29	"Trial by Robot"	Bill Harris	Alan Fennell	12 May 1963	36
Disappearances of robots are linked to Professor Himber. With Robert missing, Zodiac and Matic travel to Planet 82 only to be put on trial by the professor – who is ruler of his kidnapped robot race.
30	"A Day in the Life of a Space General"	David Elliott	Alan Fennell	19 May 1963	37
Lieutenant Ninety has a nightmare in which he is promoted to the rank of Space General, but his inexperience gets the better of him and his command ends in disaster.
31	"Invasion Earth"	Alan Pattillo	Dennis Spooner	26 May 1963	34
A strange cloud conceals an alien invasion force.
32	"Faster Than Light"	Bill Harris	Dennis Spooner	2 June 1963	32
An out-of-control Fireball breaks the light barrier, only to emerge in a sea of air.
33	"The Day the Earth Froze"	David Elliott	Alan Fennell	9 June 1963	33
Icemen from the planet Zavia deflect the Sun's rays, plunging Earth into a deep freeze.
34	"The Fire Fighters"	John Kelly	Alan Fennell	16 June 1963	39
Fireballs fall to Earth from a mysterious gas cloud in space. The XL5 crew must contain the cloud before it reaches the atmosphere, but a technical fault forces Steve to complete the work by hand.
35	"Space City Special"	Alan Pattillo	Dennis Spooner	23 June 1963	38
Named "Astronaut of the Year", Zodiac needs all his skill to talk Venus down after she takes over the controls of a supersonic airliner whose pilot has been put in a trance by the Subterrains.
36	"Ghosts of Space"	John Kelly	Alan Fennell	6 October 1963	35
Zodiac and a geologist attempt to solve the mysteries of the seemingly deserted planet Electron, which is replete with electric rocks and weird, poltergeistic happenings.
37	"Hypnotic Sphere"	Alan Pattillo	Alan Fennell	13 October 1963	2
Robert the Robot saves the day when the rest of the XL5 crew is transfixed by a hypnotic sphere that has been hi-jacking space freighters.
38	"Sabotage"	John Kelly	Anthony Marriott	20 October 1963	19
A neutroni bomb is planted aboard XL5 and its crew are kidnapped.
39	"Space Magnet"	Bill Harris	Anthony Marriott	27 October 1963	4
An alien race called the Solars have their own use for Earth's moon.

== Production ==
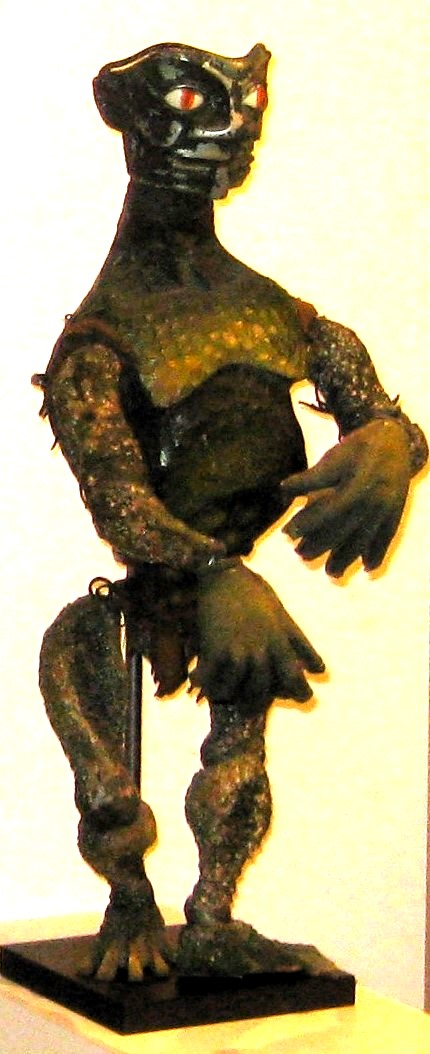
Replica Subterrain puppet

After making Supercar, production company AP Films (APF) presented its investor – Lew Grade of Associated Television – with two ideas for a follow-up series. One of these, titled Century 21 (the original name of the spaceship), was commissioned and produced as Fireball XL5. The rejected proposal, Joe 90, was about a boy called Joe who dreams of carrying out daring space missions as an astronaut codenamed "Joe 90". Unlike Century 21, this concept had a hybrid format – the fantasy sequences being filmed with puppets while the framing stories used live actors. The only creative element shared by the two ideas was the character of Professor Matic. APF would not revisit Joe 90 until 1967, when it developed a series of that title that bore little resemblance to the original idea.

Century 21 drew inspiration from the Space Race of the early 1960s. Despite its title, it was originally to have been set in the 30th century, in the year 2962. This was subsequently changed to 2062. At the same time, the "United States Space Patrol" became the "World Space Patrol" and the name of Colonel Zodiac's spaceship (as well as the series itself) was changed first to Nova X 100, then Fireball XL5. The "XL" of the final title was taken from "Castrol XL" engine oil. Thirty-seven of the series' 39 episodes were written by Alan Fennell, Anthony Marriott or Dennis Spooner, all newcomers to the APF productions. (Spooner, however, had submitted unfilmed scripts for Supercar.) Script supervision was performed by series co-creators and voice artists Gerry and Sylvia Anderson, who also wrote the first episode ("Planet 46") and "Space Monster".

Filming at APF's studios on the Slough Trading Estate began in February 1962. Three stages were used: two for puppet filming (permanent sets on one stage, one-offs on the other) and another for special effects. To speed up production, two puppet filming units were created to allow episodes to be shot in pairs by different crews, who alternated on the first two stages while the effects crew used the third. The production of each episode consisted of a week's principal photography on the main puppet stage followed by inserts-filming on the secondary stage, coinciding with two weeks of effects shooting. After a unit vacated one of the puppet stages, it was set up for the other unit to start or resume filming on another episode.

=== Characters and voice-recording ===
The concept brochure for Century 21 described Colonel Zodiac and Dr Venus as the "Mr and Miss America" of 2962. Venus' face was modelled on her voice actor, Sylvia Anderson. Character dialogue was recorded at a studio in Borehamwood.

Robert the Robot had a Perspex body with a head adapted from a plastic tumbler. He was the only regular in a Gerry Anderson puppet series to be voiced by Anderson himself, who "spoke" the robot's lines (as well as those of supporting robot characters) through an artificial larynx. As remembered by Anderson in a deleted scene of the documentary Filmed in Supermarionation (2014):

... [I]t was very, very difficult, if not impossible, to produce the sort of robot voice which would have to be a monotone. So we found out that at Edinburgh University, they were creating the human voice artificially. They gave us a vibrator – of course, everybody smiled at that – not that kind of vibrator! And it was a vibrator that people who had their larynx removed through cancer would be able to put under their chin, and it made a constant buzz. [Makes buzzing noise.] And then, of course, that sound was transmitted to the air inside the mouth. And I was then able to modulate that by mouthing the words. So let's get this straight, fellas – it was not my voice. It was the sound of the vibrator which I modulated.

Anderson also noted that due to the silent or aspirate nature of the letter "h", the larynx did not register its vocalisation; thus, Robert's customary cry of "On our way home!" was rendered as "ON-OUR-WAY-'OME!". Daniel O'Brien, author of SF:UK – How British Science Fiction Changed the World, describes Robert as a "very English homage" to the character Robby the Robot from the 1956 film Forbidden Planet.

=== Effects and music ===
After working on the Andersons' earlier productions as a contractor, effects director Derek Meddings became a full-time employee of APF and formed his own unit with Brian Johnson as his assistant. According to Meddings, some of the more action-packed episodes featured as many as "40 to 50" effects shots. The rotating Space City control tower, whose filming model was made of wood and card, was inspired by contemporary revolving restaurants. Fireball XL5 was the first TV series to employ front projection-based visual effects.

The XL5 spaceship was designed by associate producer and former APF art director Reg Hill. Three models were made: a seven-foot-long (2.1 m) version, which was used for close-up shots, and two smaller ones measuring 24 inches (61 cm) and five inches (13 cm). XL5's rocket sled launch was based on rumoured Soviet plans to fire craft into space on a track ending in a ramp. Although the 1951 film When Worlds Collide had featured a similar concept, Gerry Anderson denied that XL5's launch method was copied from this. During the filming of the launch sequence, XL5 was pulled down its rail on wires by a technician running along a platform above the set. Fast cutting was employed to conceal the shaking of the model. Some of the series' rocket sound effects were created by recording a jet plane at a nearby airfield.

The Jetmobiles – personal hovercraft that the XL5 crew use to explore the surfaces of planets – were conceived as a way of limiting the number of scenes that showed the characters walking, thus helping to conceal their lack of realistic articulation. Originally the vehicles were to have been rocket-powered; however, tests with miniature explosives proved too destructive so the method of propulsion was changed. The characters of APF's later series Stingray and Thunderbirds use vehicles similar to the Jetmobiles.

The opening theme music features saxophones as well as series composer Barry Gray's first use of an Ondes Martenot. The closing theme song – "Fireball", arranged by Charles Blackwell and performed by Don Spencer – was a minor hit in the UK, spending 12 weeks on the music charts, peaking at number 32 in March 1963.

== Broadcast and reception ==
Fireball XL5 was the only Anderson series to be sold to a US network: NBC, which aired it as part of its Saturday morning children's block from 1963 to September 1965. In the UK, the series was regularly repeated on the ITV network until 1974, followed by an additional re-run in 1985.

In June 2023, the British channel Talking Pictures TV began re-broadcasting the series. Whilst in the United States the series, along with other Anderson Supermarionation series, will be shown on MeTV Toons from 25 July.

=== Critical response ===
According to Jim Sangster and Paul Condon, authors of Collins Telly Guide, "the sheer ambition of the show is its charm." Matthew Millheiser of review website DVD Talk praises the series: "Fireball XL5 might be kitschy, might be chock-full of scientific inaccuracies and glaring anachronisms that was par-for-the-course for cheesy sci-fi of the time, and even might have a few clunker episodes in the mix. But the care, innovation, and sheer imagination in each episode are positively infectious." He goes on to describe the series as "simple, clean, clearly delineated fun" and "the perfect type of children's entertainment: it doesn't talk down to its audience, it doesn't bog down the characters with a faux sophistication or glib hipness, and it has enough dazzle, charm, and imagination to make the show enjoyable and entertaining for adults." For Anthony Clark, Fireball XL5 "marks the start of the truly great Anderson-produced puppet show [...] [W]hen you sprinkle the episodes with humour, lace them with action and tie them up with Barry Gray's fantastic music, the result transcends the show's rudimentaries, transforming it into something enduringly special." Comparing it to the Andersons' follow-up, Stingray, which he considers to be very similar, Clark describes Fireball XL5 as "[p]erhaps [...] a little more playful and a little less slick, but what it lacks in polish it more than makes up for in energy and pace."

According to Paul Mavis of DVD Talk, the series is "not as ambitious ideas-wise" as Stingray yet "still charms, thanks to its simple yet nicely designed production and that velvety, strangely ethereal black-and-white world it creates." He also states that "while there aren't nearly as many elaborate 'hardware' set-ups as later Anderson outings [...] the budget-imposed simplicity adds an amusingly ironic, sleek modernist tone" to the series. In contrast, Stuart Galbraith IV describes the "hardware" as "pretty retro even by 1962 standards", adding that the overall production "looks more like Rocky Jones, Space Ranger than Thunderbirds." On the writing, he notes that while earlier episodes are mostly "strange-planet/Earth-under-threat-type stories", there is an increasing focus on character development as the series progresses. Mavis argues that the characters are limited by the fact that they were purposely conceived as "action/adventure stereotypes". On the writing generally, he considers the "old-school comic book"-style plots to be "less sophisticated than the production design, frequently falling into the same pattern: the UN-like World Space Patrol recognizes a threat from an alien civilisation, sending in Steve Zodiac and team to neutralise it ... before almost getting themselves killed."

For John Peel, Fireball XL5 is one of several APF series to feature capable female characters who are weakened by negative gender stereotypes. Peel describes medical expert Dr Venus as being "relegated to secondary chores", calling this an example of "standard Anderson sexism". Writing for Decider.com, Meghan O'Keefe praises Fireball XL5's humour and special effects but criticises the series' "almost incomprehensible level of misogyny [...] Dr Venus is criticised for not fetching coffee fast enough and later, when she praises Steve's heroism, he replies, 'Thanks, I think you're cute, too.'" O'Keefe also comments that the series "doesn't seem concerned with the morality or the larger social implications of space travel. Just as Dr Venus is constantly written off as a woman, the aliens we meet speak an uncomfortably foreign language and are painted as maniacal terrorists willing to go on suicide missions to destroy Earth [...] There's no nuance, but then, that clearly wasn't the goal. Anderson was clearly trying to make an entertaining show, and it's very, very amusing."

Ian Fryer characterises the series as a Space Western, arguing that Steve Zodiac essentially plays the role of an interstellar sheriff. Fryer also compares David Graham's voice for Professor Matic to that of Western actor "Gabby" Hayes and the French-born Venus to Marlene Dietrich as Frenchy in the film Destry Rides Again (1939). According to Fryer, the series adapts Western stock characters to create an air of "warmth and familiarity".

The series' music has been positively received. According to Clark, the closing theme song's opening lyric, "I wish I was a spaceman", had a "timely resonance" for audiences of the early Space Age. Describing the series overall as "better than a lot of live-action movies", Mark Voger of NJ.com argues that the music "would be at home in any live-action thriller."

== Tie-ins and home video ==
The TV series was supplemented by an audio play, Journey to the Moon, which was produced by APF in association with Pye Records. Written by Alan Fennell and released as a 7-inch vinyl EP in February 1965, this was a semi-educational adventure about a sleeping boy who has a dream in which he meets the XL5 crew, who teach him about spaceflight and the Apollo programme. Patrick Moore was scientific advisor on the production.

Fireball XL5 also spawned tie-ins including toys, an MPC playset with rocket ship and figures, model kits, puppets, ray guns, water pistols, comic strips, and annuals. A black-and-white comic strip, drawn by Neville Main, was printed in TV Comic from 1962 to 1964. In January 1965, the strip moved to the newly-launched TV Century 21 comic, where it remained for the next five years. The comics adventures, written by Tod Sullivan and drawn by Mike Noble, were printed in colour until 1968, when it evolved into a text feature. Four annuals, featuring comic strips and text stories, were published by Collins between 1963 and 1966. The Fireball XL5 strips from TV Century 21 were reprinted in Countdown (later named TV Action) in 1971 and 1972 and again in Engale Marketing's Action 21 in 1988 and 1989. In the US, Gold Key Comics published a single-issue comic book under the title Steve Zodiac and the Fireball XL5 in January 1964; the following year, Little Golden Books published a colour illustrated storybook which was released in the UK under the title Fireball XL5 – A Big Television Book.

The series was released on Region 1 DVD by A&E Home Video in 2003. A Region 2 box set with new bonus material was released in 2009, superseding a 2004 version which had no extras. Also in 2009, a colourised version of the episode "A Day in the Life of a Space General" was released on Blu-ray Disc. In 2021, Network Distributing released the full series on Blu-ray.

== Translations ==
- (in French) : Fusée XL5
- (in Spanish) : El Capitán Marte y el XL5. In the version shown in Latin American countries and in Spain, Colonel Zodiac is called Capitán Marte ("Captain Mars")
- (in Greek) : Πύρινη Σφαίρα (Pyrine Sphaera = Ball of Fire)
- (in Japanese) : 宇宙船XL-5 (Uchuusen XL-5 = Spaceship XL-5)
