= The Big Gun (Stingray) =

- Stingray episode
- Episode no.: Episode 17
- Directed by: David Elliott
- Written by: Alan Fennell
- Cinematography by: John Read
- Editing by: Harry MacDonald
- Production code: 6
- Original air date: 24 January 1965

Guest character voices
- Ray Barrett as Maritimus; Robert Easton as Chorda and WSP Commander; Don Mason as Solarstar Leader; Lois Maxwell as Marineville Tracking Station Operative

Episode chronology
← Previous "The Lighthouse Dwellers"	Next → "The Cool Cave Man"

"The Big Gun" is the 17th episode of Stingray, a British Supermarionation television series created by Gerry and Sylvia Anderson and produced by their company AP Films for ITC Entertainment. Written by Alan Fennell and directed by David Elliott, it was first broadcast on 24 January 1965 on the Anglia, Border, Grampian, ATV London and Southern franchises of the ITV network. It subsequently aired on ATV Midlands on 26 January 1965.

The series follows the missions of the World Aquanaut Security Patrol (WASP), an organisation responsible for policing the Earth's oceans in the 2060s. Headquartered in the self-contained city of Marineville on the West Coast of North America, the WASP operates a fleet of vessels led by Stingray: a combat submarine crewed by Captain Troy Tempest, Lieutenant "Phones" and Marina, a mute woman from under the sea. Stingray's missions bring it into contact with various undersea peoples – some friendly, others hostile – as well as strange natural phenomena. In "The Big Gun", Stingray pursues the people of the undersea city of Solarstar, which threatens the surface world with a weapon of mass destruction capable of obliterating whole continents.

"The Big Gun" forms a segment of the Stingray compilation film Invaders from the Deep, produced by ITC New York in 1981. A comic strip adaptation of the episode, drawn by John Cooper, was serialised in Fleetway's Stingray: The Comic in 1993.

== Plot ==
The inhabitants of the undersea city of Solarstar have perfected a missile warhead capable of starting a chain reaction powerful enough to destroy entire landmasses – even continents. The missile is launched from a submersible armed with a giant cannon resembling a tank gun. Maritimus, one of Solarstar's citizens, tests the weapon on three unpopulated Pacific islands, each of which is obliterated. Returning to Solarstar, he is decorated by the city's leader, who vows to conquer human civilisation and orders Maritimus to destroy the West Coast of the United States.

World Security Patrol HQ orders Marineville to investigate the trail of devastation. Commander Shore dispatches Stingray and its crew survey the area. Captain Tempest and Lieutenant "Phones" detect Maritimus' vessel just as he is aiming a missile at a power station on the West Coast. They torpedo and destroy the craft before it can fire, but Maritimus survives by ejecting in an escape pod. The Solarstar leader subsequently orders the destruction of Marineville.

Taking a second submersible, Maritimus fires a missile at Marineville, but the base's defence rockets track and destroy the missile before it hits. With Marineville safe, Stingray goes after Maritimus. The crew are lured into the Solarstar Sea at the end of a deep-ocean tunnel, where Maritimus intends to ambush them. Stingray exceeds its maximum operating depth, and as the hull buckles from the water pressure, Tempest and Phones pass out and Maritimus moves in for the kill. The crew are saved at the last moment when Marina takes over the controls and shoots down Maritimus' vessel. With Marina's help, Tempest fires a salvo of torpedoes at Solarstar itself, destroying the city. Stingray returns to Marineville, where Shore orders upgrades to the WASP's defensive capabilities.

== Regular voice cast ==
- Ray Barrett as Commander Shore
- Robert Easton as Lieutenant "Phones"
- Don Mason as Captain Troy Tempest

== Production ==
The race of beings inhabiting Solarstar are unnamed in the episode itself but identified as the Trematodes in Stingray: The Comic.

Due to the re-use of various model shots, Maritimus' second submersible is sometimes represented by footage of the first. This produces several continuity errors, as the two craft are shown to have different insignias on their sides.

Original incidental music was recorded on 11 October 1963 at Pye Studios in London with a 28-piece orchestra. Music for the episode "Treasure Down Below" was recorded at the same session.

== Reception ==
Ian Fryer, author of The Worlds of Gerry and Sylvia Anderson, compares the episode unfavourably to "Treasure Down Below" (written by Dennis Spooner) and other episodes by Fennell, criticising the "simplistic militarism" of the script. He notes that the Solarstar people's motivations are never explained and questions the Stingray crew's decision to attack the city, given that Maritimus has been eliminated and the danger has passed: "An entire civilisation has been destroyed with hardly a second's thought."

For Anderson commentator Fred McNamara, the episode "highlights Stingray at its most enjoyably basic". He adds that the story features "precious little nuance or morally grey areas [...] It's very much a case of 'here's your bad guys, here's your good guys - fight!'" He praises the realisation of Solarstar, noting the "colourful production design" of the puppet sets and calling the city's starfish-shaped exterior "one of Stingray's most magnificent [scale] models". He also describes Maritimus, voiced by Ray Barrett, as a "magnificent blend of character design and vocal performance".
