= The Ghost Ship (Stingray) =

- Stingray episode
- Episode no.: Episode 3
- Directed by: Desmond Saunders
- Written by: Alan Fennell
- Cinematography by: John Read
- Editing by: Eric Pask
- Production code: 8
- Original air date: 18 October 1964

Guest character voices
- David Graham as Idotee and the WSP Commander

Episode chronology
| ← Previous "Emergency Marineville" | Next → "Subterranean Sea" |

"The Ghost Ship" is the third episode of Stingray, a British Supermarionation television series created by Gerry and Sylvia Anderson and filmed by their production company AP Films (APF) for ITC Entertainment. Written by Alan Fennell and directed by Desmond Saunders, it was the eighth episode to be filmed and was first broadcast on 18 October 1964 on the Anglia, ATV London, Border, Grampian and Southern franchises of the ITV network. It aired on ATV Midlands, Channel and Westward on 20 October.

The series follows the missions of the World Aquanaut Security Patrol (WASP), an organisation responsible for policing the Earth's oceans in the 2060s. Headquartered at the self-contained city of Marineville on the West Coast of North America, the WASP operates a fleet of vessels led by Stingray: a combat submarine crewed by Captain Troy Tempest, Lieutenant "Phones" and Marina, a mute young woman from under the sea. Stingray's adventures bring it into contact with undersea civilisations – some friendly, others hostile – as well as mysterious natural phenomena. In "The Ghost Ship", the Stingray crew encounter a seemingly deserted galleon while investigating the disappearance of an ocean liner.

== Plot ==
The ocean liner Arcadia disappears at sea. Her last radio transmission – in which the crew reported seeing an old galleon – reaches World Security Patrol (WSP) headquarters, who relay it to the World Aquanaut Security Patrol (WASP) in Marineville with orders to investigate. Captain Troy Tempest, Lieutenant "Phones" and Marina depart in Stingray, joined by Commander Shore.

Stingray arrives at Arcadia's last known position and makes visual contact with the galleon, which does not respond to Troy's hails. Shore and Phones board the ship and find its upper decks deserted. In the galley, they find a table set for a meal which is still warm. While contemplating this oddity, they fail to notice a platform in the floor and are lowered into the bowels of the ship, where they are met by an undersea pirate, Idotee. Holding them at gunpoint, Idotee explains that he has converted the galleon into a submarine and used its cannons to sink Arcadia. Now he intends to kill the Stingray crew for their crimes against the undersea races.

Idotee tells Shore to radio Troy and instruct him to come aboard, but Shore orders Troy to attack the galleon instead. Troy is unwilling to do either and submerges Stingray to evade the furious Idotee's cannon fire. Submerging the galleon, Idotee threatens to kill Shore and Phones unless Troy surrenders. Forced to obey, Troy puts on a diving suit and exits Stingray, then enters the galleon through an airlock. Idotee, who never intended to leave anyone alive, has tied Shore and Phones to chairs in front of a double-barrelled cannon rigged to fire harpoons into them. Unknown to the others, one of Troy's diving cylinders is filled with laughing gas. He discreetly unseals the cylinder and the gas is released into the ship. Idotee, Shore and Phones collapse into fits of uncontrollable laughter and pass out. Troy, who swallowed a pill to negate the gas's effects, kicks the cannon aside just before it fires, saving Shore and Phones.

The Stingray crew take Idotee into custody and return to Marineville. Shore decides not to punish Troy for his insubordination and instead thanks him for his bravery.

== Regular voice cast ==
- Ray Barrett as Commander Shore
- Robert Easton as Lieutenant Phones
- Don Mason as Captain Troy Tempest

== Production ==
Although Idotee is named in the script, the character does not identify himself in dialogue, instead telling Shore and Phones that his name is "of no consequence".

The galleon studio model was built by the APF special effects department under the supervision of effects director Derek Meddings, while the puppet-sized decks were designed by art director Bob Bell. Both the galleon model and the deck sets were re-used for the episode "Set Sail for Adventure", where they appear as Admiral Denver's ship.

The incidental music was composed between 16 and 22 October 1963. It was recorded on 25 October with a 30-piece orchestra at Pye Studios, London. Music for "The Golden Sea" was recorded during the same session.

== Reception ==
Commentator Fred McNamara summarises the episode as "an exceptionally well-crafted fusion of character drama and atmospheric set pieces". He considers Idotee one of the "most menacing" Stingray villains" and calls the reveal of the galleon's true nature "thrilling to see unfold". McNamara also notes that the climax involving the rigged diving cylinder is "deliberately side-splitting", creating "a surreal gallows humour". He calls Shore's role away from Marineville "an enjoyable oddity", writing that the Commander accompanies Tempest and Phones for no obvious reason "other than he simply wanted to".

Writing for fanzine Andersonic, Vincent Law compares "The Ghost Ship" to the episodes "A Nut for Marineville", "Pink Ice" and "Invisible Enemy" for the way in which the characters react to the threat posed by Idotee. He notes that in the latter two episodes "the bottom line [is] 'blast them before they blast us'", while the former two "riff on pretty much the same theme, the stock response to the unknown usually being to shoot first." Law also praises the flute music that accompanies the first appearance of the galleon, describing the piece as "unforgettable" and arguing that it "perfectly encapsulates the whole series." Anthony Clark of sci-fi-online.com describes the episode's incidental music as "spine-tingling stuff".

== Adaptations ==
The episode was adapted into a picture book in 1992 and serialised as a three-part strip in Fleetway's Stingray: The Comic in 1993. The comic strip was followed up with a feature that gave the backstory of Idotee, revealing him to be more than 200 "marine years" old.
