= Titan Goes Pop =

- Stingray episode
- Episode no.: Episode 10
- Directed by: Alan Pattillo
- Written by: Dennis Spooner
- Cinematography by: Paddy Seale
- Editing by: Eric Pask
- Production code: 29
- Original air date: 6 December 1964

Guest character voices
- Ray Barrett as Duke Dexter & a WSP Commander; Robert Easton as the 1st WSP Commander; David Graham as Sandy Gibson & a WSP Commander; Don Mason as Dexter's Announcer, Security Checkpoint Guard & Main Gate Guard; Gary Miller as Dexter's singing voice

Episode chronology
← Previous "Raptures of the Deep"	Next → "In Search of the Tajmanon"

"Titan Goes Pop" is an episode of Stingray, a British Supermarionation television series created by Gerry and Sylvia Anderson and filmed by their production company AP Films (APF) for ITC Entertainment. Written by Dennis Spooner and directed by Alan Pattillo, it was the 29th episode to be filmed and was first broadcast on 6 December 1964 by the Anglia, ATV London, Border, Grampian and Southern franchises of the ITV network. It subsequently aired on ATV Midlands, Channel and Westward on 8 December.

The series follows the missions of the World Aquanaut Security Patrol (WASP), an organisation responsible for policing the oceans in the 2060s. Headquartered in the self-contained city of Marineville on the West Coast of North America, the WASP operates a fleet of vessels led by Stingray: a combat submarine crewed by Captain Troy Tempest, Lieutenant "Phones" and Marina, a mute young woman from under the sea. Stingray's adventures bring it into contact with undersea civilisations – some friendly, others hostile – as well as mysterious natural phenomena. The WASP's most powerful enemy is King Titan, ruler of the undersea city of Titanica.

In "Titan Goes Pop", Titan's agent X-2-Zero kidnaps a famous pop singer visiting Marineville. The episode has been positively received by commentators, who note its humour and view the premise as a parody of Beatlemania and 1960s pop culture. It has been called a "key episode" and "highlight" of Stingray. The episode was included in the limited-edition Filmed in Supermarionation Blu-ray box set released in 2015.

== Plot ==
The World Security Patrol commanders inform Commander Shore that famous pop singer Duke Dexter will perform at the WASP's upcoming recruiting show in Marineville. Although Dexter's appearance is meant to be a surprise, the press get wind of the story and before long Marineville is inundated by hundreds of Dexter's hysterical fans.

Surface Agent X-2-Zero has been monitoring events from his house on Lemoy Island. Mistakenly deducing that Dexter is the most important person ever to visit Marineville, he reports to his master, Titan, who orders him to bring Dexter to Titanica. Disguising himself as a fanboy, X-2-Zero travels to Marineville and tricks Dexter's manager, Sandy Gibson, into believing that he is an undercover agent called "X" serving as Dexter's bodyguard. To get Dexter into Marineville unnoticed, Gibson and Shore have Captain Troy Tempest dress as the singer to distract the screaming crowds while the real Dexter arrives by helicopter.

X-2-Zero offers Dexter accommodation on Lemoy. He later drugs Dexter's meal to knock him out, then takes him to Titanica by submersible. With Gibson unable to reach Dexter by telephone, the Stingray crew search Lemoy only to find Dexter and "X" gone. They detect X-2-Zero's submersible on Stingray's scanners, but as they move to intercept, Stingray breaks down when one of its stabilisers comes loose.

Titan asks Dexter whether it is true that people go crazy on seeing him. Dexter says that it is, confirming Titan's belief that Dexter is causing humanity to destroy itself and will make a great ally. He has Dexter drugged again and returned to Lemoy. After being rescued by the WASP, Dexter claims that he was abducted by underwater beings, but Shore believes that it was just a publicity stunt.

The episode ends with Dexter performing his latest hit, "I've Got Something to Shout About", to an ecstatic crowd at the recruiting show. In Titanica, Titan and X-2-Zero gleefully watch the live broadcast, confident that Dexter's stardom will facilitate their conquest of humanity.

== Regular voice cast ==
- Ray Barrett as Commander Shore and King Titan
- Robert Easton as Surface Agent X-2-Zero
- Don Mason as Captain Troy Tempest

== Production ==
Although the closing titles credit the script to Alan Fennell, "Titan Goes Pop" was actually written by Dennis Spooner.

Several major scenes were cut, including one in which the WSP commanders discuss sending the letter that Commander Shore receives at the start of the episode. The deleted scenes also included a montage revealing how the press learn of Dexter's visit: besides the shot of the front page of the Marineville Observer newspaper (which was retained in the finished episode), there would have been images of a telephone switchboard with numerous hands switching leads, as well as telephone or radio mast wires transmitting signals.

The script characterised Dexter's song as a "'Twist and Shout'-type number". Dexter's singing voice was provided by Gary Miller, who also performed the series' closing theme, "Aqua Marina". An instrumental version of the song "I've Got Something to Shout About" can be heard in the earlier episode "The Man from the Navy". Another variation is featured in "Set Sail for Adventure", the next episode to enter production after "Titan Goes Pop".

== Reception ==
Phelim O'Neill of The Guardian calls the episode "hilarious". Simon Archer and Marcus Hearn, authors of What Made Thunderbirds Go! The Authorised Biography of Gerry Anderson, regard it as a "highlight" of Stingray. Writing for Starburst magazine, Fred McNamara calls "Titan Goes Pop" a "key" episode of the series and one of eight "essential episodes" of Supermarionation. Describing the episode as a "wry parody of Beatlemania", he adds that it "highlights Stingray's approach to comedy", also stating that the voice cast "are given ample material to play with in Fennell's sharp disdain of celebrity culture." McNamara finds the story particularly funny in having Titan believe that the devotion of Duke Dexter's fans can be used as a weapon against human civilisation.

Ian Fryer, author of The Worlds of Gerry and Sylvia Anderson, considers "Titan Goes Pop" to be the series' "key episode" as well as its "funniest" instalment, describing the story as a "fascinating and wildly entertaining spoof of the phenomenon of the pop superstar". He writes that Dexter's presence in Marineville leads to "great jokes" while the exchanges between Titan and X-2-Zero boast "some of the best dialogue in the entire series". On the ending, he writes that Titan and X-2-Zero's clueless reactions to Dexter's performance "[echo] some of the fears of the more apocalyptic commentators of the '50s and '60s at the effects of popular culture on society." He compares the physical appearance of Dexter to that of Elvis Presley and the character's vocal style to that of Buddy Holly or Adam Faith. Andrew Pixley points out that Dexter, whom he describes as a teen idol, wears a lamé suit similar to Presley's from the cover of the album 50,000,000 Elvis Fans Can't Be Wrong.

Vincent Law views the episode as a parody of teen culture. Comparing the premise to Beatlemania "in its hysterical early days", Paul O'Brien comments that Dexter's appearances "brilliantly mimic Elvis Presley's effect on late '50s audiences", and suggests that Commander Shore and Titan embody older people's "incomprehension" of modern pop culture. He observes that because the TV audience had become familiar with the regular characters, Spooner was "able to have some fun" in lampooning them. O'Brien also praises the scale model work but describes the projection shots of the disguised Troy running away from Dexter's fans as a "total failure", commenting that it "looks like the puppet is being stretched on a rack."

In an otherwise positive review of Stingray's soundtrack, Anthony Clark of sci-fi-online.com criticises "I've Got Something to Shout About", calling the song "truly dreadful" and "best skipped".
