= Plant of Doom =

- Stingray episode
- Title card, showing the eponymous plant
- Episode no.: Episode 34
- Directed by: David Elliott
- Written by: Alan Fennell
- Cinematography by: John Read
- Editing by: Eric Pask
- Production code: 2
- Original air date: 23 May 1965

Guest character voices
- David Graham as an Aquaphibian

Episode chronology
← Previous "Sea of Oil"	Next → "The Master Plan"

"Plant of Doom" is an episode of Stingray, a British Supermarionation television series created by Gerry and Sylvia Anderson and produced by their company AP Films for ITC Entertainment. Written by Alan Fennell and directed by David Elliott, it was the second episode to be filmed but was first broadcast as the 34th episode, late in the series' original run, on 23 May 1965 on ATV London.

The series follows the missions of the World Aquanaut Security Patrol (WASP), an organisation responsible for policing the Earth's oceans in the 2060s. Headquartered in the self-contained city of Marineville on the West Coast of North America, the WASP operates a fleet of vessels led by Stingray: a combat submarine crewed by Captain Troy Tempest, Lieutenant "Phones" and Marina, a mute young woman from under the sea. Stingray's adventures bring it into contact with undersea civilisations – some friendly, others hostile – as well as mysterious natural phenomena. The WASP's most powerful enemy is King Titan, ruler of the ocean floor city of Titanica.

"Plant of Doom" sees Titan, outraged by his slave Marina's defection to the WASP (as seen in the first episode), plot his revenge by ordering his henchman, Surface Agent X-2-Zero, to deliver a lethal plant to Marina's father.

== Plot ==
Furious at Marina's betrayal, Titan vows revenge and asks the fish god Teufel for guidance. Teufel opens his mouth, causing a nearby plant to emit powerful fumes that consume the surrounding air, nearly suffocating Titan. After recovering, Titan realises that Teufel has given him a weapon.

At Marineville, Captain Troy Tempest and Lieutenant "Phones" notice Marina crying and deduce that she is homesick. With the permission of Commander Shore, the Stingray crew depart for the underwater city of Pacifica, ruled by Marina's father Aphony.

From his outpost on Lemoy Island, Surface Agent X-2-Zero alerts Titan to Stingray's movements. Sensing an opportunity, Titan dispatches X-2-Zero to Pacifica with the plant, now sealed in a jar. At the same time, he has a Mechanical Fish attack Stingray to delay Troy, Marina and Phones. Following a chase, Troy and Phones destroy the Mechanical Fish using Stingray's torpedoes.

Reaching Pacifica first, X-2-Zero informs Aphony of Marina's return and gives him the plant as a show of good faith. Troy, Marina and Phones arrive and are treated to a lavish meal, during which Marina takes an interest in the plant. Although she is tempted to stay in Pacifica, she eventually has a change of heart and accompanies Troy and Phones back to Marineville, taking the plant with her. She later gives it to Lieutenant Atlanta Shore as a present.

Alone in her quarters, Atlanta takes the plant out of its jar and passes out from its fumes, but is saved from death when Troy breaks in. Suspicion falls on Marina, but Troy refuses to accept that she is a spy. The WASP personnel decide to test Marina's loyalty by summoning her to Atlanta's quarters with the plant still present. Her innocence is proven when she fails to smash the plant and instead succumbs to the fumes. Troy disposes of the plant and the group apologise to Marina for doubting her. The episode ends with Atlanta teaching Marina to play the piano, watched by Troy, Phones and Commander Shore.

== Regular voice cast ==
- Ray Barrett as Commander Shore and King Titan
- Robert Easton as Lieutenant "Phones" and Surface Agent X-2-Zero
- Don Mason as Captain Troy Tempest
- Lois Maxwell as Lieutenant Atlanta Shore

== Production ==
The second episode to be filmed, "Plant of Doom" was described by contemporary trade press as one of "three colour pilots" for Stingray, together with the first episode and the third, "Sea of Oil". It was originally titled "The Plant of Doom". The first version of the script, written before the commencement of principal photography on the series, had enough material to last 50 minutes – twice as long as the finished episode. Cuts necessary to bring the episode down to size included scenes reminding viewers of the love triangle between Marina, Troy and Atlanta, while hinting at the possibility of Phones being attracted to Marina. The original script also explained how X-2-Zero travels from Lemoy to Titanica to collect the plant from Titan.

The scale model representing X-2-Zero's submersible, which would re-appear in later episodes, was built using parts from a Revell Bell X-5 model kit. During filming, director David Elliott sometimes opted not to follow the scripted camera movements – for example, replacing moving tracking shots with static establishing shots. The underwater chase sequence included a complex model shot in which Stingray shoots out of the sea, pursued by the Mechanical Fish, then nose-dives back underwater (in a motion the script compared to a "salmon leap"). Despite the challenge posed by the speeds and precise movements required, the shot was filmed in one take, to the surprise of special effects director Derek Meddings. It was subsequently incorporated into the series' opening titles.

The incidental music was written on 26 August 1963 and recorded on 6 September at Pye Studios in London with a 30-piece orchestra. Music for "Sea of Oil" was recorded during the same session.

== Broadcast ==
Chris Bentley notes the unusual position of "Plant of Doom" in the original running order, pointing out that as it is set immediately after the pilot it should have been transmitted as the second episode. Ian Fryer of FAB magazine suggests that ATV regarded "Plant of Doom" as a good episode and held it back for reasons of audience measurement: as viewing figures tend to fall in the middle of a series, running orders may be changed so that "stronger" episodes air at the start and end and "weaker" ones in the middle.

The BBC repeats of Stingray in the 1990s and 2000s used the running order devised by ITC, which matches the order of production. Consequently, for these runs, "Plant of Doom" was broadcast as the second episode.

== Reception ==
Writing for Andersonic, Vincent Law suggests that the focus on Marina's desire to return home makes "Plant of Doom" an unusual episode of Stingray, noting that most of the episodes were "written as straightforward adventures, the heroes' journey taking precedence over their needs".
