= Stand By for Action (Stingray) =

- Stingray episode
- Episode no.: Episode 25
- Directed by: Alan Pattillo
- Written by: Dennis Spooner
- Cinematography by: Paddy Seale
- Editing by: Eric Pask
- Production code: 17
- Original air date: 21 March 1965

Guest character voices
- Ray Barrett as Johnny Swoonara; David Graham as Marty

Episode chronology
← Previous "Treasure Down Below"	Next → "Pink Ice"

"Stand By for Action" is the 25th episode of Stingray, a British Supermarionation television series created by Gerry and Sylvia Anderson and produced by their company AP Films (APF) for ITC Entertainment. Written by Dennis Spooner and directed by Alan Pattillo, it was first broadcast on 21 March 1965 on the Anglia, ATV London, Grampian and Southern franchises of the ITV network. It subsequently aired on ATV Midlands on 24 March 1965.

The series follows the missions of the World Aquanaut Security Patrol (WASP), an organisation responsible for policing the Earth's oceans in the 2060s. Headquartered at the self-contained city of Marineville on the West Coast of North America, the WASP operates a fleet of vessels led by Stingray: a combat submarine crewed by Captain Troy Tempest, Lieutenant "Phones" and Marina, a mute young woman from under the sea. Stingray's adventures bring it into contact with undersea civilisations – some friendly, others hostile – as well as mysterious natural phenomena. The WASP's most powerful enemy is King Titan, ruler of the ocean floor city of Titanica.

In "Stand By for Action", the WASP are working with a film production company to make an action movie based on Stingray's exploits, unaware that it is part of an elaborate plot by Titan's agent X-2-Zero to kill Troy.

== Plot ==
A film studio, Goggleheimer Productions, is turning Stingray's exploits into an action movie. Most of the WASP personnel are cast as themselves, but the director, Marty, is unhappy with Captain Troy Tempest as the lead and replaces him with prima donna Hollywood actor Johnny Swoonara. The heart-throb's arrival at Marineville causes Troy to lose the admiration of Marina and Lieutenant Atlanta Shore, who idolise Swoonara and repeatedly faint in his presence.

The producer, Mr Goggleheimer, is actually Titan's disguised agent X-2-Zero, who is financing the film as part of his latest scheme to kill Troy. After missing an opportunity to shoot him in the back with a handgun, X-2-Zero uses a knife to cut the ropes on an overhead lighting rig, causing it to fall to the floor and almost crush Troy. Joined by Lieutenant "Phones", Troy commandeers Swoonara's hovercar and pursues X-2-Zero to his house on Lemoy Island. However, by changing into a new disguise, X-2-Zero passes himself off as an innocent local, and the officers return to Marineville empty-handed.

Angered by X-2-Zero's failure, Titan orders him to destroy Stingray. Piloting his submersible, X-2-Zero intercepts Stingray during a location shoot and cripples it with a torpedo. Swoonara, playing Troy, cannot deal with the situation and suffers a nervous breakdown. Reaching his comrades by sea scooter, Troy takes charge and helps Phones navigate Stingray back to Marineville. Atlanta and Marina get over Swoonara and acknowledge Troy as their true hero.

== Regular voice cast ==
- Ray Barrett as King Titan
- Robert Easton as Lieutenant "Phones" and Surface Agent X-2-Zero
- Don Mason as Captain Troy Tempest
- Lois Maxwell as Lieutenant Atlanta Shore

== Production ==
The Johnny Swoonara puppet was originally Colonel Steve Zodiac in Fireball XL5, altered for its appearance in this episode with a darker wig of hair. Swoonara's arrival at Marineville is accompanied by a fanfare that was originally composed for the Fireball XL5 episode "Flying Zodiac". The hovercar that X-2-Zero uses to make his getaway first appeared as Zodiac's car in the same series.

The puppet playing director Marty was modelled on Abe Mandell, a producer with ITC's New York branch. Gerry Anderson deduced that APF's puppet sculptors must have "clocked" Mandell during one of his visits to the UK.

The film studio set used props from the Black Rock base featured in Supercar. The walls of the set were actual walls of APF's studios on the Slough Trading Estate. According to Anderson, the overhead lights that fall on Troy were not miniature models, but working lights from the studios.

Most of the incidental music was recycled from earlier Stingray episodes, as well as episodes of Supercar and Fireball XL5. The only original music cue was a series of electronic chords that serve to identify X-2-Zero masquerading as "Mr Goggleheimer".

== Reception ==
In his DVD audio commentary for the episode, Anderson remembered "Stand By for Action" as a particularly fun episode to film. He noted that the guest characters are parodies of film actors and production crew, remarking that moments like Atlanta and Marina's swooning were intended to "take the mickey out of our thespian friends". He thought that such behaviour was reminiscent of the hysterical reactions of screaming fans to contemporary stars like Frank Sinatra. Ian Fryer, who notes that the episode lampoons film stars, writes that the caricatured look of Fireball XL5's Zodiac puppet – modelled to serve as a "handsome, all-American hero" – made it an ideal object of parody in Stingray, whose puppet cast had been sculpted with greater realism.

Fred McNamara praises the episode, noting that Swoonara – whose "jet-black hair and suave manner" he likens to those of Elvis – is voiced "to wonderfully camp effect" by Ray Barrett. On the premise, he comments that "it's just so amusingly meta to think that the WASPs are basically producing their equivalent of A Hard Day's Night, portraying exaggerated versions of themselves to tell, presumably, a day in the life of Stingray." He considers the episode similar to "Titan Goes Pop" but with weaker "execution", arguing that X-2-Zero's scheming is poorly thought out: "Was his intention just to kill Troy and frame it as an accident on the film's set all along? An entire movie production had been set up, just for the bumbling underwater operative to fail to take Troy out in the most awkwardly visible manner possible?" He also questions Titan's order to destroy Stingray given that Tempest is no longer piloting it. However, he concludes that "for all of its faults in storytelling logic, ['Stand By for Action' is] still a charmingly silly adventure with a pleasantly low-level sense of threat."
