= Tom Thumb Tempest =

- Stingray episode
- Episode no.: Episode 22
- Directed by: Alan Pattillo
- Written by: Alan Fennell
- Cinematography by: Paddy Seale
- Editing by: Harry MacDonald
- Production code: 21
- Original air date: 28 February 1965

Guest character voices
- David Graham as the Aquaphibian butler and TV newsreader

Episode chronology
← Previous "Invisible Enemy"	Next → "Eastern Eclipse"

"Tom Thumb Tempest" is the 22nd episode of Stingray, a British Supermarionation television series created by Gerry and Sylvia Anderson and produced by their company AP Films (APF) for ITC Entertainment. Written by Alan Fennell and directed by Alan Pattillo, it was first broadcast on 28 February 1965 on the Anglia, ATV London, Grampian and Southern franchises of the ITV network. It subsequently aired on ATV Midlands on 3 March 1965.

The series follows the missions of the World Aquanaut Security Patrol (WASP), an organisation responsible for policing the Earth's oceans in the 2060s. Headquartered at the self-contained city of Marineville on the West Coast of North America, the WASP operates a fleet of vessels led by Stingray: a combat submarine crewed by Captain Troy Tempest, Lieutenant "Phones" and Marina, a mute young woman from under the sea. Stingray's adventures bring it into contact with undersea civilisations – some friendly, others hostile – as well as mysterious natural phenomena. The WASP's most powerful enemy is King Titan, ruler of the ocean floor city of Titanica.

In "Tom Thumb Tempest", Troy has a nightmare in which Stingray and its crew are miniaturised. The use of life-sized sets to convey the shrinking of the puppet characters has drawn a mixed response from commentators. Fennell later authored a picture book based on the episode titled Stingray: Terror of the Giants (1993, Boxtree Ltd).

== Plot ==
The Stingray crew are relaxing in the Marineville standby lounge when Commander Shore orders them to prepare for launch, warning them of a dangerous mission. Captain Troy Tempest is eager to leave immediately but Shore tells him to await further instructions. Troy's attention turns to the fish in the lounge aquarium. He then falls asleep in his chair.

Troy wakes to the sound of Shore on the intercom, ordering the crew to launch. He leaves Marineville in Stingray with Lieutenant "Phones" and Marina. Shore radios in, instructing Troy to pilot Stingray through an undersea tunnel. Troy asks for details of the mission but Shore gruffly denies his request.

Stingray exits the tunnel and collides with a sheet of glass. The crew are astonished to find that they and the submarine have shrunk and have ended up inside a fish tank within a giant dining room. Leaving Stingray on their personal hovercraft, they switch on a television set and watch a news bulletin announcing that Stingray and its crew are missing. Turning off the TV, they then investigate the dining table, which has been set for various undersea villains. At the head of the table – laid for Titan – is a schematic of Marineville's defence systems. The crew realise that they have stumbled across a gathering of the undersea races to plot the destruction of Marineville. They are unable to return to Stingray because they have partially un-shrunk, being too large to enter the submarine but still only a fraction of human size.

The crew take cover when an Aquaphibian dressed as a butler briefly steps into the room to check the table. They then use a nearby telephone to call Marineville. Shore answers and Troy attempts to explain the situation, but Shore thinks that Troy is prank-calling and hangs up. The crew are again forced to hide when the Aquaphibian returns with Titan's agent X-2-Zero – the dining room is in X-2-Zero's house on the island of Lemoy. Noticing the mess the crew have made, X-2-Zero reprimands the Aquaphibian for what he assumes to be poor table setting, then leaves the room. The Aquaphibian tidies up and follows him.

The crew destroy the schematic by soaking it in alcohol and setting it alight. The fire soon engulfs the room. The crew flee to the fish tank, re-shrinking as they go, and re-enter Stingray. As the aquarium boils, Troy realises that Stingray is trapped. He orders Phones to fire a torpedo to shatter the glass, hoping that the escaping water will put out the fire.

As the torpedo is fired, Troy wakes to find himself back in the Marineville lounge – the mission he experienced was just a nightmare. Shore tells the crew to stand down and Troy apologises to Shore for his impatience.

== Regular voice cast ==
- Ray Barrett as Commander Shore
- Robert Easton as Lieutenant "Phones" and Surface Agent X-2-Zero
- Don Mason as Captain Troy Tempest

== Production ==
The title of the episode was based on the folklore character Tom Thumb. In the script, the Aquaphibian butler was called "Jeevesea" – a pun on the fictional valet Jeeves.

"Tom Thumb Tempest" was significant for presenting Stingray's 1/3-scale puppets on a life-sized set. (At one point, Troy remarks that the contents of the room appear to be "three times" larger than normal.) It was not the first episode of an APF series to deal with miniaturised characters: the idea had previously been explored in Supercar's "Calling Charlie Queen" and Fireball XL5's "The Triads". However, while those episodes had used back projection to achieve a miniaturisation effect, "Tom Thumb Tempest" placed the "shrunken" characters on a physical set. Stephen La Rivière cites "Tom Thumb Tempest" as another example of the "Land-of-Giants-type" episode that APF had attempted on its previous two series.

== Reception ==
Gerry Anderson biographers Simon Archer and Marcus Hearn consider "Tom Thumb Tempest" to be one of Stingray's most entertaining episodes. By contrast, TV Zone names it the worst of the series, calling the ending "reasonably clever" but the overall episode a "wasted opportunity". The magazine argues that the episode is spoiled by its use of "two hoary old clichés – the 'incredible shrinking cast' idea [...] and the 'it was all a dream' cop-out ending" – the former merely emphasising the "unreality" of the plot, the latter making the episode "entirely inconsequential". It also criticises the dream sequence itself for being insufficiently surreal and "[degenerating] into sub-Tom-and-Jerry shenanigans" towards the end.

Jim Sangster and Paul Condon, authors of Collins Telly Guide, describe the episode as "decidedly less aimed at realism" than those of later Supermarionation series. They also refer to dream sequences in general as "one of Anderson's most annoying recurring plot devices". Fred McNamara comments: "It's weird that a series so naturally embracing of humour as Stingray felt compelled to tap into the surrealist opportunities that dream episodes offered. When you've already gone as strange as 'Subterranean Sea' or 'The Ghost Ship', why do you need dream episodes?" Arguing that "Tom Thumb Tempest" combines the "two odd concepts" of size change and dreaming "into a satisfying whole", he praises the episode's use of "visual gags" and "tilted Dutch camera angles". He adds that while the cliffhanger ending to Troy's nightmare may seem anticlimactic, because the story is "full of misdirection, pulling the rug from under our feet [...] is a perfectly suitable way to end the episode". He questions how X-2-Zero could be in the nightmare given that he uses disguises and the Stingray crew do not know his real identity, calling this a "curious wobble of continuity".

Stephen La Rivière argues that the "tantalising glimpse of reality" provided by this episode conflicted with APF's ongoing efforts to make its puppet characters seem more human. Ian Fryer regards the episode as a precursor of the final Supermarionation series, The Secret Service, which included both puppet sequences and long-shot footage of live actors.
