= Stingray (disambiguation) =

A stingray is a type of cartilaginous fish.

Stingray or Sting Ray may also refer to:

== People and characters ==
=== Persons ===
- Joanna Stingray (born 1960), American singer and actress
- "Sting Ray" Davis (1940–2005), American musician
- Sting Ray Robb (born 2001), American auto racing driver

=== Fictional characters ===
- Stingray Timmins, a character on the Australian soap opera Neighbours
- Lord Stingray, a fictional character on the American animated TV series Superjail!
- Stingray (Marvel Comics), a Marvel Comics character
- Stingray, the main antagonist from Godfrey Ho's 1993 martial arts film Undefeatable
- Stingray (DC Extended Universe), a fictional character in the 2023 American superhero film Aquaman and the Lost Kingdom
- Sylia Stingray, of the Japanese cyberpunk action anime Bubblegum Crisis

== Places ==
- Sting Ray Harbour, original name given to Botany Bay, Australia by James Cook
- Stingray Nebula, a planetary nebula in the southern constellation Ara

== Arts and entertainment ==
=== Film and television ===
- Stingray (1964 TV series), a British children's Supermarionation TV series
  - "Stingray" (Stingray episode), the first episode of the above series
- Stingray (1985 TV series), an American drama
- Stingray (film), a 1978 action comedy film directed by Richard Taylor
- USS Stingray, a fictional U.S. Navy diesel-electric attack submarine, from the film Down Periscope

=== Music ===
- Music Man StingRay, an electric bass guitar
- Stingray (album), by rock singer Joe Cocker
- Stingray Music, a Canadian digital television audio service

==== Songs ====
- "Stingray", a 1965 instrumental single by The Tornados
- "Stingray", a 1965 song by instrumental rock band The Shadows
- "Stingray", a 1969 song by the Jazz Crusaders off the album Powerhouse
- "Sting Ray", a 1982 song by Insect Surfers
- "Sting Ray", a 2006 song by The Rip Chords off the album Summer U.S.A.!

==== Bands ====
- Stingray (band), a South African rock band, active around 1980
- The Sting-rays, a British (Greater London) psychobilly band, active 1980s
- The Stingrays (Bristol band), a British new wave musical group, active 1977-present
- King Stingray, an Australian band, active in 2020s

=== Other uses in arts and entertainment ===
- Stingray Group, a media and entertainment company
- Stingray (ride), an amusement park attraction
- Autodesk Stingray, a video game engine owned by Autodesk - formerly called Bitsquid

== Sports teams ==
- Dandenong Stingrays, an Australian rules football team that plays in an under 18s league in Victoria
- Florida Stingrays, a team of the American Indoor Football Association
- Gold Coast Stingrays, an Australian Gridiron football club of the Gridiron Queensland League
- Hull Stingrays, an ice hockey club from Kingston upon Hull, England
- Long Beach Stingrays, a defunct professional women's basketball team of the American Basketball League
- Rhode Island Stingrays, a defunct American soccer team of the USL Premier Development League
- San Diego Stingrays, a defunct semi-professional basketball team that was a member of the International Basketball League
- South Carolina Stingrays, an ECHL professional minor-league hockey team

== Vehicles ==
=== Cars ===
- Chevrolet Corvette (C2), produced between 1963 and 1967
- Chevrolet Corvette (C3), produced between 1968 and 1982
- Chevrolet Corvette (C7), produced between 2014 and 2019
- Chevrolet Corvette (C8), beginning with model year 2020
- Corvette Stingray (concept car), designed in 1957
- Suzuki Wagon R Stingray, variant of the Suzuki Wagon R

=== Aircraft ===
- MH-68A Stingray, a variant of the AgustaWestland AW109 helicopter, used by the US Coast Guard
- Boeing MQ-25 Stingray, an aerial refuelling drone in development for the US Navy
- Dyke Stingray, a variant of the Dyke Delta home-built aircraft
- Progressive Aerodyne Stingray, an American flying boat design

=== Other vehicles ===
- Sting-Ray, a bicycle made by Schwinn Bicycle Company
- Stingray light tank, an armored vehicle
- USS Stingray, two real submarines and two fictional ones
- USS David R. Ray (DD-971), a Spruance-class destroyer, nicknamed Sting Ray

== Other uses ==
- Sting Ray torpedo, a naval weapon
- Stingray phone tracker, a cellular phone surveillance device manufactured by Harris Corporation
- Stingray, a boat-trapping net made by Foster-Miller

== See also ==
- King Stingray, contemporary Aboriginal Australian band
