= Stingray (Stingray episode) =

- Stingray episode
- Episode no.: Episode 1
- Directed by: Alan Pattillo
- Written by: Gerry & Sylvia Anderson
- Cinematography by: John Read
- Editing by: David Lane
- Production code: 1
- Original air date: 7 September 1964

Guest character voices
- Don Mason and Ray Barrett as WSP Commanders; Robert Easton and David Graham as Aquaphibians

Episode chronology
← Previous —	Next → "Emergency Marineville"

"Stingray", alternatively titled The Pilot, is the first episode of Stingray, a British Supermarionation television series created by Gerry and Sylvia Anderson and produced by their company AP Films (APF) for ITC Entertainment. Written by the Andersons and directed by Alan Pattillo, it was first broadcast in Japan on 7 September 1964 and in the UK in October.

The series follows the World Aquanaut Security Patrol (WASP), an organisation responsible for policing the Earth's oceans in the mid-2060s. Its flagship, Stingray, is a combat submarine crewed by Captain Troy Tempest, Lieutenant "Phones" and Marina, a mute young woman from under the sea. Stingray's adventures bring it into contact with underwater civilisations – some friendly, others hostile – as well as mysterious natural phenomena.

In the first episode, while investigating the unexplained destruction of a submarine, Troy and Phones discover that there is intelligent life on the ocean floor when they are captured by the forces of King Titan, tyrannical ruler of the underwater city of Titanica. Condemned to die, they are saved from execution by Titan's slave Marina, who joins the WASP and becomes the third member of the Stingray crew.

== Plot ==
While patrolling an ocean trench, the World Security Patrol (WSP) submarine Sea Probe is torpedoed and destroyed by a vessel resembling a mechanical fish. The WSP orders its marine branch, the World Aquanaut Security Patrol (WASP), to investigate. At Marineville, the WASP's headquarters on the West Coast of North America, Commander Shore assigns Captain Troy Tempest and navigator Lieutenant "Phones" to the mission.

Troy and Phones depart in Stingray, the WASP's flagship submarine, and proceed to Sea Probe's last known position. Troy, who has long suspected the existence of intelligent undersea life, believes a hostile force is responsible for the loss of Sea Probe and other vessels. As Stingray passes the island of Lemoy, Surface Agent X-2-Zero – an undersea spy operating from a house on the island – contacts his master King Titan, ruler of the ocean floor city of Titanica, to inform him of Stingray's approach.

On reaching the trench, Stingray is attacked by one of Titan's Mechanical Fish. Troy and Phones are captured by its crew of Aquaphibians – Titan's soldiers – and brought to Titanica. Troy is taken to Titan's throne room, where Titan tells him that their fate will be decided by Teufel, a captive fish that Titan worships as a god. Teufel turns his back on Troy, leading Titan to declare Troy and Phones enemies of Titanica and sentence them to death. On land, Stingray is presumed lost and Marineville prepares to retaliate by bombarding the trench with hydromic missiles.

Escorted by Marina, Titan's mute slave-girl, Troy and Phones are transferred to a Mechanical Fish for the journey to their execution site, the prison of Aquatraz. Marina betrays Titan and frees Troy, enabling him and Phones to overpower the Aquaphibian pilots. The trio use the Mechanical Fish to tow Stingray back to Marineville and the missile attack is aborted.

Over dinner with Commander Shore and his daughter, Lieutenant Atlanta Shore, Troy presents Marina as a new member of the Stingray crew. Atlanta, Troy's love interest, realises that she has gained a rival for his affections.

== Regular voice cast ==
- Ray Barrett as Commander Shore and King Titan
- Robert Easton as Lieutenant Phones and Surface Agent X-2-Zero
- Don Mason as Captain Troy Tempest
- Lois Maxwell as Lieutenant Atlanta Shore

== Production ==
The episode has no on-screen title but is referred to as "Stingray" in ITC documentation. It is also known as "Stingray (The Pilot)" or just "The Pilot". However, it was not devised as a true pilot because Lew Grade, APF's chairman and investor, had approved the series format before filming began. In his biography, Gerry Anderson said that the first episodes of APF's TV productions were called "pilots" for the sake of convenience. Filming commenced in early June 1963, with the incidental music being written on 17 and 18 July and recorded on 9 and 10 August.

The Andersons' script stated that Sea Probe's destruction was to be followed by a montage of shots showing a telecommunications tower and a telephone switchboard, accompanied by voiceovers representing various callers attempting to contact Washington, D.C. about the loss of the submarine. In the finished episode, this was replaced by a simple cut to an establishing shot of the World Security Patrol headquarters, based within a skyscraper. According to the script, this was to be a "futuristic" windowless structure modelled on a telephone exchange building. Due to a continuity error, the lead WSP Commander is voiced by Don Mason in the scene set at WSP HQ, then Ray Barrett during a videophone conversation with Commander Shore. In later episodes the character is voiced by David Graham or Robert Easton.

The ocean floor backdrops for the windows of Titan's throne room were created using back projection. According to Gerry Anderson, the hydromic missile launch towers were modelled on rocket launch towers at Cape Kennedy. Scale models representing seabed-mounted interceptor torpedoes were adapted from model Bloodhound missiles manufactured by Airfix, while a squadron of WASP search-and-rescue aircraft were originally Revell Convair B-58 Hustlers. The name of the undersea prison to which Troy and Phones are being transferred (Aquatraz) was inspired by Alcatraz Prison.

The episode has had several adaptations in other media. In 1965, its story was combined with those of "Deep Heat" and "Subterranean Sea" to create "Into Action with Troy Tempest", one of three Stingray EP audio plays released by APF's sister company Century 21 Records. The episode was also included in two compilation films. At some point in 1963, APF combined it with the episodes "An Echo of Danger", "Raptures of the Deep" and "Emergency Marineville" to create a 99-minute Stingray feature presentation. Originally screened for Japanese TV executives, this was broadcast in a condensed form under the title "The Reunion Party" on BBC Four in 2008. The second film, The Incredible Voyage of Stingray, was a made-for-TV feature produced by ITC New York in 1980. Combining the first episode with "Plant of Doom", "Countdown" and "The Master Plan", this was one of 13 compilations from various Anderson series to be shown on US syndicated and cable TV during the 1980s.

== Broadcast and reception ==
The series' world premiere was in Japan, where this episode first aired on Fuji Television on 7 September 1964. The episode's Japanese title translated as "Undersea Fish God".

In the UK, the episode was first broadcast on 4 October 1964 on the Anglia, ATV London, Border, Grampian and Southern franchises of the ITV network, followed by ATV Midlands, Channel and Westward on 6 October and Tyne Tees on 9 October. It was repeated in multiple regions on 25 December 1964 and had its first showing on Granada on 30 December.

In 1992, the BBC acquired broadcast rights to the series and began a repeat run on BBC2 in the autumn, starting with the pilot on 11 September. Viewing figures for the episode were 3.36 million, the channel's sixth-largest audience for that week.

=== Critical response ===
In a contemporary review, Tony Gruner of Kinematograph Weekly wrote that the episode had the "bounce and push of some of the old Hollywood movies", with an "American brashness [...] on par with" both its writing and the puppet cast's "transatlantic accents". An article in Variety stated that the writing "deployed itself with the minimum of words"; it also called the direction "first rate".

TV Zone magazine regards the episode as the best of Stingray, describing it as an "excellent introduction to the series" with "phenomenal puppetry and effects work". It praises the "gripping" story – "pure comic-book fiction, with its quasi-Atlantean civilisation and sci-fi trappings" – as well as the "economy" of the writing: "In a few short scenes, we're introduced to all the heroes and villains, and the fascinating character of Marina." The publication is critical of some aspects, calling Titan a "one-note" villain with no motive other than "being evil", and Troy's trial by Teufel "just bizarre".

According to Simon Archer and Marcus Hearn, the episode recycles several plot elements from Fireball XL5's first episode, "Planet 46". This, they argue, "re-affirms many of [Stingray's] links" to its precursor. They also suggest that the scene in which Surface Agent X-2-Zero quickly converts his dining room into a communications post "uncannily foreshadows" a scene in the film Goldfinger (1964). Ian Fryer argues that while most of the episode is played seriously, consisting of "male-dominated situations of peril" similar to APF's earlier series, Marina's arrival marks a change in tone: "Suddenly the emotional palate of the series has grown larger in ways that Fireball XL5 – and especially the all-male environment of Supercar – never attempted: romance is in the air."
