= Journey to the Far Side of the Sun =

1969 film by Robert Parrish

- US theatrical release poster
- Directed by: Robert Parrish
- Screenplay by: Gerry Anderson; Sylvia Anderson; Donald James
- Story by: Gerry Anderson; Sylvia Anderson
- Produced by: Gerry Anderson; Sylvia Anderson
- Starring: Roy Thinnes; Ian Hendry; Lynn Loring; Patrick Wymark; Loni von Friedl; Herbert Lom
- Cinematography: John Read
- Edited by: Len Walter
- Music by: Barry Gray
- Production company: Century 21 Cinema Productions
- Distributed by: The Rank Organisation (UK); Universal Pictures (International)
- Release dates: 27 August 1969 (US); 8 October 1969 (UK)
- Running time: 101 minutes
- Country: United Kingdom
- Language: English

Journey to the Far Side of the Sun (also known by its original title Doppelgänger) is a 1969 British science fiction film directed by Robert Parrish and starring Roy Thinnes, Ian Hendry, Patrick Wymark, Lynn Loring, Loni von Friedl and Herbert Lom. It was written by Gerry and Sylvia Anderson and Donald James, and produced by the Andersons for their company Century 21. Set in the year 2069, the film concerns a joint European-NASA mission to investigate a newly discovered planet which lies directly opposite Earth on the far side of the Sun. The mission ends in disaster and the death of one of the astronauts, following which his colleague realises that the planet is a mirror image of Earth in every detail, with a parallel and duplicate timeline.

The film was the first major live-action production by the Andersons, known for their Supermarionation television programmes such as Thunderbirds. Having originally conceived the story as a television play, they were encouraged by their employer Lew Grade to pitch the project as a feature film to Jay Kanter of Universal Pictures. Though underwhelmed by the script, Kanter greenlit the film after the Andersons hired Parrish as director. Journey to the Far Side of the Sun was shot between July and October 1968 at Pinewood Studios and on location in England and Portugal. During filming, the working relationship between Parrish and the Andersons became strained, while creative disagreements between Gerry Anderson and business partner John Read, the director of photography, led to Read's resignation from Century 21. To distinguish the film from their puppet productions, the Andersons wrote adult themes into the script, although cuts were required for the film to be awarded an A certificate by the British Board of Film Censors.

The film premiered in August 1969 in the United States and October 1969 in the United Kingdom. It performed poorly at the box office during its initial theatrical run but has since garnered a cult following. Journey to the Far Side of the Sun has received mixed reviews from critics; while the special effects and production design have been praised, some commentators have judged the parallel Earth premise to be clichéd and uninspired. Various plot devices and imagery have been viewed as pastiches of other science fiction films, such as 2001: A Space Odyssey (1968). Several members of the cast went on to appear in UFO, the Andersons' first live-action TV series, which also re-used many of the film's props.

== Plot ==
In 2069, the European Space Exploration Council's (EUROSEC) Sun Probe discovers a planet in the same orbital path as Earth on the far side of the Sun. The findings are transmitted to a power in the East by double agent Dr Hassler. Tracing the messages to Hassler's laboratory, Security Chief Mark Neuman corners the scientist and kills him.

EUROSEC director Jason Webb convinces NASA representative David Poulson that the West must send a crewed mission to the planet before Hassler's allies in the East. NASA astronaut Colonel Glenn Ross and EUROSEC astrophysicist Dr John Kane are assigned to the mission. After undergoing training at the EUROSEC Space Centre in Portugal, Ross and Kane blast off in the spacecraft Phoenix. They are put into an artificial hibernation for the outbound journey, with "Heart-Lung-Kidney" machines maintaining their vital functions. Three weeks later, Phoenix reaches the planet and Ross and Kane are revived. Scans for life prove inconclusive, so the astronauts decide to make a surface landing in their auxiliary craft, Dove. During its descent, Dove is damaged in a thunderstorm and crashes in a mountain range, seriously injuring Kane. The astronauts are picked up by a human rescue team, who tell Ross they have landed near Ulaanbaatar, Mongolia. It appears that Ross and Kane have returned to Earth, and they are flown back to the Space Centre.

Neuman and EUROSEC official Lise Hartman question Ross, who denies that he aborted the mission. Later, Kane dies of his injuries. Ross discovers that people are now driving on the wrong side of the road and that he can no longer read printed text because it is all backwards. He comes to the realisation that he is indeed on the unknown planet, a Counter-Earth where every detail is a mirror image of his Earth. Ross's wife Sharon refuses to accept his claims, but Webb is convinced when Ross demonstrates his ease in reading reflected text and Kane's post mortem examination reveals that his internal organs are on the "wrong" side of his body. Ross theorises that the two Earths are parallel and that his counterpart from this world is experiencing similar events on his Earth. Webb proposes that Ross retrieve the flight recorder from the orbiting Phoenix and return home.

EUROSEC builds a new Dove designed to be compatible with the reversed technologies of Phoenix. Modifications include reverse-polarisation of the electrical circuits. Ross blasts off in the spacecraft, which he has named Doppelganger, and attempts to dock with Phoenix. However, the electrical systems malfunction, crippling the spacecraft and causing it to fall back towards the Space Centre. EUROSEC are unable to correct the fault and Doppelganger crashes into a parked spacecraft, killing Ross and starting a chain reaction that destroys much of the Space Centre. All records of Ross's presence on the Counter-Earth are lost in the disaster.

Years later, Webb, now using a wheelchair and in a much-diminished mental state, is admitted to a nursing home, where he sees his reflection in a mirror. He rolls forward quickly, trying to touch his doppelganger, but crashes into the mirror and dies.

== Cast ==
- Roy Thinnes as Colonel Glenn Ross
- Ian Hendry as Dr John Kane
- Patrick Wymark as Jason Webb
- Lynn Loring as Sharon Ross
- Loni von Friedl as Lise Hartman
- Franco De Rosa as Paolo Landi
- George Sewell as Mark Neuman
- Ed Bishop as David Poulson
- Philip Madoc as Dr Pontini
- Vladek Sheybal as Dr Beauville
- George Mikell as Dr Bernhardt Brisson
- Herbert Lom as Dr Kurt Hassler

=== Uncredited cast ===
- Keith Alexander as Launch Controller
- Edward Cast as Security Vaults Sergeant
- Anthony Chinn as Air-Sea Rescue Crew Member
- Cy Grant as Dr Gordon
- Annette Kerr as Nurse
- Martin King as Dove Service Technician
- Basil Moss as Assistant Doctor
- Norma Ronald as Pam Kirby
- Arnold Diamond as Clavel, Paris delegate
- John Stone as London Delegate
- Peter Burton and Nicholas Courtney as Medical Techs
- Constantine Gregory and Jeremy Wilkin as Launch Control Techs

== Production ==
=== Development ===
In 1967, producer Jay Kanter arrived in London to set up a European office for Universal Pictures. Kanter was open to funding promising film ideas, so Lew Grade, the Andersons' employer and financial backer, set up a meeting for Gerry Anderson to pitch a story about a hypothetical "mirror" Earth. On the inspiration for the film, Anderson said: "I thought, rather naively, what if there was another planet on the other side of the Sun, orbiting at exactly the same speed and the same size as Earth? That idea then developed into the planet being a replicated Earth and that's how it ended up, a mirrored planet".

The earliest version of the script was written by Tony Williamson. At one point it ran to 194 pages, enough for a three-hour film. The Andersons had conceived the story as a one-hour drama for Associated Television, but Sylvia thought the premise "too good for a television play" and suggested making it as a feature film instead. John Read, the Andersons' business partner, proposed the title "Doppelgänger". According to Gerry, the term "...means 'a copy of oneself', and the legend goes that if you meet your doppelganger, it is the point of your death. Following that legend, clearly, I had to steer the film so that I could end it illustrating the meaning of that word". Responding to claims that the tone was overly "dark", Anderson said that he wanted the film to have an interesting premise.

Kanter was dissatisfied with the Williamson script, so the Andersons' began to re-write it themselves and brought in Donald James as a co-writer to improve the characterisation. The revisions included substantial changes to the parts set on the mirror Earth, essentially causing the characters of Ross and Kane to switch roles. In the original script, Ross was blinded in the Dove crash, while Kane survived but was declared insane. A structural defect in Doppelganger caused it to burn up in the atmosphere with Kane inside, and the film ended with Kane's wife, the Rosses and Webb attending his funeral.

Despite James's efforts, Kanter remained unenthusiastic. However, he agreed to finance the film provided that the Andersons chose a "bankable" director who met with his approval. Gerry's first choice was David Lane, who had directed Century 21's puppet films Thunderbirds Are Go (1966) and Thunderbird 6 (1968), but Kanter wanted an experienced mainstream director. After weeks of searching, in June 1968 the Andersons hired Robert Parrish, who had co-directed Casino Royale (1967). According to Gerry, Parrish "told us he loved the script and said it would be an honour to work with us. Jay Kanter gave Bob the thumbs up and we were in business". Anderson said that while the negative critical response to Casino Royale raised questions about Parrish's ability, Doppelgänger could not have been made without him: "It wasn't a question of, 'Will we get on with him?' or, 'Is he the right man?' He was a name director, so we signed him up immediately".

=== Casting ===
Leading the cast was American actor Roy Thinnes as Colonel Glenn Ross of NASA. Thinnes was cast on the basis of his starring role in The Invaders and his resemblance to Paul Newman. In the Andersons' script, Ross's first name was Stewart and he was the first person on Mars. In a 2008 interview, Thinnes said of the film: "I thought [it] was an interesting premise, although now we know that there isn't another planet on the other side of the Sun, through our space exploration and telescopic abilities. But at that time it was conceivable, and it could have been scary". To reflect the script's characterisation of Ross as a heavy smoker, Thinnes went through numerous packets of cigarettes over the course of the production, to the detriment of his health. In September 1969, The Age reported that the actor would demand a non-smoking clause for his next film: "He smokes about two packets a day, but the perpetual lighting up of new cigarettes for continuity purposes was too much".

Ian Hendry was cast as Dr John Kane, a British astrophysicist and head of the Phoenix project. In his biography, Anderson recalled that Hendry "was always drinking" and was visibly intoxicated during the filming of the Dove crash sequence: "... he was pissed as a newt, and it was as much as he could do to stagger away. Despite all that, it looked exactly as it was supposed to on screen." In the original script, Kane's first name was Philip and he had a wife called Susan. Scenes deleted from the finished film showed the character pursuing a romance with EUROSEC official Lise Hartman, played by Loni von Friedl, whom the Andersons cast in Berlin.

Ross's wife Sharon was played by Lynn Loring. The role had first gone to either Gayle Hunnicutt or Tisha Sterling, but the original actress quit early in the production after falling ill. This led to the casting of Loring, Thinnes' then wife and a star of TV series The F.B.I. An earlier version of the script had the character appear in a nude scene, written into the film to distinguish it from the Andersons' previous productions. In a 1968 interview in the Daily Mail, Gerry expressed a desire to change the public's perception of Century 21, saying that his company had been "typecast as makers of children's films". On rumours that the British Board of Film Censors (BBFC) would give the film an X certificate for mature content, he stated that it was Century 21's desire to "work with live artists doing subjects unsuitable for children". The finished film replaced the nude scene with milder shots showing Sharon stepping into and out of a shower. A subplot concerns the Rosses' attempts to conceive a child and Glenn's discovery that Sharon has been taking birth control pills. The original script described Sharon as the daughter of a United States senator and had her begin an affair with EUROSEC public relations officer Carlo Monetti. In the finished film, this character, played by Franco De Rosa, is renamed Paulo Landi and appears only briefly; the affair is implied in one scene but not explored further. In a deleted scene, Glenn finds Paolo and Sharon in bed together at the Rosses' villa and throws them both into a swimming pool.

Patrick Wymark played Jason Webb, the director of EUROSEC. Wymark was cast for his performance as antiheroic businessman John Wilder in the TV dramas The Plane Makers and The Power Game, which were liked by the Andersons. Publicity material described the character as "John Wilder (2069 model)". According to Gerry, Wymark's heavy drinking caused him to slur his lines: in one scene, the actor "had to list these explanations ... and on take after take he couldn't remember that 'two' followed 'one'. We had to do it over and over again". Anderson's biographers, Simon Archer and Marcus Hearn, consider Wymark's portrayal of Webb to be the film's standout performance. The original script described Webb as a former Minister of Technology who is romantically involved with his secretary, Pam Kirby (Norma Ronald, who had played Wilder's secretary in The Plane Makers and The Power Game). This subplot was one of several that were cut to avoid an X certificate.

The supporting cast included George Sewell, Philip Madoc and Ed Bishop, who respectively played EUROSEC operations chief Mark Neuman (Mark Hallam in the original script), Dr Pontini, and NASA representative David Poulson. Sewell and Madoc had both appeared in The Power Game. Poulson was to have been played by Peter Dyneley, but the producers thought that he bore too strong a resemblance to Wymark and re-cast the role, concerned that scenes with Dyneley and Wymark would cause audiences to confuse the characters of Poulson and Webb.

=== Filming ===
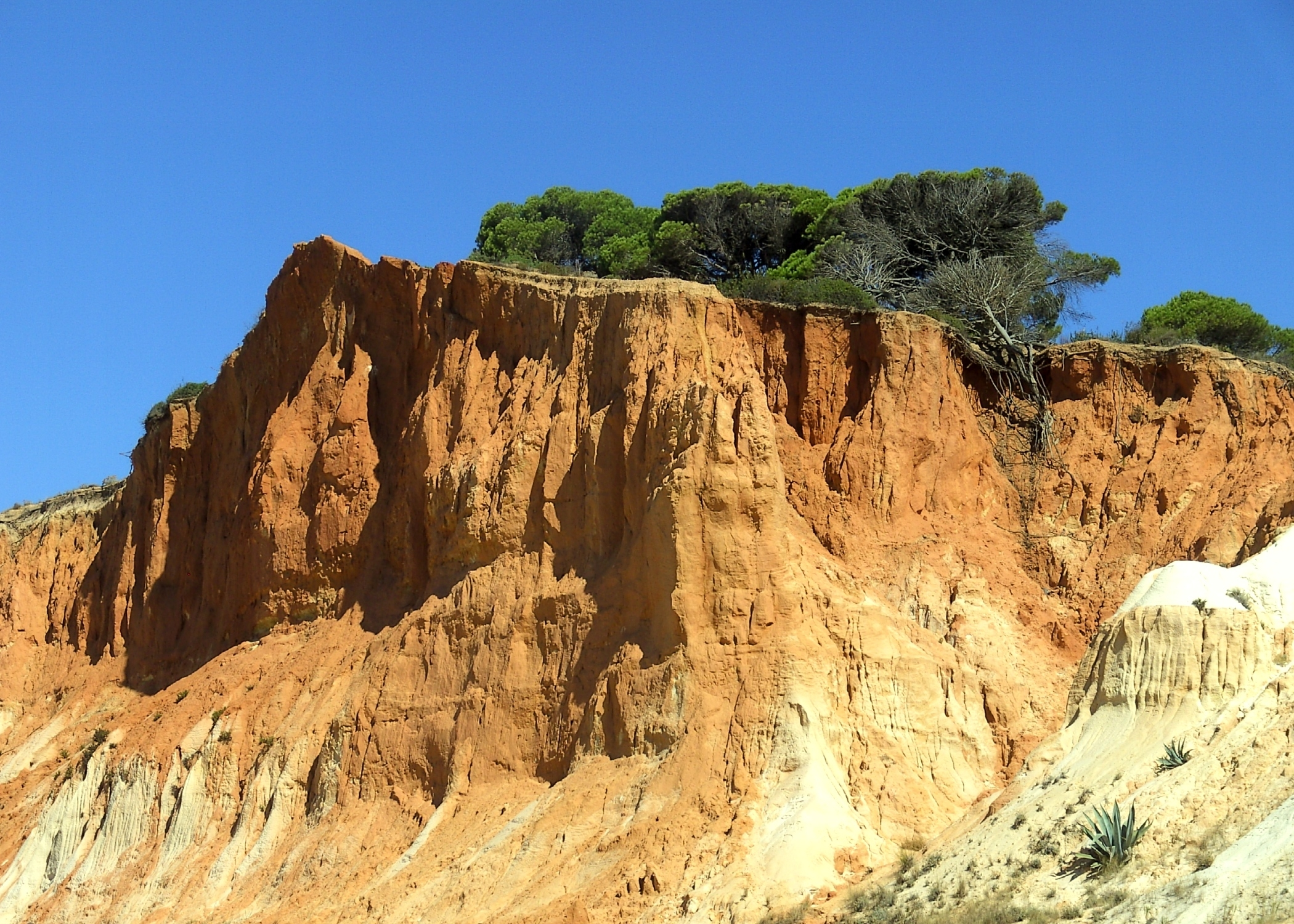
Location shooting was conducted in Albufeira, Portugal.

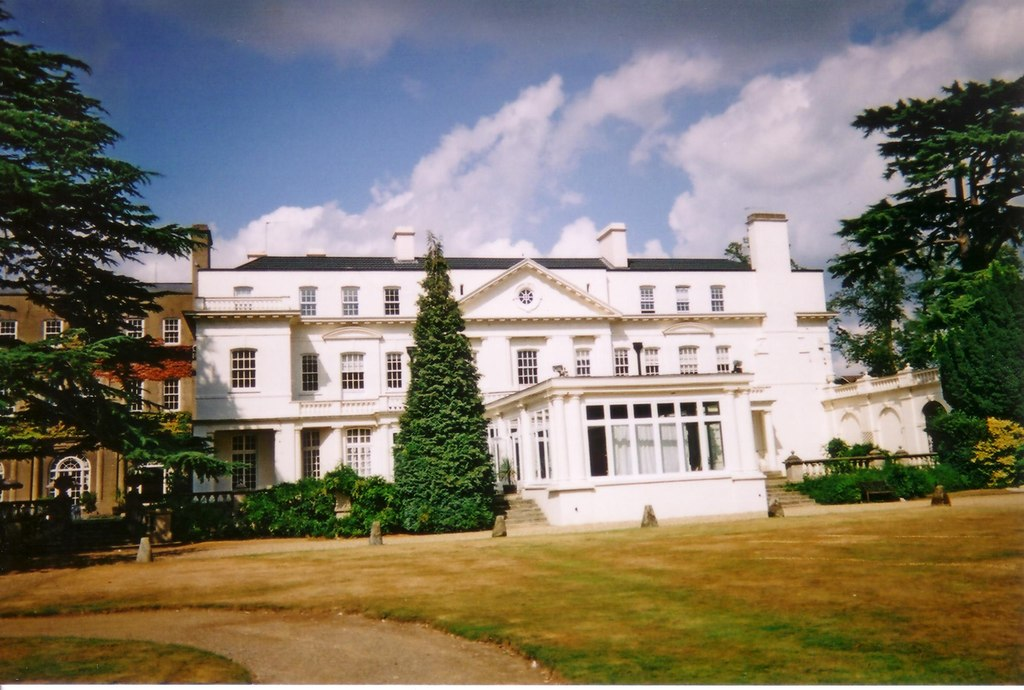
The closing scenes were filmed at Heatherden Hall in Iver Heath.

No TV monitors were used in the videoconference scene. Instead, the crew employed set alterations and forced perspective to reduce costs.

Filming began on 1 July 1968 at Pinewood Studios and ended on 16 October. The exterior of the EUROSEC Headquarters was represented by Neptune House in Borehamwood, Hertfordshire (now part of BBC Elstree Centre), while Heatherden Hall appeared as the nursing home where the elderly Jason Webb resided. In September, the crew travelled to Albufeira in Portugal for location shooting. Shortly after their arrival, Marcelo Caetano succeeded the incapacitated António de Oliveira Salazar as Prime Minister of Portugal. Parrish was concerned that this political instability might hold up the shoot, so reduced the filming schedule from one month to two weeks.

To create an illusion of a mirror Earth, the crew reversed the film negatives using a process called "flop-over". This technique spared the production considerable time and money building specially "reversed" props and sets and organising road closures to film cars driving on the "wrong" side of the road. However, it meant that scenes set on the Counter-Earth required careful planning and rehearsal with the cast and crew. It also resulted in a number of continuity errors: for example, the "Heart-Lung-Kidney" machines aboard Phoenix are first shown connected to Ross and Kane's left wrists, then their right.

The crew had difficulty creating a scene in which the EUROSEC board hold an international videoconference on high-resolution viewing monitors. Due to the high cost of colour TV at the time of production and the need to avoid black and white to reflect the film's futuristic setting, instead of using real viewing monitors the crew cut screen-sized gaps in a wall and positioned the actors playing the conference delegates behind them. Silver paper was added to reflect the studio lights and simulate a high-resolution image, with altered eyelines creating the illusion that each delegate is looking into a camera. Archer and Hearn praise this scene as an example of how Anderson "proved once again that his productions were ahead of their time".

As filming progressed, Anderson and Parrish came into conflict. Anderson said that Kanter was brought in more than once to mediate between them: "[Sylvia and I] both knew how important the picture was to our careers, and we both desperately wanted to be in the big time". At one point, Parrish refused to film a number of scenes, saying that he would only end up deleting them. According to Anderson, when he reminded Parrish of his contractual obligations, the director loudly announced to the cast and crew: "Hell, you heard the producer. If I don't shoot these scenes which I don't really want, don't need and will cut out anyway, I'll be in breach of contract. So what we'll do is shoot those scenes next!" In his biography, Anderson stated that his one regret about the film "[was] that I hired Bob Parrish in the first place". Sylvia described Parrish's direction as "uninspired. We had a lot of trouble getting what we wanted from him".

Parrish also clashed with Thinnes over the actor's refusal to have his hair cut a certain way for the scenes set on the Counter-Earth. Thinnes, whose hair had already been repeatedly styled, later decided that this was merely Parrish's way of asserting authority, having received a letter from a friend warning him that Thinnes could be difficult to work with. Gerry Anderson said that his own relationship with Thinnes was awkward, but that he liked the actor's performance.

Other scenes led to disagreements within Century 21. For a scene depicting Lise Hartman (Loni von Friedl) taking a shower, cinematographer John Read did the lighting in silhouette as instructed by Parrish. Gerry Anderson, who had intended the scene to show Friedl nude, demanded a reshoot, insisting that Read honour his obligations not only to Parrish as director, but also to the producers. According to Sylvia, "Gerry was very keen to show that he was part of the 'Swinging Sixties' and felt that seeing a detailed nude shot – as he visualised it – was more 'with it' than the more subdued version".

Another dispute arose when Read filmed shots of the Phoenix spacecraft model using a hand-held camera. In his biography, Anderson recalled: "I knew enough about space travel to know that in a vacuum a spacecraft will travel as straight as a die ... [Parrish] told me that people were not familiar with space travel and therefore they would expect to see this kind of movement". Read refused to reshoot the scenes, stating that Parrish's instructions took precedence over Anderson's. He resigned from both the production and Century 21 at the request of the Andersons and Reg Hill, his fellow company directors. Anderson elaborated: "Clearly, John was in a difficult position. I do now understand how he must have felt, but in my heart I feel he couldn't play a double role".

=== Design and effects ===
Dove (right) exits Phoenix. The film's effects have been well received.

The film's special effects were produced at Century 21 Studios on the Slough Trading Estate under the direction of Derek Meddings. More than 200 effects shots were filmed. The design of the Phoenix spacecraft was based on the Saturn V rocket. During filming, the six-foot-long (1.8 m) scale model unexpectedly caught fire and had to be completely rebuilt. For realism, the launch sequence was shot in the studios' car park against the actual sky.

Century 21 built a full-sized Dove module prop in Slough. However, it could not be used for the film due to an agreement between Pinewood Studios and the National Association of Theatrical Television and Kine Employees, which stated that all Pinewood film props were to be made in-house. The prop was destroyed, and although the Pinewood carpenters built a replacement, Anderson considered it inferior to the original.

Meddings also oversaw the construction of several futuristic land vehicles operated by EUROSEC. These included three six-wheeled utility vehicles, which were built from Mini Moke chassis by a Feltham-based company, and three cars modelled on Ford Zephyr Zodiacs. Fitted with dummy gull-wing doors, the adapted Fords were constructed by Alan Mann Racing under the supervision of Len Bailey.

Commenting on the film's effects, Martin Anderson of Den of Geek describes the Phoenix command module as "beautifully ergonomic without losing too much NASA-ness" and the Dove lander as "a beautiful fusion of JPL gloss with classic lines". He regards the Phoenix launch as Meddings' finest work prior to Moonraker (1979). Archer and Hearn describe the sequence as "one of the most spectacular" of its kind produced by Century 21.

=== Music and titles ===
Composer Barry Gray, who wrote the music for all of Century 21's productions, said that his score for this film was his favourite. The score was recorded over three studio sessions held between 27 and 29 March 1969. The first session used a 55-member orchestra, the second 44, and the third 28.

The sequence showing Ross and Kane's journey to the Counter-Earth was accompanied by a piece titled "Sleeping Astronauts", featuring an ondes Martenot played by French ondiste Sylvette Allart. Archer and Hearn describe this piece as "one of the most enchanting" ever written by Gray, adding that the soundtrack as a whole evoked a "traditional Hollywood feel" which contrasted with the film's futuristic setting.

The title sequence, set inside Dr Hassler's laboratory, was accompanied by a spy theme. This was inspired by the character's undercover activities, which he performs using an artificial eye containing a micro-camera. Archer and Hearn regard this as a stylistic imitation of James Bond films.

== Release ==
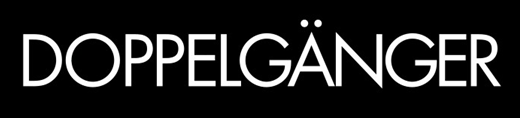
The original title, "Doppelgänger", as it appears in the film's European prints

UK poster, showing the original title

The completed film failed to impress either Universal or UK distributor The Rank Organisation. Rank delayed the film's release by over a year. On 26 March 1969, the BBFC passed the film with an A certificate, which allowed children under 11 to see the film provided that they were accompanied by a parent or guardian. To secure this rating, cuts to shots of contraceptive pills were required. Rank enquired whether the film could be cut further to secure a U certificate, removing the need for parental supervision; the BBFC rejected the idea, stating that this would cause the film to lose all narrative sense.

The film was distributed by Rank in Europe and Universal in the US and Australia. While Rank kept the original title, Universal, judging that non-Europeans would be less familiar with the term "doppelganger", renamed the film "Journey to the Far Side of the Sun" – the title by which it is now more commonly known. Simon Archer and Stan Nicholls argue that while this title gives a clearer explanation of the plot, it lacks the "intrigue and even poetic quality of 'Doppelgänger'".

After premiering in the US on 27 August 1969, the film had its UK debut on 8 October at the Odeon Cinema on Kensington High Street. It went on general release on 26 October, paired with Death of a Gunfighter to create a double feature. The film ran for less than a week in Odeon venues. A second round of US screenings began in Detroit on 1 November. Overall, the film performed poorly at the box office.

Two original 35 mm prints of the film are known to exist. One is kept by the British Film Institute; the other by Fanderson, the official Anderson fan club. While original prints give top billing to Ian Hendry, Universal's Journey to the... format credits Thinnes first. Some British prints feature an alternative version of the final scene with a short voice-over from Ross, repeating a line of dialogue the character says to Webb earlier in the film: "Jason, we were right. There are definitely two identical planets."

The film had its British TV premiere on 7 December 1974 on Granada Television. Some TV broadcasts of the film have shown an incorrectly flopped picture. This originated from a mistake made in the 1980s when an original print was being transferred to videotape: a telecine operator who was unfamiliar with the film believed that the Counter-Earth scenes had been flopped in error, so made a second flop to reverse it. This de-flopped picture, which became the standard for all TV showings, makes it appear that the Ross of the Counter-Earth has landed on the "normal" Earth.

=== Home media ===
Previously available on LaserDisc, the film was released on Region 1 DVD in 1998 and both Region 1 and 2 DVD (digitally remastered) in 2008. Prior to the 2008 release, the BBFC re-classified the film PG for "mild violence and language".

Blu-ray versions followed in 2015. The US Blu-ray release was by Universal Entertainment. The Australian release by Madman Entertainment features a transfer of Fanderson's original film print, an exclusive audio commentary by Gerry Anderson, and a double-sided sleeve, which enables the Blu-ray case to be stored under either of the film's titles.

== Reception ==
Since its original release, the film has had a mixed response from critics. Simon Archer and Stan Nicholls consider it a cult film. The film has a 40% approval rating on Rotten Tomatoes.

=== Contemporary reviews ===
There were some great sequences and the special effects were outstanding. Perhaps the mistake I made was in insisting that we incorporate "Gerry's view of the future", where everybody is squeaky clean and everything is sparkling and shining and sanitised. Unfortunately that isn't what most people see as humanity's natural state ... Star Trek was similar but succeeded because it had a philosophy attached to it. It also had believable people with good characterisation.

— Gerry Anderson's views on the film

Rating the film "poor", The Monthly Film Bulletin described the theme as "more abstruse" than that a of a typical science fiction feature. It added: "the intricacies are insufficiently clarified, and Robert Parrish's direction is so leaden-footed, that despite the explosive finale the film as a whole is simply dull." The film was also negatively received by the Daily Mirror, which called it "corny", as well as by David Robinson of The Financial Times, Derek Malcolm of The Guardian and Margaret Hinxman of The Sunday Telegraph. Writing for The Times, critic John Russell Taylor praised it as "quite ingenious" but suggested that the title and pre-release publicity gave away too much of the plot.

In the US, Howard Thompson of The New York Times wrote that the film "never really gets off the ground" and "remains a little too civilised and restrained for its own good." He praised the "crispness" of certain dialogue, along with the visual style and Parrish's direction, but argued that the story deserved "a larger movie, at least one with more stratospheric sweep and suspense". Judith Crist of New York magazine described Journey to the Far Side of the Sun as "a science fiction film that comes up with a fascinating premise three-quarters of the way along and does nothing with it." She commended the film for being "nicely gadget-ridden", as well as raising questions about the conflict between science and politics, but criticised the editing. Variety magazine considered the plot confusing, equating the Dove crash to the quality of the writing: "Astronauts take a pill to induce a three-week sleep during their flight. Thereafter the script falls to pieces in as many parts as their craft."

While The Miami News and the Montreal Gazette regarded the film as better than average for its genre, The Pittsburgh Press dismissed it as "a churned out science fiction yarn ... Let's hope there's only one movie like this one", and ranked it among the worst films of the year. The Gazette added that while the film gets worse towards the end, "until then it's a reasonably diverting futuristic melodrama." A review in the Southeast Missourian stated that "in today's space terminology [the film] almost rates as science – and pure reportage through film. Still, it evolves as a fascinating motion-picture entertainment." In 1975, Jeff Rovin called Journey to the Far Side of the Sun "confusing but colourful" and praised its "superb" effects.

=== Retrospective reviews ===
Gary Gerani, co-writer of Pumpkinhead, ranks Journey to the Far Side of the Sun 81st in his book Top 100 Sci-Fi Movies, calling the film "enigmatic" and a "fine example of speculative fantasy in the late '60s". He praises Thinnes' and Wymark's performances, as well as the characterisation, the film's secondary themes (such as adultery, infertility and corruption) and the "Fourth of July-style" special effects. Sylvia Anderson suggested that American audiences, who were less familiar with Century 21's puppet productions than their British counterparts, were more enthusiastic about the film. She explained: "It was all too easy to compare our real actors with our puppet characters and descriptions such as 'wooden', 'expressionless', 'no strings attached' and 'puppet-like' were cheap shots some of the UK critics could not resist ... Typecasting is the lazy man's friend, and boy, were we typecast in Britain". In 1992, she said of the film: "I saw it on TV a couple of years ago and I was very pleased with it. I thought it came over quite well". To Chris Bentley, the film is a "stylish and thought-provoking science fiction thriller".

TV Guide magazine gives the film two stars out of four, calling it a "strange little film" with an "overwritten script". Glenn Erickson of DVD Talk considers Journey to the Far Side of the Sun a "good" film but writes that it "takes an okay premise but does next to nothing with it. We see 100 minutes of bad drama and good special effects, and then the script opts for frustration and meaningless mystery". He criticises the cinematography, comparing it to that of Thunderbirds in the sense that the characters "stand and talk a lot", while defining the script as "at least 60 per cent hardware-talk and exposition ... How people move about – airplane, parachute, centrifuge – is more important than what they're doing". In a review for Den of Geek, Martin Anderson praises the direction and effects but states that the film's "robust and prosaic" dialogue sits "ill-at-ease with the metaphysical ponderings". He criticises some of the editing, noting that many of the effects shots have "that 'Hornby' factor, slowing up the narrative unnecessarily". He rates the film three stars out of five, summing it up as "an interesting journey with many rewards".

The Film4 website gives the film two-and-a-half stars out of five, summing it up as "an occasionally interesting failure". The review praises the effects and costume design but judges the subplots about Hassler's treachery and the Rosses' marital problems to be unnecessary distractions from the main story. It also questions the originality of the premise and the depth of the writing: "Anderson's has to be the cheapest alternate Earth ever. Whereas audiences might expect a world where the Roman Empire never fell or the Nazis won World War II, here the shocking discovery is that people write backwards. That's it". A similar view is expressed by Gary Westfahl, who describes the setting as "the most boring and unimaginative alien world imaginable".

Reviewing the film for Sight & Sound in 2021, Robert Hanks called the story "compellingly weird" even if "the pacing is dreadful [...] the dialogue wince-making [and] the science utterly implausible." He also noted the film's inclusion of various "Anderson obsessions" like "huge supranational organisations, spies with bizarre gadgets, futuristic cars, and odd close-ups of hands performing intricate tasks", adding that it was "perhaps a shame Parrish didn't imprint himself more firmly on the material".

=== Interpretation ===
The ending scene has drawn comparisons to the visual style of 2001: A Space Odyssey. Glenn Erickson calls the film "infected with 2001-itis'", noting that the "feeble asylum patient" Jason Webb "sits in a wheelchair in a corridor resembling Dave Bowman's holding cell on the alien planet beyond the Star Gate."

Archer and Nicholls suggest as possible causes of the film's box office failure its "quirky, offbeat nature" and waning public interest in space exploration after Apollo 11. The topic of the Moon landing dominated a contemporary review in the Milwaukee Journal, which found similarities in the plot of Journey to the Far Side of the Sun: "... the spacemen find a few bugs in their 'LM' and crash on the planet. And do they ever have their hands full in getting back to Earth!" Suggesting that the performances are hampered by an excess of technical dialogue, the review concluded: "... the makers of this space exploiter may get lots of mileage at the box office, but Neil, Buzz and Mike did it better on TV."

It has also been suggested that 2001: A Space Odyssey and Planet of the Apes, both released the year before, set a high standard for Journey to the Far Side of the Sun and other films to follow. Erickson argues that Journey to the Far Side of the Sun is inferior to 2001 for presenting a "working future" that is still dominated by commercialism. Comparing the visual style to that of 2001, he notes similar use of "psychedelic" images and close-ups of human eyes but calls such imitation "fluff without any deeper meaning". Film4's review describes the final scene featuring the elderly Webb as "hell-bent on recreating the enigmatic finale of 2001 by using a mirror, a wheelchair and a tartan blanket." Rovin argues that the effects "[occasionally] outshine" 2001's", adding that it "attempts to kindle a profundity similar to that of [2001] in its abstract philosophising about the dichotomy of dual worlds, but fails with a combination of meat-and-potatoes science fiction and quasi-profound themes." He argues that Journey to the Far Side of the Sun is "neither a kid's film nor a cult film" but rules that "the elements that comprise the finished effort are more than individually successful."

Martin Anderson compares Journey to the Far Side of the Sun to other science fiction films like Solaris, identifying a "lyrical" tone to the dialogue. However, he concedes that the film "doesn't bear comparison with Kubrick or Tarkovsky", the directors of 2001 and Solaris. Douglas Pratt and the Institute of Contemporary Arts compare the film to "The Parallel", an episode of The Twilight Zone which sees an astronaut returning to Earth only to find it mysteriously changed, and realising that he has ended up in a parallel universe. S. T. Joshi likens the film's theme of duplication to the premise of Invasion of the Body Snatchers, in which a race of extraterrestrials called the Pod People abduct humans and replace them with alien doubles.

=== Legacy ===
Despite the film's failure, Grade gave the Andersons further commissions with live actors. The first of these was the TV series UFO, which began airing in 1970. Journey to the Far Side of the Sun is considered a precursor to UFO and has also been described as a "trial run" for the follow-up series, Space: 1999. Most of the cast went on to appear in UFO, notably Ed Bishop as the protagonist Colonel Ed Straker and George Sewell as his deputy, Colonel Alec Freeman. Many of the film's costumes, shooting locations and musical tracks were also re-used, along with props including the Phoenix and Dove miniatures and the EUROSEC ground vehicles. Neptune House appeared as the exterior of Harlington-Straker Film Studios, where SHADO, the organisation headed by Straker, is based. The recycled music included the tracks "Sleeping Astronauts" and "Strange Planet", the latter accompanying the series' end credits. Additionally, UFO's opening titles imitated the teleprinter shots which formed the basis of the film's title sequence.

A retrospective by IGN argues that the presentation of politics and economics in Journey to the Far Side of the Sun goes against the conventions of 1960s science fiction. This is reflected in UFO, whose characters "were constantly having to deal with the pressures of having to show progress under the scrutiny of accountants and elected officials, much the same way NASA was starting to in the US". On the links between the film and UFO, Martin Anderson makes another connection to Kubrick: "... the most interesting common ground between the two projects remains the bleak ending(s) and the slight flirtation with the acid-induced imagery and mind fucks of 2001".

== See also ==
- Another Earth, a 2011 film with a similar premise
- The Stranger, a 1973 TV film with a similar premise
- 1969 in film
- List of British films of 1969
- List of films set in the future
