= USS Stingray =

Submarine of the United States

Two submarines of the United States Navy have been named USS Stingray for the stingray.

- The first Stingray (Submarine No. 13), was a C-class submarine in commission from 1909 to 1919 that was renamed USS C-2 in 1911 and served during World War I.
- The second USS Stingray (SS-186) was a Salmon-class submarine in commission from 1938 to 1945 that served during World War II.

== See also ==
- For the fictional USS Stingray (SS-161), see Down Periscope.
- USS David R. Ray (DD-971), a Spruance-class destroyer, nicknamed "Sting Ray"
- Stingray (disambiguation)
