= Gary Miller (singer) =

English singer and actor (1924–1968)

- Born: Neville Goodall Williams; 3 May 1924; Blackpool, Lancashire, England
- Died: 15 June 1968 (aged 44); London, England
- Occupations: Singer, actor
- Years active: 1953-1968

Gary Miller (born Neville Goodall Williams; 3 May 1924 – 15 June 1968) was an English popular music singer and actor who achieved notability in the 1950s and 1960s. His career spanned only 15 years, before he died of a heart attack in 1968. He released 24 singles and six EPs on the Pye label between 1955 and 1967. Pye released a further compilation EP after his death.

== Career ==
Miller abandoned football for a stage and radio career and he began touring the UK variety stages in 1953. He had several Top 40 singles early in his career, his debut single in 1955, "The Yellow Rose of Texas" reaching No. 13 on the UK Singles Chart. The most successful was "Robin Hood" (the theme to The Adventures of Robin Hood) which spent 28 weeks in the chart, and peaked at No. 10, his only Top 10 hit.

Miller had a number of acting roles in the television series The Saint and Gideon's Way, and was a regular panelist on Juke Box Jury. He provided the singing voice for Troy Tempest in the Gerry Anderson series Stingray and recorded 'Aqua Marina', the end titles theme for the series. He also recorded vocals for two different versions of an ultimately-unused end titles theme for Thunderbirds. The song was later re-worked as 'Flying High' for the episode Ricochet; one of the original two versions appears on the Thunderbirds 2 compilation album.

Miller appeared on stage as Steven Kodaly in the 1964 production of She Loves Me, at the Lyric Theatre and on the cast album of that production. He also began appearing in the musical Come Spy with Me with Danny La Rue and Barbara Windsor, shortly before his death from a heart attack at his south London home.

He died shortly before production finished on an episode of The Saint, 'The People Importers', in which he was also playing a key part. The series' associate producer, Johnny Goodman, later remarked that Miller was "working night and day" as a consequence of his twin commitments, and that production on The Saint episode had to be completed with a double in place of the actor.

== Selected discography ==
=== Singles ===
Year	Title	Label	UK Singles Chart
1955	"The Yellow Rose of Texas"	Nixa	13
1956	"Robin Hood"	Nixa	10
1957	"Garden of Eden"	Pye Nixa	14
1957	"Wonderful, Wonderful"	Pye Nixa	29
1958	"The Story of My Life"	Pye Nixa	14
1961	"There Goes That Song Again" / "The Night is Young (And You're so Beautiful)"	Pye	29
