= Stingray (1964 TV series) =

British television series (1964–1965)

- Genre: Children's science fiction
- Created by: Gerry & Sylvia Anderson
- Written by: Gerry & Sylvia Anderson; Alan Fennell; Dennis Spooner
- Directed by: David Elliott; John Kelly; Alan Pattillo; Desmond Saunders
- Voices of: Ray Barrett; Robert Easton; David Graham; Don Mason; Lois Maxwell; Sylvia Anderson
- Music by: Barry Gray
- Opening theme: "Stingray"
- Ending theme: "Aqua Marina", sung by Gary Miller
- Country of origin: United Kingdom
- Original language: English
- No. of series: 1
- No. of episodes: 39

Production
- Producer: Gerry Anderson
- Cinematography: John Read
- Editors: David Lane; Harry MacDonald; Eric Pask
- Running time: 25 minutes
- Production companies: AP Films in association with ATV and ITC Entertainment
- Budget: £20,000 per episode

Original release
- Network: ITV
- Release: 4 October 1964 – 27 June 1965

Stingray is a British children's science fiction television series created by Gerry and Sylvia Anderson and produced by AP Films (APF) for ITC Entertainment. Filmed in 1963 using a combination of electronic marionette puppetry and scale model special effects, it was APF's sixth puppet series and the third to be produced under the banner of "Supermarionation". It premiered in October 1964 and ran for 39 half-hour episodes.

Set in the 2060s, the series follows the exploits of the World Aquanaut Security Patrol (WASP), an organisation responsible for policing the Earth's oceans. The WASP's flagship is Stingray, a combat submarine crewed by Captain Troy Tempest, navigator Lieutenant "Phones" and Marina, a mute young woman from under the sea. Stingray's adventures bring it into contact with various underwater civilisations, some friendly and others hostile, as well as strange natural phenomena.

In preparation for the series, APF moved to larger studios that it would continue to occupy for the remainder of the 1960s. Filmed on a budget of £1 million, Stingray was the first British TV series to be made entirely in colour, (Note: However, when the colour aspect was publicised in the 1960s this claim was protested by artist and puppeteer Francis Coudrill, who claimed to have made his cowboy puppet series The Stoopendus Adventures of Hank "in full colour" for Associated-Rediffusion several years previously.) a move intended to increase its appeal to the lucrative American market. The underwater sequences were filmed "dry" by shooting the sets through thin aquaria, while surface shots were filmed on water tanks incorporating lowered back walls to create artificial horizons. Stingray was the first Supermarionation series whose puppet characters had interchangeable heads showing a range of facial expressions.

Stingray was originally broadcast on the ITV network in the United Kingdom and in syndication in North America. The series has drawn a largely positive response from commentators, some of whom have compared its premise to the Cold War.

== Premise ==
Stingray, a nuclear-powered combat submarine, is the flagship of the World Aquanaut Security Patrol (WASP), a branch of the World Security Patrol (WSP) responsible for policing the Earth's oceans in the mid-2060s. (Note: Sources give the year as 2064 (Archer and Hearn, p. 88; Bentley 2001, p. 12) or 2065 (Sellers, p. 88). The episode "The Lighthouse Dwellers" is set in 2065 (La Rivière, p. 103). The episode "Eastern Eclipse" is set 12 months after "Star of the East" (Bentley 2008, p. 92).) Armed with "sting missile" torpedoes, it can travel at up to 600 knots (1,100 km/h; 690 mph) underwater and reach depths of over 36,000 feet (11 km; 6.8 mi).

The WASP is based in the self-contained city of Marineville, located several miles inland somewhere on the West Coast of North America. It is connected to the Pacific Ocean via a tunnel leading to an "ocean door", through which Stingray is launched. General quarters is sounded by rapid drumbeats played over the base's public address system. In emergency situations, the entire base can be lowered into underground bunkers via giant hydraulic jacks while fighter aircraft and interceptor missiles are launched to counter threats. WASP personnel acknowledge commands with the phrase "P.W.O.R." – short for "Proceeding With Orders Received".

Stingray is piloted by Captain Troy Tempest. He is paired with Southern navigator Lieutenant George Lee Sheridan, nicknamed "Phones" for his secondary role as Stingray's hydrophone operator. Troy and Phones board Stingray from the Marineville stand-by lounge by sitting on twin seats that are then lowered into the submarine via injector tubes. They answer to the "hoverchair"-using Commander Sam Shore, whose daughter, Lieutenant Atlanta Shore, works in the Marineville control tower and is enamoured of Troy.

The series begins with the WASP's discovery that the ocean floor is home to many advanced civilisations. Among these is the undersea city of Titanica, ruled by King Titan. Titan commands the Aquaphibians, a warrior race who possess a fleet of lethal submersibles called "Mechanical Fish". (Note: In tie-in media, they are called "Terror Fish" (Bentley 2008, p. 355).) In the first episode, Stingray is attacked by Titan's forces and Troy and Phones are captured. They are rescued by Titan's slave, Marina, a mute young woman from the undersea city of Pacifica who can breathe underwater. Marina defects to the WASP and becomes a permanent member of the Stingray crew. Troy becomes infatuated with her, making Atlanta jealous.

Furious at Marina's betrayal, Titan swears revenge on "terraneans" (land people) in general and Troy and the WASP in particular. However, his attempts to destroy Stingray and Marineville are always thwarted, often due to the incompetence of his henchman Surface Agent X-2-Zero. Titan's spy on land, X-2-Zero operates from the Pacific island of Lemoy, where he operates from an outwardly dilapidated house whose interior conceals vast banks of sophisticated surveillance and tracking equipment. Some episodes revolve around encounters with other races living under the sea or within the Earth, some friendly and others hostile, or investigation of natural phenomena. The final episode is a clip show in which Troy is named "Aquanaut of the Year" and past missions are recounted in flashback.

== Characters ==
=== WASP and allies ===
- Captain Troy Tempest (voiced by Don Mason): pilot of the WASP's flagship submarine, Stingray.
- "Phones" (voiced by Robert Easton): a WASP lieutenant, Stingray's navigator and hydrophone operator, and Troy's best friend. His real name, George Lee Sheridan, is mentioned in the series' publicity material but never spoken on-screen.
- Marina: a young woman from under the sea who joins the Stingray crew. She was enslaved by King Titan of Titanica but defects to the WASP in the first episode and quickly becomes Troy's love interest. She can breathe in or out of water and is mute like the rest of her race. (Note: Marina is voiced by Sylvia Anderson on two occasions: the TV episode "Raptures of the Deep" and the audio play "Marina Speaks" (Bentley 2008, p. 86). In "Raptures of the Deep", Troy experiences a hallucination in which Marina communicates with him telepathically. "Marina Speaks", in which the character narrates her origins, reveals that Marina is perfectly capable of speech, but forced to remain silent because of a curse that Titan placed on her people – should any one of them utter a word, another will die (Sangster and Condon, p. 722).)
- Commander Samuel Shore (voiced by Ray Barrett): head of Marineville. Paralysed from the waist down, he uses a hoverchair to move about. The cause of his disability is revealed in the episode "The Ghost of the Sea": as a security agent for an ocean mining platform, he was injured when the facility was attacked by a hostile submersible.
- Lieutenant Atlanta Shore (voiced by Lois Maxwell): Commander Shore's daughter, the assistant controller in Marineville Tower and Marina's rival for Troy's affections.
- Sub-Lieutenant John Horatio Fisher (voiced by Ray Barrett): the junior assistant controller in Marineville Tower. In the episode "Rescue from the Skies" he is seen training to be an aquanaut.
- WSP Commanders (voiced by Don Mason, Ray Barrett, Robert Easton and David Graham): three commanders based at WSP Headquarters in Washington, D.C. They appear in various episodes to brief Commander Shore and other WASP personnel.
- Admiral Jack Denver (voiced by David Graham): the president of the WASP's underwater research division. He went to college with Commander Shore and enjoys debating with him. He appears in the episodes "Loch Ness Monster" and "Set Sail for Adventure".
- "Doc" (voiced by David Graham): Marineville's doctor. He appears in the episodes "The Master Plan" and "Invisible Enemy".
- Aphony: Marina's father, ruler of the peaceful undersea city of Pacifica and its mute inhabitants. He appears in the episodes "Plant of Doom" and "Tune of Danger".
- Oink (voiced by David Graham): a seal pup that becomes Marina's pet after he saves the Stingray crew from a bomb in the episode "Sea of Oil".

=== Recurring villains ===
- King Titan (voiced by Ray Barrett): the tyrannical ruler of the underwater city of Titanica who wages war on the WASP.
- Surface Agent X-2-Zero (voiced by Robert Easton): Titan's inept agent on land, based in a dilapidated house on the Pacific island of Lemoy.
- The Aquaphibians (voiced by Robert Easton and David Graham): a race of undersea warriors who serve Titan. Their language resembles a series of gurgles.
- Teufel: Titan's pet, a large fish with supernatural powers that Titan keeps in a tank in his throne room and worships as a god.
- El Hudat and Abu (voiced by David Graham and Ray Barrett) : the dictator of the island state of Hudatvia, and his aide. They appear in the episodes "Star of the East" and "Eastern Eclipse".
- Grupa and Noctus (voiced by Ray Barrett and David Graham): a pair of undersea beings who appear in the episodes "A Nut for Marineville" and "Trapped in the Depths".

== Episodes ==
Episodes are listed in the order of original broadcast in the ATV London region.

No.	Title	Directed by	Written by	Original air date	Prod. code
1	"Stingray" (Note: The first episode has no on-screen title but is referred to as "Stingray" in documentation by ITC Entertainment (Archer and Hearn, p. 97).)	Alan Pattillo	Gerry and Sylvia Anderson	4 October 1964	1
When a World Security Patrol submarine is mysteriously destroyed, Troy and Phones are assigned to investigate. However, they are captured by the Aquaphibians and sentenced to death by King Titan of Titanica.
2	"Emergency Marineville"	John Kelly	Alan Fennell	11 October 1964	11
Marineville is targeted by a series of missiles fired from a seemingly uninhabited island.
3	"The Ghost Ship"	Desmond Saunders	Alan Fennell	18 October 1964	8
Commander Shore and Phones are captured by an undersea pirate who has turned an antique galleon into a submarine.
4	"Subterranean Sea"	Desmond Saunders	Alan Fennell	25 October 1964	12
The Stingray crew brave the perils of a newly discovered underground sea.
5	"Loch Ness Monster"	Alan Pattillo	Dennis Spooner	1 November 1964	13
Troy, Phones and Atlanta are sent to Scotland to solve the mystery of Nessie once and for all.
6	"Set Sail for Adventure"	David Elliott	Dennis Spooner	8 November 1964	30
While commanding a sailing ship, Admiral Denver is injured and loses his memory, leading him to turn his cannons on Stingray.
7	"The Man from the Navy"	John Kelly	Alan Fennell	15 November 1964	19
When Surface Agent X-2-Zero frames a navy captain for a sabotaged torpedo test, it is up to Troy to clear the man's name.
8	"An Echo of Danger"	Alan Pattillo	Dennis Spooner	22 November 1964	25
Agent X-2-Zero creates false underwater soundings in an attempt to mislead Phones and have him dismissed from the WASP.
9	"Raptures of the Deep"	Desmond Saunders	Alan Fennell	29 November 1964	16
Injured during a rescue mission, Troy passes out and hallucinates being the lord of an undersea palace.
10	"Titan Goes Pop"	Alan Pattillo	Dennis Spooner	6 December 1964	29
Titan orders X-2-Zero to kidnap a pop star who is visiting Marineville.
11	"In Search of the Tajmanon"	Desmond Saunders	Dennis Spooner	13 December 1964	28
While searching for the submerged temple of Tajmanon in Africa, Troy and Phones encounter an old enemy.
12	"A Christmas to Remember"	Alan Pattillo	Dennis Spooner	20 December 1964	37
In the run-up to Christmas, Phones is captured by an undersea warrior and forced to lay a trap for Troy, who has befriended the son of a dead WASP aquanaut.
13	"Tune of Danger"	John Kelly	Alan Fennell	27 December 1964	31
Agent X-2-Zero plots to bomb a jazz group's performance in Pacifica, Marina's undersea home city.
14	"The Ghost of the Sea"	David Elliott	Alan Fennell	3 January 1965	10
When a new cobalt mining rig is completed, Commander Shore relives the ordeal that left him paralysed.
15	"Rescue from the Skies"	Desmond Saunders	Dennis Spooner	10 January 1965	32
Agent X-2-Zero plants a bomb on Stingray while Lieutenant Fisher is using the vessel for target practice.
16	"The Lighthouse Dwellers"	David Elliott	Alan Fennell	17 January 1965	38
The Stingray crew investigate an abandoned lighthouse giving unexplained signals.
17	"The Big Gun"	David Elliott	Alan Fennell	24 January 1965	6
An undersea civilisation creates a weapon capable of obliterating the West Coast of America.
18	"The Cool Cave Man"	Alan Pattillo	Alan Fennell	31 January 1965	33
Troy falls asleep and dreams about meeting a group of undersea cavemen who have looted a vessel carrying radioactive cargo.
19	"Deep Heat"	John Kelly	Alan Fennell	7 February 1965	27
While investigating the disappearance of a deep-sea probe, Troy and Phones are captured by survivors of a ruined subterranean city.
20	"Star of the East"	Desmond Saunders	Alan Fennell	14 February 1965	24
Eastern dictator El Hudat wants to join the WASP but kidnaps Marina after he is overthrown in his home country.
21	"Invisible Enemy"	David Elliott	Alan Fennell	21 February 1965	26
Troy and Phones rescue an unconscious man who wakes up and uses a mysterious device to hypnotise everyone in Marineville.
22	"Tom Thumb Tempest"	Alan Pattillo	Alan Fennell	28 February 1965	21
Falling asleep on duty, Troy has a dream in which Stingray and her crew are inexplicably shrunk and uncover preparations for a meeting of all the WASP's undersea enemies.
23	"Eastern Eclipse"	Desmond Saunders	Alan Fennell	7 March 1965	36
Agent X-2-Zero frees former dictator El Hudat from the Marineville brig by replacing him with his twin brother.
24	"Treasure Down Below"	Alan Pattillo	Dennis Spooner	14 March 1965	5
When Stingray becomes trapped in a whirlpool, the crew face off against undersea pirates.
25	"Stand By for Action"	Alan Pattillo	Dennis Spooner	21 March 1965	17
Agent X-2-Zero poses as a film producer in his latest scheme to kill Troy.
26	"Pink Ice"	David Elliott	Alan Fennell	28 March 1965	22
Stingray is caught in a patch of pink slush created by an unidentified vessel.
27	"The Disappearing Ships"	David Elliott	Alan Fennell	4 April 1965	18
Three disused freighters mysteriously disappear shortly before they are due to self-destruct.
28	"Secret of the Giant Oyster"	John Kelly	Alan Fennell	11 April 1965	15
Troy is assigned to recover a giant pearl from an ocean cave, but the task is not as simple as it seems.
29	"The Invaders"	David Elliott	Dennis Spooner	18 April 1965	14
The Stingray crew are captured by undersea villains attempting to obtain information on Marineville's defence systems.
30	"A Nut for Marineville"	David Elliott	Gerry and Sylvia Anderson	25 April 1965	34
The WASP recruits an eccentric professor to develop a missile capable of neutralising an indestructible enemy submarine.
31	"Trapped in the Depths"	John Kelly	Alan Fennell	2 May 1965	35
Intending to destroy Marineville, an insane professor kidnaps Atlanta and hi-jacks Stingray.
32	"Count Down"	Alan Pattillo	Dennis Spooner	9 May 1965	9
Posing as a teacher for mute people in another plot to destroy Marineville, Agent X-2-Zero puts Marina in mortal danger.
33	"Sea of Oil"	John Kelly	Dennis Spooner	16 May 1965	3
While investigating the destruction of an oil platform with Troy and Phones, Atlanta is captured by undersea warriors.
34	"Plant of Doom"	David Elliott	Alan Fennell	23 May 1965	2
Outraged by Marina's defection to the WASP, Titan plots revenge by having X-2-Zero deliver a toxic plant to her father Aphony.
35	"The Master Plan"	John Kelly	Alan Fennell	30 May 1965	23
Troy is poisoned by Aquaphibians. Titan offers Marineville the antidote but demands Marina in exchange.
36	"The Golden Sea"	John Kelly	Dennis Spooner	6 June 1965	7
Titan plots to sabotage the work of scientists who are converting ocean minerals into gold.
37	"Hostages of the Deep"	Desmond Saunders	Alan Fennell	13 June 1965	4
An undersea being kidnaps a World Navy admiral and his wife.
38	"Marineville Traitor"	Desmond Saunders	Alan Fennell	20 June 1965	20
All the signs point to Commander Shore when a vital component is stolen from the Marineville control room.
39	"Aquanaut of the Year"	Alan Pattillo	Gerry and Sylvia Anderson	27 June 1965	39
Named "Aquanaut of the Year", Troy sits before a live TV audience as a selection of his adventures are recalled as flashbacks. (This is a clip show episode containing flashbacks to "Emergency Marineville", "Raptures of the Deep" and "Subterranean Sea".)

== Production ==
In late 1962, as production on Fireball XL5 drew to a close, Gerry Anderson decided that an underwater series was the next logical step for APF: "We had been on land and in space, so where could we go next? One possibility was underwater." He was inspired by childhood memories of U-boats in the Second World War, as well as by the mysteries of the ocean: "I was ... fascinated by trenches in the ocean that are as deep as mountains are high. There are features that man has never seen and pressures that are almost impossible to withstand. I began to wonder if there were areas of the Earth which had been little explored and felt justified in writing some wacky stuff."

APF's financial backer Lew Grade, who had bought the company after the success of Fireball XL5, approved the concept and commissioned 26 episodes. Anderson named the new series "Stingray" partly from a belief that stingrays are dangerous animals (in reality, they are docile), but also because it "seemed an exciting title." In preparation for the new series, APF, then based on the Slough Trading Estate's Ipswich Road, moved to a larger site on the nearby Stirling Road at a cost of £75,000. The new studios, built inside a converted factory unit, contained three 40-by-45-foot (12 m × 14 m) shooting stages: two for puppet filming and one for creating special effects. This arrangement allowed two episodes to be filmed simultaneously by separate crews.

Production began in spring or June 1963 and the series was completed in ten months. Each episode required an average of 11 days of puppet filming and five-and-a-half days of effects filming. The total cost of the production was approximately £1 million (£18 million in 2025). The budget per episode was £20,000, which enabled APF, whose earlier productions had been in black and white, to film in Eastmancolor. (Note: The opening credits refer to the colour process as "Videcolor".) Though Stingray would debut in black and white in its country of origin, the switch to colour filming was intended to increase the series' chances of being bought by a network in the US, where colour TV was already common. Sets were re-painted after NBC supplied APF with a list of colours believed to cause problems such as flaring or bleeding; according to Anderson, this was unnecessary because in Eastmancolor, a set "would appear on screen exactly as you had painted it." Some colours were avoided as they did not come out well in black and white, and models and sets were painted differently to ensure that they did not blend into each other. During the production of Stingray, APF became the UK's largest colour film consumer.

As filming progressed, Grade extended the series to 39 episodes. Around the time shooting on the final 13 episodes began, Don Mason and Robert Easton, who had understood that all of the voice cast were on the same pay, learnt that they were actually earning less than their co-star David Graham. They did not commit to the remaining episodes until they had re-negotiated their fees.

In a first for a Supermarionation series, Stingray included a Christmas episode, "A Christmas to Remember", and a clip show series finale, "Aquanaut of the Year". Before it could make the latter, APF required the approval of American TV producer Ralph Edwards, as the premise of the clip show borrowed creative elements from Edwards' This Is Your Life. When negotiations with Edwards took longer than expected, work began on an alternative clip show in which the main characters watch film recordings of some of Stingray's past missions. Production of that episode was halted when APF was given permission to proceed with "Aquanaut of the Year". The framing sequences from the abandoned episode were subsequently used to create a compilation film known as the "Feature Presentation" (see #Special episodes).

=== Characters and puppet design ===
In her 2007 autobiography, Sylvia Anderson, who had voiced the regular characters of Jimmy Gibson in Supercar and Dr Venus in Fireball XL5, wrote that she devised Marina as a mute so that she could take a break from voice acting and "concentrate on the scripts and characters". Her voice parts in Stingray were limited to uncredited guest roles in the episodes "Raptures of the Deep" (as Marina) and "A Christmas to Remember". Gerry Anderson said that Phones was inspired by memories of a sound engineer with whom he had once worked: "He spent so long with his headphones plugged in to various bits of equipment that he used to leave them on all the time, earning himself the nickname 'Phones'." Voice actor Robert Easton based the character's Southern American tones on his performance in the 1961 film Voyage to the Bottom of the Sea, in which he played a Southern radio operator. His voice for Surface Agent X-2-Zero was his impression of Peter Lorre, who had appeared in the same film. The Aquaphibians were voiced by Easton and Graham, their dialogue overlaid with a looped tape recording of bubbling water to create a gurgling effect.

The process of designing and making the puppets took four months and each of the main characters was sculpted in duplicate to allow episodes to be filmed in pairs. Some of the main characters were modelled on real-life actors; for example, Troy Tempest drew heavily on the looks of James Garner. Gerry Anderson said that he did not actually instruct the sculptors to base Troy on Garner; rather, he offered Garner's name simply to help them visualise the character, as they were struggling with his original brief (which merely called for Troy to be square-jawed and heroic-looking). Titan was based on a young Laurence Olivier, and Surface Agent X-2-Zero on either Claude Rains or Peter Lorre. Atlanta Shore has been likened to Lois Maxwell (who voiced the character), while Marina has drawn comparisons to both Ursula Andress and Brigitte Bardot. The Aquaphibians were modelled on an alien creature from the Fireball XL5 episode "XL5 to H_{2}O".

Stingray was the first Supermarionation series to feature puppets with glass eyes and poseable hands for increased realism. To make the puppets' eyes sparkle in a lifelike way, they were polished with silicon and illuminated by a small lamp. Another innovation was the creation of alternative heads to allow characters to display emotions: besides their "normal" heads, which had neutral expressions, the main characters could also be fitted with "smiling" and "frowning" heads. The female puppets' wigs were made of human hair; for the male puppets, mohair was used as it was softer and easier to style.

=== Effects design ===
Top: ocean shots were filmed in tanks containing dyed water. Each tank had an artificial horizon: the back wall had a low edge and the tank was overfilled to create a waterfall over it. Despite the complexity of this shot, in which Stingray and a Mechanical Fish leap out of the sea, it was filmed in one take. Bottom: rather than film underwater scenes in water, the crew "flew" puppets and models over a dry set with an aquarium mounted between the set and the camera to distort the lighting. Small fish were added to the aquarium to create forced perspective (top left), while air was blown across the set to make puppets' hair and clothing move as if in a current (right).

The Stingray submarine was designed by Reg Hill and built by Feltham-based company Mastermodels. The Marineville model was built in-house from wood and cardboard supplemented with pieces of model kits bought from a toy shop. It was lowered and raised using hydraulics. Most of the series' special effects were filmed on high-speed cameras with the footage slowed down in post-production to convey a sense of greater weight and scale.

For the underwater sequences, Anderson had originally envisaged filming inside a water tank, but the cost of the necessary cameras and equipment made this impractical. These scenes were ultimately filmed using a variation of a technique first used on Supercar: mounting a model ocean floor against a cyclorama and "flying" the puppets and models across the set on wires from an overhead gantry, while shooting the action through a thin aquarium to distort the lighting. Vegetable dye was added to the aquarium to make the water more noticeable. Several aquaria were used; constructed by a company that supplied fish tanks to London Zoo, they were re-built with thicker glass after one of them burst from the water pressure. The move away from black and white sometimes caused problems as build-ups of algae in the aquaria caused the water to change colour.

The illusion of scenes being set underwater was further enhanced by populating the aquaria with tropical fish of various sizes to create forced perspective. Food was dropped at various points around the tanks to keep the animals in shot. A disc with various portions cut out was placed in front of an overhead lamp and rotated to give the impression of light being refracted through the ocean, while the water in the aquaria was disturbed to create "rippling" effects. Wires were painted over to make them non-reflective and fans were used to simulate currents passing over puppets' hair and clothing. For the climax of the Stingray launch sequence, in which the vessel shoots out of an underwater tunnel, part of the set was painted onto the aquarium to conceal the air line that produced the accompanying rush of bubbles.

Ocean surface shots in Supercar and Fireball XL5 had been filmed in an outdoor tank, but for Stingray several tanks were built inside the studio. Among the challenges presented by these shots was the need to make the scale models appear realistic while filming on water, which cannot be miniaturised. In a 1980 interview, Derek Meddings, the series' special effects director, described the process as "designing the shot carefully [...] then shoot[ing] it at very high speed (to make movement slower and therefore seemingly vaster) and hope you didn't get huge globules of water that would give the game away." Models were controlled using wires, poles and underwater tracks and rigs. To make the water look blue, the crew first tried experimenting with various lighting effects; these proved inadequate, so the water was dyed blue instead. Various powders were used to create foam and whitewater.

Each tank incorporated an artificial horizon system whereby the back wall was built low and the tank was deliberately overfilled to create a waterfall, blurring the divide between the rim of the tank and the painted-sky backdrop. The effect was sustained by collecting the escaping water in troughs and pumping it back into the tank. To conserve studio space, some scenes were filmed in a wedge-shaped tank that was tailor-built to align with the camera's field of view. One of the effects shots in the series' opening titles shows Stingray and a pursuing Mechanical Fish leaping out of the ocean and then plunging back under water. Although this involved complex movements with the wire models which made the shot extremely difficult to film, the crew were successful on the first take.

Shots of aircraft in flight were filmed using a technique known as the "rolling sky", whereby the models were positioned in front of a painted-sky canvas and remained static while an illusion of movement was created by running the background in a continuous loop around a pair of electrically driven rollers. This system, devised by Meddings, made aerial shots easier to film as it took up very little studio space.

=== Opening and closing titles ===
The title sequence consists of a series of action shots featuring undersea explosions, Marineville going to red alert and Stingray doing battle with a Mechanical Fish. This is accompanied by dramatic narration from Commander Shore, who warns the audience to "Stand by for action! We are about to launch... Stingray!" before declaring that "Anything can happen in the next half-hour!" In the first 26 episodes, the title sequence opens in black and white before switching to colour; for the final 13 episodes, these first few seconds were replaced with all-colour footage.

Jim Sangster and Paul Condon, authors of Collins Telly Guide, praise the introduction, writing that "Of all the programmes we've looked at for this book, there is none with a title sequence as thrilling as Stingray." Anthony Clark of the British Film Institute calls the sequence "a mini-adventure in itself ... Children's TV had never before been this exciting." According to John Peel, the Stingray titles contrasted greatly with those of Fireball XL5 and Supercar, which were more "straight narrative openings". Peel also argues that Stingray influenced the "rapid cutting, pounding rhythms and extreme stylising" of later TV title sequences.

The series' closing titles focus on the love triangle between Troy, Marina and Atlanta. They feature Troy singing "Aqua Marina" – a ballad about his love of Marina, performed by Gary Miller with soprano backing vocals – while Atlanta gazes wistfully at his photograph.

== Broadcast and reception ==
In the UK, Stingray was first broadcast on 4 October 1964 in the Anglia, Border, Grampian, London and Southern regions. It premiered on Channel Television, ATV Midlands and Westward Television on 6 October and Granada Television on 30 December. First shown in black and white, it was broadcast in colour for the first time in December 1969. The series received little publicity but matched the successes of earlier Supermarionation productions. It was repeated on ITV in 1981 and on BBC2 in the early 1990s, with further repeats in the early 00s.

In the US, the series was first shown in 1965. Premiering in colour, it was syndicated across more than 100 markets with sales exceeding £3 million. It ran on the Sci-Fi Channel in 1994 as part of the Cartoon Quest block.

=== Critical response ===
Writing in 2006, Robert Sellers described Stingray as the "first truly classic Anderson show", whose special effects "have stood the test of time remarkably well." Daniel O'Brien, author of SF:UK: How British Science Fiction Changed the World, considers it to be "perhaps the archetypal Gerry Anderson series". Ranking the Anderson productions, Morgan Jeffery of Digital Spy places Stingray fourth, calling it "a kids' adventure serial of the highest order". Andrew Blair of Den of Geek believes that when grouped with Thunderbirds and Captain Scarlet and the Mysterons, Stingray is "the lesser of the Holy Triumvirate of Supermarionation [...] It's shorter than the former, and lighter than the latter, giving it a comparatively breezy feel." He also describes it as "inherently a matinee adventure, an inspiring rush of mild peril and jaunty escapades".

Comparing Stingray to the Andersons' earlier productions, media historian Marcus Hearn writes that the series essentially "[transfers] the format of Fireball XL5 to an underwater setting." Peel suggests that the decision to locate the action under the sea was influenced by the 1960s vogue for ocean exploration inspired by adventurers such as Jacques Cousteau and Thor Heyerdahl. Kim Newman describes Stingray as a "patrol show" in the same vein as Fireball XL5 and Supercar. Clark notes that Stingray, like its space-bound precursor, uses "some very simple elements – a four-square hero, a fantastic craft which lends its name to the show and a mix of fast-paced action and innocent humour." Despite praising Stingray, Peel considers Fireball XL5 and Thunderbirds to be more appealing. Peel also argues that of all Gerry Anderson's series, it is Stingray in which his preferred "tongue-in-cheek" style of humour is most prominent.

Mike Fillis of TV Zone magazine regards Stingray as less "ambitious" than Thunderbirds but compares its "self-awareness" favourably to the "po-faced rigidity" of Captain Scarlet. He also praises its "well-drawn" characters and describes the water-based special effects as "surprisingly elegant". Paul Cornell, Martin Day and Keith Topping, authors of The Guinness Book of Classic British TV, view the effects as more "realistic" than those of earlier Anderson series. Though judging many of the episodes to be "predictable and corny", they add that the series' "knowingness" and "love of character [...] made the whole thing charming." Sangster and Condon describe the episodes as "mercifully shorter" than those of Thunderbirds, creating "tighter plotting and an engaging simplicity". The music has also been praised: Glenn Erickson describes it as "corny retro" appropriate to the series' tone, while Clark calls it the "best underwater adventure music ever written".

Some commentators have been critical of the puppetry and effects. Paul Mavis of DVD Talk writes that the use of aquaria makes the underwater scenes look "a tad creaky" but believes that they compare well to contemporary feature film effects. Erickson writes that as in other Supermarionation series, the puppets' lack of mobility makes scenes feel "rather static". He notes that this limitation forces a large amount of movement to be kept off-screen: "Almost every capture by Aquaphibians ellipses difficult-to-film interaction, skipping straight to static talking scenes instead."

Sangster and Condon argue that, while Stingray is mainly for children, it was also the first Anderson series to have adult appeal. According to Jon E. Lewis and Penny Stempel, authors of Cult TV: The Essential Critical Guide, the series combines "kiddie-time exciting narrative action" with imaginative spoofs for the "more sophisticated". Stingray has also attracted a variety of comment on its presentation of race and sex. Newman argues that through its use of "silver- and green-skinned" undersea villains and the "odd caricatured Arab baddie", Stingray, like Thunderbirds, conveys "square, almost 1950s" attitudes towards race. Mavis rejects claims of racism, noting that not all of the series' underwater beings are malevolent and that this is acknowledged in character dialogue. Nicholas J. Cull views the mute Marina as an example of a female Anderson character who is "subordinate" to men, while Erickson argues that Atlanta's role as an assistant makes her a gender stereotype. Erickson also writes that the love triangle between Atlanta, Troy and Marina (which Blair describes as an "unusual development" for a children's series) creates a "mild sexist tension". Mavis disagrees that the series is sexist, noting that while Atlanta "doesn't do much here except answer the phone", Marina saves Troy's life on several occasions.

==== Cold War analysis ====
Cull observes that in its depiction of the WASP, Stingray is one of several Gerry Anderson series that "assume the development of world government and world security institutions" and "reflect the 1960s vogue for stories set in secret organisations with extravagant acronyms." He compares the premise of the series to the Cold War, noting the conflict between the WASP and the undersea races and the latter's use of spies to infiltrate human society. He believes that the episode "Marineville Traitor", which focuses on a hunt for an "enemy within", has an "especially strong Cold War flavour". Cull also notes that while the Anderson productions often present nuclear technology as a threat, Stingray also shows it in a positive light: for example, the series' eponymous submarine is nuclear-powered.

Sarah Kurchak of The A.V. Club suggests that compared to villains of earlier Anderson series, Titan and the Aquaphibians serve as a "more classically Cold War-style villainous Other". She adds that in the world of Stingray, "the battle lines between land and sea are clearly defined, the enemy is always watching, and the target of their aggression is always close to home." Kurchak also suggests that through his "multiple nightmares" about threats to Marineville, Troy embodies Cold War anxieties. O'Brien writes that Stingray contains "more than a touch of the Cold War ethos", arguing that Titan "could have easily belonged to an underwater branch of the Soviet Bloc."

== Adaptations ==
=== Comics and books ===
Stingray was featured in the Supermarionation tie-in comic TV Century 21 from its first issue, published by City Magazines/AP Films (Merchandising) in January 1965. The Stingray strip ran from TV Century 21 issue 1 (23 January 1965) to TV21 issue 189 (30 August 1968). It was originally by Alan Fennell and Ron Embleton; later contributors included Dennis Hooper, Gerry Embleton, and Michael Strand. The Stingray comics were reprinted in Polystyle Publications' Countdown in 1971 and 1972.

The 1960s also saw the publication of two original novels by Armada Books: Stingray and Stingray and the Monster, written by John William Jennison under the pseudonym "John Theydon".

=== Special episodes ===
After completing "Aquanaut of the Year", APF used the framing sequences from the original finale to create a TV film known as the "Feature Presentation". Written and directed by Alan Pattillo, this contains four complete episodes and was privately screened for Japanese TV executives visiting APF's studios. It has never been broadcast.

The framing material was rediscovered in late 2000 or early 2001 and later included on Stingray DVD releases. Several years later, BBC Wales and Granada International produced a condensed version of the Feature Presentation titled "The Reunion Party", which includes material from three episodes and was broadcast on BBC Four as part of a "Gerry Anderson Night" in 2008.

Title	Content	Original air date	Length
"Stingray (Feature Presentation)"	Four complete episodes: "Stingray", "An Echo of Danger", "Raptures of the Deep" and "Emergency Marineville"	Unaired	99 minutes
"The Reunion Party"	Clips from "Stingray", "An Echo of Danger" and "Emergency Marineville"	2 January 2008 (BBC Four)	29 minutes

=== Audio plays ===
To supplement the TV episodes, APF's sister company Century 21 Records released three audio plays on 7-inch EP record. Originally marketed as "mini-albums", these feature the TV voice cast and are each about 21 minutes long. They are included as special features on the UK Stingray DVD box set.

No.	Title	Written by	Produced by	Released	Code
1	"Into Action with Troy Tempest"	Alan Fennell	Desmond Saunders	October 1965	MA 101
While investigating the disappearance of a submarine, the crew of Stingray find themselves trapped in a subterranean sea that later becomes a desert. (This play is adapted from the TV episodes "Stingray", "Deep Heat" and "Subterranean Sea".)
2	"A Trip to Marineville"	Alan Fennell	Desmond Saunders	October 1965	MA 102
Troy gives a young boy a tour of Marineville.
3	"Marina Speaks"	Sylvia and Gerry Anderson	Desmond Saunders	October 1965	MA 104
Atlanta and Commander Shore discover a letter from Marina which reveals why she and her people are mute.

Anderson Entertainment, in association with Big Finish, has since produced audio adaptations of the novels Stingray and Stingray and the Monster, titled Operation Icecap and Monster from the Deep.

=== Compilation films ===
In the early 1980s, two compilation films were produced by ITC New York. These were made for American TV and later released on home video. They were televised as part of an ITC package branded "Super Space Theater", which also included compilations from other Supermarionation series. Each of the Stingray films consists of re-edited versions of four episodes. The second film, Invaders from the Deep, was broadcast as the first episode of movie-mocking comedy series Mystery Science Theater 3000 in 1988.

Title	Compilation of	Released	Length
The Incredible Voyage of Stingray	"Stingray", "Plant of Doom", "Count Down" and "The Master Plan"	1980	94 minutes
Invaders from the Deep	"Hostages of the Deep", "Emergency Marineville", "The Big Gun" and "Deep Heat"	1981	92 minutes

== See also ==
- List of early colour TV shows in the UK
- List of underwater science fiction works

== Footnotes and references ==
=== General and cited references ===
- Archer, Simon; Hearn, Marcus (2002). What Made Thunderbirds Go! The Authorised Biography of Gerry Anderson. London, UK: BBC Books. ISBN 978-0-563-53481-5.
  - Originally published as: Archer, Simon; Nicholls, Stan (1996). Gerry Anderson: The Authorised Biography. London, UK: Legend Books. ISBN 978-0-09-922442-6.
- Bentley, Chris (2017). Hearn, Marcus (ed.). Captain Scarlet and the Mysterons: The Vault. Cambridge, UK: Signum Books. ISBN 978-0-995519-12-1.
- Bentley, Chris (2001). The Complete Book of Captain Scarlet. London, UK: Carlton Books. ISBN 978-1-84222-405-2.
- Bentley, Chris (2008) [2001]. The Complete Gerry Anderson: The Authorised Episode Guide (4th ed.). London, UK: Reynolds & Hearn. ISBN 978-1-905287-74-1.
- Fryer, Ian (2016). The Worlds of Gerry and Sylvia Anderson: The Story Behind International Rescue. Fonthill Media. ISBN 978-1-78155-504-0.
- Hearn, Marcus (2015). Thunderbirds: The Vault. London, UK: Virgin Books. ISBN 978-0-753-55635-1.
- La Rivière, Stephen (2009). Filmed in Supermarionation: A History of the Future. Neshannock, Pennsylvania: Hermes Press. ISBN 978-1-932563-23-8.
- Lewis, Jon E.; Stempel, Penny (1996) [1993]. Cult TV: The Essential Critical Guide. London, UK: Pavilion Books. ISBN 9781857939262.
- Meddings, Derek (1993). 21st Century Visions. Surrey, UK: Paper Tiger Books. ISBN 978-1-85028-243-3.
- O'Brien, Daniel (2000). SF:UK: How British Science Fiction Changed the World. London, UK: Reynolds & Hearn. ISBN 978-1-903111-16-1.
- Peel, John (1993). Thunderbirds, Stingray, Captain Scarlet: The Authorised Programme Guide. London, UK: Virgin Books. ISBN 978-0-86369-728-9.
- Rogers, Dave; Marriott, John; Drake, Chris; Bassett, Graeme (1993). Supermarionation Classics: Stingray, Thunderbirds and Captain Scarlet and the Mysterons. London, UK: Boxtree. ISBN 978-1-85283-900-0.
  - Stingray volume originally published separately as: Rogers, Dave (1992). Stingray. London, UK: Boxtree. ISBN 978-1852831912.
- Sellers, Robert (2006). Cult TV: The Golden Age of ITC. London, UK: Plexus Publishing. ISBN 978-0-85965-388-6.
