= Dennis Spooner =

British writer (1932–1986)

- Born: 1 December 1932; Tottenham, Middlesex, England
- Died: 20 September 1986 (aged 53); Hertfordshire, England
- Occupations: Television writer, script editor
- Years active: 1960–1986
- Television: Coronation Street; No Hiding Place; Hancock; Fireball XL5; Stingray; Thunderbirds; Doctor Who; The Baron; Man in a Suitcase; The Avengers; The Champions; Department S Randall and Hopkirk (Deceased); Jason King; The Adventurer; Thriller; The New Avengers; The Professionals; Bergerac
- Spouse: Pauline Spooner
- Children: 3

Dennis Spooner (1 December 1932 – 20 September 1986) was an English television writer and script editor, known primarily for his programmes about fictional spies and his work in children's television in the 1960s. He had long-lasting professional working relationships with a number of other British screenwriters and producers, notably Brian Clemens, Terry Nation, Monty Berman and Richard Harris, with whom he developed several programmes. Though he was a contributor to BBC programmes, his work made him one of the most prolific writers of televised output from ITC Entertainment.

== Early life ==
Dennis was born in Tottenham, Middlesex. Following a brief spell as a professional footballer with Leyton Orient, Dennis completed his National Service with the Royal Air Force where he met Tony Williamson, with whom he formed an amateur writing partnership. During the 1950s Dennis returned to office work, and met and married Pauline.

Dennis did not desire a career in business and tried to break into the entertainment industry through performance, forming a comedy double act with Benny Davis, now a journalist living in Spain. They worked the London circuit but found only moderate success. Spooner then turned to writing and began selling half-hour comedy scripts to the BBC TV comedian Harry Worth. This eventually led to his writing several scripts for Coronation Street in 1960. He also contributed to the ITV police procedural series No Hiding Place and Ghost Squad as well as to the top-rated comedy series Bootsie and Snudge and to ATV's attempt to revive Tony Hancock's career in Hancock (1963).

Around this time Spooner met Brian Clemens; they struck up a partnership that lasted for the rest of Spooner's career. Clemens offered the writer work on The Avengers which was near the beginning of its nine-year run on ITV. Clemens bought two more of Spooner's scripts in that first year, making Spooner a fairly important writer during the Ian Hendry era of the programme.

== Children's TV ==
While his work in the spy fiction genre was the dominant feature of his writing career, Spooner also made several key contributions to children's drama. Most active in the genre from 1964 to 1966, he was a contributor to both the Gerry Anderson programmes and Doctor Who. It was to this genre that he returned at the end of his life. His final sale was the episode "Flashback" for the children's supernatural anthology, Dramarama.

=== Gerry Anderson series ===
After Spooner befriended Gerry and Sylvia Anderson in the early 1960s, they offered him a chance to write for their new Supermarionation puppet TV series, Supercar. Although these scripts were unused, Spooner successfully submitted scripts for the Andersons' next programme, Fireball XL5 in 1962. After two episodes there he received more substantial work on Stingray and Thunderbirds, writing almost 20 episodes for the two series. Although Thunderbirds was the last major work that he did for the Andersons, he returned in the 1970s to write single episodes of the more adult-oriented UFO and The Protectors. His final work for the Andersons was to write some additional scenes required to knit the first and 17th episodes of Space: 1999 into a feature-length release, known as Alien Attack. Spooner's work on the early Anderson programmes was also his first regular work for ITC Entertainment.

=== Doctor Who ===
Spooner worked on Doctor Who almost exclusively in the formative William Hartnell era. He served as script editor for 6 months from The Rescue to The Chase. By the time Spooner left, the only remaining original character was the Doctor himself and one of Spooner's major goals during this period was to prove that the programme could survive major cast changes. This was partly achieved through the gradual introduction of humour, as is evident in the scripts Spooner himself wrote. The BBC's episode guide notes that "it is for its innovative use of humour that The Romans will always be best remembered, and in this respect it represents a worthwhile attempt at finding new dramatic ground for the series to cover". It was a change that resounded with the public, helping an episode of The Romans to receive the highest-ever share in the history of the series.

Spooner was also responsible for helping to foster a new paradigm for the historical type of adventure. It was he who fully developed the notion of the pseudo-historical with his story The Time Meddler. A gag in the previous story, The Chase, had been that Daleks were responsible for the disappearance of the Mary Celeste. In The Time Meddler, however, the central plotline was that actual historical events were a backdrop for a battle between the Doctor and an alien opponent. In sustaining the notion for a full serial, Spooner gave birth to an approach to historical events that has continued through to the most recent series of the programme. The Time Meddler also represents the first time that another member of the Doctor's race, not yet identified as the Time Lords, appeared (other than his granddaughter, Susan).

Spooner also had significant experience in writing Dalek episodes. At the behest of the producer Verity Lambert, he and Terry Nation (also Survivors and Blake's 7) each wrote half of the longest Doctor Who serial in history, The Daleks' Master Plan. His final assignment on the programme was to solve problems with the script for the new Doctor, Patrick Troughton, in the serial The Power of the Daleks.

However, Spooner had already been pressed into service on another programme that Terry Nation was script-editing. Enticed by the prospect of working on a programme that would receive attention in the lucrative American market, Spooner left Doctor Who to help Nation write the majority of the scripts for The Baron in 1966.

== ITC ==
The move to The Baron was the start of Spooner's second and more creative period with ITC. Starting in 1967, he became a sort of "contracted freelancer": he was obliged to write 10 episodes a year for ITC, but he was not exclusively bound to the company.

After The Baron had a cool reception when broadcast by ABC on American television, the show ended its run in Britain. Spooner then turned to an old friend, the television writer Richard Harris, to help him in creating a new venture, Man in a Suitcase. However, the more significant partnership Spooner initiated in 1967 was with Monty Berman, an ITC producer with whom he launched a production company called Scoton Productions. Between 1967 and 1971 Berman and Spooner created The Champions, Department S, its spin-off Jason King, and Randall and Hopkirk (Deceased). None of these programmes lasted more than two series, yet they all survived in the public memory long enough to justify video and DVD releases decades later. Indeed, Randall and Hopkirk (Deceased) was re-imagined by television producers in 2000 for a two-series run. Spooner's time with these programmes revealed not just his great interest in spy fiction, but also his penchant for rewarding friendship. Many former writing partners, including Williamson and Harris, returned to work on Spooner's ITC creations.

Despite his heavy involvement with ITC, Spooner also availed himself of the non-exclusivity of the arrangement. From the late 1960s to the early 1970s he continued to submit scripts to ITV and the BBC. This allowed him to be one of the most prolific writers on The Avengers during the Tara King era, and to successfully submit scripts to Paul Temple and Doomwatch.

== Post-ITC career ==
After his contract with ITC lapsed, Spooner entered a period of genuine freelance work for the rest of his career. His scripts were accepted for series such as Bergerac and The Professionals. Nevertheless, as had been his motivation for joining The Baron—and, really, that of ITC director Lew Grade—Spooner still longed for some success in the United States. To this end he rejoined Brian Clemens. In 1973 Clemens had begun Thriller, an ATV/ITV anthological mystery series that was shown in the United States under the title ABC Mystery Theatre. Although Spooner wrote only two episodes, he was one of only two writers other than Clemens himself to have done so. When Clemens made his next assault on American television, The New Avengers, Spooner played a much larger role: he and Clemens wrote the overwhelming majority of the scripts. So great was Spooner's contribution to New Avengers that, if considered alongside his work for the parent programme, it makes him the third-most prolific writer for The Avengers, and second only to Clemens for the length of his association with the programme. While this gave Spooner the greatest continuous work of his latter career, neither it nor Thriller led to a long-term presence in the United States. He continued to try to break into the American market, but sold only one idea to a prime time network show: the third season Remington Steele episode "Puzzled Steele" gave story credit to Spooner, Clemens and fellow scriptwriter Jeff Melvoin.

== Bridge playing ==
Spooner was a well-known bridge player and wrote two books, Useful Hints for Useless Players and Diary of a Palooka. The contents of the latter often appeared first under a column of that name in the publication Popular Bridge Monthly. Spooner played at Harrow Bridge Club. He often added a subtle reference to bridge to his scripts, such as naming a villain who owned two nightclubs "Stayman" (after the Stayman convention).

== Family and death ==
Spooner and his wife Pauline had three children.

Having heart problems, Spooner died on 20 September 1986 after suffering a heart attack aged 53.

== Writing credits ==
| Production | Notes | Broadcaster |
|---|---|---|
| Coronation Street | "Episode #1.87" (1961) | ITV |
| The Avengers | 4 episodes (1961-8): "Girl on the Trapeze" (1961); "Please Don't Feed the Animals" (1961); "Split!" (1968); "Look – (Stop Me If You've Heard This One) – But There Were These Two Fellers..." (1968) | ITV |
| No Hiding Place | 4 episodes (1962): "A Job for Johnny" (1962); "Car in Flames" (1962); "Time to Kill" (1962); "Unfinished Business" (1962) | ITV |
| ITV Television Playhouse | "No Cause for Alarm" (1962) | ITV |
| Fireball XL5 | 9 episodes (1962-3): "Space Pen" (1962); "Space Vacation" (1963); "Robert to the Rescue" (1963); "Dangerous Cargo" (1963); "Mystery of the TA2" (1963); "Whistle for Danger" (1963); "Invasion Earth" (1963); "Faster Than Light" (1963); "Space City Special" (1963) | ATV |
| Hancock | "The Early Call" (1963) | ATV |
| Comedy Playhouse | 2 episodes (1963-4): "The Plan" (1963); "The Siege of Sidney's Street" (1964) | BBC1 |
| Foreign Affairs | "Episode #1.4" (1964) | ITV |
| Stingray | 13 episodes (1964–1965): "Loch Ness Monster" (1964); "Set Sail for Adventure" (1964); "An Echo of Danger" (1964); "Titan Goes Pop" (1964); "In Search of the Tajmanon" (1964); "A Christmas to Remember" (1964); "Rescue from the Skies" (1965); "Treasure Down Below" (1965); "Stand By for Action" (1965); "The Invaders" (1965); "Count Down" (1965); "Sea of Oil" (1965); "The Golden Sea" (1965) | ATV |
| Doctor Who | Script editor for 26 episodes of Season 2 (1965). 21 episodes (1964–1966): "The Reign of Terror", Parts 1-6 (1964); "A Land of Fear"; "Guests of Madame Guillotine"; "A Change of Identity"; "The Tyrant of France"; "A Bargain of Necessity"; "Prisoners of Conciergerie"; "The Romans", Parts 1-4 (1965); "The Slave Traders"; "All Roads Lead to Rome"; "Conspiracy"; "Inferno"; "The Time Meddler", Parts 1-4 (1965); "The Watcher"; "The Meddling Monk"; "A Battle of Wits"; "Checkmate"; "The Daleks' Master Plan", Parts 6 & 8-12 of 12, with the remaining episodes written by Terry Nation, 1965; "Coronas of the Sun"; "Volcano"; "Golden Death"; "Escape Switch"; "The Abandoned Planet"; "Destruction of Time"; "The Power of the Daleks", Part 1 of 6 (co-written with David Whitaker, 1966) - uncredited; "Episode 1" | BBC1 |
| Pardon the Expression | "The Little Boy Lost" (1965) | ITV |
| Thunderbirds | 6 episodes (1965–1966): "The Mighty Atom" (1965); "Vault of Death" (1965); "End of the Road" (1965); "Day of Disaster" (1965); "The Impostors" (1966); "Cry Wolf" (1966) | ATV |
| The Baron | 14 episodes (1966–1967): "Diplomatic Immunity" (1966); "Enemy of the State" (1966); "The Persuaders" (1966); "And Suddenly You're Dead" (co-written with Terry Nation, 1966); "There's Somebody Close Behind You" (co-written with Terry Nation, 1966); "Time to Kill" (1967); "A Memory of Evil" (co-written with Terry Nation, 1967); "You Can't Win Them All" (1967); "Masquerade", Part 1 of 2 (co-written with Terry Nation, 1966) - uncredited; "The Killing", Part 2 of 2 (co-written with Terry Nation, 1966) - uncredited; "The High Terrace" (1967); "The Edge of Fear" (1967); "Long Ago and Far Away" (1967); "So Dark the Night" (co-written with Terry Nation, 1966) | ITV |
| Man in a Suitcase | Creator, with Richard Harris, of series running 29 episodes (1967–1968) | ITV |
| The Champions | Creator, with Monty Berman, of series running 30 episodes (1968–1969); 3 episodes (1968–1969): "The Beginning" (1968); "The Search" (1968); "The Interrogation" (1969) | ITV |
| Department S | Creator, with Monty Berman, of series running 28 episodes (1969–1970) | ATV |
| Randall and Hopkirk (Deceased) | Creator, with Monty Berman, of series running 26 episodes (1969–1970) | ITV |
| UFO | "Destruction" (1970) | ITV |
| Doomwatch | 2 episodes (1970–1971): "Burial at Sea" (1970); "The Logicians" (1971) | BBC1 |
| Paul Temple | "Has Anybody Here Seen Kelly?" (1971) | BBC1 |
| Jason King | Creator, with Monty Berman, of series running 26 episodes (1971–1972); 3 episodes (1971–1972): "Wanna Buy a Television Series?" (1971); "An Author in Search of Two Characters" (1972); "That Isn't Me, It's Somebody Else" (1972) | ITV |
| The Adventurer | Creator, with Monty Berman, of series running 26 episodes (1972–1973) | ATV |
| The Protectors | "The Bodyguards" (1973) | ATV |
| Thriller | 2 episodes (1975–1976): "Terror from Within" (1975); "Fear Is Spreading" (1975) | ITV |
| Comedy Premiere | "What a Turn Up" (1975) | ATV |
| The New Avengers | 9 episodes (1976–1977): "Cat Amongst the Pigeons" (1976); "Target!" (1976); "Three-Handed Game" (1976); "Faces" (1976); "Gnaws" (1976); "Medium Rare" (1977); "Complex" (1977); "Forward Base" (1977); "Emily" (1976) | ITV |
| The Professionals | 2 episodes (1978): "Stake Out" (1978); "Rogue" (1978) | ITV |
| Bergerac | 3 episodes (1981–1983): "Portrait of Yesterday" (1981); "Late for a Funeral" (1981); "Clap Hands, Here Comes Charlie" (1983) | BBC1 |
| Hammer House of Mystery and Suspense | "And the Wall Came Tumbling Down" (1984) | ITV |
| Remington Steele | "Puzzled Steele" (1984) | NBC |
| Dramarama | "Flashback" (1986) | ITV |

| Preceded by David Whitaker | Doctor Who Script Editor; 1964–65 | Succeeded by Donald Tosh |
