= Alan Pattillo =

British television director (1929–2020)

- Born: 17 July 1929; Aberdeen, Scotland
- Died: 16 January 2020 (aged 90); Salisbury, Wiltshire, England
- Education: University of Aberdeen; University of Cambridge
- Occupations: Director, editor, script editor, writer
- Notable work: Thunderbirds; All Quiet on the Western Front

Alan Huchison Pattillo (17 July 1929 – 16 January 2020) was a British writer and director who worked on Supercar, Fireball XL5, Stingray, and Thunderbirds television series. He won an Emmy in 1979 alongside Bill Blunden for his film editing on All Quiet on the Western Front.

Pattillo died on 16 January 2020 at the age of 90 from complications of Parkinson's disease.

== Early life ==
Pattillo was born on 17 July 1929 in Aberdeen, Scotland. He had an older brother, John (1924–2022), who was a medical practitioner.

== Career ==
During the 1960s, Pattillo worked on several Gerry Anderson projects. He directed episodes of Four Feather Falls, Supercar and Fireball XL5. His work on the latter is regarded as having brought added sophistication to the direction of the series. Pattillo then worked again for Anderson on Stingray as director, before performing a number of roles on the next series from AP Films. For Thunderbirds Pattillo served as script editor, director, and writer. He directed four and wrote seven of the thirty-two episodes (including Attack of the Alligators!).

Aside from his work on Gerry Anderson projects, Pattillo had a varied career in the film industry. He provided the story for a 1967 Diana Rigg era The Avengers episode The Bird Who Knew Too Much, which The Times television review noted as being "quite striking". Pattillo worked as the sound editor on Nicolas Roeg's Performance (1970) and again worked with the director as film editor on Walkabout (1971). He was the sound effects editor on Alan Parker's Pink Floyd: The Wall (1979). His work on All Quiet on the Western Front (also 1979), saw him awarded an Emmy for film editing, an award he shared with Bill Blunden. He later worked as associate editor on the film Gandhi (1982) directed by Richard Attenborough.

== Personal life ==
Pattillo never married. He also never had children.

In January 2024, his former carer Allan Beacham pleaded guilty to stealing over £75,000 from him between 2017 and 2019. In June 2024, Beacham was sentenced to 3 years and 10 months in prison.
