= Alan Fennell =

British television writer and editor (1936–2001)

- Born: Alan Leslie Fennell; 10 December 1936 Essex, England
- Died: 10 December 2001 (aged 65) Maidstone, Kent, England
- Areas: Writer, Editor

Alan Leslie Fennell (10 December 1936 – 10 December 2001) was a British writer and editor best known for work on series produced by Gerry Anderson, and for having created the magazines TV Century 21 and Look-in.

Fennell wrote episodes of Fireball XL5 and Stingray and more than ten episodes of Thunderbirds including "30 Minutes After Noon". He also wrote for many comic strip adaptations and was the first editor of TV Century 21. Between himself and Dennis Spooner they wrote 36 episodes of Stingray. He also wrote a number of books, including a novelisation of the film Digby, the Biggest Dog in the World (1973) and two original novels based on the TV series Freewheelers published in 1972 by Piccolo/TV Times, entitled Freewheelers – Sign of the Beaver and Freewheelers – The Spy Game.

He died of cancer on his 65th birthday.
