= John Read (producer) =

British television producer

- Born: John Owen Read; 14 November 1920; Chalfont St Giles, UK
- Died: 13 April 2006 (aged 85)
- Occupations: Television producer; Cinematographer
- Years active: 1950–1980s
- Employer: AP Films (1950s–late 1960s)
- Notable credits: Thunderbirds Are Go; Doppelgänger
- Television: Supercar; Stingray; Thunderbirds; The Adventures of Rupert Bear

John Owen Read (14 November 1920 – 13 April 2006) was a British television producer, cinematographer, director and special effects artist.

Read was born in Chalfont St Giles. He is widely associated with the productions of Gerry Anderson. Having served as director of photography on Four Feather Falls (1960), Crossroads to Crime (1960), Supercar (1961–62), Stingray (1964–65) and Thunderbirds (1965–66), Read worked on the latter show's second series, the film Thunderbirds Are Go (1966) and the subsequent series Captain Scarlet and the Mysterons (1967–68) as associate producer. He returned to cinematography for the film Doppelgänger (1969). When filming clouds at 12,000 feet for Supercar, Read told Anderson that he only had one lung.

Read's other credits include the 1954 film Passenger to Tokyo and the 1970s TV series The Adventures of Rupert Bear (cinematographer), as well as the series Cloppa Castle and The Munch Bunch (producer). He is also known for producing and directing Here Comes Mumfie in 1975.

Read died in 2006, aged 85, after suffering injuries in a car crash. He had been diagnosed with cancer prior to his death.
