= Don Mason (actor) =

Canadian actor (1929 – 1980)

- Mason in The Forest Rangers (1964)
- Born: Donald Clark Mason; 8 September 1929; St. Thomas, Ontario, Canada
- Died: 20 January 1980 (aged 50); Mississauga, Ontario, Canada
- Occupation: Actor
- Years active: 1953–1980
- Known for: Stingray (1964–65)

Don Mason (8 September 1929 – 20 January 1980) was a Canadian actor. He was best known for his leading voice role in Stingray (1964–65) as Captain Troy Tempest.

== Selected filmography ==
- O.S.S. as Co-Pilot
- More Deadly than the Male (Film, 1959) as Narrator (voice)
- International Detective (TV series, 1961) as Brent/the Foreman
- Studio 4 (TV series, 1962) as 1st Officer
- Suspense (TV series, 1962) as Co-Pilot
- The Forest Rangers (1964) as Steve
- Stingray (1964–65) as Captain Troy Tempest (voice)
- The Marvel Super Heroes (1966) as Rick Jones and Hawkeye
- Noah's Animals (TV film, 1976) as Polar Bear (voice)
- King of the Beasts (TV film, 1977) as Polar Bear (voice)
- Last of the Red-Hot Dragons (TV film, 1980) as Polar Bear (voice)
