= TV Comic =

British comic book

- TV Comic, issue 1, published November 1951

Publication information
- Publisher: News of the World (1951–57); Beaverbrook (1957–60); TV Publications/Polystyle Publications (1960–1984)
- Schedule: Weekly
- Format: Ongoing series
- Genre: Adventure, Children's, Science fiction
- Publication date: 9 November 1951 – 29 June 1984
- No. of issues: 1,697

Creative team
- Artist(s): Martin Asbury, Geoff Campion, John Canning, Ron Embleton, Hal Foster, Gerry Haylock, Chick Henderson, Mike Lacey, Steve Maher, Neville Main, Bill Mevin, Mike Noble, Bill Titcombe, Keith Watson, H. Watts, Pat Williams
- Editor(s): Dick Millington, Robin Tucheck, John Lynott

TV Comic was a British weekly comic book published from 9 November 1951 until 29 June 1984. Featuring stories based on television series running at the time of publication, it was the first British comic to be based around TV programmes and spawned a host of imitators.

== Publication history ==
Originally started by News of the World, TV Comic was later sold to Beaverbrook Newspapers, and then to TV Publications in 1960 (which became Polystyle Publications in 1968).

The first issue ran to eight pages, with Muffin the Mule on the front cover. It also featured many other TV favourites of the day, including Mr. Pastry, Larry the Lamb, (Note: Toytown, originally written for radio, would not be adapted into a television series until 1956.) Tom Puss, Prince Valiant (Hal Foster reprint), Jack & Jill and Prudence Kitten.

In common with other British children's comics of the time, TV Comic absorbed other, less successful titles (including those of its competitors) during its run. These included: TV Land and TV Express (City Magazines) in 1962; TV Action (formerly Countdown) in 1973; Tom and Jerry Weekly (Spotlight Publications) in 1974, which unusually didn't change the contents of the publication at all, given that Tom and Jerry already featured on the front page of TV Comic at the time; and the short-lived Target in 1978.

Editors of TV Comic included Dick Millington (who also edited Pippin and created long-running TV Comic character Mighty Moth), Robin Tucheck, and John Lynott. Artists included Bill Titcombe, John Canning, Neville Main, H. Watts, Gerry Haylock, Mike Lacey, and Steve Maher.

=== Title changes ===
- TV Comic (1951–1973, issues #1–1132)
- TV Comic + TV Action (1973, issues #1133-1147, after absorbing TV Action)
- TV Comic (1973–1974, issues #1148-1181)
- TV Comic plus Tom & Jerry Weekly (1974, issues #1182-1201; after absorbing Spotlight Publications' Tom and Jerry Weekly)
- TV Comic (1974–1976, issues #1202-1291)
- Mighty TV Comic (1976–1977, issues #1292-1352)
- TV Comic (1977–1978, issues #1353-1392)
- TV Comic with Target (1978, issues #1393-1401, after absorbing Target)
- TV Comic (1978–1984, issues #1402-1697)

== Content ==
For the first decade of its existence, the publication was aimed explicitly at younger children. As well as Muffin the Mule (which ran for nearly 10 years—as the cover feature until 1955, then later as a half-page in black and white), other favourites from the 1950s that made appearances were Sooty, Coco the Clown, Noddy and Lenny the Lion. As the decade passed, so the comic began to acquire a slightly more "grown-up" feel, with stories such as Treasure Island, The Lone Ranger and Black Beauty all appearing for a time. Text stories also began to be featured, with religious themes such as "Jesus and the Bible".

TV Comic printed Doctor Who stories from 1964 to 1979 (except for the period between 1971 and 1973, when the strip was instead published in another Polystyle title, Countdown/TV Action). It also featured strip cartoons for the early puppet TV series produced by Gerry Anderson and AP Films—Four Feather Falls, Supercar and Fireball XL5—until Anderson's shows became the focus of a rival publication, TV Century 21.

The issues published in the 1960s are generally considered the most collectable in the comic's history. As well as Doctor Who and Anderson strips, other highly collectable material included Telegoons (which ran from 1963 to 1967), Space Patrol (from 1964 to 1965) and The Avengers (based on the TV series featuring John Steed; initially from 1965 to 1966 and again from 1968 to 1972).

A number of annuals and holiday specials were also issued over the years, including special editions concentrating on characters such as the Pink Panther and Tom and Jerry.

The only notable, collectable and original strips during TV Comic's latter years are arguably Battle of the Planets (drawn by former Dan Dare artist Keith Watson); these ran from 1981 to 1983.

== Format ==
From the start, TV Comic featured a mixture of full colour pages (usually the front and back covers and the centre spread) and black-and-white pages, a policy that continued throughout its history.

While generally always a steady seller, TV Comic endured a somewhat tempestuous latter decade. In 1976 (from issue 1,292) Polystyle relaunched the title as New Mighty TV Comic, switching to a large tabloid format on cheaper paper. However, although the pages were larger, the amount of content in each issue actually reduced, with the frames of many strips simply blown up to fit the new size. (A notable example was that the Doctor Who comic strip, previously two standard pages, became a single page with a significant drop in the number of frames.) The first two editions of the New Mighty TV Comic were accompanied by a smaller "Mighty Midget" supplement featuring reprints of previously published Doctor Who and Star Trek strips respectively.

This relaunch clearly failed to attract the sales increases that had been hoped; the comic dropped first "New" and then "Mighty" from the masthead after several months and reverted to a standard size (from issue 1,377) two years later. However, it was still printed very cheaply on newsprint and so appeared a poor offering in contrast to its competitors, especially Look-in. While the overall production quality eventually improved, the comic continued to rely heavily on reprints of older material, or re-using scripts from old strips with new characters.

The publication ultimately closed in 1984, after nearly 33 years, due to declining sales. With no other Polystyle title existing into which it could merge, TV Comic simply ceased publication without any printed warning of its impending discontinuation. The closest to this was that both The A-Team and the Tales of the Gold Monkey strips, which had been running until this point, concluded with frames stating "The End".

== Legacy ==
TV Comic remains the UK's longest-surviving example of an anthology weekly comic featuring licensed strips based on a range of television properties; it ultimately survived for more than 32 years. Its nearest rival, in terms of longevity, was Look-in, which ran for 23 years, ceasing publication in March 1994.

The challenge always faced by TV Comic, as well as by rivals such as Look-in and TV Century 21 was being able to promptly licence and produce strips based on whichever TV shows and characters were popular at the time. This was not always easy to do or maintain in the longer-term. Occasionally a much-hyped programmes would prove less successful with readers than had been originally expected; alternatively, licenses to particular shows were simply beyond their reach, held by other publishers. For example, in 1978, the nearest TV Comic could get to the successful TV series based on Marvel's The Incredible Hulk was to publish an original spoof strip, "The Incredible Bulk".

TV Comic also faced the long-term challenge of serving a diverse readership in terms of both age and interests, finding itself running strips about anthropomorphised animals alongside adaptations of action adventure shows more popular with teenagers.

TV Comic was succeeded by Poylstyle's BEEB, a weekly children's magazine focused specifically on the BBC's most popular programmes at the time and – somewhat belatedly – promoted as a BBC-orientated "answer" to ITV-focused Look-in. Although including far more feature-articles than TV Comic had ever done, the publication was still dominated by a diverse range of comic strips: from older-children's favourites such as Grange Hill and The Tripods to cartoons based on Bananaman and The Family-Ness. However, it appears that, by this point, Polystyle simply didn't have the commercial resources to continue publishing BEEB long-term. The title only survived 20 issues and, like TV Comic before it, disappeared without any warning.

Similar BBC tie-in magazine Fast Forward, published directly by the BBC themselves from 1989, survived somewhat longer—long enough, in fact, to incorporate sister title Number One, a pop-music magazine chiefly aimed at younger teenage girls. However, its six year run rather suggested that TV-based anthology comics were no longer sustainable.

Although numerous weekly, fortnightly and monthly comics based on television properties remain a significant area of magazine publishing in the UK today, most of the titles focus on specific properties, rather than many. Any remaining anthology titles opt to focus on similar shows, and are also aimed at very specific (usually younger) age-groups.

== Features ==
=== TV programmes ===
- Adam Adamant
- Animal Magic
- Astronut
- The A-Team
- The Avengers
- Barney Bear
- Basil Brush
- Battle of the Planets
- Bob Monkhouse's Mad Movies Featuring the Keystone Kops
- Bootsie and Snudge
- Bugs Bunny
- Buzby
- Cannon
- Captain Pugwash
- Catweazle
- Charlie's Angels
- Dad's Army
- Deputy Dawg
- The Dickie Henderson Family
- Doctor Who
- Droopy
- The Dukes of Hazzard
- Fireball XL5
- The Flaxton Boys
- Foo Foo and GoGo
- Four Feather Falls
- Grasshopper Island
- Hägar the Horrible
- How?
- The Inspector
- Ken Dodd's Diddymen
- Jack & Jill
- Kojak
- Larry the Lamb
- Laurel and Hardy
- Lenny the Lion
- Mr. Merlin
- Mr Pastry
- The Milky Bar Kid
- Muffin the Mule
- Noddy
- Orlando
- The Pink Panther Show
- Popeye
- Prudence Kitten
- Road Runner
- Rod Hull and Emu
- Roobarb
- Skippy the Bush Kangaroo
- Sooty
- Space Patrol
- Star Trek
- Supercar
- Tales of the Gold Monkey
- Target
- Tarzan
- The Telegoons
- Tom and Jerry

=== Others ===
- Arthur!
- The Bakers' Dozen
- Beetle Bailey
- Black Beauty
- Coco the Clown
- Dad
- The Incredible Bulk
- Lochy the Loch Ness Monster
- The Lone Ranger
- Mighty Moth
- Nellie and Her Telly
- The Range Rider
- TV Terrors – Cuthbert, Buttons and Monica, and their nemesis Hoppit
- Texas Ted
- Rudi Rabbit (1981–83)
- Treasure Island

== Notable issues ==
- Issue 1 (9 November 1951) First Muffin the Mule (drawn by Neville Main) cover. Prince Valiant (drawn by Hal Foster) begins a run that will last until issue 44 (5 September 1952).
- Issue 192 (9 July 1955) Sooty (drawn by Tony Hart) takes over full-time on the cover, although it had occasionally appeared there as a Special number since earlier in the year.
- Issue 267 (15 December 1956) First Enid Blyton Noddy strip begins. It starts off its two-year run on the cover, before finishing with issue 371 (13 December 1958).
- Issue 345 (14 June 1958) First Lenny the Lion (drawn by Bill Mevin) cover.
- Issue 384 (14 March 1959). The comic's longest-running strip, Mighty Moth (drawn by Dick Millington) appears for the first time (but never in strip form on the cover) and runs until the comic ceases publication.
- Issue 439 (14 May 1960) the strip adaptation of the first of three early Gerry Anderson-produced TV series, Four Feather Falls (drawn by Neville Main) begins, running until issue 564 (6 October 1962).
- Issue 444 (18 June 1960) The Lone Ranger (drawn by Mike Noble) begins, running until issue 507 (2 September 1961).
- Issue 456 (10 September 1960) First Popeye (drawn initially by Chick Henderson) cover. The strip had started with issue 449 (23 July 1960), but even after Popeye was dropped from the cover, the strip continued inside the comic into the 1980s.
- Issue 482 (11 March 1961) the last appearance of Muffin the Mule in TV Comic as he is quietly dropped from the pages in only a half-page black-and-white strip.
- Issue 483 (18 March 1961) another Gerry Anderson favourite, Supercar (drawn initially by H. Watts and later by Bill Mevin) starts. It runs until issue 667 (26 September 1964).
- Issue 508 (9 September 1961) The Range Rider (drawn by Mike Noble and Ron Embleton) begins, running until issue 658 (25 July 1964).
- Issue 565 (13 October 1962) the third and last Anderson strip to appear in TV Comic is Fireball XL5 (drawn by Neville Main), which runs until issue 672 (31 October 1964).
- Issue 619 (26 October 1963) Telegoons (drawn by Bill Titcombe) first appears, running until issue 787 (14 January 1967).
- Issue 668 (3 October 1964) Space Patrol (drawn by Bill Mevin), always in full colour in the centre pages, makes its first appearance and will run until issue 719 (25 September 1965).
- Issue 674 (14 November 1964) Doctor Who comic strip begins (initially drawn by Neville Main). Apart from a brief absence for a few issues at the end of 1969, it runs until issue 999 (6 February 1971) and then moves to Countdown comic.
- Issue 720 (2 October 1965) The Avengers (by Pat Williams) begins its first run, which will last until issue 771 (24 September 1966). The first Doctor Who colour centrespread appears (drawn by Bill Mevin; from issue 748, by John Canning).
- Issue 788 (21 January 1967) First Doctor Who cover (drawn by John Canning). This commenced a six-month period of Doctor Who and the Daleks covers, which are perhaps some of the most collectable issues.
- Issue 810 (24 June 1967) First Ken Dodd's Diddymen (drawn by Bill Titcombe) cover.
- Issue 877 (5 January 1968) The Avengers return, running until issue 1,078 (12 August 1972).
- Issue 909 (17 May 1969) First Tom & Jerry (drawn by Bill Titcombe) cover.
- Issue 1,058 (25 March 1972) Dad's Army (drawn by Bill Titcombe) begins its first run up to issue 1,100 (13 January 1973), after which it moves to TV Action.
- Issue 1,133 (1 September 1973) TV Action merges with TV Comic. Dad's Army returns until issue 1,275 (22 May 1976); Doctor Who also returns (drawn by Gerry Haylock and later by Martin Asbury).
- Issue 1,292 (18 September 1976) Relaunch with first tabloid-style issue of Mighty TV Comic. Free Doctor Who Mighty Midget comic book. Star Trek (Gold Key comics reprints) features until issue 1,382 (9 June 1978).
- Issue 1,377 (5 May 1978) Mighty TV Comic returns to its original format. Cover stars vary from Pink Panther to Charlie's Angels, Buzby and Scooby-Doo, among others.
- Issue 1,393 (25 August 1978) First TV Comic, Incorporating Target. Charlie's Angels begins (drawn by John Canning), running until issue 1,451 (5 October 1979).
- Issue 1,430 (11 May 1979) Final issue featuring Doctor Who. Since issue 1,386, the strip had consisted of John Canning reprints with the character of the Doctor re-drawn as his fourth incarnation, as played by Tom Baker in the TV series.
- Issue 1,530 (17 April 1981) Battle of the Planets (drawn by Keith Watson, and also by Geoff Campion and Ron Tiner) begins, running until issue 1,671 (30 December 1983).
- Issue 1,656 (16 September 1983) Tales of the Gold Monkey (drawn by Geoff Campion) begins
- Issue 1,697 (29 June 1984) Final issue of TV Comic; Tales of the Gold Monkey concludes

== See also ==
- John and Gillian
- Notable British TV-based comics of the era: (Note: See also List of comics based on television programs.)
  - Doctor Who Weekly (Marvel/Panini, 1971–present) – now known as Doctor Who Magazine
  - Lady Penelope (City Magazines, 1966–1969)
  - Look-in (ITV/IPC, 1971–1994)
  - TV Action (Polystyle, 1971–1973) – previously known as Countdown
  - TV Century 21 (City Magazines, 1965–1971)
  - TV Express (Beaverbrook/City Magazines, 1954–1962) – previously known as Junior Express, Junior Express Weekly, and Express Weekly
  - TV Fun (Amalgamated Press, 1953–1960)
  - TV Tornado (City Magazines, 1967–1968)
