= Treacle mining =

Fictitious mining of black treacle

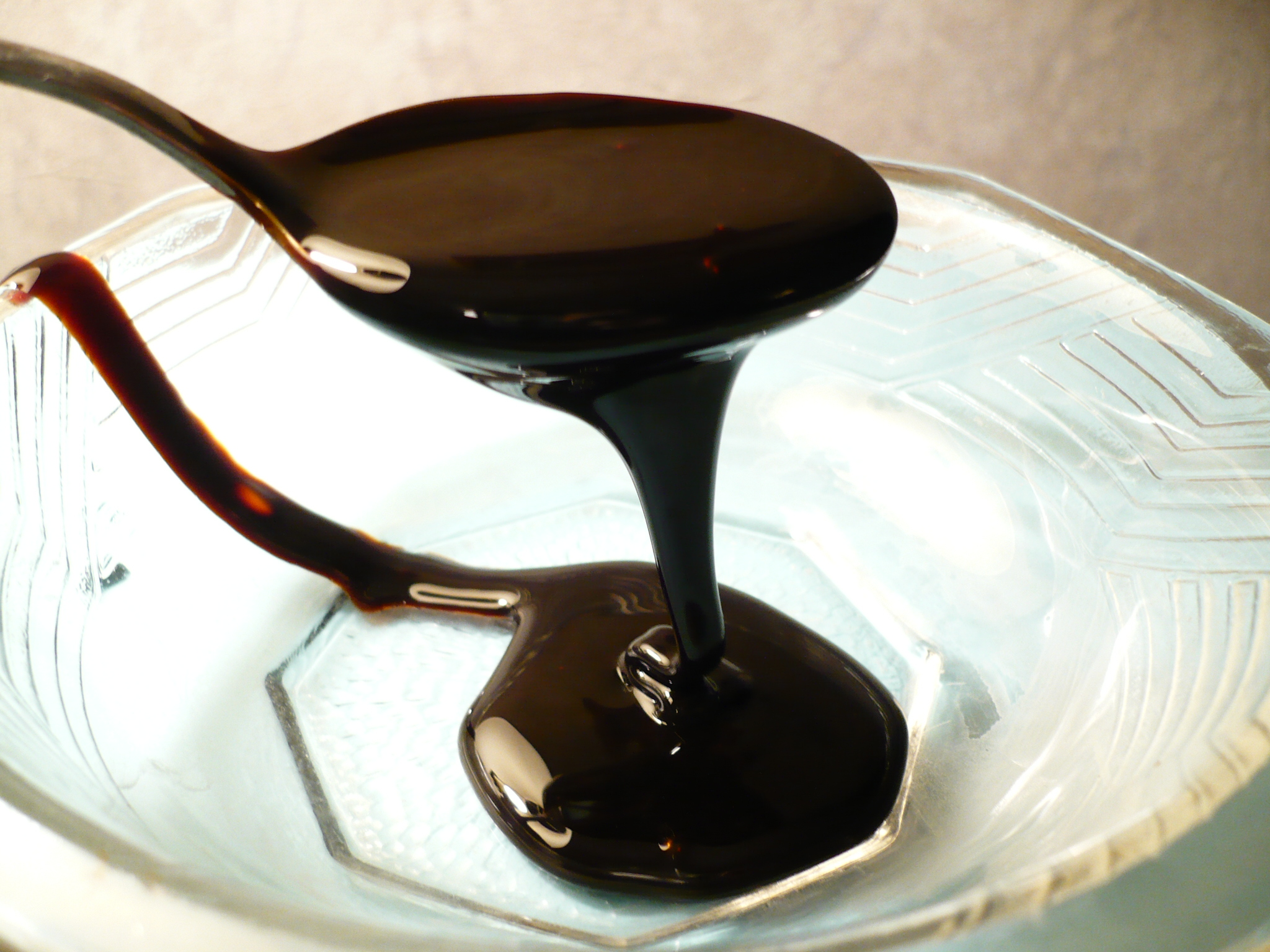
Black treacle

Treacle mining is the fictitious mining of black treacle (also known as molasses) in a raw form similar to coal. The subject purports to be serious but is an attempt to test credulity. Thick black treacle makes the deception plausible. The topic has been a joke in British humour since the mid-19th century.

== Origins ==
One possible origin of the joke is from 1853 when 8,000 British Army soldiers were camped on Chobham Common. The camp included storehouses containing barrels. When the soldiers left for the Crimean War and the site was dismantled, they buried barrels to avoid having to remove them. Some of the barrels contained treacle and Chobham villagers who discovered and removed them were called "treacle miners" as a joke. Local folklore about treacle mining was extended into history back to Roman Britain.

Another explanation is that the word treacle meant "a medicine", derived from the appearance of the Greek derivative theriacal meaning medicinal (Greek theriake "curative", "antidote"), leading to the various healing wells around Britain being called "treacle wells". Treacle later came to mean a sticky syrup after the popularity of a honey-based drug called "Venice treacle", and the continued use of the old form in the treacle wells led to the joke.

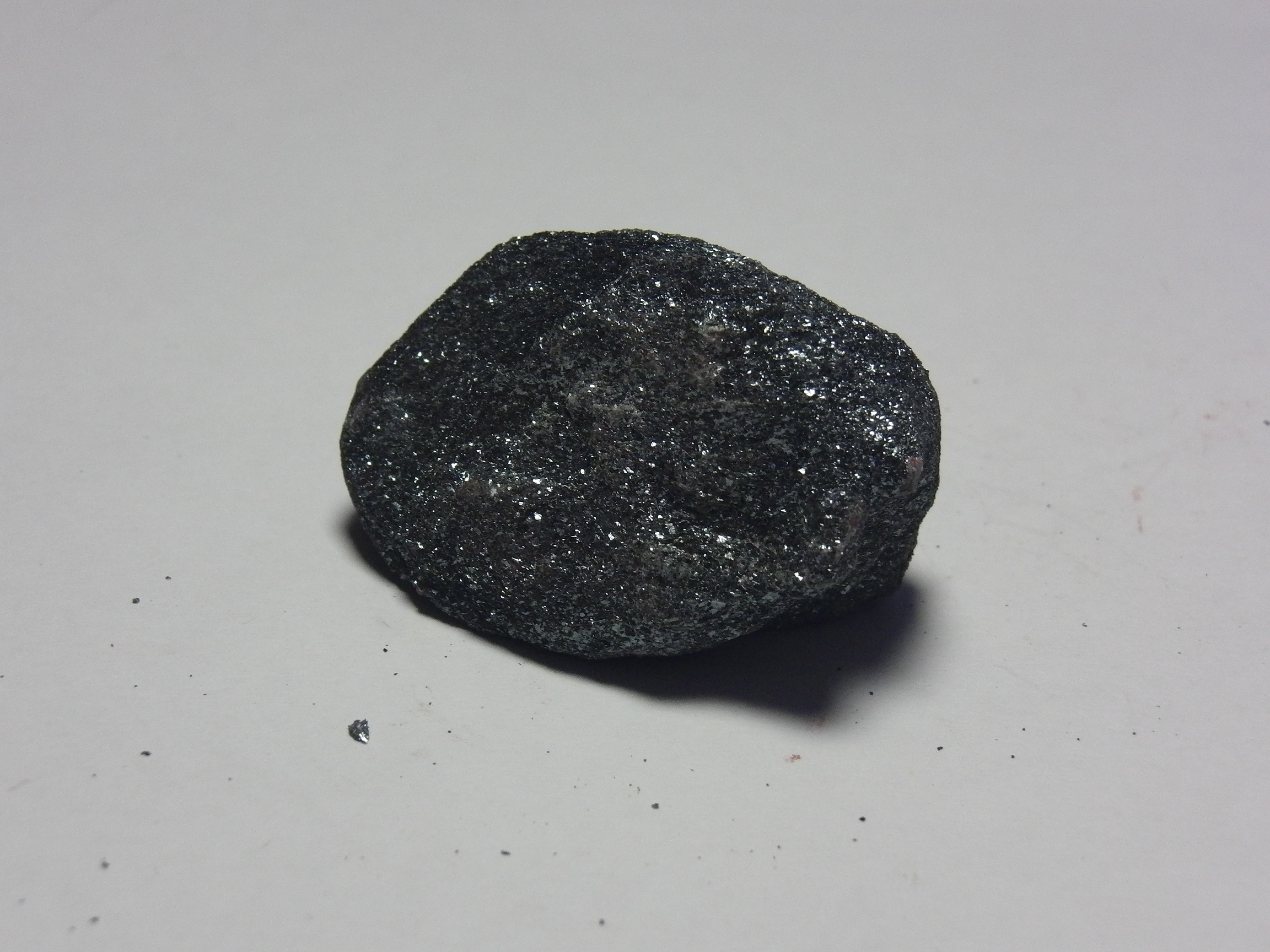
Micaceous hematite, a possible source for some treacle mine stories

In Devon, on the eastern edge of Dartmoor, the remains of mines that produced micaceous hematite, used as pounce to dust early ink to prevent smearing, are known locally as "treacle mines" since they show a glistening black residue that looks like treacle.

== Locations ==
The town of Horsham in West Sussex has well established treacle mines. The control centre is known to have been in the now closed underpass under the Bishopric, and an overflow near St Leonard's Forest is signed as such. A vent pipe is believed to be near the car park at the Tesco store at Broadbridge Heath.

The village of Sabden in Lancashire cultivated a considerable body of folklore about local treacle mining in the 1930s. The local newspaper helped foster the myth, publishing numerous stories about the fictitious mines.

The paper mills around Maidstone in Kent were known as "The Tovil Treacle Mines" by locals, after the area where one of the mills owned by Albert E. Reed was situated. The company helped the myth with a float in Maidstone carnival with a "treacle mine" theme.

One suggested source of the story in this area is a rumour that the paper industry was threatened during the Second World War because there was no imported timber. Fermentation of straw was tried, creating a sticky goo. There were attempts to make paper from other than rags in the 19th century and an early commercial success was achieved by Samuel Hook and his son, Charles Townsend Hook, using straw at Upper Tovil Mill in the 1850s. The road next to Upper Tovil Mill became known, and was later named, as Straw Mill Hill. To produce pulp, the straw was cooked in hot alkali. After separation of the fibre, the remaining liquid looked like black treacle. Upper Tovil Mill closed in the 1980s and the site was used for a housing estate.

Tudeley and Frittenden in Kent are also said to have had treacle mines. A tank wagon on the Kent and East Sussex Railway was painted in sham "Frittenden Treacle Mines" livery in 2009.

Suggestions of a treacle mine in Buxted were published by the "Friends of Horwich".

Tadley treacle mines had a local hotel named after them and a Tadley Treacle Fair is held. Legend says the name derives from using treacle tins to store money because banks could not be trusted. The tins were buried around the village. Criminals mined for tins.

Hemel Hempstead in Hertfordshire has a legend of having a treacle mine and a local nickname since around World War I was "Treacle Bumstead". Wareside, also in Hertfordshire, has long had its own "treacle mines". When asked "where have you been?", it was often a popular answer in and around Ware, to say "down the treacle mines!"

Treacle mines have also been claimed in the twin villages Trimley St. Martin and Trimley St. Mary (Suffolk), Wem (Shropshire), Talskiddy, Bisham, Nuneaton, Sway (Hampshire), Ginge (Oxfordshire), Chobham (Surrey), Tongham, Tadley, Skidby, Ditchford, Crick (Northamptonshire), Debdale (Leicestershire), Dunchideock and many other locations across Somerset and Devon, in several northern towns including Natland and Baggrow in Cumbria and Pudsey in Yorkshire, in Croftamie, Scotland, and in the fictional village of Wymsey.

== Actual places ==
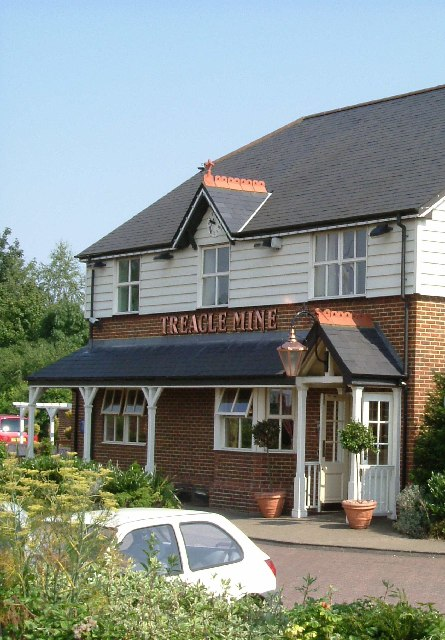
The Treacle Mine public house in Thurrock, Essex

Several public houses, restaurants and hotels have borne the name. The Treacle Mine public house in Grays, Thurrock, Essex (pictured above) is an example, and the adjacent Treacle Mine Roundabout, which features on the local bus timetable, is named after the public house.

There is a restaurant/pub named Treacle Mine in Polegate, East Sussex. The name refers to the Polegate treacle mines, a long-running tale in the area that is very popular, with locals dressing as treacle miners for the 1978 Eastbourne carnival. The origins are believed to be associated with a nearby sweet factory.

The Broomsquire Hotel in Tadley, Hampshire, was previously the Treacle Mine Hotel; and another Treacle Mine pub is in Hereford.

Since April 2009 the town of Wincanton in Somerset, twinned with Ankh-Morpork, has had a Treacle Mine Road.

== Cultural references ==
The Treacle Mine has been a joke played on children and the gullible since at least the nineteenth century.

- Ottershaw School in Surrey (a state boarding school founded in 1948 and closed in 1980) encouraged all new boys, on their first Sunday, to wait outside the Main gate for the coach that would take them on an outing to the Chobham Treacle Mines.
- In Alice's Adventures in Wonderland (1865) by Lewis Carroll, Alice is shushed at the Mad Hatter's tea party for disbelieving a story told by the Dormouse about a treacle well, inspired by the holy well at Binsey, Oxfordshire.
- In Uncle and the Treacle Trouble (1967), a children's book by J. P. Martin, the main character (an elephant named "Uncle") discovers the true meaning of a cryptic sign which reads "Treac Levat"; the characters soon discover that it relates to a vast hidden treacle vat.
- Treacle mining features in several novels by Terry Pratchett. On the fictional Discworld treacle is mined from buried deposits of compressed ancient sugarcane. In the city of Ankh-Morpork there is a street named Treacle Mine Road, with the current watch house (analogous to a police station) found in the building formerly housing the entrance to a treacle mine. The books also make references to "deep treacle" deposits beneath the city. As with many features of the Discworld, treacle mines exist because people believe in them, according to the Discworld's Theory of Narrative Causality.
- The Treacle People was a children's TV show from 1996 based around the treacle mines of Sabden in Lancashire.
- All the members of the Seven Champions Molly Dancers from Kent are reputed to be treacle miners.
- Some of Ken Dodd's Diddy Men were said to work in a jam butty mine. This appears to be a similar concept.

== See also ==
- Cow tipping
- Drop bear
- Jackalope
- Snipe hunt
- Spaghetti tree
- Wild haggis
