= Countdown (comic strip) =

Countdown issue 1

Countdown was the title strip in the British comic of the same name published by Polystyle in the early 1970s. It was an original science-fiction story - one of the few strips in the comic not to be based on a television series. Instead its visual design (but not its storyline) was based on the 1968 MGM film 2001 A Space Odyssey.

== Parent comic ==
The comic itself began life in 1971 as Countdown, a title that it retained only for its first 18 issues before beginning a lengthy series of name changes. It became TV Action by 1973. In total, 132 weekly issues were published.

== The Countdown strip ==
The eponymous Countdown strip ran in the first 70 issues, by the end of which time the comic was known as TV Action + Countdown. The artwork for the strip was by John Burns. One distinctive feature of the artwork was the extensive use of designs from the 1968 film 2001: A Space Odyssey, which were specially licensed for use in the story. The film and MGM, its producers, were credited on the strip in every edition.

Countdown, the starship, had a design based on that of the Discovery spacecraft in the film, and featured a crew of six, including an alien named Bikl (familiarly known to the crew as 'Bill'). The strip concerned the crew's efforts to overthrow the dictator Costra, who had seized control of the Earth and Moon while they were in deep space, with the assistance of technology provided by Bill and the help of an ancient lunar prospector whom they meet on the Moon.
