= Countdown (Polystyle Publications) =

British comic

- Countdown, issue 1

Publication information
- Publisher: Polystyle Publications
- Schedule: Weekly
- Format: Ongoing series
- Genre: Action; adventure; science fiction; spy-fi; techno-thriller
- Publication date: 20 February 1971 – 25 August 1973
- No. of issues: 132

Creative team
- Artists: Gerry Haylock; John M. Burns; Brian Lewis; Reprints: Mike Noble, Don Harley
- Letterers: Matt Anderson (1970–73); Danny Fox (1973)
- Editors: Dennis Hooper; Robin Hilborn (assistant editor, 1970–71); Peter Levy (assistant editor, 1971–73); Roger Perry (art editor); Bill Kidd (assistant art editor)

Countdown was a British comic published weekly by Polystyle Publications – ultimately, under several different titles – from early 1971 to late summer 1973. The pages in each issue were numbered in reverse order, with page 1 at the end – a gimmick which was derived from the comic's title to create a countdown to the number one every week.

Countdown initially featured many comic strips based on Gerry Anderson's Supermarionation TV shows which had been popular throughout the 1960s. (Much of this material was reprinted from an earlier publication called TV Century 21.) The principle exceptions to this were the strips based on Doctor Who, which had previously been published in Polystyle's long-established title TV Comic, the Anderson's new live-action series UFO, and (from issue 35) the Roger Moore/Tony Curtis vehicle The Persuaders!

It was a high-quality (but expensive) publication, featuring full-colour art on the cover and on many of the inside pages, and was printed on coated paper. After 58 weeks, the publisher cut costs by relaunching the comic under the title TV Action, in a much cheaper format. The relaunch saw a gradual shift in emphasis away from Gerry Anderson content, with an increased focus on comic strip stories based on popular crime and adventure TV series of the era such as Hawaii Five-O, The Protectors and Alias Smith and Jones.

A notable feature of Countdown was the inclusion of non-fiction articles about current space exploration which often included a level of technical detail more typical of technical trade journals aimed at adult professionals.

== Publication history ==
=== Background and development ===
From 1965 to 1969, the weekly British children's comic TV Century 21 (later known as TV21), published comic book versions of the many Supermarionation TV shows created by the Century 21 Productions company of Gerry and Sylvia Anderson. By mid-1969, however, TV21 was no longer paying for the licence or printing any Anderson content. (TV Century 21 had originally been published by City Magazines, in partnership with Anderson's Century 21 Publishing; its final year of publication was with IPC Magazines.)

In conceiving of the new comic, and with Anderson's UFO set to debut on television in autumn of 1970, an opportunity arose to create a new, Anderson-based publication. In addition, Countdown editor Dennis Hooper and art editor Roger Perry had for several years enjoyed a close professional association with Gerry Anderson and his wife Sylvia, and therefore had intimate knowledge of the Supermarionation shows. Hooper and Perry had been employees of Century 21 Publishing between 1964 and 1968, with Hooper art editor of TV21's various spin-off magazines, including Lady Penelope and Candy, while Perry oversaw the books and the Christmas annuals. During this period, it had been natural for them to make regular visits to the parent company, Century 21 Productions (whose film studios were to the west of Greater London, near Windsor).

At the beginning of 1969, Century 21 Productions disbanded their three warehouse-sized film studios on the Slough Trading Estate, when Lew Grade took the decision to cease production of the Supermarionation shows and transfer to live action filming at ATV Elstree for the latest show, Anderson's UFO; in consequence, as of June 1969 the entire staff of Century 21 Publishing were given a month's notice. TV21, Lady Penelope and Candy struggled on for a few more months. They – together with a small nucleus of staff from the disbanded Century 21 Publishing – were taken on by Leonard Matthews (ex-managing editor of Fleetway Juvenile Comics) and Alf Wallace (ex-managing editor of Eagle and Odhams' Power Comics line), who were now operating an independent studio off Fleet Street under the name of Martspress. By 1970, TV21 was heavily reliant on American Marvel Comics reprints and no longer featured any Gerry Anderson content.

All this being so, it was a simple matter for Polystyle to get Lew Grade's blessing and secure the appropriate franchising licences on the discontinued puppet shows which TV-21 had recently discarded. In addition, the new magazine had easy access to a wealth of ready-made artwork from those shows, created by the best continuity strip artists of the day – artwork which had been used only once before in TV21, and was now filed away in the vaults beneath Farringdon Road, London. Although the stories had already been seen in print four or five years earlier, those readers had grown up and were assumed to be no longer reading comics. To the intended new readership of Countdown, these reprint strips would appear entirely new.

==== Printing deal ====
Another piece of good fortune for Polystyle arose from another company's misfortune. In April 1950, the boys' comic Eagle first saw the light of day on Sun Printers Ltd machines at Watford. Sun Printers had temporarily handled the job of printing Eagle in the twelve months it took printer Eric Bemrose (of Liverpool) to design and build new ten-unit rotogravure machines. By 1971, however, Sun Printers had been unable to find enough work to keep their own photogravure presses running. With Sun being already familiar with this type of comics work, a deal was struck between Sun and Polystyle to print Countdown for one calendar year (52 issues) for the cost of the materials only – all machine-time was free of charge.

==== Staff ====
The magazine had a very small in-house staff of just four. Apart from editor Dennis Hooper and art editor Roger Perry, the Countdown staff included Robin Hilborn (assistant editor, 1970–71), Peter Levy (assistant editor, 1971–73) and 54-year-old Bill Kidd (assistant art editor), who in early 1973 died of stomach cancer. He was replaced by 19-year-old Danny Fox, a letterer who had been working on Countdown's sister magazine TV Comic.

=== Launch ===
Polystyle were uncertain as to the most effective name for the new comic (an uncertainty which was to lead to five name changes over its run), initially registering the publication – and listing it in the official indicia – as Countdown and Rocket. (Rocket, initially self-described as "The First Space-Age Weekly" and later as "The Space Adventure Weekly", had survived for only 32 issues back in 1956.) The first issue of Countdown was launched on 20 February 1971.

The expense of the high-quality paper and photogravure quality printing needed for the colour pages and photo features, however, meant a high cover price of 5p (one shilling) compared to 6d and 7d for competing IPC Magazines titles such as Valiant, Lion, and Smash!, making Countdown almost twice as expensive as any other boys' comic on the market (a fact which was addressed by the editorial in issue #1).

With issue No. 19 and going until issue No. 45, the title of the comic was amended to Countdown: The Space-Age Comic! Issues #45–56 saw the new title Countdown for TV Action!, and issues #57–58 saw the title changed to TV Action in Countdown.

=== Relaunch ===
TV Action No. 59, 1 April 1972

After 58 weeks, the publisher cut costs by relaunching the comic in a much cheaper format. From issue No. 59 (1 April 1972), Countdown dropped the glossy printing that had distinguished it, and switched to cheap newsprint-quality paper, also abandoning the photogravure printing that had also been a feature until then. (This entailed also switching to new printers: David Brockdorff Ltd of Walthamstow and Harlow.)

The relaunch saw a shift in emphasis away from Gerry Anderson content, with the Doctor Who strip given the front page as well as two pages inside. The newly named TV Action + Countdown dropped many of the original strips from Countdown, substituting new ones based on contemporary crime and adventure television programmes: these included Hawaii Five-O, Alias Smith and Jones and Cannon (TV Series). From issue No. 100, the publication's title became simply TV Action, and the roster of strips expanded to include the Gerry Anderson-produced The Protectors.

The final issue, No. 132, was cover-dated 25 August 1973; the following week, the title officially merged with Polystyle's TV Comic, with only Doctor Who and the humorous Droopy and Dad's Army strips initially surviving the merger—ironic given that these three strips had originally featured in TV Comic before being transferred across to Countdown/TV Action. New strips based on the TV detective series Cannon would later appear in TV Comic, while several of those which had first been published in TV Action would later be reprinted in short-lived TV Comic sister-title Target in 1978.

=== Title changes ===
The title was changed or amended five times in the course of the comic's run:

- Issues 1–18: Countdown
- Issues 19–45: Countdown: The Space-Age Comic!
- Issues 46–56: Countdown for TV Action!
- Issues 57–58: TV Action in Countdown
- Issues 59–100: TV Action + Countdown
- Issues 101–132: TV Action

=== Annuals ===
In addition to the weekly comics, there were three annuals published (longer form, 80-page hardbacks)

- Countdown Annual 1972 (published Autumn 1971)
- Countdown for TV Action Annual 1973 (published Autumn 1972)
- TV Action Annual 1974 (published Autumn 1973)

== Content ==
=== Countdown era ===
Countdown was unusual in carrying both weekly serials and complete stories, rotating the latter among the various TV programmes that it featured. Countdown featured an original strip based on the latest Anderson production, the live-action series UFO, along with reprints of strips from earlier Anderson successes like Stingray, Thunderbirds and Fireball XL5. In addition, it carried a totally original strip, Countdown, drawn by John M. Burns and including spacecraft designs from the 1968 film 2001: A Space Odyssey.

Countdown was distinctive for its highly detailed non-fiction articles – five or six pages in a 24-page issue — with an emphasis on space exploration. The space articles were written by Robin Hilborn until issue No. 32 and Peter Levy (often writing as "Arnold Kingston" and "Peter Brosnan") thereafter, with contributions from freelancers Dan Lloyd and Peter Newark. These articles included a level of technical detail more typical of technical trade journals: for example, in a 1971 issue of Countdown, the fourth instalment of a series on unmanned satellites, entitled "Space Lighthouses," explained the Doppler effect and gave details of US and Soviet navigation satellite programmes.

=== TV Action era ===
To capitalise on the continuing popularity of the Doctor Who strip, featuring the likeness of Jon Pertwee (the actor who was then playing the Doctor on TV), that strip became the regular cover feature of TV Action. As an added inducement, the publisher had obtained a licence to include popular villains the Daleks in the strip. Hence the first relaunch issue had a colour cover featuring the Third Doctor and the Daleks. Doctor Who had an unshakeable popularity; it had emerged from, and would ultimately return to, the pages of TV Action's sister publication, TV Comic.

A comics version of the action-comedy series The Persuaders! debuted in issue No. 35 of Countdown, and this continued into the TV Action era, alongside Hawaii Five-0, Tightrope, Cannon, and other contemporary TV series.

==== The Man From TV Action ====
Art editor Roger Perry was often present at filmings of Doctor Who, and finding a suitable picture from the files to go with a feature written about the recording was easy, and also gave the magazine a feeling of greater flexibility. Additional "filler pages" typically took the form of a competition (giving away items such as Airfix construction kits), or something quick and easy to write such as a hastily penned "profile" by Peter Levy.

One of these last-minute filler pages had come about after Perry needed to attend a funeral in Stuttgart. Several months earlier, on a particularly blustery day in late March 1972, Perry had driven down to Pegwell Bay in East Kent, taking with him science writer Dan Lloyd, who from 1959 through to 1968 had been Eagle magazine's chief sub-editor. It had been Lloyd's plan to create an in-depth feature on hovercraft but at Pegwell Bay, gale-force winds had prevented the hovercraft from flying. "Hoverlloyd" had been very cautious, as earlier that same month – on 4 March 1972 – an SR.N6 travelling from Ryde, Isle of Wight, to Portsmouth had overturned in similar winds on the Solent, killing five of the 27 passengers. The freak accident had happened just 400 yards off Southsea beach. To compensate for their disappointment, Lloyd's press officer suggested that when they next were in the vicinity, Lloyd and Perry would be most welcome to be given a free ride over to France.

Perry telephoned Lloyd's press officer and was immediately invited to the launching of the company's third SR.N4 craft. The launching would be blessed by the inventor of the hovercraft, Sir Christopher Cockerell, CBE. Taking assistant art editor Bill Kidd along as staff photographer, Perry found he had enough material to create the first in a long line of The Man From TV Action features.

This was not the first time that Perry had been involved in this type of informative journalism. In 1961, while employed as a designer on Eagle, Perry's image had been used in a weekly continuity strip called The Roving Reporter. Although Perry never actually left the confines of his office, the illustrations created, by (amongst others) Countdown artists John M. Burns and Eric Kincaid (better known for his Toad of Toad Hall and Riverbank Tales), gave the impression that Perry (a.k.a. Larry Line) was always out and about somewhere in the ever-expanding world.

== Production and distribution problems ==
Countdown was unique in that some of its content changed from week to week. This was not by intent, but purely from necessity. Hooper worked long hours writing scripts for many of the strips. Nonetheless, the problem was that Perry was not being given the scripts early enough for the artists to create and deliver the completed artwork on time.

Ideally, there would be a five-week lead time between "press day" (the date on which all text and artwork was handed over to the printer) and the cover date (the day on which the magazine went on sale to the public). This five-week period allowed time for the typesetters to set the text copy, and for the planners to produce a visual "dummy" (an exact-size page-for-page mock-up of what the magazine will look like, having followed the designer's layouts). This "dummy" is put together from cut-and-pasted pieces of paper that show all the pictures scaled to their correct size (using what used to be called "photostats") and with text and headings in their correct positions. The dummy is sent to the publisher for the editing staff to re-read the copy, to make sure there are no mistakes, and to make any changes necessary. As there were no computers in the publishing industry in those days, it was part of a designer's job to make sure the text fit the space allotted for it. Invariably it was either just too long or just too short to fit snugly, so extra writing or the cutting of some text had to be done. Once the "dummy" went back to the printer's, no more changes could be made.

Two weeks after returning the dummy to the printer (still several days before copies went on sale, thus allowing time for distribution of copies throughout the country), advance copies were made available to the staff. Although there was a small amount of leeway, such that if the printer had been warned some artwork could be up to a week or ten days late, Perry very often did not receive Hooper's script until press day itself ... and it still had to be illustrated by the artist and balloon-lettered before sending it off to the printer.

A second problem was that the artists being employed to create the continuity strips did not solely work on Countdown but often took on other work to fill their week's workload. One such artist used to deliver his work a day later with each succeeding week. The answer to this was to let the story run its course of four, five or six weeks, and then drop in something else for a couple of weeks, thus giving him the chance to catch up. Leaving Hooper to carry on writing his scripts, this decision had been made by Perry; and it was being said (as first uttered by Dennis Bosdet, a representative from Linden Artists) that Countdown was no longer being edited by Hooper but by Perry.

Distribution was also a problem. Although matters improved after the first 26 weeks, initially the distribution of the new comic was patchy, with some issues failing to go on sale at all in some regions, as they could not be printed in sufficient quantities in time to reach the newsagents by the cover date, perhaps as a consequence of the production problems.

== Analysis ==
Whether all the relaunch changes were effective is open to question, as the new TV Action lasted just 74 issues, a run only slightly longer than that of the original Countdown, which had lasted 58 issues. Undoubtedly the reduction in production costs by dropping the expensive lithographic printing and magazine-quality paper played some part in TV Action lasting for as long as it did.

Like TV21, which had also tried to ride the coattails of the popularity of television, Countdown and TV Action had shown that the approach was not sustainable – at least not in the teenage market. Polystyle did achieve a long-running success with the concept in a slightly younger market, with its mostly-humour title TV Comic, aimed at five-to-ten-year-olds, which ran for more than 30 years.

In later years, one of Countdown's strips would demonstrate that a weekly TV-based comic could succeed in an older market, when Marvel UK launched Doctor Who Weekly in 1979 – this paper featured a single TV show and included factual coverage of the Doctor Who programme and its production, alongside comic strips based on it.

== Strips ==
=== Countdown strips (issues #1–58) ===
The strips, many of which were reprinted from TV21, included:

- Captain Scarlet and the Mysterons
- Countdown – the eponymous "Countdown" strip
- Dastardly and Muttley
- Doctor Who
- Fireball XL5
- Joe 90
- Lady Penelope
- The Persuaders! — debuted in issue No. 35
- The Secret Service
- Stingray
- Thunderbirds
- UFO
- Zero-X

=== TV Action strips (issues #59–132) ===
- Alias Smith and Jones
- Autocat and Motormouse
- Cannon
- Dad's Army
- Doctor Who
- Droopy
- Hawaii Five-O
- Mission Impossible
- The Protectors
- Tightrope

== See also ==
- List of comics based on television programs

== Sources ==
- Countdown at the Grand Comics Database
- TV Action at the Grand Comics Database
