= Express Weekly =

Comic magazine

Publication information
- Publisher: Beaverbrook (1954–1960); City Magazines (1960–1962)
- Schedule: Weekly
- Format: Ongoing series
- Genre: Adventure, Children's, Science fiction
- Publication date: 4 Sept. 1954 – 13 Jan. 1962
- No. of issues: 375

Creative team
- Written by: Mike Butterworth, Dave Wood
- Artist(s): Bruce Cornwall, Ron Embleton, Jack Kirby, Mike Noble, Terence Patrick, Ferdinando Tacconi, Mike Western

Express Weekly was a British children's comic magazine, published between 1954 and 1962 under a progression of titles: Junior Express, Junior Express Weekly, Express Weekly, and TV Express Weekly.

The publication was similar in format to the popular children's comic Eagle: tabloid with photogravure colour, with a mixture of comic strips and features.

== Publication history ==
Published by Beaverbrook Newspapers, whose flagship title was the Daily Express, the publication started out in 1954 as Junior Express. It was renamed Junior Express Weekly in 1955 and then Express Weekly in 1956. In 1960, the title was acquired by City Magazines and renamed TV Express Weekly.

It was acquired by Polystyle Publications in 1962 (after issue #375) and merged into TV Comic.

- Junior Express (38 issues, 4 Sept. 1954–June 1955)
- Junior Express Weekly (35 issues, June 1955–11 Feb. 1956)
- Express Weekly (212 issues, 18 Feb. 1956–Apr. 1960)
- TV Express Weekly (91 issues, 23 Apr. 1960–13 Jan. 1962)

== Comic strips (selected) ==
- Biggles, by Mike Western and then Ron Embleton (1960–1962)
- Journey into Space, drawn first by Ferdinando Tacconi, and then Bruce Cornwall and Terence Patrick (from 1956)
- No Hiding Place, by Mike Western (1960–1962)
- Lone Ranger and Tonto, by Mike Noble (1958–1962)
- Sky Masters of the Space Force, drawn by Jack Kirby (issues #208-259)
- Wulf the Briton (originally Freedom Is The Prize), written by Mike Butterworth and drawn by Ron Embleton (1955–1960)
