= Uncle (novel) =

1964 novel by J. P. Martin

- First edition cover.
- Author: J. P. Martin
- Illustrator: Quentin Blake
- Language: English
- Series: The Uncle series
- Publisher: Jonathan Cape
- Publication date: 1964
- Publication place: UK
- Media type: Print
- Pages: 160
- Followed by: Uncle Cleans Up

Uncle (1964) is a children's novel written by J. P. Martin, the first book of six forming the Uncle series. It is named after the main character, a rich philanthropic elephant who lives in a huge fantastical castle populated by many other eccentric animals and people. It was illustrated, like the others in the series, by Quentin Blake.

== Plot summary ==
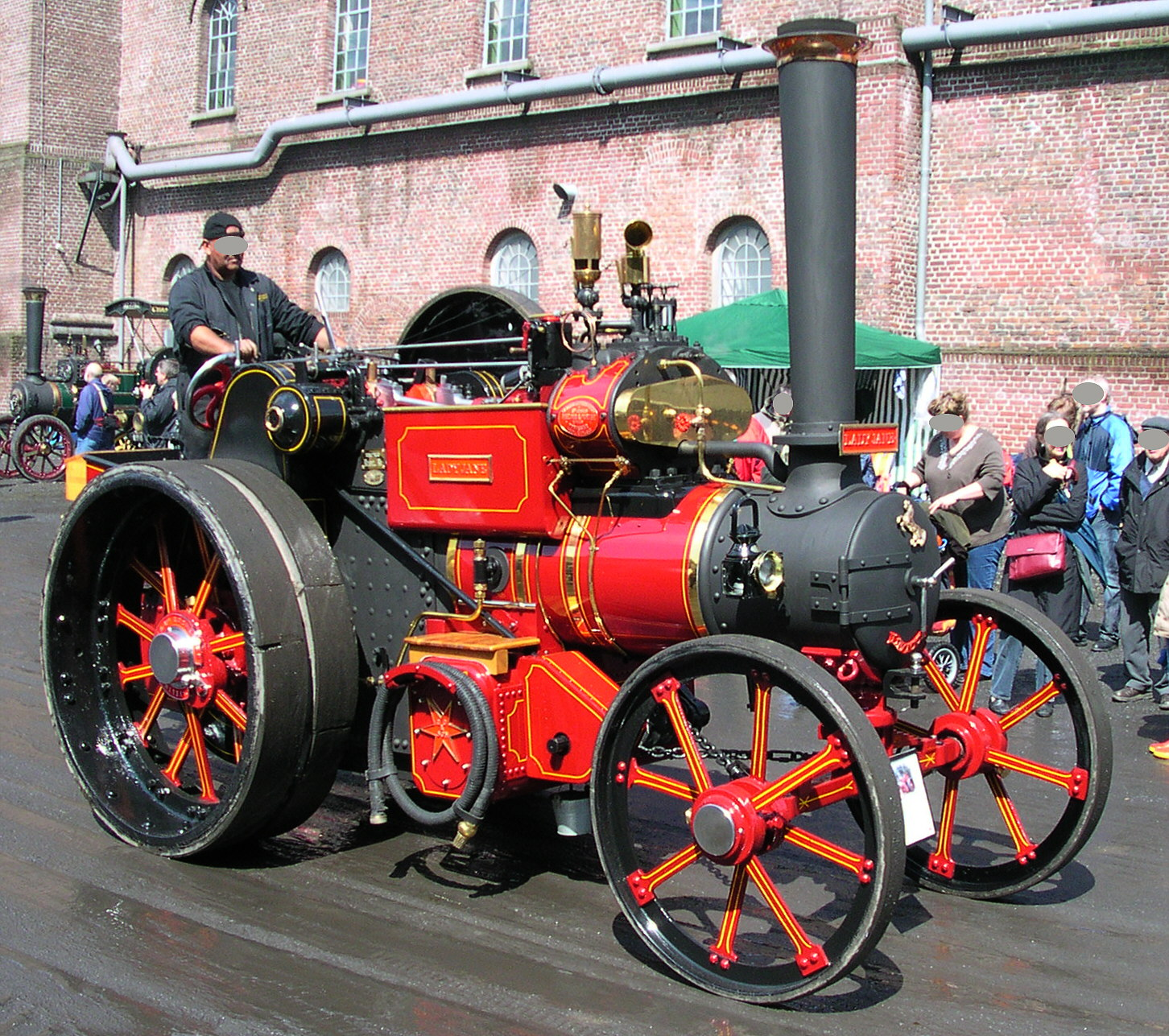
A traction engine, Uncle's favourite mode of transport, as most suited to the dignity of an elephant

The book introduces the main characters in the series; Uncle, his helpers, including the Old Monkey, Cloutman, Gubbins and the One-Armed Badger, and his enemies, the Badfort crowd, including Beaver Hateman, Sigismund Hateman, Nailrod Hateman, Filljug Hateman, Jellytussle, Hootman and Hitmouse. After a series of incidents, the Badfort crowd construct a cinema with a hidden iron cage in which they trap Uncle, who is then rescued by a surprise attack by his allies.

== Reprint ==
The book was reprinted in paperback in 2000 by Red Fox (ISBN 0099411415). It was reprinted in a facsimile hardback edition by the New York Review of Books in 2007 and again in 2009 (ISBN 1590172396).
