= The Treacle People =

Animated children's television programme

The Treacle People is a stop motion animated children's television programme shown on CITV in the United Kingdom from 3 May 1996 to 25 July 1997 and re-ran on Channel 4 from 23 July 2005 to 16 February 2014. It had 2 series, each with 13 episodes, as well as a Christmas special. It was produced by The London Studios for London Weekend Television (Granada Television produced the second series) and Fire Mountain Productions in association with Link Entertainment.

In 2023, the series was remastered, with full episodes uploaded on the official Treacle People YouTube Channel, and in 2025, a sequel audio drama was released on Audible, entitled "Still Sticky".

== Development ==
The concept for the show was created by Bill Dewhurst, a resident of Sabden, Lancashire, who created dolls on which the Treacle People characters were based during a period of unemployment in the 1980's. Dewhurst, together with his wife, son, and two daughters, sold the dolls at craft fairs, before the Dewhurst family developed the show together with a production company. The show, which used stop-motion animation, ran for 27 episodes from 1996 to 1997.

== Plot ==
The show was written by Brian and Jonathan Trueman (the former of whom was the writer of Danger Mouse) and was based in a fictionalized version of the Northern English village of Sabden, in Pendle, where treacle is (allegedly) a natural resource extracted through mines. However, the mines have run dry from overextraction, and the village may face destruction from a lack of economy. The main characters Bill Wizzle and Rosie use a Treacle finder, similar to a water dowser, to discover a vein of treacle in the abandoned mines which is home to treacle-loving creatures called Boggarts. The two series focus on reopening the mines, and problems faced (such as exportation).

== Characters ==
- Bill Wizzle – The boy who uses a Treacle finder to find for Sabden another vein of treacle. He is voiced by Jim McManus.
- Rosie – Bill Wizzle's best friend. She is voiced by Caroline Bernstein.
- Bert – A white Boggart whom Wizzle and Rosie befriend. He is voiced by Caroline Bernstein.
- The Professor – He seeks to research in treacle and find ingenious ways to export it, though not always succeeding. He is voiced by Alec Bregonzi.
- Tapper – A miner who is also a mechanic, he also has a steam traction engine called Bessie. He is voiced by Glynn Mills.
- Ike – Rosie's dad who runs as a blacksmith who also works with Tapper in building things. He is voiced by Glynn Mills.
- Leyland Lil – The landlady who runs the Bubble & Boggart inn that serves ginger beer and makes parkin as hard as a rock. She is voiced by Caroline Bernstein.
- Charlie – Lil's small assistant who doesn't talk much and is constantly abused by Lil when giving him orders. He was voiced by Brian Trueman
- Nellie Newchurch – Lil's posh rival from Perfect Parkin Parlour shop across the street. She is voiced by Alec Bregonzi.
- Brendan Robinson – Originated from Dún Laoghaire, Ireland, Brendan is the owner of a ginger beer brewery and bottling plant. He is voiced by Jim Norton.
- Silas Mitton – Rosie's uncle, a wealthy investor who tries to come up with many way to put the village on the map. He is voiced by Jim Norton.
- P.C. Pendle – A local policeman who is oftentimes clueless in his job. He is voiced by Jim McManus.
- Digger – or Alaster Auchentoshen McMurdo of the Clan McMurdo of Ayr and Troon as his real name, is Brendan's Scottish cousin who appears in Series 2. He came for work in Sabden and dig for Porridge, which is something Boggarts like for curing their flu. He is voiced by Jim Norton.
- Barrow & Furness – Two crooks who appeared in Sabden in Series 2. They are voiced by Alec Bregonzi and Brian Trueman
- Santa – Only appearing in the Christmas Special, he'd gained help from Bert in finding Sabden to deliver the townsfolk their presents. He was voiced by Willie Rushton.
- The Queen – Royalty who resembles Leyland Lil, who appears briefly at the end of the Christmas Special when making her speech, and in the very last episode of the series to unveil Sabden's statue. She is voiced by Caroline Bernstein.
- Stirling – Digger's pet Haggis who resembles a bagpipe. He is voiced by Iain Russell
- Boggarts – Creatures who thrive in treacle mines, unlike Bert who is white, the other Boggarts are normally brown. They are voiced by Caroline Bernstein.
- Moobark – A cross between a Friesian cow and an Airedale Terrier.
- Narrator – A witty offscreen voice (Glynn Mills) who narrates what happened in the last episode and asking how the people of Sabden going to fix this episode's mess. It was revealed at the end of the very last episode of the series that the narrator is actually The Professor's Sound Sponge from four episodes back in "Sounds Crazy".

== Episodes ==
=== Season 1 ===
No. overall	No. in season	Title	Original release date
1	1	"Treacle Trouble"	3 May 1996
Times are hard for The Treacle People. The once-great treacle mines are running dry and the treacle industry is in crisis. Only Bill Wizzle and his treacle-tracker are their only hope on finding new supplies.
2	2	"The Great Escape"	10 May 1996
Having found treacle in the mines, the sticky heroes also discover that they can't get out. But thanks to the Professor, two old mine carts and a sack of bubbles, all is not lost...'
3	3	"Trouble at t'Mill"	17 May 1996
Silas gives Rosie and Wizzle a job helping in the treacle mill but with Bert the Boggart causing all sorts of chaos, Silas discovers they are better off unemployed than employed.
4	4	"Up, Up and Away!"	24 May 1996
The Professor builds a balloon to export the treacle, but PC Pendle and Bert accidentally take it for an unauthorized test drive...
5	5	"Double Digging"	31 May 1996
Having failed to export the treacle from the valley via the balloon, Tapper and Ike decide to dig a tunnel.
6	6	"It Must be Fête"	7 June 1996
The villages hold an ill-fated fête, with over-competitive competitors, misjudged judging and a band that should be banned.
7	7	"Stormy Weather"	14 June 1996
When rain stops play, Wizzle goes to rescue Moobark and ends up trapped in a ginger beer flood.\
8	8	"Revolting Boggarts"	21 June 1996
There's trouble when the Boggarts revolt and run riot in Bessie. Luckily, Silas is there to negotiate, even more luckily, Rosie is there to stop him.
9	9	"What's the Drill?"	28 June 1996
The Professor's latest invention the "Frothmatic Turbo Drill" causes chaos by tunneling through treacle and wrecking rocks.
10	10	"Sticky Like us"	5 July 1996
The Professor's new Treacle Vapour system goes horribly wrong, and the villagers find themselves somewhat stuck. Will they ever get free?
11	11	"Where's Charlie?"	12 July 1996
Charlie leaves the "Bubble and Boggart" after constant harassment off Lil, and goes to seek his fortune, but only finds misfortune when he ends up at Nellie Newchurch's Perfect Parkin Parlour.
12	12	"Slippery Slopes"	19 July 1996
Silas tries to make a fortune out of waffles and when that ends in disaster, Tapper accidentally makes an artificial Ski Slope with the remaining waffles, much to Rosie's delight.
13	13	"Show up for Showdown"	26 July 1996
Will the sticky heroes survive the village show? And what on Earth are they going to do with 300 tonnes of candyfloss?
14	14	"Sticky Christmas"	13 December 1996
It's Christmas time in Sabden and the Professor has invented a weather making machine to create snow. But when the machine smothers the sky full of thick fog and snow clouds, Rosie worries that Santa will not find the village and not deliver everybody's presents.

=== Season 2 ===
No. overall	No. in season	Title	Original release date
15	1	"One Flu Over the Boggart's Nest"	2 May 1997
When all the Boggarts in Sabden are sick, Brendan's Scottish cousin, "Digger" comes over and brings his special recipe cure, porridge.
16	2	"Digger Digs In"	9 May 1997
Now, Digger has taken up residence in Sabden, he must find a job. Silas is reluctant to employ him at first but Digger mentions he is not interested in any wages and just wants a roof over his head and plenty of unpaid work, much to Silas' delight. Unfortunately, Pendle causes a stir the next morning when he accidentally causes the Bubble and Boggart to blow up whilst hitting a pressure cooker full of porridge.
17	3	"Stuck Up Job"	16 May 1997
Rosie, Wizzle and Tapper help to fix the "Bubble and Boggart" whilst Lil takes refuge from Nellie Newchurch, but it isn't long until they're at each other's throats once again.
18	4	"Loose Change"	23 May 1997
The Professor's changing formula liquid accidentally gets mixed in with a batch of Silas' black pudding ginger beer and soon nearly everybody except Rosie, Bert, The Prof and Brendan has changed their natural personalities. Can the Prof find a way to get them back to normal?
19	5	"Scares and Stripes"	30 May 1997
PC Nicko Pendle needs to have made 100 arrests by the end of the day to be promoted to sergeant. He soon finds excuses to arrest everybody in Sabden, and when there is no one else left, he even arrests himself! Unfortunately, there are some real criminals on the loose and they take advantage of having the empty village to themselves.
20	6	"Smug Smugglers"	6 June 1997
Barrow and Furness, the robbers on the loose, wire into Silas' telephone connection and trick Lil into thinking Furness is Silas and asks for a barrow full of treacle butties to be left by the mine. When the real Silas finds out, he realizes something is afoot and the villagers get their own back on the two villains.
21	7	"The Quest for the Golden Nugget!"	13 June 1997
Wizzle's treacle tracker finds a treasure chest buried in the moors. Inside the chest is a map claiming there is a golden nugget somewhere in the mine. Silas and the other villagers are soon on the trail, but so is Barrow and Furness...
22	8	"A Grim Day Out"	20 June 1997
When all the villagers except Digger, go away for the day on Bessie. Barrow and Furness take advantage of having the village all to themselves. But when they get back, the thieves find themselves in a rather sticky situation and so does PC Nicko Pendle...
23	9	"Sounds Crazy"	27 June 1997
Rosie and Wizzle use the Professor's new sound sponge to record all the sounds of Sabden.
24	10	"Rollercop"	4 July 1997
When Nicko Pendle requests a form of transport from his stingy superior, Chief Inspector Foulridge. The double-dealing detective gives Nicko a rather humiliating gift, a pair of roller-blades!
25	11	"Euroboggart"	11 July 1997
Silas wants Tapper and Digger to dig a tunnel to France to export their treacle and so that French tourists can visit Sabden.
26	12	"It's a Funny Old Game!"	18 July 1997
The villagers play against the boggarts in a football match. But those cheeky boggarts decide to play unfairly...
27	13	"Sticky Like One!"	25 July 1997
Silas asks Wizzle to build a statue of the person who has brought the most fame and fortune to Sabden. However, Silas is none too pleased when he sees who the statue Wizzle built is actually of!

== Audio Sequel ==
In May 2024, an audio drama follow-up was announced, under the title "The Treacle People - Still Sticky". Acting as the show's official third series, the set was written by Jonathan Trueman, and stars Caroline Bernstein, Glynn Mills and Jim Norton, reprising their roles from the original series. The six episodes were released on Audible in April 2025.

== Rights ==
The rights to The Treacle People are now owned by independent production company, Fire Mountain Productions Limited. Fire Mountain Productions was set up by the show's producer, Iain Russell.

== Awards ==
The Treacle People, followed up by a Christmas special, was BAFTA nominated in the children's animation category in 1997.

== Credits ==
- Written by: Brian and Jonathan Trueman
- Developed for television by: Mike Furness and Iain Russell
- From an original idea by: The Dewhurst Family
- Featuring the voices of: Caroline Bernstein, Alec Bregonzi, Jim McManus, Glynn Mills, Jim Norton, Willie Rushton and Brian Trueman
- Title song: Sticky
- Music by: Simon Webb
- Casting director: Nikki Finch
- Director of animation: Martin Pullen
- Animators: Mike Cottee, Timon Dowdeswell, Andy Joule and Daryl Marsh
- Production manager: Mike Fisher
- Musical co-ordinator: Rachel Williams
- Music recording: Gerry Kitchingham
- Musicians: Simon Clark, Nick Hitchins, Ben Kennard, Roddy Lorimer, Bob Loveday, Glynn Matthews, Wes McGee, Tamsin Rowlinson and Simon Webb
- Additional animation: Tobias Fouracre and Mark Waring
- Lighting cameramen: Adrian Chadlecott, John Duffy, Peter Ellmore, Colin Innes-Hopkins and Tom Kinane
- Puppets built and designed by: Richard Blakey and Maggie Haden
- Original art director: Alan Murphy
- Sets built and designed by: Jessica Ace, Colin Armitage, Toby Burrell, Barbara Cowdery and Keith Grant
- Assisted by: James Heath and Melissa Johnson
- Graphic designer: Bill Wilson
- Editors: Martin Hay, Paul Hudson, Alex Maddison, Andy Marangone, Alan Ritchie and Jeremy Scott
- Sound supervisors: Rob Ashard, Graham Hix, Jon Matthews and Russell Smithson
- Production assistant: Jo Newey
- Production associates: Kathy Schulz and Sue Bennett-Urwin
- Executive producers: Penny Lent and Danielle Lux
- Director: Mike Furness
- Producer: Iain Russell

== See also ==
- Treacle mining
