= Buzby =

British Telecom mascot

A badge featuring Buzby and his catchphrase

Buzby was a yellow (later orange) talking cartoon bird, launched in 1976 as part of a marketing campaign by Post Office Telecommunications, which later became British Telecommunications (BT).

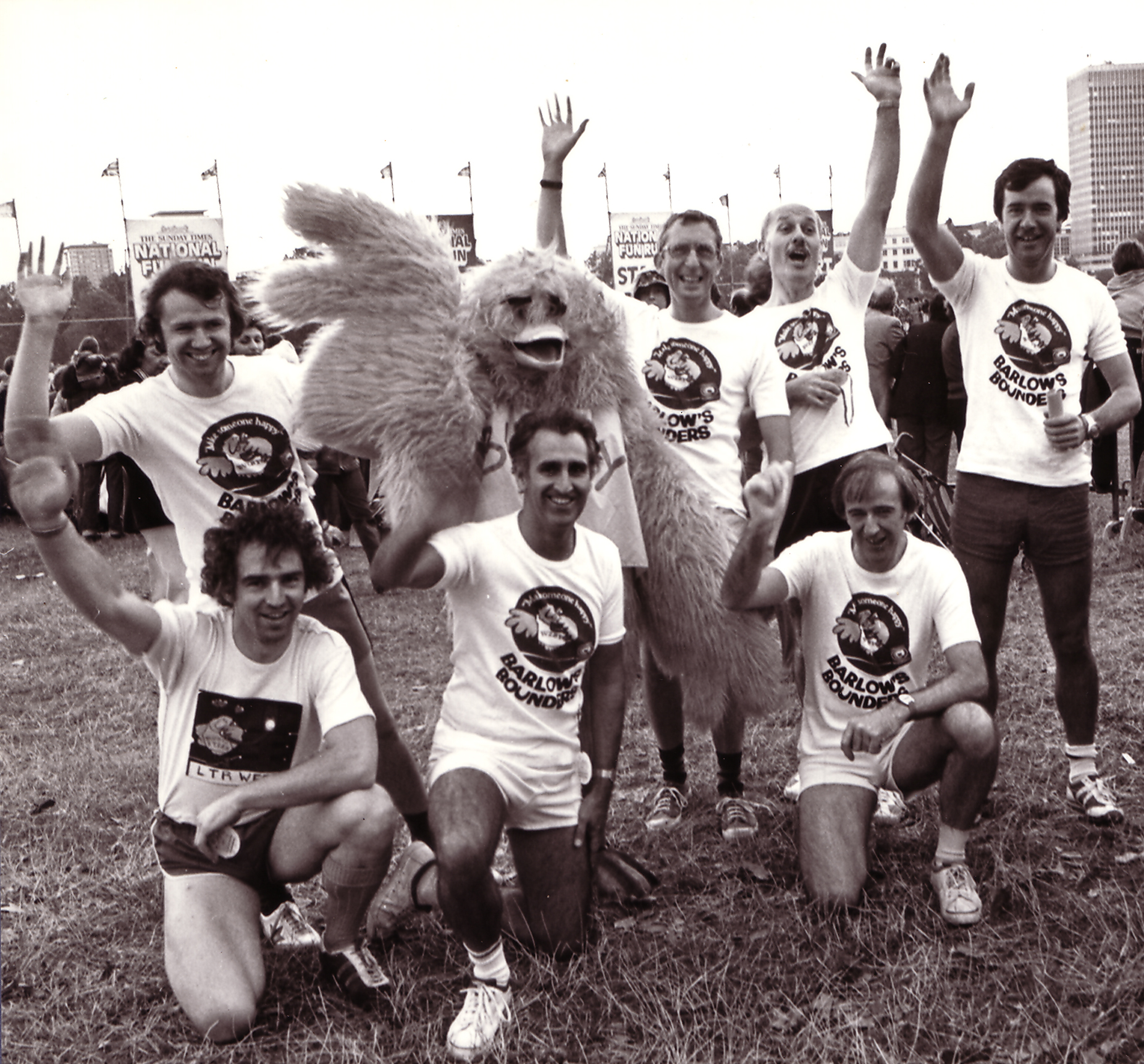
A group of runners from British Telecommunications with mascot Buzby at a fun run in London in the 1970s

== Overview ==
Buzby appeared in a series of television commercials with the catchphrase: "Make someone happy with a phone call". Buzby's voice was provided by Bernard Cribbins, and the character was animated by Charlie Jenkins of Trickfilm Studios, London.

The campaign spawned many marketing items, such as toys, badges, a comic strip in TV Comic, and books, and lasted until well into the 1980s. British Telecom produced and sold a "Buzby" wristwatch with Buzby perched on the second hand.
