= Uncle and His Detective =

1966 children's story by J. P. Martin

- First edition
- Author: J. P. Martin
- Illustrator: Quentin Blake
- Language: English
- Series: The Uncle series
- Publisher: Jonathan Cape
- Publication date: 1966
- Publication place: UK
- Media type: Print
- Pages: 172
- Preceded by: Uncle Cleans Up
- Followed by: Uncle and the Treacle Trouble

Uncle and his Detective (1966) is a children's story by J. P. Martin, as part of his Uncle series of books.

== Plot summary ==
The story begins with the arrival not of a detective, but of disaster: Badfort is for sale, but when Uncle decides to buy it, demolish it, and build a pleasantly appointed park on the site, he is forestalled. Beaver Hateman has sold it cheaply to someone on the condition that he, Hateman, is allowed to stay on as a paying guest. Forgetting that the man who has bought Badfort is certain to regret the "bargain", Uncle tries to console himself by continuing his never-ending exploration of Homeward. He comes across the Art Gallery, reached along Quack Walk between two ponds crowded with noisy and aggressive ducks. En route he discovers the mysterious Crack House, which is the lair of a vicious and horribly squawking creature, half-bat, half-bird, called Batty. After visiting the Art Gallery and discovering that Batty is persecuting the curator and his family, Uncle has Batty expelled from Crack House and pursues a report of buried treasure there. Constant trips to Crack House have accustomed the ducks to passers-by, and Uncle's miserly friend Alonzo S. Whitebeard foolishly tries to take advantage of their docility.

This time the ducks were much quieter. They seemed so docile and friendly that Whitebeard captured one and tried to hide it under his beard, having visions of hot duck for supper. The duck nearly bit a piece out of his chest and Whitebeard flung it from him with a roar of pain.

By now the Detective of the title has appeared: an elegant and astute fox called A. B. Fox, who proves worthy of his hire (five shillings a day) as the Badfort Crowd, sniffing treasure from afar, are constantly on the prowl. After many adventures, Uncle eventually tracks down the treasure, an unimaginably vast block of softly glowing gold (or dlog, as they code-name it), beats off a final attack from the Badfort Crowd, and enjoys the acclaim of the grateful inhabitants of Homeward when he decides to distribute the gold for the common good. But the celebrations are interrupted briefly with a reminder that the Badfort Crowd, though defeated, are far from down and out. A group of young badgers are singing a song in praise of Uncle when:

[A]n atrocious raucous voice away on the edge of the crowd interrupted them. 'See that pompous humbug Unc/On the platform raise his trunk.'

The Badfort group has resumed sole occupancy of its headquarters.

== Other media ==
Uncle and his Detective was read by Spike Milligan on the BBC1 series Jackanory in 1971.
