= BEEB =

Children's magazine

- Issue 10, a typical mid-run example of the publication
- Categories: Children, teenagers
- Frequency: Weekly
- Publisher: Polystyle Publications
- First issue: 29 January 1985
- Final issue Number: 11 June 1985; 20
- Country: UK

BEEB was a weekly children's magazine centred on the BBC's most popular programmes at the time of its publication. It was published by Polystyle Publications and was created as a competitor to ITV's Look-in magazine. It lasted 20 issues between 29 January 1985 and 11 June 1985. There was no announcement in the last issue, or any resolution to the ongoing comic serials.

== Typical contents ==
1. One By One. This followed the popular zoo vet series, based on the David Taylor books.
2. Grange Hill. These were specially written stories. Drawn by John Armstrong. Each issue's Grange Hill comic was 3 pages long.
3. The Tripods. These were very well drawn stories, partly in colour on three pages. Drawn by John M. Burns. As the series progressed an attempt was made to appeal to female readers by introducing the young woman character of Fizzio.
4. Bananaman, in colour, on a single page. These have been reprinted in The Dandy, the third comic that Bananaman appeared in, after Nutty and BEEB, and before The Funday Times.
5. The Family-Ness, in colour, on a single page.
6. General articles about BBC programmes, usually children's shows, with frequent references to Blue Peter, Doctor Who and Grange Hill.
7. Pin-ups of pop stars and other celebrities.
8. Competitions and letters from the readers.

== Issues ==
#	Topic:	Release date:
1	Doctor Who and Blue Peter	5 January – 4 February 1985
2	Wham! and Grange Hill	5–11 February 1985
3	Howard Jones and Doctor Who	12–18 February 1985
4	EastEnders and Peter Shilton	19–25 February 1985
5	Kim Wilde and Roaring Boys	26 February – 4 March 1985
6	Shakin' Stevens and Grandmaster Flash	5–11 March 1985
7	Howard Jones, Daley Thompson, Keith Chegwin	12–18 March 1985
8	Tears For Fears and Paul Young	19–25 March 1985
9	Hazell Dean and Helena Shenel	26 March – 1 April 1985
10	The Power Station	2–8 April 1985
11	Matt Bianco, Floella Benjamin and Nik Kershaw	9–15 April 1985
12	Duran Duran, Bryan Adams and John Shackley	16–22 April 1985
14	Frankie Goes To Hollywood and Paul King	23–29 April 1985
13		30 April – 6 May 1985
15	Big Sound Authority, Fame and Lucinda Green	7–13 May 1985
16	Gary Glitter	14–20 May 1985
17	Tina Turner, Belouis Some and Thin Lizzy	21–27 May 1985
18	John Taylor, Boy George and Go West	28 May – 3 June 1985
19	Kim Wilde, Larry Hagman and Stephen Duffy	4–10 June 1985
20	Alannah Currie, China Crisis and The Beatles	11–17 June 1985
