= Wicked Wanda =

British comic strip

Oh, Wicked Wanda!
- Wicked Wanda on cover of Penthouse by Ron Embleton

Publication information
- Publisher: Penthouse
- Genre: Satirical adult comic strip
- Publication date: 1969-1979
- No. of issues: Oh! Wicked Wanda
- Main character(s): Wanda Von Kreesus; Candyfloss; Homer Sapiens; J. Hoover Grud; German Grrrr (a parody of Germaine Greer)

Creative team
- Written by: Frederic Mullally
- Artist(s): Ron Embleton, Brian Forbes

Oh, Wicked Wanda! is a British full-colour, satirical adult comic strip, written by Frederic Mullally, and drawn by Ron Embleton. The strip regularly appeared in Penthouse magazine from 1973 to 1980. In the 1960s, Ron Embleton, already a veteran comic book artist, had worked extensively for TV Century 21 comic, illustrating stories based on the television programmes Stingray, Thunderbirds, and Captain Scarlet and the Mysterons, amongst others. For Wicked Wanda Embleton painted the panels in watercolour. Frederic Mullally began his career in the 1940s as a journalist, and by the time of Wicked Wanda he had already become a successful novelist.

Prior to the illustrated strip format, the character of Wanda appeared as an illustrated story in Penthouse, from September 1969 to October 1979. This was written by Mullally and illustrated by Brian Forbes.

== Background ==
The strip's characters appeared naked or partially clothed, and great care was given to the female form, especially the breasts and buttocks. In line with the relatively explicit direction that Penthouse had taken following the "Pubic Wars", the strip featured pubic hair.

Although male characters occasionally appeared nude, their genitals were not often shown and they were shown mostly in the background, with none of the sometimes gratuitous appearances that often was true with regard to female characters.

A running gag in several of the early comic strips features a pastiche of Little Annie Fanny (published by Playboy, Penthouse's main competitor) in which the character is found out to have fake breasts or buttocks which deflate when popped.

== Main characters ==
=== Wanda Von Kreesus ===
A beautiful black-haired heiress to a multi-million-dollar fortune, 19-year-old Wanda Von Kreesus was a "man-hating" lesbian. She lived in an old castle called the Schloss (the German word for 'castle') on Lake Zurich, Switzerland, and ran a bank which, among other things, contained secrets that could bring down world governments.

Her adventurous travels took her to such exotic locales as:

- Arabia
- Tibet
- Europe
- India
- New York City
- Hollywood
- Las Vegas
- Disneyland

She also travelled through time, courtesy of a time machine, visiting France during the French Revolution, England during the signing of Magna Carta, and Germany during World War II, before briefly visiting the future and returning to the present. In later parts of the series, she would have a handful of male 'toys' whom she would use and abuse until they died of exhaustion, but her sexual preference was almost exclusively for women.

=== Candyfloss ===
Candyfloss is a 16-year-old blonde nymphet was originally sent as a "present" to Wanda's father, but his daughter claimed her as her own. Wanda encouraged her father to chase Candyfloss, resulting in his death from exhaustion and enabling Wanda to claim her inheritance.

Wanda often called her "Pusscake", while Candyfloss' nickname for Wanda was "Boo'ful". The term "candyfloss" is the common UK name for "cotton candy". Candyfloss was apparently pansexual, having sex with anyone who came her way, much to Wanda's annoyance.

=== Automobiles ===
Wanda drove a Supo Delecto Peniso Flagrante sports car, which, as its name implies, resembled a phallus and was capable of attaining a top speed of 160 miles per hour. The license plate bore the alphanumeric designation "FKU2". Sometimes, her auxiliary automobile, a Rolls-Royce station wagon, followed.

=== Puss International Force ===
Throughout her adventures, Wanda was also assisted by her elite army of "butch-dikes", the Puss International Force, or PIF, the commander of which was General German Grrrr, which is a play on renowned feminist Germaine Greer.

=== Homer Sapiens and J. Hoover Grud ===
A "resident egghead", Homer Sapiens, and the Neanderthal-like "chief jailer" and master torturer J. Hoover Grud (a reference to FBI founder J. Edgar Hoover) provided the brains and muscle needed to support Wanda's many adventures. Although Grud looked like a caveman, he was a sensitive intellectual who expressed his aspirations only to himself, never to others.

Sapiens was a mad scientist and former Nazi collaborator. Wanda called him "Eggbonce" ("bonce" is slang for head). Sapiens was a sadism masochist who enjoyed nothing better but a beating from Wanda, either as a reward or as a punishment, so either way he won.

=== Walter Von Kreesus ===
The preserved cadaver of her degenerate father was seated upon a throne under a green glass dome. On occasion, Wanda sought advice from him after establishing a psychic or spiritual link with the corpse. During his lifetime, Candyfloss, Wanda's paramour, was one of the many women whom Walter kept as a mistress. The source of his great fortune that Wanda later inherited was Grigori Rasputin, who in 1916 was attempting to lodge for safe keeping a large fortune in jewels in the Swiss bank that von Kreesus was working for. Rasputin's untimely death, however, left the large hoard in von Kreesus' possession. Needless to say, the bank heard no more from Herr von Kreesus. He then proceeded to increase his fortune still further through various underhand dealings, with amongst others, Vladimir Lenin, to whom von Kreesus lent a train fare when the communist leader was on his way to a 3 April 1917 important meeting.

== Cultural and political allusions ==
The strip was replete with inside jokes and references to popular and classical culture. For example, a member of Wanda's entourage lay naked reading William S. Burroughs' novel Naked Lunch while a second fornicated with a swan, recalling William Butler Yeats' poem, "Leda and the Swan", based on the myth about Zeus's fornication, in the guise of a swan, with Leda.

Many politicians and artists were caricatured in the strip, including a drenched and apparently besotted Ted Kennedy, who appeared in several panels throughout the strip's ten-year run, wearing an ever-present '76 presidential campaign ribbon. His appearance was a not-so-subtle reference to the incident in which he drove off the Chappaquiddick Bridge, killing his companion, Mary Jo Kopechne. Rival politicians, including Richard Nixon, were treated with the same degree of satirical ridicule. For example, Nixon was frequently shown as a sometimes machine-gun-toting gangster.

== Caricatures ==
The strips frequently included caricatures of famous people, especially politicians. For example, in the debut strip, Wanda and Candyfloss visit Marie Tussaud's "waxworks", passing the likenesses of Richard Nixon, Spiro Agnew, Charles de Gaulle, Lyndon Johnson, Fidel Castro, Henry Kissinger, and Mao Zedong, among others, as they make their way toward the museum's "Chamber of Horrors". These satirical portraits were usually given names similar to the names of the people they parodied: Marlon Blondo (aka Burpo), Henry Kissarun, Norman Mailman, and Herod Huge, for example. Senator Ted Kennedy was invariably depicted standing in a pool of liquid, a reference to the Chappaquiddick incident.

Other famous figures that Wanda and Candyfloss encountered include Bob Hope, John Wayne, W. C. Fields, Mae West, Clark Gable, Humphrey Bogart, Marilyn Monroe, Stan Laurel, Oliver Hardy, Muhammad Ali, Salvador Dalí, Benjamin Spock, Charles Bronson, Lee Marvin, Liberace, Howard Hughes, Harold Wilson, Edward Heath, Ronald Reagan, Kirk Douglas, Idi Amin, William Conrad, Golda Meir, Grigori Rasputin and Billie Jean King.

When an image was particularly effective at parodying a politician, an entertainment personality, or another public figure, it was repeated. For example, Marlon Brando (sometimes called "Burpo"), who was known for his love of good eating and his enormous weight gain, was often shown attired in a pin-striped suit, nonchalantly eating twirled spaghetti from a fork.

In addition, the names of caricatures were chosen with satirical effect in mind. Hence, Jane Fonda was christened "Jane Fondle" and Brando was named "Marlon Blando" during his Last Tango in Paris days but Marlon Burpo after his figure ballooned due to the rich foods he was fond of consuming in his later career.

The strip also included satirical sketches of well-known cartoon and comic strip characters, such as Mad magazine's Alfred E. Neuman; Playboy's Little Annie Fanny; Walt Disney's Seven Dwarfs, Mickey Mouse, and Donald Duck; Walt Kelly's Pogo, George Herriman's Krazy Kat, and Bud Fisher's Mutt and Jeff.

== First series ==
Episode One

On their first adventure, Wanda and Candyfloss decided to buy Marie Tussaud's "waxworks" as a way to acquire figures of famous men and women with whom to equip the "museum of living apes" that she planned to establish at the mansion that she has inherited from her father, Walter, the late King Gnome of Zurich. They, however, were disappointed with the exhibits, which were not sufficiently carnal for Wanda's tastes; as she told Candyfloss, "Tussaud’s was a real drag". Instead of "wax dummies", Wanda preferred deep-frozen "authentic, living flesh" for her "living tableaux of top personalities". Before leaving on their quest, Wanda inspected her PIF. She meted out punishment by flogging the backside of one of her troops, who afterward walked away with a smile on her face as a fellow soldier observed, "This is your second time around!"

Episode Two

On their second adventure, Wanda and Candyfloss undertook a quest to acquire "tableaux vivants" for Wanda's Museum of Misfits. Arriving at a villa in St. Trollop on the French Riviera, they visit the "pornophobe" adult film critic, Lord Cyril Bluestocking and Brigitte Bidet (Brigitte Bardot), their intended first acquisitions. After Candyfloss knocks Bluestocking unconscious, she helps Wanda transport him and Brigitte to Wanda's museum, where Homer Sapiens has the couple displayed with Bidet mounted (literally) as the museum's first exhibit.

Episode Three

In the third installment of the first adventure, Wanda and Candyfloss decided to add some politicians to their Museum of Misfits, and they went after California Governor Ronald Reagan.

Other episodes of the first series

Other chapters in their first adventure followed this same plot, with Wanda and Candyfloss obtaining such additional famous men and women for their Museum of Misfits as chess champion Bernie Fishfinger (Bobby Fischer), Martin Bormann, Willy Grabham (Billy Graham) and Jane Fondle (Jane Fonda).

== Oh, Wicked Wanda! (the book) ==
Penthouse published a compilation of the strip in a book in 1975.

== Replacement strip ==
Oh, Wicked Wanda! was replaced by Sweet Chastity, another comic illustrated by Ron Embleton and scripted by Penthouse's publisher, Bob Guccione.

== Wanda as nose art ==
In the tradition of George Petty and Alberto Vargas, whose pin-ups were the basis for much World War II aircraft Nose art, Wicked Wanda graced the nose of Boeing B-17 Flying Fortress, 44-83863, when it originally went on display at the United States Air Force Air Force Armament Museum, Eglin Air Force Base, Florida in 1975. The aircraft was later repainted in another scheme.
