= Uncle and the Battle for Badgertown =

1973 novel by J. P. Martin

- First edition
- Author: J. P. Martin
- Illustrator: Quentin Blake
- Language: English
- Series: The Uncle series
- Publisher: Jonathan Cape
- Publication date: 1973
- Publication place: UK
- Media type: Print
- Pages: 172
- Preceded by: Uncle and Claudius the Camel

Uncle and the Battle for Badgertown (1973) is a children's novel written by J. P. Martin, the last of his Uncle series of six books. It was illustrated, like the others in the series, by Quentin Blake.
