= Uncle Cleans Up =

- First edition cover.
- Author: J. P. Martin
- Illustrator: Quentin Blake
- Language: English
- Series: The Uncle series
- Publisher: Jonathan Cape
- Publication date: 1965
- Publication place: UK
- Media type: Print
- Pages: 176
- Preceded by: Uncle
- Followed by: Uncle and His Detective

Uncle Cleans Up (1965) is a children's story written by J. P. Martin as part of his Uncle series.

== Plot summary ==
In this story, Goodman the Cat joins Uncle's supporters. He is rescued from down-trodden and hungry service at Wizard Blenkinsop's and throws himself wholeheartedly into battle against Uncle's enemies, though never quite ridding himself of a propensity to steal fish and postage stamps. His fish-stealing gets him into trouble at Professor Gandleweaver's Fish-Frying Academy, and Uncle is forced to make a dignified exit as the crowd gathered to watch Gandleweaver's frying exhibition turns ugly:

The crowd began to hiss, and, as Uncle didn't want a row, he decided to withdraw and take action later. The moment he and his party got out of the crowd, they were forgotten. The Professor had started frying a conger eel in an enormous pan, and this is one of star turns; and nobody thinks about anything else when he does it.

The incident is seized on by the Badfort Crowd and written up in the usual lying and distorted way in The Badfort News, one of the many provocations offered by the newspaper that eventually lead Uncle to take action against it. Visiting its offices, he finds a young badger literally chained to the printing-press, whom he rescues before visiting well-deserved punishment on Beaver Hateman by kicking him far and high into Gaby's Marsh, where "the crabs are" and "the barking conger eels". As before, Uncle Cleans Up ends in Uncle's capture by the Badfort Crowd before he escapes, this time with the help of his loyal friend the Old Monkey, and a great battle is fought in which the Badfort Crowd are completely defeated—until next time. The last that is seen of Beaver Hateman is this:

Even for Uncle it was a great kick-up. Beaver Hateman was holding a huge lighted cigar in his hand, and the wind made it glow so that everyone could see in the sky what looked like a slowly soaring red light.

He comes down in Gaby's Marsh again, and vows in an insolent letter delivered to Uncle as the book closes that he will take a revenge "so fearful that anyone who speaks of it will develop lockjaw".

== Reprint ==
A hardcover edition of the collected Uncle stories was published in June 2008, from The New York Review Children's Collection (ISBN 1590172760). www.nyrb.com
