= R. N. Currey =

Ralph Nixon Currey (14 December 1907 – 18 November 2001) was a South African born poet, who wrote in English.

== Life ==
He was born in Mafeking, South Africa, the son of John Currey (1871–1959) and his wife Edith Vinnicombe (1881–1959). His father was an English Methodist minister who had come out with the British troops at the end of the Second Anglo-Boer War. He attended Kingswood School, Bath and Wadham College, Oxford. Currey married Stella Martin in 1932. He taught at Colchester Royal Grammar School from 1934 to 1973.

Currey was called up in 1941 to the Royal Corps of Signals before transferring to the Royal Artillery where he received his commission. In 1945 T. S. Eliot wrote to him about his work This Other Planet, telling him that he thought it was "the best war poetry in the correct sense of the term that I have seen in these past years".

Currey died at home in Colchester, England.

== Works ==
- Tiresias, Oxford University, 1940
- Heavy Guns, New English Weekly, 1942
- The Poetry Magazine July 1944
- This Other Planet, 1945
- Poems from India (Bombay, 1945) (London, 1946)
- Indian Landscape, Routledge, 1947
- Formal Spring, OUP, 1950
- Poets of the 1939-1945 War, British Council, 1951 (Longmans, 1967)
- Letters of a Natal sheriff: Thomas Phipson, 1969
- The Africa We Knew, David Philip, 1973
- Vinnicombe's Trek, 1989
- Collected Poems, James Currey publishers, 2001
