= Frederic Mullally =

British journalist, public relations executive, and novelist (1918–2014)

- Born: 25 February 1918; London, England
- Died: 7 September 2014 (aged 96); London, England
- Occupations: Journalist; novelist; public relations executive
- Years active: 1937–2014
- Notable work: Danse Macabre (1958); Clancy (1971); Oh, Wicked Wanda! (1969–1979)
- Spouses: Suzanne Warner (divorced); Rosemary Nicols (m. 1971; his death 2014)

Frederic Mullally (25 February 1918 – 7 September 2014) was a British journalist and author. He worked as a political editor and anti-fascist columnist in the post-war London press before co-founding the Mayfair public relations firm Mullally & Warner in 1950. From the late 1950s onward, he worked primarily as a novelist, publishing notable books including the bestseller Danse Macabre (1958) and the alternate history novel Hitler Has Won (1975).

== Early life and India ==
Mullally was born in London on 25 February 1918, of Irish descent and from a working-class background. As a teenager he paid his own passage to India, where he worked on The Statesman in Calcutta before becoming editor of the Sunday Standard in Bombay at approximately nineteen, one of the youngest editors of a national newspaper in India.

== Anti-fascist journalism ==
In 1939, Mullally returned to England aboard a German vessel from Bombay via Antwerp; the crew's singing of the Horst-Wessel-Lied convinced him that war was imminent and cemented his commitment to anti-fascism. On his return he worked as a sub-editor at The Financial News before becoming co-editor of Tribune in 1944 with Evelyn Anderson, where George Orwell was then literary editor. From 1946 he was political editor and columnist of the Sunday Pictorial, writing the column "Candid Commentary" for a paper with an estimated readership of ten million.

In 1944, Mullally and Fenner Brockway co-authored Death Pays a Dividend, a Left Book Club polemic against the international private arms trade. His 1946 book Fascism Inside England argued that Britain had no natural immunity to fascism; the historian Nigel Copsey later cited it in Anti-Fascism in Britain as an early identification of crypto-fascist organisations such as the British League of Ex-Servicemen.

In August 1947, Mullally used his Sunday Pictorial column to challenge the Mosleyite speaker Jeffrey Hamm at Ridley Road in Dalston, demanding ten minutes on his platform. At the meeting, despite a cordon of some 200 police, fascist supporters broke through and beat him to the ground. Members of the 43 Group intervened, breaking through the police lines to extract him; Mullally later said the group had saved his life. The following Sunday, with bodyguards provided by 43 Group chairman Geoffrey Bernerd, he addressed a large anti-fascist rally at the same site. A bullet was subsequently fired into his house and another posted to him with a threatening note. In 1949 he was selected as a prospective Labour parliamentary candidate for Finchley and Friern Barnet but withdrew.

== Mullally & Warner ==
In 1950, Mullally and his first wife, Suzanne Warner, an American publicist who had represented Howard Hughes in Britain, founded the public relations firm Mullally & Warner in Mayfair. The firm operated until 1955. Its clients included Audrey Hepburn, Frank Sinatra, Douglas Fairbanks Jr., J. Paul Getty, Vera Lynn, Yvonne De Carlo, Sonja Henie, Johnnie Ray, Jo Stafford, Les Paul and Mary Ford, the Festival Ballet, Picture Post, Oxford University Press and Cambridge University Press.

After the firm closed, Mullally worked for Picture Post from 1955 to 1956.

== Literary career ==
=== Novels ===
Mullally's first novel, Danse Macabre (published by Secker & Warburg, 1958; issued in the United States as Marianne by Bantam Books), was an international bestseller. It was followed by eleven further novels over the next three decades, ranging across thrillers, political fiction and alternate history.

His semi-autobiographical novel Clancy (1971), which traced the life of Frank Clancy — an Irish policeman's son who rises from working-class Hoxton through the General Strike, the rise of fascism and the upheavals of the 1960s to become a Fleet Street editor — was adapted by the BBC as the five-part serial Looking for Clancy, dramatised by Jack Pulman, produced by Richard Beynon and directed by Bill Hays. It was first broadcast on BBC Two from 24 May 1975, with a repeat in 1977, and starred Robert Powell as Clancy and Keith Drinkel as Dick Holt, with T. P. McKenna and Catherine Schell.

Hitler Has Won (1975) was an alternate history novel in which Hitler's early assault on the Soviet Union succeeds. The Encyclopedia of Science Fiction described it as "a competent presentation of what has become a very common alternate-history vision."

=== Oh, Wicked Wanda! ===
Mullally created Oh, Wicked Wanda!, a satirical adult feature for Penthouse magazine. It initially appeared as illustrated text stories with artwork by Brian Forbes, running from September 1969 to October 1979. From 1973 to 1980, it was also produced as a full-colour comic strip drawn by Ron Embleton. The strip followed the adventures of the would-be world conqueror Wanda Von Kreesus and her companion Candyfloss. It has been described as Penthouse publisher Bob Guccione's counterpart to Playboy's Little Annie Fanny. Mullally also wrote a short-lived newspaper strip, Amanda, for The Sun.

=== Non-fiction ===
In addition to his anti-fascist works, Mullally wrote The Silver Salver: The Story of the Guinness Family (Granada, 1981), a history spanning 250 years of the brewing, banking and missionary branches of the Guinness family. His final published book was Primo: The Story of 'Man-Mountain' Carnera (Robson Books, 1991), the first full-length biography of the Italian world heavyweight champion Primo Carnera.

=== The Sounds of Time ===
Mullally compiled and wrote, in collaboration with the BBC, The Sounds of Time, a dramatised documentary record album covering British history from 1934 to 1949. Narrated by John Snagge, the production covered events including the abdication of Edward VIII, Chamberlain's return from Munich, the Blitz, D-Day and VE Day.

== Personal life ==
Mullally's first marriage was to Suzanne Warner, the American publicist with whom he founded Mullally & Warner. On 27 September 1971, he married the actress Rosemary Nicols, best known for her role as Annabelle Hurst in the ITC series Department S. The couple subsequently lived in Malta and the United States before returning to London. He lived at various periods in Ibiza and Malta.

During the 1950s, Mullally had become friendly with the society osteopath Stephen Ward. Through Ward, he met Joy Lewis, the wife of former Labour MP John Lewis, and the two began an affair. Lewis subsequently won both a libel action and a divorce action against Mullally; the combined costs, estimated at £7,000, were financially ruinous. The vendetta Lewis developed as a result extended to Ward, and Philip Knightley, in An Affair of State (1987), identified it as a significant thread in the events that culminated in the Profumo affair of 1963, when Lewis passed information about Christine Keeler's relationships to the Labour MP George Wigg.

He died in London on 7 September 2014, aged 96.

== Selected bibliography ==
=== Fiction ===
- Danse Macabre (1958; US title: Marianne)
- Man with a Tin Trumpet (1961; US title: Sara)
- Split Scene (1963)
- The Assassins (1964)
- No Other Hunger (1966)
- The Prizewinner (1967)
- The Munich Involvement (1968)
- Clancy (1971)
- The Malta Conspiracy (1972)
- Venus Afflicted (1973)
- Hitler Has Won (1975)
- The Deadly Payoff (1976)
- The Daughters (1988)

=== Non-fiction ===
- Death Pays a Dividend (1944; with Fenner Brockway)
- Fascism Inside England (1946)
- The Penthouse Sexicon (1968)
- The Silver Salver: The Story of the Guinness Family (1981)
- Primo: The Story of 'Man-Mountain' Carnera (1991)
