= Uncle and Claudius the Camel =

1969 novel by J. P. Martin

- First edition
- Author: J. P. Martin
- Illustrator: Quentin Blake
- Language: English
- Series: The Uncle series
- Publisher: Jonathan Cape
- Publication date: 1969
- Publication place: UK
- Media type: Print
- Pages: 192
- Preceded by: Uncle and the Treacle Trouble
- Followed by: Uncle and the Battle for Badgertown

Uncle and Claudius the Camel (1969) is a children's novel written by J. P. Martin, the fifth of his Uncle book series of six books. It was illustrated, like the others in the series, by Quentin Blake.

== Plot summary ==
Uncle rarely goes on vacation because it is challenging to find hotels with beds that are large enough for an elephant. However, when he goes to Sunset Beach, he hopes to relax and have a change of scenery. Unfortunately, shortly after arriving, Uncle is visited by Claudius, a polite camel, and his fifty companions, who bring news of a problem at Uncle's castle, Homeward.

After Claudius arrives, Uncle's vacation is continuously disrupted by a series of unexpected events. Uncle and his loyal companions help rescue vacationers from the mysterious Wheel House, use paraballoons at the Fun Fair, and confront a terrifying monster at Water-Step Hill. They also become involved in a noisy dispute between Idleass and Hot Donk, encounter Fishy William at Comfort Cove, have breakfast with a miraculous Singing Flower, and enjoy high tea with the Glenmore Giraffes. Throughout these fantastic adventures, Uncle faces many challenges, including being captured and held captive by the Badfort Crowd in Beaver Hateman’s Chamber of Horrors. The question remains: will Uncle be able to escape this time?
