= Uncle and the Treacle Trouble =

1967 novel by J. P. Martin

- First edition
- Author: J. P. Martin
- Illustrator: Quentin Blake
- Language: English
- Series: The Uncle series
- Publisher: Jonathan Cape
- Publication date: 1967
- Publication place: UK
- Media type: Print
- Pages: 184
- Preceded by: Uncle and His Detective
- Followed by: Uncle and Claudius the Camel

Uncle and the Treacle Trouble (1967) is a children's novel written by J. P. Martin, the fourth of his Uncle series of six books. It was illustrated, like the others in the series, by Quentin Blake.

== Plot summary ==
In this story, a great mural, commissioned by the King of the Badgers after the defeat of the Badfort crowd at Crack House, is to be painted on the wall at Homeward by Waldovenison Smeare. To protect the mural while it is being painted Uncle employs a watchman called Sleepy Sam, who sleeps in a wheelbarrow and is paid two loaves of bread and two quarts of Koolvat. Sleepy Sam is immediately put to work when Beaver Hateman tries to climb in through Uncle's window and is sent packing back to Badfort.

Uncle has a mystery tour with The Respectable Horses past a small monument to "Kind Cuthbert", Snowstorm Volcano and finally a picnic at Ezra Lake. They are interrupted by Beaver Hateman running his own tour in a decrepit bus. He verbally abuses the assembled party and calls the Mud Ghost (really Hateman's friend Hootman) who flings mud at Uncle, who dodges, and hits Hateman in the mouth.

Jimmy Linseed comes to see Uncle with a problem, he wants to open a Grocers for the inhabitants of Lonely Tower, the Crookball people. Uncle, Linseed, Cloutman, Cowgill, the Old Monkey and the One-Armed Badger set off for Lonely Tower.
