= Diddy Men =

Fictitious small characters popularised by Ken Dodd

The Diddy Men are fictional characters whose invention is often attributed to the Liverpudlian comedian Ken Dodd. However, they have existed in Merseyside mythology for much longer and, along with the Treacle and Jam Butty Mines of Knotty Ash, had been referred to in the earlier act of another Liverpool comedian, Arthur Askey. When Ken Dodd began playing seaside resorts, he made famous his home area of Knotty Ash in Liverpool and popularised the Diddy Men as a miniature race of people who inhabited it. The word diddy is an informal British word for "little".

The Diddy Men were originally an unseen joke but after a while began to appear on stage with Dodd, delighting children in the audience. They also appeared in Dodd's BBC television programmes in the 1960s, as marionettes. The Diddy Men tend to wear slightly oversized adult clothes in flamboyant style, including tall furry hats.

== The Song of the Diddy Men ==
The Diddy Men have a song, once released as a single, titled "The Song of the Diddy Men", sung in a high-pitched Chipmunk‐style voice. It includes the chorus: "We are the Diddy Men / Doddy's dotty Diddy Men / We are the Diddy Men who come from Knotty Ash". Another song, "Doddy's Diddy Party", featured the refrain "Tonight's the night the Diddy Men paint the town / We'll lose our blues, and let our Diddy hair down". There were several other songs, including "Diddycombe Fair", a spoof of the well-known West Country song "Widecombe Fair".

== Actors ==
On stage the Diddy Men are normally played by children or adults with dwarfism. On TV and in some stage performances, Dodd used a ventriloquist's puppet of the Dicky Mint character. These days the Diddy Men are rarely seen outside pantomime season. Carol Vorderman, of Countdown fame, played a Diddy Man as a child.
