= Danny Fox (artist) =

British artist

Danny Fox (born 1986) is a British artist from St. Ives, Cornwall.

== Career ==
In 2004, Fox moved to London. He squatted in Brixton and took odd jobs washing dishes in order to buy brushes.

Danny Fox lived in Los Angeles from 2016 to 2020.

== Themes ==
Danny Fox's images have vibrant array of colours that look tempered or worn down. Fox is inspired by artists such as Richard Simkin, Matisse, Henry Taylor and also painters from St Ives, such as Ben Nicholson and Alfred Wallis.

His subjects include horses, boxers, female nudes, birds and fruits.

== Solo exhibitions ==
- 2021, The Sweet and Burning Hills, Alexander Berggruen, New York, NY
  - Danny Fox & Kingsley Ifill: Eye For A Sty, Tooth For The Roof, Eighteen Gallery, Copenhagen
- 2019, Danny Fox: Some Mornings Catch a Wraith, Berggruen Gallery, San Francisco, CA
  - Doped, Roped and Horoscoped, Eighteen Gallery, Copenhagen, Denmark
- 2018, Danny Fox, V1 Gallery at CHART Art Fair, Copenhagen, Denmark
  - Blood Spots On Apple Flesh, Zidoun-Bossuyt Gallery, Luxembourg
- 2017, Mitre Delta, Bill Brady Gallery, Miami, FL
- 2016, A Spoon With The Bread Knife, V1 Gallery, Copenhagen, Denmark
  - Adder Among Choughs, S|2 Sotheby's, Los Angeles, CA
  - Onions Under Water, S|2 Sotheby's, New York, NY
- 2015, As He Bowed His Head To Drink, The Redfern Gallery, London, UK
- 2014, White Horses, C n B Gallery, London, UK
- 2013, Bloom, Plumbline Gallery, St. Ives, UK

== Group exhibitions ==
- ·2020, Animal Kingdom, Alexander Berggruen, New York, NY
  - Crowd, Hannah Barry Gallery, London, UK
  - I Won't Bite, curated by Brooke Wise, NeueHouse, Los Angeles, CA
- 2019, Words, Alexander Berggruen, New York, NY
  - Punch, Curated by Nina Chanel Abney, Jeffrey Deitch, Los Angeles, CA
- 2018, Boy Meets Girl, Choi & Lager, Cologne, Germany
- 2017, Folklore, Sade Gallery, Los Angeles, CA
  - Iconoclasts: Art out of the mainstream, Saatchi Gallery, London, UK
  - Horses, Eighteen Gallery, Copenhagen, Denmark
  - What Is This Place?, Newlyn Art Gallery, Penzance, UK
- 2016, Human Condition, The Hospital, Los Angeles, CA
  - Chart Fair, V1 Gallery, Copenhagen, Denmark
  - Character, V1 Gallery, Copenhagen, Denmark
  - 35 Works On Paper, BEERS, London, UK
  - Parlor, V1 Gallery, Volta 12, Basel, Switzerland
  - Fresh Cuts, Eric Firestone Gallery, New York, NY
- 2015, Royal Rumble, The Cremlin, London, UK
- 2014, Top Guns, Paul Loya Gallery, Los Angeles, CA
  - 30 years of the future, Castlefield Gallery, Manchester, UK
  - You Can't Put Your Arms Around A Memory, Faux Pas Gallery, Moscow, Russia
  - Y Brutales Matanzas!, Maison 1575, Paris, France
- 2013, Deserts Of Humanity, Display Gallery, London, UK
- 2012, Young British Alcoholics, Eternal Youth, London, UK
- 2011, Winter Show, Millennium Gallery, St. Ives, UK
