= Terry Hall (ventriloquist) =

English ventriloquist (1926–2007)

Terence Hall (20 November 1926 – 3 April 2007) was an English ventriloquist. He appeared regularly on television with his puppet, Lenny the Lion, whose catchphrase was "Aw, don't embawass me!" Hall is credited with being one of the first ventriloquists to use a non-human puppet.

== Biography ==
Hall was born in Chadderton, Lancashire, where his parents ran a working men's club. He was educated at St Patrick's School in Oldham and at De La Salle College in Pendleton, Salford. Hall initially worked as a ventriloquist with a boy dummy, named Mickey Finn, and won a talent show aged 15.

Hall created Lenny the Lion in 1954 after he visited the zoo while working at the summer season in Blackpool. Lenny was made from an old fox fur and papier-mâché, with a golf ball for the nose. He originally had a mouthful of fearsome teeth, but they were removed at the suggestion of singer Anne Shelton to avoid scaring children in the audience.

Hall and Lenny first appeared on BBC Television in 1956, in a variety show titled Dress Rehearsal; this was also Eric Sykes's television debut. The Lenny the Lion Show ran from 1957 to 1960; it was followed by Lenny's Den in 1959 to 1961, and the pop music show Pops and Lenny from 1962 to 1963. In 1958, Bill Mevin created a comic strip based on Lenny the Lion. Hall visited the United States in 1958, making his debut on The Ed Sullivan Show with Lenny that year. Hall and Lenny appeared on stage in Blackpool and on television throughout the 1960s. The Beatles made one of their early TV appearances in a 1963 episode of Pops and Lenny, singing "From Me to You" and "Please, Please Me". David Bowie's father, Hayward Jones, worked on the show, and launched the Lenny the Lion Fan Club. Lenny advertised Trebor mints for three years. Hall released a single, "Lenny's Bath Time", in 1963.

During the 1957–58 English football season, Hall (despite being a staunch Oldham Athletic fan) took Lenny to the Den, the home of Millwall F.C., and 'allowed' Lenny to pose with his "fellow Lions" for publicity shots, much to the delight of all present in the ground.

Hall and Lenny continued to work in variety through the 1970s, appearing on television in programmes such as Crackerjack and 3-2-1. From 1977 to 1980, Hall regularly appeared in the educational television programme Reading With Lenny. He wrote the Kevin the Kitten series of children's reading books that accompanied the series.

Hall's first marriage, to Kathleen Mary Hall, was ended by her death in 1978; the marriage produced two daughters, Beverley and Melanie. He married for a second time in 1980, to dance teacher Denise Francis. He suffered from Alzheimer's disease in later life, and died in 2007 in Coventry aged 80. Harry Brünjes, a long-standing family friend, gave the eulogy at the service.
