= Big Sound Authority =

UK musical group

- Origin: London, England
- Genres: Rock, new wave, mod revival, pop rock, soul
- Years active: 1983–1986
- Label: Source Records
- Past members: Tony Burke (vocals/guitar); Julie Hadwen (vocals); Martin Wilson (bass); Steve Martinez (drums); Mace Carnochan (keyboards); Greg Brown (saxophone); Frank Seago (trombone); Kevin White (trumpet)

Big Sound Authority were an English pop band.

The group was formed in 1983 after Tony Burke (ex-Directions) and Julie Hadwen both wrote to Paul Weller, who was looking for new artists for his then emerging Respond Records label. Hadwen replied to the same advertisement as Tracie Young. Weller introduced them to each other and the newly formed Big Sound Authority recorded the song "History of the World" for a Respond Records compilation album, Love the Reason. They toured with other Respond artists such as Tracie and the Questions and were offered a recording contract by Weller, but decided to turn it down.

They signed instead for the MCA Records imprint Source Records in 1984, and released "This House (Is Where Your Love Stands)" in 1985, which was their biggest hit. The band split up in 1986, after releasing three more singles and an album, An Inward Revolution.

They supported the Kane Gang on tour in 1984, and in 1985 appeared at the Montreux Jazz Festival and the British Big Sound Authority tour. TV appearances included Top of the Pops, Oxford Road Show, The Tube, The Old Grey Whistle Test, and Wogan. They also did Radio One sessions for both Bruno Brookes and Janice Long.

A live DVD, This House Is Where Your Love Stands, named after their biggest hit, was released in 2006.

== Discography ==
=== Albums ===
- An Inward Revolution (1985)

=== Singles ===
- "This House (Is Where Your Love Stands)"/"I Miss My Baby" (1985) - UK No. 21
- "A Bad Town"/"Excuse Me Please" (1985) - UK No. 54
- "Moving Heaven and Earth"/"Somebody Up There Likes Her" (1985)
- "Don't Let Our Love Start a War"/"A Family Thing" (1986)
