= J. P. Martin =

English author (1879-1966)

- Born: 1879; Scarborough, North Riding of Yorkshire, UK
- Died: March 24, 1966 (aged 86); Timberscombe, Somerset, UK
- Spouse(s): Annie "Nancy" Mann (m. 1906; died 1944) Jane Jenny Sowerbutts née Mann (m. 1947)
- Writing career
- Genre: Fiction writer
- Notable work: Uncle series of children's stories

John Percival Martin (1879 – 24 March 1966) was an English author best known for his Uncle series of children's stories.

== Life ==
Martin was the son of John Martin, a Wesleyan Methodist minister, and his wife Ellen Fowler, daughter of the Rev. Philip Fowler, another Wesleyan, and his wife Mary. Philip Fowler was the brother of Mary Fowler, wife of the Pacific missionary James Calvert.

John Percival, known in the family as Percy, was born in Scarborough in the North Riding of Yorkshire in the summer of 1879, the fifth of seven children of whom one died before he was born. His younger sister Dora (Theodora Fowler Martin, 1882–1961) is also known as a writer, under the name Dora Fowler Martin. While his two elder brothers were sent to Kingswood School, founded by John Wesley, John was not. His elder sister Mary Calvert (May) went to Trinity Hall School, Southport, and then university. His parents feeling he was not suited to boarding school, he attended local day schools in the northern cities and towns where his father ministered to Methodist circuits.

In 1898, the Martin family was based in Dewsbury, and John was working in the accounts department of the local steel works. He was asked to join the Wesleyan Leeds mission, which for some years had been reconstructed with the ministry of Samuel Chadwick. Shortly he became a candidate for the ministry, and was given a district missionary responsibility in Halifax and Bradford.

Martin became a Methodist minister in 1903, and then served as a missionary in South Africa: he chose reconstruction work after the Second Anglo-Boer War, over his father's wish that he should go to Fiji. His uncle James Calvert Fowler had been posted to Kimberley, Northern Cape and the diamond mines. Percy had met his future wife Nancy at the Leeds Mission, and before he left came to understanding that they would marry. In 1904 he was placed first in Ventersdorp. From there he was exchanged to Potchefstroom, and was then sent across the Transvaal to Pilgrim's Rest and Sabie, a gold-mining area, living first at Lydenburg since the Pilgrim's Rest church had been destroyed in the war.

Now married, John and Nancy Martin moved to Roodepoort in 1907. They were transferred to the large Wesleyan church at Mafeking in 1910.

Returning with his family to England in 1913, Martin became a Wesleyan chaplain at Wycliffe College, Gloucestershire. He was an army chaplain in Palestine during the World War I. After World War II he lived in the village of Timberscombe in Somerset, where he died in March 1966.

== The Uncle series ==
The Uncle books are:

- Uncle (1964)
- Uncle Cleans Up (1965)
- Uncle and His Detective (1966)
- Uncle and the Treacle Trouble (1967)
- Uncle and Claudius the Camel (1970)
- Uncle and the Battle for Badgertown (1973)

The Uncle of the six books in the series is a very rich elephant living in a very large house called Homeward. He is plagued by a group of enemies concerned with puncturing his pretensions, and driving home the charge, true enough, that he once stole a bicycle.

Homeward is hard to describe, but try to think of about a hundred skyscrapers all joined together and surrounded by a moat with a drawbridge over it, and you'll get some idea. The towers are of many colours, and there are bathing pools and gardens amongst them, also switchback railways running from tower to tower, and water-chutes from top to bottom.

Uncle has friends and supporters, including the Old Monkey, the One-Armed Badger, the cat Goodman, Noddy Ninety, Cloutman, the King of the Badgers, and Butterskin Mute. He is the sworn enemy of the inhabitants of Badfort, an enormous derelict fortress that blights the landscape in front of Homeward. Living in there are the Badfort gang, nominally headed by the Hateman family, Beaver, Nailrod Snr, Nailrod Jnr, Filljug, and Sigismund, with the support of Flabskin, Oily Joe, the dwarvish, cowardly, skewer-throwing Isidore Hitmouse, the scheming ghost Hootman, and Jellytussle, an animated mound of bluish jelly.

== Reception ==
Initial reviews of the series in the 1960s by Penelope Mortimer and Geoffrey Moorhouse were favorable. In 1977 John Rowe Townsend wrote in 25 Years of British Children's Books "There are several Uncle books, all inconsequentially episodic and hilariously illustrated by Quentin Blake". The Oxford Companion to Children's Literature (1984) commented on its "wildest schoolboy-style inventions and implausibilities, narrated with dead-pan humour."

The Economist noted in 2005 that the stories "which focus on the doings of the eponymous hero, an elephant and benevolent dictator, were first published in the 1960s, and still enjoy a cult following." Imogen Russell Williams wrote in 2007 "If there was ever a children's series generating fanatical, "cult" adoration, this is it."

== Reprints ==
The first book was reprinted in paperback in 2000 by Red Fox: ISBN 0-09-943869-0. See also ISBN 0-09-941141-5. Hardcover reprints of the first two volumes were published by the New York Review Books in 2007-2008 (ISBN 1-59017-239-6 and ISBN 1-59017-276-0).

In March 2013, a Kickstarter campaign was announced to reprint all six Uncle books in an omnibus edition. The reprint had the support of — and contributions from — several authors and illustrators, including Neil Gaiman, Justin Pollard, Garth Nix, Martin Rowson, Andy Riley, Kate Summerscale, and Richard Ingrams. The campaign was fully funded in a little over four hours. The book was published on 31 October 2013 under the title of The Complete Uncle, ISBN 978-1783062836.

== Family ==
In 1906 Martin married Annie "Nancy" Mann (died 1944), daughter of Michael Urwin Mann, in Johannesburg. He later married as his second wife Jane Jenny Sowerbutts née Mann, in 1947. He had four children, two girls and two boys, from his first marriage. Martin's Uncle stories were first told to his children before he wrote them down for a wider audience.

The eldest child was Helen Estella Martin (1907–1994), known as Stella Martin. She was to 1984 her father's official biographer, her work appearing in 2017 as Stella Martin Currey edited by James Martin Currey, under the title J.P. Martin: Father of Uncle: A Master in the Great English Nonsense Tradition 1879–1966; and also editor of the three Uncle books that appeared after his death.

Stella Martin worked from the early 1920s as a journalist on the Bristol Times and Mirror. At the end of the decade the Time and Mirror, owned by the Berry Group (at one point Allied Newspapers) was caught up in a circulation war with the Bristol Evening World (owned by national rivals the Rothermeres). It resulted in Stella being moved from writing aimed at a female audience, to being a "zoo correspondent". For a time she provided copy influenced by her father's juvenile fiction. In 1932 the Time and Mirror folded, and later that year Stella married Ralph Nixon Currey, a friend of the family. In 1934 the couple encouraged J. P. Martin to write down the "Uncle" stories.

== Sources ==
- Lonsdale, Sarah (2020). Rebel Women Between the Wars: Fearless Writers and Adventurers. Manchester University Press. ISBN 978-1-5261-3711-1.
- Martin, J. P. (28 January 2018). J.P. Martin: Father of Uncle, including the Unpublished Uncle. Troubador Publishing Ltd. ISBN 978-1-78803-106-6.
