= Ron Embleton =

British illustrator (1930–1988)

- Born: Ronald Sydney Embleton; 6 October 1930 London, England
- Died: 13 February 1988 (aged 57) Bournemouth, Dorset, England
- Areas: Illustrator, Painter
- Notable works: Oh, Wicked Wanda!

Ronald Sydney Embleton (6 October 1930 – 13 February 1988) was a British illustrator who gained fame as a comics artist. In the 1950s and 1960s, Embleton also pursued a career as an oil painter, and he exhibited his works widely in Britain, Germany, Australia, Canada and the USA. He was a member of the London Sketch Club and the National Society of Painters, Sculptors and Printmakers, and in 1960 was elected a member of the Royal Institute of Oil Painters.

Following Embleton's death at age 57, his obituary in The Times described him as "responsible for some of the finest full-colour adventure series in modern British comics ... a grandmaster of his art." David Ashford and Norman Wright, writing in Book and Magazine Collector (March 2002), note that "his work for such diverse periodicals as Express Weekly, TV Century 21, Princess, Boys' World, and Look and Learn have earned him the respect of every practitioner in the field and the gratitude of all of us who admire the art of the comic strip."

His younger brother is fellow illustrator and comics artist Gerry Embleton.

== Biography ==
=== Early life and education ===
Embleton (who, in his early career, simply signed his work "Ron") was born in London and submitted his first cartoon at the age of nine and, aged 12, won a national poster competition. He trained at the South East Essex Technical College and School of Art, where his tutors included David Bomberg, who would prove a great influence on Embleton's subsequent work as a painter of both figures and landscapes.

=== Early career ===
On the completion of his training he worked in a commercial studio for six months, during which time he began freelancing comic strips to independent publishers. "Ron" was beginning to establish himself when Embleton turned 18 and was called up for his National Service, during which time he served in south-east Asia during the Malayan Emergency.

In 1950, Embleton returned to freelancing, setting up a studio with a schoolfriend, Terry Patrick, and James Bleach, whom Patrick knew from life-drawing classes. The three quickly established themselves with various independent publishers — Scion, TV Boardman, Norman Light, DCMT and others — and Embleton also began contributing to Amalgamated Press's Comet, Comic Cuts, Cowboy Comics, and Super Detective Library.

=== Children's comics ===
Embleton's finest work during this period was for Mickey Mouse Weekly where he drew Rogers' Rangers (1953), Strongbow the Mighty (1954–1957) and Don o' the Drums (1957), and Express Weekly, where he took over the artwork (and subsequently the scripting) of Wulf the Briton. It was on the latter that he developed his techniques for working in colour, creating over 300 pages of meticulously painted artwork during his four-year run on the strip (1956–1960).

His fascination with historical characters and settings served him well with later strips, Wrath of the Gods (Boys' World, 1963) and 'Johnny Frog' (Eagle, 1964), although Embleton was equally at home with contemporary adventure strips (Biggles, TV Express, 1960) and science fiction: his artwork for Stingray in TV Century 21 led to the show's creator, Gerry Anderson, inviting Embleton to provide artwork to grace the closing credits of his new show, Captain Scarlet and the Mysterons. His ten paintings depicted Captain Scarlet in various states of peril and appeared under the closing credits at the end of every episode. After shooting they were stored in producer Reg Hill's safe where they remained in perfect condition for more than thirty years. In 2003, all ten works were sold by Reg Hill's estate at Christie's auction house in South Kensington, fetching between £2,500 and £3,500 each. Shortly afterward, publisher Iconagraph produced limited-edition versions of the art, each signed by Francis Matthews, the voice of Captain Scarlet.

In the 1960s, Embleton was also a prolific contributor to Look and Learn, producing illustrations for numerous series, including The Bath Road (1962), Pioneers Across the Atlantic (1962), The Travels of Marco Polo (1964), Men of the Jolly Roger (1965), Rogers' Rangers (1970) and Legends of the Rhineland (1972–73) amongst others.

In 1969, Embleton illustrated a fill-in story in the long-running Trigan Empire strip. During this period, Embleton also provided illustrations for titles aimed at younger children, amongst them Playhour, Once Upon a Time, The Storyteller, and numerous books.

In 1971, he became a frequent contributor to IPC's World of Wonder magazine, a similar publication to Look and Learn which also relied on painted illustrations by a roster of British artists. Embleton provided artwork for long-running features such as Men of Waterloo (1971), Ships of the Seven Seas (1971), The Winning of the West (1972) and Mutiny! (1972), as well as contributing a number of cover paintings (issues 118, 124 and 131).

Late in 1973, he returned to World of Wonder to illustrate an adaptation of Lewis Carroll's Alice's Adventures in Wonderland. It was the increasing demand for his comic work that led Embleton to largely cease exhibiting his oil paintings at around this time.

=== Later work ===
During the late 1970s, Embleton was commissioned by This England magazine to draw what became a total of forty-three characters from Dickens and the Classics which were published quarterly throughout the 1980s. All these coloured illustrations in large A2 format are now in private ownership.

As well as providing illustrations for historical books and prints, Embleton spent much of the remainder of his career illustrating full-colour comic strips for Penthouse. Oh, Wicked Wanda! (1973–1980) was written by British author Frederic Mullally and poked fun at politics and sexual mores; it was followed by Sweet Chastity, written by Penthouse founder Bob Guccione.

== Death ==
Embleton died of a heart attack at his home in Bournemouth on 13 February 1988, aged 57. As well as The Times, obituaries appeared in a number of other national newspapers, including The Daily Telegraph and The Independent, the latter noting that whilst Embleton was "internationally famous"' for his Penthouse comic strip, "he was also a fine illustrator whose penchant for historical accuracy and detail went beyond mere craft". In The Guardian he was lauded as "a comic strip artist of extraordinary energy and versatility, so wide-ranging in what he did that he might seem on the face of it to have straddled the void —or pit — which [George] Orwell saw gaping between the "gentle" English tales and the sadomasochistic "Yank mags" in the famous essay on Boys' Weeklies."

== Bibliography ==
=== Written and illustrated ===
- Pioneers and Heroes of the Wild West, by Embleton (London, Purnell, 1969 ISBN 0-361-01208-X)

=== Illustrated ===
- The Adventures of Robin Hood Annual 2–4, nn, by Arthur Groom (London, Adprint, 1957–60)
- King Arthur and His Knights (London, Spring Books, 1957?)
- Davy Crockett Painting Book (London, Birn Bros, 1957?)
- The First Book of Heroes, by David Thornycroft (London, Dean, 1958)
- The Adventures of Sir Lancelot 2 (London, Adprint, 1958)
- Hawkeye and the Last of the Mohicans, by David Roberts (London, Adprint, 1959)
- R.C.M.P. Annual, by Graham Anderson (London, Purnell, 1961)
- Robin Hood Painting Book (London, Purnell, 1961)
- Great Spy Stories, ed. Virginia Shankland (London, Purnell, 1966)
- The Valiant Book of Pirates (London, Fleetway, 1967)
- The Finding Out Book of Battles, by George Surtees (London, Purnell, 1968)
- Slumber Tales, retold by Shirley Dean (Young World, 1968)
- The Land of Tales, retold by Edward Holmes (North Cheam, Young World, 1969 ISBN 0-7238-0602-0)
- The Nightingale Book of Fairy Tales, retold by Shirley Dean (London, Young World, 1969)
- Time for Tales, retold by Phylis Brown (North Cheam, Young World, 1969 ISBN 0-7238-0605-5)
- The Story of Newspapers, by W. D. Siddle (Loughborough, Wills & Hepworth Ladybird Books, 1969)
- Once Upon Another Time, being the latest adventures of your best loved fairytale folk, by Anne Webb (Sutton, Young World, 1970 ISBN 0-7238-0656-X)
- Know About Dogs, by Edward Holmes (North Cheam, Young World, 1970 ISBN 0-7238-0664-0)
- Know About the World by Edward Holmes (North Cheam, Young World, 1971 ISBN 0-7238-0703-5)
- Aladdin, and other fairy stories, by Anne Webb (London, Young World, 1971 ISBN 0-7238-0710-8)
- Jack and the Beanstalk, and other fairy stories, by Anne Webb (London, Young World, 1971 ISBN 0-7238-0711-6)
- Sleeping Beauty, and other fairy tales, by Anne Webb (London, Young World, 1971 ISBN 0-7238-0712-4)
- Snow White, and other fairy tales, by Anne Webb (London, Young World, 1971 ISBN 0-7238-0713-2)
- The Ghost of Crumbling Castle, by Jane MacMichael (London, Blackie, 1972 ISBN 0-216-89533-2)
- My Rhyme Book of Fairytale Land (Sutton, Young World, 1972 ISBN 0-7238-0851-1)
- Birds of the Farne Islands, by Peter Hawkey (Newcastle upon Tyne, F. Graham, 1973 ISBN 0-902833-79-0)
- The Frog Prince and five other traditional tales, retold by Jane MacMichael (Glasgow, Blackie, 1973 ISBN 0-216-89623-1)
- Puss in Boots [and] Tom Thumb (London, Collins, 1973 ISBN 0-00-120469-6)
- Snow-White and the Seven Dwarfs, retold by Christian Willcox (Glasgow, Blackie, 1973 ISBN 0-216-89559-6). Pop-up book with models designed by Brian Edwards
- The Roman Wall Reconstructed, by Charles Daniels (Newscastle upon Tyne, F. Graham, 1974 ISBN 0-85983-056-X)
- Geordie Pride, by Frank Graham & Sid Chaplin (Newcastle upon Tyne, F. Graham, 1974 ISBN 0-85983-061-6)
- Historical Northumberland, by Frank Graham (Newcastle upon Tyne, 1975 ISBN 0-902833-42-1)
- Holy Island, by Frank Graham (Newcastle upon Tyne, F. Graham, 1975 ISBN 0-85983-033-0)
- What the Soldiers Wore on Hadrian's Wall, by H. Russell Robinson (Newcastle upon Tyne, F. Graham, 1976 ISBN 0-85983-093-4)
- Hansel and Gretel and The Frog Prince (London, Collins, 1978 ISBN 0-00-120467-X)
- Cinderella and The Sleeping Beauty (London, Collins, 1978 ISBN 0-00-120468-8)
- Snow White and Little Red Riding Hood (London, Collins, 1978 ISBN 0-00-120470-X)
- Housesteads in the Days of the Romans, by Frank Graham (Newcastle upon Tyne, F. Graham, 1978 ISBN 0-85983-116-7)
- Chesters and Carrawburgh in the Days of the Romans, by Frank Graham (Newcastle unpon Tyne, F. Graham, 1979 ISBN 0-85983-120-5)
- Legions of the North, by Michael Simkins (Oxford, Osprey, 1979 ISBN 1-84176-129-X)
- The Purnell Book of Famous Fairy Tales, by Barbara Hayes (Maidenhead, Purnell, 1979 ISBN 0-361-04413-5)
- The Roman Army from Hadrian to Constantine, by Michael Simkins (Oxford, Osprey, 1979 ISBN 0-85045-333-X)
- The Armour of the Roman Legions, by H. Russell Robinson (Newcastle upon Tyne, F. Graham, 1980 ISBN 0-85983-151-5)
- The Conquest of Mexico to the Great Fire of London (Basingstoke, Macmillan Children's Books, 1980 ISBN 0-333-28424-0). Series of wallcharts illustrated by Embleton, Angus McBride and Kenneth Lowther
- South Shields, Wallsend, Newcastle and Benwell in the Days of the Romans, by Frank Graham (Newcastle upon Tyne, F. Graham, 1980 ISBN 0-85983-156-6)
- Dean's Enchanting Stories from the Magic Castle (London, Dean, 1981 ISBN 0-603-00248-X). Jointly illustrated by Gill Embleton
- Roman Cook Book (Newcastle upon Tyne, F. Graham, 1981 ISBN 0-85983-127-2). Jointly illustrated by Gill Embleton
- The Stanegate, Corbridge, Vindolanda and Carvoran in the Days of the Romans, by Frank Graham (Newcastle upon Tyne, F. Graham, 1981 ISBN 0-85983-181-7)
- Birdoswald, Bewcastle and Castleheads in the Days of the Romans, by Frank Graham (Newcastle upon Tyne, F. Graham, 1982 ISBN 0-85983-137-X)
- Benwell to Chester in the Days of the Romans, by Frank Graham (Newcastle upon Tyne, F. Graham, 1982 ISBN 0-85983-147-7)
- Best Known Fairy Stories, by Charles Perrault, retold by Lornie Leete-Hodge (London, Dean, 1983 ISBN 0-600-37814-4)
- Children's Favourite Stories, by Hans Christian Andersen, retold by Lornie Leete-Hodge (London, Dean, 1983 ISBN 0-600-37815-2)
- Best Children's Stories, by the Brothers Grimm, retold by Lornie Leete-Hodge (London, Dean, 1983 ISBN 0-600-37816-0)
- The Best Traditional Fairy Stories, retold by Lornie Leete-Hodge (London, Dean, 1983 ISBN 0-600-37817-9)
- Hadrian's Wall in the Days of the Romans, by Frank Graham (Newcastle upon Tyne, F. Graham, 1984 ISBN 0-85983-177-9)
- Aesop's Fables, retold by Lornie Leete-Hodge (London, Dean, 1985 ISBN 0-603-00425-3)
- Kenneth Grahame's The Wind in the Willows, retold by Lornie Leete-Hodge (London, Dean, 1985 ISBN 0-603-00427-X)
- Oscar Wilde's The Happy Prince, retold by Lornie Leete-Hodge (London, Dean, 1986 ISBN 0-603-00424-5)
- Sinbad the Sailor, retold by Lornie Leete-Hodge (London, Dean, 1986 ISBN 0-603-00426-1)
- Finding Out with Terry and Son, by Conrad Frost (London, Express Newspapers, 1987 ISBN 0-85079-158-8)
- Hadrian's Wall Reconstructed (Butler, 1987 ISBN 0-946928-14-2)
- Caesar's Legions. The Roman soldier 753BC to 117AD, by Nicholas V. Sekunda et al. (Oxford, Osprey, 2000 ISBN 1-84176-044-7). Illustrated by Embleton, Richard Hook and Angus McBride. Based on previously published titles Early Roman Armies, Republican Roman Army 200-104BC and The Roman Army from Caesar to Trajan
