= Polystyle Publications =

- Status: Dissolved (1997)
- Predecessor: TV Publications
- Founded: 12 May 1960
- Country of origin: United Kingdom
- Headquarters location: Paddington Green; London, W2
- Distribution: International
- Publication types: Children's comics and books
- Nonfiction topics: Comics based on television shows

Polystyle Publications Ltd was a British publisher of children's comics and books that operated from 1960 to 1997, publishing such titles as TV Comic, I-Spy, Pippin, Countdown/TV Action, and BEEB.

The company's registered offices were at Polly Perkins House, Paddington Green, 382/386 Edgware Road, London W2. Its publications were distributed in the United Kingdom by The Argus Press Ltd of 12/18 Paul Street, London EC2. Overseas, Polystyle's publications were distributed by its sole agents: for Australia and New Zealand, Messrs Gordon & Gotch (Asia) Ltd; for South Africa, the Central News Agency Ltd.

== History ==
The company was incorporated as TV Publications on 12 May 1960, ostensibly to publish TV Comic, which it had acquired from Beaverbrook Newspapers.

The company changed its name to Polystyle Publications Ltd in March 1968. It dissolved in 1997 due to insolvency.

== Reputation & Legacy ==
Polystyle Comics particularly those of more popular franchises like Doctor Who as originally published in TV Comic and Countdown/TV Action were reprinted by Marvel starting in the 1990s.

The quality of material compared with other 60s comics like TV21 gained the company a reputation for low-quality, cheap content, much of which often bared little resemblance to the source material.

== Titles ==
Among the titles that it published were:

- BEEB (1985)
- Buttons for Play School Children (1981–90)
- Countdown/TV Action (1971–73)
- I-Spy (c. 1967–c. 1982)
- Pippin (1966–1986)
- Playland (1968–1975)
- Read To Me (1977)
- Target (1978)
- TV Comic (1960–1984; originated in 1951, previously published by News of the World then Beaverbrook)
  - TV Comic Annual (1960–1985)
  - TV Comic Holiday Special (23 issues, 1962–1985)
