= Bulldagger =

Bulldagger may refer to:

- A slang term used for a lesbian; see Dyke (slang).
- The Bulldaggers, a fictional rock band in Matt Howarth's comics.
