= Vortex Comics =

Canadian independent comic book publisher

- Industry: Comics
- Founded: 1982
- Founder: Bill Marks
- Headquarters: Toronto, Ontario, Canada

Vortex Comics is a Canadian independent comic book publisher that began operation in 1982. Under the supervision of president, publisher, and editor Bill Marks, Vortex was known for such titles as Dean Motter's Mister X, Howard Chaykin's Black Kiss, and Chester Brown's Yummy Fur, the last of which was a pioneer of alternative comics. Vortex also earned a reputation for publishing Canadian comic book creators such as Brown, Ty Templeton, Ken Steacy, and Jeffrey Morgan.

== History ==
Vortex was founded by 20-year-old high school dropout William P. "Bill" Marks of Toronto in 1982, with its first title being an anthology comic of the same name. Marks recalled, "[Comic books] had a lot of potential for growth that I could see. I could see a revolution happening. By this time Cerebus was doing extremely well. Elfquest was a runaway success in the bookstores and on the best-seller lists. Eclipse was starting up and shortly thereafter Pacific Comics started to get quite big." Vortex received good distribution in both the U.S. and Canada. The company proved to be a major force in Canadian comics publishing throughout the 1980s.

Vortex president Bill Marks in a 1986 promo photo.

Early issues of Vortex were edited by Marks himself (who later described them as "quite primitive") and received limited exposure. In 1983 Vortex redesigned their approach, employed Ken Steacy as editor, and added new titles like Mister X and Templeton's Stig's Inferno, as well as Templeton & Klaus Schoenefeld's Kelvin Mace and Matt Howarth's Those Annoying Post Bros. The first four issues of Mister X featured work by the Los Bros Jaime and Gilbert Hernandez.

In 1986–1987, Vortex again expanded, adding titles such as Ted McKeever's Transit, Bill White's Kaptain Keen & Kompany, Howarth's Savage Henry, and the two-issue Peter Milligan series Paradax. More significantly, Vortex began publishing a full-sized version of Chester Brown's mini-comic Yummy Fur, bringing Brown's surreal, black-humor stories to a wider audience. In 1990, Yummy Fur was nominated for a Harvey Award (Special Award for Humor category). Around this time Vortex also began publishing book-length graphic novels and compilations.

However, hard times hit the comics industry in 1988, and Vortex, like many other small publishers, suffered. The company launched a few new titles in 1988, most notably Howard Chaykin's erotic thriller Black Kiss. Black Kiss became one of the most controversial North American comics of the late 1980s, due to the comic having the sort of explicit scenes of sex and violence unseen in most comics published at the time. In addition, Vortex's printer at the time, Ronald's Printing, refused to print the book due to its content. To help retailers who had worries over selling what could be described as pornography, Vortex released the series sealed in a plastic bag. (This meant that casual browsers could not open the comic, or obviously see the internal content.) The publicity over Black Kiss didn't necessarily lead to strong sales, however, and by the end of 1988 Vortex's publishing schedule was erratic. Nonetheless, in January 1989, Vortex declared itself the third largest North American independent comic book publisher.

Reflecting publisher Marks' interest in car racing, Vortex survived until 1994 with an odd mixture of alternative titles and NASCAR-themed comics. (In 1991 and 1992 Vortex sponsored the 'Rookie of the Year' award in NASCAR's Grand National series; the 1991 prize was won by future superstar Jeff Gordon.)

In May 1994 Matt Howarth officially moved Those Annoying Post Bros. to rival publisher Aeon. Shakeups in the comics industry that year hit the small press hard, and Vortex was no exception. The last comic published by the company was Nocturnal Emissions #4, in March 1994, until a resurgence in 2021 with the titles Chaos Breaker and Queen of Skulls.

=== Vortex Words + Pictures ===
After a brief career as a race car driver, publisher Marks went on to produce and direct numerous feature films. In 2009, Marx re-branded Vortex Vortex Words + Pictures, and Marks subsequently produced the George Hickenlooper film Casino Jack (2010), starring Kevin Spacey; A Dark Truth (2012) with Andy Garcia and Forest Whitaker; Compulsion (2013), starring Heather Graham (with cinematography by the legendary Vilmos Zsigmond); as well as the sitcom Trailer Park Boys and the indy hit WolfCop (2014).

== Titles published ==
=== Ongoing titles ===
- Big Black Kiss (1989–1990)
- Black Kiss (1988–1989)
- Bloodlines #4–7 (1987–1988)
- Doc Chaos: The Strange Attractor (1990–1992)
- Kaptain Keen and Company (1987)
- Kelvin Mace (1985–1986)
- Ken Steacy's Summer Rerun (1987)
- The Legends of NASCAR (1990–1992)
- Mister X (3 series, 1984–1992)
- NASCAR Adventures (1991–1992)
- Nocturnal Emissions (1991–1994)
- Paradax (1987)
- Savage Henry (1987–1990)
- S'not for Kids (1991)
- Stig's Inferno (1985–1986)
- Those Annoying Post Bros. (1985–1991) — acquired by Rip Off Press
- Transit (1987)
- Vortex Comics (1982–1988)
- Yummy Fur (1986–1991)
- Chaos Breaker (2021)
- Queen of Skulls (2021)

=== Specials and one-shots ===
- Badlands (6-issue limited series, cancelled after first issue then moved to Dark Horse Comics, 1990)
- Brain of Mister X (1988)
- Daytona Special (1991)
- Ed the Happy Clown (two one-shots, 1989 & 1992)
- The Legends of NASCAR Christmas Special (1991)
- Mister X Special (1990)
- The Return of Mister X (1986)
- Thick Black Kiss (1993)

== Creators associated with Vortex Comics ==
- Chester Brown
- Howard Chaykin
- Gilbert Hernandez
- Jaime Hernandez
- Mario Hernandez
- Matt Howarth
- Diti Katona
- Ted McKeever
- Peter Milligan
- Jeffrey Morgan
- Dean Motter
- Seth
- Bil Simser (original logos)
- Fiona Smyth
- Ty Templeton
- Dave Thorpe
- Mike Dringenberg
