= Black Kiss =

Comic book series by Howard Chaykin

- 2010 hardcover cover

Publication information
- Publisher: Vortex Comics
- Schedule: Monthly
- Format: Limited series
- Genre: Crime, erotic; Vampire
- Publication date: June 1988 – July 1989
- No. of issues: 12
- Main character(s): Dagmar Laine; Beverly Grove; Cass Pollack

Creative team
- Created by: Howard Chaykin
- Written by: Howard Chaykin
- Artist: Howard Chaykin
- Letterer: Ken Bruzenak
- Editor: Lou Stathis

Black Kiss is a twelve-issue hardboiled erotic American comic book limited series written and drawn by Howard Chaykin, which was originally published in 1988 by Vortex Comics.

The series' explicit sex scenes and the inclusion of transsexual femme fatale Dagmar Laine saw Black Kiss labelled among the most controversial comic series of the late 1980s. A sequel series, Black Kiss 2, followed in 2012.

== Creation ==
Writer-artist Howard Chaykin had already carved out a reputation as an acclaimed but controversial creator with the independent series American Flagg! and his violent reboots of The Shadow and Blackhawk for DC Comics before he began pitching Black Kiss. His decision to write the book was influenced by DC's ill-fated attempt to introduce an internal ratings system for its comics.

Chaykin wrote a four-page outline for the story some years before under the working title Smoke Dreams, expanding it to full script in 1987 after leaving DC. He labelled the series as an "erotic horror" and noted that this put several publishers off producing it, going with Bill Marks' Canadian company Vortex Comics when he didn't balk at the contents.

Chaykin told Amazing Heroes: -

"Black Kiss is about blackmail and pornography and making fun of people and public humiliation and people caught up in situations they can't do anything about... and the importance of wearing the right outfit for the right social occasion."

Despite this he felt there were elements of comedy in the storyline. Later, he described his thinking behind tackling such controversial topics: -

"The book was done at a time when there was serious talk about trying to create a rating's system for comics, and the idea was that I would do a book that would be appalling and offensive...and funny."

Chaykin would later acknowledge the films of Alfred Hitchcock, the novels of Alan Furst and Raymond Chandler and his own experiences living in Los Angeles as influences on Black Kiss. He also claimed Dagmar was partly inspired by "Puerto Rican drag queens" he had worked alongside at an art studio, and an encounter with a "transvestite doppelganger" of a previous girlfriend on Madison Avenue, while much of the architecture was based on real properties in California - particularly Glendale, while sex scenes were modelled on stills from Adult Video Review.

== Publication history ==
Ahead of the release of the first issue, Marks described the series as "100% unrestricted Howard Chaykin", with Chaykin himself noting Black Kiss would "offend just about everyone who reads it". The series was split into 10-page chapters, published in a 16-page monthly comic., priced at $1.25 per issue - a high price at the time, particularly for issues of such short length. The story was in black-and-white, which Chaykin felt was necessary for it to work. To help retailers who had worries over selling what could be described as pornography, Vortex released the series sealed in a plastic bag. This meant that casual browsers could not open the comic, or obviously see the internal content; inside the bag the book featured additional black card sleeves to hide the covers. The book's sexually explicit content led to Vortex's regular printer refusing to handle the series from the fifth issue onwards.

Partway through the series' initial publication, Chaykin told Heidi MacDonald he was pleased with the strong initial reaction to the book, and felt that it got doing a sexually orientated book "got it out of my system", taking a shot at his peers by noting "I have more than one idea". He called it "the most vilified comic book in the country right now" but defended the book's salacious nature by noting that if readers "can find anything to jerk off to in that book, I'm astounded.". Chaykin also claimed he had received further offers to work on other erotic comics, which he dismissed because he was "tired of reading sex stuff by guys who have never had a date". Vortex reported the title was selling around 50,000 copies an issue; Marks claimed this made it the third-best selling independent title on the market (behind Mirage Studios' Teenage Mutant Ninja Turtles and Dark Horse Comics' Aliens), though as The Comics Journal pointed out this was due to Marks using his own definition of 'independent' that conflicted with that used by most others in the industry.

Following the conclusion of the series' initial publication in 1989, Vortex repackaged it as a three-part mini-series called Big Black Kiss, reprinting four chapters a time in a 48-page, $3.25 format. The series did attract legal attention. In 1989, customs officers in New Zealand seized imported copies of Big Black Kiss on grounds of indecency; at the time law in the country regarded all comics as children's literature and made no account of material intended for adult readers. Following a raid on London comic store Edge of Forever saw several titles seized under the Obscene Publications Act 1964, British police identified Black Kiss as "unacceptable in any format".

The series was collected into trade paperback format several times, including Thick Black Kiss from Vortex in 1993 (ISBN 0921451067) with an introduction by Sam Hamm and a 2002 edition released by Eros Comix (ISBN 1560973803). In 2010, it was collected again by Dynamite Entertainment. Interviewed around the release of the Dynamite edition, Chaykin noted that the book's various reprintings had made it one of his most profitable works.

=== Translations ===
Black Kiss was also translated into several languages - a German edition was published by Austrian publisher Comicothek, including a three-part softcover edition in 1992 as well as a limited hardcover collection in the mid-1990s; a hardcover collection from Norma Editorial in Spanish in 2003; a softcover translated into French in 2010 by Delcourt; as a trade paperback and a hardcover collection by Devir in Portuguese in 2011; and as a trade paperback by Planeta Komiksów in Polish in 2016.

== Plot synopsis ==
The series is set in Los Angeles in the 1980s and opens with Dagmar Laine, a transsexual prostitute and lover to former 1950s film star Beverly Grove, searching for a reel of film taken from the Vatican's collection of pornography. The reel has been sent to Father Frank Murtaugh by his brother who is a Cardinal in the Vatican. Laine tries to grab the reel from Father Murtaugh but the reel is stolen by a nun.

Laine and Grove then get Cass Pollack, a jazz musician and ex-heroin addict who is on the run from the Mafia, to steal the reel in return for them providing Pollack with an alibi. Pollack is also on the run from the police, due to the Mafia killing Pollack's wife and daughter and Pollack being the only suspect.

Laine and Grove (who look virtually identical) provide Pollack with a lead as to where the reel is after the death of Father Murtaugh. This takes Pollack first of all to an occult bookshop called "The Oath of Incannabulata" where he steals a copy of a book about the mysterious "Order of Bonniface". After the bookshop he ends up in a funeral home called "Tanas" where he finds a number of celebrities indulging in bizarre rituals.

Going through Murtaugh's possessions, Pollack finds an invitation to the next meeting of the "Order of Bonniface". He attends this and discovers the Order was formed at the beginning of Hollywood's movie era and that they worship Charles 'Bubba' Kenton, a 1920s film star who was also married to Beverly Grove. He discovers that Kenton forced Grove to give their daughter Sophie up shortly before Kenton became a vampire. After becoming a vampire Kenton forms The Order of Bonniface and turns many of his followers into vampires, including Beverly Grove. This gives Grove the chance of revenge over the loss of her daughter and she switches Kenton's alarm clock so that he wakes during the day and dies in the sunlight.

However The Order want the reel of film as it shows Beverly Grove and Bubba Kenton together in a pornographic film which shows that Grove is much older than she claims to be to the world. They hope she can turn them into vampires and therefore give them eternal youth.

However one of The Order, a young woman called Magda, wants Grove to only make her a vampire. This is because she is Grove's granddaughter, in addition to the nun who stole the reel from Father Murtaugh earlier in the story. Pollack becomes caught in the middle as everyone around him attempts to win, leaving Pollack in a position where he seems unable to survive.

== Reception ==
Reviewing the first three issues for Amazing Heroes, Donald K. Niven had mixed feelings. While he praised some of Black Kiss' storytelling techniques and uniqueness, Niven felt that too much of the series was shaped by a desire to shock, and concluded that readers were "more mature than Chaykin pretends to be.". He also felt Chaykin's art made it difficult to see that Bev and Dagmar were intended to look identical. Rob Rodi of The Comics Journal was impressed by the book's "chutzpah", noting "It's so arrogant it's funny; you laugh out loud" but found the series wearying as it went on. Darcy Sullivan was also unmoved in a later issue, feeling Chaykin played Black Kiss "for giggles, hanging a soupcon of stylistic tricks on the most contrived of plots, and seems most interested in referencing low artforms: hard-boiled pulp fiction, porn films, vampire comics.". Comics writer Grant Morrison has described Black Kiss as "adolescent homophobic mummy's boy jerk-off fantasy drivel." In response, Chaykin would accuse Morrison of "utterly humourless self-regard". Chaykin's portrayal of transgender characters, including Dagmar, has been criticised as transphobic.

Matt Fraction would later praise the series, seeing it as a logically absurd extension of "exploiting all of the totemic sex fetishes the comics world had loved him for to date: big asses and hiked-up skirts; garters and blow jobs", describing Black Kiss as "poisonous and bitter, an absurdly funny sucker punch demanding to be spat out." Reviewing the 2010 collected edition for Slings & Arrows, Frank Plowright felt the series would never achieve its deserved acclaim due to its sexual content, feeling that behind this there "is a well-thought out plot that swerves away from expectation and contains some great sequences". Lars Ingebrigsten was less effuse, feeling Chaykin's flashy storytelling was used to compensate for a weak plot.

== Film adaptation ==
From the start, Chaykin hoped to get Black Kiss made as a film parallel to the comic's publications, initially getting some involvement from an independent producer; he would humorously note that this wasn't to be a pornographic production, but R-rated. He wanted to cast Ray Sharkey as Cass but felt it would be difficult to find a transsexual to play Dagmar who would look convincingly close to Bev. Had money not been an object, Chaykin stated he would want Kim Basinger to play both roles. However, the project would not come to fruition.

== Sequel ==
Chaykin produced a sequel, Black Kiss 2, in 2012 for Image Comics.
