= MU Press =

Defunct US independent comic book publisher

- Parent company: MU Publications
- Status: defunct: 2006
- Founded: 1990
- Founder: Edd Vick
- Country of origin: United States of America
- Headquarters location: Seattle, Washington
- Key people: Chuck Melville
- Publication types: Comic books
- Fiction genres: Furry, Alternative, Erotic
- Imprints: Aeon Publications
- Official website: mupress.com

MU Press (officially Miscellanea Unlimited Press) was an independent comic book publisher based in Seattle, Washington, which operated from 1990 until c. 2006. MU Press was one of the industry's most prolific "furry" comic publishers, while its mid-1990s imprint Aeon Publications specialized in alternative fare. MU Press was founded by writer/editor Edd Vick. Notable creators associated with MU/Aeon included Donna Barr, Ed Brubaker, Matt Howarth, Milton Knight, David Lasky, Colin Upton, Taral Wayne and Nicola Cuti.

== History ==
MU's early series included Donna Barr's Desert Peach and Dwight R. Decker & Teri S. Wood's Rhudiprrt, Prince of Fur. Cathy Hill's Mad Raccoons debuted in 1991, running until 1997. In 1992, MU published the first issue of the erotic furry anthology Wild Kingdom (which later changed its title to Wild!). MU published 31 total issues of Wild Kingdom/Wild! 1992–2005.

MU's Aeon Publications imprint operated 1994–1998, publishing a wide variety of alternative titles. Aeon acquired Matt Howarth's Those Annoying Post Bros. from Rip Off Press in 1994, publishing that title until 1998. Other notable Aeon series included David Lasky's Boom Boom and Ed Brubaker's Lowlife.

The monthly all-genre anthology ZU ran 19 issues 1995–1996; Colin Upton's limited series Buddha on the Road ran 1996–1998.

In August 1997, publisher Vick announced that both MU Press and Aeon were suspending publishing. It turned out only Aeon wound down; MU continued publishing sporadically for nearly ten more years.

From 2004 to 2006, MU/Aeon published a number of Matt Howarth graphic novels, comics, and limited series, including Savage Henry: Powerchords, Savage Henry: Puppet Trap, the 6-issue series Bugtown, Anubis Horn, and Keif Llama: Xeno-Tech (a title which originated with Fantagraphics in 1988–1989).

In September 2005, MU Press announced on a furry fandom message board that it was canceling Wild! due to low sales; they continued publishing trade paperback collections of some of their previous titles and completed the runs of some of Howarth's titles.

== Titles published (selected) ==
- Buddha on the Road (6 issues, 1996–1998) — Colin Upton
- Bugtown (6 issues, 2004–2005) — Matt Howarth
- The Desert Peach (22 issues and numerous one-shots, 1990–1996) — Donna Barr
- Keif Llama: Xeno-Tech (6 issues, 2005–2006) — Matt Howarth
- Lowlife (3 issues, 1994–1995) — Ed Brubaker
- Mad Raccoons (7 issues, 1991–1997) — Cathy Hill
- On Our Butts (1994) — all-female anthology edited by Gabrielle Gamboa with Fawn Gehweiler
- Rhudiprrt, Prince of Fur (12 issues, 1990–2004) — Dwight R. Decker and various artists
- Those Annoying Post Bros. (25 issues, 1994–1998) — Matt Howarth; acquired from Rip Off Press
- Wild Kingdom / Wild! (31 total issues, 1992–2005)
- ZU (19 issues, 1995–1996)
