= Stinz =

Comic book

Stinz is a comic book created by Donna Barr, chronicling the adventures of Steinheld Löwhard, or "Stinz"---a half-horse (centaurs are barbarians) who lives with other centaurs and "two-leggers" in an imaginary Alpine valley called the Gieselthal.

The society of the Gieselthal is very reminiscent of pre-World War I Germany, and the people speak a German sounding dialect invented by Barr herself. The Gieselthal centaurs call themselves halbpferd ("halfhorses") and look down on the nomadic "gypsy centaurs" who come through their valley at intervals. While relations between centaurs and "two-leggers" are usually cordial, there is normally some distance---centaurs see "two-leggers" as weak and fragile.

Stinz Löwhard is, uniquely among his people, a veteran of the military, having attained the rank of Major, and war-hero status, in the last war fought in his world. He was greatly changed by his eight years' military service, and often feels rather alienated from his neighbors and family on account of it. Even so, he is a loving, faithful husband and tries to be the best father he knows how to be. He is quite wealthy, by the standards of his home, and holds the titles of "Räth" (council member) and Mayor at various times.

The Stinz stories cover his life through his mischievous youth, up through his stormy courtship of his neighbor's daughter Brüna, his induction into the military, some of his war exploits, and his life after his return home.

Barr had recently published the 1981 novel in which Stinz (in very different form) first appeared, under the title An Insupportable Light.

== Bibliography ==
- 1989: Stinz #1-4 (publisher Fantagraphics, 1989 August - 1990 February)
- 1990:
  - Stinz #5 (publisher Brave New Words, 1990 June)
  - Stinz: Horsebrush and Other Tales (publisher Eclipse Comics, 1990 November)
- 1991: Stinz #1-#3 (publisher Brave New Words, 1991 January - July)
- 1992: Stinz: Wartime and Wedding Bells (publisher Brave New Words, 1992 January), reprints from Stinz (Fantagraphics, 1989) and Stinz (Brave New Words, 1990).
- MU Press:
  - Stinz: Warhorse, 1993, reprints from Stinz (Brave New Words, 1991 series).
  - Stinz: Family Values (one-shot), 1994 October.
  - Stinz: Old Man Out (one-shot), 1994 October.
  - Stinz: The Bobwar (one-shot), 1995 February.
  - Stinz: Bum Steer (one-shot), October 1995.
  - Stinz: A Stranger to Our Kind (one-shot), 1997 January.
- Elmsfire Books
  - Stinz #1-2 (1998-1999), German-language translation.
- A Fine Line Press (Donna Barr self-publishing):
  - Stinz #6-#9, 1998 June - 2006 May. Numbering as though the MU Press Stinz one-shots were #1-5.
  - Stinz: Charger -- the War Stories, 1999 April. Reprints from Stinz (Fantagraphics, 1989), Stinz (Brave New Words, 1990) and Stinz (Brave New Words, 1991)
  - split-book Stinz: The Big Book -- New Souls /Bosom Enemies #3, 2004 March.
