= Shattered Visage =

Comic book mini-series by Dean Motter

The Prisoner: Shattered Visage
- The Prisoner: Shattered Visage collected edition.
- Author: Dean Motter and Mark Askwith
- Illustrator: Dean Motter
- Language: English
- Genre: Tie-in
- Publisher: DC Comics
- Publication date: 1988–1989 (individual issues) 1990 (collected edition)
- Media type: Print (paperback)
- Pages: 208
- ISBN: 978-0-930289-53-9
- OCLC: 26969478

The Prisoner: Shattered Visage is a four-issue comic book mini-series published by DC Comics in 1988–1989, based on The Prisoner, the 1967 television series created by and starring Patrick McGoohan. The name is a reference to Percy Shelley's sonnet Ozymandias, which forms part of the introduction.

The series was illustrated by Mister X creator Dean Motter and co-written with Mark Askwith. It was later collected as a 208-page trade paperback, with the addition of a new prologue.

== Overview ==
Set twenty years after the final episode of the television series, Shattered Visage follows former secret agent Alice Drake as she is shipwrecked on the shores of the Village and encounters an aged Number Six. While the decades-old conflict unfolds between Six and Number Two (as played by Leo McKern in the TV series), secret agents in London have their own plans regarding the intelligence mine that is The Village, as well as the secret lying at its very core. The trade paperback included a two-page text piece that explained the surreal final episode, "Fall Out", as drug-induced hallucination.

The likenesses of McGoohan and Leo McKern were featured for their characters’ returns. ITC Entertainment subjected the comic to a thorough evaluation. The contract required that each page of art and each complete issue be sent to the notoriously critical series creator, Patrick McGoohan, for his signed approval. McGoohan signed off on the material without comment and ITC later informed Motter, "He didn't hate it." McKern sent Motter a note saying he was flattered to be a "comic book villain" for the first time.

== Plot synopsis ==
Former secret agent Alice Drake, now an adventurer, prepares to embark upon a round-the-world sailing expedition. Her daughter, Meagan, is left in the care of her estranged husband Thomas, a secret service officer. Thomas is conducting research on the Village, a retirement facility for British spies that, in 1967, became focused on interrogating Number Six to determine the extent of his secret information and intent. Their final, unsuccessful effort was a surreal, drug-enhanced psychodrama in which Number Two (Leo McKern) staged his own death and resurrection. Shortly afterwards, the Village was evacuated by UN troops, but Six was not among the inmates released and his whereabouts remain unknown.

Two was jailed for violating the Official Secrets Act and, while in prison, wrote a tell-all book about the Village which Thomas personally altered to redact classified information. With Two's twenty-year sentence ending, Thomas fears that he will return to the Village and will do something that will expose British covert operations. Meanwhile, Alice runs into a storm and finds herself shipwrecked on the island where the Village is located. Seeking help, Alice explores the Village and enters Two's house, where she finds a giant domed room. In the oval-shaped center chair sits a bearded man who tells her where she is and that she is Number Six. This man is the former, original Six.

Number Six: Twenty Years Later

Alice spends the night in Six's living quarters in the Village. The next morning, Six takes Alice on a tour. He says that the other Villagers were "free to go" while he was "free to stay." While Six is mysterious and distant, Alice finds him kind as he catches fish and makes them dinner. Later that night, Alice wanders away and is captured by Rover, which brings her back to meet the newly returned Number Two. Two claims that he has returned to help Six escape, describing him as a valuable and powerful man unjustly punished and driven mad for actions performed on behalf of his country. Alice is appalled at Two's glee and leaves angrily.

Back in London, Thomas and his partner, an American agent named Lee West, prepare a private expedition to the Village. Despite the lack of official resources from Thomas' superiors, the two men are convinced that the Village is at the center of someone's manipulations, as a number of people formerly tied to the Village have been assassinated. Meanwhile, Six and Alice are confronted by Two. Six, having been isolated from the modern technology in Alice's possession, voices his suspicions that Two sent her as a scout. Two and Six engage in a fistfight. Their battle takes them inside an old mill where Two gains the upper hand. As Two chokes Six, both fall out a window into the water below. Afterwards, Six enters his residence and begins to cut his beard.

Thomas and Lee bring a small handful of associates to the Village, while a group of soldiers sent by Thomas's superior, Director Ross of Operations, also arrive; the motives of both parties are unclear. Entering the dome room, Lee triggers the lift below the center chair, lowering them into the underground chambers. There they are met by Two, who claims that Six is dead. Lee and Thomas also discover several nuclear missiles. As Lee admonishes Thomas for not recognizing the true purpose of the Village, Two triggers the nukes without opening the silo doors. The Village is destroyed in a massive explosion, supposedly killing all who remain. Beyond the reach of the flames, however, Alice's boat, repaired with a Village waterwheel, is seen sailing away.

Back in London, Ross receives a report that indicates all the assassinations have one man in common: a mysterious, top-hatted man with a mustache. Ross takes the report to his superior, the Colonel, who has been replaced by the same mustached man. The report is burnt and his resignation demanded. Later that night, Ross is gassed unconscious in his home, loaded into a hearse by two men, and transported to whereabouts unknown, echoing Six's own abduction at the start of the TV series. At a park, Six assures Alice that his secrets are safe and bids her farewell with the Village salute, saying, "Be seeing you." The scene is shown on a video monitor in a control room similar to Two's office, located in the Palace of Westminster.

== Reception ==
Shattered Visage received mixed reviews from fans and critics. Howard Foy of The Unmutual fan site called the comic "a major disappointment" due to its contradictions with the series finale and wrote that "surely any sequel to The Prisoner must take as its starting point the closing moments of 'Fall Out.'" Foy was particularly displeased by Numbers Six and Two being at odds when "Fall Out" had ended with them apparently friends, writing, "Their return to the Village and their sworn enmity a la "Once Upon A Time" is a concept that is deeply unsatisfying and one that this reader found almost impossible to accept."

The Anorak Zone review also expressed distaste for the comic's "revisionist history," asking, "If you don't like the source, then why write a sequel to it? Also worrying is that anally retentive need to echo the dialogue of the series, and it doesn't feel particularly original." The content was also described as "not exactly dense" with "over 50 of its 187 pages having no dialogue."

Blogger Gordon Dymowski described Dean Motter's artwork as "unreadable and needlessly abstract" but expressed high regard for Motter and Mark Askwith's writing, calling it "superb, drawing disparate elements in a story that often feels like episodes 18 - 22 of the original series." He spoke well of the comic's interpretation of the series finale, saying that "the most clever part of Shattered Visage is how it integrates the sloppiness of 'Fall Out' into its story and allows Number Six to truly become a prisoner."

Art critic Frédérik Sisa, also writing on The Unmutual, found that Shattered Visage demonstrated "faithfulness to the characters, an understanding and elaboration of key themes, and a connection to the original series’ essential philosophical core." Sisa disagreed with other reviewers asserting that Shattered Visage depicts a defeated Number Six, writing, "Altogether, what we find in Shattered Visage’s Number Six are the same character traits as in the original series. If he was indeed broken by Degree Absolute, we find no clear sign of it in his behaviour or personality. Someone did break, however, and the case is strong that it was Number Two who fell to pieces." Sisa notes that Thomas Drake's files indicate Six never gave up any secrets and this combined with Number Two's irrational and suicidal actions make Two's account and sanity suspect.

Sisa viewed Number Six's presence in the Village as appropriate for a character who was "a lone wolf, a man who wanted time to think" and found that the comic addressed "Fall Out" in a respectful fashion, saying, "As controversial as it was for Motter and Askwith to revise 'Fall Out' as a hallucinogenic theatrical interrogation, the maneuver makes sense in terms of The Prisoner‘s literal story of a resigned government agent." Sisa wrote that the comic remains in line with the sentiments of "Fall Out" as Shattered Visage "reinforces the view that while the individual may not break and may even triumph over himself, he or she will always be in tension with society."

== See also ==
- List of comics based on television programs
