= Jeffrey Morgan (writer) =

Canadian writer and photographer

- Jeffrey Morgan in the recording studio, 1977
- Occupations: writer, Photographer, Biographer, Editor
- Writing career
- Pen name: Machine Rock
- Period: 1965 - present
- Genres: Rock Criticism, Satire
- Subject: Rock 'n' Roll
- Notable works: Authorized biographies of Alice Cooper and Iggy Pop & The Stooges, Creem, Mister X, Rock Critic Confidential, Jeffrey Morgan’s Media Blackout
- Notable awards: Superior Scribing Award, 2005
- Literary movement: Postmodern, Gonzo
- Website: www.facebook.com/jeffrey.morgan.writer

Jeffrey Morgan is a Canadian writer and photographer who is best known for being the authorized biographer of both Alice Cooper and Iggy Pop and The Stooges.

He is also the writer of the graphic novel The Brides of Mister X and Other Stories which Rolling Stone called "one of the 50 best non-superhero graphic novels".

In 2021, New Haven published Morgan's autobiography Rock Critic Confidential as a hardcover coffee table book containing over fifty years of Morgan's writing and photography, with an afterword written by Cooper.

In 2022, New Haven published Alice Cooper Confidential: Confessions! Secrets! Fan Mail! a collection of Morgan's previously unpublished interviews with Cooper, with an afterword written by Dennis Dunaway.

In 2024, New Haven published Iggy and The Stooges: The Authorized Biography an expanded edition of Morgan's 2009 biography with a new introduction written by Stooges guitarist James Williamson and a new afterword written by artist Shepard Fairey.

In 2026, Portland Press published Morgan's first prose novel Her Name Is Axis

== Writing ==
=== Creem ===
Morgan became the de facto Canadian editor of rock music magazine Creem after he was recruited by its editor, Lester Bangs, in the spring of 1974.

- Morgan's first published record review, of David Bowie's 1965 Pye Records single "Can't Help Thinking About Me", was published in the August 1975 issue. Morgan's writing then went on to appear in every issue of Creem until the magazine's demise in November 1988.
- In 2003, at the request of photographer Robert Matheu, Morgan renewed his relationship with the magazine by writing reviews and interviews for Matheu's new Creem website every month for five years until its demise in 2008.

=== Other writing ===
==== 1960s ====
Morgan's first published writing appeared in the November 1965 edition of the Brown Junior Public School magazine Brown News and Views. Morgan had two poems printed: "The Sun" and "ELEVEN DAYS."

==== 1970s ====
After being discovered by Bangs but prior to his first publication in Creem, Morgan graduated from Northern Secondary high school where he served in his final year as President of the Student Council. Morgan then spent the balance of 1974 honing his craft as a rock critic and rock photographer for York University's weekly newspaper Excalibur where he reviewed and photographed concerts by Elton John and George Harrison.

- While attending York, Morgan studied electronic music with James Tenney, who performed on Terry Riley's album In C.
- During this time, Morgan was the host of The Air Pirates Show on York's campus radio station CHRY-FM.
- From 1975 to 1978, Morgan was the editor of a free monthly Canadian rock magazine initially titled Cheap Thrills then StageLife and finally Roxy. All three incarnations were published by Concert Productions International, which was a major promoter of rock concerts and tours in North America run by Bill Ballard and future Rolling Stones concert promoter Michael Cohl. In addition to editing the magazine, Morgan also wrote for it extensively both under his own name and that of the more vociferous alter ego he created in April 1975, "Machine Rock".
- Six months later, Tee Vee Records in Canada released a compilation album titled Machine Rock: 23 Original Hits. Ballard and Cohl briefly considered suing Tee Vee for damages until they found out that Morgan had not registered his alias as a trademark.
- During this period, Morgan was also the staff copywriter for CBS Records Canada, for whom he wrote back cover liner notes for an album of baroque music by classical guitarist Liona Boyd. After reading them, however, Boyd demanded that Morgan's notes be deleted before the album was released, exclaiming: "You can't print this! He makes me sound like a rock star!"
- In 1977, Morgan's poetry was published in Rolling Stone magazine (Our Lady of Perpetual Motion) and Bakka magazine (Neuromantics I-V).
- In the late 1970s, Morgan was asked by Robert Christgau to participate in The Village Voice's annual Pazz & Jop critics' poll. In 1986, Christgau noted how Morgan skewed the "black caucus" vote by casting 30 points for James Brown's album Gravity.

==== 1980s ====
- During the 1980s, Morgan was a contributing writer for Wayne Green's magazine Digital Audio and Compact Disc Review. In 1986, several of his reviews were reprinted in Digital Audio's Guide To Compact Discs which was published by Bantam Books.
- During the mid-1980s, Morgan was the host of The Machine Rock Show on the Rogers Television community channel in Toronto.
- During the late 1980s, Morgan was the host of The Air Pirates Show on Ryerson Polytechnical Institute's campus radio station CKLN-FM.

==== 1990s ====
- During the 1990s, Morgan wrote reviews and biographies for LAUNCH Media, including a concert review of Diamanda Galás on her Malediction & Prayer tour, which Galás posted on her website.
- During the early 1990s, Morgan was the host of Cyberphonics on community radio station CFCR-FM in Saskatoon, which featured a five-minute spoken word segment, The Nuclear Hoedown, where he voiced the Jazz Geek and The Kapusta Kid Saskatchewan.
- In 1992, Morgan was asked by Rob Bowman to name the Lou Reed anthology that he was assembling with Reed for RCA Records. Morgan named the three disc box set Between Thought and Expression, after his favorite Velvet Underground song "Some Kinda Love". In return, Bowman thanked Morgan in his booklet liner notes to the anthology.
- In 1997, Morgan's Creem interview with William S. Burroughs was translated into Spanish and reprinted in Barcelona's AVUI newspaper.

==== 2000s ====
- Between 2004 and 2009, Morgan wrote an award-winning weekly newspaper column for Detroit's Metro Times titled Jeffrey Morgan's Media Blackout. In 2010, the column relocated first to rocksbackpages.com and then to Morgan's own website.
- In 2006, Morgan was asked to submit a list of his ten favorite Canadian albums for tabulation in Bob Mersereau's hardcover book The Top 100 Canadian Albums, which was published in 2007 by Goose Lane Editions.
- In 2008, Morgan wrote the introduction "What Is and What Will Always Be" for the hardcover book Sonic Boom: The Impact of Led Zeppelin.
- In 2009, Morgan told the story of how Bangs discovered him in Curse You, Lester Bangs!!! which appears in the hardcover book CREEM: America's Only Rock 'n' Roll Magazine published by HarperCollins.
- Also in 2009, Morgan wrote a feature review of the Queen album Hot Space for the hardcover Voyageur Press book Queen: The Ultimate Illustrated History of the Crown Kings of Rock.

==== 2010s ====
- In 2010, Morgan wrote a review of the Bachman–Turner Overdrive song "Takin' Care of Business" for Mersereau's follow-up hardcover book, The Top 100 Canadian Singles.
- In 2012, a previously unpublished contemporary concert review of The Rolling Stones performing at Maple Leaf Gardens in Toronto on July 15, 1972, which was written by Morgan "the very next day in the heat of the moment", was published in Portuguese in the limited edition hardcover book Rolling Stones em Portugal. Morgan's review was illustrated with a previously unpublished photograph of the Stones playing Cobo Hall in Detroit, taken by Robert Matheu the night before on July 14, 1972.
- In 2013, Morgan wrote a feature review of the first Rush album Rush for Voyageur's hardcover book Rush: The Illustrated History.
- In 2014, Morgan wrote the liner notes for the album Wicked by the 24th Street Wailers.
- Also in 2014, Morgan was interviewed by Punk Globe Magazine about his writing and photography
- In 2015, Morgan was interviewed by North Toronto Post magazine about his student days at Northern Secondary including his tenure as Student Council President, his rock photography, and his career as a rock critic and biographer.
- In 2017, Morgan was interviewed by Hard Rock Daddy's Inferno of Rock Report about his career as a rock critic and photographer.

==== 2020s ====
- In 2020, Morgan wrote the introduction "Call Me Crazy" for the hardcover book Headquartered: A Timeline of The Monkees Solo Years.
- Also in 2020, Morgan signed with New Haven Publishing Ltd. in the United Kingdom to write his memoirs.
- In 2021, New Haven published Morgan's autobiography Rock Critic Confidential as a hardcover coffee table book containing over fifty years of Morgan's writing and photography.
- In 2022, New Haven published the second volume of Morgan's autobiography Alice Cooper Confidential: Confessions! Secrets! Fan Mail!.
- In 2024, New Haven published the third volume of Morgan's autobiography Iggy and The Stooges: The Authorized Biography.
- In 2025, Morgan interviewed film director W. D. Richter and screenwriter Earl Mac Rauch for the 40th anniversary of The Adventures of Buckaroo Banzai Across the 8th Dimension.
- In 2026, Portland Press published Morgan's first prose novel Her Name Is Axis.

=== Alice Cooper ===
In 1992, Morgan began writing the authorized biography of Alice Cooper, which would take him seven years to complete. His finished biography, titled Alcohol and Razor Blades, Poison and Needles: The Glorious Wretched Excess of Alice Cooper, All-American, appears in the box set The Life and Crimes of Alice Cooper which was published by Warner Bros. on April 20, 1999.

- Morgan also wrote the liner notes for two other Cooper albums: 2001's Mascara and Monsters: The Best of Alice Cooper and the 2002 reissue of Welcome To My Nightmare.
- In 2003, the International Journal of Academic Psychiatry cited Morgan's authorized biography in their paper "From Alice Cooper to Marilyn Manson: The Significance of Adolescent Antiheroes".
- In 2011, the Rock and Roll Hall of Fame and Museum further cited Morgan's authorized biography as "Recommended Reading" about Alice Cooper, alongside Alice's own 1976 autobiography Me, Alice.
- In 2012, Morgan appeared with Cooper and record producer Bob Ezrin on the BBC World Service radio documentary The Bizarre and Influential World of Alice Cooper.
- In 2021, Cooper wrote the afterword to Morgan's autobiography Rock Critic Confidential which was published by New Haven on June 28, 2021.
- In 2022, Alice Cooper Group bass guitarist Dennis Dunaway wrote the afterword to the second volume of Morgan's autobiography Alice Cooper Confidential which was published by New Haven on September 15, 2022.

=== The Stooges ===
In 2008, Morgan and collaborator Robert Matheu began co-writing the authorized biography of The Stooges. Their finished biography, titled The Stooges, Yes appears in The Stooges: The Authorized and Illustrated Story which was edited by Morgan and published in hardcover by Abrams on October 1, 2009. After reading the biography, Iggy Pop wrote Morgan: "Jeffrey, you're a smartass—watch it!".

- In 2024, Stooges guitarist James Williamson wrote the introduction to a new edition of Morgan's 2009 autobiography Iggy and The Stooges: The Authorized Biography which was published in hardcover by New Haven on May 20, 2024.

== Photography ==
In 1974, York University's weekly newspaper Excalibur published Morgan's photographs of Elton John and George Harrison. In 2013, Morgan exhibited both photos on his website.

- In 1975, Morgan's first appearance in Creem was as a photographer with a 1974 black-and-white photograph of Lou Reed and Alice Cooper singing "Goodnight Ladies" together on stage at Massey Hall, which Lester Bangs used to illustrate his infamous March 1975 cover story Let Us Now Praise Famous Death Dwarves. In 2013, Morgan exhibited a second portrait from this concert on his website.
- Also in 1975, Morgan's portrait of comic book artist Barry Smith was published in Jim Steranko's magazine Mediascene.
- Between 1975 and 1978, Concert Productions International published many of Morgan's photographs in their rock magazines, often without credit, including portraits of Bowie, Reed, and Freddie Mercury.
- In May 1978, Creem published Morgan's portrait of Amanda Lear. In 2013, Morgan exhibited the photo on his website.
- Also in 1978, Morgan received a Photography Grant from the Ontario Arts Council for a portfolio of work done at York while studying with photographer Shin Sugino.
- In 1988, author Nancy Baker commissioned Morgan to photograph her for the June 1988 issue of Rod Serling's The Twilight Zone Magazine. In 2012, Morgan's portrait was used as the backdrop for Baker's appearance at the World Fantasy Convention.
- In 2020, Reelin' In The Years Productions became the authorized representatives of Morgan's photographic archive to license it worldwide.
- In 2021, Morgan's photograph of Lou Reed and Alice Cooper on stage at Massey Hall was printed in That Night At Massey Hall.
- Also in 2021, New Haven published Morgan's autobiography Rock Critic Confidential as a hardcover coffee table book containing over fifty years of Morgan's writing and photography.

== Comics ==
In 1966, Morgan's second published writing appeared when DC Comics printed Morgan's letter in the comic book letters section of Batman #182.

- Later that decade, Morgan began writing numerous letters to the Marvel Comics Group, many of which were printed during the early 1970s in the letters section of such Marvel comics as Fantastic Four #95, The Amazing Spider-Man #82, Sgt. Fury and his Howling Commandos #78, The Avengers #73 and Conan the Barbarian #5. More often than not, whenever one of Morgan's letters wasn't published, he received a compensatory Marvel No-Prize in the mail.
- It was during this second letter writing phase that Morgan's first known piece of satirical writing was published. In the letters section of Captain America #122, he had two consecutive letters printed: the first under his own name and home address and, directly beneath it, a second separately-sent letter from "Toronto, Ontario" which he'd signed with the name of deceased villain Baron Zemo. In it, "Zemo" implored Marvel writer/editor Stan Lee against resurrecting Cap's former World War II teen partner Bucky Barnes in favor of himself: "I’m begging you, Stan--keep the kid dead and let me return!" Lee, who had met Morgan eighteen months earlier in Toronto, wrote the following editorial reply: "Sooo! The infamous Baron Zemo is alive and well in Toronto, ehhh? (TORONTO?!?)".
- Over the next few years, Morgan's style of comic book letter writing would become so distinctive that the iconoclastic American humor magazine National Lampoon parodied his letter writing style in their "Is Nothing Sacred?" issue (January 1972). In the Marvel pastiche Son-O’-God Comics which was written by Canadian associate editor Michel Choquette, the first letter in the fake letters section at the end of the story was attributed to having been written by "Stan Spooner, Toronto, Canada". This parody letter accurately spoofed Morgan's writing style in tone and spirit, right down to its similar use of a spiritual closing salutation (Morgan: Pacem in Terris; Spooner: Yours in Christ).
- In 1973, Morgan began writing letters to Creem, which led to his hiring, a year later, by Lester Bangs.
- One of Morgan's first instances as a comic book writer appeared in issue #16 (April 1979) of the alternative press anthology series Star*Reach. His 16-page cover story, Murphy’s Law, was illustrated by Ken Steacy.

=== Mister X ===
- In November 1988, Morgan was hired to write volume two of Dean Motter's Vortex Comics series Mister X, the first volume of which ran 12 issues cover-dated June 1984 to August 1988. When Motter left the first, color series to work on other projects, he asked Morgan to assume the writing duties for a second, black-and-white volume, which ran 12 issues cover-dated April 1989 to March 1990.
- In 2008, again at Motter's behest, Morgan wrote 'Motivation By Obsession: The Architect + The Archetype' as the introduction to Volume One of Dark Horse Comics' hardcover omnibus Mister X: The Archives.
- In 2011, Dark Horse reprinted Morgan's Mister X stories in a 320-page deluxe hardcover edition titled The Brides of Mister X and Other Stories.
- In 2013, Schreiber & Leser reprinted Morgan's Mister X introduction as 'Motivation Durch Obsession: Der Architekt + Der Archetyp' in their German language edition of Mister X: The Archives
- In 2018, Cosmo Comics reprinted Morgan's Mister X introduction as 'Motivato Dall'Ossessioneion: L'Architetto + L'Archetipo' in their Italian language edition of Mister X: The Archives
- In 2019, Rolling Stone magazine said "Mister X is one of the greats: the speed-addicted, sleepless, sunglasses wearing architect of the insanity-inducing Radiant City. A high-contrast blend of Art Deco design, noir accents and flying cars, Mister X remains a high point of retro-futurist comic coolness and is one of the 50 best non-superhero graphic novels" and provided a link to Morgan's graphic novel.

== Music ==
In 1975, Morgan met conceptual illustrator and graphic designer Dean Motter, with whom he would collaborate on a number of projects. Between 1977 and 1980, they recorded an "ambient electronic avant-garde progressive art rock album" called Thrilling Women under the collective band name of the Air Pirates, in tribute to the original Air Pirates. The album featured vocalist Paul Robinson of The Diodes, guitarist Toby Swann of Battered Wives, and saxophonist Andy Haas of Martha And The Muffins.

- In 2002, a song from the album, "A Darkened Stretch", was released by Bongo Beat Records on the compilation Driving In The Rain: 3AM (Songs To Get Lost With).
- In 2011, Bongo Beat released the complete album Thrilling Women: The Lost Air Pirates Sessions - Toronto: 1977 - 1980 as a music download.

== See also ==
- List of newspaper columnists
- List of Canadian writers
- List of Canadian poets
- List of Canadian musicians
- List of Northern Secondary School alumni
- List of York University people
