= Black Kiss 2 =

Comic book series by Howard Chaykin

- Black Kiss 2 trade paperback cover, art by Howard Chaykin

Publication information
- Publisher: Image Comics
- Schedule: Monthly
- Format: Limited series
- Genre: Crime, erotic; Vampire
- Publication date: August 2012 – January 2013
- No. of issues: 6
- Main character(s): Dagmar Laine; Beverly Grove; Cass Pollack

Creative team
- Created by: Howard Chaykin
- Written by: Howard Chaykin
- Artist: Howard Chaykin
- Letterer: Ken Bruzenak
- Editor: Thomas K.

Black Kiss 2 (often styled as Black Kiss II) is a six-issue hardboiled erotic American comic book limited series written and drawn by Howard Chaykin, which was originally published in 2012 to 2013 by Image Comics.

It is a follow-up to Chaykin's 1988–89 series Black Kiss, and like its predecessor attracted considerable controversy due to its sexual content. Narratively it covers a period of over a hundred years, functioning as both a prequel and sequel to the original series.

== Creation ==
After noting he was planning to follow up Black Kiss in 2010, telling Comic Book Resources "I've got the premise for the sequel, but I haven't had the opportunity or the time to do it yet. But that time will come shortly". He would later describe it as a prequel.

The nucleus for the sequel was inspired by the song "I'm Still Here" from Stephen Sondheim musical Follies, and Sondheim's explanation that it was based on the life of Joan Crawford. After shopping the pitch around several companies he chose to work with Image Comics, as they were "the only company that was more than willing to do exactly what I wanted to do", and retained the black-and-white interior art and full script method used on the first series. The partnership was announced at the 2011 San Diego Comic-Con. Black Kiss 2 retained the 10-page chapter structure of the first series, with two chapters in each issue. Each pair of chapters would take place in a different era, and Chaykin hoped he would be "able to deliver material that will appall and disgust a modern generation".

== Publication ==
When Black Kiss 2 No. 1 was published in August 2012, Rich Johnston of Bleeding Cool described it as "the most explicit Image comic book to date", but noted the title being carried in Diamond Previews was a considerable change in the industry compared to the publication's handling of the first series.

=== Legal issues ===
Like the original series, Black Kiss 2 also encountered legal attention. Copies of the first issue shipped to the United Kingdom were seized by customs; the comics were released on the proviso that they were not sold to minors but ahead of the release of the second issue Diamond Comic Distributors announced they would not be shipping further issues to the UK to avoid knock-on hold-ups to other titles – effectively stopping the issue from being ordered by British stores due to Image titles being exclusive to Diamond, though Rich Johnston noted that it did not make selling the title illegal. A similar situation also developed in Canada.

In May 2013, Black Kiss 2 was one of 56 titles removed from the iOS version of online comic sales platform ComiXology after pressure from Apple. Chaykin, who mistakenly believed ComiXology was a blog review platform, was typically bullish about the controversy, stating "I’m long past giving a shit what people think about me and my work. As my wife pointed out to me not too long ago, most of these blogging shitheads are anonymous pu**ies who’d kill to have my job and my life."

=== Special ===
A one-off "Christmas Special" followed in July 2014, named Black Kiss – XXXMas in July.

== Plot ==
On the Lower East Side in 1906, a Nickelodeon audience is sexually assaulted by a succubus. In the North Atlantic in Spring 1912, Charlie 'Bubba' Kenton loses his virginity to one of the succubus' victims as the Titanic strikes an iceberg and sinks; Kenton is pulled from the sea and escapes death on a lifeboat, believing the demon to have perished on board.

In Hollywood in 1919, Bubba is acting in Hollywood, where his protégé Eunice MacAvoy is in a lesbian relationship with film star Devora Whitehead, who refuses his advances. He shoots a pornographic film with Eunice, and his semen turns her into his immortal disciple. Eunice fellates the camera operator, then bites his penis off; Devora and her submissive husband Derek soon become their followers. On Christmas Eve, 1931 Bubba and his followers are in Zona Norte, Tijuana. Eunice has changed her name to Ilona Fontaine, and meets the transsexual Dagmar Laine. Dagmar joins Bubba and Ilona for a threesome, and Dagmar quickly falls under Ilona's thrall. They leave the Whiteheads behind in Mexico.

By Spring 1942 they are in occupied Paris. Ilona has taken on the name of Blanche DeWolfe, and is performing topless cabaret at nightclubs with Dagmar, where they pose as sisters and have sex with both Nazis and French collaborators before killing them. However, on one occasion their getaway driver Georges Cuvier lets them down and Dagmar is captured by the SS and tortured. Refusing to give Ilona away, Dagmar is executed by guillotine. A furious Ilona hunts down and kills Georges, stating she spent a long time looking for someone exactly like Dagmar, and thanks to him has lost her. Having faked her death, she resurfaces in 1957 in Vanaheim, a town in Orange County, California, now using the identity Beverly Grove and murdering men while she searches for another Dagmar. She discovers one called Kim being gang-raped in a diner, and butchers the assailants, taking her and leaving town – telling her she is now called Dagmar.

They enjoy Mardi Gras in New Orleans' French Quarter in 1962, where Dagmar is appearing in pornographic films and Beverly has started a film career once again – while continuing to kill, sometimes to cover her path and sometimes for pleasure. 15 years later they visit Studio 54 and meet Andy Warhol just before the New York City blackout of 1977. Beverly goes looting with Andy's lover Peter Langan, and is beginning to tire of the aging Dagmar. She styles Peter as a replacement; when Dagmar objects, Beverly snaps her neck during a brawl, and recruits Peter as the new Dagmar.

In 1984 in Los Angeles, Ellen Pollack is having an affair with Detective Ricky Fabrikant, while across town her husband Cass is having an affair with Ricky's wife Loretta. Beverly and Dagmar are also in town; Beverly has sex with a crossdresser called Danny. As a result, Danny falls under her control and arranges for Detective Fabrikant to kill Dagmar, visiting Beverly to take her place as thrall. Three years after their encounter with Beverly, Cass and Rosemary are in Las Vegas in 1991, where he plays jazz in a club on The Strip. He is approached at a bar by a blonde transvestite who leads him to an orgy. The blonde empties an urn on herself and is explosively reborn as Beverly; Cass leaves and grabs Rosemary, and the pair flee from Vegas.

After changing his name to Paul Kastner, Cass is living in San Francisco in 2001, playing at the Embarcadero. Rosemary is also with him and the pair are squabbling constantly after spending a decade on the run, impairing his relationship with singer Verna Mirande. Despite their efforts, Beverly – now using the name Kitty – and her latest Dagmar – formerly Desiree, formerly Alan – track them down. Dagmar approaches him at the club and Cass runs, only to find one of Beverly's associates has reached Rosemary, killing her in front of him. Beverly then kills the thug and plans to frame Cass for both murders. Instead Beverly takes Cass as her lover alongside Dagmar, and the three of them are living in Santa Varda, Southern California by 2010. By this point Cass and Beverly are lovers, and she asks him to kill Dagmar, who they have set up as a dominatrix. Cass shoots Dagmar, and Beverly tells Cass that she is finally past the need for a Dagmar, and that she will settle with Cass until he is too old – at which point she will gut him, eat him and find someone new.

== Collected editions ==
Title	ISBN	Release date	Contents
Black Kiss 2	9781607067603	30 July 2013	Black Kiss 2 #1–6

== Reception ==
Rich Johnston of Bleeding Cool called the first issue "intelligently told, with some great storytelling tricks along the way". Reviewing the issue for Major Spoilers, Matthew Peterson gave the issue 3½ stars out of 5, warning readers of the high level of sexual content and querying the positioning of the chapter break but praising the "art and narrative".

Joe Glass of Bleeding Cool criticised Chaykin's attitude towards transsexuals various works, noting Black Kiss 2 "again features pre-op transgender characters in very sexualised scenarios".
