= Star Crossed (comics) =

Comic book limited series

- Cover to Star Crossed No. 1 - The Black Holes of Logic, art by Matt Howarth

Publication information
- Publisher: Helix (DC Comics imprint)
- Schedule: Monthly
- Format: Miniseries
- Publication date: 1997
- No. of issues: 3
- Main character(s): Dyltah; Saa

Creative team
- Created by: Matt Howarth
- Written by: Matt Howarth
- Artist: Matt Howarth
- Colorist: Chris Chuckry
- Editor: Stuart Moore

Star Crossed is a three-issue comic book miniseries published in 1997 under the short-lived DC Comics imprint Helix. Written and illustrated by Matt Howarth, Star Crossed recounts the surrealist tale of a deep-space romance between a genetically engineered über-woman and a sentient asteroid. Consistent with the performance of other Helix titles, Star Crossed failed to appeal to a broad readership and the poor sales figures which accompanied its publication coincided with a general downturn in the American comic book industry.

== Plot synopsis ==
Dyltah is a being from the far-future, a loner: she forsakes the humanity of her upbringing and elects to undergo a genetic transformation, becoming "a living lightsail" who glides the solar currents of deep space. She commences an unlikely romance with Saa, a sentient chunk of space-rock.

Part parody, part space opera, Star Crossed pays oblique homage to Shakespeare's Romeo and Juliet as the dalliance of the two lovers draws the attention of various political factions within the Solar System including that of human beings who live in a pod colony in orbit near Jupiter. The mutated Jovians are antagonised by the presence of the genetically optimised Dyltah and the various parties are gradually drawn into conflict as the narrative develops.
