= God Nose =

American underground comic

- Cover of the first printing

Publication information
- Publisher: Jack Jackson
- Format: One-shot
- Publication date: 1964
- No. of issues: 1
- Main character(s): God, Jesus

Creative team
- Written by: Jaxon
- Artist(s): Jaxon

God Nose is a 42-page American comic book produced in 1964 by Jack "Jaxon" Jackson and is considered one of the first underground comix. God Nose centers on philosophical discussions between God and the "fools he rules".

== Plot ==
God Nose portrays God as an old man with a white beard and a crown, sitting on a golden throne in Heaven. He and Jesus discuss modern life, including such controversial topics as birth control and racism. At one point, Jesus returns to Earth to be a folk singer and to try out surfing. God also visits Earth, at one point materializing into the bedroom of a couple as they are about to make love.

== Publication history ==
Jaxon's God Nose strip first appeared in the Florida college fanzine Charlatan, where it was published from 1963 to at least 1966.

In 1964, Jaxon collected a number of the previous strips, and printed 1,000 copies on a Xerox machine at the Texas State Capital print shop after hours. The first printing of God Nose is 8-1/2" x 11" in size and 42 pages long.

Rip Off Press, an underground publisher co-founded by Jaxon, did a second printing in 1969, with a revised cover lacking a cover price and with a pink border with red central color. The third printing, also by Rip Off Press, has a blue border with green central color and a 50c price below the basketball hoop. Rip Off Press did a fourth and final printing in 1971; it has a red border with yellow central color and a 50c cover price. The second-fourth printings are standard comic book size, 44 pages long.

The entirety of God Nose was also reprinted as Underground Classics (Rip Off Press, 1985 series) #6 (1988).
