= Jaxon (cartoonist) =

American cartoonist (1941-2006)

Jack Jackson
- Born: May 15, 1941 Pandora, Texas, US
- Died: June 8, 2006 (aged 65) Stockdale, Texas, US
- Areas: Cartoonist, illustrator, historian, writer
- Pseudonym: Jaxon
- Notable works: God Nose; Rip Off Press historical comics

Jack Edward Jackson (May 15, 1941 – June 8, 2006), also known by his pen name Jaxon, was an American cartoonist, illustrator, historian, and writer. He co-founded Rip Off Press, and some consider him to be the first underground comix artist, due to his most well-known satirical comic strip God Nose.

== Early life ==
Jackson was born in 1941 in Pandora, Texas. He majored in accounting at the University of Texas and was a staffer for its Texas Ranger humor magazine, until he and others were fired over what he called "a petty censorship violation".

== Career ==
In 1964, Jackson self-published the one-shot God Nose, which is considered by some to be the first underground comic in the modern sense, discounting “Tijuana bibles”. He moved to San Francisco in 1966, where he became art director of the dance-poster division of the Family Dog psychedelic rock music-promotion collective. In 1969, he co-founded Rip Off Press, one of the first independent publishers of underground comix, with three other Texas transplants, Gilbert Shelton, Fred Todd, and Dave Moriaty. Despite this, most of his underground comics work (heavily influenced by EC Comics) was published by Last Gasp, including frequent contributions to the Last Gasp anthology Slow Death. (Jaxon left his affiliation with Last Gasp in c. 1991.)

In addition to Slow Death, Jackson contributed to a selection of other underground comix, including Barbarian Comics (California Comics) and Radical America Komiks (Radical America Magazine). In the 1980s Jaxon contributed historical comics to Fantagraphics' Graphics Story Monthly and a number of Kitchen Sink Press titles, including BLAB! and the 11-part, 126-page "Bulto… The Cosmic Slug," about a space creature's effect on the people of the ancient Southwest, which was serialized in Death Rattle. Jackson did freelance work for Marvel Comics as a colorist from 1988 to 1991.

Jackson was also known for his historical work, documenting the history of Native America and Texas, including the graphic novels Comanche Moon (1979), Recuerden El Alamo (1979), Los Tejanos (1982), The Secret of San Saba (1989), Lost Cause (1998), Indian Lover: Sam Houston & the Cherokees (1999), El Alamo (2002), and the written works like Los Mesteños: Spanish Ranching in Texas: 1721–1821 (1986), Indian Agent: Peter Ellis Bean in Mexican Texas (2005), and many others.

The Texas State Historical Association commissioned him to produce a new version of the 1920s racist comic strip Texas History Movies; Jackson's New Texas History Movies was his last work before his death, and was published in 2007 (ISBN 978-0876112236).

== Personal life ==
Jackson was found dead outside a cemetery in Stockdale, Texas on June 8, 2006, in an apparent suicide after being diagnosed with prostate cancer.

== Legacy and honors ==
- Lifetime fellowship to Texas Historical Association
- Judges' Choice for The Will Eisner Award Hall of Fame in 2011

== Bibliography ==
=== Comics-format ===
- God Nose (self-published, 1964; republished by Rip Off Press, 1969)
- Happy Endings Comics (Rip Off Press, Aug. 1969)
- Comanche Moon: A Picture Narrative About Cynthia Ann Parker (Rip Off Press, 1979)
- Recuerden El Alamo: The True Story of Juan N. Seguin and his Fight for Texas Independence (Last Gasp, 1979)
- Los Tejanos (Fantagraphics Books, 1982)
- Jaxon's Illustrated Tales (FTR Publishing, 1984)
- The Secret of San Saba: A Tale of Phantoms and Greed in the Spanish Southwest (Kitchen Sink Press, 1989)
- Optimism of Youth: The Underground Work of Jack Jackson (Fantagraphics Books, 1991)
- (adaptation of the novel by James Fenimore Cooper) Dark Horse Classics: Last of the Mohicans (Dark Horse Comics, 1992)
- (with Neal Barrett, Jr., adapted from the novel by Joe R. Lansdale) Dead in the West (Dark Horse Comics, 1993)
- God's Bosom and Other Stories: The Historical Strips of Jack Jackson (Fantagraphics Books, 1995)
- "Threadgill's: The Comic Book," in Threadgill's: The Cookbook (Longstreet Press, 1996)
- Lost Cause: John Wesley Hardin, the Taylor-Sutton Feud, and Reconstruction Texas (Kitchen Sink Press, 1998)
- Indian Lover: Sam Houston & the Cherokees (Mojo Press, 1999)
- The Alamo: An Epic Told from Both Sides (Paisano Graphics, 2002) — self-published
- New Texas History Movies (Texas State Historical Association, 2007: ISBN 978-0876112236)

=== Prose ===
- Long Shadows: Indian Leaders Standing in the Path of Manifest Destiny, 1600–1900. Amarillo, TX: Paramount Publishing, 1985.
- Los Mesteños: Spanish Ranching in Texas, 1721–1821. College Station, Texas: Texas A&M University Press, 1986.
- (with Maurine T. Wilson) Philip Nolan and Texas Expeditions to the Unknown Land, 1791–1801. Waco, TX: Texian Press, 1987.
- Mapping Texas & the Gulf Coast: The Contributions of Saint-Denis, Oliván, & Le Maire. College Station, TX: Texas A&M University Press, 1990.
- Imaginary Kingdom: Texas As Seen by the Rivera & Rubi Military Expeditions, 1727 & 1767. Austin, Texas: Texas State Historical Association, 1995.
- Flags Along the Coast: Charting the Gulf of Mexico, 1519–1759. Austin, TX: Book Club of Texas/Wind River Press, 1995.
- Shooting the Sun: Cartographic Results of Military Activities in Texas, 1689–1892. Austin, TX: Book Club of Texas/Wind River Press, 1998.
- (ed., with trans. John Wheat) Texas by Terán: The Diary Kept by General Manuel de Mier y Terán on His 1828 Inspection of Texas. Austin, TX: University of Texas Press, 2000.
- Indian Agent: Peter Ellis Bean In Mexican Texas. College Station, TX: Texas A&M University Press, 2005.
- Almonte’s Texas: Juan N. Almonte's 1834 Inspection, Secret Report, and Role in the 1836 Campaign. Austin, TX: Texas State Historical Association, 2005.
