= Meta 4 =

Comic book series by Ted McKeever

- Cover of issue #1

Publication information
- Publisher: ShadowLine
- Publication date: June 2010
- No. of issues: 5

Creative team
- Created by: Ted McKeever

Meta 4 is a five-issue comic book series by Ted McKeever published by ShadowLine.

== Plot ==
Meta 4 begins with an astronaut waking on a beach with amnesia—he is unable to recall how he got there. The astronaut meets a large muscular woman named "Gasolina" who is dressed in a costume resembling that of Santa Claus. The astronaut notices a number of scars on his body that he can not explain. Author Ted McKeever has called the significance of these scars twofold: "They are both evidence of a mystery that will unfold as the story progresses, as well as a textured map that has meaning to it because of where they are on his body".

== Production ==
McKeever began actively producing Meta 4 after doing a series of black-and-white short story comics for publisher Marvel. It is based on notes he had compiled over previous years. McKeever has described the work as "a journey of self-discovery on a road trip of bizarre nightmares, twisted romance and scientific comedic insanity, spanning from Coney Island to the desolate Midwest". He has also described the main two characters as representing two different mysteries: the astronaut being the mystery of physicality, and Gasolina being the mystery of language.

== Reception ==
Chris Arrant of Newsarama said that the art style of the series is difficult to describe, but that it is "more identifiable than 99% of comics’ artists out there".
