= List of Northern Secondary School alumni =

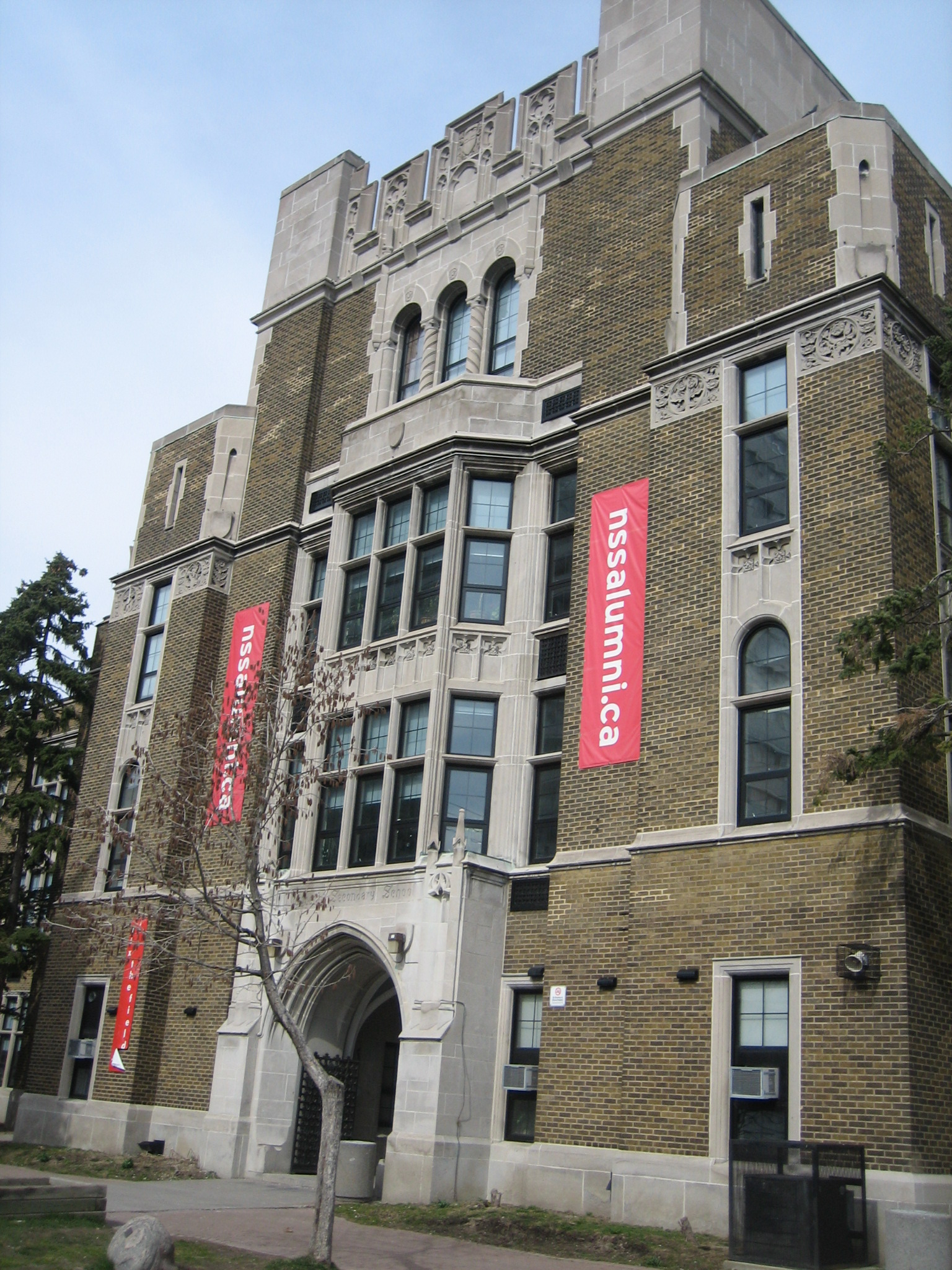
Northern Secondary School

The following is a selective list of notable alumni of the Northern Secondary School, in Toronto, Ontario.

== List ==
=== Television and film ===
Name	Notability
Patrick J. Adams	Actor, USA Network's series Suits
Marco Brambilla	Director of Demolition Man
Susan Clark	Actress, TV series Webster
Michael Dobson	Voice actor
Jayne Eastwood	TV and film actress, King of Kensington, Dawn of the Dead (2004)
Sally Gifford	Host on CBC's national children's show The-X
Chris Lightfoot	Actor, Nikita, Dan For Mayor, Warehouse 13
Ted Nasmith	Canadian illustrator, known for his renditions of Tolkien's The Lord of the Rings and The Silmarillion
Ann Rohmer	Television personality on CP24 and CityTV Toronto
Kelly Rowan	Actress, The O.C.
Emma Seligman	Director and screenwriter, Shiva Baby and Bottoms
Ali Velshi	Journalist with Al Jazeera America and formerly CNN
Zack Ward	Actor, CSI, Cold Case, Transformers
Richard Williams	Won two Academy Awards as director of animation for Who Framed Roger Rabbit

=== Professional sports ===
Name	Notability
Matt Black	Played for the Toronto Argonauts in the Canadian Football League (CFL)
Tom Europe	Played for the Winnipeg Blue Bombers and BC Lions in the Canadian Football League (CFL)
Simon Farine	Plays basketball (2011–12) for the Maccabi Haifa B.C. team in the Israeli Premier League
Bob Goldham	Won two Stanley Cup championships with the Toronto Maple Leafs and three with the Detroit Red Wings in the National Hockey League (NHL); analyst on Hockey Night in Canada with the CBC
Dave Lougheed	Played for Canadian National Rugby team and participated in the 2003 Rugby World Cup
Neil Lumsden	As a player, he helped win three CFL Grey Cup titles with the Edmonton Eskimos; as General Manager he helped the Tiger-Cats win the Grey Cup in 1999
Nemanja Mitrović	Professional basketball player
Ashtone Morgan	Plays for Toronto FC in Major League Soccer; first TFC Academy graduate to play for Canadian National Team
Leif Pettersen	Played for Saskatchewan Roughriders and Hamilton Tiger-Cats in the CFL
Jack Wedley	Toronto Argonauts football player, holds the record for most Grey Cup championships
Raymond Ma	Beijing Ducks basketball player, Chinese Rookie of the Year award 2018.

=== Arts and literature ===
Name	Notability
Claire Cameron	Canadian author and journalist.
Herbert H. Carnegie	Became a member of the Order of Canada in 2003; a top hockey player in the country, but at the time (1940s and 1950s), blacks were unofficially rarely able to enter the top professional level; author; created the Herbert H. Carnegie Future Aces, which awards scholarships. Elected to the Hockey Hall of Fame in 2022
John Chidley-Hill	Canadian sports journalist
Anne Fleming	Canadian fiction writer; finalist for the Governor General's Award
Andrew MacNaughtan	Multiple Juno Award-winning photographer, director and album art designer; long time photographer for the band Rush; founder of Art Gives Hope, a charity created to help families in Africa affected by HIV/AIDS
Jeffrey Morgan	Authorized biographer of Alice Cooper, Iggy Pop, and The Stooges; Canadian Editor of CREEM: America's Only Rock 'n' Roll Magazine; columnist for Detroit's Metro Times; President of Northern Secondary Student Council, 1973-1974
Mookie Morris	Top 5 Canadian Idol finalist; Northern Music Department graduate

=== Music ===
Name	Notability
Dave Beckett	Member of Gary and Dave
Grandson (musician)	Political trap rock musician signed to Fueled by Ramen
Garth Mosbaugh	Tenor singer for the Canadian band The Nylons
Bruce Palmer	Bass guitarist for 60s American rock group Buffalo Springfield (with Neil Young); member of Rock and Roll Hall of Fame

=== Fashion ===
Name	Notability
Dean and Dan Caten	Fashion designers, founders of Dsquared^{2}, a high-end Milan fashion label

=== Military ===
Name	Notability
Wally Floody	Second World War RCAF Spitfire pilot, instrumental in organizing and implementing the "Great Escape" from the German Stalag Luft III prisoner of war camp

=== Business ===
Name	Notability
Ariel Garten	Artist, scientist and co-founder of InteraXon

=== Humanitarianism, activism, social work and others ===
Name	Notability
Aileen Williams	Black Canadian activist and founding member of the Canadian Women's Negro Association (CANEWA)
