= Those Annoying Post Bros =

Comic by Matt Howarth

Those Annoying Post Bros.
- The cover of Those Annoying Post Bros. #1 (Vortex Comics, Jan. 1985), art by Matt Howarth.

Publication information
- Publisher: Vortex Comics (Jan. 1985-Jan. 1990); Rip Off Press (Apr. 1991-Apr. 1994); MU Press (Aug. 1994-1998)
- Format: Ongoing series
- Genre: independent comic
- Publication date: Jan. 1985 – 1998
- No. of issues: 63
- Main character(s): Ron Post; Russ Post; Bulldaggers; Savage Henry

Creative team
- Created by: Matt Howarth
- Written by: Matt Howarth, Lou Stathis
- Artist: Matt Howarth
- Letterer(s): Ty Templeton, Matt Howarth

Collected editions
- Das Loot: ISBN 9781883847067
- Disturb the Neighbors: ISBN 978-1883847159

Those Annoying Post Bros. is an independent comic mostly by Matt Howarth about two fun-loving bad boys, Ron Post and Russ Post, from the fictional Bugtown. Equally inspired by H. P. Lovecraft, Philip K. Dick, and ambient electronic music, the series ran for 63 issues (published by a number of companies) from 1985–1998, making it one of the longest-running indy comics titles.

== Plot and characters ==
The Post Bros., Ron and Russ (named for brothers Ron and Russ Mael, the duo that make up the American pop and Rock duo, Sparks), are natives of a mysterious transdimensional locality known as Bugtown, where all residents possess the ability to engage in interdimensional travel. Anyone killed in Bugtown or brought there immediately after death will soon regenerate. According to creator Howarth, the Post Bros. are "greedy, pathologically trigger-happy, completely corruptible, endlessly irritating, psychotically solipsistic and — unfortunately for all — possessed of the ability to instantly shift between all possible reality levels".

The spin-off character Savage Henry, guitarist for the Bugtown band the Bulldaggers, ended up with his own series, published from 1987–1994.

The real-world experimental musician Conrad Schnitzler (of Tangerine Dream and Kluster) was a regular guest in Those Annoying Post Bros., appearing in issues #2, 5, 42, 48, 50, and 63 (with cameos in issues #7, 16, and 41); and Annuals #1–2 (with a cameo In #3). In addition, the real-world avant-garde art collective The Residents appeared in Those Annoying Post Bros.: Stalking Ralph (Aeon Press, 1995).

== Publication history ==
The Post Brothers debuted in the early 1980s in Heavy Metal magazine, and their adventures were serialized there for a number of issues. In 1985, Vortex Comics began publishing Those Annoying Post Bros. It ran for 18 issues until 1990. In 1991, the title was taken over by Rip Off Press, which published an additional 20 issues until 1994.

MU Press's Aeon imprint picked up the title from 1994–1998, publishing 25 more issues, for a total of 63 issues. During this period, Aeon also published three Those Annoying Post Bros. annuals, from 1995-1997.

Sometime later, Howarth produced three additional Post Bros. one-shot comics, Targets, Sidewinder Nights, and Paparazzi Punishment, all of which are available in PDF format via digital download on Howarth's website.

From 2004–2005, MU Press published Howarth's spin-off series, Bugtown, which ran for 6 issues.

In 1994 Aeon released Those Annoying Post Bros.: Das Loot, a trade paperback collecting Those Annoying Post Bros. issue #1-5. In 1995, Aeon released Those Annoying Post Bros.: Disturb the Neighbors, a trade paperback collecting Those Annoying Post Bros. issue #6-9.

Beginning in 2008, Howarth wrote a number of prose novels (with no illustrations) taking place in the Bugtown universe that also featured the Post Bros.

In 2011, Devil's Due Publishing released e-reader editions of Those Annoying Post Bros. Collected: Volume 1, which collected Those Annoying Post Bros. #1-4; and Those Annoying Post Bros. Collected: Volume 2, which collected issues #5–9.

== In other media ==
Two CDs by "Ron Post" were released:

- Head Wounds — 54 minutes of synthesizers, guns, and screams
- Ron Post: Road Kills (1993) — 58 minutes of electronic music inspired by events in Those Annoying Post Bros. issues #3 and #5 "recorded on the road in Ron's armored tank"

== Bibliography ==
- "Those Annoying Post Bros." ongoing storyline, Heavy Metal magazine (early 1980s) — later collected in Changes: A Psycho-Visual Novel (Tundra, 1992) ISBN 9781879450226
- WRAB: Pirate Television (Howski Studios, 1985) — spy thriller co-starring the Post Bros and M. Boche
- Those Annoying Post Bros. (18 issues, Vortex Comics, 1985–1990) — first few issues co-written with Lou Stathis
- The Savage Sword of Mike (Fandom House, 1988) — guest-stars Ron Post., 36 pp.
- Vigilante Rocker (Reflex magazine, early 1990s) — collected by Howarth with new material; stars Ron Post; 31 pp.
- Those Annoying Post Bros. (20 issues, Rip Off Press, 1991–1994)
- Those Annoying Post Bros. (25 issues, MU Press/Aeon, 1994–1998)
- (with Lou Stathis) Those Annoying Post Bros.: Stalking Ralph (Aeon Press, 1995) ISBN 978-1883847265 — the Post Bros. are hired to kill The Residents
- Those Annoying Post Bros. annuals (MU Press, 1995-1997)
- Targets (self-published) — 26 pp.
- Sidewinder Nights (self-published) — 24 pp.
- Paparazzi Punishment (self-published) — 25 pp.
- Post-Mortem (self-published) — collection of short strips, 64 pp.
- Bugtown novels:
  - Secondhead Godhead (2008) — featuring Caroline, the Post Bros and Savage Henry; 202 pp.
  - Induced Labor (c. 2009) — the Post Bros kidnap a baby deity; 184 pp.
  - Poisonous Circles (c. 2010) — 2 short stories and a novella; featuring the Post Bros and Savage Henry; 165 pp.
  - Sneakernet (c. 2011) — featuring the Post Bros and Savage Henry; 182 pp.
