= Texas History Movies =

1920s newspaper comic strip

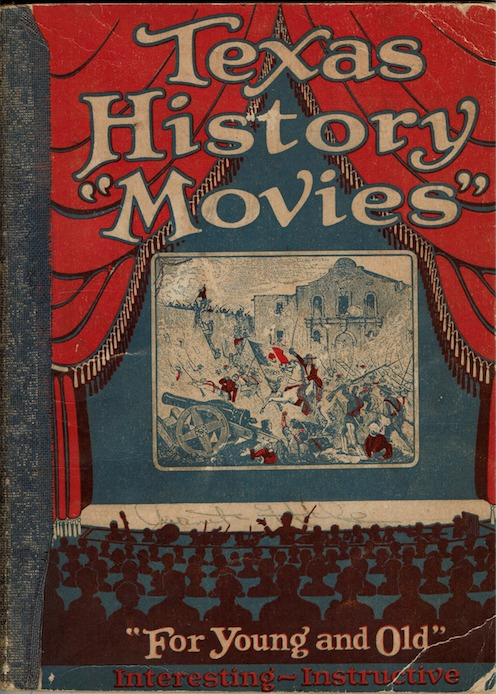
The cover to the 1928 edition of Texas History Movies, which was given out to schoolchildren in Texas

Texas History Movies was a comic strip with text by John Rosenfield, Jr., and pictures by Jack Patton that first ran in the Dallas Morning News in the 1920s offering historical stories about Texas. Reflecting the times, historians have characterized it as a "popular racist comic strip that ran in The Dallas Morning News in the late 1920s".

Book collections of the strip were published starting in 1928. For decades, paperback collections of the strip were underwritten by oil companies (first Magnolia Petroleum Company and then Mobil Oil) and distributed for free to Texas schoolchildren.

A completely new version by "counter-cultural artist, author, and self-made historian" Jack Jackson (Jaxon), entitled New Texas History Movies, was published by the Texas State Historical Association in 2007 (ISBN 978-0876112236) and won the 2008 Best Western Graphic Novel award from True West Magazine. It was Jackson's last work before his death in June 2006.
