= Ted McKeever =

American writer and artist

Ted McKeever is an American writer and artist who worked in the comic book industry from 1986 until 2016. After completing his semi-autobiographical series Pencil Head, he walked away from the industry for good.

== Bibliography ==
- Transit (Vortex Comics, 1986)
- Eddy Current (Mad Dog Graphics, 1987–1988)
- Plastic Forks (Marvel Comics, 1989–1990)
- Metropol (Marvel Comics, 1991–1992)
- Metropol A.D. (Marvel Comics, 1993)
- Industrial Gothic (DC Comics, 1995)
- Junk Culture (DC Comics, 1997)
- Faith (DC Comics, 1999–2000)
- Meta4 (Shadowline, 2010–2011)
- Mondo (Shadowline, 2011–2012)
- Miniature Jesus (Shadowline, 2013)
- The Superannuated Man (Shadowline, 2014–2015)
- Pencil Head (Shadowline, 2016)

=== Other comics work ===
- untitled one-pager in Strip AIDS U.S.A. (Last Gasp, 1988)
- (with writer Dave Gibbons) "Survivor," in A1 #1 (Atomeka Press, 1989)
- "The Talk of Creatures," in A1 #2 (Atomeka Press, 1989)
- (with writer Peter Milligan) The Extremist (Vertigo, 1993)
- (with writer Rachel Pollack) Doom Patrol #75–79, 81–82, 84–87 (Vertigo, 1994–1995)
- "Engines" in Batman: Legends of the Dark Knight #74–75 (DC Comics, 1995)
- "Perpetual Mourning" in Batman Black and White #1 (DC Comics, 1996)
- (with writers Randy Lofficier, & Jean-Marc Lofficier) Superman's Metropolis (DC Elseworlds, 1997)
- (with writer Lydia Lunch) Toxic Gumbo (Vertigo, 1998)
- (with writers Randy Lofficier & Jean-Marc Lofficier) Batman: Nosferatu (DC Elseworlds, 1999)
- "A Life Less Empty," in The Matrix Comics Series 1 (WB Publishing, 1999)
- "Grave Wisdom," in Flinch #14 (Vertigo, 2000)
- "The King of Never Return," in The Matrix Comics Series 2 (WB Publishing, 2000)
- (with writer Keron Grant) "Day In... Day Out", in The Matrix Comics Series 2 (WB Publishing, 2000)
- "Memories of Green," in Marvel Knights Double Shot (Marvel Knights, 2002)
- (with writer Brian Michael Bendis) Ultimate Marvel Team-Up #12–13 (Marvel Comics, 2002)
- Spider-Man's Tangled Web #18 (Marvel Comics, 2002)
- (with writers Randy Lofficier & Jean-Marc Lofficier) Wonder Woman: The Blue Amazon (DC Elseworlds, 2003)
- (with writer Joe Kelly) Enginehead (DC, 2004)
- (with writer Steve Niles ) Little Book of Horror: War of the Worlds (IDW Publishing, 2005)
- (with writer F. Paul Wilson) "Cuts," in Doomed #1 (IDW, 2006)
- (with writer Joe Harris) "Dr. Locrian's Asylum," The Nightmare Factory (Fox Atomic Comics, 2007)
- "Morgue Amore," in Legion of Monsters #1 (Marvel Comics, 2007)
- (inspired by Tori Amos' Under the Pink) "Past The Mission," Comic Book Tattoo (Image Comics, 2008)
- "Modern Primitive," in Rampaging Wolverine #1 (Marvel Comics, 2009)
- "Breakfast All Day," in Astonishing Tales #1 (Marvel Comics, 2009)
- "So This Is How It Feels...," in The Mystic Hands of Dr. Strange #1 (Marvel Comics, 2010)
- "Bonebomb Babylon," in Savage Axe of Ares #1 (Marvel Comics, 2010)
