= Terminal City (comics) =

Comic book limited series

- Cover of the 1st issue of the initial series.

Publication information
- Publisher: Vertigo (imprint of DC Comics)
- No. of issues: 9 (first series), 5 (second series)

Creative team
- Written by: Dean Motter
- Artist(s): Michael Lark

Collected editions
- Collected Edition: ISBN 1-56389-391-6

Terminal City is the name for two comic book limited series published by DC Comics under their Vertigo imprint in 1996 and 1997, with, respectively nine and five issues. Dean Motter was the writer and Michael Lark was the artist for the series.

== Collected editions ==
The first series was collected in a 1997 paperback book titled Terminal City, ISBN 1-56389-391-6. Dark Horse Comics released a new Collected Edition called The Compleat Terminal City, containing both stories in March 2012.

== Awards ==
Terminal City was a top vote-getter for the Comics Buyer's Guide Fan Award for Favorite Limited Series for 1997. The second series, Terminal City: Aerial Graffiti was a top vote-getter for the same award for 1998.
