= Lou Stathis =

American author, critic and editor (1952–1997)

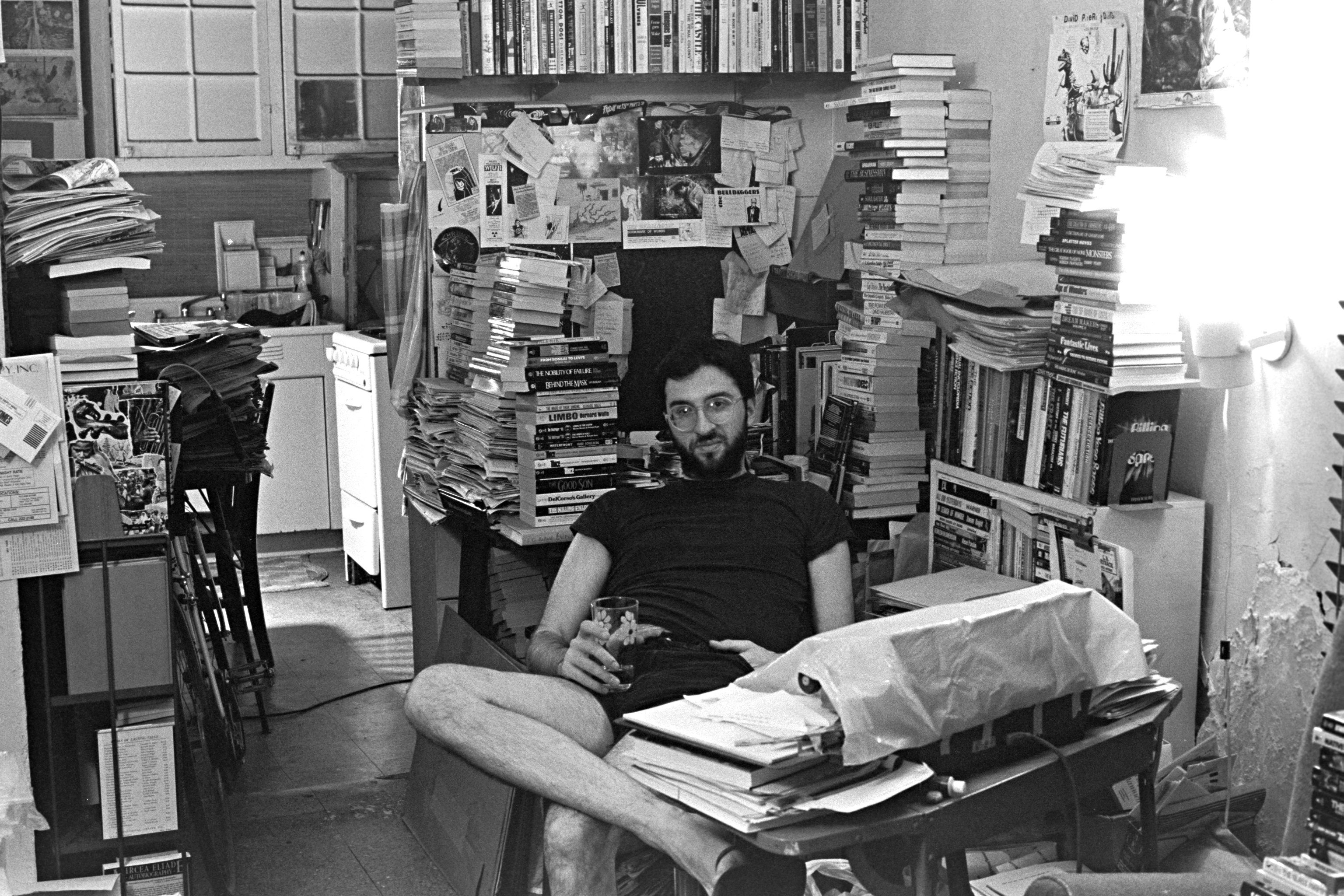
- Lou Stathis in his New York City rooftop apartment, summer 1986. Photo by Jeff Schalles.
- Born: September 29, 1952
- Died: May 4, 1997 (aged 44)
- Areas: Writer, Editor
- Awards: International Horror Guild Award, 1997

Kyle Baker's portrait of Lou Stathis at work.

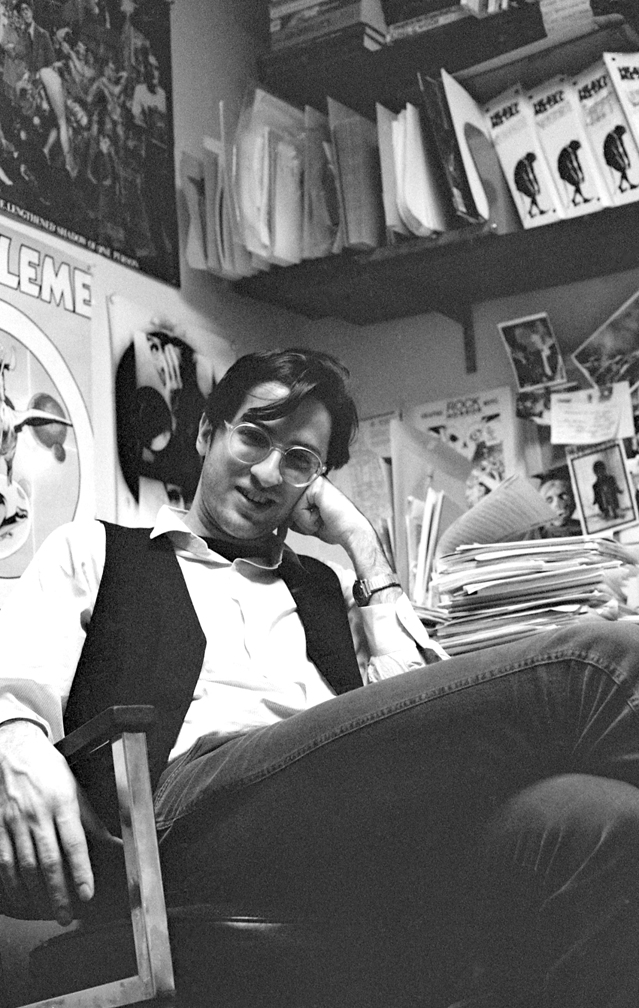
Lou Stathis in his office at Heavy Metal magazine, mid 1980's, photo by Jeff Schalles

Louis J. Stathis (September 29, 1952 – May 4, 1997) was an American author, critic and editor, mainly in the areas of fantasy and science fiction. During the last four years of his life he was an editor for DC Comics' Vertigo line, working on such titles as Preacher, Doom Patrol, Industrial Gothic, Peter Kuper's The System, and Dhampire.

== Work ==
Stathis was a columnist and editor for Heavy Metal and a columnist for Ted White's Fantastic magazine; during the late 1970s and early 1980s, he also wrote a monthly column on contemporary popular music for Gallery magazine. He worked as an editor for Ace Books, High Times and Reflex magazine.

Stathis collaborated with cartoonist Matt Howarth, co-writing the first few issues of Those Annoying Post Bros., published by Vortex Comics in 1985. In 1989, Stathis wrote The Venus Interface (originally advertised as Interzone: The Wild & Curious Times of Sheldon Zone), a Heavy Metal graphic novel with a cover by Olivia De Berardinis and interior art by Jim Fletcher, Rick Geary, Peter Kuper, Mark Pacella, Kenneth Smith, Arthur Suydam and Michael Uman.

In writing and editing, Stathis took a prismatic approach, noting popular culture linkages:

"I see connections between all vital forms of popular art. At Heavy Metal and Reflex, we would feature side-by-side profiles of guys like Tom Waits, Captain Beefheart, The Residents, Sun Ra, Voivod, Ice Cube, Francis Coppola, David Cronenberg, Susan Sontag (by Samuel R. Delany), James Ellroy (by Lewis Shiner), Kathy Acker, Neil Gaiman (who also interviewed Lou Reed for us), Alan Moore, Moebius, Brian Bolland, and Dave McKean––as if they all deserved commensurate attention (they do). The idea was––and still is––that it's all in the mix, and to erect barriers between, say, comics and music, to ignore the noise from any part of the system, is counterproductive and just plain stupid. Most of the artists and writers I know listen to and take inspiration from music while they work. Most of the musicians I know read comics and get off on the imagery. There's an intense, cross-cultural/media conversation going on, and all you have to do to hear it is stop listening selectively."

While he was an editor at Vertigo, Stathis began having headaches that kept him from working. He died of respiratory failure ten months after being diagnosed with a brain tumor.

== Awards ==
In June 1997, he received a special award from the International Horror Guild.

== See also ==
- List of notable brain tumor patients
