= Industrial Gothic =

- Cover of the first issue

Publication information
- Publisher: DC Comics
- Schedule: Monthly
- Format: Limited series
- Genre: Science fiction
- Publication date: December 1995 - April 1996
- No. of issues: 5

Creative team
- Created by: Ted McKeever
- Written by: Ted McKeever
- Artist(s): Ted McKeever
- Letterer(s): John Workman
- Colorist(s): Ted McKeever
- Editor(s): Axel Alonso; Lou Stathis

Industrial Gothic is a five-issue creator-owned comic book limited series written and illustrated by Ted McKeever. It was published in 1995 by DC's Vertigo imprint, edited by Lou Stathis.

== Story ==
Pencil and Nickel are two inmates of a prison in a dystopian society in which ugliness is a crime. Pencil was born in the prison; Nickel is incarcerated there because she has no arms or legs. They decide to escape, in order to find a semi-mythical place called The Aluminium Tower, in which everyone is accepted no matter what they look like.
