= Colin Upton =

Canadian cartoonist and artist (born 1960)

- Born: April 2, 1960 (age 66) Winnipeg, Manitoba, Canada
- Area: Cartoonist

Colin Upton (born April 2, 1960) is a Canadian cartoonist and artist who was born in Winnipeg, Manitoba and grew up in Vancouver, British Columbia. Many of his comics are self-published in the minicomic format, although he has also had his work issued by commercial publishers such as Fantagraphics Books and included in anthology collections such as Drippytown Comics & Stories. He is a co-host of the Inkstuds radio program, broadcast on CITR-FM at the University of British Columbia in Vancouver.

Since the mid-1980s, Upton has performed numerous times as a member of GX Jupitter-Larsen's noise band/performance art troupe The Haters. Upton's Happy Hater minicomics are based on the group's concepts and ideas.

== Bibliography (selected) ==
- Colin Upton's Big Thing (Ed Varney, 1990)
- Colin Upton's Other Big Thing (Fantagraphics, 1991)
- Colin Upton's Big Black Thing (Starhead Comix, 1994)
- Buddha on the Road (Aeon Publications, 1995–1997)
- The Totimorphous (Side-Show News & Co, 2006)
- 9-11
- Colin Upton Comics
- Famous Bus Rides
- The Granville Street Gallery
- The Happy Hater
- Happy Ned
- Real Rubbie Comix
- Self-indulgent Comics
- Socialist Turtle
- Colin Cthulhu
- Diabetes Funnies
- Post-Modern Mini-Comics
- Two-Fisted Tales of Tea
- Confessions of a Tabletop General
- Canadian History Mini-Comics
