= Feds 'N' Heads (board game) =

1971 board game

- Box cover of Rip Off Press edition, 1971
- Designers: Gilbert Shelton
- Publishers: Playboy Press; Rip Off Press
- Publication: 1971
- Genres: Counterculture

Feds 'N' Heads is a board game published by Playboy Press and Rip Off Press in 1971 that is based on the identically titled underground comic by Gilbert Shelton.

== Description ==
Feds 'N' Heads is a basic "roll the dice and move" game. Players all start on the Home square, where they each collect $50. They then move around the board, trying to land exactly on places where they can buy a "lid" (1 ounce) of "weed" (marijuana) while avoiding the card-drawing squares "Burns, Busts, Bummers & Rip-Offs" and "Weird Trips". Sample cards from these squares include "You smoke an entire lid of grass, get monstrously hungry, and spend $25 at the Delicatessen" and ""You get paranoid and flush five lids down the john. This will cost you $25 for the Roto-Rooter man."

Players must return to the Home square to get more money, and can stash their weed there as well to avoid losing it to other players or cards.

The illustrations on the game board are by Shelton, using a style developed for his 1968 one-shot comic called Feds 'N' Heads and further developed in his Fabulous Furry Freak Brothers comic.

=== Victory conditions ===
The winner is the first player to collect 35 lids (equal to 1 "key"/1 kilo) and then return to the Home square.

== Publication history ==
Playboy Press published Feds 'N' Heads as a free pull-out game in the September 1971 edition of Playboy Magazine. Shelton's publishing company, Rip Off Press, released a boxed set.

== Reception ==
In Issue 49 of the British magazine Perfidious Albion, Charles Vasey commented, "It's all basic game stuff with tricks and treats, and cards you keep to ward off other cards, and cards you play on other gamers (heh, heh) but its also fast and fun, and the cards are genuinely funny." Vasey liked the game board, writing, "The map illustrations are Shelton at his best (and in full colour it is one hell of a lot better than most commercial boardgames) and include many of the characters that have appeared in the comix over the years." Vasey concluded, "It's a simple but flavoursome game which I would recommend for play with novices or where you want to unwind, it is recommended that you know your comix and read High Times and Rolling Stone. Some may object to the subject matter — after all drugs kill, which is more than war does. Kin you dig it?"

Writing for Dangerous Minds, Oliver Hall noted, ""Even if Feds 'n' Heads did not bear a striking resemblance to Monopoly — in place of the Chance and Community Chest cards, for example, there are "Weird Trips" and "Burns, Busts, Bummers & Ripoffs" piles — the game would still be inviting to the resin-smudged and short-term memory impaired, not to mention the resin-smudged. Its rules are simple and few."
