= Spyscape =

New York City espionage museum

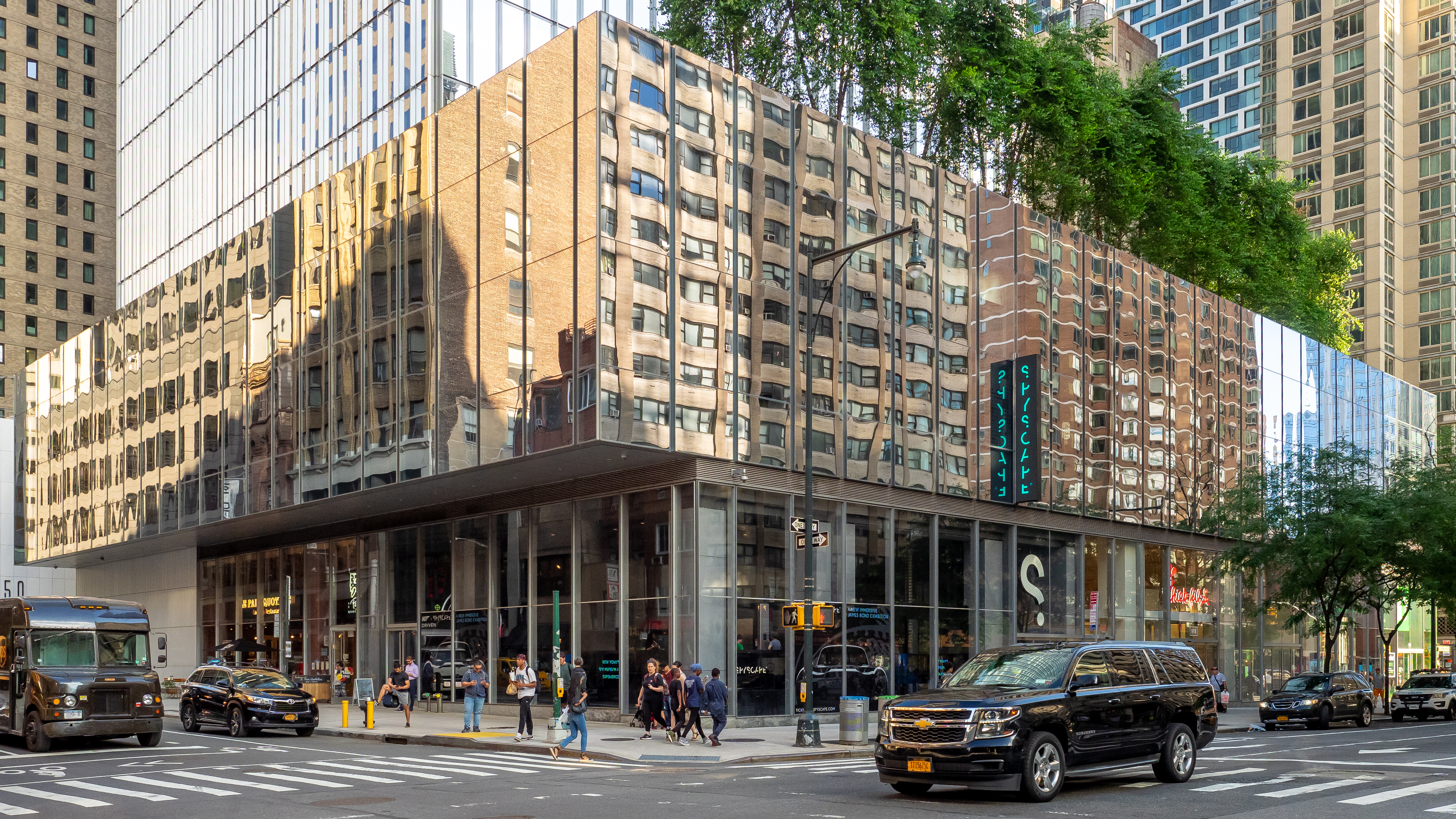

- Location within the United States Location within New York
- Established: February 16, 2018
- Location: 928 8th Ave, New York, NY 10019
- Coordinates: 40°45′55″N 73°59′01″W
- Type: For-Profit Spy Museum
- Website: spyscape.com

Spyscape (styled in all caps) is a contemporary entertainment and education brand focused on secrets. Spyscape's physical HQ in New York City is a 60,000-square-foot interactive museum created by London-based private investment group Archimedia and designed by Sir David Adjaye.

Spyscape HQ has seven main gallery zones: Encryption, which focuses on the cryptanalysts who cracked the German Enigma machine in WWII; Deception, which takes visitors through the FBI's hunt for KGB mole Robert Hanssen; Surveillance, a 360-degree room that presents a closer look at Edward Snowden; Hacking, highlighting the Anonymous (group); Cyberwarfare, which focuses on Stuxnet; Special Ops, which focuses on WWII spy gadgets and SOE Officer Virginia Hall; and Intelligence, which examines the how espionage and analysis shaped the Cuban Missile Crisis.

Visitors have the opportunity to test their own skills with various 'challenges' throughout the galleries - assessing traits from empathy and agility, to personality, brain power, and risk tolerance. The final gallery is Debrief, where visitors receive the results of their tests and challenges, and are assigned a spy role.

2024 saw Spyscape launch SPYGAMES - an all-new experience designed to activate visitors' mental and physical powers in active games designed with experts from CIA & Special Ops.

The previous installation before SPYGAMES was Batman x Spyscape, an interactive adventure that tested visitors’ detective skills through a combination of a series of immersive physical spaces and a dedicated app for smartphones.

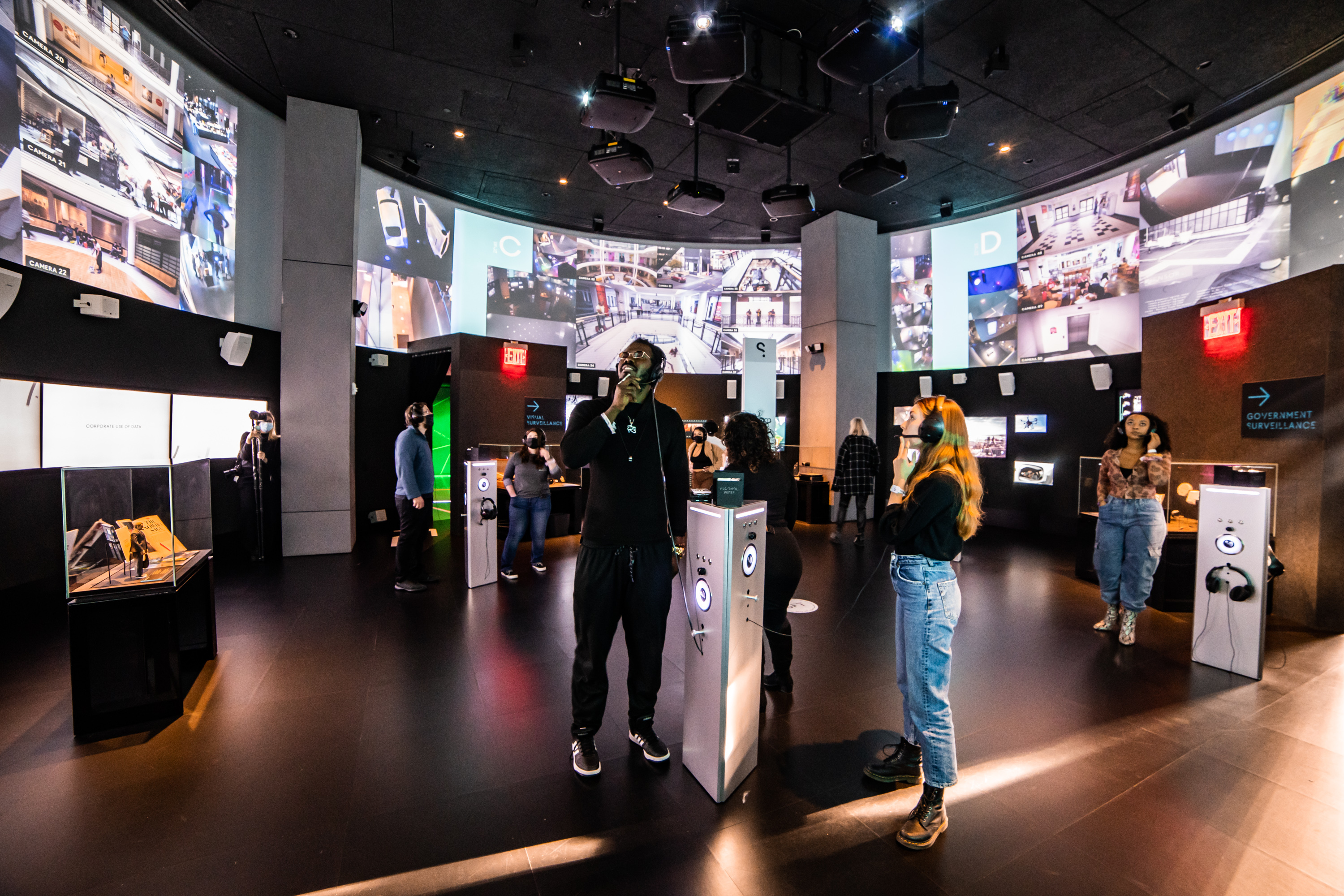
Spyscape HQ in 2022

Driven: 007 x Spyscape was the first official James Bond exhibit in New York City - opened between 2019 and 2022 in Spyscape's south gallery. The focal point of the exhibit is the actual Aston Martin DB5 that was driven by Pierce Brosnan in the film GoldenEye. In response to the COVID-19 pandemic, Spyscape made the 007 x Spyscape exhibition available for free online following the temporary closure of the NYC venue.

In April 2020, Spyscape launched a podcast network. The first show, True Spies, narrated by Hayley Atwell and Vanessa Kirby, provides a unique insight into the world of secrets through interviews with professional spies. November 2022 saw Loki star Sophia Di Martino take over as host for the new series of True Spies, with the new series launching with "The Bin Laden Files".
