= Savage Henry =

Comic book series

- The cover of Savage Henry #1 (Vortex Comics, January 1987), artwork by Matt Howarth.

Publication information
- Publisher: Vortex Comics (January 1987–April 1990); Rip Off Press (1990–1993); Caliber Press (1994); MU Press (2004)
- Publication date: 1987-1994, 2004
- No. of issues: (vol. 1) 30 (vol. 2) 3
- Main character(s): Savage Henry; The Bulldaggers numerous real musicians

Creative team
- Created by: Matt Howarth
- Written by: Matt Howarth
- Artist: Matt Howarth

Savage Henry is the title of a comic book series written and illustrated by Matt Howarth. The stories center on Savage Henry, lead guitarist of the "insect rock" band the Bulldaggers. Howarth regularly drew "guest appearances" by real-world musicians in the comic book, including The Residents, Moby, Foetus, Hawkwind, and Nash the Slash.

== Publication history ==
The character of Savage Henry first appeared in Howarth's 1977 self-published (Howski Studios) series Rock Horror, which appeared in 1979.

The Savage Henry ongoing series was originally published by Vortex Comics, which released 13 issues from 1987 to 1990. The title was picked up, continuing the numbering, by Rip Off Press in 1990, which published an additional 17 issues until 1993.

Caliber Press published 3 issues of Savage Henry volume 2 in 1994; they also published the three-issue limited series Savage Henry: Headstrong that same year.

MU Press picked up Savage Henry in 2004, publishing the three-issue limited series Powerchords and the one-shot Puppet Trap.

== Musicians featured in Savage Henry ==
- Ash Ra Tempel — in Caroline: Circles vs. Squares
- David Borden of Mother Mallard's Portable Masterpiece Company — in Savage Henry issues #2 and #5
- Michael Chocholak — in issues #17–19
- Foetus (a.k.a. Clint Ruin) — in issue #23
- Ron Geesin — in Headstrong #1
- Manuel Göttsching — in Caroline: Circles vs. Squares
- Peter Gulch of Nightcrawlers) — in issue #20
- Hawkwind — in issue #26
- The Hood — in issues #9–11
- Barney Jones of Mars Everywhere — in issues #18-19
- Moby — in Savage Henry vol. 2, #2
- David Lee Myers (a.k.a. Arcane Device) — in issues #18-22
- Nash the Slash — in issues #2-7 (and The Contaminated Zone #3 [Brave New Worlds, 1991])
- Richard Pinhas (a.k.a. Heldon) — in Savage Henry vol. 2, #3
- David Prescott — in issues #18-20
- The Residents — in issue #2, 5, 6, 18–20 (they also appeared in Those Annoying Post Bros.: Stalking Ralph [Aeon Press, 1995])
- Steve Roach — in issues #17-19
- Conrad Schnitzler of Tangerine Dream and Kluster — in issues #1–4, 7,–13, 16, 23–24, 28–30; and vol. 2, #1, and #3 (Schnitzler also appeared in Those Annoying Post Bros. #2, 5, 42, 48, 50, 63, and annuals #1-2 [with cameos In Post Bros issues #7, 16, 41, and annual #3]; Con & C'thulu: Uberdub [MU Press, 1996]; The two Con & C’thulu books; a cameo In Caroline: Circles Vs Squares; and Data Core [1998])
- Klaus Schulze — in issue #27 (and Caroline: Circles vs. Squares [Aeon Press, 1998])
- Chuck Van Zyl of Xisle — in issue #20
- Andrew Weiss of Scornflakes, Gone, and the Henry Rollins Band — in issues #2-7, 16

== Bibliography ==
- (vol. 1) Savage Henry (13 issues, Vortex Comics, January 1987–April 1990)
- (vol. 1) Savage Henry (17 issues, Rip Off Press, 1990–1993)
- (vol. 2) Savage Henry (3 issues, Caliber Press, 1994)
- Savage Henry: Headstrong (3 issues, Caliber, 1994)
- Caroline: Circles vs. Squares (Aeon Press, 1998) ISBN 978-1883847326 — co-stars Savage Henry; 80 pp.
- Data Core (self-published, 1998) — complete Bulldaggers discography, with art by Howarth; 64pp.
- Savage Henry: Powerchords (3 issues, MU Press, 2004)
- Savage Henry: Puppet Trap (MU Press, 2004)
- Gaia Symptoma (self-published) — co-starring Savage Henry and Loop Guru, 64 pp.
