= Rip Off Press =

Comic book mail order retailer and distributor

- Founded: 1969
- Founders: Fred Todd, Dave Moriaty, Gilbert Shelton, Jack Jackson
- Headquarters location: San Francisco (1969–1987); Auburn, California (1987–present)
- Publication types: Comics
- Nonfiction topics: Politics, Recreational drugs
- Fiction genres: Underground comix
- Imprints: Iguana Comics (changed to Magnecom in 1993)
- Official website: www.ripoffpress.com

Rip Off Press Inc. is a comic book mail order retailer and distributor, better known as the former publisher of adult-themed series like The Fabulous Furry Freak Brothers and Rip Off Comix, as well as many other seminal publications from the underground comix era. Founded in 1969 in San Francisco by four friends from Austin, Texas — cartoonists Gilbert Shelton and Jack Jackson, and Fred Todd and Dave Moriaty — Rip Off Press is now run in Auburn, California, by Todd.

Rip Off Press is notable for being the first company to publish the fourth edition of the Principia Discordia, a Discordian religious text written by Gregory Hill and Kerry Thornley. It was also an early publisher of a booklet on drug manufacturing, Psychedelic Chemistry.

== History ==
=== Origins ===
In January 17, 1969, the company was founded in San Francisco by four Texans: Fred Todd, Dave Moriaty, and cartoonists Gilbert Shelton and Jack Jackson. The initial plan was to print rock band promotional posters on an old press and do comics on the side — in some ways the company was formed as a sort of cartoonists' cooperative, as an alternative publishing venue to other Bay Area publishers like Apex Novelties and Print Mint. The four men purchased a used Davidson 233 offset printing press and set up shop in the same space as Apex Novelties, located on the third-floor ballroom of the former Mowry's Opera House, at 633 Laguna Street in Hayes Valley.

The first comics Rip Off Press published, in 1969, were R. Crumb's Big Ass Comics (June '69), a reprint of Jaxon's God Nose (originally published in 1964), Jaxon's Happy Endings Comics (August '69), and the first issue of Fred Schrier and Dave Sheridan's Mother's Oats Comix (October '69).

After a fire almost destroyed the opera house in late 1969, Rip Off moved to the decaying former headquarters of the Family Dog psychedelic rock music promotion collective (which Jaxon had been a member of starting in 1966). Rip Off Press was located at 1250 17th Street in San Francisco from 1970 until 1985.

By 1972, the poster printing business had faded away and the company had become a publishing house. Other works the company published during this period included comics by Frank Stack, Sheridan (all co-published with Gary Arlington's San Francisco Comic Book Company), The Rip Off Review of Western Culture omnibus, and Shelton's The Fabulous Furry Freak Brothers. The company also published a board game, Feds 'N' Heads, that was based on Shelton's 1968 identically named comic.

=== Changing times ===
As the underground comix market began to peter out in the early 1970s, Rip Off Press shifted its focus to other cartoonists and other comics. By this point, Rip Off Press co-founders Moriaty and Jackson had gone back to Texas, leaving the running of the company to Shelton and Todd.

The company started a syndication service, managed by Shelton, that sold weekly content to alternative newspapers and student publications. Each Friday, the company sent out a distribution sheet with the strips it was selling, by such cartoonists as Shelton, Joel Beck, Dave Sheridan, Ted Richards, Bill Griffith, and Harry Driggs (as R. Diggs). The Rip Off Press Syndicate, never really a profitable operation, was discontinued by 1979. (Griffith's Zippy, which had debuted in 1976 as a weekly strip with Rip Off's syndicate, was picked up for daily syndication in 1986 by King Features Syndicate.) Much of the material produced for the syndicate was eventually published in the company's long-running anthology Rip Off Comix, which had debuted in 1977.

In 1979, Universal Studios paid Shelton and Rip Off Press $250,000 for the rights to make a live-action Fabulous Furry Freak Brothers film. Rip Off used its share of the rights fees to buy a new typesetting machine and a computer system, which enabled it in turn to launch the mail order business that later became integral to the company's survival. (The Universal-produced Freak Brothers film never made it to production.)

The future Kathe Todd, who first came to the company in 1975 for a college summer job, married co-founder Fred Todd in 1980; by the mid-1980s she had assumed co-management of the company.

Cartoonist Jay Kinney joined the company as an editor in 1981, but left after a few months. Cartoonist Guy Colwell began freelancing for Rip Off Press in the production department beginning in 1980; he worked on-and-off for the company through c. 1990.

After bouncing back and forth between Europe and the Bay Area in the late 1970s and early 1980s (thanks to the money he received from Universal), co-founder Shelton and his wife permanently relocated to France in 1984.

In mid-1985, the company moved from 17th Street to a smaller space on San Jose Avenue near the city's southern border, with warehouse space across town at the Bayview Industrial Park. This three-story, block-square building, which housed over a hundred other businesses, burned to the ground on April 6, 1986, following an explosion in an illegal fireworks factory in the basement.

=== Relocation to Auburn ===
Freed of a 17-year accumulation of comics and other paraphernalia, Fred Todd (at this point the only original partner still working in the business) decided to relocate Rip Off Press to Auburn, California (part of the Sacramento metropolitan area), where he and Kathe continued to run the company while raising their two small children. The move was made in June 1987.

During this era, Rip Off Press continued to publish Shelton's The Fabulous Furry Freak Brothers and the Rip Off Comix anthology; the popularity of erotic comics in the late 1980s/early 1990s led to the publication of such titles as Strips by Chuck Austen, The Girl by Kevin J. Taylor, Doll by Guy Colwell, and SS Crompton's Demi the Demoness.

The company published two music-related indy comics titles by Matt Howarth — Savage Henry and Those Annoying Post Bros., from 1989 to 1994. Rip Off Press also took over the publication of the long-running all-female underground anthology Wimmen's Comix with issue #14 (1989) of that title, publishing it through 1993.

=== Shift from publishing to retailing ===
After the collapse of the direct market in the early 1990s (fueled by Marvel Comics' withdrawal of its 40% market share from the distribution system), Rip Off Press began cutting costs and gradually retreated from publishing.

By 1997, it had shifted its business to selling backlist comics in its store and to mail-order customers, plus to the fans finding them online. The Todds moved the business to much smaller quarters adjoining their home in 1999, where they continue to sell comics, mostly through the company website.

The website was disabled for a time in 2011–2012, during which time it was completely redesigned and a large number of collector's items (including historic ad pieces, rare press sheets, publisher's overlay proofs from the company's publishing history, and more) were added to its offerings.

== Selected titles and artists ==
=== Syndication service strips ===
- Cartoon Cavalcade by Joel Beck
- Dealer McDope by Dave Sheridan
- E.Z. Wolf by Ted Richards
- The Fabulous Furry Freak Brothers by Gilbert Shelton
- Fat Freddy's Cat by Gilbert Shelton
- Forty Year Old Hippie by Ted Richards
- Griffith Observatory by Bill Griffith
- Mom Squad by Harry Driggs (as R. Diggs)
- Motoring Tips by Gilbert Shelton
- Nerds by Dave Sheridan
- Wonder Wart-Hog by Gilbert Shelton with Tony Bell and Joe E. Brown, Jr.
- Zippy by Bill Griffith (from 1976)

=== Comics ===
- Anthologies:
  - Rip Off Comix (30 issues, 1977–1991)
  - The Rip Off Review of Western Culture (3 issues, 1972) — edited by Dave Moriaty
  - Wimmen's Comix (4 issues, 1989–1992)
- Chuck Austen: Strips (1989–1991)
- Guy Colwell:
  - Doll (8 issues, 1989–1992)
  - Central Body: The Art of Guy Colwell (1991)
- SS Crompton: Demi the Demoness (1993–1997)
- Robert Crumb:
  - Big Ass Comics (2 issues, 1969–1971)
  - R. Crumb's Comics and Stories (1969) — features 10-page Fritz the Cat story drawn in 1964
  - Motor City Comics (2 issues, 1969–1970)
- Harry Driggs (as R. Diggs)
  - Great Diggs of '77: a Cartoonists View of 1977 from the Pages of the Rip Off Comix Syndicate, the Berkeley Barb and the Ag-Biz Tiller (64 pp, 1977) — political cartoons
  - Great Diggs II: a Cartoonist's View of World Events, Compiled from the Pages of the Rip Off Comix Syndicate (36 pp., 1979) — political cartoons
  - Greatest Diggs of All Time (Rip Off Press, 1991) — collecting material from various anthologies
  - The Life and Loves of Cleopatra (1991) — censored version of Driggs' pornographic comic, originally published in 1967
- Larry Gonick: Cartoon History of the Universe (9 issues, 1978–1992)
- Matt Howarth:
  - Savage Henry (17 issues, 1990–1993)
  - Those Annoying Post Bros. (20 issues, 1991–1994)
- Carol Lay: Good Girls (1991)
- Gilbert Shelton:
  - The Fabulous Furry Freak Brothers (13 issues, 1971–1997)
  - Fat Freddy's Cat (12 issues, 1977–1993)
  - Wonder Wart-Hog (1973–1975)
  - Not Quite Dead (5 issues, 1993–1995)
- Dave Sheridan:
  - Mother's Oats Comix (1970–1976)— with Fred Schrier and others
  - Skull Comics #1 (1970) — with Fred Schrier and others; later picked up by Last Gasp
  - The Balloon Vendor (1971)— with Fred Schrier
- Frank Stack:
  - Jesus Comics (3 issues, 1969–1972)
  - Feelgood Funnies (2 issues, 1972, 1984)
  - Amazon Comics (1972)
  - Dorman's Doggie (1979)
- Kevin J. Taylor:
  - Model by Day (1990)
  - The Girl (1991)
