= Mister X (Vortex) =

Series of comic books

- Cover of issue #2 illustrated by Paul Rivoche

Publication information
- Publisher: Vortex Comics
- Schedule: Monthly
- Format: Standard
- Publication date: (Series 1) June 1984 - August 1988 (Series 2) April 1989 - March 1990 (Series 3) 1996 Caliber Comics (Series 4) 2008–2009 Dark Horse Comics
- No. of issues: (Series 1) 14 (Series 2) 13 (Series 3) 4 (Series 4) 4

Creative team
- Created by: Dean Motter
- Written by: (Series 1) Jaime Hernandez; Gilbert Hernandez; Mario Hernandez; Dean Motter (Series 2) Jeffrey Morgan (Series 3) Deborah Marks (Series 4) Dean Motter
- Penciller(s): Jaime Hernandez; Gilbert Hernandez; Paul Rivoche; Seth (Series 2) Shane Oakley; D'Israeli (Series 4) Dean Motter
- Inker(s): (Series 2) Ken Holewczynski (Series 4) Dean Motter

Mister X is a series of comic books first published in 1983–1990 by Canadian company Vortex Comics. Created by album and book cover designer Dean Motter, it was developed for a year in close collaboration with comic artist and illustrator Paul Rivoche, whose series of poster illustrations stirred up great interest in the project. The series published early work by comic artists who would later emerge as important alternative cartoonists, including Jaime Hernandez, Gilbert Hernandez, Mario Hernandez, Seth, Shane Oakley and D'Israeli.

In the early 1990s, a CD-ROM computer-animated version of Volume Two, issues seven and eight, was created by the now-defunct Kinetic Opera Company.

== Publication history ==
Dean Motter commented that he got the idea for Mister X when he was in college, where he was writing the journals, and was fascinated by the ideas of sleeplessness and somnambulism. Hardboiled detective stories and silent films were also an influence, and after privately working out details of the story and premise of Mister X for a year, Motter turned to Paul Rivoche to illustrate the work.

A highly successful promotional campaign with posters and ads followed for the next year, while Motter and Rivoche struggled to produce an actual issue of Mister X. When Rivoche quit, Vortex Comics president Bill Marks became more skeptical than ever that Motter would be able to produce the series on time, and decided to turn the work over to the Hernandez brothers. Sales suffered from the long delay; while orders for the originally scheduled shipping date of August 1983 exceeded 40,000 copies, they had dropped to 26,000 copies by the time Mister X #1 was actually published. The first four issues were written and illustrated by Jaime and Gilbert Hernandez, with additional writing by Mario Hernandez. They missed the deadlines for all but the first issue of the officially bimonthly series, but Bill Marks accepted their tardiness as a necessary consequence of producing a quality comic. The Hernandez brothers quit over payment delays from Vortex. Issues 5 through 14 of the series were then written by Motter, with issues 6 through 13 illustrated by Seth.

After the first volume of the Motter-based series ended in 1985, a second 12-issue black-and-white series concluding the saga was written by Jeffrey Morgan. The first six issues were penciled by Shane Oakley, and the remaining six by D'Israeli with inks by Ken Holewczynski.

Although a 13th issue of Volume II was published, beginning a story by Seth (writing as "Wilbur Webb") the rest of the story remained unpublished until it appeared in New Worlds Anthology. In 1996, Caliber Comics published Volume 3, a four-issue story by Deborah Marks.

The character reappeared in Motter's Electropolis mini-series from Image Comics in 2001–03. Motter's Vortex issues, along with the covers by Michael Kaluta, Bill Sienkiewicz, Howard Chaykin, Dave McKean, and others, were reprinted in Mister X: The Definitive Collection (Volumes I and II) from iBooks in 2005.

In 2008, Dark Horse Comics published a hardcover book titled Mister X: The Archives, collecting the Volume I run along with additional material including an introduction by Warren Ellis (Transmetropolitan), and a thesis written by Volume II writer Morgan. In 2011, they later published a hardcover collection of Volume II #1–#12, Mister X Special #1, and other stories as The Brides of Mister X and Other Stories.

The character was rebooted by Motter in the miniseries, Mister X: Condemned, first published on December 24, 2008 by Dark Horse. He appeared in Dark Horse Presents #12-14 (2012) and #33-35 (2014) and in two mini-series Mister X: Eviction #1-3 (2013) and Mister X: Razed #1-4 (2015).

== Series background ==
Set in Radiant City, a dystopian municipality influenced by Bauhaus and Fritz Lang's Metropolis, the series concerns a mysterious figure who purports to be its architect. His radical theories of "psychetecture" cause the citizenry to go mad, just as he did, and he takes on the mission to repair his creation.

To accomplish this he remains awake twenty-four hours a day by means of the drug "insomnalin", all the while coping with a Dick Tracy–like rogues gallery and supporting cast including his long-suffering ex-girlfriend Mercedes.

Mister X's influence can be seen and was acknowledged in films like Terry Gilliam's Brazil, Tim Burton's Batman, and Alex Proyas' Dark City.

== Characters ==
=== Mister X ===
The protagonist of the series, he claims to be one of the architects of the city and believes he must fix errors in its construction. He rarely sleeps, thanks to a drug he engineered. Though he claims himself to be various figures involved in the city's creation thorough the series, these always end up being aliases leaving his true identity and involvement a mystery.

=== Mercedes ===
Mister X's girlfriend, who knows him as "Santos", they meet at the "Ninth Academy", a type of remote hospital resort described by Mister X as "a place where those more than fed up with the world can truly have privacy".

=== Katsuda ===
A lawyer, she was Walter Eichmann's legal advisor before he left Radiant City.

=== Zamora ===
A ruthless gangster who runs the city's underworld with the support of corrupt city officials.

=== Walter Eichmann ===
One of the two architects of the city and the inventor of psycho-architecture.

=== Simon Myers ===
The second architect of Radiant City who designed, among other things, the robots programmed to assist citizens.

=== Pierre Radiquet ===
The chemist who developed "insomnalin", among other miracle drugs.

=== Consuelo ===
Walter Eichmann's ex-wife, a wealthy socialite.

=== Reinhardt ===
A brilliant but corrupt woman who takes over Eichmann's position after he leaves.

=== Madame Friedkin ===
Wealthy owner of a pharmaceutical company.
