= Feds 'N' Heads =

Underground comic book by Gilbert Shelton

- Feds 'N' Heads (1968), first printing; artwork by Gilbert Shelton.

Publication information
- Publisher: (1st printing) Gilbert Shelton (subsequent printings) Print Mint
- Format: Standard
- Genre: Underground superhero parody
- Publication date: 1968
- No. of issues: 1
- Main character(s): Wonder Wart-Hog; The Fabulous Furry Freak Brothers

Creative team
- Created by: Gilbert Shelton
- Written by: Gilbert Shelton, Lieuen Adkins
- Artist: Gilbert Shelton

Feds 'N' Heads is an underground comic book, created and self-published by Gilbert Shelton, which introduced the world to the Shelton characters Wonder Wart-Hog and The Fabulous Furry Freak Brothers. In the spring of 1968, cartoonist Gilbert Shelton, already somewhat known in college humor and underground comix circles for his Superman parody Wonder Wart-Hog, self-published a 28-page one-shot, Feds 'N' Heads Comics, much of the material of which had previously appeared in the Austin, Texas, underground paper The Rag. Feds 'N' Heads was later reprinted an additional 13 times by the Bay Area underground publisher the Print Mint, selling over 200,000 total copies by 1980.

== Contents ==
The Wonder Wart-Hog lead story (co-written by Lieuen Adkins) featured the Hog of Steel's alter-ego, Philbert Desanex, going assignment to San Francisco to cover the Human Be-In (where he encounters Janis Joplin), only to face the diabolical supervillain the Chameleon. Feds 'N' Heads also featured a variety of whimsical strips about hippies, freaks, and above all recreational drugs—and introduced the trio that would become Shelton's most famous creation: The Fabulous Furry Freak Brothers. Other stories in the issue included a couple of psychedelic interpretations of folk and Blues songs and a parody of the novelty ads frequently found in mainstream comic books of that era.

== Publication history ==
Feds 'N' Heads had an initial print run of 5,000 copies, and were hand collated, folded, and stapled by Gilbert Shelton in his Austin garage. Including subsequent printings by Print Mint, the comic had sold over 200,000 copies by 1980.

Details on the different printings:

- Feds 'N' Heads (Gilbert Shelton, Spring 1968): 1st printing, 5,000 copies, yellow road with white buildings and white sidewalk, solid-filled background bands, b&w, 24 pages. Cover price $0.35.
- Feds 'N' Heads (Print Mint, 1968): 2nd printing, 5,000 copies & 3rd printing 9,500 copies (believed to be indistinguishable from one another), golden-brown road and buildings with purple sidewalk, stipple-filled (dotted) background bands. Gilbert Shelton story, cover and art, b&w, 28 pages. Cover price $0.35.
- Feds 'N' Heads (Print Mint, 1970) printings 4-11, 10,000 – 30,000 copies each, b&w, 28 pages. Cover price $0.50–$0.70.

Feds 'N' Heads was also released as an identically-titled board game that was based on the comic book, published as a free pull-out game in the September 1971 issue of Playboy magazine.
