= Matt Howarth =

American cartoonist (1953/1954–2026)

- Born: 1954
- Died: October 5, 2026 (aged 72)
- Areas: Cartoonist, Writer, Artist
- Notable works: Those Annoying Post Bros; Savage Henry; Star Crossed; Bugtown

Matt Howarth (1954 – October 5, 2026) was an American comic book writer and artist known for such series as Those Annoying Post Bros, Savage Henry, Star Crossed, and Bugtown.

== Background ==
Howarth's influences included writers Philip K. Dick and H. P. Lovecraft, comics artists Steve Ditko, Bernie Wrightson, Moebius, and Philippe Druillet, and progressive music. He was active in the field of fanzines from 1969, when he also co-founded Howski Studios.

== Career ==
Howarth, via Howski Studios, published a number of graphic novels and comics in the years 1976–1985.

Howarth's first ongoing series was Those Annoying Post Bros., about two fun-loving bad boys from the fictional Bugtown. In the early 1980s Heavy Metal introduced Post Bros as a continuing story, but they did not have their own comic book until Vortex Comics began publishing Those Annoying Post Bros. in 1985. It ran for 18 issues until 1990. In 1991, the title was taken over by Rip Off Press, which published an additional 20 issues until 1994. MU Press picked up the title from 1994–1998, publishing 25 more issues, for a total of 63 issues.

While continuing to produce Those Annoying Post Bros. Howarth wrote and drew the six-issue limited series Particle Dreams for Fantagraphics in 1986–1987. In 1988, Fantagraphics also published Howarth's six-issue series Keif Llama: Xeno-Tech.

From 1987 to 1994, Howarth did the comic book series Savage Henry for Rip Off Press, about the adventures of a guitarist from an alternate reality. He is the lead guitarist for a fictional insect band called The Bulldaggers. Most issues of this series featured authorized guest appearances by real musicians, including The Residents, Hawkwind, Moby, Ash Ra Tempel, Klaus Schulze, Nash the Slash, Foetus, Yello, Wire, Steve Roach, Richard Pinhas, Ron Geesin, and David Borden. Conrad Schnitzler (an original member of Tangerine Dream and Kluster) was a regular guest in this series and several graphic novels. Howarth created album cover artwork for several releases on the Birdo'Pray record label. He also provided the illustrations for Dr. Adder by K. W. Jeter.

James Wallis of Hogshead Publishing designed a roleplaying game based on Howarth's Bugtown comics. Wallis brought his Bugtown game to Phage Press in 1992 to be produced, but Erick Wujcik had creative differences with Wallis so he pulled the deal from Phage in 1994. Wallis brought his Bugtown game to Wizards of the Coast, but was not successful there either, as Howarth was unable to come to an agreement with Wizards on royalties. In 1996, Wujcik was able to talk Howarth into licensing the Bugtown rights to him again, although Wujcik never actually published a game based on the comic. Howarth did write and draw a crossover between Bugtown and Amber titled "Amber Raves of Pain" which was published in Amberzine from issue #6 (February 1994) through #9 (January 1997).

In 1994–1995, Antarctic Press published Howarth's four-issue series Konny and Czu. The MU Press imprint Aeon Press published Howarth's six-issue limited series Comix of Two Cities in 1996. The DC Comics imprint Helix released Howarth's three-issue limited series Star Crossed in 1997.

In the 2000s, Howarth published the six-issue series Bugtown and the second-volume of Keif Llama: Xeno-Tech (also six issues), both with MU Press.

Beginning in 2008 Howarth published a number of prose novels and short story collections through a print on demand service.

In 2012, Sonoluxe Records released Howarth's 110-page graphic novel The Last of the Neon Cynics as a PDF File on an Enhanced CD also featuring nine pieces composed by musician Bill Nelson as a soundtrack. Set in the 23rd century, the Science-Fiction Western features an intergalactic cowboy called Cassidy. The same year, Howarth contributed a comic to accompany Arthur Brown's CD The Magic Hat.

== Death ==
Howarth died from complications following triple bypass surgery on October 5, 2026, at the age of 72.

== Bibliography ==
- Afternoon in the Sun (Howski Studios, 1976)
- Sand Scripts (Howski Studios, 1977)
- Rock Horror, 3 regular issues (Howski Studios, 1979) — co-starring Savage Henry
- The Hoobi Yaps Artifact (Howski Studios, 1983)
- The League of Mikes (Howski Studios, 1983)
- "Fire Shrine Trilogy" (1983–1987):
  - Temple Snare (Howski Studios, 1983) — reprinted by MU Press in 1990
  - (with W. E. Rittenhouse) The Anti-Chair! (Rhesus Records, 1983) — reprinted as This Is Heat (MU Press, 1993)
  - (with W. E. Rittenhouse) Faith of the Foe (Fandom House, 1987)
- Mailing Mike (Howski Studios, 1984)
- The Dune Encyclopedia (Berkley 1984)
- The Mighty Virus (Howski Studios, 1985)
- WRAB: Pirate Television (Howski Studios, 1985) — spy thriller co-starring the Post Bros and M. Boche
- Those Annoying Post Bros, 63 regular issues plus 3 annuals (Vortex Comics, 1985–1990; Rip Off Press, 1991–1994; MU Press, 1994–1998)
- Particle Dreams, 6 regular issues (Fantagraphics, 1986–1987)
- Savage Henry, 33 regular issues (Vortex Comics, 1987–1990; Rip Off Press, 1990–1993; Caliber Press, 1994; MU Press, 2004)
- The Savage Sword of Mike (Fandom House, 1988) — guest-stars Ron Post., 36 pp.
- Keif Llama: Xeno-Tech vol. 1, 6 regular issues (Fantagraphics, 1988–1989)
- Vigilante Rocker (Reflex magazine, early 1990s) — collected by Howarth with new material; stars Ron Post; 31 pp.
- The Contaminated Zone (3 issues, Brave New Words, 1991) — guest stars include Hiroshima, Savage Henry, Nash the Slash, and The Residents
- Teenage Mutant Ninja Turtles, 2 issues (Mirage Studios, 1991–1992)
- Savage Henry: Headstrong (3 issues, Caliber, 1994)
- Konny and Czu, 4 regular issues (Antarctic Press, 1994–1995)
- (with Lou Stathis) Those Annoying Post Bros.: Stalking Ralph (Aeon Press, 1995) ISBN 978-1883847265 — the Post Bros. are hired to kill The Residents
- Con and C'Thulu: The Cardboard Condo Concert (Aeon, 1996) — starring Conrad Schnitzler
- Con and C'Thulu: Uberdub (3 issues, MU Press, 1996)
- Comix of Two Cities, 6 regular issues (Aeon Press, 1996)
- Star Crossed, 3 issues (DC/Helix, 1997)
- Caroline: Circles vs. Squares (Aeon Press, 1998) ISBN 978-1883847326 — co-stars Savage Henry; 80 pp.
- Savage Henry: Powerchords (3 issues, MU Press, 2004)
- Savage Henry: Puppet Trap (MU Press, 2004)
- Bugtown, 6 regular issues (MU Press, 2004–2005)
- Anubis Horn (MU Press, 2005) ISBN 9781883847425; 128 pp.
- Keif Llama: Xeno-Tech vol. 2, 6 regular issues (MU Press, 2005–2006)
- Con & C'Thulu: Music for Swimming (self-published); 30 pp.
- Bugtown novels:
  - Secondhead Godhead (2008) — featuring Caroline, the Post Bros and Savage Henry; 202 pp.
  - Induced Labor (c. 2009) — the Post Bros kidnap a baby deity; 184 pp.
  - Poisonous Circles (c. 2010) — 2 short stories and a novella; featuring the Post Bros and Savage Henry; 165 pp.
  - Sneakernet (c. 2011) — featuring the Post Bros and Savage Henry; 182 pp.
- The Last of the Neon Cynics, 110-page graphic novel released as PDF File on limited edition (500 copies) Enhanced CD with accompanying soundtrack by Bill Nelson (Sonoluxe, 2012)
- The Magic Hat, comic to accompany The Magic Hat CD by Arthur Brown with Rick Patten (2012)
