= Dean Motter =

Canadian illustrator and designer

- Motter in 2008
- Areas: Writer, Penciller, Inker, Editor, Letterer, Colorist
- Notable works: Mister X, Terminal City, The Prisoner: Shattered Visage
- Awards: 1983 Juno Award / Album Graphics: Anvil: Metal on Metal 1984 Juno Award / Album Graphics: The Nylons: Seamless 1985 Casby Award / Album Cover: Jane Siberry: No Borders Here 1985 Toronto Art Directors Club, Best of the 80's / Album Cover: Honeymoon Suite

Dean Motter is an illustrator, designer and writer who has worked for many years in Canada (Toronto) and the United States (New York City and Atlanta). He is best known for his album cover designs, two of which won Juno Awards. He is also the creator and designer of Mister X, one of the most influential "new-wave" comics of the 1980s.

== Early career ==
Dean Motter showed interest in drawing from an early age, and his parents, both artists themselves, encouraged his endeavors. He initially attended college for fine arts, but lost interest and segued into music. In the late 1970s, Motter edited and art directed Andromeda, a Canadian comic book series which adapted the works of major science–fiction authors such as Arthur C. Clarke and A. E. van Vogt. During that time Motter and collaborator Ken Steacy created The Sacred & The Profane (published in Star Reach), which Archie Goodwin referred to as "the first true graphic novel" in the contemporary comics medium. He also collaborated on the design for Marshall McLuhan's posthumous book Laws of Media and illustrated several educational children's books.

Motter achieved recognition for his album cover design during his tenure as art director for CBS Records Canada, and later with his own studios, Diagram Studios and (following the closure of Diagram) Modern Imageworks. His record jackets and promotional graphics (for acts such as The Nylons, Triumph, Loverboy, Honeymoon Suite, The Diodes, Liona Boyd, The Irish Rovers and Jane Siberry) have won several awards. Motter has been nominated for a Juno Award six times, and won twice. He won a Juno Award in 1983 for "Best Album Graphics" for his work on the Anvil album Metal on Metal. The following year, he again won the "Best Album Graphics" award for his work on the Seamless album by The Nylons, along with Jeff Jackson and Deborah Samuel.

In 1988, he co-wrote and illustrated Shattered Visage for DC Comics based on Patrick McGoohan's 1960s British television series The Prisoner. The following year he created the logo and basic cover design for DC's Piranha Press imprint.

== Later years ==
Menlo Park & Anesta Robbins from Electropolis

Dean relocated in New York City in 1990 where he served as art director and senior designer for Byron Preiss Visual Publications (for whom he also edited a line of Philip Marlowe graphic novels.) In 1993, he joined the staff at DC Comics where he oversaw the corporate and licensing designs for many of their characters. He returned to the freelance community in 1997, retaining his previous employers among his most active clients.

Motter's acclaimed Vertigo mini-series Terminal City and its sequel Terminal City: Aerial Graffiti (both illustrated by Michael Lark) were nominated for a number of Eisner and Harvey Awards during their 1996–1998 run.

His artwork has been featured in many comic book publications, notably the Classics Illustrated adaptation of The Rime of the Ancient Mariner, Batman: Black & White, Grendel: Red, White and Black, John Constantine: Hellblazer and 9-11: Artists Respond as well as the Superman's First Flight children's book for Scholastic. He has written stories for Superman Adventures, Star Wars Tales, Will Eisner's The Spirit, and Wolverine.

In 2001 Dean re-united with Michael Lark to create the award-winning Batman: Nine Lives graphic novel for DC Comics. During that time he also wrote and illustrated Electropolis for Image Comics.

Motter has compiled and designed the retrospectives, Echoes: The Drawings of Michael Wm. Kaluta and The Thrilling Comic Book Cover Art of Alex Schomberg for Vanguard Productions, as well as Mister X: The Archives (including Motter's reminiscences and newly illustrated finale) and Mister X: The Modern Age (collecting Motter's post-millennial Radiant City stories) for Dark Horse Books. He continues to write and illustrate Mister X comics for Dark Horse Comics as well as documentary comic book works for the Los Angeles Museum of the Holocaust, the David S. Wyman Institute for Holocaust Studies, the Karski Institute for Holocaust Education and the Spyscape museum in NYC.

== Personal life ==
Born in the suburbs of Cleveland, Ohio, Dean Motter was raised in a family of devout Protestants. Though an agnostic himself, he regards religion as a positive institution, commenting that "it has value and it has enriched people's lives." He studied under Tom Lodge, Eric McLuhan and artist Michael Hayden in his college years. He has been married three times, including to author Judith Dupré and the late Heather Brown. Having lived in Toronto and Manhattan, he currently makes his home outside of Atlanta, Georgia.
