= The Desert Peach =

American comic book by Donna Barr

The Desert Peach is a comic book created by Donna Barr, chronicling the adventures of the eponymous protagonist, Erwin "The Desert Fox" Rommel's fictitious homosexual younger brother, Oberst Manfred Pfirsich Marie Rommel (1900–1990), nicknamed the "Desert Peach". Early issues of the comic focused on the Peach's command of a misfit unit of the Afrika Korps from 1940 to 1943; subsequent issues have explored the pre- and post-war lives of Pfirsich (German for "Peach") and his supporting cast.

== Publication history ==
The Desert Peach was first published in 1988, by Thoughts and Images, later by MU Press/AEON, and still later by A Fine Line. 32 issues were released throughout the 1990s and early 2000s, and subsequently re-released in eight collected volumes; as well, a Desert Peach musical was produced in 1992, and Bread and Swans, a Desert Peach novel, was released in 2005. With the exception of the musical, all Desert Peach material has been created entirely by Barr.

Barr took Peach to the Modern Tales webcomics collective, where she explored Pfirsich's afterlife: wracked with guilt for having failed to save enough people from the Holocaust, he sentenced himself to Hell. The website ceased operations in 2012 and the comics were removed.

== Inspiration ==
Barr has said that she was inspired to create the character while working in the file office of the University of Washington, which was being painted a "horrible half-pink, half-tan color." Searching for a color name, she stumbled upon "desert peach", and was immediately inspired by the pun upon "The Desert Fox," the name given to Field Marshal Erwin Rommel during World War II . According to his biographers, Rommel had a youngest brother, named Manfred, who died in infancy—Barr said she only developed a personality who the universe had prematurely discarded.

== Supporting cast ==
The Desert Peach commanded the 469th Halftrack, Gravedigging and Support Unit of the Afrika Korps: a catch-all for misfits, mavericks, and otherwise peculiar soldiers who, for whatever reason, were not suitable for service in the German Army but nonetheless were enlisted. In the words of their medical officer (a psychiatrist assigned to the 469th because his specialty was considered a "Jewish science"), it was a unit composed "entirely of stray puppies".

The 469th was based on an escarpment by the sea. Pfirsich was of the opinion that a commander should not merely lead his troops but protect them, and arranged with local Allied commanders that there would be no fighting in that area (although newcomers did not always accept this modus vivendi).

Throughout the series, Barr focused on many characters; the following list includes some of the most prominent.

- Obergefreiter Udo Schmidt: Pfirsich's orderly and aide-de-camp. Scruffy, dirty, ill-tempered, dark-skinned, secretly Jewish, and with a habit of using pages from Mein Kampf as rolling papers, Schmidt was the 469th's only card-carrying member of the Nazi Party. He claimed that his reason for joining was that he had been very young and a desperate Party recruiter had bought him beer.
- Leutnant Kjars Dagobert Winzig: the 469th's self-appointed political officer. A concert pianist in civilian life, the blond, blue-eyed Winzig was an enthusiastic, armband-wearing supporter of Hitler and Nazism. However, he was not actually a party member, since (as he shamefacedly explained) "party members have to pay dues".
- Oberleutnant Rosen Kavalier: ace Luftwaffe pilot, and the Peach's fiancé. A cheerful adventurer, bold and brash, Rosen (whose real name, thanks to his British father, was Melvin Gonville Ramsbottom) once got Pfirsich drunk enough to have heterosexual sex for the first time, claiming that he should experience it at least once. This encounter led to the birth of Pfirsich's son.
- Obergefreiter Heinrich Dobermann: munitions expert. As the result of a training accident on a minefield, Dobermann was brain-damaged, mildly insane, and addicted to several painkillers and psychotropic medications. As well, he adopted a live Tellermine 42 as a pet, naming it "Fridl".
- Kristof Falbe: the 469's mute radio operator. Never speaks, just taps the radio microphone to communicate. Always seen holding a small stuffed dinosaur.

== Bibliography ==
- Thoughts and Images:
  - The Desert Peach #1: Who is This Man?
  - The Desert Peach #2: The Bar Fight
  - The Desert Peach #3: A Day At The Beach
  - The Desert Peach #4: Is There A Nazi In The House?
  - The Desert Peach #5: Flight Of Fancy
  - The Desert Peach #6: A Day Like Any Other
  - The Desert Peach #7: Spoiled Fruit
  - The Desert Peach #8: Dressing Down
  - The Desert Peach #9: Scourge Of Love
  - The Desert Peach #10: Two-Timers
  - The Desert Peach #11: Straight and Narrow
  - The Desert Peach #12: Child Of The World
  - The Desert Peach #13: Nobody
  - The Desert Peach #14: Surprise, Surprise
  - The Desert Peach #15: The Triangle Trade
  - The Desert Peach #16: Plight Of The Phoenix
  - The Desert Peach #17: Culture Shock
  - The Desert Peach #18: Musical Program
  - The Desert Peach #19: Self-Propelled Target
  - The Desert Peach #20: Fever Dreams
  - The Desert Peach #21: The Good Uncle
  - The Desert Peach #22: Lady Luck
  - The Desert Peach #23: Visions
  - The Desert Peach #24: Ups And Downs
  - The Desert Peach #25: Beautiful
  - The Desert Peach Collection: Beginnings (issues 1 - 3)
  - The Desert Peach Collection: Politics, Pilots and Puppies (issues 4 - 6)
  - The Desert Peach Collection: Foreign Relations (issues 7 - 9)
  - The Desert Peach Collection: Baby Games (issues 10 - 12)
  - The Desert Peach Collection: Belief Systems (issues 13 - 15)
  - The Desert Peach Collection: Marriage and Mayhem (issues 16, 17, 19)
  - Ersatz Peach
  - Peach Slices (first edition - sold out)
- A Fine Line Press (available at mupress till #30)
  - The Desert Peach #26: Miki
  - The Desert Peach #27: New And Different
  - The Desert Peach #28: Tongue
  - The Desert Peach #29: Out Of The East
  - The Desert Peach #30: Headaches
  - The Desert Peach #31: Pithed
  - The Desert Peach #32: Keeper
  - Peach Slices (second edition, with additional artwork and Desert Peach #25)
- Seven Peaches contains the first seven Desert Peach issues
- Bread and Swans, the Desert Peach Novel
- Robot Comics has announced that it will re-release Desert Peach titles on the Amazon Kindle.
