= Donna Barr =

American comic book author and cartoonist (born 1952)

- Born: August 13, 1952 (age 74) Everett, Washington
- Areas: Cartoonist, Writer, Penciller, Publisher
- Notable works: The Desert Peach; Stinz

Donna Barr (born August 13, 1952) is an American comic book author and cartoonist. She is best known for The Desert Peach and Stinz.

== Life and education ==
Donna Barr was born in Everett, Washington, and is the second child of six. She had earned a bachelor's degree in German from Ohio State University in 1978. Barr had enlisted in the United States Army and served from 1970 to 1973. She was a school trained teletype operator who was an E5, or Sergeant. Because of this position she was not sent into war. Donna Barr had met her husband Dan during her time in the army. She now lives in Clallam Bay, Washington with her husband.

== Works ==
Barr works in pencil, ink, watercolor, and silkscreen.

She is known for her series Stinz and The Desert Peach. Stinz, originally published in 1986 as a short story in a hand-bound book, tells the story of a society of centaur-like people in a setting reminiscent of pre-industrial Germany.

Barr's other long-running series, The Desert Peach, is about Pfirsich Rommel, the fictional homosexual younger brother of Erwin "The Desert Fox" Rommel. Started in 1987, it is set in North Africa during World War 2. The comic has been describes as a fantasy war comic that was set within the German regime. Pfirsch ("Peach") Rommel is a colonel in the German Afrika Korps. The rest of this unit of misfits include a mute radio officer, a shell-shocked mental case with a pet landmine, a French-speaking black Moroccan, an American prisoner of war, and a Cossack mercenary. In this context, a gay colonel engaged to marry a hotshot Luftwaffe ace does not seem out of place. It comes to fruition with the fact that the story is actually a long running flashback. According to Barr, some of the themes within The Desert Peach are "Love, Honor, Death and Tea, Surfing, fascism, obnoxious pilots and boyfriends, birth, love, hate, revenge, rape, child-murder, slavery, tribal customs, insanity, drug-use, prejudice, racism, death-camps, warfare, love-at-first-sight, homophobia, bad relationships, feminism, horse-training, camel-theft, fashion, marriage, euthanasia, grandchildren—etc., etc., etc." Donna Barr explains her process of creating The Desert Peach as, "I usually do a rough on scrap paper (junk mail has lots of blank backs!), happily cutting and pasting, then I copy the whole thing (so the back is clear), rearrange the copy backwards on the back of the final paper, slap in some lettering guides, flip it over on a light table, and use it as a rough guide while I ink. No penciling, and no erasing".

Both Stinz and The Desert Peach are now largely serialized online and her novels are self-published. Other works include Hader and the Colonel (1987), The Barr Girls (1990), and Bosom Enemies (1987). Barr has also published a number of novels, including Permanent Party, An Insupportable Light, Ringcat, and Bread and Swans. Her latest series, Afterdead, is a crossover of all of her characters. It is said to be politically charged and wild.

Her work has been translated into German, Japanese, Italian, and Croatian. Barr has created a series of handmade ornate, stitchery-covered bound sketchbooks, called the Black Manuscripts.

== Awards and accomplishments ==
Barr and her work have been recognized with numerous awards and honors. These include The Xeric Grant in 2000, The Bruce Brown Foundation Grant in 2004, San Diego Comic-Con's Inkpot Award in 1996, Seattle's Cartoonists Northwest's Toonies in 1998, London Comics Creators Guild's Best Ongoing Humor Series in 1992, and the Washington Press Association's Communicator of Excellence for Fiction in 1997 and 1998. Barr appeared at the Cartoonists Northwest Association 2016 event and received a Golden Toonie Award.

== Involvement ==
Donna Barr has been involved in the Northwestern US community as a member of the Graphic Artists Guild, the National Writers Union, UAW/AFL-CIO, and has acted as a consultant for the Media curriculum in the Arts Department at Olympic College in Bremerton, Washington. She lectures on her work at conventions and symposiums all over the United States, Canada, and Europe. She attended Opttaconn in 2019.
