= Opening and closing sequences of The Prisoner =

Television sequences

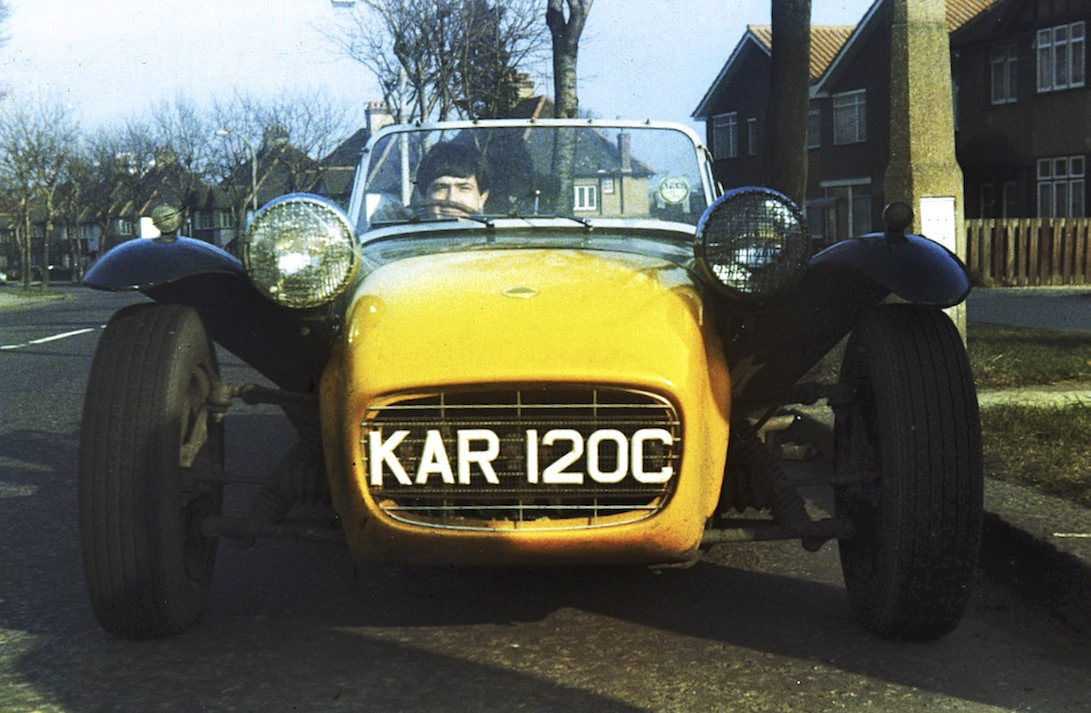
The Lotus Seven car used in the opening sequences

The opening and closing sequences of the TV series The Prisoner are considered iconic. The music over the opening and closing credits, as broadcast, was composed by Ron Grainer, a composer whose other credits include the theme music for Doctor Who.

== The music ==
Ron Grainer's theme was chosen after two other composers, Robert Farnon and Wilfred Josephs, created themes that were rejected by series executive producer Patrick McGoohan. Farnon's theme was rejected for being a virtual copy from the film The Big Country (1958). Josephs' discordant theme got as far as being applied to early edits of "Arrival" and "The Chimes of Big Ben", and can be heard on the recovered early edits of these two episodes that have subsequently been released to DVD. (Prior to this, Josephs' melody was used as incidental music on the broadcast versions of "Arrival".) Farnon's theme remained unheard until it was unearthed for Don't Knock Yourself Out, a DVD featurette created for the 2007 DVD reissue of The Prisoner in the UK; the featurette was also included in the 2009 A&E Home Video DVD and Blu-ray release in North America. Before he would finally use Grainer's theme, McGoohan required Grainer to rescore it in a faster tempo and emphasise the timpani.

== Opening sequence ==
The title sequence (seen in all but two episodes) begins with a clouded sky and the sound of thunder, the latter becoming that of a jet engine. As the theme music begins a runway (believed to be Santa Pod Raceway in Podington in real life) appears and a Lotus Super Seven drives under the camera (driven by stuntman Jack Cooper). The view dissolves to reveal a stern-faced man, the future Number Six (Patrick McGoohan), driving past the Houses of Parliament in London and into the underground car park opposite parliament in Great College Street, underneath Abingdon Street Gardens (also known as College Green). Much of this footage was shot on 28 August 1966.

Entering the building through a set of double doors labelled "Way Out", he then strides down a long, narrow corridor leading to another set of double doors; he pulls these open with great ferocity. The man mounts a fierce (but inaudible) argument before a man (played by series co-creator George Markstein) at a desk, delivers an envelope marked "Private—Personal—By Hand" (presumably his letter of resignation) to the other man, and slams his fist onto the desk, smashing the saucer of a cup of tea. Throughout all of this, the man behind the desk is not seen to speak and appears to be fiddling with a pen, so it never becomes clear whether he is even listening to what is being said. The angry man leaves and drives home (to 1 Buckingham Place, London SW1 6HR), past Buckingham Palace. He does not realise that he is being followed by a hearse, identified by the number plate "TLH 858".

Meanwhile, in an unknown location full of filing cabinets, an automated system types a series of large Xs across the man's photograph and drops it into a drawer marked "RESIGNED".

At the man's flat, he quickly packs a suitcase, including several travel-destination brochures. The hearse pulls up and a man dressed like an undertaker approaches the front door. A white vapour floods the room through the keyhole, rendering the man immobile as he gazes at the large apartment buildings outside his window, and then collapses, unconscious. This is followed by a momentary blackout (in some showings, a commercial break occurs here). He awakens seemingly in the same place, rises, walks to a window, looks out and this time, instead of the apartment buildings, sees the Village. This is shown in a shot from his point of view, through the window, over which the episode's title is superimposed. In all but four episodes this is followed by a montage of the man running around the Village, over which the following dialogue is heard:

Number Six: Where am I?
Number Two (not identified as yet): In the village.
Six: What do you want?
Two: Information.
Six: Whose side are you on?
Two: That would be telling. We want information...information... information!!!
Six: You won't get it!
Two: By hook or by crook, we will.
Six: Who are you?
Two: The new Number Two.
Six: Who is Number One?
Two: You are Number Six.
Six (running on the Village's beach): I am not a number; I am a free man!!!
Two: [Laughter]

A close-up of the actor playing Number Two in the particular episode is usually inserted once. Credits for guest stars, producer David Tomblin, script editor George Markstein (thirteen episodes only), the writer(s) and director are superimposed over this.

=== Variations ===
This is not invariable across the run. Sometimes Number Two's side of the conversation is provided by Robert Rietti instead of the actual actor; only Leo McKern, Mary Morris, Colin Gordon and Peter Wyngarde provided dialogue for the conversation. For the remaining episodes (where the dialogue was used) Rietti's voiceover was heard, although a shot of the actor playing Number Two would still be inserted following the line "By hook or by crook, we will." (The exceptions are "Many Happy Returns" and "The Girl Who Was Death", where an extra shot of Rover was inserted instead, because revealing Number Two's identity at that stage would have spoiled the plot.) In the cases of "Many Happy Returns" and "Free for All", Rietti's voiceover is used despite one of the characters ultimately revealed as Number Two in those episodes being female.

In "Arrival", the first episode of the series, the opening sequence is slightly longer and contains additional footage. When the hero pulls into the underground car park, he takes a ticket from an automatic machine and then parks next to a kerb. He gets out of the car and pushes through a set of double doors, which bear the words "Way" and "Out". As he leaves, what appears to be the hearse is waiting for the Prisoner to pull out onto the street; shortly after this, the Lotus passes it. None of this is shown in any other episode. The dialogue sequence does not follow the awakening here, because it is essentially a compressed presentation of the Prisoner's learning about his new surroundings as depicted in detail over the course of this episode. In the original broadcast order of the series (which did not reflect production order), the dialogue between Number Six and Number Two is first heard in "The Chimes of Big Ben".

In "A. B. and C.", instead of "The new Number Two", the line is read as "I am Number Two". Here the role is played by Colin Gordon, who would also have the part in "The General". As noted above, the episodes were not broadcast in production sequence; Gordon filmed his appearance as Number Two in "The General" first.

"Do Not Forsake Me Oh My Darling" precedes the resignation sequence with a scene featuring two men sitting in an office and discussing a series of projected slides, that one of the men is certain conceals a message. Furthermore, this episode eschews the dialogue between Number Six and Number Two and superimposes the opening credits over footage of a helicopter arriving in the Village.

"Living in Harmony" features none of the typical title sequence at all, instead opening with a Western-style version. McGoohan appears as a sheriff turning in his badge, and soon thereafter getting ambushed and beaten into unconsciousness by several men, at which point the episode title is displayed. (In this episode, the series title is not displayed on screen until the closing credits.) He subsequently wakes in a town called Harmony, run by a very Number Two-like Judge.

"Fall Out" also does away with the standard sequences; instead, it opens with a recap of the previous episode, "Once Upon a Time", followed by a series of aerial shots of the Village over which the typical credits are superimposed. (Also, there is an additional screen at the beginning revealing the location of the Village as Portmeirion.) Although Patrick McGoohan is credited as the episode's writer and director, at no point in the opening or closing credits is he credited as playing Number Six in this finale episode.

=== Number One ===
The high production values involved have led the opening sequence to be described as more like film than television. Like the series as a whole, the opening sequence can be seen as a prefiguration of postmodernism; it establishes an Orwellian dramatic premise that is deconstructed by its own absurdity. In addition, the final episode recontextualises the exchange in the opening sequence for some: the response to "Who is Number One?" is believed to be not "You are Number Six", a deflection, but "You are, Number Six," a truthful answer. Despite this, the scene itself does not contain any comma in these particular lines.

== Tag ==
Just before the closing credits of each episode (except "Fall Out"), the face of The Prisoner rises up from a bird's-eye view of the Village, to be covered by bars clanging shut. This is not seen in "Fall Out" as a tag, but appears in the crystal ball held by the robed Number One in the episode's climax.

== Closing credits ==
The Village's penny-farthing logo

The closing credits appear over a drawing of the penny-farthing bicycle, the logo of the Village, that slowly assembles in stop-frame animation. After the bicycle is fully assembled, the shot changes to one of Rover, the large, white, balloon-like Village guard device, rising up through water and bouncing into the distance. In the transmission prints, there is no consistency as to when the cut to replace these graphics with the clip of Rover occurs. In a couple of episodes, the last piece of the bicycle has yet to appear, and in another, its entire framework has faded away from the wheels.

In the originally planned version of the closing credits, seen in the alternative version of "The Chimes of Big Ben", Rover is not shown. Instead, the image of the bicycle frame fades out to leave only the wheels. The wheels then begin to spin faster and faster transforming into Earth (little wheel) and the Universe (big wheel). The Earth, spinning on its axis, flies toward the camera and explodes into the word "POP". (This is an acronym for "Protect Other People" which is referred to in the episode "Once Upon a Time", and also in the show's occasional use of the song "Pop Goes the Weasel".)

An early edit of "Arrival", released to DVD in 2007, does not include the POP animation. Instead, after the bike completely forms, the background fades to a starfield, with the Earth in the place of the smaller wheel and the universe as the big wheel. The canopy of the bike then appears in the sky above the two "wheels".

The final episode, "Fall Out", presents a further variation; the completed bicycle maintains its visual presence during the closing strains of the theme, instead of being replaced by either the cosmic animation or the live-action footage of Rover.

Regarding actor credits, three variants of note are "Living in Harmony" and "The Girl Who Was Death", which include the "Patrick McGoohan as the Prisoner" credit during the closing credits in place of his executive producership; and "Fall Out" which, though crediting McGoohan for writing and directing the episode early on, omits any other credit for him, while displaying the names of cast members Leo McKern and Alexis Kanner three times each. Angelo Muscat (The Butler) also gets his name on screen an extra time, in the closing minutes of the story where the other two actors' names get their additional displays; for McGoohan's turn here, there is an overhead shot of Number Six's car on London streets, so high that the driver is unidentifiable, and the word "Prisoner" (no "The") is superimposed instead of the actor's name as had just happened with Kanner, McKern and Muscat.
