= In My Mind (film) =

Documentary about Patrick McGoohan

- Blu-ray release cover
- Directed by: Chris Rodley
- Written by: Chris Rodley
- Produced by: Tim Beddows; Joseph D'Morais; Chris Rodley
- Starring: Patrick McGoohan; Catherine McGoohan; Lew Grade; David Tomblin; Jack Shampan; Lewis Greifer
- Narrated by: Chris Rodley
- Cinematography: Ross Tuttle
- Edited by: Chris Noakes; Bradley Richards
- Music by: Tony Burke
- Distributed by: Network
- Release date: October 30, 2017
- Running time: 78 minutes
- Country: United Kingdom
- Language: English

In My Mind is a 2017 British documentary film about Patrick McGoohan and the making of The Prisoner, the late 1960s allegorical science-fiction TV series. The documentary was created and narrated by Chris Rodley for the 50th anniversary of the original airing of the TV series in the UK. The film follows the events surrounding Rodley's visit to interview McGoohan in 1983 for a 1984 documentary about the making of the original series.

It premiered at 'Fall In', a celebration of the Prisoner TV series held at the original outdoor location of Portmeirion in north Wales and was released on Blu-ray Disc on 30 October 2017.

== Summary ==
In 1983, Channel 4, the newly created fourth television channel in the UK, repeated all 17 episodes of the original series of The Prisoner. Following the airing of the final episode "Fall Out" in 1984, the channel had arranged to create a special one-hour programme discussing the making of the series called Six Into One – The Prisoner File.

During the creation of this programme, Chris Rodley flew to California to interview Patrick McGoohan, who was the co-creator and lead actor of the TV series. Since the original UK broadcast of the series during 1967 and early 1968, McGoohan had given very few interviews about what The Prisoner meant.

Rodley had arranged to interview McGoohan in an empty house in Laurel Canyon in Los Angeles. The recording of this interview was not used and McGoohan requested that they reconvene and re-shoot the interview in Santa Monica. Excerpts from this interview were used in the Channel 4 programme.

It was only after McGoohan's death in 2009 that Rodley revisited the original interview and created the In My Mind documentary about the process of interviewing McGoohan. The documentary includes previously unseen interviews, excerpts from the original series, and portions of McGoohan's 1977 interview in Canada with Warner Troyer. Additionally, interviews recorded in 1983 are included with Lew Grade whose company financed the series, David Tomblin who wrote the first script (with George Markstein) and produced the series, writer Lewis Greifer and art director Jack Shampan. McGoohan's daughter, Catherine, is also interviewed and gives insights into her father's time on the series.

McGoohan later saw the cut of the Channel 4 documentary and hated it. He then produced his own interview documentary, known as the L.A. Tape, excerpts of which are shown in the Rodley documentary. The Channel 4 programme Six Into One – The Prisoner File has never been repeated since first broadcast.

== Appearances ==
- Patrick McGoohan - actor, writer, director and producer
- Catherine McGoohan - daughter of Patrick McGoohan
- Lew Grade - ITC media owner
- David Tomblin - producer, writer
- Jack Shampan - art director
- Lewis Greifer - writer

== Release ==
The documentary was premiered at the 50th anniversary gathering at Portmeirion, the village in mid-Wales that was used to portray The Village (the prison 'resort' where McGoohan's character Number Six was incarcerated). It was subsequently released by the Network imprint.
