= Arrival (The Prisoner) =

First episode of the first series of The Prisoner

- The Prisoner episode
- Episode no.: Series 1 Episode 1
- Directed by: Don Chaffey
- Written by: George Markstein; David Tomblin
- Production code: 1
- Original air date: 29 September 1967

Guest appearances
- Guy Doleman; George Baker; Virginia Maskell; Paul Eddington

Episode chronology
← Previous —	Next → "The Chimes of Big Ben"

"Arrival" is the first episode of the allegorical British science fiction TV series The Prisoner. It was written by George Markstein and David Tomblin, and directed by Don Chaffey. It was first broadcast in the UK on ITV (ATV Midlands and Grampian) on Friday 29 September 1967, and first aired in the United States on CBS on Saturday 1 June 1968.

The episode introduced the character of Number Six, portrayed by co-creator Patrick McGoohan, and introduced Guy Doleman and George Baker in the role of Number Two, the regularly changing administrator of The Village in which Number Six was incarcerated.

The episode introduced most of the concepts of the series present throughout its run, as Number Two used various means to find out why Number Six had abruptly resigned from his intelligence job.

== Plot summary ==
An unidentified British intelligence agent storms into his employer's London office to hand in his resignation. He returns home in his Lotus Seven and hastily packs a bag to go travelling, unaware that a hearse has followed him home. The hearse driver releases knockout gas into the man's home via the keyhole. The man collapses in his study. Later, the man wakes up in what appears to be his study, but finds it is a mockup located in "The Village". He asks the colourfully clad residents of the Village what country he is in, but they cannot provide a satisfactory answer. He discovers the Village is surrounded by mountains save for its beachline, which opens onto the ocean with no sign of land nearby. Frustrated, he returns to the mockup study and finds it is attached to a modern flat. There, he receives a phone call and is told that Number Two wants to meet him at the Green Dome.

A lot of people are curious about what lies behind your resignation. You've had a brilliant career. They want to know why you suddenly left.

— Number Two to Number Six

At the Green Dome, where several technicians monitor all aspects of the Village, Number Two tells the man they only wish to know why he resigned and to whom he is loyal, as the intelligence he has gathered over his career is too valuable to simply let him "walk away". Number Two suggests they would rather have his cooperation, but are prepared to use other means as needed. Number Two takes the man on a tour of the Village to show him the security systems they have in place to keep the inhabitants in line, including Rover, a mysterious floating balloon guardian that attacks those who flee. Later that night, the man attempts escape by sea but Rover catches him and renders him unconscious.

I will not make any deals with you. I've resigned. I will not be pushed, filed, stamped, indexed, briefed, debriefed, or numbered! My life is my own!

— Number Six to Number Two

The man wakes in the Village's hospital, and finds a former colleague, Cobb, in the next bed. The man learns Cobb is also incarcerated in the Village, but before he can learn more, the hospital staff take him away for examination. On his return, he is told Cobb committed suicide by jumping out of the window. The man is released, and goes to accost Number Two, but finds that a different man is in the Green Dome. The new Number Two explains they may change that position from time to time for unexplained reasons. He then explains that no one in the Village uses his or her name, but is instead assigned a number, and the man is now Number Six. Number Six refuses to use this title as he adjusts to life in the Village.

Number Six attends Cobb's funeral and observes a woman watching from afar, and proceeds to follow her around the Village before he talks to her directly. The woman, Number Nine, claims to have been working with Cobb on an escape plan, and suggests that Number Six can still use the same plan. She gives him an electropass that can keep Rover at bay, giving him time to escape via a helicopter. Number Six has doubts about her motives as he had seen her talking to Number Two, but accepts the pass. That night, Number Six uses the pass and acquires a helicopter, but as he flies off, one of the technicians remotely takes over the helicopter and returns it to the Village. Number Six is escorted back to his home in the Village. Number Two is watching these events with Cobb, who had faked his death to mislead Number Six. With his assignment complete, Cobb prepares to move on to his next duty, but warns Number Two that Number Six will be "a tough nut to crack".

== Cast ==
- Virginia Maskell as The Woman
- Guy Doleman as Number Two
- Paul Eddington as Cobb
- George Baker as The New Number Two
- Angelo Muscat as The Butler
- Barbara Yu Ling as Taxi driver (Number 18)
- Stephanie Randall as Maid (Number 66)
- Jack Allen as Doctor
- Fabia Drake as Welfare worker
- Denis Shaw as Shopkeeper (Number 19)
- Oliver MacGreevy as Gardener/electrician
- Frederick Piper as Ex-Admiral (Number 66)
- Patsy Smart as Waitress (Number 104)
- Christopher Benjamin as Labour Exchange manager (Number 20)
- Peter Swanwick as Supervisor (Number 28)
- David Garfield as Hospital attendant
- Peter Brace as 1st Guardian
- Keith Peacock as 2nd Guardian
- Fenella Fielding as Loudspeaker Announcer & Telephone Operator (voice only)

== Production ==
=== Exterior shots at Portmeirion ===
The first draft script by George Markstein was completed in the spring of 1966. David Tomblin then assisted Markstein and they prepared a script that Patrick McGoohan then further adapted. In late June 1966 a shooting script had been finalised (now called "The Arrival"). Principal location filming began in Portmeirion on 5 September 1966, with Don Chaffey as director.

Further scenes were shot on 6 September, but Guy Doleman (playing Number Two) was suffering from cracked ribs and his presence only lasted two days. The plan was to complete shooting at Portmeirion by 9 September but filming was to overrun by several days. The aerial shots from the helicopter were filmed between 14 and 16 September. A body double was used for the now absent Guy Doleman. Chaffey was still filming exterior shots for the episode on 18 September. On 30 September, the last day of shooting at Portmeirion, McGoohan directed a number of shots including Rover's attack on a Villager in the main piazza.

During the shooting in September it was realised that the initial idea for the guardian 'Rover' was unworkable. Initially the device was intended as a black-and-white domed contraption with a blue light on top. Inside was a go-kart and room enough for a man to steer. It quickly became evident that the contraption was unsteerable on Portmeirion's cobbled streets. A version that would act on water simply sank. Whose idea it was to use weather balloons is contested but it would appear someone saw them being used over the estuary and decided they could be used as 'Rover'.

=== Interior shots at MGM-British, Borehamwood ===
During the first two weeks of October 1966, the interior scenes were shot at the MGM-British Studios. All of guest stars George Baker (new Number Two) and Paul Eddington (Cobb) were shot in this period. A key set was redressed as Number Two's living quarters, the Control Room and the Labour Exchange. Other shots showed the General Store and the interior of Number Six's cottage.

=== Editing ===
Editing of "Arrival" began immediately after the interior shots were completed. Lee Doig had a rough cut of the episode prepared by the end of December 1966. Geoff Foot also finished the opening sequence for the episode – this longer version was only used to introduce this episode. The initial cut was some 90 minutes long and numerous cuts had to be made to bring it down to the required 48 minutes for transmission.

=== Music ===
Robert Farnon composed the first score and cues for the episode on 20 December 1966. His score and theme tune was rejected, and Wilfred Josephs was commissioned to write another in early January 1967.

The first edit of the episode appeared in February 1967, but by March much of Josephs' score had been removed. Ron Grainer was asked to create a theme tune and his was later used on all episodes, a longer version prepared for the extended opening sequence in "Arrival". Additional incidental music cues created by Albert Elms.

== Alternative version ==
During the production of the last four episodes of The Prisoner series (the episode "Living in Harmony" was being made) ITC arranged for a press conference to take place at MGM-British studios in Borehamwood on 20 September 1967 – a week before the scheduled transmission on some British TV channels. At the press coverage Patrick McGoohan (at the start wearing his kosho uniform, a made up martial art used in the series) was interviewed inside the cage shown in the episode "Once Upon a Time". Also present was Angelo Muscat, the mute butler seen in most episodes, and Alexis Kanner. Two episodes – "Arrival" and "The Chimes of Big Ben" – were played to the press. Both episodes had different title sequences at start and finish to that eventually broadcast, as well as with different theme music (by Albert Elms rather than Ron Grainer) and different edits of scenes including different shots and extra dialogue. The alternative version of "Arrival" was released by the Network imprint on DVD in the UK in 2003. A 2007 DVD release included an improved-quality version, digitally remastered from a faded 35mm print, which can also be viewed with a music-only soundtrack.

== Broadcast ==
The broadcast date of the episode varied in different ITV regions of the UK. The episode was first shown at 7:30pm on Friday 29 September 1967 on ATV Midlands and Grampian Television, on Sunday 1 October on ATV London, Southern Television, Westward Television and Tyne-Tees; on Thursday 5 October on Scottish Television, on Friday 6 October on Anglia Television, on Thursday 19 October on Border Television and on Friday 27 October on Granada Television in the North West. The aggregate viewing figures for the ITV regions that debuted the season in 1967 have been estimated at 11.0 million. In Northern Ireland, the episode did not debut until Saturday 6 January 1968, and in Wales, the episode was not broadcast until Wednesday 7 January 1970.

== Rover ==
Rover, the white balloon guardian, made its first appearance in this episode but was not identified by this name on-screen until the later episode "The Schizoid Man".

== Sources ==
- Fairclough, Robert, ed. (2004). The Prisoner: The Original Scripts. Vol. 1. foreword by Lewis Greifer. Reynolds & Hearn. ISBN 978-1-903111-76-5. OCLC 61145235. – script of episode
