= The Village (The Prisoner) =

Fictional setting of the UK series The Prisoner

- The Prisoner location
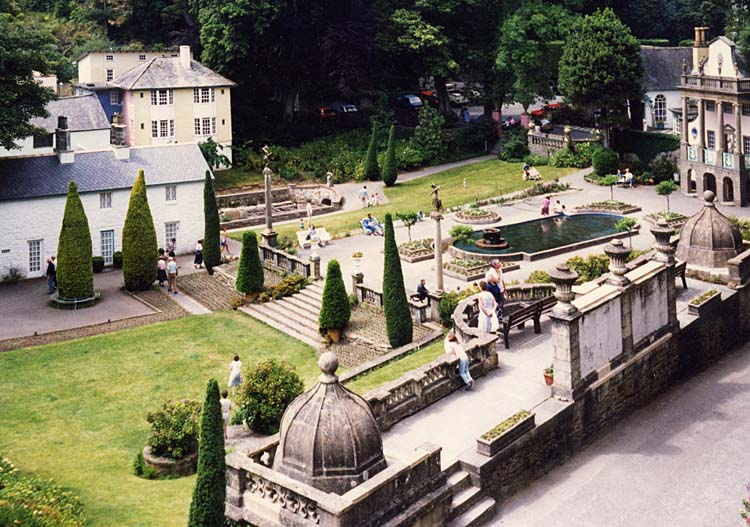
- The piazza in Portmeirion, the real-life filming location for exterior shots of the Village
- First appearance: "Arrival" (1967)
- Last appearance: "Fall Out" (1968)
- Created by: Patrick McGoohan; George Markstein

In-universe information
- Type: Village
- Location: Great Britain
- Character: Number Six

The Village is the fictional setting of the 1960s UK television series The Prisoner where the main character, Number Six, is held with other former spies and operatives from various countries. The theme of the series is his captors' attempts to find out why Number Six resigned from his job and his attempts to escape from the Village and learn the identity of Number One. Ostensibly, those running the Village – thought by many to be countries around the world – believe that once Number Six is coerced into explaining the motive(s) behind his resignation, all the state secrets he knows will come tumbling out. However, the ultimate use of these secrets is only intimated, but not overtly explored. Beyond its explicit physical setting, the Village is also viewed as an allegory for humanity and society during the Cold War era. Patrick McGoohan notes in various post-show interviews that the Village is "within all of us ... we all live in a little Village ... Your village may be different from other people's villages but we are all prisoners."

== Description ==
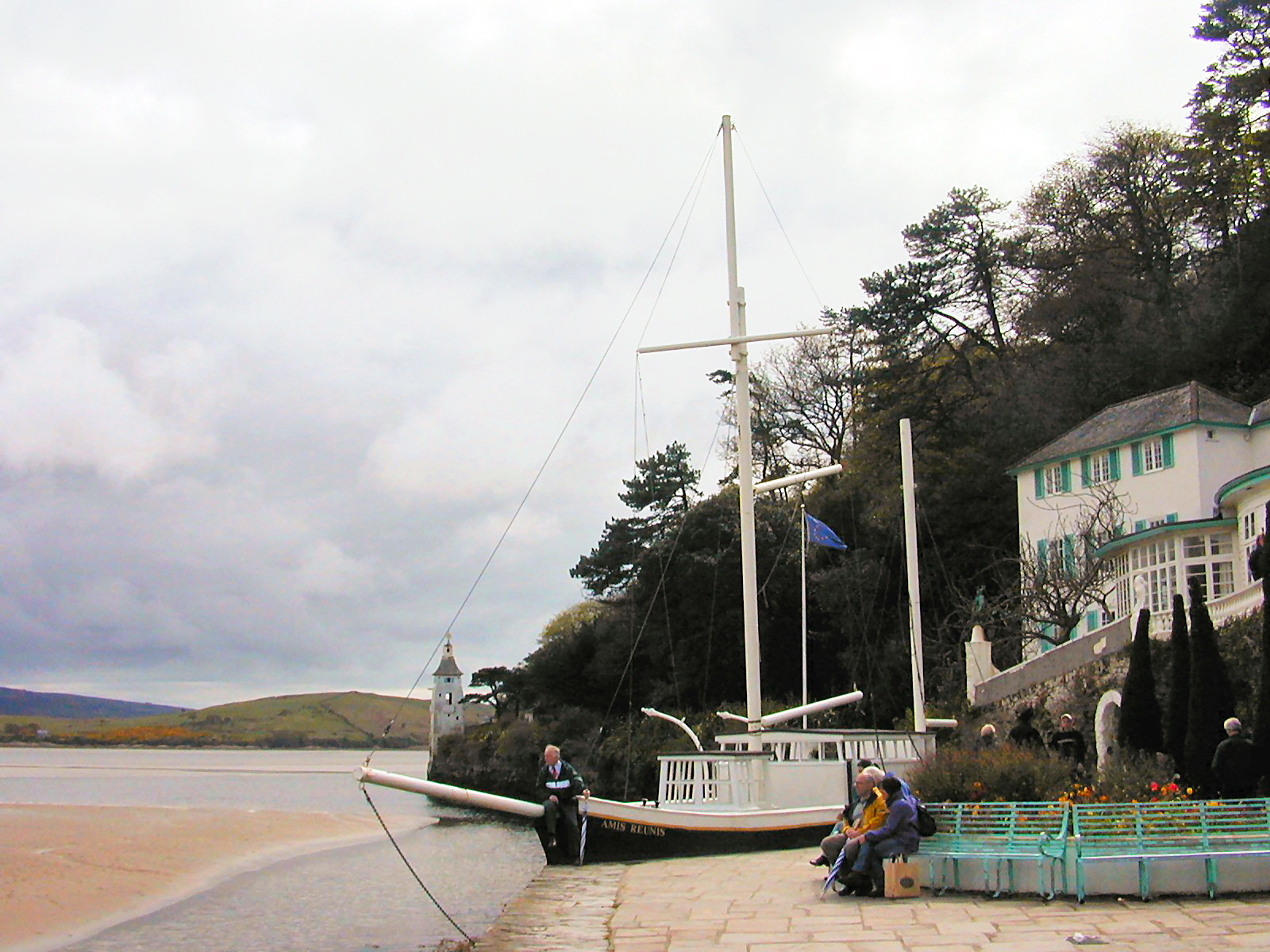
The Stone Boat located in front of the Village's "Old People's Home" (in real life the Hotel Portmeirion)

The location of the Village is unknown until the end of the series; clues to its whereabouts are contradictory until the final episode. In "Many Happy Returns," it is said to be on the coast of Morocco or southern Portugal, possibly an island, and is located by Number Six in this area while making reconnaissance passes in an aircraft. Prior to this, in "The Chimes of Big Ben," it is claimed to be located in the Soviet Union on the Baltic Sea (the episode states "in Lithuania, 30 miles from the Polish border"), though it is later revealed that this was a Village disinformation plot. In the alternative version of the episode "The Chimes of Big Ben," Number Six constructs a device that allows him to work out the Village's location; this scene was cut – presumably to remove the reference to navigation by stars, which would have allowed an estimation at the least of the Village's general position, thereby undermining the story line of the episode (if not a key element in the entire series). The un-cut version of the episode is not considered part of the series' "canon".

The series final episode, "Fall Out," reveals that the Village is actually located in Great Britain, as Number Six and other characters are able to drive from the Village to central London. Although a line of dialogue in "Many Happy Returns" has a character speculating that the Village is on an island, this is never confirmed in the series, and in fact all given locations (save for that in "Fall Out") should be considered unreliable evidence given the fact they are mentioned as part of a deception aimed at getting Number Six to reveal why he resigned from his secret British government job.

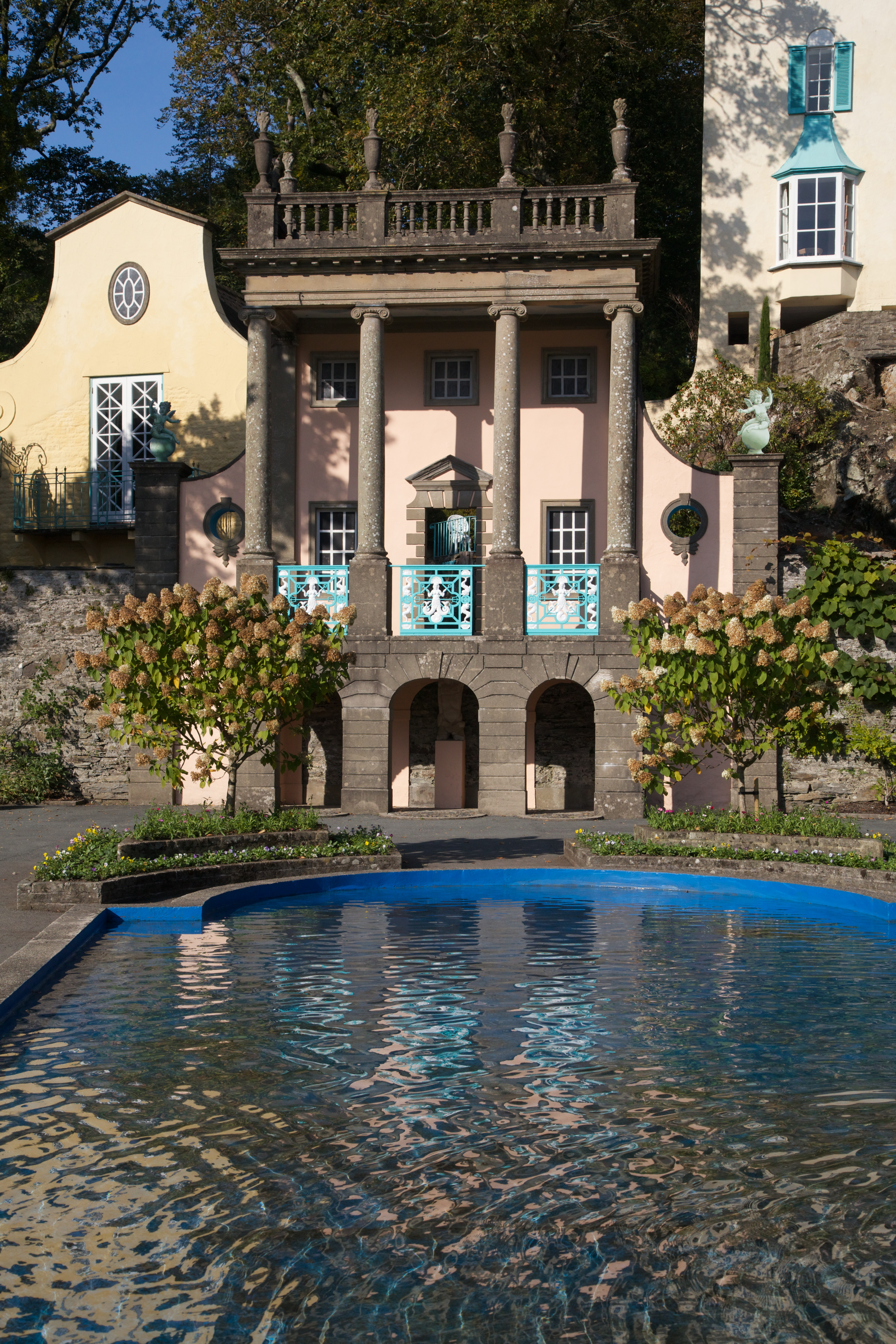
The Gloriette – used extensively in the episode Free for All

The Italianate architecture of the Village is somewhat deceptive as the interiors of the buildings are frequently Georgian, 1960s 'mod', or in a number of instances, an oddly sparse kind of 'ultra modern' design. Throughout the Village, music plays in the background, nearly all of it alternating between rousing marching band music and lullabies, periodically interrupted by public announcements (voiced by Fenella Fielding). The media and signage consistently incorporate sailing and resort themes.

Exactly who operates the Village is unclear. Ostensibly, the Village is run by a democratically elected council, with a popularly elected executive officer known as "Number Two" presiding over it and the Village itself, although internal dialogue indicates that the entire process is rigged. "Work units" or "credits" serve as currency in its shops, and are kept track of with a hole-punched credit card. Although various members of the community in the Village are shown to hold down jobs or even own businesses, most, including Number Six do not seem to work, though they are nevertheless given a comfortable lifestyle.

The exact size of the environs of the Village is never established on screen. Besides the main Village setting, which is known to include a hospital building, there are woods, mountains and coastal areas. The Village is large enough that one episode ("Living in Harmony") established that an entire Old West town and environs was built somewhere in the vicinity. In "Arrival", "Many Happy Returns" and other episodes, Number Six actually views the Village from the air, yet is apparently unable to spot any surrounding towns or cities. In other episodes (depending upon the camera angle), buildings can clearly be seen on the far side of the bay. Nevertheless, all maps of the Village seen in the series display little beyond the central village, indicating that it is surrounded on three sides by mountains (as seen by Number Six in "Many Happy Returns") and sea on the fourth, though the map does show a road leading off the map which may connect to the other areas, such as the Village hospital which is depicted as being in a field-like area away from the core Village (at least in some episodes like "Arrival;" in others, such as "Chimes of Big Ben," it is shown to be overlooking the central plaza of the Village).

== Identification badges ==
For official identification purposes, all residents and staff of the Village are assigned numbers in lieu of names, and with very few exceptions the use of proper names is discouraged, if not outright forbidden. A few characters are referred to by their former military rank such as general or admiral. Numbers are reused and reassigned, presumably as and when the current holder leaves the Village. (However, in "Arrival", two separate characters both wear identification badges identifying them as Number 66; this is neither commented upon nor any sort of plot device, and is almost certainly simply a continuity error.) The actual population of the Village is unknown – other than that there are some residents whose numbers are in the low triple digits (in "The Schizoid Man" a private residence is briefly seen with the number 241; the highest number clearly seen is Number 255, on the badge of the waitress in "Free For All". Careful frame-by-frame analysis of the Blu-Ray version of "Arrival" shows that Rover's first on-screen victim wears badge number 260, but this would not have been evident to TV viewers in 1967.) Save for Number Two, the numbering appears to have no bearing on one's authority or rank within the Village. Most identification badges are white, but occasionally black. The only character never seen wearing a number badge (other than Number Six, who refuses and is only seen wearing a badge on a couple of occasions) is the unnamed butler who serves Number Two; his number (if he has one) is never revealed.

There are a very small number of Villagers consistently identified by a proper name, and not by number. These include Cobb in "Arrival", Alison in "The Schizoid Man", Monique in "It's Your Funeral" and Roland Walter Dutton in "Dance Of The Dead". Each is seen only in one episode.

== Penny farthing logo ==
Many items in the Village are branded with its logo, a canopied penny-farthing bicycle (commonly referred to as an "Ordinary"). It appears on the masthead of the daily newspaper, which is called the Tally Ho.

Almost all signs and objects are labelled in the same typeface, a modified version of the font Albertus.

== Filming locations ==
Scenes of the Village were filmed in the grounds of Portmeirion, an Italianate resort built by Clough Williams-Ellis in north Wales. Principal location shooting took place over four weeks in September 1966, with a return visit for additional, second unit-style shots for later episodes in March 1967. Sections of the resort (such as Number Six's residence interior with exterior) were sets at MGM Borehamwood Studios in England. Later episodes were shot almost entirely on the sets on MGM's sound stages and backlot and locations within easy reach of the studio at Borehamwood, (for example, in "It's Your Funeral", "A Change of Mind", "Living in Harmony", and "The Girl Who Was Death"), and by reusing Portmeirion footage from earlier episodes the production company was able to save the expense that further principal photography at Portmeirion would have led to.

Portmeirion had previously been used as a background in early episodes of Danger Man to show a foreign location – the episodes were "View From The Villa", "Under the Lake", "The Honeymooners", "Find and Return", "The Journey Ends Halfway" and "Bury the Dead".

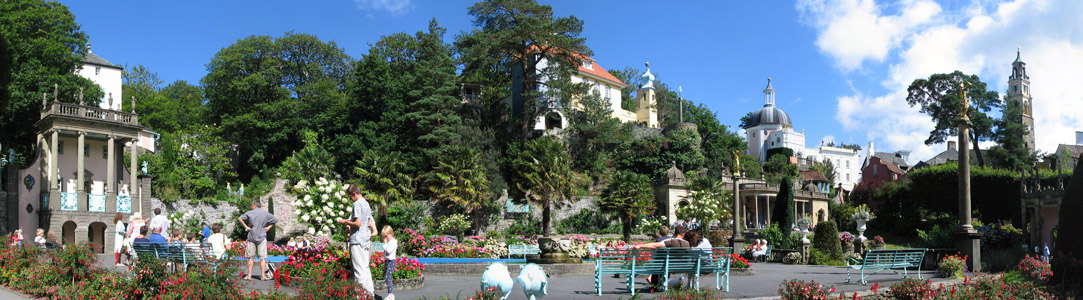
Panoramic view of the central piazza, Portmeirion Village

== Infrastructure ==
There is an extensive network of tunnels and caverns under the Village, connecting many of the public buildings, and a number of secret facilities and support services (plumbing, waste disposal, observation cameras, etc.). These are generally off-limits to all prisoners above, but they appear to be extensively utilised, given the amount of motorcycle traffic observed in them in the final episode. There appears to be a large liquid-filled underground chamber that resembles a lava lamp, probably a short distance off the coast, in which Rover – the Village's security guardian – resides when it is not being used. The normal background display of the large monitor in Number Two's office is a view of this chamber, and lava lamps are visible in virtually every public building in the Village.

The Village is a self-contained society, and appears to be mostly self-sufficient as well, although no farming areas are ever seen, so it appears that food and supplies are shipped in from outside. It is sprawling enough to contain several hundred prisoners, in a comfort level similar to that of a hotel or a resort. As seen in "The Girl Who Was Death", the population includes several children, implying that some prisoners are so resigned to their fates that they have married and started families.

The Village has its own daily newspaper (The Tally Ho), a cinema, a peripheral statue garden (though the statues are actually surveillance systems to prevent prisoners' escaping), a retirement home, a gymnasium, a fully equipped hospital, taxi service, a radio station (like George Orwell's telescreens in Nineteen-Eighty-Four, the receivers cannot be turned off), a television studio (used mostly for news reports and announcements), a restaurant, a music shop, several other stores, and its own graveyard. In addition, there are extensive recreation facilities. Although alcohol is officially outlawed in the Village, in one episode Number Six stumbles onto a hidden bar located in a cave on the beach, run by a single bartender and a home-made distillery that serves real alcohol. An old acquaintance he meets there informs him that the Village authorities tolerate its presence partially to mollify harder cases with alcohol, and because the proprietor is an eccentric genius who doodles groundbreaking equations when not serving customers, which the authorities periodically steal. The local economy functions on a credit chit system. The final episode also revealed that the Village conceals a missile launch facility deep underground.

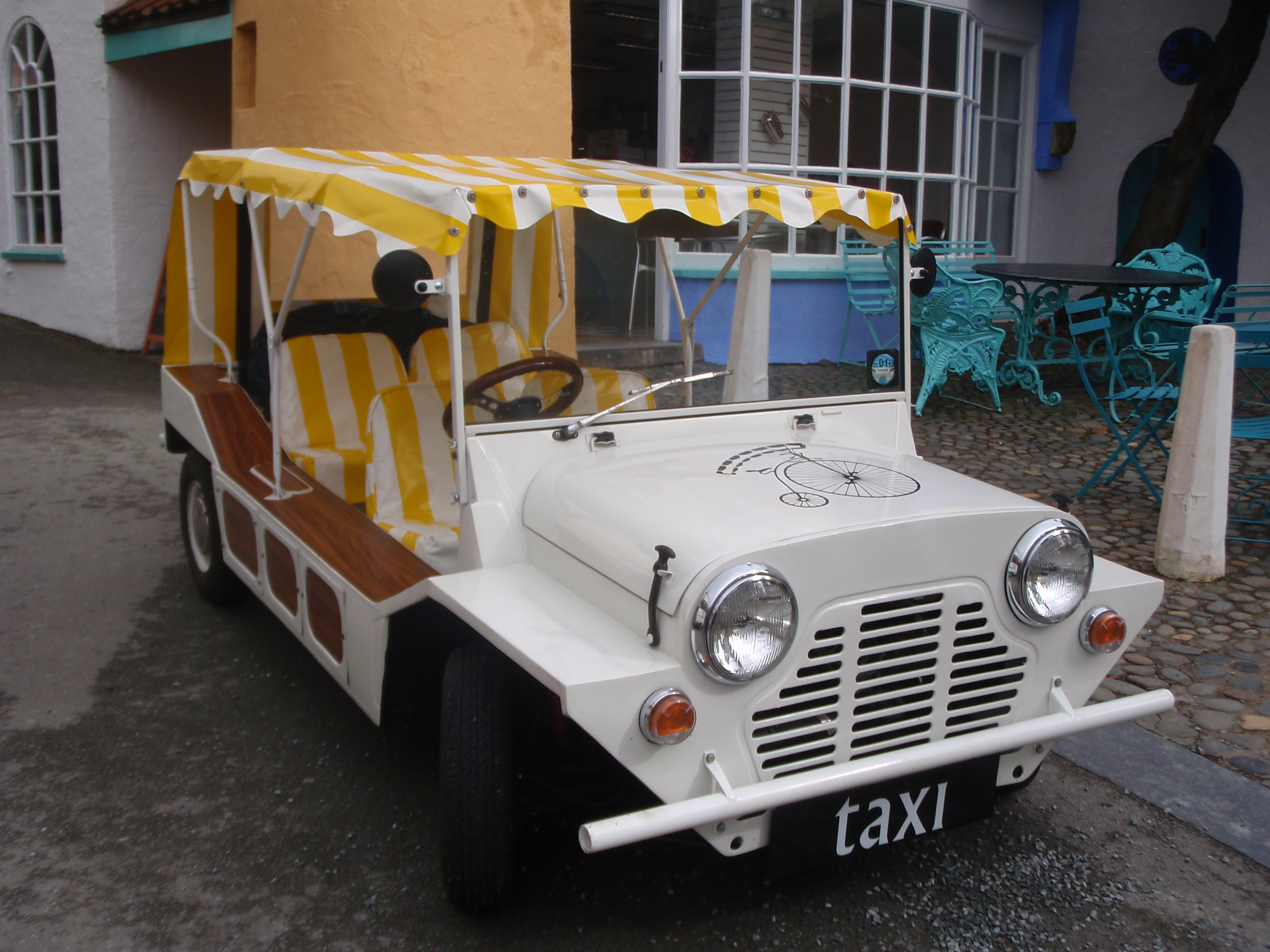
A taxi in the Village

The exact dimensions of the Village are never explicitly defined. Although a map of the Village is shown on screen on several occasions, it only seems to show the core residential and business area of the village, which is shown as being surrounded on three sides by mountain ranges and the fourth by "the sea". The episode "Living in Harmony" reveals that the Village is large enough to house a complete western town mock-up (presumably an area ear-marked for "official" use, and therefore not shown on the Village maps). Other episodes also indicate that the Village includes an expanse of beach and seaside cliffs (with caves). The jurisdiction of the Village over water is said to extend for several miles, or otherwise the range of Rover, the Village guardian system.

There is visual evidence in many episodes that the Village also includes large areas of countryside (with residences) as these are often visible in the distance in aerial shots and views looking out to sea.

The small Jeep-like vehicles used as taxis in the Village are Mini Mokes.

== Authorities ==
The Village's penny-farthing logo

Ostensibly, the Village is run by a democratically elected council, with a popularly elected executive officer known as "Number Two" presiding over it and the Village itself. Though most Village inhabitants seem to go along with this, internal dialogue indicates that the entire process is rigged:

Number Six: "Where'd you get this bunch of tailor's dummies?" (indicating the Council)

Number Two: "They'd be here when I arrived."

Whenever the council is seen, none of its members speak or move in any way.

In actuality, the Village is a brutal dictatorship, best described by Number Six himself as "This farce, this 20th century Bastille that pretends to be a pocket democracy." It is ruled by a revolving series of Chief Administrators designated "Number Two", some of whom return to the office after lengthy absences. They vary greatly in personality and in methodology: some of them are quite amiable, some are sadistic, and some are mere bureaucratic functionaries bordering on functional impotence.

Number Two appears to be directly answerable to unseen superiors, the shadowy "They" or "Number One" pulling all the strings from behind the scenes, with direct contact via a red phone. It appears that Number Two is continually being observed by hidden cameras, and indeed one of the Number Twos confides to Number Six in "The Chimes of Big Ben", "I'm as much of a prisoner here as you are. We're both lifers, my boy!" Whether Number Two literally means that he is a captive is not known for certain; several Number Twos are shown coming and going from the Village at will, and the very first Number Two, when he receives orders regarding his replacement in "Arrival", takes it calmly with understanding (as opposed to other Number Twos such as the one in "A. B. and C." who live in fear of such an order).

However, when the Number Two of "Chimes of Big Ben" returns in "Once Upon a Time", it is made clear that it is against his will. In the final episode, "Fall Out", Number Two makes it clear that he had been kidnapped in much the same way as Number Six, but chose to quickly give in instead of fighting his captors.

The episode "It's Your Funeral" suggests that most of the Number Twos encountered in the series are in fact only temporary appointments, standing in for an older Number Two who has been away from the Village for reasons not explained. This Old Number Two eventually returns, ostensibly in order to retire, but becomes the target of an assassination plot by the current "temporary" Number Two.

Exactly who operates the Village is deliberately obscured. It sometimes appears to be run by Communist types, suggesting it is a holding cell for captured western agents, but at others it appears to be operating with some assistance from British Intelligence, implying that it is a holding area for western agents who have been compromised, or are feared to be untrustworthy by their own agencies. Several of the Number Twos in the course of the show appear to be unclear as to whom they are actually working for, and one explicitly says, "It doesn't matter 'who' Number One is. It doesn't matter which 'side' runs the Village ... both sides are becoming identical. What in fact has been created here? An international community." Another Number Two implies that both East and West are covertly operating the Village together for unknown reasons. The overall impression given by the series is that some kind of nebulous organisation is manipulating all the Cold War powers for its own ends.

== Security ==
Weapons, alcohol, and tools are forbidden in the Village, but there are no walls or visible barriers to prevent escape, and no apparent prison guards. Indeed, aside from Number Two functioning as warden, the Village at first appears to have no real security infrastructure. This is merely a ruse, however, as subsequent episodes reveal that many of the other people in the Village are, in fact, warders planted unobtrusively in the community and reporting back to the current Number Two. It is strongly implied that "They" (the never-revealed masters of the Village) have several plants in the Village as well, whose identities are unknown to Number Two, and who report back to "Them" directly; one of the more sadistic Number Twos (seen in "Hammer into Anvil") is particularly paranoid about this possibility.

An underground control room monitors closed-circuit television cameras located throughout the Village. Observers continually spy on Villagers and foil escape attempts with the aid of Rover, a large white balloon-like device that chases would-be escapees. The perimeter of the Village is surrounded by a pleasant wooded area, including one or two caves (which may or may not connect to the network of tunnels). Beyond this, Rover patrols: If anyone ventures too far from town, they will be intercepted and nudged back towards the Village. If anyone attempts to escape, Rover will capture them and they wake up in the Village hospital. Rover has also been shown to kill on two occasions; the exact cause of death is not revealed (the target is "enveloped" / suffocated; this happens to the victims in "Arrival" and "The Schizoid Man"), however, in "Free for All", Number Six is attacked in a similar manner, but survives.

== Customs ==
Citizens use the phrase "Be seeing you" as a farewell, accompanied by a waving gesture consisting of thumb and forefinger forming a circle over the eye, then tipped forward in a salute. This may be a reminder that in the Village, one is under constant surveillance; anyone may be a warder, a stooge working for Number Two – although a simpler theory of the salute could be that the fingers are formed into the shape of a number six. In their book, The Official Prisoner Companion, Matthew White and Jaffer Ali state that actress Norma West said that McGoohan told her the gesture was used by early Christians; it was the sign of the fish (the documentary The Prisoner Video Companion, originally released on VHS in the 1980s and later on DVD by A&E, also makes this statement). In Danger Man and Secret Agent, John Drake uses that expression often.

Most (but not all) guards wear the same style of resort clothing and numbered badges as the prisoners, and mingle seamlessly among the general population. Thus, it is nearly impossible for prisoners to determine which Villagers can be trusted and which ones cannot.

== Fate ==
When last seen in the final episode, "Fall Out", the residents of the Village are evacuated by helicopter after Number Six primes a missile (located within a silo beneath the Village) to launch. The episode and the series never reveal what happens to the Village or its people after Number Six finally escapes.

The Village did appear again in a DC Comics mini-series based on the series published in the 1980s, which picked up the story 20 years later. In this version (published later as the graphic novel, Shattered Visage), the Village is abandoned and falls into disrepair. Number Six seemingly never left the Village, instead choosing a hermit-like existence as its Number One. This existence comes to an end when Number Two writes a book about the Village, inspiring a joint effort by American and British agents to investigate the site. However, a young woman washes ashore before their arrival, awakening to find herself dubbed Number Six. One and Six are able to establish an odd camaraderie before Two arrives, seeking to complete unfinished business. Ultimately, in this version of the story line, the Village is destroyed in a massive explosion.

In reality, Portmeirion continues to be a popular tourist attraction in north-west Wales, and frequently hosts events related to celebrating the series. It is also a popular destination for owners of Lotus / Caterham Seven cars, as driven by Number Six in the series. The building in Portmeirion shown in the series as Number Six's house was later converted into a shop selling Prisoner-related souvenirs, with a penny-farthing bicycle parked outside.

== In other media ==
In The Simpsons episode "The Computer Wore Menace Shoes", Homer Simpson is imprisoned in a location called "The Island" after accidentally uncovering a secret flu shot scheme. He escapes by stealing Number Six's raft (which he had spent thirty years building) and uses a spork to pop the Rover sent to capture him. Patrick McGoohan guest-starred in the episode, reprising the role of Number Six. It is revealed in this episode that the reason for Six's imprisonment was his invention of the bottomless peanut bag.

In the Lupin III Part 2 episode "The Sound of the Devil's Bells Call Lupin", Jigen and Goemon are captured and imprisoned in a village in the middle of nowhere called Gemarschaft, run by a mysterious nun called Sister Lavina, and after Jigen sends a distress call, Lupin comes to rescue them and finds out that Lavina has been using a hypnotherapy bell to brainwash the people trapped there so she can use them for a secret military project. Lavina uses Rover-like bubbles to capture people who try to escape.

In Alan Moore's crossover comic, The League of Extraordinary Gentlemen: Black Dossier, The Village is stated as having been built by the Thought Police to house enemies of Big Brother. After the death of Big Brother and the collapse of the Ingsoc regime, MI5 continues to operate The Village. In the comic, The Village is specifically stated as being located in Portmeirion.

In the TV series 2Point4 Children, the episode "Seven Dials" sees one of the main characters Ben played by Gary Olson wake up in the Village at a Prisoner convention, as part of an ongoing and increasingly surreal vendetta plot with rival plumber Jake Klinger, played by Roger Lloyd-Pack.

In the TV series The Invisible Man (2000), the episode "A Sense of Community" featured a village called "The Community" where troublesome spies were forced to 'retire'.

The Village is recreated in the late-1970s Edu-Ware computer game, The Prisoner and its sequel, Prisoner 2. In both games, however, the location is renamed "The Island".

In the 2009 remake, the Village is located in the middle of a desert, instead of by the sea, though it was later revealed that this version of The Village does not exist in reality, only in a virtual reality computer environment. The area that was used for filming was Swakopmund, Namibia.

Iron Maiden wrote a song that appeared on their 1982 release of The Number of the Beast called "The Prisoner". The group later wrote a second composition that appeared on the Powerslave album called "Back in The Village".

In the second volume of the Tales of the Shadowmen anthology series, Xavier Mauméjean's short story "Be Seeing You!" describes the origin of The Village. It was established in 1912 by Winston Churchill, the original Number 1, to interrogate his enemies, including Sherlock Holmes.

In the science fiction TV series Babylon 5, the culture of the Psi Corps organization pays homage to aspects of The Prisoner, including a modified salute and use of the phrase "Be seeing you".

In the three-part Pinky and the Brain special "Brainwashed", Pinky and The Brain are imprisoned on an island similar to The Village, where each captive dons a specific type of hat.
