= John Drake (Danger Man) =

Secret agent played by Patrick McGoohan in the British television series Danger Man

- Danger Man character
- First appearance: "View from the Villa"
- Last appearance: "Shinda Shima"
- Created by: Ralph Smart
- Portrayed by: Patrick McGoohan

In-universe information
- Gender: Male
- Occupation: Secret agent
- Nationality: Irish-American (1960–61 series); British (1964–66 series)

John Drake is a fictional secret agent, played by Patrick McGoohan in the British television series Danger Man (1960–1962, 1964–1966) (known in the US as Secret Agent).

== Overview ==
=== Nationality and employment ===
Drake's background was never explored in detail in the series, and also appeared to undergo an amount of retconning involving his nationality. In the first Danger Man series (1960–61), Drake speaks with a posh transatlantic accent, and is described as being an Irish American. In this series he's an operative working for a branch of NATO. In the second series (1964–66), Drake speaks with a less pronounced accent that is more British with Irish undertones (which was McGoohan's natural accent). In this later version, he works for a fictional British secret service branch called M9; no further reference is made to him being American. He is now said to be British, except in one episode in which he identifies himself as being Irish.

=== Personality ===
In both versions of the series, Drake is depicted as something of a lone wolf and a maverick. In one early episode, he initially refuses a mission that requires him to assassinate a man; he reluctantly takes the mission and is visibly upset when his target is accidentally shot during a struggle. Other episodes (particularly during the later series) have him clashing with his superiors, or at least strongly disagreeing with their methods. In the history of the series, Drake is shown only once intentionally shooting anyone to death, and then only in self-defence. (He is shown shooting people on another occasion, but only during a dream sequence; the aforementioned early episode shooting is depicted as being unintended). Drake was not opposed to using lethal force when absolutely necessary, however, and on rare occasions did kill villains using other methods (throwing off a train, causing the collision of two airplanes, etc.).

=== Associates ===
Drake is most often shown working alone, having received his orders from unidentified officials (or sometimes stumbling upon a case by himself). During the 1960–62 series, he is shown occasionally answering to a British superior named Hardy and in one episode Drake's Washington, DC office is shown and it is learned that he has a secretary. The first season of the 1964–66 series sees Drake receiving orders from Hobbs, a somewhat cold M9 official who is always seen fiddling with a letter opener. In the following season his superior is a former brigadier, Gorton. During the final full season, Drake is on his own, except for one episode in which he takes orders from an M-like character played by Bernard Lee who played M in many of the James Bond films. In one episode of the third series, viewers are introduced to a group of M9 technicians who support Drake's missions, including a Q-like gadget man and a wardrobe supervisor.

=== Romance ===
Drake is almost never shown becoming romantically involved with his leading ladies. This was a requirement put in place by McGoohan who did not want Drake to become a clone of James Bond in that respect. McGoohan allowed a couple of exceptions (particularly in two episodes guest starring Susan Hampshire, both of which imply Drake and the two different characters played by Hampshire continue a relationship "off camera") and there is a considerable amount of sexual tension present in other episodes. In "The Black Book", an episode in which Drake becomes attracted to a young woman involved in a spy ring, it is learned that Drake cannot allow himself to become involved with anyone due to his line of work; this is graphically illustrated in the American version of the opening credits which depict a female form being separated from Drake by a set of bars.

== The Prisoner connection ==
McGoohan denied that the character of Number Six in The Prisoner, the show that McGoohan did after Danger Man, was meant to be Drake. His co-creator of The Prisoner, George Markstein, claimed otherwise. The debate over the identity of Number Six stems from references in dialogue to the character being a former agent, the appearance of "Potter", a character from the final season of Danger Man, and the fact one episode ("The Girl Who Was Death") was based upon a script originally written for Danger Man. Interestingly, a member of the supporting cast for this episode was called ‘'John Drake'’. Some of the officially licensed novels based upon the series refer to Number Six as "Drake", including Number Two (1969) by David McDaniel which does so in the very first line of the book.
