= The Prisoner (2009 miniseries) =

2009 American miniseries

- Promotional poster
- Based on: The Prisoner by Patrick McGoohan; George Markstein
- Written by: Bill Gallagher
- Directed by: Nick Hurran
- Starring: Ian McKellen; Jim Caviezel; Hayley Atwell; Ruth Wilson; Lennie James; Rachael Blake; Jamie Campbell Bower
- Music by: Rupert Gregson-Williams
- Countries of origin: United States; United Kingdom
- No. of episodes: 6

Production
- Producer: Trevor Hopkins
- Running time: 45 minutes
- Production company: ITV Studios

Original release
- Network: AMC
- Release: November 15 – November 17, 2009
- Network: ITV
- Release: April 17 – May 22, 2010

The Prisoner is a 2009 six-part television miniseries based on the 1960s series. The series concerns a man who awakens in a mysterious, picturesque, but escape-proof village, and stars Jim Caviezel, Sir Ian McKellen, Ruth Wilson, and Hayley Atwell. It was co-produced by American cable channel AMC with British channel ITV, whose parent company holds the rights to the original series through ITV Studios. It received mixed reviews, with critics feeling that the remake was not as compelling as the original series.

== Plot ==
The series begins with an unidentified man waking up in the middle of a desert and finding himself witness to the pursuit of an elderly man, dressed in the style of the characters in the original TV series, by mysterious guards. The old man dies soon after, but not before asking the younger man to "tell them I got out."

Soon, he arrives in an enigmatic community, referred to by its many residents as simply "The Village". Everyone he meets is nameless, but known instead by a number; he is disconcertingly familiar to them, and learns his own number is "6". Everybody he meets appears ignorant of the outside world, and the contradictions this creates in some of their thoughts.

Number 6 also appears unable to remember his real name, and recalls only brief flashes of his former life in New York City. One recurring proto-memory is having met and seduced a mysterious woman in a diner—implicitly this happened very shortly before his awakening in The Village. He finds himself locked in a battle of wills against an individual called Number 2, who appears to be the Village's leader and who goes to great lengths to make Number 6 assimilate.

Number 6, meanwhile, tries to connect with "dreamers"—Village residents who, like him, have been experiencing dreamlike memories of their lives outside of the Village. Although distrusting of all villagers, he does befriend Number 147, a Village taxi driver, and Number 313, a doctor with whom he develops a romantic connection.

Number 2 invites Number 6 to spy on his fellow villagers under the tutelage of Number 909. Each man investigates the other and 2 investigates both—it appears as if all the villagers are spying on each other and privy to one another's foibles. Number 2's son, Number 11-12, is meeting secretly with 909, and feels compelled to cover up these interactions by literally stabbing him in the back.

As Number 6's memories return piecemeal, his former name (Michael) is revealed in apparent flashback, as are a series of encounters between him in New York and many of the villagers. It appears that Michael used to work for a secretive surveillance company, Summakor, from which he (like McGoohan's spy in the original series) had recently resigned.

Number 2 has a heavily-medicated wife, and a son—Number 11-12. His son also feels like a prisoner, and Number 6's influence leads him to question his own identity, sexuality and—prompted by 6's unwillingness to conform—even the reality of his existence. Michael's feelings about his casual liaison with the now-better-recalled Lucy prior to his awakening in the Village resurfaces when he is matched by a Village agency with his onsite soulmate, and she turns out to be the same woman. Lucy now calls herself Number 4-15, is blind and initially claims no memory of their previous encounter. Number 2 manipulates 313 into betraying 6's relationship by making her own feelings for him clear, even as mysterious sinkholes open up throughout the Village into which several inhabitants fall.

Number 6 and Number 2 engage in a psychological battle involving their doppelgangers, but their final showdown reveals their doubles to be unreal—either imagined or hallucinated, bringing 11-12's concerns about the very fabric of reality to the fore, and further his existential crisis.

The final episode sees Number 2 discuss Number 313's returning memories of being Sarah, an alleged mentally disturbed woman in Michael's reality. Heavy flashbacks detail Michael's meeting with his presumed superior, Mr. Curtis; Number 147 is his driver, and the two discuss brainwashing en route to Mr Curtis, the 'real' identity of Number 2. The time relationship of the memories is questioned—Number 6 tells Number 147 that their minds are being trapped while their bodies are elsewhere, suggesting myriad interpretations of the layers of reality.

Mr. Curtis introduces Michael to his wife, Helen Blake, who has been theorising about different levels of consciousness and whether it is possible to visit them, "tak[ing] with us all these broken people and let[ting] them fix themselves" in a situation focusing on the fundamentals of life. The Villagers are revealed to have been subjects of Michael, identified by his surveillance work.

The Village exists in Helen's mind, a precarious existence threatened when Number 11-12—having previously adjusted his mother's medication—assists in her suicide-death. Number 6 appears to be dying, sealing his fate and inability to escape. His planned funeral, however, is replaced with that of 11-12, who takes his own life. As Number 2's fictional perfect family life—and Village—crumble, he expresses a desire to cede control to Number 6-Michael, inviting Number 147 to support 6 as 'the One' capable of bringing clarity and morality to the Village—"freedom within the prison."

Mr. Curtis praises Michael's integrity, as he identifies people—including 909 and 554—who have been 'fixed' by the Village, further confusing the time frame of interactions and overlap between the parallel narratives. Number 2 explains to 6 that it is his fear of leaving that manifests as Rover (the odd white ball that acts as boundary-keeper to the Village environs).

Number 6 pleads with Number 2 to release the villagers before they succumb to the holes tearing apart the Village; instead, he reveals a version of the truth—that they are all prisoners—as Michael learns about Sarah, who also resisted the Village and sacrificed her sanity.

In New York, Michael agrees to help Curtis save Sarah; in the Village Number 147 leads the villagers to anoint Michael-6 as 'the one' to save it alongside Sarah-313, the dreamer capable of making the sacrifice to help him sustain the unreality and try to make a 'good Village'.

== Cast ==
=== Main cast ===
- Ian McKellen as Number 2 / Curtis
- Jim Caviezel as Number 6 / Michael
- Ruth Wilson as Number 313 / Sarah
- Jamie Campbell Bower as 11–12
- Hayley Atwell as 4–15 / Lucy
- Rachael Blake as M2 / Helen
- Lennie James as Number 147
- Renate Stuurman as 21-16

=== Guest cast ===
- John Whiteley as Number 93 – Episode 1, "Arrival"
- Jessica Haines as Number 554 – Episode 1, "Arrival"
- David Butler as Number 37927 / The Access Man – Episode 1, "Arrival" and Episode 5, "Schizoid"
- Jeffrey R. Smith as Number 16 – Episode 2, "Harmony"
- James Cunigham as Number 70 & Shadow Number 70 – Episode 2, "Harmony"
- Leila Henriques as The Winking Woman – Episode 2, "Harmony"
- Vincent Regan as Number 909 – Episode 3, "Anvil"
- Warrick Grier as Number 1955 – Episode 3, "Anvil"
- Lauren Dasnev as Number 1100 – Episode 3, "Anvil"
- Sara Stewart as Number 1894 – Episode 4, "Darling"

== Production ==
=== Background ===
A remake of the 1967 TV series The Prisoner had been in the works since 2005.

The miniseries was promoted at 2008 San Diego ComicCon via a skywriter airplane that sketched the phrase "Seek the Six" in the sky over San Diego. Although "Seek the Six" was initially thought to be a catchphrase of some sort, it did not appear in the final cut of the miniseries.

A further promotional event for the miniseries was held at the 2009 ComicCon, including a spoiler-heavy, 9-minute trailer and a cast and crew discussion panel.

=== Development ===
The Prisoner went into production in June 2008. Location filming for The Village was in Swakopmund, Namibia. A production diary is available. After 18 weeks of shooting, principal photography wrapped on December 12, 2008.

In an interview shortly after his death, Patrick McGoohan's widow said that producers of the new series had hoped that McGoohan would play a part in the revival:

They wanted Patrick to have some part in it, but he adamantly didn't want to be involved. He had already done it.

This was contradicted by Sir Ian McKellen in an interview featured in the November 2009 edition of SFX, where he was quoted as saying:

He was asked to be in the first episode, there being a part that would have been very ironically fitting, but apparently he said that he didn't want to do it unless he was offered the part of Number Two.

Producer Trevor Hopkins confirmed in an interview that he had invited McGoohan to play the role of the Number Six–like old man encountered by Caviezel's character early in the first episode. This is suggested by the jacket worn by the old man – the same style jacket as worn by Number 6 in the first series. McGoohan declined, but suggested he could play Number 2 instead.

=== Broadcast ===
The series premiered on November 15, 2009, as a miniseries on the AMC TV channel in the United States and Canada. It was also broadcast in the UK by ITV. The six-part series premiered in the UK on April 17, 2010. AMC's website streamed all 17 episodes of the original Prisoner series in advance of showing the remake.

AMC's original airing of the series combined the episodes, with episodes 1 and 2 airing on day 1, etc., with only one set of opening and closing credits for both. ITV broadcast the episodes individually, over six consecutive Saturday nights in the spring of 2010. The DVD release restores the 6-episode format.

== Episodes ==
Each episode title in the series is one word taken from an episode title from the original programme.

| No. | Title | Original series title which inspired this title | Original release date |
|---|---|---|---|
| 1 | "Arrival" | Arrival | November 15, 2009 |
Number 6 wakes up in the desert, where he sees an old man, Number 93, and several pursuers shooting at him. Number 93 is dragged into a cave by Number 6, where Number 93 tells Number 6 to "go to 554" before dying. Number 6 buries Number 93 and wanders into the Village, where he meets Number 2 and is grilled about the location of Number 93. He finds a confidant in Number 554, who is killed on Number 2's orders.
| 2 | "Harmony" | Living in Harmony | November 15, 2009 |
Number 6 struggles to find allies to escape from the Village. Number 2 introduces Number 6 to his brother's family to convince him he belongs. Number 6 had a brother who drowned in childhood. As Number 6 begins to doubt himself, his brother admits to the facade and the pair make a failed attempt at escape. His brother drowns in the attempt, following an encounter with Rover, but Number 6 finds renewed faith in himself. Meanwhile, Numbers 2 and 11–12 are seen discussing 11-12's apparent lack of childhood memories.
| 3 | "Anvil" | Hammer Into Anvil | November 16, 2009 |
Number 2 offers Number 6 the opportunity to become an undercover agent, spying on suspected dreamers. Number 6 accepts with ulterior motives. He works with Number 909, who is spying on him. Number 6 follows Number 909 into the Go Inside bar, where he finds him meeting with his secret lover, 11–12. He blackmails the two men. Rather than allowing the relationship to be discovered, 11–12 kills Number 909. Number 6 blackmails 11–12 to help him rescue Number 313, who has been captured and sent to the clinic.
| 4 | "Darling" | Do Not Forsake Me Oh My Darling | November 16, 2009 |
The Village Matchmaking Service targets Number 6, pairing him with a woman, 4–15. Number 6 recalls 4–15 from a brief encounter with his New York alter ego, Michael, shortly before he was taken to the Village. 4–15, however, pretends that she does not remember Number 6. They become lovers and plan to marry until Number 313 intervenes. 4–15 reveals to Number 6 that she is indeed Lucy, the woman Michael knew in New York; Number 2 has brought her to the Village to "break" his heart and spirit. 4–15 apparently dies by jumping into a bottomless pit that has appeared; in a concurrent flashback to New York, Lucy is apparently killed by an explosion in Michael's apartment.
| 5 | "Schizoid" | The Schizoid Man | November 17, 2009 |
Number 2 has embodied Number 6's animal desires in an identical double named 'Two Times Six'. Number 6 must find a way to reconcile himself with his desires or risk being manipulated by Number 2. Meanwhile, 11–12 confronts his mother, Number 313 sees more visions of her past, and Number 2 relaxes for a day as 'UnTwo'. In New York, Michael returns to Summakor to find answers. 11-12's mother reveals that bottomless holes appear when she is awake.
| 6 | "Checkmate" | Checkmate | November 17, 2009 |
Number 6 encounters new arrivals, which contradicts claims that no world exists. Number 2 shows off new houses, indicating the village is expanding. This is later revealed to be to increased pressure on Number 6 to replace Number 2 to stop the holes from destroying the village. Number 6 confronts Number 2 about the newcomers, but soon forgets as Number 2 reveals he has afflicted Number 6 with a disease that will kill him. Number 6 confronts 11–12 when he meets him at Number 909's grave and again at the Go Inside bar. 11–12 is unable to reconcile himself to his false identity. He proceeds to smother his dreaming mother and hang himself. In New York, Michael is escorted to a car so he may meet "Mr. Curtis". Events in New York and The Village begin to parallel each other, which Michael becomes increasingly aware of; he also encounters people in the real world who seem to be less tortured and more confident versions of people in the Village. Number 6's determination does not waver in the face of death and Number 2 allows him to live. In New York, Mr. Curtis, the real-world Number 2, introduces Michael to his wife, Helen, who, just as in the Village, is trapped in a sort of waking dream. Mr. Curtis explains that the Village is a form of therapy used to help people that Summakor has identified, although the “patients” may not have agreed to his procedure. It exists within the mind of Helen, who 'discovered' the Village—a dream present in everyone at a level of consciousness deeper than the subconscious—and was its first inhabitant. Michael was pulled into the Village because he worked so well at Summakor, finding people who needed 'help'. 11-12 is revealed to be the only resident of the Village who does not exist in the real world. Curtis' use of the Village was to work through his and Helen’s trauma of being childless, but the creation of the son threatened the Village's continued existence as it taxed Helen's mind to create someone new rather than engage existing minds. Neither could bring themselves to kill their son, but recent events have provided sufficient "rope" (inhuman behaviour including murder) that he hangs himself. At his son's funeral, Number 2 rallies the Villagers and tells them Number 6 is the only solution to the holes, while in New York, Curtis introduces Michael to Sara, the real world counterpart of Number 313, who is homeless and insane because of childhood trauma. Michael is overcome and desires to help Sara and the villagers and replaces Curtis as the head of Summakor. Number 313, having become aware of her real-world self, becomes the dreamer, freeing Helen to return to the real world. Number 6, now stuck in The Village for good as the new Number 2, begins planning how to 'do The Village right'. Number 313, the new unresponsive dreamer, sheds a tear.

== Reception ==
=== Critical response ===
The miniseries met with mixed reviews, scoring 46 out of 100 on Metacritic.

Los Angeles Times television critic Robert Lloyd wrote "why anyone, on either side of the screen, should be particularly interested in his fate, is never made clear nor compelling," and further states "the payoff is weak, and more than a bit daffy." In a comparison with the miniseries to AMC's hit series Mad Men, he writes "the difference [is] that 'Mad Men' is never boring."

In Entertainment Weekly, TV critic Ken Tucker writes "it lacks the wit and zip of the original Prisoner," and concludes "It's self-absorbed to the point of incoherence."

Chicago Sun-Times reviewer Paige Wiser declares "There's also a reason why I am not conking myself on the head with a croquet mallet, but The Prisoner somehow has the same effect," and with reference to viewing all six hours of the miniseries, concludes "I urge you to heed my advice: Opt out while you can."

San Francisco Chronicle critic Tim Goodman writes "The Prisoner is not compelling. It rambles too much. Its vagaries are not interesting, its unorthodox storytelling not special enough."

The New York Times reviewer Alessandra Stanley struck a contrary note: "This version of The Prisoner is not a remake, it's a clever and engaging reinterpretation by Bill Gallagher, who shaped the script to contemporary tastes and sensibilities — notably, a postmodern fatigue with ideology and big thoughts." She concludes "The 21st century adaptation pays only lip service to the human condition, and instead explores a power struggle between two human beings. It's unlikely to prove as lasting, but the new series still manages to be thrilling." Furthermore, it was positively reviewed in the Radio Times and also by Sam Wallaston who, writing for The Guardian, described it as "a triumph with something of The Truman Show about it" with "a tension and a claustrophobia that gnaw away at you, making you look at your own psyche."

=== Awards and nominations ===
| Year | Association | Category | Nominated artist/work | Result |
|---|---|---|---|---|
| 2009 | Satellite Award | Best Miniseries | The Prisoner | Nominated |
| 2009 | Satellite Award | Best Actor in a Miniseries or a Motion Picture Made for Television | Ian McKellen | Nominated |
| 2010 | PGA Awards | Television Producer of the Year in Longform | Michele Buck, Damien Timmer, Rebecca Keane, and Trevor Hopkins | Nominated |
| 2010 | Emmy Award | Outstanding Lead Actor in a Miniseries or a Movie | Ian McKellen | Nominated |
| 2010 | Emmy Award | Outstanding Cinematography for a Miniseries or a Movie | Florian Hoffmeister for the episode "Checkmate" | Nominated |
| 2010 | Art Directors Guild | Excellence In Production Design Award | Michael Pickwoad, Claudio Campana, Delarey Wagenar, Emilia Roux, and Delia de Villiers Minnaar | Nominated |
| 2010 | Saturn Award | Best Presentation on Television | The Prisoner | Nominated |

== Home media ==
=== DVD ===
In early 2010, Warner Home Video released The Prisoner in DVD format in Region 1/USA & Canada in a 3-disc collection.

Special features included deleted scenes for all episodes (including scenes from "Arrival" that explicitly indicate that 2 orders the bombing of the diner), and commentaries on "Arrival" and "Checkmate".

Featurettes in the set include:

- "A 6 Hour Film Shot in 92 Days: The Diary of the Prisoner" – behind-the-scenes documentary on the making of the series, featuring footage previously available online.
- "Beautiful Prison: The World of the Prisoner" – a second behind-the-scenes documentary.
- "The Prisoner ComicCon Panel" – Jim Caviezel, Lennie James, Bill Gallagher, and others discuss the then-upcoming series at the 2009 San Diego ComiCon.
- "The Man Behind 2" – Jamie Campbell Bower conducts a tongue-in-cheek interview with his TV father, Ian McKellen.

ITV Studios Home Entertainment released a UK DVD and Blu-ray Disc on 3 May 2010. The listed extras include the deleted scenes, ComicCon panel and McKellen interview, but differ otherwise. They include:

- "The Making of" for all six episodes
- "Inside The Prisoner" for all six episodes
- The Prisoner Read Through
- Character Profiles
