= The Chimes of Big Ben =

- The Prisoner episode
- Episode no.: Series 1 Episode 2
- Directed by: Don Chaffey
- Written by: Vincent Tilsley
- Production code: 5
- Original air date: 6 October 1967

Guest appearances
- Leo McKern; Nadia Gray

Episode chronology
← Previous "Arrival"	Next → "A. B. and C."

"The Chimes of Big Ben" is an episode of the allegorical British science fiction TV series, The Prisoner. It was written by Vincent Tilsley and directed by Don Chaffey and fifth to be produced. It was the second episode to be broadcast in the UK on ITV (ATV Midlands and Grampian) on Friday 6 October 1967 and first aired in the United States on CBS on Saturday 8 June 1968.

The episode starred Patrick McGoohan as Number Six and introduced Leo McKern as Number Two. McKern's Number Two would return for the last two episodes of the series.

== Plot summary ==
Number Six: Where am I?
Number Two: In the Village.
Number Six: What do you want?
Number Two: Information.
Number Six: Whose side are you on?
Number Two: That would be telling. We want information… information… information.
Number Six: You won't get it.
Number Two: By hook or by crook, we will.
Number Six: Who are you?
Number Two: The new Number Two.
Number Six: Who is Number One?
Number Two: You are Number Six.
Number Six: I am not a number! I am a free man!

— Number Six meets Number Two

The episode opens with the relentlessly cheerful voice of the radio announcer encouraging every Villager to participate in an upcoming crafts show. Number Six is playing chess near the beach when Number Two (Leo McKern) joins him. During their conversation, a helicopter lands and an unconscious woman (Nadia Gray) is taken out on a stretcher. Later, Number Six is invited to The Green Dome where he and Number Two watch the woman wake up on the main viewing screen. Number Two says that she is the new Number Eight and that she will be Number Six's new neighbour.

When Number Six returns to his cottage, Number Eight emerges, confused, and asks for directions to The Green Dome. When she returns later, she reveals to him that her name is Nadia, but she claims to be suspicious that he is a Village spy. The following day, Nadia tries to escape by swimming out to sea but is brought back by Rover and interrogated in the hospital. In response, Number Six makes a deal, agreeing to participate more in Village life – for instance, by entering the craft show – if this puts an end to her torture.

Number Six and Nadia become closer and eventually plan to escape. She tells him that she knows the location of The Village: On the Baltic coast of Lithuania about 30 miles (48 km) from the Polish border.

At the craft show (where every entry except Number Six's is a depiction of Number Two in some medium), Number Six presents his work, a multi-piece abstract sculpture called "Escape". He is then awarded first prize and uses the "work units" he has won to purchase a tapestry, the entry of one of the other prize winners. At night, he and Nadia escape in his exhibit, which is really a carved boat, using the tapestry as a sail.

When they reach land, they meet Nadia's contact. Number Six borrows the contact's watch as his own has stopped. Number Six and Nadia then hide in a packing case as they travel to London. They end up in Number Six's old office and meet his former bosses. When they suspect him of being a double agent, Number Six agrees to tell them why he resigned if Nadia is given protection.

However, as he is about to talk, Number Six hears the familiar chimes of Big Ben. He looks at his watch and finds that it shows the same time – not the one hour time difference if the contact had actually been from Lithuania/Poland. Realising he has been tricked, he begins a search of the office and discovers a tape recorder recreating the background sounds of London. He exits the building, finding himself back in The Village, with Nadia standing with Number Two – revealing she was an operative all along.

== Cast ==
- Leo McKern as Number Two
- Nadia Gray as Nadia
- Finlay Currie as General
- Richard Wattis as Fotheringay
- Angelo Muscat as The Butler
- Kevin Stoney as Colonel J.
- Christopher Benjamin as Number Two's assistant
- David Arlen as Karel
- Peter Swanwick as Supervisor
- Hilda Barry as Number 38
- Jack Le White as First Judge
- John Maxim as Second Judge
- Lucy Griffiths as Third Judge
- Fenella Fielding as The Announcer/Telephone Operator (voice only)

== Alternative version ==
During the production of the last four episodes of The Prisoner series (the episode "Living in Harmony" was being made) ITC arranged for a press conference to take place at MGM-British Studios in Borehamwood on 20 September 1967 - a week before the scheduled broadcast on some British TV channels. At the press coverage Patrick McGoohan (at the start wearing his kosho uniform, a made-up martial art used in the series) was interviewed inside the cage shown in the episode "Once Upon a Time". Also present was Angelo Muscat, the mute butler seen in many episodes and Alexis Kanner. Two episodes – "Arrival" and "The Chimes of Big Ben" – were shown to the press. The alternative version of "The Chimes of Big Ben" includes a sequence that was later cut where Number Six uses a triquetrum (an ancient Greek measuring device) to locate the general position of the Village. The end titles also finished with the smaller wheel of the penny-farthing resolving into the Earth while a galaxy of stars fills the bigger wheel and then the canopy on the bicycle. The Earth then expanded to a single word 'POP'.

== Broadcast ==
The broadcast date of the episode varied in different ITV regions of the UK. The episode was first shown at 7:30pm on Friday 6 October 1967 on ATV Midlands and Grampian Television, on Sunday 8 October on ATV London, Southern Television, Westward Television and Tyne-Tees; on Thursday 12 October on Scottish Television, on Friday 13 October on Anglia Television, on Thursday 26 October on Border Television and on Friday 3 November on Granada Television in the North West. The aggregate viewing figures for the ITV regions that debuted the season in 1967 have been estimated at 10.1 million. In Northern Ireland, the episode did not debut until Saturday 13 January 1968, and in Wales, the episode was not broadcast until Wednesday 14 January 1970.

== Sources ==
- Fairclough, Robert, ed. (2004). The Prisoner: The Original Scripts. Vol. 1. foreword by Lewis Greifer. Reynolds & Hearn. ISBN 978-1-903111-76-5. OCLC 61145235. – script of episode
