= Fall Out (The Prisoner) =

17th and final episode of The Prisoner

- The Prisoner episode
- Episode no.: Series 1 Episode 17
- Directed by: Patrick McGoohan
- Written by: Patrick McGoohan
- Production code: 17
- Original air date: 1 February 1968

Guest appearances
- Leo McKern as Number Two; Alexis Kanner as Number Forty-Eight; Kenneth Griffith as President; Peter Swanwick as Supervisor; Michael Miller as Delegate; Angelo Muscat as The Butler

Episode chronology
← Previous "Once Upon A Time"	Next → —

"Fall Out" is the 17th and final episode of the allegorical British science fiction series The Prisoner. It was written and directed by Patrick McGoohan, who also portrayed the incarcerated Number Six. The episode was first broadcast in the UK on ITV (and Scottish Television) on Thursday 1 February 1968 (it appeared on ATV Midlands and Grampian the day after) and first aired in the United States on CBS on 21 September 1968.

The episode omits the usual long opening sequence in favour of a recap of the penultimate episode, "Once Upon a Time". It is the only episode in the series in which the show's principal outdoors location, Portmeirion, is given a specific credit in the opening titles. This resulted from an agreement with Portmeirion's architect, Sir Clough Williams-Ellis, that the location would not be revealed until the series finale.

== Plot summary ==
After besting Number Two at a battle of wills in "Once Upon a Time" at the apparent cost of Number Two's life, Number Six requests he be taken to see Number One. He is taken by The Supervisor to a large cavernous chamber that includes a British assembly hall with a number of masked delegates, whom the Supervisor joins, and a large metallic cylinder with a mechanical eye, labelled "1". Number Six is shown to his seat, a large ornate throne, to watch the proceedings.

A master of ceremonies ("the President") announces Number Six has passed the "ultimate test" and won the "right to be individual", but there are matters of ceremony involved in the "transfer of ultimate power". The caged room where Number Two died is brought to the chamber with his body still in it; medical personnel recover the body, resuscitate him, and give Two a make-over. Number Two, along with Number Forty-eight—a young modishly-dressed man seen previous in the episode Living in Harmony—are presented as two different examples of "revolt" to the assembly. Number Forty-eight refuses to cooperate and drives the assembly to sing a rendition of "Dem Bones" before he is restrained. Number Two reveals he too was abducted to the Village and spits at the mechanical eye in defiance. Both men are taken away.

The President then presents Number Six as a third form of revolt, but as "a revolutionary of a different calibre" to be treated with respect. Number Six is shown his home in London is being prepared for his return, and he is presented with a million pounds in traveller's cheques, petty cash, a passport, and the keys to his home and car. The President says Number Six is free to go home or go wherever he wants, but requests that Number Six stay and lead them as his behaviour has been so exemplary. The President then asks Number Six to address the assembly, but as he begins each sentence with "I" the assembly drowns him out with shouts of "Aye! Aye! Aye!..."

Patrick McGoohan as Number One

Number Six is shown into the metallic cylinder. Having descended a level, he passes transparent tubes holding Numbers Two and Forty-eight along with a third, empty tube, each labelled as "Orbit"; the third tube has no number. Climbing a stairway, he finds a robed man in a mask and a circled "1" watching surveillance videos of Number Six. Number Six pulls off the mask to find a gorilla mask underneath, and then under that, a man seemingly identical to Number Six. The robed figure escapes into a hatch above. Number Six locks the hatch and recognises the cylinder is a rocket like the one in the episode The Girl Who Was Death. He initiates its countdown, sending the President and Assembly into a panic, and an evacuation of the Village is ordered.

Number Six frees Numbers Two and Forty-eight, and along with the Butler, they gun down armed guards, making their way to the caged room which is revealed to be on the bed of a Scammell Highwayman low loader. They drive away from the Village as the rocket launches from the abandoned Village. Rover (the security of the Village) deflates and is destroyed (to the accompaniment of "I, Yi, Yi, Yi, Yi (I Like You Very Much)") upon exposure to the flames of the rocket's exhaust.

The four drive towards London. Nearing the city, Number Forty-eight alights and hitch-hikes, without regard for direction. Just outside the Palace of Westminster, the truck is stopped by the police. The three abandon it and leave their separate ways. Number Two enters the Palace by the Peers' Entrance, while the Butler escorts Number Six back to his home, where his Lotus 7 car waits, and the Number 1 appears on his door. Number Six sets off in his car, while the Butler enters Number Six's home, its door opening in the same manner as the automatic doors in the Village. The episode ends with the thunder claps from the series' opening sequence, as well as with the opening shot of Number Six driving on an open country road.

== Cast ==
- Patrick McGoohan as Number Six
- Leo McKern as Number Two
- Alexis Kanner as Number Forty-Eight
- Kenneth Griffith as the President
- Peter Swanwick as the Supervisor
- Angelo Muscat as the Butler
- Michael Miller as Delegate

== Themes ==
=== Self imprisonment ===
Number One was depicted as an evil, governing force in this Village. So, who is this Number One? We just see the Number Twos, the sidekicks. Now this overriding, evil force is at its most powerful within ourselves and we have constantly to fight it, I think, and that is why I made Number One an image of Number Six. His other half, his alter ego.

— Patrick McGoohan in 1977

The allegorical shift that takes place once the identity of Number One is revealed has been subjected to various interpretations. McGoohan commented that it means to say that "Each man is a prisoner unto himself". The episode's ending, with Six's flat door opening automatically, as in the Village, suggests that he is still not free. The final scene, being the same as the first scene of the series, implies that the series is a cycle that is about to repeat itself, supporting the idea that Six cannot be free from captivity. McGoohan commented on the final scene that it is meant to show that "freedom is a myth," and there is no final conclusion to the series, because "we continue to be prisoners".

== Production ==
=== Writing ===
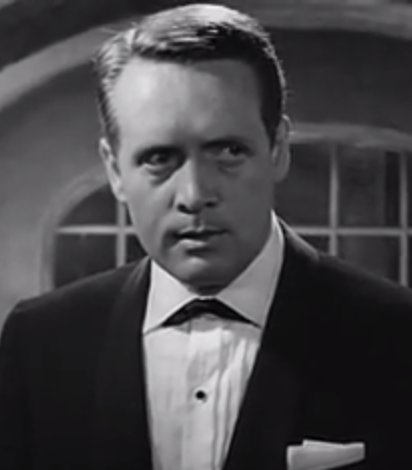
"There are numbers here, there are no names, so you can't expect it to end like James Bond, so you have to have an allegorical ending. Now (...) what is the most evil thing on earth? Is it jealousy? Is it hate? Is it revenge? Is it the bomb? What is it? When one really searches it's only one thing, it's the evil part of oneself that one is constantly fighting until the moment of our demise. The Jekyll and Hyde if you like, but on a much larger scale." —Patrick McGoohan

Lead star and series creator Patrick McGoohan wrote and directed the episode. As ITC managing director Lew Grade said in the 1984 documentary Six into One: The Prisoner File, McGoohan, despite having promised earlier that he would conceive an ending for the series, came to him admitting that he was unable to come up with an ending. The biggest problem was revealing the identity of Number One, which, as McGoohan and various other crew members admitted, had not been decided on prior to the writing of the final episode's script.

According to the book The Prisoner by Robert Fairclough, McGoohan was informed that production was cancelled on the series immediately following filming of the preceding episode to be produced, "The Girl Who Was Death", and was given only a week to write a finale to conclude the storyline started in "Once Upon a Time", which had been filmed a year earlier. Fairclough's account is, however, in contradiction to virtually all others, which state that McGoohan knew when he left for America to act in the Hollywood film Ice Station Zebra that there would be only four more episodes produced from that point, starting with "Do Not Forsake Me Oh My Darling" during his absence and ending with a finale; indeed, most agree that this last happened because a scheduled production break was scrapped when two series of 13 episodes were reduced to one of seventeen due to ITC chief Lew Grade deciding that the actor/producer was taking too long and spending too much money.

In order to save time and cut costs, "Fall Out" reused several sets from "Girl", most notably the rocket control room. Two guest actors from the episode, Kenneth Griffith and Alexis Kanner, were also recruited to play different characters in "Fall Out". This was, in fact, Kanner's third appearance on the series in only a few weeks; he had previously played Number Eight alias "The Kid/Number 8" in the Western-themed episode "Living in Harmony" as well as his uncredited role of the Photographer in "Girl". According to both Fairclough and Kenneth Griffith, McGoohan was so pressed for time that the actor was asked to write his own dialogue. While Leo McKern's Number Two is the same character that previously appeared, Kanner's Number 48 is almost certainly a different character from those he played in "Living in Harmony" (where his character in fact dies) and "The Girl Who Was Death", but it is unclear whether Griffith's character is the same one that was the Number Two in the latter episode. It was, however, not unusual in The Prisoner for actors to play different characters in different episodes.

McGoohan receives no onscreen acting credit in this episode. The episode opens with the series title superimposed over the first moments of the "Once Upon a Time" recap, with the location credit, episode title, guest stars, David Tomblin's producer credit and McGoohan's "written and directed by" credit over aerial footage of Portmeirion following that sequence. At the end, after the names of Kanner, McKern, and Muscat appear as captions over the actors themselves (still in character), an extreme aerial shot of the Lotus on London streets (the driver is not actually recognisable) is captioned simply, "Prisoner". Nor does McGoohan receive his usual executive producer credit; in "The Girl Who Was Death" it is replaced with a large "Patrick McGoohan as The Prisoner" credit, but here his name appears onscreen only as writer/director.

== Broadcast ==
The broadcast date of the episode varied in different ITV regions of the UK. The episode was first shown on Scottish Television on Thursday 1 February 1968, on Friday 2 February on ATV Midlands and Grampian Television, on Sunday 4 February on ATV London, whose broadcasts were also taken up by Southern Television, Westward Television and Tyne-Tees; on Friday 9 February on Border Television, on Saturday 10 February on Anglia Television and on Friday 1 March on Granada Television in the North West. The aggregate viewing figures for the ITV regions that debuted the season in 1967 have been estimated at 9.8 million. In Northern Ireland, the episode did not debut until Saturday 13 April 1968, and in Wales, the episode was not broadcast until Wednesday 15 April 1970.

== Reception ==
When the last episode came out in England, it had one of the largest viewing audiences, they tell me, ever over there, because everyone wanted to know who Number One was, because they thought it would be a ‘James Bond’ type of Number One. When they did finally see it, there was a near-riot, and I was going to be lynched. And I had to go into hiding in the mountains for two weeks, until things calmed down.

— McGoohan in 1977

At the time "Fall Out" was first broadcast, there were only three television channels available in the UK and it was claimed that the long-awaited final episode of the series had one of the largest viewing audiences yet seen. However, this seems unlikely given that, like other ITC programmes, the show was screened in the various ITV regions at varying times on varying days; it was not networked. As home video was unavailable at the time, some viewers missed the fleeting glimpse of Number One's face, which was only four seconds long.

The finale intentionally avoided answering any mysteries regarding the origins of the Village, its intentions for Number Six and his reasons for resigning; there is also no clear explanation for why the Village releases Number Six. The episode depicts Numbers Six, Two, 48 and the Butler shooting their way out of the Village; this is in stark contradiction to the previously established absence of weapons in the Village and its impenetrable security. The Village's proximity to London in the finale is also confusing and unexplained (especially since the Village escapees all use helicopters as if it were an island). This resulted in bafflement and anger among the show's viewership to such an extent that McGoohan had to leave the country and go "into hiding" for a few days as dissatisfied viewers stormed his house.

Despite this, McGoohan stated in a 1977 interview that he was "delighted" with the reaction, as his intention was to create controversy. He explained that his enjoyment with the outrage was in line with the show's message, "as long as people feel something, that's the great thing, it's when they're walking around not thinking, not feeling, that's though, that's where all the dangerous stuff is, cause when you get a mob like that, you can turn them in to the sort of gang that Hitler had". The popular press joined in with the public indignation at this "rubbish" McGoohan had foisted on them. Although it is sometimes claimed that McGoohan never worked in the UK again after this, this is untrue as, for example, he starred in the Channel 4 production The Best of Friends (1991), and also appeared in the film Mary, Queen of Scots (1971), which was partially filmed in the UK. He did, however, tend to work in American television thereafter, including a Prisoner-tinged appearance on Columbo a few years later.

Series co-creator George Markstein, who had left the show after episode 13, expressed dislike for "Fall Out" in the documentary Six into One. Markstein called it "an absurd pantomime" and "gross self-indulgence" and "a horrific joke."

In 2001, TV Guide listed "Fall Out" as the 55th Greatest TV Episode of All Time.

== Sequels in other media ==
There have been two licensed sequels to this episode in other media, plus one that is implied to follow on from its story.

- The Prisoner: I Am Not a Number, a 1969 novel by Thomas Disch, is set after this episode and has Number Six living in London with the Butler as his servant, but Number Six's memories of the Village have been erased. The novel suggests that this episode was a hallucination during the memory erasure process. The amnesia itself is a Village plot to manipulate Six into regaining his memories and inadvertently reveal secrets he would otherwise guard. However, Disch's novel additionally suggests that the Village may be a dream, a state of consciousness, a set of false memories or a virtual reality simulation. It is left to the reader to wonder which of these theories may be true.
- The 1988 comic book sequel, Shattered Visage, declares that this episode was a drug-induced psychodrama in which Number Two staged his own death and resurrection, and that the onscreen images are part of the Degree Absolute process that began in the previous episode, "Once Upon a Time". It offers two contradictory accounts, however: Number Two claims that in this episode, "The man that would not bend simply broke. Shattered and alone, he chose a number and christened himself Number One. He had accepted. He was ours, body and soul. We had won!" In contrast, a British intelligence officer reviewing the Village files reports, "Number Six made several attempts to escape. The administration, in turn, interrogated him repeatedly. And, as far as I can tell, he did not talk."
- A 2018 comic book miniseries, The Prisoner: The Uncertainty Machine (Titan Comics), does not feature Number Six (despite images of Patrick McGoohan from the series used on the covers of each issue), but is set in the present day in the same continuity of the TV series and as such is implied to take place after the events of "Fall Out".

== Sources ==
- Fairclough, Robert, ed. (1 February 2006). The Prisoner: The Original Scripts. Vol. 2. foreword by Roger Parkes. Reynolds & Hearn. ISBN 978-1-903111-81-9. OCLC 61145235. – script of episode
- Britton, Wesley Alan (2004). Spy Television. Greenwood Publishing Group. ISBN 9780275981631.
