= The Girl Who Was Death =

- The Prisoner episode
- Episode no.: Series 1 Episode 15
- Directed by: David Tomblin
- Written by: Terence Feely
- Production code: 16
- Original air date: 18 January 1968

Guest appearances
- Kenneth Griffith; Justine Lord

Episode chronology
← Previous "Living in Harmony"	Next → "Once Upon a Time"

"The Girl Who Was Death" is an episode of the allegorical British science fiction TV series The Prisoner. It was written by Terence Feely and directed by David Tomblin and was the sixteenth produced. It was broadcast in the UK on ITV (Scottish Television) on Thursday 18 January 1968 (and a day later on ATV Midlands and Grampian) and aired in the United States on CBS on 7 September 1968.

The episode starred Patrick McGoohan as Number Six and Kenneth Griffith in the first of two episodes he appeared in. According to several sources, including The Prisoner by Robert Fairclough, this episode was adapted from an unused, two-part script originally commissioned for Danger Man.

== Plot summary ==
A cricket match ends in a player (Colonel Hawke-Englishe) being assassinated with a bomb disguised as a cricket ball. Number Six is on an operational assignment, but it is unclear whether this is "real time", pre-The Village, or possibly another induced hallucination.

Secret messages are passed to him at a shoeshine box by Potter. In a record shop, he receives an assignment to find a Professor Schnipps who has been working on a rocket that will destroy all of London. It turns out that Colonel Hawke-Englishe was investigating the matter, which is why he was assassinated. He picks up where Colonel Hawke-Englishe left off in another match, but manages to avoid the same fate. He finds a note to meet a mysterious person at the local pub; while there, he drinks from a glass that says You have just been poisoned. He then drinks numerous spirits to vomit out the poison.

When he goes to the restroom, he gets another message to meet at the Turkish bath. While he is relaxing, a mysterious figure locks his stall and places a plastic dome over his head. Avoiding death, he now gets another message to go to the carnival, to the local fight.

At the fight, he is picked for the next match and told by his opponent (whom he beats) to go to the tunnel of love. He then hears the voice of a woman, which is a recording in his boat that is rigged with explosives. He tracks down, and is tracked by, a seductive woman called Sonia, who identifies herself as "Death". She drives away from the amusement park, with Number Six in pursuit.

They come to an abandoned village, where Sonia has set traps. He evades all of them, goes into a shed to avoid being shot, and drives a bulldozer to try to reach Sonia. Sonia destroys it with a rocket launcher and departs, assuming she has killed Number Six.

Number Six tracks Sonia to a lighthouse where Schnipps (dressed as Napoleon) and his associates are based. His lieutenants are dressed in Grande Armée uniforms and represent an apparently anti-London alliance composed of Scottish, Welsh, Irish, and Northern (particularly Yorkshire) marshals.

Number Six sabotages their firearms and German-style grenades, rigging them to backfire or malfunction. Captured, Number Six is tied up and left inside the lighthouse, which is revealed to be the rocket. As it is about to launch, he frees himself and desperately manipulates the rocket's controls, causing it to blow up without launching, killing his enemies, while he escapes in their boat.

In the end, it turns out that the adventure was nothing but a bedtime story, which Number Six was telling to some children in the Village nursery. Number Two (who looks like Schnipps) and his assistant (who looks like Sonia) were hoping that he would drop his guard and reveal some clue as to why he resigned. Number Six, after sending the children to bed, turns to the hidden camera and cheekily wishes, "Good night, children... everywhere."

== Additional guest cast ==
- Kenneth Griffith as Schnipps/Number Two
- Justine Lord as Sonia/Assistant
- Christopher Benjamin as Potter
- Michael Brennan as Killer Karminski
- Harold Berens as Boxing M.C.
- Sheena Marshe as Barmaid
- Max Faulkner as Scots Napoleon
- John Rees as Welsh Napoleon
- Joe Gladwin as Yorkshire Napoleon
- Alexis Kanner (uncredited) as Photographer

=== Locations ===
The cricket match shown at the start of the episode was filmed at four locations with the main sequences shot at Eltisley in Cambridgeshire, and stock footage at Meopham Green, Meopham, Kent on the A227 Gravesend to Tonbridge Road.

The lighthouse is Beachy Head Lighthouse. The fairground scenes were filmed in the former Kursaal Funfair in Southend-on-Sea, some of which appear in the episode as back projections.

== Broadcast ==
The broadcast date of the episode varied in different ITV regions of the UK. This was the first episode that was not shown first on ATV Midlands and Grampian Television (who picked up ATV Midlands' broadcasts), since they had been forced to delay their broadcasts to accommodate the fact that the series finale "Fall Out" would not be ready for screening on Friday 19 January as planned. As a result, ATV Midlands took a two-week hiatus from broadcasting The Prisoner after airing "Living in Harmony" on 29 December 1967. The final two colour episodes of Danger Man (its abbreviated fourth season) that had originally been planned to air after "Fall Out" were brought forward and screened on ATV Midlands and Grampian on Friday 5 and 12 January 1968. Anglia Television, which had been broadcasting The Prisoner on Saturdays, one week behind ATV Midlands, also took a two week hiatus after broadcasting Living in Harmony on 6 January.

This delay meant that ATV Midlands and Grampian were no longer leading the series' broadcasts; the episode was first shown on Scottish Television Thursday 18 January 1968, on Friday 19 January on ATV Midlands and Grampian Television, on Sunday 21 January on ATV London, whose broadcasts were also taken up by Southern Television, Westward Television and Tyne-Tees; on Friday 26 January on Border Television on Saturday 27 January on Anglia Television and on Friday 16 February on Granada Television in the North West, which had also taken a two week hiatus from broadcasting The Prisoner. The aggregate viewing figures for the ITV regions that debuted the season in 1967 have been estimated at 8.9 million. In Northern Ireland, the episode did not debut until Saturday 6 April 1968, and in Wales, the episode was not broadcast until Wednesday 8 April 1970.

== Sources ==
- Fairclough, Robert, ed. (February 2006). The Prisoner: The Original Scripts. Vol. 2. foreword by Roger Parkes. Reynolds & Hearn. ISBN 978-1-903111-81-9. OCLC 61145235. – script of episode
