= Rover (The Prisoner) =

Fictional entity from the 1967 British television programme The Prisoner

- The Prisoner television series element
- Rover, shortly after rendering Number Six unconscious on the beach outside the Village.
- First appearance: "Arrival"; 29 September 1967

Rover is a plot device from the 1967 British television programme The Prisoner, and was a crucial tool used to keep 'prisoners' from escaping the Village. It was depicted as a floating white balloon that could coerce, and, if necessary, incapacitate or kill recalcitrant inhabitants of the Village. It also had the ability to subdivide. Several aspects of the Rover device were left unexplained and to the imagination of the viewer.

The name "Rover" was only used once in the entire series, in the episode "The Schizoid Man". The novel The Prisoner: Number Two by David McDaniel, based upon the series, uses the name Guardian.

== Portrayal ==
=== Description ===
Rover was depicted as a large white inflatable balloon, not quite fully inflated, with a flexible skin. Rover would often produce a muffled roar sound when attacking. It would also sometimes emit a strange light display or luminescence from its interior. Once released, Rover could bounce and glide across the land and sea for a long range and at high speed, faster than a vehicle or boat.

Rover behaves as if it were a self-aware or quasi-intelligent entity and can interact with its surroundings, as well as adjusting to and anticipating the actions of Number 6 and other characters. No apparent direct control was ever shown to be exerted over it by the controllers of the Village, other than to release it. Rover would occasionally be seen outside its normal environment, sitting placidly in rooms, in Number 2's chair, roaming the streets of the Village, or being studied by unidentified persons in "secret" areas of the Village.

Rover possessed considerable strength, and was able, if necessary, to incapacitate people either by blunt force impacts, or through suffocation by absorbing or engulfing them.

=== Operation ===
In the first episode the rest of the villagers freeze when instructed as Rover appears and attacks an unidentified man who does not comply. The same scenario reappears at the start of "Checkmate", the ninth episode, except that this time the man who does not comply is not attacked by Rover, prompting Number 6 to follow him and discover the human chess game, a key event in the episode.

The use of Rover appeared to be both intimidatory and functional. Following encounters in the early episodes, where Rover physically interacts with prisoners, the Number 6 character gradually gives up trying to defeat Rover directly, and its mere presence is often enough to achieve its objectives.

While Rover primarily prevented escapes, it also served as a guard agent or herder when a character was required to take a certain action or direction, or to prevent their access to some part of the Village. In the cases where Rover incapacitated a prisoner, it also appeared that it had the capability of transporting their limp body. Occasionally, if attacking somebody in the water, the incapacitated victim (including Number 6 on one occasion in "Free for All" and Number 8 in "The Chimes of Big Ben"), would be carried back to the shore by what appeared to be three smaller Rovers.

Rover could be summoned at the direction of the control room, by declaring an Orange Alert. A stock scene of its inflation is shown before its appearance, although this sequence could also be omitted with Rover appearing spontaneously. It would be inflated beneath the sea, although its first appearance came as being inflated from the Village fountain. No explanation was ever made as to where Rover went after its mission had been completed, aside from a single scene in "Free For All" where Rover appears to return to the bottom of the sea (simply a reverse reel of the spawning sequence).

=== Plot device ===
Several aspects of how Rover worked were never revealed in the series beyond the primary actions in subduing prisoners, in which task it was apparently extremely effective.

Open questions surrounding Rover suggest that its use in the series was a variation of the deus ex machina type of plot device, used as a means to give a reason as to why the Village is so successful in coercing the inhabitants and preventing escape, without having to waste screen time explaining this method. The other methods of control of the Village, such as surveillance, mind-control and double agents, are explored in much more detail in the TV series than is Rover.

== Production ==
Rover was originally supposed to have been a robotic, wheeled device with a siren. It resembled a circular inflatable swimming pool topped with a black-and-white segmented dome with a blue flashing light at the top. Although a prop was constructed, it did not work properly, due to the driver of the small go-kart within having very poor visibility. In some interviews, Patrick McGoohan claimed that it was not seaworthy, and sank in the waters off Portmeirion during the initial stages of filming, but this story has been said to be untrue and just made up. Bob Monks, a second unit cameraman, confirms this in the documentary 'The Prisoner – behind the scenes'.

The final version of Rover was inspired by a weather balloon seen above Portmeirion by production manager Bernard Williams. The balloon was dragged across the set with wires, with the wires and the attachment point sometimes being visible. Several approach scenes were filmed through the use of reversing a film of the balloon being towed away from the camera, although the balloon was often also filmed from the side being towed in direction of travel.

Rover is last seen in "Fall Out". While the rocket is being launched, Rover drops down a hole to a cave-like area, where it shrinks to a small size and becomes still as if it is deactivating itself now that it is no longer needed in the Village. Alternatively, Rover may have been destroyed by the blast of the rocket or missile exhaust. However, this scene was not in the script and was inserted to give Rover its finale.

== Cultural references ==
Rover has become an icon of the series, and has been referred to numerous times in popular culture, such as in the Simpsons episodes "The Joy of Sect" (where it envelops Hans Moleman) and in The Prisoner parody episode "The Computer Wore Menace Shoes" (in which Homer simply pops it with a plastic spork, thus prompting Number 2 to question its effectiveness).

An episode of Lupin III Part 2 is a full homage to The Prisoner. The antagonist uses Rover-like bubbles to sweep up any escapees from Gemarschaft, and carries them back to the village so they can be stoned to death by the brainwashed masses, as Lupin witnesses when he enters looking for his captured friends.

The DVD box set of the series includes an advertisement for Renault cars (not Rover cars, as has been widely reported), in which a man in Prisoner style clothing escapes from the Village by outmaneuvering a version of Rover depicted not as a balloon, but a large solid white ball.

The writers of the television series Lost have made mention on numerous occasions that Rover was the inspiration for the "Smoke Monster."

Rover appeared in the 1984 CP/M edition of Crowther and Woods' Colossal Cave text adventure game, either in the Vault (player gives wrong magic word) or the Computer Center (player takes posters from the wall).

In Mystery Science Theater 3000's presentation of Laserblast, Tom Servo identifies an inflated white pool toy as "Rover from The Prisoner!"

In Xavier Mauméjean's short story, "Be Seeing You!", from the second volume of the Tales of the Shadowmen anthology series, the original Rover from 1912 is made of metal and propelled by steam, and is stated as being designed by the character of Cavor from H. G. Wells' novel The First Men in the Moon.

Rover appears in Liverpool quartet Clinic's video for their single "Harvest".

Rover also appears in the third-season episode "Number 7" of the animated series ReBoot. The entire episode is an homage to The Prisoner that culminates with the older version of the Enzo character meeting his younger self. At the end of this meeting, young Enzo throws a small Rover at his older self. It grows in size and envelopes the older in the same manner as in The Prisoner: with the face outline and monster-like roar.

In the 1980s video game Impossible Mission by Epyx software there are several rooms you must pass through which have a large floating ball that slowly follows you. This was made as a reference to Rover.

In the episode "From the Confidential Casefiles of Agent 22" of the 2017 animated series DuckTales, a bubble-like entity wearing a "jaunty hat" guards the villainess's lair. This character, referred to by the creators as the "Troub-bubble", is an homage to Rover, and is one of many references to 1960s spy fiction throughout the episode.

== In the 2009 remake ==
Rover appears in the 2009 miniseries remake of The Prisoner. This version of Rover is only ever referred to by Two as "The Beast". It is much larger than the original, described as being more of a presence than a material thing. In the final episode, The Beast is revealed to be an embodiment of 6's hidden desire to stay in the Village, thus stopping any attempt at escape made by himself or others.
