= Once Upon a Time (The Prisoner) =

- The Prisoner episode
- Episode no.: Series 1 Episode 16
- Directed by: Patrick McGoohan
- Written by: Patrick McGoohan
- Production code: 6
- Original air date: 25 January 1968

Guest appearance
- Number Two: Leo McKern

Episode chronology
← Previous "The Girl Who Was Death"	Next → "Fall Out"

"Once Upon a Time" is the penultimate episode of the allegorical British science fiction TV series The Prisoner. It was written and directed by Patrick McGoohan and sixth to be produced. It was first broadcast in the UK on ITV (Scottish Television) on Thursday 25 January 1968 (it appeared on ATV Midlands and Grampian the day after) and first aired in the United States on CBS on Saturday 14 September 1968.

The episode starred Patrick McGoohan as Number Six and re-introduced Leo McKern as Number Two. McKern's Number Two had previously appeared in "The Chimes of Big Ben" and would also appear in the last episode, "Fall Out". The main theme of the episode is the use of regressive therapy to break Number Six's will.

== Plot summary ==
The Number Two from the earlier episode "The Chimes of Big Ben" (Leo McKern) returns to the Village. He calls his superiors and obtains permission to undertake a dangerous technique called "Degree Absolute" in a final attempt to break Number Six and learn why he resigned from his position as an intelligence agent. Number Six is put into a trance state, causing his mind to regress back to his childhood. He is taken to the "Embryo Room", deep below the Green Dome, filled with various props, as well as a caged room that contains living space and a kitchen. He, Number Two, and the Butler (Angelo Muscat) are subsequently locked into the room via a timer that will unlock the room after one week.

Number Two uses regressive therapy following Shakespeare's Seven Ages of Man, using the various props to enact a series of psychodramas, with Number Two playing the authority figure (e.g., father, headmaster, employer) and Number Six the subject (child, student, employee). Each drama is aimed at trying to make Number Six explain why he resigned. During the first six of these, Number Two finds Number Six has developed an aversion to saying the word "six". Number Two also comes to like and respect Number Six as he learns more about him.

On the final day, Number Two enacts the role of military jailer, harshly interrogating Number Six as a prisoner of war. Number Two's efforts seem to have effect as Number Six starts to blather on reasons for resigning, but he becomes concerned when Number Six says he knew too much, including about Number Two. Number Two becomes agitated, and Number Six continues to call him a fool and an idiot. Suddenly, Number Six counts down from six, and by the time he has reached zero, has regained full control of his mind. Already exhausted from his efforts, Number Two is shocked. Now in control, Number Six explains that Degree Absolute, a well-known psychiatric technique, has its risks to the one performing the therapy if they have their own psychological problems. Number Six shows this understanding in a brief role reversal (by asking Number Two "Why don't you resign?"), much to Number Two's delighted amusement.

Number Two recovers and joyfully offers Number Six a tour of the Embryo Room. They end at the door timer, finding only five minutes remain before the room unlocks. Number Two becomes scared and pleads with Number Six to tell him why he resigned. Number Six remains quiet as Number Two goes to the kitchen area and pours them both a glass of wine. Number Six suddenly closes the door to the caged area, locking a panicked Number Two inside. The Butler takes the key from Number Two. Number Two paces the caged area while a voice screams "Die, Six, die!", until the timer runs out. Number Two falls over, apparently dead. The door to the Embryo room opens where the Supervisor (Peter Swanwick) waits. He tells Number Six they will need the body and then asks Number Six what he wants. Number Six only replies "Number One", and the Supervisor offers to take him there. He, Number Six, and the Butler depart the room.

== Cast ==
- Patrick McGoohan as Number Six
- Leo McKern as Number Two
- Peter Swanwick as the Supervisor
- Angelo Muscat as the Butler
- John Cazabon as the umbrella man

== Production ==
A working title of this episode was "Degree Absolute". It was originally reported to be the final episode of the first of two series of thirteen episodes, but when ITC and McGoohan renegotiated to make just seventeen episodes, the closing was refilmed and it was held back to become the first half of a two-part series finale. However, the original script has been published, containing that ending.

According to the 2007 documentary Don't Knock Yourself Out, during filming of the episode both McGoohan and McKern became totally engrossed in their roles and almost achieved a near-psychotic state (cited by various people, including Leo McKern). According to The Prisoner: The Official Companion to the Classic TV Series by Robert Fairclough, the strain of filming this episode caused McKern to suffer either a nervous breakdown or a heart attack (accounts differ), forcing production to stop for a time.

Angelo Muscat (the Butler) received "Guest Star" billing for this episode. John Maxim's brief scene as Number Eighty-Six was cut from the episode; however, he is still listed in the credits.

== Broadcast ==
The broadcast date of the episode varied in different ITV regions of the UK. The episode was first shown on Scottish Television Thursday 25 January 1968, on Friday 26 January on ATV Midlands and Grampian Television, on Sunday 28 January on ATV London, whose broadcasts were also taken up by Southern Television, Westward Television and Tyne-Tees; on Friday 2 February on Border Television, on Saturday 3 February on Anglia Television and on Friday 23 February on Granada Television in the North West. The aggregate viewing figures for the ITV regions that debuted the season in 1967 have been estimated at 9.2 million. In Northern Ireland, the episode did not debut until Saturday 6 April 1968, and in Wales, the episode was not broadcast until Wednesday 8 April 1970.

== In popular culture ==
This episode is referred to by Number Two in the 1988 comic book sequel Shattered Visage, when asked by Alice Drake whom Six killed.

== Bibliography ==
- Fairclough, Robert, ed. (February 2006). The Prisoner: The Original Scripts. Vol. 2. foreword by Roger Parkes. Reynolds & Hearn. ISBN 978-1-903111-81-9. OCLC 61145235. – script of episode
