= Number Six (The Prisoner) =

Character in The Prisoner

- The Prisoner character
- Patrick McGoohan as Number Six.
- First appearance: "Arrival" (1967)
- Last appearance: "Fall Out" (1968)
- Created by: Patrick McGoohan; George Markstein
- Portrayed by: Patrick McGoohan (original series); Nigel Stock (original series, episode: "Do Not Forsake Me Oh My Darling"); Jim Caviezel (2009 series)
- Voiced by: Mark Elstob (Big Finish)

In-universe information
- Gender: Male
- Occupation: Village resident
- Nationality: British (original series); American (2009 series)

Number Six is the central character in the 1967–1968 television series The Prisoner. The unnamed character in the original TV series was played by series co-creator Patrick McGoohan. For one episode, "Do Not Forsake Me Oh My Darling", Number Six was portrayed by Nigel Stock due to McGoohan being away filming the movie Ice Station Zebra.

In the AMC remake, Number Six is played by Jim Caviezel; in the Big Finish Productions audio series of 2019, Number Six is voiced by Mark Elstob.

== Biography ==
Much of Number Six's background is kept a mystery during the series, including his name, his job and whom he worked for. In the first episode, it is stated that he was born on 19 March 1928, the same date as McGoohan, and that he held a position of some responsibility with the British government. Certain clues though can be determined from some episodes where Number Six knows and appears to have worked for people in British Intelligence.

=== Life before The Village ===
During the episode "Once Upon a Time", Number Six undergoes an intense form of brainwashing and interrogation in which his mind is reverted to that of a child and he is made to relive major events of his life.

Among the events presented is the suggestion that, as a young man, Number Six caused a fatal car accident by speeding. It is also suggested that he attended some sort of private school and was once punished for not telling the headmaster about some of his friends' rule-breaking activities. Later in the episode, it is also stated that Number Six was a bomb-aimer during "the War", and that he worked for a British banking firm before being enrolled in a top secret government job.

Other episodes suggest that he was a spy or similar operative, though director Alex Cox stated in his 2017 book I Am (Not) A Number: Decoding The Prisoner that he was in fact a rocket engineer who resigned from his work because he felt his research was being misused. He is shown to be highly sagacious, if not a genius, with proficiency and expertise in subjects ranging from fencing, boxing and marksmanship to mathematics, languages, astronomy and craftsmanship.

Prior to his capture and internment in the Village, he was engaged to be married to Janet Portland, the daughter of his superior, Sir Charles Portland, although it is unclear if this is a planted memory.

=== Life in The Village ===
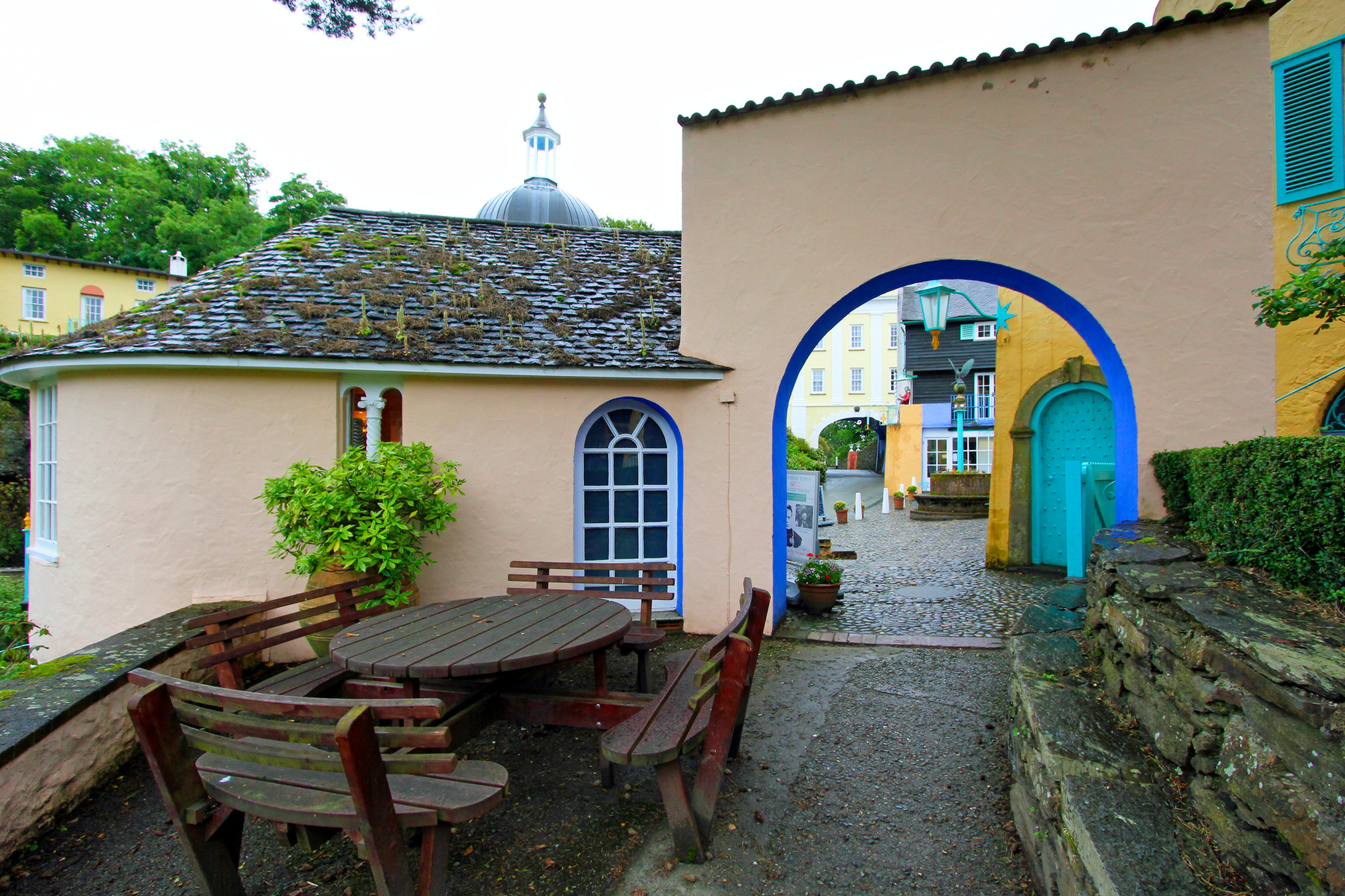
"The Prisoner" : the house of number 6 (Portmeirion)

After abruptly and angrily resigning from his highly sensitive government job, he prepares to go on a trip. While packing his luggage, he is rendered unconscious by knockout gas piped into his home in Westminster. Upon waking, he finds himself in a recreation of the interior of his home, located in a mysterious coastal settlement known to its residents as "the Village". The Village is surrounded by mountains on three sides and the sea on the other.

In subsequent episodes, Number Six becomes acquainted with the residents, hundreds of people from all walks of life and cultures, all seeming to be peacefully and mostly enjoyably living out their lives. They do not use names, but have been assigned numbers, which, aside from designations such as Two, Three, and Six, give no clue as to their status within the Village. Most are captives, but some are guards. Prisoners, therefore, have no idea whom they can and cannot trust. He is assigned Number Six but refuses to accept the designation: "I am not a number! I am a free man!"

Although the residents can freely move about the Village, they are constantly under the surveillance of numerous high-tech monitoring systems and cannot leave. Security forces, including a balloon-shaped automaton called Rover, recapture or kill those who attempt to escape.

I will not make any deals with you. I've resigned. I will not be pushed, filed, stamped, indexed, briefed, debriefed, or numbered! My life is my own.

— Number Six in the first episode "Arrival"

Number Six is a particularly important target of the constantly changing Number Two, the Village administrator, who acts as an agent for the unseen Number One. Number Two uses techniques such as hallucinogenic drugs, identity theft, mind control, dream manipulation and forms of social indoctrination and physical coercion in an attempt to make Number Six reveal why he resigned from his position. The position of Number Two is assigned to a different person in each episode, with two making repeat appearances. This is assumed to be part of a larger plan to disorient Number Six, but sometimes the change of personnel seems to be the result of the failure of the previous incumbent, whose fate is unknown.

Number Six, distrustful of everyone in the Village, refuses to co-operate or provide the answers they seek. He struggles, usually alone, with various goals, such as determining for which side of the Iron Curtain the Village functions, if either, remaining defiant to its imposed authority, concocting plans for escape, learning all he can about the Village, and subverting its operation. His schemes lead to the dismissals of the incumbent Number Two on several occasions. Despite foiling the system, however, Number Six never manages to successfully escape. By the end of the series, the administration, becoming desperate for Number Six's knowledge, as well as fearful of his growing influence in the Village, takes drastic measures that threaten the lives of Number Six, Number Two, and the entire Village.

A major theme of the series is the conflict between individualism, as represented by Number Six, and collectivism, as represented by the Village. According to McGoohan, the series aimed to demonstrate a balance between the two ideologies.

=== Ultimate fate ===
In the final episode, "Fall Out", Number Six and several other residents appear to have escaped the Village. However, his ultimate fate is not revealed, and McGoohan repeatedly maintained in interviews that Number Six does not have his freedom at the end of the series. The last shot of the series is of Angelo Muscat (the butler of Number Two, The Village's overseer) entering Number Six’s house in the City of Westminster, and the door of the house automatically opening and closing like that of his house in The Village.

== Adaptations and remakes of Number Six ==
=== Shattered Visage ===
In the late 1980s, DC Comics published Shattered Visage, a four-issue comic book based on The Prisoner, with events taking place twenty years after the television series. The first official follow-up to the TV show, it was illustrated by Mister X creator Dean Motter and co-written with Mark Askwith.

In the mini-series, Alice Drake is shipwrecked on the shores of the Village and meets an older Number Six, the single resident of the Village.

=== 2009 mini-series ===
The Prisoner was remade in a 2009 mini-series produced by AMC with Jim Caviezel playing the part of Number Six. Despite receiving mixed reviews, the remake was nominated for several awards, including an Emmy for Outstanding Lead Actor in a Miniseries or a Movie and Outstanding Cinematography for a Miniseries or a Movie.

== Fan theories ==
=== John Drake ===
Many fans of The Prisoner believe that Number Six is really John Drake, the title character of McGoohan's prior series Danger Man. McGoohan always denied the theory; in a 1966 interview in The Los Angeles Times, he stated that "John Drake of Secret Agent [as Danger Man was known in the US] is gone." Furthermore, McGoohan stated in a 1985 interview that Number Six is not the same character as John Drake, adding that he had originally wanted another actor to portray the character.

However, script editor George Markstein, who co-created the series with McGoohan, always claimed that Number Six is John Drake. According to Markstein, he conceived The Prisoner as a sequel of Danger Man when McGoohan resigned from the role.

Novels based on the series by Thomas Disch and David McDaniel also connect John Drake to Number Six, though these are generally not considered canonical. McDaniel's novel refers to Number Six as "Drake" from its very first sentence: "Drake woke."

While John Drake and Number Six look identical and have the same moral integrity, profession, skills, and mannerisms, some differences are noteworthy. Drake is a less emotional, more restrained character, while Number Six has a tendency to act out in anger. Drake is also a regular smoker and drinker, while Number Six smokes only twice in The Prisoner and claims to rarely drink.

=== Number 93 ===
In the opening moments of the 2009 mini-series, Michael, the amnesiac who would be known in that series as Six, discovers an old man in the middle of the desert being fired upon by security forces in some kind of an escape attempt. The old man is dressed in Number Six's trademark black sweater jacket with white trim, now displaying a badge that identifies the wearer as "93". 93's final words were "Listen to me: tell them all that I got out… be seeing you." Six later explores 93's apartment, which is identical to Number Six's from the original series. Producer Trevor Hopkins stated on a ComiCon panel that he had invited Patrick McGoohan to play the role of 93; McGoohan declined, suggesting that he could play Two instead (the role of Two went to Ian McKellen).

== In popular culture ==
- The Simpsons episode "The Computer Wore Menace Shoes", parodies The Prisoner, with McGoohan reprising his role as Number Six and Homer Simpson as Number Five.
- Number Six, played by Tricia Helfer, is a character on the television series Battlestar Galactica. According to Battlestar Galactica: The Official Companion, it is a tribute to the original character.
- In the second volume of the Tales of the Shadowmen series, Xavier Mauméjean's short story, entitled "Be Seeing You!", has Sherlock Holmes in the role of the original Number Six.
- Several Iron Maiden songs allude to the original series. In the song, "The Prisoner", lines from the original series are played at the beginning of the song. The Village is also the setting of their song "Back in the Village."
- UK indie rock act Mansun's second album, Six, is heavily inspired by the series as the band's former frontman Paul Draper is a big fan of the show.
