= George Markstein =

British journalist and thriller writer (1926–1987)

- Markstein, interviewed in 1984 for the Channel 4 documentary "Six into One"
- Born: 29 August 1926 Berlin, Germany
- Died: 15 January 1987 (aged 60) England, United Kingdom
- Occupation: Screenwriter and television producer.
- Period: 1966–1986
- Genre: Drama, adventure, science fiction

George Markstein (29 August 1926 – 15 January 1987) was a British journalist and writer of thrillers and teleplays. He was the script editor of the British series The Prisoner for the first thirteen episodes, and appeared briefly in its title sequence. Markstein also wrote for or story-edited other television series, specialising in espionage stories, and jointly ran a successful literary agency for screenwriters.

== Life and work ==
In 1926, according to his friend Sidney Allinson, writing in "George Markstein and The Prisoner", Markstein was born in Berlin, Germany, but emigrated with his Jewish family to England with the rise of Nazism. It is likely that he lived in the United States during his youth, then moved to Britain. Markstein worked as a newspaper reporter for the Southport Guardian of Southport England in 1947.

Markstein later became a journalist for the American military tabloid, the Overseas Weekly. Due to its scandal-driven content, the paper's U.S. G.I. readership referred to the paper as the Over Sexed Weekly. The masthead of the newspaper lists Markstein as head of the London desk.

He moved into television, first on the factual series This Week, before acting as story consultant and contributing to multiple episodes of ITC's Court Martial (1966), and then joining Danger Man as story consultant for the last black-and-white episode (1966), then story editor for the two episodes which were made in colour (1967). Around this time he also wrote four episodes for Rediffusion's children's drama series Send Foster (1967), and worked on the script for Peter Yates's Robbery (1967), a fictionalised feature film based on the 1963 Great Train Robbery.

=== The Prisoner ===
The man behind the desk (Markstein) in the opening title sequence of The Prisoner

When Patrick McGoohan announced his decision to leave Danger Man, Markstein edited the basic ideas that McGoohan had worked on since 1962 that became The Prisoner series,. Together with producer David Tomblin and the star McGoohan (uncredited), Markstein co-wrote the first story "Arrival," and then settled in as script editor for the series. He later described the job of story editor as "the key man in any series, he is the man in whose hands is the ethos of the series, the spirit of the series, and it is his job to cast the writers and the authors the way a director casts the actors and the stars".

Markstein makes a fleeting appearance at the start of almost every episode of The Prisoner – as the balding, bespectacled 'man behind the desk', to whom McGoohan's character is seen angrily handing his letter of resignation; and played the same, non-speaking character in the episode "Many Happy Returns".

Markstein's view of the series was for a more-or-less conventional action/espionage story. However, since McGoohan controlled the series as Executive Producer and owner of Everyman Films, Markstein became increasingly dissatisfied as an employee and ultimately left the series after the conclusion of the initial block of thirteen episodes. A glimpse of Markstein's face remained in the opening credits, but it was without him that McGoohan took the series to its most surreal and existential levels in the final four episodes, and to its bizarre conclusion.

=== Later work ===
After The Prisoner, Markstein joined the new Thames Television, initially as an in-house script editor, then as story editor for the first series of a counter-espionage drama Special Branch (1969); the third and final fourth series of spy drama Callan (1970, 1972); several episodes of Armchair Theatre (1969, 1971); and the first series of The Rivals of Sherlock Holmes (1971). He also acted as producer for the first series of Man at the Top (1970–71), a continuation of the story begun with John Braine's 1957 Room at the Top. Markstein became Thames's Head of Script Development, where he had input into the development of the 1974 Armchair Cinema season made by Thames's film subsidiary Euston Films, including one-off drama Regan and its celebrated successor series The Sweeney.

Markstein again went freelance, and co-wrote the screenplay for The Odessa File (1974), based on the novel by Frederick Forsyth. In the same year, together with Jacqui Lyons, he co-founded the literary agency, Marjacq Scripts Ltd, initially to represent screenwriters, later also thriller writers and computer game authors. The name is a derived from Markstein's surname and Lyon's forename.

In addition to his interests in Marjacq, Markstein also wrote several thrillers, including The Cooler (1974), The Man From Yesterday (1976), Chance Awakening (1977, basis of the screenplay Espion, lève-toi by Yves Boisset), the historical epic Tara Kane (1978), Goering Testament (1978), Traitor for a Cause (1979), Ultimate Issue (1981), Ferret (1983), and Soul Hunters (1987).

He continued to write for television, including working on two series of Shades of Greene (1975–76) for Thames, a series of adaptations of short stories by Graham Greene, for which Markstein acted as script consultant jointly with Greene's brother, former director-general of the BBC, Sir Hugh Greene. Other series he wrote episodes for included Return of the Saint (1978), the pilot (Storyboard: The Traitor) and two further episodes of Mr. Palfrey of Westminster (Thames, 1983, 1984, 1985), and one episode of Philip Marlowe, Private Eye (Thames, 1986). His final television work was as story editor on the six part series London Embassy (Thames, 1987), based on a book of short stories by Paul Theroux about the unusual experiences of an American diplomat based in London.

For the cinema he wrote the initial synopsis for the 1982 SAS embassy-storming film Who Dares Wins, which was then turned into a novel The Tiptoe Boys in thirty days flat by author James Follett and then into a screenplay by screenwriter Reginald Rose. James Follett, who began writing professionally in 1973, has described George Markstein as his "guru", and is still represented by Markstein's company Marjacq.

Following a long illness, Markstein died of kidney failure in 1987.

== Works ==
=== Novels ===
- The Cooler (1974)
- The Man From Yesterday (1976)
- Chance Awakening (1977)
- Tara Kane (1978)
- The Goering Testament (1978)
- Traitor for a Cause (1979)
- Ultimate Issue (1981)
- Ferret (1983)
- Soul Hunters (1987)

== Writing credits ==
Production	Notes	Broadcaster
Court Martial	"All Roads Lead to Callaghan" (1966)	ITV
Danger Man	"Not So Jolly Roger" (1966)	ITV
The Prisoner	"Arrival" (co-written with David Tomblin, 1967)	ITV
Send Foster	"Hole in the Road" (1967); "The Peg" (1967); "Off the Record" (1967)	ITV
Robbery	Feature film (co-written with Edward Boyd and Peter Yates, 1967)	N/A
Special Branch	"Troika" (1969); "Smokescreen" (1969); "Short Change" (1969); "Dinner Date" (1970); "The Pleasure of Your Company" (1970); "Not to Be Trusted" (1970); "Fool's Mate" (1970)	ITV
Callan	"The Richmond File: Call Me Enemy" (1972)	ITV
The Odessa File	Feature film (co-written with Kenneth Ross, 1974)	N/A
Return of the Saint	"The Debt Collectors" (1978)	ITV
Storyboard	"The Traitor" (1983)	BBC1
Dramarama	"Snoop!" (co-written with James Doran, 1984)	ITV
Mr. Palfrey of Westminster	"Once Your Card Is Marked" (1984); "Official Secret" (1985)	ITV
Philip Marlowe, Private Eye	"Spanish Blood" (1986)	ITV

== Awards and nominations ==
Year	Award	Work	Category	Result	Reference
1968	Writers' Guild of Great Britain Award	Robbery (shared with Edward Boyd and Peter Yates)	Best British Original Screenplay	Won	
