= Peter Swanwick =

British actor (1922–1968)

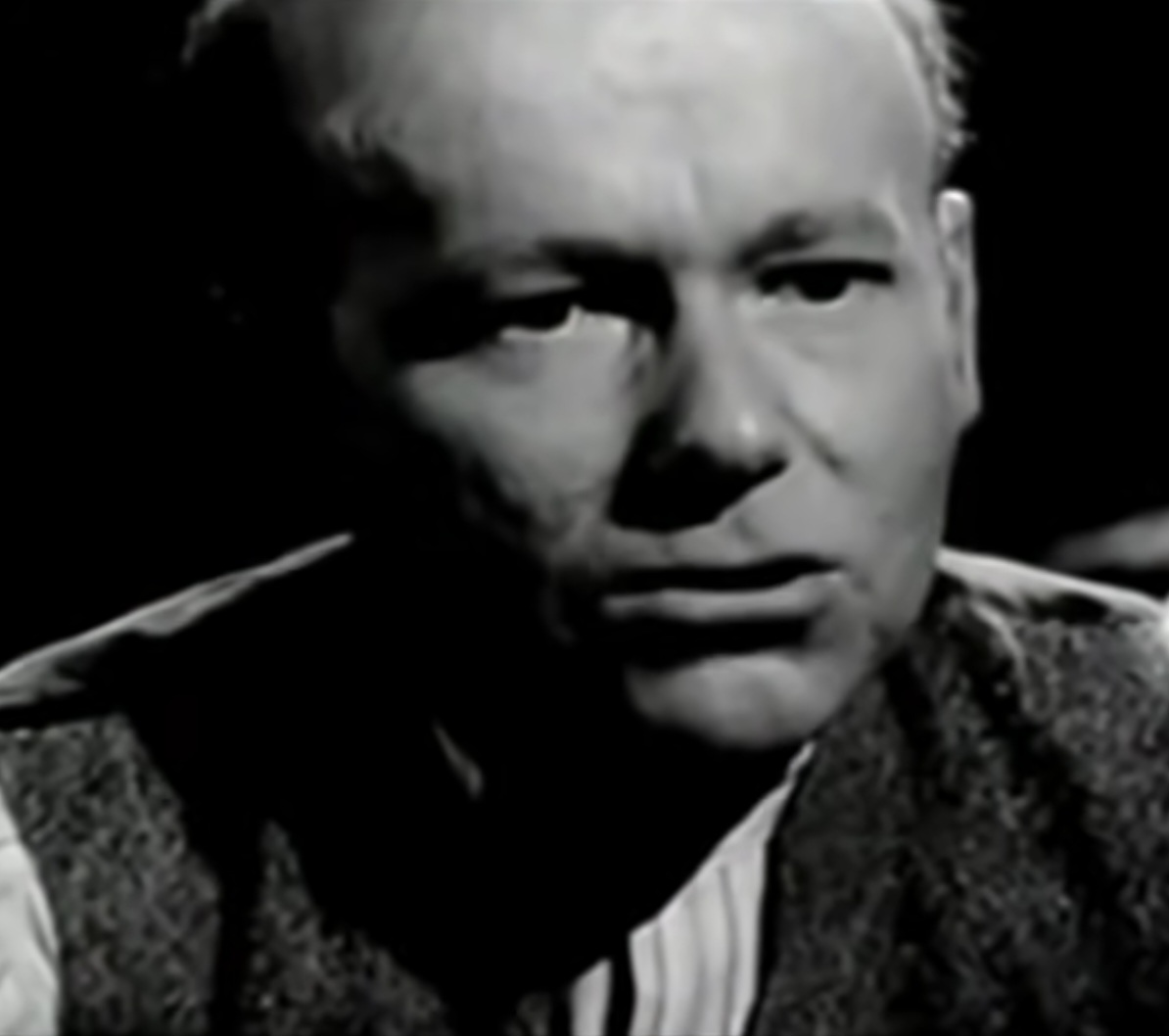
- Swanwick in the TV series One Step Beyond, episode "The Sorcerer", 1961
- Born: Walter Peter Swanwick; 29 September 1922; Nottingham, Nottinghamshire, England, UK
- Died: 14 November 1968 (aged 46); London, England, UK
- Occupation: Actor
- Years active: 1951–1968

Walter Peter Swanwick (29 September 1922 – 14 November 1968) was a British actor best remembered as the "Supervisor" (sometimes called the Controller) in the 1967 TV series The Prisoner.

Swanwick's film career began with bit parts in films such as The African Queen (1951), and he became a recognisable face on British TV during the mid-1960s when he featured in a number of series, including The Avengers and Danger Man, where he first worked with Patrick McGoohan, who later co-created and starred in The Prisoner.

Swanwick had major health problems in the 1960s that resulted in his undergoing multiple operations and leaving him with a short time to live.

Swanwick played the non-singing part of Herr Zeller in the original London stage production of The Sound of Music.

== Selected filmography ==
- Lilli Marlene (1950) – Chief Interrogator
- Madame Louise (1951) – Bradford businessman (uncredited)
- The African Queen (1951) – First Officer of Fort Shona
- Old Mother Riley's Jungle Treasure (1951) – Mr. Benson
- Salute the Toff (1952) – Night Porter (uncredited)
- Private Information (1952) – Minor Role (uncredited)
- Emergency Call (1952) – Police Sergeant
- Time Gentlemen, Please! (1952) – Jeremiah Higgins
- No Haunt for a Gentleman (1952) – Brother Ravioli
- Circumstantial Evidence (1952) – Charley Pott
- Lady in the Fog (1952) – Smithers
- Cosh Boy (1953) – Mr. Wimbush (uncredited)
- Street Corner (1953) – Mr. Propert (uncredited)
- The Red Beret (1953) – Minor Role (uncredited)
- Albert R.N. (1953) – Obergefreiter
- Stryker of the Yard (1953)
- Devil on Horseback (1954) – Mr. Parfitt
- Conflict of Wings (1954) – Sergeant, Working Party
- Betrayed (1954) – Fat Major (uncredited)
- The Black Rider (1954) – Holiday-maker
- Delavine Affair (1955) – Meyerling
- The Colditz Story (1955) – Lutyens
- The Love Match (1955) – Mr. Hall
- Windfall (1955) – (uncredited)
- Passport to Treason (1955) – Cafe Proprietor
- The March Hare (1956) – Nils Svenson
- Bond of Fear (1956) – Travelling Salesman
- Assignment Redhead (1956) – Mons. Paul Bonnet
- Ill Met by Moonlight (1957) – German Officer with Gen. Brauer (uncredited)
- You Pay Your Money (1957) – Hall Porter
- Murder Reported (1957) – Hatter
- Kill Me Tomorrow (1957) – Harrison
- The Big Chance (1957) – Passport Official
- Death Over My Shoulder (1958) – Nick Dayton
- The Two-Headed Spy (1958) – Gen. Toppe
- Operation Amsterdam (1959) – Peter
- Life in Danger (1959) – Dr. Nichols
- The Desperate Man (1959) – Hoad
- Circus of Horrors (1960) – German Police Inspector Knopf
- The Trunk (1961) – Nicholas Steiner
- Double Bunk (1961) – Freighter Pilot
- The Devil's Daffodil (1961) – Polizist (uncredited)
- Invasion Quartet (1961) – Gun Commander
- Fate Takes a Hand (1961) – Preeny
- Mystery Submarine (1963) – Lt. Lyncker
- The Gentle Terror (1963) – 1st Auditor
- Secrets of a Windmill Girl (1966) – Len Mason
- The Devil Rides Out (1968) – Satanist (uncredited)
- The Looking Glass War (1970) – Finnish Policeman (final film role)
