= David Tomblin =

English film and television director (1930–2005)

- David Tomblin
- Born: 18 October 1930; Borehamwood, Hertfordshire, England
- Died: 20 July 2005 (aged 74)
- Occupations: Producer, assistant director, director, screenwriter
- Years active: 1944–1998

David Tomblin, OBE (18 October 1930 – 20 July 2005) was an English film and television producer, assistant director, and director.

As a producer, he was best known for The Prisoner TV series. As a first assistant director, he worked on a number of high-profile films, including the Star Wars and Indiana Jones series and the 1978 Superman, and with commercially and critically successful directors including Richard Attenborough, George Lucas, Steven Spielberg and Sydney Pollack. As a director, he was best known for work on several Gerry Anderson's productions.

== Early life and career ==
Tomblin was born in Borehamwood, Hertfordshire, England. He began working in film as a runner at the age of 14. He worked on numerous productions, and (with an interruption for National Service in the Royal Marines), became a First Assistant Director in 1954. As well as films, he worked on a number of British-made TV series, including William Tell, One Step Beyond, The Count of Monte Cristo, The Adventures of the Scarlet Pimpernel, Douglas Fairbanks, Jr., Presents and The Invisible Man.

== McGoohan and Anderson ==
After working with Patrick McGoohan on Danger Man, McGoohan and Tomblin decided to set up a company to make their own series, The Prisoner, with story editor George Markstein. Tomblin was producer of the series, and wrote and directed several episodes.

Tomblin worked as a director on Gerry Anderson's live-action productions UFO, The Protectors and Space: 1999.

== Lucasfilm, Superman and Gandhi ==
Having worked on The Return of a Man Called Horse, directed by Irvin Kershner, when the production unit filmed for a few days in England, Tomblin was invited by Kershner to be first assistant director on The Empire Strikes Back. He subsequently worked as first assistant director for Lucasfilm on Return of the Jedi and the first three Indiana Jones films Raiders of the Lost Ark, Indiana Jones and the Temple of Doom and Indiana Jones and the Last Crusade. During production of Return of the Jedi, Tomblin directed Return of the Ewok, a short, never-finished film about Warwick Davis who played the Ewok Wicket W. Warrick. Tomblin later worked with Kershner again when Kershner directed 1983's Never Say Never Again, and with Spielberg on Empire of the Sun.

Tomblin often maintained multi-film working relationships with directors. He worked with Richard Donner on The Omen, Superman and those parts of Superman II directed by Donner. With Richard Attenborough, Tomblin worked on Attenborough's major multinational productions A Bridge Too Far, Gandhi, Cry Freedom and Chaplin. For Gandhi, Tomblin supervised the reconstruction of Gandhi's funeral in Delhi, to which the general public were invited, involving the direction of 250,000 extras. With Sydney Pollack, Tomblin worked on Out of Africa and Havana.

== Awards ==
Tomblin was awarded OBE in the 1994 Birthday Honours.

He was presented with BAFTA's Michael Balcon Award (now known as The Outstanding British Contribution to Cinema Award) in 2003. With Richard Attenborough, he was named as a winner of the 1982 DGA Award for Outstanding Directorial Achievement in Feature Film for Gandhi.

== Personal life ==
Tomblin had four children, including Lisa Tomblin, a film make-up department chief hairdresser, and Jane Tomblin, a production designer.

== Filmography ==
IMDb lists around 200 unique credits for Tomblin, but in 1982 he himself estimated he had already worked on around 500 films. Tomblin told an interviewer for a programme broadcast in 1984: "I only know that because I've just worked on a George Lucas film called Return Of The Jedi, and to get permission to work in the States I had to write down every film I'd been on. I got to 478 and then decided that was probably enough to convince them that I had a reasonable amount of experience."

=== Director ===
1. Return of the Ewok (1982) (V)
2. Space: 1999 (4 episodes, 1975-1976)
3. The Protectors (1 episode, 1974)
4. UFO (2 episodes, 1970-1971)
5. Baleia! Baleia! (1971)
6. The Prisoner (2 episodes, 1967-1968)

=== Producer ===
1. The Adventures of Baron Munchausen (1988) (line producer - though Tomblin's screen credit was 'Man of the match')
2. Return of the Ewok (1982) (V) (producer)
3. The Prisoner (producer)

=== Assistant director ===
1. Ever After (1998) (second unit director)
2. The Man in the Iron Mask (1998/I) (first assistant director)
3. Hearst Castle: Building the Dream (1996) (first assistant director)
4. Braveheart (1995) (first assistant director)
5. The Three Musketeers (1993) (first assistant director)
6. Chaplin (1992) (first assistant director)
7. Havana (1990/I) (first assistant director)
8. Indiana Jones and the Last Crusade (1989) (first assistant director: UK)
9. Empire of the Sun (1987) (assistant director)
10. Cry Freedom (1987) (first assistant director)
11. Out of Africa (1985) (first assistant director)
12. King David (1985) (assistant director) (second unit director)
13. Indiana Jones and the Temple of Doom (1984) (assistant director: UK)
14. Never Say Never Again (1983) (first assistant director)
15. Return of the Jedi (1983) (first assistant director) (second unit director)
16. Gandhi (1982) (first assistant director)
17. Ivanhoe (1982) (TV) (assistant director)
18. Raiders of the Lost Ark (1981) (first assistant director)
19. Superman II (1980) (second unit director)
20. The Empire Strikes Back (1980) (first assistant director)
21. The Prisoner of Zenda (1979) (second unit director)
22. Zulu Dawn (1979) (second unit director)
23. Superman (1978) (assistant director) (second unit director)
24. A Bridge Too Far (1977) (first assistant director)
25. The Omen (1976) (assistant director)
26. Barry Lyndon (1975) (assistant director)
27. The Adventure of Sherlock Holmes' Smarter Brother (1975) (assistant director)
28. Shaft in Africa (1973) (second unit director)
29. A Warm December (1973) (first assistant director)
30. Danger Man (assistant director) (10 episodes, 1964-1965) (second unit director) (6 episodes, 1966)
31. The Liquidator (1965) (assistant director)
32. The Alphabet Murders (1965) (assistant director)
33. Murder Ahoy (1964) (assistant director)
34. Murder Most Foul (1964) (assistant director)
35. Night Must Fall (1964) (assistant director)
36. The Haunting (1963/I) (assistant director)
37. I Thank a Fool (1962) (assistant director) (as Dave Tomblin)
38. Reach for Glory (1962) (assistant director)
39. We Joined the Navy (1962) (assistant director)
40. Alcoa Presents: One Step Beyond (assistant director) (13 episodes, 1961)
41. Danger Man (assistant director) (39 episodes, 1960-1961)
42. Taste of Fear (1961) (assistant director)
43. Invisible Man (assistant director) (21 episodes, 1959)
44. William Tell (assistant director) (21 episodes, 1958-1959)
45. The New Adventures of Charlie Chan (assistant director) (4 episodes, 1957-1958)
46. Hawkeye and the Last of the Mohicans (assistant director) (8 episodes, 1957)
47. The Count of Monte Cristo (assistant director) (1 episode, 1956)
48. The Elusive Pimpernel (1950) (third assistant director) (uncredited)
49. My Brother Jonathan (1948) (third assistant director) (uncredited)
