= Angelo Muscat =

Maltese actor (1930–1977)

- Muscat in The Prisoner, 1967
- Born: Angelo Muscat; 24 September 1930; Malta
- Died: 10 October 1977 (aged 47); London, England
- Occupation: Actor
- Years active: 1965–1971
- Height: 130 cm (4 ft 3 in)

Angelo Muscat (24 September 1930 – 10 October 1977) was a Maltese-born British character actor. He is primarily remembered for his role as the silent butler in the 1967 television series The Prisoner.

== Life and career ==
Muscat was born on 24 September 1930 in Malta to a policeman father. He was distinctly diminutive at only 4 ft 3 in (1.30 m), although both his parents and his three brothers were over 6 ft (1.8 m) in height. Muscat initially found work as a kitchen porter and then as a stoker at an RAF base in Malta. After the death of his parents and finding himself largely alone, he moved to England where he worked in a zip-fastener factory.

In 1961 Muscat joined a production of Snow White and the Seven Dwarfs that was to tour the United Kingdom. Moving into television, he played a Chumbley robot in the Doctor Who serial Galaxy 4 (1965), played the part of a clown in the ITV series Emergency – Ward 10 and appeared as the Queen's Servant in the BBC television adaptation of Alice in Wonderland (1966).

Muscat appeared in the television series The Prisoner (1967–1968) with Patrick McGoohan, appearing in 14 of the 17 episodes as a silent butler. He played an Oompa-Loompa in Willy Wonka & the Chocolate Factory (uncredited, 1971). He also appeared in the Beatles' Magical Mystery Tour (uncredited, 1967).

During his later years, Muscat lived alone and virtually penniless in a basement flat in North London. He found it difficult to find acting work, and to supplement his income he made ornate birdcages by hand.

== Death ==
Muscat died of pneumonia on 10 October 1977, aged 47 at St Bartholomew's Hospital in London.

== Legacy ==
Each year, on 10 October a small group of enthusiasts dubbed the "Friends of Angelo Muscat" (FOAM) celebrate his life.

== TV and filmography ==
Year	Title	Role	Notes
1965	Doctor Who	Chumbley Operator / Chumblie	Story: "Galaxy 4"
1966	Alice in Wonderland	Queen's Servant	uncredited
1966	G.G. Passion		uncredited
1967	The Prisoner	The Butler	
1967	Magical Mystery Tour	Catching Dwarf	uncredited
1971	Willy Wonka & the Chocolate Factory	Oompa Loompa	uncredited, final film role
