= The Prisoner in popular culture =

The Prisoner is a 17-episode British television series broadcast in the UK from 29 September 1967 to 1 February 1968. Starring and co-created by Patrick McGoohan, it combined spy fiction with elements of science fiction, allegory, and psychological drama.

Since its debut, the series' enduring popularity has led to its influencing and being referenced in a range of other media, such as the film The Truman Show, and the television shows Lost and The X-Files. The producer of The X-Files called The Prisoner "the Gone with the Wind of its genre." The Guardian wrote that "Without The Prisoner, we'd never have had cryptic, mindbending TV series like Twin Peaks or Lost. It's the Citizen Kane of British TV – a programme that changed the landscape."

For references to The Prisoner in other media see The Prisoner in other media.

== Comics ==
- Jack Kirby fashioned a Prisoner homage in Fantastic Four #s 84, March 1969–87, June 1969, involving Doctor Doom's kingdom of Latveria.
- Grant Morrison's graphic novel The Invisibles, about a group of revolutionaries rebelling against a secret world-controlling authority, contains several references to The Prisoner. In the collection Entropy in the UK, Invisibles leader King Mob is captured by government agent Sir Miles Delacourt; they exchange the show's famous opening lines: "What do you want?" "Information." "You won't get it." "By hook or by crook, we will." A major character in the series referred to as "Mr. 6".
- In the graphic novel The League of Extraordinary Gentlemen: Black Dossier by Alan Moore, the Village is referenced as an installation of the Thought Police during the Big Brother regime, the government having put out a contract for "dream inducers and killer balloons for some Welsh set-up", alluding to the series’s real-life location.
- In Alan Moore's V for Vendetta, V confronts Lewis Prothero with a recreation of the Larkhill Death Camp that he once ran, which resembles the minimal set against black drapes used by Number Two to recreate Number Six's childhood in "Once Upon a Time".
- The Prisoner is parodied in the story 'Zero Zone' in issues 106–107 of Sonic the Comic, where Sonic is taken to a zone resembling the Village and brainwashed into believing he is 'Citizen Seven'. The zone features a pink bouncing ball that immobilises and incapacitates Sonic when he tries to escape. It is revealed at the end of the story that the zone's ruler, 'Citizen One', was actually a computer program designed by Dr. Robotnik who broke free of its programming and created the fake reality due to loneliness.
- In Barry Windsor-Smith's "Weapon X", Wolverine is presented as a secret agent (driving a Lotus Seven) who resigns and is subsequently knocked out by agents and taken to an undisclosed location.
- In the DC Comics 1985 limited series comic book Crisis on Infinite Earths, Batman threatens the Joker with a reference to the show: "The only movie you'll be starring in is a remake of The Prisoner – and I don't mean the one in that village!"

== Books ==
- In Charles Stross' science fiction novel Glasshouse, one short scene takes place at a venue called the Village Cafe where an automated public address system, which cannot be turned off, makes regular loud announcements. The one reported in the text begins "Good afternoon! It's another beautiful day ..." and then goes on to inform listeners of the day's ice cream flavours and ends with a weather forecast, echoing a sequence from the TV series' opening episode.
- Xavier Mauméjean's short story "Be Seeing You!", from the second volume of the Tales of the Shadowmen anthology series, describes the origin of the Village in 1912, including the original Number 1 (Winston Churchill), Number 2 (Denis Nayland Smith), Number 6 (Sherlock Holmes), and Rover.
- In Stephen King's novella Hearts in Atlantis, The Prisoner is referenced many times by characters. King notes in the afterword that the usage is intentionally anachronistic because the story was set in 1966, before the series aired.
- There are references to The Prisoner in several spin-off novels of the BBC TV series Doctor Who. In The Man in the Velvet Mask by Daniel O'Mahony, a parallel universe version of the Marquis de Sade (referred to as Monsieur le 6) repeats the "I am not a number" catchphrase, after earlier reversing it as "I am not a free man, I am le 6". In Ben Aaronovitch's The Also People, a character scrawls the graffito "I AM NOT A NUMBER, I AM A FREEWHEELING UNICYCLE!" In Dead Romance by Lawrence Miles, the Time Lord colony Simia KK98 is similar to The Village.
- In Vivian Shaw’s urban fantasy novel Dreadful Company, a scene from The Prisoner is directly quoted.

== Computer games ==
- In the point-and-click adventure computer game Simon the Sorcerer II, when Simon is registering to enter the contest for Court Wizard, Simon quotes the "I am not a number" line. When he is told that he is number nine, his response is "I am not a number, I am a free man!", prompting the official who is helping him to remark "I hate people who can shamelessly quote in public".
- MMORPG RuneScape includes a 'random event' where the player is taken to an island, where several Prisoner references are made, including "I am not a number, I am a free man!"
- In the first-person shooter computer game The Operative: No One Lives Forever, it is possible to overhear two guards discussing their favourite spy TV shows and movies, including The Prisoner. Other works mentioned include Mission: Impossible, The Man from U.N.C.L.E., and the Matt Helm films The Silencers and The Ambushers.
- In the very early 1980s, Edu-Ware published two adventure games based on The Prisoner in which the player was 6, and had to find a way to escape.
- In the console game Aliens vs Predator (2010), the protagonist on the Alien single player campaign is called "Number Six"
- In Chapter 3 of the point-and-click adventure game The Dream Machine (video game) (2012), the main character is given a badge with a pennyfarthing and the number 6, and is referred to by his number to distinguish him from his other-numbered doppelgangers.

== Movies ==
"Although short-lived, it was credited with setting a thematic, at times surreal template for such films as The Truman Show (1998) with Jim Carrey and the current ABC series Lost."

- The 1994 film Killing Zoe includes a scene where the bankrobbers discuss the episode "A. B. and C." philosophically.
- The 1998 movie Double Team has a similar setting where counter terrorist agent Jack Quinn (Jean-Claude Van Damme) after being unconscious from an explosion wakes up in 'the Colony', an inescapable, invisible penal institution island for secret agents reminiscent of the Village.
- In High Fidelity (2000), the characters Rob Gordon (John Cusack) and Marie de Salle (Lisa Bonet) briefly mention both loving the show, and Barry (Jack Black) remembers that the lead was Patrick McGoohan.
- In Shrek (2001), the entrance of Shrek and Donkey at the seemingly deserted village of Duloc echoes Number 6's Arrival in the Village. The font on the village's signs in Shrek is the same as in The Prisoner's Village, and the architecture of the buildings is similar as well.
- In Alan Moore's 1986 graphic novel Watchmen, Rorschach says "Be seeing you" to several characters. This was carried over into the 2009 film adaptation.
- In David Lynch's Twin Peaks: Fire Walk With Me, Mrs Tremond's grandson covers his face with a mask and then removes it to reveal the face of a monkey in much the same way as Number Six removes Number One's masks in "Fall Out".
- In The Matrix, as Neo is running from Agent Smith in an apartment building, an elderly lady is seen in one of the rooms. While Smith launches a knife at Neo, it is shown that she was watching an episode from the series.

== Music ==
"The Prisoner's musical shadow stretches further into pop culture... Artists as different as Iron Maiden, Supergrass, Roy Harper, The Clash, Michael Penn, XTC, Dhani Harrison and more have riffed directly or indirectly off of The Prisoner."

- "The Prisoner" is an Iron Maiden song from their album The Number of the Beast. Inspired by the series, it features dialogue from the title sequence: the band's manager, Rod Smallwood, had to contact Patrick McGoohan to ask permission to use it for the song. According to witnesses, the usually calm Smallwood was completely star-struck during the conversation. McGoohan was reported to have said, "What did you say the name was? Iron Maiden? Do it." Iron Maiden later recorded the song "Back in the Village", on the album Powerslave, which contained lyrics referencing the series, such as "I'm back in the village", "I see sixes all the way", "Questions are a burden, and answers a prison for oneself" (quoting a sign seen in "Arrival)" or the final line, "I don't have a number, I'm a name", a tweaked version of the catchphrase "I am not a number, I am a free man". Furthermore, Iron Maiden singer Bruce Dickinson's second solo album 1994's Balls to Picasso features the dedications "Inspired by number 6" & "Be Seeing you" within the cover. Dickinson's song Broken from his The Best of Bruce Dickinson compilation features the "I will not be pushed, filed, stamped" quote within the lyrics, and Dickinson can also be seen discussing the influence the series had on him in VH1's Classic Albums documentary on The Number of the Beast.
- Dhani Harrison is the founder of a band called The New No. 2.
- Dr. Feelgood released the album Be Seeing You referencing the series. A compilation album issued in 2013 entitled "Taking No Prisoners" has a photo of the band members wearing Prisoner-style piped blazers on the front cover.
- Scottish pop band Altered Images made a music video to their 1982 single "See Those Eyes", which was filmed in Portmeirion, and featured the band's male members dressed in Village-style clothing. As the video progresses, each member is seen resigning from their previous jobs.
- The official promo for "Alright" by Supergrass is filmed in Portmeirion and features many iconic images from the series.
- The British pop group The Times had an early-1980s radio hit titled "I Helped Patrick McGoohan Escape".
- The cover of the live album Hullabaloo Soundtrack by Muse references The Prisoner.
- The series of chess moves called out during the first chess game in "Checkmate" appears in the Michael Nyman opera, The Man Who Mistook His Wife for a Hat during the game of mental chess.
- British pop-rock band XTC performed two music videos ("The Meeting Place" and "The Man Who Sailed Around His Soul") wearing costumes from the show.
- Colourbox, an English electronic musical group's song "Just Give 'Em Whiskey" samples The Prisoner dialogue.
- Slovenian Avant Garde group, Devil Doll, released the album, The Girl Who Was... Death in 1989. The title references the 15th episode of the series and contains lyrical references to the show as well as a cover of the show's theme song.
- Mick Jones titled an early b-side by The Clash after the series, though the lyrical connection is only a thematic one. Playing the song live, he used to make a guitar solo of an accelareted cover of the main title of the series.
- The cover of Michael Penn's 1997 album Resigned visually references the drawer in the opening sequence, and the film clip for the album's single "Try" ends on a shot of a door with the number "2" on it. His previous album was titled Free-for-All.
- Roy Harper twice references The Prisoner in his songs, most obviously in "McGoohan's Blues". The lyrics of his song "Woman" contain the line "I am not a number, I am a free... woman".
- The cover of the Manic Street Preachers 1998 album This Is My Truth Tell Me Yours was taken on Black Rock Sands near Porthmadog, a beach location in the series.
- In 2001 Future Legend Records (London, UK) released the album Another Number by Australian composer Carmel Morris. This album was composed entirely of new music inspired by the series and also pays homage to Ron Grainer and the other composers who provided incidental music in the original series. David Nettheim added guest voice over (he played the character of the Doctor in The Prisoner episode 'Schizoid Man'). Music videos shot at Portmeirion aired on UK television in 2002. The album was re-issued by IODA in 2010.
- British band Mansun referenced The Prisoner many times on their album Six. Not only was the album called Six, but certain song titles were named after episodes such as their song "Fall Out". Paul Draper openly admits to being a big fan of the show as a child.
- Samples of dialog are featured in Kaki King's song "The Betrayer" from her 2010 spy/espionage themed album Junior.
- Information, the first album by Toenut, features an altered photo of Number Six's face encased within Rover as its cover art; one of its tracks, "Information/32nd Theme Song," contains audio samples taken from the show's opening sequence.
- The Man in the Moon, a song by the band Imperial Drag, starts with a soundbite taken from the episode "Dance of the Dead".
- Howard Jones released a remix of his song "The Prisoner" titled "The Portmeirion Mix" (a reference to the show's filming location).
- Italian rapper Caparezza in the video for his song "Fuori Dal Tunnel" is seen running away from Rover in many scenes.
- The DJ & producer breakbeat duo, Dominic Butler and Mark Yardley, known as Stanton Warriors produced a song called "Prisoner" that includes familiar dialog from the series' title sequence sprinkled throughout.
- Mark Burgess of the English post-punk band The Chameleons is a big fan of the show and has referenced the series in his work. The cover to The Chameleons album 'The Radio 1 Evening Show Sessions' features the band in Portmeirion (the show's filming location). One of the band's songs, 'Free For All', is named after an episode of the series. Another song, 'Home Is Where The Heart Is', includes the line 'According to Hoyle, all cards on the table', a line of dialogue used in that same episode. Finally, during their 1987 tour of the UK and US, the band opened their concerts with the theme tune to the show.
- The afore-mentioned Mark Burgess also referenced the show in his subsequent bands. The band he formed after The Chameleons, 'The Sun and the Moon', used lines of dialogue in two of their songs; a cover version of Alice Cooper's Elected, from the 'Alive; Not Dead' EP, and 'Peace in Our Time' from their eponymous studio album. This latter track also contains themes influenced by the episode "Free For All". Additionally, the previously mentioned LP ends with the line 'Be Seeing You!’, a greeting used by Villagers throughout the show. Lastly, Burgess' other band, 'The Sons of God', included the line 'Yes, I'm a fool, not a rat' in their song 'Up on the Hill'. This is a line uttered by Number Six in the episode "Once Upon a Time".
- Near the end of the Blind Faith song “Do What You Like”, the line “Have you got Information” can be heard a couple of times. This is a variation of the phrase “We want Information” used in The Prisoner’s opening scenes and elsewhere.
- British comedian Harry Hill references the show in the song “Ken!” on his album Funny Times. At the end of the song the titular Ken, Ken Barlow from the British soap opera Coronation Street, exclaims that he “will not be pushed, filed, stamped, indexed, briefed, debriefed, or numbered” just as Number Six does when he first arrives in The Village.
- The fourth track on instrumental avant-garde metal band Behold the Arctopus' 2007 debut studio album Skullgrid is titled "You Are Number Six" as a reference to the series. As a compositional method, Warr guitarist and primary composer of the band Colin Marston wrote the song using only second and sixth intervals in honor of characters Number Two and Number Six, although Marston included the use of seventh and third intervals as inversions of the second and sixth intervals as well as some fifth intervals in the form of power chords with the second and sixth intervals as roots. According to Marston, "[i]f you were gonna do some kind of dumb, cheesy music theory analysis you could find that that is sort of true in one way or another for the whole song."
- The song "Number 6: Outsiders Are Sacrificed for Group Solidarity" from UK rapper Roseland En Why Cee is told from the perspective of Patrick McGoohan’s character. It samples dialogue and includes many lyrics referencing the series. Such as “They call me 6, but I’m one of one”, “went to sleep on common ground and woke up in some village” & “By hook or crook or rook or knight i’ll find the king and slay him”.

== Radio ==
- The show was parodied in the episode "I Am Not A Number!" of the 1996 BBC Radio 4 comedy series Fab TV,
- In the radio version of impressionist show Dead Ringers, a version of The Prisoner is set within the radio soap opera The Archers. In it, Ambridge is the Village, Joe Grundy is Number 2, and Ruth Archer is Number 1.

== Television ==
"Continuing interest in The Prisoner can be seen in television shows created long after 1967"

- A 1969 episode of The Avengers, "Wish You Were Here", is influenced by The Prisoner, as Tara goes to visit her uncle and finds him held in a hotel with every attempt at escape thwarted by 'accidents'.
- Mark Frost, co-creator of Twin Peaks, has stated that The Prisoner was a large influence on him and the show.
- In the "Krusty Gets Busted" episode of The Simpsons, the "Krusty Gets Busted" animation played on the TV news at the start of Act II recalls The Prisoner's tag (as well as the Looney Tunes/Merrie Melodies opening titles). In another episode, "The Joy of Sect", Marge flees the "Movementarians" by avoiding various traps. One of these traps is Rover (and a version of The Prisoner theme plays while she runs). In "The Computer Wore Menace Shoes", Homer is kidnapped after accidentally finding out about a vast conspiracy and placed on "The Island"; Patrick McGoohan provides the voice of a caricature of himself as Number Six, and the reason given as to why he is on "The Island" is because he invented the bottomless peanut bag. He asks Homer what number he is, to which Homer replies "I am not a number, I am a man and don't you ever... Oh wait, I'm number 5". Number Six reveals to Homer that he has made an escape raft to flee the Village in, and explicitly states it is big enough to carry them both, but Homer needlessly throws him over the side to steal the raft entirely for himself – to which the annoyed Number Six remarks, "that's the third time that's happened!" During his escape, Homer is chased by Rover, which he easily pops (with a spork).
- ReBoot episode "Number 7" makes a number of references to The Prisoner series, including visual references such as Number 2's oval chair, quotes such as McGoohan's line "I will not be pushed, filed, stamped, indexed, briefed, debriefed or numbered!" and a scene that recreates part of the final episode, "Fall Out".
- The British sitcom 2point4 children features a lengthy tribute to The Prisoner in the episode "Seven Dials", where one of the central characters is imprisoned in Portmeirion by an opponent.
- During the 3-part episode "Brainwashed" in the animated series Pinky and the Brain, there is a segment based on The Prisoner, in which the main characters are sent to a village where the residents are only identified by the hats they wear, in addition to other homages to the original series.
- In the reimagined Battlestar Galactica series (2003–2009), the character of Number Six—a beautiful Cylon infiltrator played by model Tricia Helfer—is named as an homage to The Prisoner, according to writer/ producer Ronald D. Moore.
- The Nowhere Man TV series was heavily influenced by The Prisoner. Its creator, Lawrence Hertzog, speaks at length in the DVD commentaries about how The Prisoner was his favourite show. The protagonist of the series, photojournalist Thomas Veil, is relentlessly pursued for a set of negatives, as The Prisoner's Number Six is similarly pressed to find out the cause of his resignation. Veil finds himself transported to a strange village in episode 105, "Paradise on Your Doorstep", where he is forcibly detained. In episode 119, "Doppelganger", Veil tracks information to a town where a doppelganger Thomas Veil exists, who also works as a photojournalist; this references The Prisoner episode "The Schizoid Man", where there are two identical Number 6 characters.
- In the episode "Night Lines" of the BBC comedy series Coupling, the opening sequence of The Prisoner is parodied in a dream sequence of Ben Miles' character, Patrick.
- In 1987, Channel 4 produced The Laughing Prisoner, a comedic homage in which Jools Holland appeared as The Prisoner No. 7. Holland had recently resigned from the Channel 4 music show The Tube. The programme was filmed at Portmeirion and also featured Stephen Fry as Number Two, Hugh Laurie and Stanley Unwin. Several bands, including Siouxsie and the Banshees, performed in the "Village" bandstand.
- A 2001 episode of the Sci-Fi Channel's The Invisible Man, "A Sense of Community", is a homage to The Prisoner that sees the characters in The Community, a resort for spies they are told they can never leave, under constant surveillance and with their apartments duplicated.
- The credits of the first three series of the Bob Mills vehicle In Bed with Medinner were an homage to the opening credits of The Prisoner, while the set was designed to look like Number Six's flat.
- Fox's VR.5 has been called "The Prisoner of the 1990s", which also featured mind games and reluctant spies. A direct homage occurs when a character is handed the message "Just call this number and ask for the Prisoner, no names".
- J. J. Abrams has said that "I loved The Prisoner, which was a very odd sort of hybrid of sci-fi, mystery and character, and certainly there are elements of The Prisoner in both Alias and Lost. ". The iconic bicycle of The Prisoner logo is featured in an episode of the Abrams-produced Fringe where a special agent's memories are reprogrammed. In a later Fringe episode, "Letters of Transit", the character of Walter Bishop calls out "I am not a number, I am a free man" while in a delusional state.
- In a 2-part episode of G.I. Joe titled "There's No Place Like Springfield", Shipwreck wakes up in a small, unassuming town on an island that turns out to be a front for Cobra. Much like Number Six, he is subjected to various brainwashing techniques in order to recover a secret formula implanted within his subconscious. There are additional homages such as Shipwreck's address being revealed as "No. 6 Village Drive". Also, there is a scene where Shipwreck is captured within a giant ball that strongly resembles one of the Rovers.
- In SpongeBob SquarePants, episode 130, Mr. Krabs says "Questions are a danger to you and a burden to others." This is a reference to the phrase "Questions are a burden to others; answers a prison for oneself" seen on a sign in the Labour Exchange in "Arrival".
- In the Hercules: The Legendary Journeys episode, "Stranger in a Strange World", Iolaus is locked in a prison cell and is told he will only be released when his numeral is called. In reference to The Prisoner, Iolaus then exclaims, "I am not a numeral! I am a free man!"
- In the Columbo episode "Identity Crisis" (1975), Patrick McGoohan plays a C.I.A. operator who uses the "be seeing you" phrase a number of times. Early in the episode, he wears a dark jacket with white piping, similar to the jacket he wore as Number Six. (McGoohan also directed the episode.)
- In the final episode of The Bionic Woman, On The Run, the title character resigns from her job and tries to escape from her former employers. However, the people in charge decide that she cannot just be allowed to leave and want to put her into a safe community where they can keep their eye on her. The final episode was acknowledged to have been inspired by The Prisoner as Jaime is similarly being pursued by entities concerned about the secret information she possesses.
- In Megas XLR, the episode "A Clockwork Megas" is a reference to The Prisoner.
- Santa vs. the Snowman 3D is an animated one-off that aired on 13 December 1997. There is a scene in the Control Room that uses two observers on a rotating see-saw, observing a 360-degree monitor wall similar to the one used in The Prisoner.
- In the Person of Interest episode, "Booked Solid", James Caviezel (who reprised the role of Number Six) uses the "that would be telling" phrase. Also, a season 1 Person of Interest episode title is "Many Happy Returns" (also an original The Prisoner series episode title) and mention of the "Prisoner" in the season 2 episode "Prisoner's Dilemma". And most recently, a voice-over in the episode "Deus Ex Machina" echoes Number Six's speech with: "When the whole world is watched, filed, indexed, numbered, the only way to disappear is to appear, hiding our true identities inside a seemingly ordinary life. You're not a free man anymore, Harold. You're just a number."
- In the Mad Men season 6 episode "The Crash", the Draper children watch The Prisoner episode "Free For All".
- 'Sledge Hammer!' season 1 episode "All Shook Up" features Hammer going undercover in an Elvis Presley impersonator contest as contestant number 6. Alan Spenser's DVD commentary of the episode reveals this was a tribute to The Prisoner.
- 'Bester' and 'Garibaldi's Aide' in 'Babylon 5' use the mocking thumb-and-forefinger salute and the associated phrase "Be seeing you" to imply inside knowledge of a secret plan involving his interlocutor.
- In the season 2 finale of Kaguya-sama: Love Is War, Ishigami is chased and encased by a balloon in a homage to Rover.
