= The Prisoner in other media =

The Prisoner, a British television series that originally ran from 1967 to 1968, has been represented in several other media.

For popular culture references, see The Prisoner in popular culture.

== Novels ==
=== Ace ===
Ace Books in the United States published three original novels based upon the television series. The novels are all set after the events of the TV series finale, "Fall Out".

- The Prisoner by Thomas M. Disch (later republished as I Am Not a Number!), issued in 1969, details the recapture of the Prisoner after he had been brainwashed to forget his original experience in the Village, and his struggles to remember what was taken from him and to escape. A 2000s reprint of the book by iBooks includes the banner phrase "The Original Novel", erroneously suggesting the series was based upon the book.
- The Prisoner: Number Two by David McDaniel (also published as Who Is Number Two?) and The Prisoner: A Day in the Life by Hank Stine, published 1969–70, are notable for stating explicitly that Number Six is John Drake from Danger Man.

All three novels have been reprinted by Ace and other publishers numerous times over the years (Dennis Dobson, London 1979; New English Library, 1979 and others). Most recently the Disch and Stine books were republished in 2002.

In 2002, all three books were reissued in the collection The Prisoner Omnibus by Carlton Books (ISBN 1-8422253-1-6).

=== Roger Langley ===
In the 1980s, Roger Langley of the Prisoner Appreciation Society wrote three novellas based upon the series:

- Charmed Life
- Think Tank
- When in Rome

These books were made available through the fan club, and at the Prisoner Shop in Portmeirion and are long out of print individually. They were reissued and revised in one volume as the Prisoner Trilogy, available from the Prisoner Shop in Portmeirion as well as from online sources.

=== Powys Media ===
Independent UK publisher Powys Media obtained the rights to The Prisoner (and Space: 1999) in the early 2000s. Its books were primarily available by mail-order only.

- The Prisoner's Dilemma by Jonathan Blum and Rupert Booth; introduction by J. Michael Straczynski (March 2005; ISBN 0-9677280-5-3)
- Miss Freedom by Andrew Cartmel (February 2008; ISBN 0-9677280-8-8)

Additional titles were announced by Powys, but as of 2015 have yet to be published.

== Non-fiction ==
- Peel, John (1988). Number Six: The Prisoner Book (A Files Magazine Special). Los Angeles, Calif.: Schuster & Schuster. ISBN 1-55698-158-9.
- White, Matthew; Ali, Jaffer (1988). The Official Prisoner Companion. New York, N.Y.: Warner Books Inc. ISBN 978-0-446-38744-6.
- Rogers, Dave (1992). The Prisoner & Danger Man. London: Boxtree. ISBN 978-1-85283-260-5.
- Fairclough, Robert (2002). The Prisoner: The Official Companion to the Classic TV Series. iBooks. ISBN 978-1842224342.
- Fairclough, Robert (2005). The Prisoner: The Original Scripts Vol. 1. Richmond, Surrey: Reynolds and Hearn. ISBN 1-903111-76-5.
- Fairclough, Robert (2006). The Prisoner: The Original Scripts Vol. 2. Richmond, Surrey: Reynolds and Hearn. ISBN 1-903111-81-1.
- Davies, Steven Paul; Cox, Alex (2007). The Prisoner Handbook. Pan Macmillan. ISBN 978-0-230-53028-7.
- Davy, Rick (2017). The Prisoner - The Essential Guide. Quoit Media Limited. ISBN 978-1-911-53705-2.

The two script collections edited by Robert Fairclough include several scripts written for the series, but not filmed.

== Comic books ==
=== DC Comics ===
Shattered Visage is a four-issue comic book limited series published by DC Comics in 1988–1989 based on The Prisoner. Illustrated by Mister X creator Dean Motter and co-written with Mark Askwith, this sequel series was later collected as a 208-page trade paperback, with the addition of a new prologue. The trade paperback remains in print.

=== Marvel Comics ===
The premise of the television series fascinated comic book artist Jack Kirby, who created a four-issue homage in 1969 in Fantastic Four #84–87, in which the superhero team finds itself in Doctor Doom's Latveria, a city like the Village in many respects. In the "Bullpen Bulletins" page in Marvel Comics cover-dated July 1976, Marvel announced a comic book based on The Prisoner, to be written by Steve Englehart and drawn by a then-unchosen artist and scheduled to be "starting this summer". The artist assigned to the project would be Gil Kane. When Jack Kirby returned to Marvel in the mid-'70s after a run at DC Comics, the property was transferred to him. A test issue was put together but never completed (all 17 pages were scripted and pencilled by Kirby, but only parts were lettered and inked, by Mike Royer). Original artwork from this comic still exists and occasionally turns up for auction. Some of it has been published in the comic book fanzine The Jack Kirby Collector. The surviving artwork suggests that the first issue, at least, would have been an adaptation of "Arrival."

=== Titan Comics ===
In 2018 Titan Comics officially published, for the first time, the unpublished comic pages of The Prisoner drawn by Gil Kane and Jack Kirby in a special hardback Original Art Edition. The book, which presented the pages as actual size, also included an article written by Steve Englehart, who wrote the Gil Kane comic, a foreword written by Mike Royer, and scans of the original ITC Press Pack. Mike Allred provided a fully coloured version of a Jack Kirby spread. Rick Parker also provided a letterered version of the Gil Kane comics based on Englehart's original script.

2018 also saw the launch of an all-new four-book mini-series Prisoner comic book also from Titan Comics. Called The Uncertainty Machine, the comic written by Peter Milligan from an original plot by David Leach (who was also the editor) was drawn by Colin Lorimer and coloured by Joana Lafuente. The new comic set within the world of The Prisoner introduced a Number Six in the guise of British secret agent Breen, who is given a mission to infiltrate The Village in order to rescue a fellow spy who had been taken prisoner by the mysterious and ultra-secret establishment. The comic was critically well received. The original Number Six does not appear in the story, though Patrick McGoohan's image was featured on variant covers throughout the run.

== Computer games ==
In the early 1980s, Edu-Ware produced two computer games based upon the series for the Apple II computer. The first, titled simply, The Prisoner, was released in 1980, followed by a remake, Prisoner 2 in 1982.

The 2009 Flash game Cyclomaniacs features a character named “Letter F,” a reference to the title character.

== Role-playing games ==
Steve Jackson Games' popular role-playing game system GURPS released a (now out of print) world book for The Prisoner. It included maps, episode synopses, details of the Village and its inhabitants, and much other material. For instance, it has suggestions for game scenarios with the premise reinterpreted for outer space, heroic fantasy, horror, and even complete inversion into something akin to Hogan's Heroes.

== Documentaries ==
Six into One: The Prisoner File (1984, 45 minutes) docudrama presented by Channel 4 after a repeat of the series in the UK. With its central premise to establish a reason Number 6 resigned, the presentation revolved around a new Number 2 communicating with staff (and Number 1). It reviewed scenes from Danger Man and The Prisoner, incorporated interviews with cast members (including McGoohan) and fans, and addressed the political environment giving rise to the series and McGoohan's heavy workload.

The Prisoner Video Companion (1990, 48 minutes) American production with clips, including a few from Danger Man, and voice-over narration discussing origins, interpretations, meaning, symbolism, etc., in a format modelled on the 1988 Warner book The Official Prisoner Companion by Matthew White and Jaffer Ali. It was released to DVD in the early 2000s as a bonus feature with A&E's release of The Prisoner series. MPI also issued The Best of The Prisoner, a video of series excerpts.

Don't Knock Yourself Out (2007, 95 minutes) documentary issued as part of Network's DVD set for the series' 40th anniversary. It features interviews with around 25 cast and crew members. The documentary received a separate DVD release, featuring an extended cut, in November 2007 accompanied by a featurette titled "Make Sure It Fits", regarding Eric Mival's music editing for the series.

In My Mind (2017, 78 mins) documentary film by Chris Rodley about his experiences interviewing Patrick McGoohan in 1983 for the Six into One: The Prisoner File documentary. Includes previously unseen interview material and insights from McGoohan's daughter, Catherine.

== Television ==
In 1987, Jools Holland (a noted fan of the show) fronted a spoof documentary made by Channel 4 in the UK, entitled The Laughing Prisoner No 7, which also starred Stephen Fry, Terence Alexander, Stanley Unwin and Hugh Laurie. The show mixed archive footage with musical numbers, and was mainly filmed in Portmeirion.

The sixth episode of The Simpsons' twelfth season, "The Computer Wore Menace Shoes", makes a reference to The Prisoner. The episode's third act, which serves as a parody of The Prisoner, features several references to the series. When the secret organization finds out about Homer's discovery, he is taken to a secret location called the "Island". The "Island" is modeled after the "Village", where Number Six is taken in The Prisoner. While he is in the "Island", Homer is repeatedly gassed by unexpected objects, a reference to the way Number Six would often be gassed in The Prisoner. While escaping the "Island", Homer is chased by a "big balloon". The balloon is a reference to Rover, a floating white ball in The Prisoner that was created to keep inhabitants in the "Village". Patrick McGoohan himself provided the voice of Number Six for this episode.

The Lupin the Third Part 2 episode "The Sound of the Devil's Bells Call Lupin" is based on The Prisoner. The plot revolves around Lupin trying to rescue Jigen and Goemon from the mysterious village of Gemarschaft, where they are being brainwashed by a bell as part of a secret government experiment. The antagonist of the episode, Sister Lavinia, uses giant pink bubbles to trap people.

The Pinky and the Brain three-parter, “Brainwashed”, pays homage to The Prisoner. For most of the first two-parts, Pinky and the Brain get trapped in a mysterious village known as “The Land of Hats” which takes cues from “The Village”.

British sitcom 2point4 Children also parodied the series in its "Seven Dials" episode. The episode sees the character Ben kidnapped and taken to Portmeirion, where he is menaced by Rover.

Sci-fi series Babylon 5 character Alfred Bester made uses of the catch phrase "Be seeing you" with accompanying salute in S1E6 "Mind-War" and S4E17 "The Face of the Enemy".

Numerous other series have featured episodes paying homage to The Prisoner, such as the 2000 version of The Invisible Man. Star Trek: The Next Generation featured a 1989 episode entitled, "The Schizoid Man", which was not only named after a Prisoner episode, but Patrick McGoohan was intended for a guest-starring role.

Dr. Walter Bishop uses the iconic phrase, "I am not a number, I am a free man!", in the season four episode, Letters of Transit.

== Film ==
A movie version of The Prisoner was in development hell for many years at Universal Pictures. At one point Simon West was attached as director, with Patrick McGoohan on board as an executive producer, script consultant, and possible cameo appearance. Christopher Nolan has also been reported to be considering a big-screen version. As of 2015 no remake has been announced since the 2009 AMC miniseries.

Action film John Wick antagonist Viggo Tarasov uses the catch phrase "Be seeing you" just before dying. John Wick: Chapter 2 antagonist Ares uses the catch phrase and salute just before dying as well.

== Advertising ==
A late 1980s British TV commercial for the Renault 21 took many of its cues from The Prisoner.

== Audio dramas ==
On 5 January 2015, Big Finish Productions, best known for its long-running series of BBC-licensed audio dramas based upon Doctor Who, announced that it will be producing licensed audio dramas based upon The Prisoner, with the first scheduled for release in 2016 and that Mark Elstob will portray Number Six in the new series. The first series, containing new reimaginings of three original series scripts ("Arrival", "The Schizoid Man" and "The Chimes of Big Ben") and one new story ("Your Beautiful Village") and written/directed by Nicholas Briggs, was released in January 2016 and was well received. The first series also featured John Standing, Celia Imrie, Ramon Tikaram and Michael Cochrane as "Number Two" and Helen Goldwyn as "The Village Voice/Operations Controller".

A second series was released in August 2017, comprising four stories; "I Met a Man Today" (adapted from "Many Happy Returns"), "Project Six" (adapted from "A, B and C"), an adaptation of "Hammer into Anvil", and new story "Living in Harmony" (not adapted from the TV episode of the same title).

A third series was released in November 2019, comprising four stories; an adaptation of "Free For All", and new stories "The Girl Who Was Death" (using story elements, but not directly adapted, from the TV episode of the same title), "The Seltzman Connection" (inspired by the episode "Do Not Forsake Me, Oh My Darling"), and "No One Will Know".

These audio dramas have been broadcast by BBC Radio 4 Extra as part of its The 7th Dimension programming.

== Festival ==
The main character of The Prisoner, Number Six, inspired the name of Festival N°6, which takes place since 2012 at the village of Portmeirion. This annual music and art festival celebrates Number Six's way of thinking: reflection and independence of mind.

== Music ==
Although the main title theme was composed by Ron Grainer, the incidental music used in the series came from a wide variety of sources, including library music and cues from established composers such as Wilfrid Josephs and Albert Elms.

=== Soundtracks ===
Silva Screen Records released two editions of soundtrack CDs, a three-volume set in the early 1990s, and another three-volume set in the early 2000s subtitled "Files" that included music not included in the previous issue along with dialogue excerpts.

A single-LP soundtrack release was issued by Six of One for its membership in the 1980s and is considered a collector's item; titled The Prisoner: Original Soundtrack Music from the TV Series Starring Patrick McGoohan, the album was later issued by Bamcaruso Records (WEBA 066) in a deluxe edition that included The Making of the Prisoner, a booklet on the series by Roger Langley, a map of the Village, and a poster featuring a hand-drawn image of Number Six being chased by Rover.

In December 2007, it was announced that Network DVD would be releasing a new 3-CD set of the soundtrack, compiled by series music editor Eric Mival, which would include a facsimile of his "music bible" used during the making of the series.

=== References in songs/albums ===
- "McGoohan's Blues" from Roy Harper's 1969 album Folkjokeopus. Harper had previously used an extract from the episode "Free For All" on the track "Circle" from his 1967 album Come Out Fighting Ghengis Smith.
- "The Prisoner" from Iron Maiden's The Number of the Beast (which features an original sample of the dialogue that runs over the opening titles, for which personal permission from Patrick McGoohan was obtained) and "Back In The Village" from Powerslave.
- "Escape From The Village", from Blitzkrieg's 2006 album Sins and Greed.
- "I Helped Patrick McGoohan Escape", from The Times's 1982 album of the same name. It was accompanied by a tongue-in-cheek video based on the series. The album also features their version of the Danger Man theme.
- "The Prisoner", by The Clash.
- "Another Number", by Carmel Morris, 2001 album re-issued via IODA 2010; complete original music homage, featuring guest voice of David Nettheim.
- Be Seeing You, a 1977 album by Dr Feelgood. It claimed to be "produced by Number 2 for Number 6", and sleeve photos featured band members wearing piped blazers and scarves.
- The Girl Who Was... Death, a 1989 album by Devil Doll.

=== Songs containing samples from The Prisoner ===
- "Information/32nd Theme Song", from the album Information by Toenut.
- "Just Give 'Em Whisky", from the self-titled album by Colourbox.
- "Speedlearn", by Higher Intelligence Agency.

=== References in album/single artwork ===
- "Resigned" (single), by Michael Penn.
- Six, by Mansun.

=== References in music videos ===
Music videos filmed in Portmeirion and featuring Prisoner costumes and props, such as piped blazers and penny farthing badges:

- "See Those Eyes" by Altered Images.
- "The Man Who Sailed Around His Soul" and "The Meeting Place" by XTC.
- "Alright" by Supergrass.
