= The Schizoid Man =

The Schizoid Man could refer to:

- Schizoid personality disorder
- "The Schizoid Man" (The Prisoner), 1967 episode of the British sci-fi TV series
- "The Schizoid Man" (Star Trek: The Next Generation), 1989 episode of the American sci-fi TV series
- Schizoid Man (comics), name for multiple characters appearing in Marvel Comics
- "21st Century Schizoid Man", 1969 song by the progressive rock band King Crimson
