= Panciera =

Panciera is a surname. Notable people with the name include:

- Antonio Panciera (1350–1431), Italian Cardinal and humanist
- Don Panciera (1927–2012), American football quarterback
- Larry Panciera (1921–1998), American college baseball coach
- Mario Panciera (Mr. Doctor), Italian musicians
- Renato Panciera (1935–2001), Italian sprinter
