= Court Martial (UFO) =

- UFO episode
- Episode no.: Episode 10
- Directed by: Ron Appleton
- Written by: Tony Barwick
- Cinematography by: Brendan J. Stafford
- Editing by: Len Walter
- Production code: 12
- Original air date: 16 November 1970

Cast
- Ed Bishop as Commander Straker; George Sewell as Colonel Freeman; Michael Billington as Colonel Foster; Grant Taylor as General Henderson; Vladek Sheybal as Dr Jackson; Keith Alexander as Lieutenant Ford; Gary Myers as Captain Waterman; Norma Ronald as Miss Ealand; Jack Hedley as Webb; Georgina Cookson as Jane Grant; Neil McCallum as Carl Mason; Tutte Lemkow as A.G. Singleton; Noel Davis as Diana's agent; Louise Pajo as Miss Scott; Pippa Steel as Diana

Episode chronology
← Previous "Close Up"	Next → "Confetti Check A-O.K."

"Court Martial" is the 10th episode of UFO, a British science fiction television series made by Century 21 Productions for ITC Entertainment. Written by Tony Barwick, it was the 12th episode to be filmed, shot in September 1969 at MGM-British Studios under director Ron Appleton. It first aired on 16 November 1970 on the CTV Television Network in Canada. In the UK, it was first broadcast by Tyne Tees Television on 1 May 1971.

Set in the 1980s, UFO depicts a secret organisation – Supreme Headquarters Alien Defence Organisation (SHADO) – attempting to thwart an alien invasion involving UFOs. In "Court Martial", SHADO Colonel Paul Foster is accused of espionage, tried by court-martial and sentenced to death, but Commander-in-Chief Ed Straker believes he has been wrongfully convicted. The episode has received a mixed response from commentators.

== Plot ==
At SHADO headquarters, General Henderson is presiding over a court-martial. The defendant, Colonel Foster, is found guilty and sentenced to death.

Days earlier, Foster, in his public role as a film producer, hosts an actress and her agent at his home. He agrees to find the actress a part in an upcoming production at SHADO's front organisation, Harlington-Straker Film Studios. Meanwhile, Commander Straker is driving home when he finds a covert listening device in his car. He suspects it was planted on the orders of Henderson, his superior at the International Astrophysical Commission.

Henderson tells Straker the bug was a test of his loyalty: someone in SHADO HQ has leaked classified information to the news media, forcing Henderson to take out a suppression order. The evidence points to Foster, whom Straker is informally questioning when word arrives of a second leak. This too is traced to Foster, who is arrested and charged with espionage.

A court-martial is convened. Dr Jackson, acting as prosecutor, calls witnesses who testify to the security of HQ's transmitters. The devices take input from Straker, Foster and Colonel Freeman only, and all information is encrypted. When called as a character witness, Straker stops short of professing complete faith in the accused. Foster maintains his innocence, but Jackson produces financial records showing that he recently received a large payment from an unidentifiable Swiss bank account. Denounced as a liar and a traitor who has sold out SHADO, Foster is convicted of espionage and sentenced to death. Straker and Freeman believe there has been a miscarriage of justice.

At the studios, Straker is accosted by film director Carl Mason, whose crew are using a new pulsed lighting system. Mason accuses Foster, who had been monitoring the production, of leaking the design to a rival company. Straker and Freeman suspect Foster has been bugged by an industrial spy who was unaware of his SHADO affiliation.

Straker and Freeman set out to clear Foster's name. Knowing he sometimes works away from HQ, they search his home and find hidden cameras and listening devices. A radio receiver is found outside. Straker and Freeman visit the electronics shop where the equipment was bought and coerce the owner, a man called Singleton, into handing over the customer's name and address. Meanwhile, Foster has been led out of his cell to sign an appeal. He dives into an emergency lift and escapes from HQ. Henderson orders guards to give chase and shoot to kill.

The industrial spy, Jane Grant, is apprehended and brought to Straker, who obtains her signed confession after threatening to fire a sonic weapon into her brain. Before Straker can pass the affidavit to Henderson, Foster is gunned down. However, he is not dead: at Jackson's suggestion, the guards' live rounds were replaced with anaesthetic darts. Exonerated, Foster confronts the talent agent he met earlier and returns his bribe, telling him, "You don't know how much that cheque nearly cost me."

== Production ==
Shooting began on 16 September 1969 and concluded around the end of September. The episode was filmed under the title "Shoot to Kill", which remained unchanged until the post-production stage. "Court Martial" was Vladek Sheybal's (Dr Doug Jackson) third appearance in UFO, following on from the Paul Foster-centric episodes "Exposed" and "Ordeal". Supporting character Lieutenant Johnson does not appear in the episode because her actress, Ayshea, was on her honeymoon.

As originally scripted, the episode began linearly, rather than in medias res with Henderson reading the verdict followed by a jump back in time. The first act also included a sequence in which SHADO Moonbase shoots down an incoming UFO. Foster meeting clients at his home was a late addition, inserted during a rewrite in early September. The scene in the electronics shop was initially longer, with Straker and Freeman throwing flammable solvent over Singleton and threatening to burn him unless he cooperates.

The sets for Straker's secretary's office, Henderson's secretary's office, and the trial room all featured the same typewriter prop. Henderson's secretary's office was a reuse of a set that appears as Freeman's bedroom earlier in the episode. A driving scene, in which a shocked Straker finds the listening device and almost collides with a hauler vehicle, was the episode's only model effects sequence. The miniature vans on the hauler were originally made for Joe 90.

== Reception ==
"Court Martial" has received a mixed critical response.

Noting that "every series involving a military organisation has at least one episode like 'Court Martial'", John Charles of Video Watchdog wrote that the ending does not fully convince, while the plot is "overly familiar". However, he added that the episode features "good use of various standing sets on the British MGM [sic] studio backlot [...] to provide an atypical backdrop for this scenario."

Review website The Anorak Zone rated "Court Martial" the 11th worst episode of UFO. Taking issue with the format, the website observed that the premise of a main character being sentenced to death is common in science fiction, and calls for considerable suspension of disbelief; in this episode's case, "it's just too much of a stretch to believe that Foster really will be executed." It also argued that the espionage storyline is unresolved: "It's still not clear what will happen to the spy [...] and how [SHADO will] stop her revealing what she knows."

Describing the episode as "an exercise in waiting until the 'twist' is revealed", John Kenneth Muir wrote that the "predictability" of courtroom episodes instantly limits their "drama and suspense". In this respect, he negatively grouped "Court Martial" with the Star Trek episode of the same name as well as "Murder on the Rising Star", a similarly plotted episode of Battlestar Galactica. Muir found Straker's testimony "intriguing" for his admission that Foster is not his friend "in the sense [Jackson says]"; according to Muir, this is "very non-traditional in terms of classic TV tropes, wherein all main characters are basically supposed to be best buddies."

Both Muir and The Anorak Zone expressed surprise at Jackson's antagonistic role, noting earlier episodes present him as a physician and psychiatrist. Muir called the character's unsympathetic portrayal "not at all consistent [...] with his previous appearances". Although it found Sheybal "engaging", the website argued that the changes to his character showed ITC's tendency to treat "inter-episode continuity as a mere formality".
