= A. B. and C. =

- The Prisoner episode
- Episode no.: Series 1 Episode 3
- Directed by: Pat Jackson
- Written by: Anthony Skene
- Production code: 11
- Original air date: 13 October 1967

Guest appearances
- Colin Gordon; Sheila Allen; Peter Bowles; Annette Carell; Katherine Kath

Episode chronology
← Previous "The Chimes of Big Ben"	Next → "Free for All"

"A. B. and C." is an episode of the allegorical British science fiction TV series The Prisoner. It was written by Anthony Skene and directed by Pat Jackson and eleventh produced. It was the third episode to be broadcast in the UK on ITV (ATV Midlands and Grampian) on Friday 13 October 1967 and first aired in the United States on CBS on Saturday 22 June 1968.

The episode stars Patrick McGoohan as Number Six and features as Number Two Colin Gordon – the only actor other than Leo McKern who would play Number Two in more than one episode.

== Plot summary ==
Number Two is directed by Number One to step up efforts to extract information from Number Six—specifically relating to what information he is believed to have sold, leading to his resignation from the intelligence agency he worked for. Two directs Number Fourteen to prepare a machine she has developed. With the help of an injected drug, it will allow observation of, and influence on, the dream-state of a person connected to it. They have prepared three dossiers of foreign agents that Six was known to have met during an elegant party hosted by Madame Engadine prior to his resignation, suspecting that he has sold out to one of them, the whole event plays out as an alternative life if the village hadn't gotten to him first. The dossiers are labelled "A", "B", and "C".

On the first two nights, Six is sedated through his evening tea, brought to Number Fourteen's laboratory, injected with the drug, and connected to the machine. Two and Fourteen watch events unfold in Six's visions of the party, and then insert, separately, the dossiers for "A" and "B", agents with known ties to Six. During the first night with "A", a defector, Six refuses to sell his secrets to "A", and then escapes from being kidnapped by "A" and his henchmen. During the second night with "B", a female spy, Six avoids answering her questions regarding his departure. Fourteen uses the machine to speak directly to Six via "B", but he becomes suspicious and when "B" is threatened by hostile agents to be killed, he does not stop to save her. Two determines that neither "A" nor "B" is the person they seek, and Six is returned each night to his home. After the second night, dim memories of the experiment lead Six to follow Fourteen around The Village, eventually coming across her laboratory. He dilutes the final injection after verifying the dossier for "C". That (third) night, Six fakes drinking the drugged tea, and instead acts drugged before he is taken back to the laboratory.

Two uses the final dossier on "C", whose true identity is unknown beyond ties to Six, with the dream state machine. The visions they see of the event are blurred and distorted, a factor that Fourteen attributes to the repeated use of the process. In the dream, it is revealed that "C" is really Madame Engadine, but she explains that she must take him to her superior, whom Fourteen calls "D". To Two's shock, Number Six reveals that "D" is Number Two. As Two and Fourteen watch in surprise, they discover that Six has full control of his dream state. He returns to the laboratory and speaks directly to the dream versions of Two and Fourteen. He hands the dream version of Two an envelope which they had believed to contain secret information to sell, but which turns out to be simply travel brochures, and explains that his resignation was not due to having sold out. As the dream ends, the broken Two is startled as the phone from Number One ominously rings.

== Cast ==
- Colin Gordon as Number Two
- Sheila Allen as Number Fourteen
- Peter Bowles as A
- Annette Carell as B
- Katherine Kath as Madame Engadine
- Georgina Cookson as Blonde Lady
- Lucille Soong as Flower girl
- Bettina Le Beau (credited as "Bettine Le Beau") as Maid at party

== Broadcast ==
The broadcast date of the episode varied in different ITV regions of the UK. The episode was first shown at 7:30pm on Friday 13 October 1967 on ATV Midlands and Grampian Television, on Sunday 15 October on ATV London, Southern Television, Westward Television and Tyne-Tees; on Friday 13 October on Anglia Television, on Thursday 2 November on Border Television and on Friday 10 November on Granada Television in the North West.

Scottish Television originally scheduled the episode to be broadcast on Friday 19 October, one week after the previous episode "The Chimes of Big Ben". However, a power cut hit the Scottish station that evening, preventing the episode from being broadcast. The following Friday, Scottish continued with "Free For All", thus deviating from the standard UK broadcast order. Scottish Television eventually broadcast "A, B and C" on Thursday 23 November, as the seventh episode, one week after "Many Happy Returns" and one week before "Dance of the Dead".

The aggregate viewing figures for the ITV regions that debuted the season in 1967 have been estimated at 10.9 million. In Northern Ireland, the episode did not debut until Saturday 20 January 1968, and in Wales, the episode was not broadcast until Wednesday 21 January 1970.

== Sources ==
- Fairclough, Robert, ed. (2004). The Prisoner: The Original Scripts. Vol. 1. foreword by Lewis Greifer. Reynolds & Hearn. ISBN 978-1-903111-76-5. OCLC 61145235. – script of episode
