= Dies Irae (disambiguation) =

Dies irae (Day of wrath) is a 13th-century Latin hymn.

Dies Irae may also refer to:

== Music ==
- Dies Irae (band), a Polish death metal band
- Dies Irae (Devil Doll album), a 1996 album by the band Devil Doll
- Dies Irae (Noir Désir album), a 1994 live album by the band Noir Désir
- Dies Irae (Tina Guo album), a 2021 album by Tina Guo
- "Dies Irae", a song by Bathory from the 1988 album Blood Fire Death
- "Dies Irae", a song by the German band Beyond the Black from the 2016 album Lost in Forever
- "Dies Irae", a song by Zbigniew Preisner from the 1998 album Requiem for My Friend
- "Dies Irae", a song by Rotting Christ from the 2019 album The Heretics

== Literature ==
- Dies Irae, a 2014 novella by William R. Forstchen
- "Dies Irae", a short story by Slovak novelist Martin Kukučín
- "Dies Irae", a 1985 short story by Charles Sheffield
- "Dies Irae", a 2019 English translation of a philosophical essay by Jean-Luc Nancy

== Media ==
- Dies irae (visual novel), a Japanese visual novel originally released in 2007
  - Dies Irae (TV series), an anime adaptation of the visual novel
- Diés Iraé, a 2025 Indian-Malayalam horror thriller film

== See also ==
- Day of Wrath, a 1943 Danish drama film
- Day of Wrath (1985 film), a 1985 Soviet science-fiction film
- Day of Wrath (2006 film), a 2006 British-Hungarian drama film
