= Cease Fire (Star Trek: Enterprise) =

- Star Trek: Enterprise episode
- Episode no.: Season 2 Episode 15
- Directed by: David Straiton
- Written by: Chris Black
- Production code: 215
- Original air date: February 12, 2003

Guest appearances
- Vaughn Armstrong - Admiral Forrest; Jeffrey Combs - Commander Shran; Suzie Plakson - Tarah; Gary Graham - Ambassador Soval; John Balma - Muroc; Zane Cassidy - Andorian Soldier; Christopher Shea - Andorian Captain Telev

Episode chronology
← Previous "Stigma"	Next → "Future Tense"
- Star Trek: Enterprise season 2

"Cease Fire" is the 41st episode (production #215) of the television series Star Trek: Enterprise, the 15th episode of the second season. The episode aired on UPN on February 12, 2003. The series, set in the 22nd century of the Star Trek universe, follows the crew of the starship Enterprise, as they explore the galaxy under command of Captain Jonathan Archer.

In the episode, Archer attempts to negotiate a cease fire between the Andorians and the Vulcans.

== Plot ==
The Andorians and the Vulcans are locked in battle over a planet situated on the frontier between their two systems. The Andorians call it "Weytahn," and the Vulcans "Paan Mokar", and it is claimed by both sides. Andorian Commander Shran, however, has broken the treaty and reoccupied a settlement. With the Vulcans calling for a cease fire, Shran seeks Captain Archer's help with negotiations. Vulcan Ambassador Soval is reluctant to bring Archer in as mediator, but three Vulcans have been taken hostage, and Shran only trusts Archer (particularly since the events of "The Andorian Incident").

Archer and Sub-Commander T'Pol head down to the planet for a meeting with Shran. His lieutenant, Tarah, is especially wary of T'Pol, but Archer manages to convince Shran to release one of the hostages as a sign of good faith. Soval then agrees to negotiations, but remains skeptical. Meanwhile, Shran has a tense moment with Tarah, who objects to his attempts to negotiate with the Vulcans. She would rather fight to reclaim the planet for the Andorians. As the shuttlepod nears the planet, it is fired on and forced to crash-land. Soval suggests the Andorians are trying to sabotage the peace talks, but Archer doesn't believe Shran would resort to such tactics. Shran is furious that Archer's shuttle was downed, but Tarah claims that it was the Vulcans trying to frame the Andorians.

Meanwhile, on Enterprise, Commander Tucker must keep the Vulcan and Andorian vessels from firing on each another. To do so, he maneuvers between the two groups. Down on the surface, Archer, T'Pol, and Soval are attempting to make their way to Shran's location, when Soval is shot. Archer discovers that renegade Andorians are behind the attack, and captures Tarah. She initially denies involvement, but eventually confesses, and angrily informs Shran that there are others who feel the same way. With the situation under control, and with Archer's help, the two sides agree to a ceasefire and continued peace talks.

== Production ==
Guest star Suzie Plakson appears as Tarah, the first female Andorian seen in Star Trek. Plakson made several previous appearances in Star Trek, as a Vulcan, (Note: Dr. Selar, in Star Trek: The Next Generation "The Schizoid Man") a Klingon (Note: K'Ehleyr in Star Trek: The Next Generation", "The Emissary", and "Reunion") and a Q. (Note: Star Trek: Voyager "The Q and the Grey")

== Reception ==
In a 2015 SyFy interview with Scott Bakula and Dominic Keating, this episode was a recommended favorite of theirs.

Den of Geek recommended this episode to understand the importance of the Shran character to the show.

The Digital Fix said that this episode was one of the strongest in season two, and praised the character development of Shran and Soval.

In his 2022 rewatch, Keith DeCandido of Tor.com gave it 8 out of 10.

== Releases ==
The first home media release of "Cease Fire" was as part of the season two DVD box set, released in the United States on July 26, 2005. A release on Blu-ray Disc for season two occurred on August 20, 2013.
