= Future Tense (Star Trek: Enterprise) =

- Star Trek: Enterprise episode
- Episode no.: Season 2 Episode 16
- Directed by: James Whitmore, Jr.
- Written by: Mike Sussman; Phyllis Strong
- Production code: 216
- Original air date: February 19, 2003

Guest appearances
- Vaughn Armstrong - Admiral Forrest; Cullen Douglas - Suliban Soldier

Episode chronology
← Previous "Cease Fire"	Next → "Canamar"
- Star Trek: Enterprise season 2

"Future Tense" is the 42nd episode (production #216) of the television series Star Trek: Enterprise, the 16th of the second season. Set in the 22nd century of the Star Trek universe, a spaceship and its crew deal with aliens as they explore space.

The NX-01 Enterprise finds a derelict ship, apparently from the future, and is attacked by Suliban, and later Tholian, ships seeking its possession.

This episode aired on UPN on February 19, 2003. It was written by Mike Sussman and Phyllis Strong, and directed by James Whitmore, Jr. Vaughn Armstrong guest stars as Admiral Forrest, and the episode has additional music done by composer Dennis McCarthy.

== Plot ==
The discovery of a derelict pod with a long-dead human pilot opens up a mystery. Some of the crew speculate he is the first human to invent warp drive technology, Zefram Cochrane, but DNA profiling reveal the remains are not his. Commander Tucker and Lieutenant Reed examine the mysterious pod and discover, via a floor panel, that it is larger on the inside than the outside. They also recover a device from the core which still has a weak energy signature. Shortly afterwards, a Suliban ship arrives and claims salvage rights, but Captain Archer refuses to yield it without explanation. They open fire, and beam in a boarding party, but are finally repelled.

Undaunted, Enterprise then sets course to rendezvous with Tal'Kir, a Vulcan ship. Doctor Phlox's scans reveal the dead pilot has multi-generational DNA fragments from several alien species including Vulcan, Terrelian, and Rigelian. Seeking answers, Archer and Sub-Commander T'Pol enter time-traveler Agent Daniels' cabin, and they learn from his encyclopedic database that the pod is from the 31st century. Meanwhile, Tucker and Reed, on returning to the pod, get stuck in a recurring time-loop. This heightens T'Pol's concerns and she discusses the situation with Archer, who feels they must have more information on the Temporal Cold War.

Tholians arrive, demanding the pod and warning Enterprise of temporal radiation. Again, Archer refuses, and they leave after he threatens to destroy it. The crew, reaching the rendezvous destination, discover that the Tholians have disabled the Tal'Kir, and soon disable Enterprise as well. The Suliban arrive and a battle ensues between them and the Tholians. The Tholians succeed in destroying the Suliban ships. After working through another time-loop, Archer and Reed booby-trap the pod and send it out into space, but the Tholians immediately disarm the device. Tucker then gets the temporal distress beacon to power up, and soon the future ship and its contents dematerialize. The Tholians leave, and Enterprise assists the Vulcan ship, as Archer's way of thanking the Vulcan High Command for their support and help.

== Production ==
The episode was originally titled "Crash Landing" before it was changed to "Future Tense".

Director James Whitmore, Jr. previously directed the episode "Acquisition".

The episode mostly used existing sets. A new set was built for the remains of the salvaged vessel, and a wall for the Suliban ship shown on the viewscreen.

== Reception ==
"Future Tense" was first broadcast February 19, 2003, on UPN. It had a Nielsen ratings share of 2.9/4. It had a total average audience of 4.62 million viewers.

Higgy Pop noted this episode as one of the time travel stories of the Star Trek franchise. The review also compares the spacecraft they discover to the TARDIS of the Doctor Who television show, noting, "The pod and the Doctor's TARDIS are both bigger on the inside than the outside, and able to travel across time."

Jammer's Reviews described the episode as "hardly informative or conclusive" but "pretty fun." Jamahl Epsicokhan said that the plot didn't "supply much that's tangible" to the temporal cold war story arc. He saw it more as "a means to an end — the means being the story-line and the end being sci-fi action" concluding that the "ideal situation" would have the "particular elements of means and end reversed."

The Digital Fix said that "Future Tense" was "one of the highlights of the season" and noted how it connected to the temporal war story arc, begun earlier in the series.

In his 2022 rewatch, Keith DeCandido of Tor.com gave it 3 out of 10.

== Releases ==
The first home media release of "Future Tense" was as part of the season two DVD box set, released in the United States on July 26, 2005. A release on Blu-ray Disc for season two occurred on August 20, 2013.
