= The General (The Prisoner) =

- The Prisoner episode
- Episode no.: Series 1 Episode 6
- Directed by: Peter Graham Scott
- Written by: Lewis Greifer; (as Joshua Adam)
- Production code: 10
- Original air date: 3 November 1967

Guest appearances
- Colin Gordon as Number Two; John Castle as Number Twelve; Peter Howell as The Professor; Betty McDowall as The Professor's wife

Episode chronology
← Previous "The Schizoid Man"	Next → "Many Happy Returns"

"The General" is an episode of the allegorical British science fiction TV series, The Prisoner. It was written by "Joshua Adam" – a pseudonym for Lewis Greifer – and directed by Peter Graham Scott. It was the tenth to be produced and was the sixth episode to be broadcast in the UK on ITV (ATV Midlands and Grampian) on Friday 3 November 1967. It first aired in the United States on CBS on Saturday 13 July 1968.

The episode stars Patrick McGoohan as Number Six and features Colin Gordon as Number Two, in the second of his two appearances. The central themes of this episode are rote learning and indoctrination.

== Plot summary ==
Number Six – along with the rest of the population of the Village – is subjected to a new mind-altering education technology called "Speed Learn" which can instill a three-year university-level course in history over a television screen in just three minutes.

It was invented and is "taught" by an avuncular individual known as "The Professor" who is nevertheless seen trying to escape from the Village along the beach at the episode outset. Number Six finds a tape recorder in which the professor's true feelings are revealed, mysteriously discarded on the beach. He hides the recorder in the sand at a location he can find again. He witnesses the professor, after being recaptured, proceeding with the education programme which instills a detailed, but fairly sterile, set of data on "European history since Napoleon" into all Village residents' minds. Speed Learn is also apparently supported by someone known as the "General". Number Two tries to find the tape recorder. He assumes Number Six has it. He quizzes Number Six on the lecture, and Six seems to surprise himself by answering all the questions correctly.

After Number Two leaves, Number Six goes back to the beach to find the tape recorder he hid in the sand only to find that Village resident Number Twelve, a handsome young man, has it. Number Twelve agrees to help Number Six but Twelve is also an intimate of Number Two, with whom he discusses Number Six derogatorily, indicating Twelve may be an embedded guard. On the tape the professor states that Speed Learn is an abomination and slavery, and that the "General" must be destroyed.

Number Six discusses art with the Professor's wife, who claims she and her husband came "voluntarily", while he finishes sketching her in a general's uniform. When she sees it, her calm and pleasant façade turns furious and she tears the sketch in two. He searches her lodgings, finding busts carved of him and of Number Two, and smashes a lifelike effigy representing the sleeping Professor.

Number Six fears Speed Learn could eventually be used for mind control. Number Twelve assists him by giving him a set of passes and a pen that will play the professor's confession. Before the next lesson is to be broadcast, Number Six infiltrates the projection room and installs his own message. He is detected and thwarted in this attempt, and the real message is broadcast.

Number Six is interrogated but refuses to reveal the complicity of Number Twelve. Number Two claims that the "General" will know who his accomplice was. The "General" is revealed to be a sophisticated, experimental mainframe computer which has purportedly been programmed to be able to answer any question put to it. As Number Two is about to ask who assisted Number Six, Number Six states that there is a question that the "General" cannot answer. Number Two arrogantly accepts the challenge; when Number Six feeds his brief question into the "General", the computer begins to sputter and emit smoke after its data banks fail to find the answer to the question.

Fearing the worst, the Professor tries to shut down the computer, and as it begins to overload, Number Twelve tries to rescue the professor. The "General" self-destructs, killing both men in the process. A distraught Number Two asks Number Six what the question was. The General, and Number Two's plans, were destroyed by a simple epistemological trick: "Why?"

== Reception ==
Chris Gregory believes the episode to be "memorable" and "highly melodramatic". He describes the ending as "[fitting in] well with the subtext of the series", but also say "the revelation that 'The General' is a powerful computer is a stock science fiction device." Alain Carrazé and Hélène Oswald compare the ending of the episode to the story of David and Goliath. The fact that the Prisoner defeats the General with a single word is like David killing Goliath with a sling. They describe the music used during scene involving the Prisoner, Number Two and the Professor's wife as "one of the strangest musical themes in the series".

== Broadcast ==
The broadcast date of the episode varied in different ITV regions of the UK. The episode was first shown at 7:30pm on Friday 3 November 1967 on ATV Midlands and Grampian Television, on Sunday 5 November on ATV London, Southern Television, Westward Television and Tyne-Tees; on Thursday 9 November on Scottish Television, on Friday 10 November on Anglia Television, on Thursday 23 November on Border Television and on Friday 1 December on Granada Television in the North West. The aggregate viewing figures for the ITV regions that debuted the season in 1967 have been estimated at 9.8 million. In Northern Ireland, the episode did not debut until Saturday 10 February 1968, and in Wales, the episode was not broadcast until Wednesday 11 February 1970.

== Sources ==
- Carrazé, Alain; Oswald, Hélène (1989). The Prisoner. London: W H Allen. pp. 91, 94. ISBN 1-85227-338-0.
- Gregory, Chris (1997). Be Seeing You... Decoding The Prisoner. Lutton, Bedfordshire: John Libbey Media. p. 95. ISBN 1-860205-21-6.
- Fairclough, Robert, ed. (2005). The Prisoner: The Original Scripts. Vol. 1. foreword by Lewis Greifer. Reynolds & Hearn. ISBN 978-1-903111-76-5. OCLC 61145235. – script of episode
