= Sybil Cookson =

Sybil Irene Eleanor Taylor Cookson (1890–1963) was a journalist and writer of romantic novels. She wrote under the pen-name Sydney Tremayne. Her pseudonym is often confused with two male authors of the same name: Sydney (Durward) Tremayne (1912–1986) the Scottish journalist and poet, and Sydney Tremayne, an American investment strategist.

== Biography ==
From the 1979 David & Charles reprint of Tatlings (1922):

"Sydney Tremayne was the pseudonym of Sybil Taylor, who was born in 1890, the first child of John Taylor, Squire of Carshalton, then a little country village. With the advent of an heir the village was given a holiday and bonfires were lit. When a girl was born, the village was sent back to work and the bonfires extinguished.

With what may have been a delayed reaction, at nineteen she ran away 'to live in an attic and write.' And write she did – three novels, The Auction Mart [1915, filmed in 1920], The Broken Sign-post [1922] and Eve. The first two were best sellers, the third not so successful.

In 1913 she married Roger Cookson, a racing driver with the Bentley team, but after World War I she ran away again, this time from her husband, taking her two daughters with her. This was when she turned to journalism and joined the Tatler. From there she left to edit Eve: The Lady's Pictorial (before it became Britannia and Eve), and was the film critic, fashion editor and beauty specialist; she was also writing a monthly article for the Tatler called "Nights Out".

She retired in 1938 and never wrote, or wanted to, again. During World War II she returned to Roger Cookson (to his immense surprise) and stayed with him until her death in 1963."

She was the granddaughter of Sir James Crichton-Browne and was educated at Wycombe Abbey and in Paris.

As Sybil Cookson, she published the novel Echo... (1919) and co-edited the memoir The Boy with the Guns (1919) by Lieutenant George W. Taylor.

She published Tatlings (1922), illustrated by Fish, a popular collection of self-penned epigrams that had previously appeared weekly in the Tatler.

After separating from her husband in 1938, Cookson moved with her two young daughters (one of whom was the actress Georgina Cookson [1918–2011]) into Bolton House, a red-brick Georgian building on three floors in Hampstead, London, with the painter Gluck (1895–1978), whom she had met through her friend Arthur Watts.
