= Many Happy Returns (The Prisoner) =

- The Prisoner episode
- Episode no.: Series 1 Episode 7
- Directed by: Patrick McGoohan (credited as Joseph Serf)
- Written by: Anthony Skene
- Production code: 13
- Original air date: 10 November 1967

Guest appearances
- Donald Sinden; Patrick Cargill; Georgina Cookson

Episode chronology
← Previous "The General"	Next → "Dance of the Dead"

"Many Happy Returns" is an episode of the allegorical British science fiction TV series The Prisoner. It was written by Anthony Skene and directed by Patrick McGoohan (using the pseudonym Joseph Serf). The thirteenth episode produced, it was the seventh episode to be broadcast in the UK on ITV (ATV Midlands and Grampian) on Friday 10 November 1967, and first aired in the United States on CBS on Saturday 20 July 1968.

The episode stars Patrick McGoohan as Number Six and features as Number Two Georgina Cookson. The episode was the last that series co-creator and script editor George Markstein worked on, due to creative differences between him and McGoohan over how the series should end.

== Plot summary ==
Number Six awakens to find the Village completely deserted, along with water and electricity shut off as well. He sees this as an opportunity to escape. He takes numerous photos before assembling a raft and taking flight by sea for 25 days. He takes careful notes as to headings and times as best he can, but has an unfriendly encounter with gun-runners who steal his belongings and throw him in the sea. Clambering on board their boat, he takes control of it, but is later overwhelmed and ends up on a deserted beach. Wandering, he encounters a small band of Romani who speak no English. He sees a British policeman soon after.

He eludes what appears to be a police manhunt and stows away on a truck which takes him to what he now recognises as London. A Mrs. Butterworth now occupies his old townhouse and drives his Lotus Seven. She is unperturbed when he approaches her, seems intrigued by his plight, and feeds and clothes him. He mentions that the next day is his birthday. Receiving Number Six's promises that he will return, Mrs. Butterworth says she might even bake him a birthday cake. He returns to the underground car park/office from the theme sequence, where he presents himself to his old boss. His photographs and other evidence of The Village meet with considerable scepticism. Former colleagues "The Colonel" and "Thorpe" are not entirely convinced that Number Six has not defected and now returned as a double agent, but after verifying all the details of his escape and evasion story, they seem to be more reassured.

With the assistance of some military officers and a map, they determine the general vicinity of the Village ("coast of Morocco, southwest of Portugal and Spain"; "might be an island"). He leads a jet fighter pilot in a sweep of the area and spots the Village from the air, but it turns out the pilot was switched at the base with an agent of The Village, who causes Number Six to be unceremoniously ejected. Number Six parachutes in, and is greeted in his cottage by the new Number Two: Mrs. Butterworth. She offers him "Many happy returns!" and a birthday cake, while Village residents once again parade outside on the piazza.

== Cast ==
- Donald Sinden as The Colonel
- Patrick Cargill as Thorpe
- Georgina Cookson as Mrs. Butterworth/Number Two
- Brian Worth as Group Captain
- Richard Caldicot as Commander
- Dennis Chinnery as Gunther
- Jon Laurimore as Ernst
- Niké Arrighi as Gypsy girl
- Grace Arnold as Maid
- Larry Taylor as Gypsy man

== Production ==
Although Number Two in this episode is female, the opening credits sequence features the unidentified, "generic" (male) Number Two, voiced by Robert Rietti that appears in several other episodes. The sequence also features an additional shot of Rover on the beach where Number Two would have been shown, to maintain her anonymity until the end of the episode. The Number Two in this episode is one of only a few in the entire series to wear a black identity badge.

This episode is unusual in that the entire first act, showing Number Six escaping from the Village and making his way to London, features no dialogue, save for some German spoken by the gunrunners on the boat Number Six finds himself aboard. Number Six himself says nothing until over twenty minutes into the episode.

The London scenes in this episode are set on 18 March. Number Six mentions the next day is his birthday (19 March was McGoohan's actual birthday). Some of the stock footage used during the aerial search for the Village is the same used to depict Shinda Shima in the eponymous Danger Man episode.

The airfield (where Number Six boards a Gloster Meteor) used in this episode is the former RAF Chalgrove / Chalgrove Airfield in Oxfordshire, now privately owned by Martin-Baker. The black cat seen in "Dance of the Dead" also appears in this episode.

When Number Six asks his former boss "Anyone at home?", the man behind the desk, as in the opening credits, is George Markstein.

== Broadcast ==
The broadcast date of the episode varied in different ITV regions of the UK. The episode was first shown at 7:30pm on Friday 10 November 1967 on ATV Midlands and Grampian Television, on Sunday 12 November on ATV London, Southern Television, Westward Television and Tyne-Tees; on Thursday 16 November on Scottish Television, on Friday 17 November on Anglia Television, on Thursday 30 November on Border Television and on Friday 8 December on Granada Television in the North West. The aggregate viewing figures for the ITV regions that debuted the season in 1967 have been estimated at 10.3 million. In Northern Ireland, the episode did not debut until Saturday 17 February 1968, and in Wales, the episode was not broadcast until Wednesday 18 February 1970.

== Sources ==
- Fairclough, Robert, ed. (2004). The Prisoner: The Original Scripts. Vol. 1. foreword by Lewis Greifer. Reynolds & Hearn. ISBN 978-1-903111-76-5. OCLC 61145235. – script of episode
