= Checkmate (The Prisoner) =

- The Prisoner episode
- Episode no.: Series 1 Episode 9
- Directed by: Don Chaffey
- Written by: Gerald Kelsey
- Production code: 3
- Original air date: 24 November 1967

Guest appearances
- Peter Wyngarde; Ronald Radd; Rosalie Crutchley; George Coulouris; Patricia Jessel

Episode chronology
← Previous "Dance of the Dead"	Next → "Hammer into Anvil"

"Checkmate" is an episode of the allegorical British science fiction TV series The Prisoner. It was written by Gerald Kelsey and directed by Don Chaffey and third to be produced. It was the ninth episode to be broadcast in the UK on ITV (ATV Midlands and Grampian) on Friday 24 November 1967 and first aired in the United States on CBS on Saturday 17 August 1968.

The episode stars Patrick McGoohan as Number Six and features Peter Wyngarde as Number Two.

== Plot summary ==
Number Six is persuaded to participate, as the white queen's pawn, in an oversized game of chess using people as pieces. A rebellious rook (Number Fifty-eight) is taken to the hospital for "evaluation". After the game, Number Six talks with the Chess Master (Number Fourteen), who comments that one can tell who is a prisoner and who a guardian "[B]y their disposition. By the moves they make."

Number Six is later invited to visit the hospital to observe the fate of Number Fifty-eight (the rook), and sees him subjected to Pavlovian mind-control treatment. The woman playing the queen (Number Eight), who had fraternised with Number Six during the game, is subjected to hypnosis to make her fall in love with him and report his whereabouts should he attempt to escape again. Number Six shuns her, but seeks an alliance with Number Fifty-eight and other villagers that he now believes he can identify as prisoners, not guardians.

They attempt an escape by making a two-way radio out of various pilfered electronic parts and then hailing a passing ship with a Mayday distress call, pretending to be a crashing airliner. Number Six discovers, however, that again he has been a pawn – Number Fifty-eight had mistaken the strong-minded Number Six for a guardian. Believing that the escape attempt was a test of his loyalty, he reported it all to Number Two.

== Cast ==
- Peter Wyngarde as Number Two
- Ronald Radd as Rook
- Rosalie Crutchley as Queen
- George Coulouris as Man with stick
- Patricia Jessel as First Psychiatrist
- Bee Duffell as Second psychiatrist
- Basil Dignam as Supervisor
- Danvers Walker as Painter
- Denis Shaw as Shopkeeper
- Victor Platt as Assistant supervisor
- Shivaun O'Casey as Nurse
- Geoffrey Reed as Skipper
- Terence Donovan as Sailor
- Joe Dunne as 1st Tower guard
- Romo Gorrara as 2nd Tower guard

== Production ==
"Checkmate" was the third episode to be produced, following "Free for All", the second. As this was an early episode in production, there is a reference in "Checkmate" to Number Six being "new" in The Village.

The episode's original title was to be "The Queen's Pawn", a play on the fact that Number Six had recently been in "Her Majesty's service". At the beginning of the episode, the lawn is seen uncovered by chessboard squares; a few moments later, it is shown as the chessboard. The chessboard remained in place for a week during September 1966 during filming of this episode; when it was removed, the grass had been lightened and the pattern is clearly visible in prior episodes.

The chess game is recreated annually by enthusiasts of the programme at their annual convention, held at Portmeirion.

== Broadcast ==
The broadcast date of the episode varied in different ITV regions of the UK. The episode was first shown at 7:30pm on Friday 24 November 1967 on ATV Midlands and Grampian Television, on Friday 1 December on Anglia Television, on Sunday 3 December on ATV London, whose broadcasts were also taken up by Southern Television, Westward Television and Tyne-Tees; on Thursday 7 December on Scottish Television, on Thursday 14 December on Border Television and on Friday 22 December on Granada Television in the North West. The aggregate viewing figures for the ITV regions that debuted the season in 1967 have been estimated at 9.1 million. In Northern Ireland, the episode did not debut until Saturday 2 March 1968, and in Wales, the episode was not broadcast until Wednesday 4 March 1970.

== Context ==
Apart from the obvious metaphor that life is a game of chess, the episode deals with conformity and pressures to conform, particularly peer pressure. Parallels have been drawn with the Milgram experiment, Asch conformity experiments and the Stanford prison experiment. Similar techniques are used to make Number Six conform, hoping he will reveal the secret of his resignation. However, Number Six discovers, as usual, that his trust is misplaced and the distinction between prisoner and warder remains blurred.

The piece played by Number Six in the chess game is the same as that played by Alice throughout the story in Lewis Carroll's Through the Looking-Glass (1871) – White Queen's pawn.

== Sources ==
- White, Matthew; Ali, Jaffer (1988). The Official Prisoner Companion. London: Sidgwick & Jackson. ISBN 0-283-99598-X.
- Fairclough, Robert, ed. (February 2006). The Prisoner: The Original Scripts. Vol. 2. foreword by Roger Parkes. Reynolds & Hearn. ISBN 978-1-903111-81-9. OCLC 61145235. – script of episode
