= Confetti Check A-O.K. =

- UFO episode
- Episode no.: Episode 11
- Directed by: David Lane
- Written by: Tony Barwick
- Cinematography by: Brendan J. Stafford
- Editing by: Alan Killick
- Production code: 14
- Original air date: 23 November 1970

Cast
- Ed Bishop as Commander Straker; George Sewell as Colonel Freeman; Suzanne Neve as Mary Straker; Grant Taylor as General Henderson; Dolores Mantez as Nina Barry; Keith Alexander as Keith Ford; Jeremy Wilkin as Gordon Maxwell; Ayshea Brough as Lieutenant Johnson; Michael Nightingale as Mary's father; Jack May as the British UN delegate; Jeffrey Segal as Duval, French delegate; Gordon Sterne as the German delegate; Alan Tilvern as the US delegate; Tom Oliver as a hospital doctor; Julian Grant as Lieutenant Grey; Michael Forrest as a security officer; Shane Rimmer as a CIA officer; Geoffrey Hinsliff as a hotel clerk; Donald Pelmear as an estate agent; Antonia Ellis as Joan Harrington

Episode chronology
← Previous "Court Martial"	Next → "Kill Straker!"

"Confetti Check A-O.K." is the 11th episode of UFO, a British science fiction television series made by Century 21 Productions for ITC Entertainment. The 14th episode to be filmed, it was written by Tony Barwick and directed by David Lane. It was shot in October 1969 at MGM-British Studios in Borehamwood and on location in Hertfordshire.

Set in the 1980s, UFO depicts a secret organisation – Supreme Headquarters Alien Defence Organisation (SHADO) – attempting to thwart an alien invasion involving UFOs. "Confetti Check A-O.K." is a flashback episode in which SHADO commander-in-chief Ed Straker (Ed Bishop) thinks back to the organisation's beginnings and the toll it has taken on his private life. The episode provides backstory to the series' premise. It also presents the origins of Straker's troubled relationship with his ex-wife and son, who were introduced six episodes earlier in "A Question of Priorities".

"Confetti Check A-O.K." first aired on 23 November 1970 on the CTV Television Network in Canada. In the UK, it was first broadcast by Tyne Tees Television on 16 December 1970. The episode was disliked by ITC, whose executives criticised its human-interest story and lack of science fiction elements.

== Plot ==
Arriving at SHADO headquarters, Commander Straker finds the personnel celebrating Lieutenant David Grey, who has just become a father. This prompts Straker to cast his mind back to the formation of SHADO, the birth of his son, and the failure of his marriage.

Ten years earlier, Colonel Straker is an intelligence officer in the United States Air Force. After surviving the UFO attack that injured General Henderson, Straker marries a British woman called Mary. His RAF friend Alec Freeman is best man. Straker and Mary are about to go on their honeymoon when Straker is summoned to a meeting at the United Nations headquarters. Delegates from the major powers have convened to discuss the funding of SHADO, a covert Earth defence force that will take years to set up. The United States is insisting on an American commander-in-chief. Straker nominates Henderson for the post, but the delegates choose him instead. Straker will still report to Henderson, who has been made head of SHADO's financer, the International Astrophysical Commission.

Straker and Mary buy a house in the English countryside, but their domestic life is disrupted by the demands of Straker's new role, which he is required to keep secret from Mary. Freeman becomes SHADO's first recruit. Straker, Freeman and Henderson draw up plans for selection and training, a front organisation (the future Harlington-Straker Film Studios), and an underground complex to house SHADO's headquarters. As Straker spends longer hours away from home and the strain on his marriage increases, Mary reveals she is pregnant. Mary's mother suspects Straker's absences are due to an extramarital affair. Mary rejects these concerns, but her worst fears are confirmed when her mother hires a private detective who photographs Straker accompanying a woman to a townhouse. Unknown to Mary, the woman is SHADO recruit Nina Barry, and she and Straker are attending a meeting with other recruits.

Returning home, Straker finds Mary with her bags packed: she is leaving him. An argument ensues, during which Straker slaps Mary, who falls down the stairs. She is taken to hospital with internal bleeding, necessitating life-saving surgery and the premature birth of their son. She awakes with her father at her bedside but no sign of Straker, who has been called away to another meeting. Straker knows his marriage is over, but Freeman congratulates him on becoming a father.

In the present, Straker orders Lieutenant Grey to take parental leave. He enters his office and sits at his desk, deep in thought.

== Production ==
According to the script, the events in Straker's flashback took place between 1970 and 1972.

Filming of the episode began on 10 October 1969. Location shooting was conducted in Borehamwood, Watford, and elsewhere in Hertfordshire. A Watford hotel provided the exterior of the Strakers' wedding night hotel. Footage of the under-construction Northwick Park Hospital represented a building site that conceals the entrance to SHADO's underground headquarters. In a scene of Straker giving Nina Barry a lift in his car, he drives a Jensen Interceptor that belonged to Reg Hill, one of the series' producers.

Director David Lane regretted Ed Bishop's performance as Straker in the UN scene, believing he played it too much like a "nervous schoolboy" instead of a confident intelligence officer. A deleted scene showed Straker recruiting the future Lieutenant Ford (Keith Alexander) to SHADO.

The episode's original incidental music was recorded on 4 March 1970. Like the later episode "The Psychobombs", "Confetti Check A-O.K." omits the series' usual title sequence and proceeds straight into the opening action and credits.

== Reception ==
According to Paul Cornell, Martin Day and Keith Topping, "Confetti Check A-O.K." is among several UFO episodes that are "almost soap opera, focusing on the effects of SHADO on individual lives". The episode was negatively received by Lew Grade and other ITC executives, who thought its plot strayed too far from the series' science fiction roots. Gerry Anderson, the executive producer, remembered being "heavily criticised for that, particularly by ITC in New York. They reacted by saying, 'Now come on, you're dealing with married life for God's sake, and this is supposed to be a science fiction series!' Whereas on other episodes they had equally said, 'Where are the people? The shows have lots of hardware flying around and guns going off, but where are the people?'" SFX magazine summed up the episode as "a crisp treatise on the clash between work and relationships".

Review website The Anorak Zone considered "Confetti Check A-O.K." the eighth-best episode of UFO. It described the episode as "a perfect character study of the show's troubled lead", even if the Strakers' romance "can be a little syruppy." Chris Dale praised Bishop and Suzanne Neve's (Mary Straker) acting. According to Dale, the fact they portrayed the "frosty post-divorce relationship between Straker and Mary in ['A Question of Priorities'], months before returning to play the happiness of them as newlyweds in 'Confetti Check', says much for the skill of both performers, and there isn't a scene where both are on screen together that isn't fascinating to watch." In contrast, Video Watchdog commented that while the episode "effectively" establishes the acrimony shown in "A Question of Priorities", and serves as a "nice bookend" to the opening of "Identified", its plot is "only moderately interesting".

In a 2005 review, John Kenneth Muir called the episode a "great, underrated sci-fi gem" that shows "exactly what Ed Straker has lost by opting to command SHADO [...] his youth, his innocence, his wife, and his marriage. And the job will still take more, as 'A Question of Priorities' proves." In a later review, Muir considered it the best episode of the series, describing it as so "emotionally wrenching" because it reveals both SHADO's origins and the reasons for Straker's repression. He wrote that it presents a dilemma for Straker: by not breaking security protocol and telling Mary about SHADO, he destroys his marriage. Muir also noted that while some UFO episodes focus on the financial burden of SHADO's war against the aliens, "Confetti Check A-O.K." and others "contend with the human, personal cost of fighting that war." Muir also praised aspects of the cinematography, arguing these underline Straker's forced emotional detachment. He noted that in the hospital scenes, Straker is shown standing impassively at a rain-lashed window: "[W]e see Straker behind two barriers, the rain and the window frame, and thus get the distinct sense of his isolation from those he loves [...T]he rain does the crying for Straker, representing his interior emotional state." He also applauded the final wide shot of Straker, sitting alone in his office, as an encapsulation of the character's isolation.

In an 1997 interview, Bishop named this episode and "A Question of Priorities" his favourite episodes of UFO.
