= Unnatural Selection (Star Trek: The Next Generation) =

- Star Trek: The Next Generation episode
- Episode no.: Season 2 Episode 7
- Directed by: Paul Lynch
- Written by: John Mason; Mike Gray
- Cinematography by: Edward R. Brown
- Production code: 133
- Original air date: January 30, 1989

Guest appearances
- Patricia Smith – Dr. Sara Kingsley; Colm Meaney – Miles O'Brien; J. Patrick McNamara – Capt. Taggart; Scott Trost – Ensign

Episode chronology
← Previous "The Schizoid Man"	Next → "A Matter of Honor"
- Star Trek: The Next Generation season 2

"Unnatural Selection" is the seventh episode of the second season of the American science fiction television series Star Trek: The Next Generation, the 33rd episode overall. It was first broadcast on January 30, 1989. It was written by John Mason and Mike Gray, and directed by Paul Lynch.

Set in the 24th century, the series follows the adventures of the Starfleet crew of the Federation starship Enterprise-D. In this episode, the Enterprise encounters a Starfleet supply ship where everyone has died from rapid aging. They must find the cause before scientists on a research colony suffer the same fate.

The episode received a 1989 Emmy award nomination for hair styling.

== Plot ==
The Federation starship Enterprise, under the command of Captain Jean-Luc Picard (Patrick Stewart), receives a distress call from the USS Lantree and finds it adrift. The Enterprise taps into the Lantree's viewer and finds that the crew appear to have died from old age, even though many were as young as the Enterprise crew. The only evidence of any medical problems was a harmless case of Thelusian flu in one of the ship's officers. They discover that the Lantree's last port-of-call was the Darwin Genetic Research Station on Gagarin IV. Captain Picard orders a quarantine warning broadcast to be set on the Lantree and orders the Enterprise to Gagarin IV. As they near the planet, they receive another distress call from the station's researchers, all of whom have started a rapid onset of geriatric phenomena they believe is tied to the Lantree.

When the Enterprise arrives in orbit, the research team's leader pleads to have the station's genetically engineered children brought aboard, asserting that they are safe, as they have been in isolation from the rest of the station. Picard is concerned with exposing the Enterprise to the same phenomenon that is affecting the station but allows his Chief Medical Officer Dr. Pulaski (Diana Muldaur) to have one of the children beamed aboard encased in styrolite, which shields the rest of the ship from possible contamination. The child, a male teenager, is brought to sick bay and Dr. Pulaski is fascinated by him, describing him as the "next step in human evolution". She convinces Picard to allow her to take a shuttle away from the Enterprise, so that she can examine the child outside of the styrolite without exposing the rest of the crew and recruits Commander Data (Brent Spiner) as pilot, who as an android is immune to infection. When she removes the protective material, the boy awakens and telepathically communicates with her. She is suddenly struck by joint pain and recognizes that she must be experiencing with the same condition as the Lantree and station crew, so instead of returning to the Enterprise she orders Data to pilot the shuttle to the research station.

Dr. Pulaski continues to investigate the cause of the syndrome at the station. She learns that the children have been genetically engineered with highly aggressive immune systems that fight pathogens by genetically altering them – not just inside the children's bodies, but also in the environment outside of their bodies. Recalling the Lantree officer with Thelusian flu, Dr. Pulaski postulates that the children's immune systems' reaction to the virus has created airborne antibodies that are attacking all living things, and this manifests as altering the DNA of normal humanoids to cause them to age rapidly and die.

With this information, the crew of the Enterprise determine that the transporters may be able to remove the antibodies and re-code an infected individual's DNA to normal - but only with a previous bio-pattern of that individual, which at first they do not have for Dr. Pulaski due to her avoidance of transporter technology. The crew solves this by finding samples of Pulaski's hair in her quarters and using that DNA as a template to restore her to full health. The Enterprise then uses the same procedure to restore the station's staff, noting that the children will never be able to live with other humans, and then returns to the contaminated Lantree to destroy the ill-fated vessel.

== Production ==
Special Effects works was done by Image G. The USS Lantree shown in this episode was a redress of the USS Reliant model that was used for the 1982 feature film Star Trek II: The Wrath of Khan.

Hair styling was done by Richard Sabre.

== Reception ==
Zack Handlen of The A.V. Club gave it a grade B+. Keith R.A. DeCandido of Tor.com rated the episode 3 out of 10.

Den of Geek's James Hunt wrote: "There are bits of this which are interesting – the mystery of what caused the disease, the exploration of the character work between Picard and Pulaski" but was critical of the ending and recommended viewers skip the episode.

== See also ==
- "Space Seed" – first season episode of the original series
- "The Omega Glory" second season episode of the original series, in which a Federation starship is infected with a deadly virus
- "Doctor Bashir, I Presume?" – fifth season episode of Star Trek: Deep Space Nine, which mentions the Federation's long-standing prohibition against human genetic engineering
