= Dance of the Dead (The Prisoner) =

- The Prisoner episode
- Episode no.: Series 1 Episode 8
- Directed by: Don Chaffey
- Written by: Anthony Skene
- Production code: 4
- Original air date: 17 November 1967

Guest appearances
- Mary Morris; Duncan Macrae; Norma West

Episode chronology
← Previous "Many Happy Returns"	Next → "Checkmate"

"Dance of the Dead" is an episode of the allegorical British science fiction TV series The Prisoner. It was written by Anthony Skene and directed by Don Chaffey and fourth to be produced. It was the eighth episode to be broadcast in the UK, on ITV (ATV Midlands and Grampian) on Friday 17 November 1967, and first aired in the United States on CBS on Saturday 27 July 1968.

The episode stars Patrick McGoohan as Number Six and features Mary Morris as Number Two.

== Plot summary ==
The scientist Number Forty attempts to extract information from Number Six by having Number Six's former colleague Roland Walter Dutton (Number Forty-Two) call him while he is under a sort of electronic hypnosis. Number Six resists and is suspicious of what is happening; Number Two orders the plan to be abandoned.

Number Six wakes up with no memory of the previous night's actions. He makes the acquaintance of a black cat, which later turns out to be a spy for Number Two. Number Two suggests that he get a girlfriend; he tries talking to his Observer, Number 240. He learns that a mysterious Carnival is to be held in the Village.

That night he makes another escape attempt, but is blocked by Rover on the beach. He spends the night on the beach and, upon awakening, discovers a dead man's body washed ashore. On the man's person is a radio. When Number Six tries to reach a high point to listen to it, at first he gets only static and a muffled, seemingly foreign-language channel. Then suddenly there is a mysterious broadcast:

"Nowhere is there more beauty than here. Tonight, when the moon rises, the whole world will turn to silver. Do you understand? It is important that you understand.

"I have a message for you. You must listen. The appointment cannot be fulfilled. Other things must be done tonight. If our torment is to end, if liberty is to be restored, we must grasp the nettle, even though it makes our hands bleed. Only through pain can tomorrow be assured."

Later, Number Six puts a lifebuoy on the corpse and sends it out to sea with a note. Hiding in a cave, Number Six meets Dutton, who has been broken. Remembering his acquaintance with him, Number Six addresses him by name. Dutton says he has told his captors all he knows, but they believe he is withholding further secrets, and they will soon be employing harsher methods to extract the information from him.

The Carnival becomes a costumed ball and dance in which everyone has an elaborate identity except Number Six, who is simply given his own dinner jacket. He leaves the party to investigate and finds out that Dutton is to be executed. Later, he enters a morgue and finds that the body floated out to sea has been discovered, retrieved and brought there. Number Two explains that the corpse will be altered to resemble Number Six, so that the outside world will assume he has died at sea.

The soiree ends, however, in a kangaroo court with Number Six put on trial for the possession of the radio. After arguments for the prosecution (by Number 240) and defence (by Number Two), Number Six asks for Roland Walter Dutton to be called as a character witness. When Dutton is produced he is dressed in a jester's costume and is clearly a mindless simpleton. The trial ends with Number Six being sentenced to death. He then flees the place and is pursued through the corridors of the town hall by enraged Villagers, but manages to escape into a back room. There, he finds and damages a teletype machine that may be a communication between the village and Number One. Then Number Two appears and tells him: "they don't know you're already dead". Number Six swears that he will never give in to the Village. As the damaged teletype resumes operating, Number Two then laughs and wryly observes, "Then how very uncomfortable for you, old chap!"

== Cast ==
- Mary Morris as Number Two/Defender (Peter Pan)
- Duncan MacRae as Doctor/Judge (Napoleon)
- Norma West as Observer (Number 240)/Prosecutor (Little Bo Peep)
- Angelo Muscat as The Butler
- Aubrey Morris as Town crier/Chief Judge (Caesar)
- Bee Duffell as Psychiatrist
- Camilla Hasse as Day supervisor
- Alan White as Roland Walter Dutton (Number 42)/Jester
- Michael Nightingale as Night supervisor
- Patsy Smart as Night maid
- Denise Buckley as Maid/Judge (Elizabeth I)
- George Merritt as Postman
- John Frawley as Flower man
- Lucy Griffiths as Lady in corridor
- William Lyon Brown as Second Doctor
- Fenella Fielding as The Announcer/Telephone Operator (voice only)

== Broadcast ==
The broadcast date of the episode varied in different ITV regions of the UK. The episode was first shown at 7:30pm on Friday 17 November 1967 on ATV Midlands and Grampian Television and on Friday 24 November on Anglia Television.

On ATV London, whose broadcasts were also taken up by Southern Television, Westward Television and Tyne-Tees, the episode was broadcast on Sunday 26 November, two weeks after the previous episode "Many Happy Returns", displaced by the broadcast of the Royal Variety Performance on Sunday 19 November.

The episode was broadcast on Thursday 30 November on Scottish Television, having been delayed by a week by the belated broadcast of "A. B. and C." the previous week, which had been delayed from its planned broadcast on 19 October by a power-cut.

"Dance of the Dead" was shown on Thursday 7 December on Border Television, and on Friday 15 December on Granada Television in the North West. The aggregate viewing figures for the ITV regions that debuted the season in 1967 have been estimated at 9.1 million. In Northern Ireland the episode did not debut until Saturday 23 February 1968, and in Wales it was not broadcast until Wednesday 25 February 1970.

== Bibliography ==
- Fairclough, Robert, ed. (2004). The Prisoner: The Original Scripts. Vol. 1. foreword by Lewis Greifer. Reynolds & Hearn. ISBN 978-1-903111-76-5. OCLC 61145235. – script of episode
