= Georgina Cookson =

British actress (1918–2011)

- Born: 19 December 1918; Mevagissey, Cornwall, England
- Died: 1 October 2011 (aged 92); Sydney, Australia
- Other name: Antoinette Georgina Cookson
- Years active: 1945–1983

Antoinette Georgina Cookson (19 December 1918 – 1 October 2011) was a British film, stage and television actress. She died in Sydney, aged 92, on 1 October 2011.

== Family ==
Cookson was the daughter of racing driver Roger Cookson and Sybil Taylor. Her mother, using the pseudonym Sydney Tremayne, was a novelist and contributed to The Tatler. Cookson left Benenden School at the age of 15 to train at RADA. She was the great-granddaughter of the psychiatrist Sir James Crichton-Browne.

She was married four times; she was twice divorced and twice widowed. She had two children, a son and a daughter.

== Theatre ==
After graduating from RADA, she found constant work in both the regions and the West End theatre, appearing alongside Hermione Gingold in the wartime revue Rise Above It at the ‘Q’ (1940) and at the Comedy Theatre (1941). In the same decade, she was in Love Goes to Press, with Irene Worth, at the Embassy Theatre (in Swiss Cottage) and Duchess Theatre (1946) and briefly on Broadway the following year; School for Spinsters (Criterion Theatre, 1947), Portrait of Hickory (Embassy, 1948) and opposite Jack Buchanan in Don't Listen, Ladies! at the St James's Theatre in 1949.

She was no less busy in the 1950s, with appearances in Lionel Shapiro's The Bridge for Bristol Old Vic (1952); 13 for Dinner (Duke of York's Theatre, 1953); the world premiere of I Capture the Castle, with Virginia McKenna, Bill Travers and Roger Moore, which opened at Grand Theatre, Blackpool before transferring to the Aldwych Theatre in 1954; and Robert Morley’s Six Months’ Grace (Phoenix Theatre, 1957). Her last stage roles included a national tour of My Fair Lady in 1988 and, alongside Peggy Mount and Jack Douglas, Breath of Spring in 1990.

Cookson also worked in radio. A 1945 radio adaptation of the comic strip Jane, produced by the Overseas Recorded Broadcasting Service for British forces overseas, starred Cookson.

== Filmography ==
=== Film ===
| Year | Title | Role | Notes |
|---|---|---|---|
| 1945 | I Didn't Do It | Willow Thane | |
| 1948 | Woman Hater | Julia | |
| 1954 | Solution by Phone | Frances Hanborough | |
| 1957 | The Naked Truth | Lady Lucy Mayley | AKA, Your Past Is Showing |
| 1958 | A Question of Adultery | Mrs. Duncan | |
| 1959 | The Treasure of San Teresa | Billie | |
| 1959 | The Shakedown | Miss Firbank | |
| 1960 | Your Money or Your Wife | Thelma Cressingdon | |
| 1962 | Live Now – Pay Later | Lucy | |
| 1965 | Catacombs | Ellen Garth | AKA, The Woman Who Wouldn't Die |
| 1965 | Darling | Carlotta Hale | |
| 1969 | Walk a Crooked Path | Imogen Dreeper | |

=== Television ===
| Year | Title | Role | Notes |
|---|---|---|---|
| 1947 | Fortunato | Constanza Hidalgo | TV short |
| 1948 | The Dover Road | Eustasia | TV film |
| 1948 | The Happy Marriage | Prudence Naish | TV film |
| 1949 | Sarah Simple | Sarah | TV film |
| 1949 | By Candlelight | Lulu Keck | TV film |
| 1952 | Lovers' Leap | Sarah Traille | TV film |
| 1953 | It's You I Want | Constance Gilbert | TV film |
| 1954 | Saber of London | Muriel | "The Secret Place" |
| 1955 | The Water Gipsies | Fay Meadows | TV film |
| 1957 | Getting Married | Lesbia Grantham | TV film |
| 1957 | Theatre Night | Lorna Loveday | "Six Months' Grace" |
| 1957 | Educated Evans | Lady Brenda Herbans | "High Society" |
| 1958 | Sunday Night Theatre | Mme. Pouchelet | "The Three Daughters of M. Dupont" |
| 1958 | The Verdict Is Yours | Dr. Christine Helder | "The Case of the Offensive General" |
| 1958 | ITV Play of the Week | Lily | "The Curious Savage" |
| 1959 | ITV Play of the Week | Gwen Cedar | "For Services Rendered" |
| 1959 | All Aboard | Lady Gilbert | 30 May 1959 |
| 1960 | A Life of Bliss | Ursula Brooking | "Flying Fur" |
| 1960 | Emma | Mrs. Augusta Elton | TV miniseries |
| 1960 | On Trial | Mrs. Wilson | "The Baccarat Scandal" |
| 1960 | The Professor's Love Story | Lady Gilding | TV film |
| 1960 | ITV Play of the Week | Connie Mercer | "Ladies of the Corridor" |
| 1960 | Saturday Playhouse | Dorothy Ritchie | "The Difficult Age" |
| 1961 | Saturday Playhouse | Marjory Leland | "A Sense of Guilt" |
| 1961 | Danger Man | Miss Bishop | "The Trap" |
| 1961 | Dixon of Dock Green | Iris Lenton | "The Case of the Silent Thief" |
| 1961 | No Hiding Place | Edith Sudbury | "The Widower" |
| 1962 | ITV Television Playhouse | Mrs. Bindy | "A Free Weekend" |
| 1962 | Maigret | Mrs. Wilton | "The Amateurs" |
| 1962 | ITV Play of the Week | Ruth Stilton | "A Letter from the General" |
| 1963 | ITV Play of the Week | Edwina | "The Finambulists" |
| 1963 | No Hiding Place | Ellis Andrews | "Death on the Doorstep" |
| 1963 | Comedy Playhouse | Mrs. Ferris | "Impasse" |
| 1963 | Jezebel ex UK | Celia Brooks | "Love and Let Love" |
| 1964 | The Planemakers | Laura | "Sauce for the Goose" |
| 1964 | Espionage | Eve McAvoy | "A Tiny Drop of Poison" |
| 1964 | The Indian Tales of Rudyard Kipling | Mrs. Mallowe | TV series |
| 1965 | Summer Comedy Hour | Mrs. Brent | "Almost a Honeymoon" |
| 1965 | ITV Play of the Week | Melanie | "Finesse in Diamonds" |
| 1966 | ITV Play of the Week | Mabel Crosswaite | "The Reluctant Debutante" |
| 1966 | Eugenie Grandet | Marquise d'Aubrion | "Inheritance" |
| 1967 | Sorry I'm Single | Miss Kaye | "The Polka Dot Matching Set" |
| 1967 | Sanctuary | Mrs. Courtney | "Has Everyone Heard of Juliet?" |
| 1967 | The Prisoner | Blonde Lady | "A. B. and C." |
| 1967 | The Prisoner | Mrs. Butterworth | "Many Happy Returns" |
| 1968 | Ooh La La! | Madame de Pontmele | "The Hasty Hand" |
| 1968 | Harry Worth | Lady Pressley | "Last in Line" |
| 1969 | Harry Worth | Vera Filbert | "Anyone for Golf?" |
| 1969 | Her Majesty's Pleasure | Lady Droylesden | "The Woman's Touch" |
| 1970 | W. Somerset Maugham | Marion Towers | "Jane" |
| 1971 | UFO | Jane Grant | "Court Martial" |
| 1972 | Steptoe and Son | Mrs. Kennington-Stroud | "Loathe Story" |
| 1972 | Clouds of Witness | Helen, Duchess of Denver | TV miniseries |
| 1975 | Affairs of the Heart | Maud Lowder | "Milly" |
| 1978 | Do You Remember? | Mrs. Harlow | "The File on Harry Jordan" |
| 1983 | Number 10 | Baroness Rothschild | "Dizzy" |
