= Suzie Plakson =

American actress

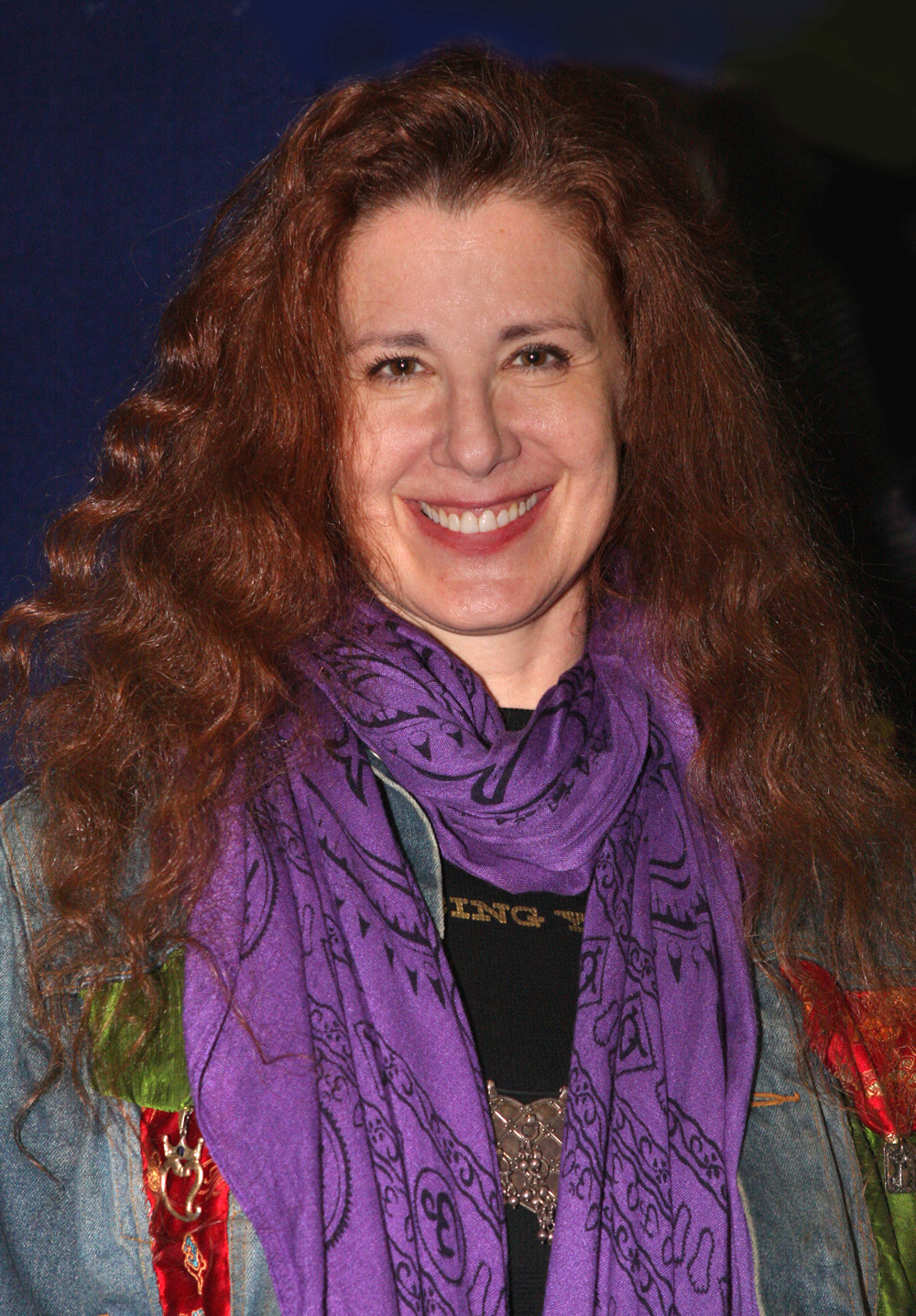
- Plakson in 2012
- Born: Susan Plakson; June 3, 1958 (age 68); Buffalo, New York, U.S.
- Education: Northwestern University
- Occupation: Actress
- Years active: 1987–present
- Known for: Love & War; Star Trek (various roles); Mad About You; How I Met Your Mother
- Website: suzieplakson.com

Susan Plakson (born June 3, 1958) is an American actress, singer, and writer.

== Early life ==
Plakson was born in Buffalo, New York, grew up in Kingston, Pennsylvania, and went to college at Northwestern University.

== Career ==
Plakson began her career on the stage, and played four characters opposite Anthony Newley in the national revival tour of Stop the World, I Want to Get Off. She also played Marquise Theresa Du Parc in the Broadway production of La Bête.

Plakson was a regular in the sitcom Love & War, as sportswriter Mary Margaret "Meg" Tynan. She played four characters on various Star Trek series: a Vulcan, Doctor Selar, in "The Schizoid Man" (Star Trek: The Next Generation); half-Klingon, half-human Ambassador K'Ehleyr in "The Emissary" (Star Trek: The Next Generation) and "Reunion" (Star Trek: The Next Generation); the Lady Q in "The Q and the Grey" (Star Trek: Voyager); and an Andorian, Tarah, in "Cease Fire" (Star Trek: Enterprise).

Suzie Plakson in 2005

Plakson played the blue brontosaurus real estate agent Monica de Vertebrae on Dinosaurs, as well as many other guest voices. She has had recurring roles in various sitcoms such as Mad About You, Everybody Loves Raymond and How I Met Your Mother. She has appeared in movies such as Disclosure, Red Eye and Wag the Dog.

Plakson wrote and performed an allegorical solo show, An Evening with Eve. Plakson penned and performed the alternative country rock album DidnWannaDoIt! produced by Jay Ferguson, and released the video of the title song on YouTube. She wrote and recorded the audiobook/e-book, The Return of King Lillian, a mythic allegory. She has written short stories and poetry.

== Filmography ==
=== Film ===
Year	Title	Role	Notes
1988	My Stepmother Is an Alien	Tenley	
1991	Bingo	Ginger	
1994	Disclosure	Mary Anne Hunter	
1997	Wag the Dog	Grace	
2001	On Edge	Janet Bellamy	
2005	Red Eye	Senior Flight Attendant	

=== Television ===
Year	Title	Role	Notes
1987	CBS Summer Playhouse	Yolanda	1 episode: "Reno and Yolanda"
1987	Family Ties	Doris	1 episode: "Super Mom"
1988	Eisenhower and Lutz	Sheri Blankenship	1 episode: "Blast from the Past"
1988	Annie McGuire	Mrs. Cipriani	1 episode: "The Fried Shoe"
1989	Murphy Brown	Jackie	1 episode: "I Would Have Danced All Night"
1989	Married to the Mob	Connie Russo	Television film
1989	White Lies	Phyllis	Television film
1989–1990	Star Trek: The Next Generation	K'Ehleyr / Lt. Selar, M.D.	3 episodes: "The Emissary", "Reunion", and "The Schizoid Man"
1990	Beauty and the Beast	Susan	1 episode: "In the Forests of the Night"
1991	The Torkelsons	Verna	1 episode: "Poetry in Motion"
1991–94	Dinosaurs	Monica Devertebrae / Elder #3 / Sally (voices)	14 episodes
1992–95	Love & War	Mary Margaret 'Meg' Tynan	67 episodes
1995	Double Rush	Meg Tynan	1 episode: "Comings and Goings"
1996	Star Trek: Voyager	Female Q	1 episode: "The Q and the Grey"
1996–99	Mad About You	Dr. Joan Golfinos	18 episodes
1997	Johnny Bravo	Vivian Vixen (voice)	1 episode: "Under the Big Flop"
1998	Men in Black: The Series	Edie	1 episode: "The Sonic Boom Syndrome"
1999	Family Guy	Ann Romano Character / Various (voices)	2 episodes: "A Hero Sits Next Door", "The Son Also Draws"
2000	Everybody Loves Raymond	Joanne "Cinnamon" Glotz	2 episodes: "Robert's Divorce", "Meant to Be"
2000	Bette	Dr. Bauer	1 episode: "Silent But Deadly"
2000	Judging Amy	Jane Holcombe	1 episode: "Dog Days"
2001	Futurama	Amazonian (voice)	1 episode: "Amazon Women in the Mood"
2002	The Education of Max Bickford	Dr. Ingrid Chekhov	1 episode: "The Egg and I"
2003	Star Trek: Enterprise	Tarah	1 episode: "Cease Fire"
2005–14	How I Met Your Mother	Judy Eriksen	15 episodes
2009	Eli Stone	Jesse Bates	2 episodes: "Mortal Combat", "Sonoma"
2011	Bones	Rosalind Bassa	1 episode: "The Finder"

=== Video games ===
Year	Title	Role	Notes
2000	Code Blue	Chief of Staff Nan Fleming	
2001	Emergency Room 3	Chief of Staff Nan Fleming	
