= Rachel Herbert =

British actress (1935–2025)

- Born: Rachel Nicola Herbert; 5 January 1935
- Died: 7 March 2025 (aged 90)
- Occupation: Actress

Rachel Nicola Herbert (5 January 1935 – 7 March 2025) was a British actress whose television appearances included roles in Deadline Midnight (1960), Thursday Theatre (1964), The Villains (1964), No Hiding Place (1963–65), Danger Man (1965), The Power Game (1965–66), and Thirty-Minute Theatre (1967). She appeared in The Prisoner episode entitled "Free for All" (1967) as Number Fifty-Eight but ultimately revealed to be the new Number Two.

Other roles include ITV Play of the Week (1965–67), Man in a Suitcase (1968), Spindoe (1968), The Champions (1969), Callan (1970), Special Branch (1970), ITV Saturday Night Theatre (1971); episode 1 of Lord Peter Wimsey 's Clouds of Witness, Murder Must Advertise (1973), The Pallisers (1974), The Venturers (1975), Softly, Softly: Taskforce (1974–75), Shadows (1978), The Professionals (1978), Prince Regent (1979), The Enigma Files (1980), Minder (1980), Crown Court (1973–84), Screen Two (1986), and The House of Eliott (1994).

Herbert's film appearances include Robbery (1967), The Raging Moon (1971) and The Doctor and the Devils (1985).

Herbert died on 7 March 2025, at the age of 90.
