= Ed Straker =

- UFO character
- Straker in the episode "A Question of Priorities"
- First appearance: "Identified"; 14 September 1970
- Last appearance: "Timelash"; 17 February 1971
- Created by: Gerry & Sylvia Anderson
- Portrayed by: Ed Bishop

In-universe information
- Title: Colonel
- Occupation: SHADO commander-in-chief; Air force officer; Astronaut; Chief executive of Harlington‑Straker Film Studios (cover)
- Affiliation: SHADO; United States Air Force
- Family: Mary Rutland (ex-wife); John (son)
- Reports to: General James L. Henderson, International Astrophysical Commission

Colonel Edward Straker, United States Air Force, Commander-in-Chief of SHADO, is the main character in the British science fiction television series UFO. In the series, he is one of the founders of Project Angel, a military intelligence programme founded to combat visiting UFOs carrying hostile aliens. This leads to the creation of Supreme Headquarters Alien Defence Organisation (SHADO). Publicly, Straker is the chief executive of Harlington-Straker, a British film studio serving as a front for SHADO. The character was played by Ed Bishop.

== Development ==
Bishop described the character as "a guy whose world was composed of black and white. There were very few greys in his life, and this is why he was very good at his job, because you had to make instant decisions." He based his portrayal of Straker's commitment to SHADO on the discipline of an American missile combat crew he had seen in a TV documentary.

In the early stages of production, Straker's whitish-blond hair was created by dying Bishop's naturally darker hair. After the actor became uncomfortable with the repeated re-dyeings, a number of blond wigs were made for him to wear instead.

== Fictional biography ==
Straker's backstory is presented in the episodes "Identified" and "Confetti Check A-O.K." Before the events of the series, he is promoted to Colonel in the United States Air Force. He meets General James Henderson and Royal Air Force pilot Alec Freeman, becoming good friends with the latter.

In the early 1970s, Henderson introduces Straker to Project Angel: a secret defence programme to fight hostile UFOs piloted by a race of humanoid extraterrestrials. The project is a collaboration between the United States, the Soviet Union, France and an unidentified side of Germany. After arriving in England to secure the British government's backing, Straker and Henderson's motorcade is attacked by a UFO, seriously injuring Henderson. Around this time, Straker marries a British woman, Mary, who never learns the truth about her husband's work.

As the major contributor to Project Angel, the US insists that an American lead the programme. Straker nominates Henderson for the role, but the general is still in recovery, and Straker is appointed instead.

Forced to work long days, Straker spends little time at home with Mary, who is now pregnant and increasingly unhappy with their marriage. Suspecting that Straker is having an extramarital affair, Mary's mother has him followed by a private detective. Mary and her mother's worst fears are confirmed when Straker is photographed driving Project Angel recruit Nina Barry to an unidentified residence. (In fact, Straker and Barry are attending a meeting of Project Angel staff.) Mary decides to leave Straker and they have a blazing argument, during which Mary falls down the stairs at their house. She survives, but prematurely gives birth to their son, John. Straker and Mary divorce, and Mary is given sole custody of the child. She later marries a man called Rutland.

Project Angel culminates in the formation of SHADO (Supreme Headquarters Alien Defence Organisation), controlled from a bunker built beneath Harlington-Straker Film Studios. Straker runs the studios as a front for the organisation. Although he commands SHADO, Straker remains answerable to Henderson, the leader of SHADO's parent organisation the International Astrophysical Commission.

In the first episode, set in 1980, SHADO is fully operational with Straker as commander-in-chief and now-Colonel Freeman as his number two. A UFO is shot down and its dying alien occupant is brought to SHADO HQ. Examination of the alien's corpse reveals transplanted human organs. This proves a theory that the aliens are a highly advanced but declining race dependent on harvested human body parts for survival.

In "Exposed", Straker recruits air force test pilot Paul Foster to SHADO after Foster strays upon the organisation's secrets. Although he gives Foster a senior position with the rank of colonel, Straker maintains a strictly formal relationship with him, and later transfers him to SHADO's Moonbase.

In "A Question of Priorities", Straker and Mary's son John is badly hurt when he is run down by a car outside the Rutland house. He is taken to hospital, but due to an allergy, cannot be treated with conventional drugs. His only chance for survival is a special drug made in the United States. Straker has a SHADO aircraft bring a supply to England, but Freeman, unaware of the situation, diverts the plane as part of an operation to apprehend an alien defector. John dies before the drug reaches the hospital. Mary will not forgive Straker and tells him that she never wants to see him again.

== Reception ==
According to Den of Geek, Bishop's casting gave UFO "a credible and commanding lead". It also comments that the role "seemed to constantly require Bishop to be in a rage" and that for this reason, the actor particularly enjoyed working on the series' lighter-hearted episodes. For Paul Mount of Starburst magazine, Straker is the series' only regular character who undergoes significant development. Mount describes him as a "cold, distant and hard-edged loner who seems more machine than man". According to Fred McNamara, Bishop's "smouldering" performance as the "relentless yet weary" Straker is an "indisputable high point" of the series.

Calling Straker a "flawed" hero, John Kenneth Muir notes that "unlike past and future Star Trek captains, Straker is not a philosophy-spouting idealist. Nor is he an audacious strategist or rugged womaniser. Instead, he is a beaten, lonely man, obsessed with preserving the planet from the exploitative aliens." He also states that Straker's characterisation was one of the elements of the series "that [make it] so memorable". Describing Straker as "one of the most unusual lead characters in television history", John A. Barnes of National Review writes that he "was no Captain James T. Kirk, a heroic figure who managed to answer all the audience's questions and tie up all the loose ends with a witty quip before the final credits [...] To Straker, individuals mean nothing. All that matters is stopping the aliens."

According to Gizmodo's Alasdair Wilkins, although Straker's "cold, calculating character made him an unlikely hero, [...] it also provided the show with much of its dramatic heft, as his single-minded pursuit of the enemy left him ever more isolated from his friends and family." Writing for SciFiNow, Chris Chantler comments that Straker "makes UFO feel like a serious, mature and even profound show. His blend of ruthlessness and vulnerability is the prime reason that it remains so compelling."

Yoshiyuki Sadamoto, an artist and character designer for both the manga and anime of Neon Genesis Evangelion, based the appearance and demeanor of the character Gendo Ikari on Straker.
