= Mr. Doctor =

- Also known as: The Man of a Thousand Voices
- Born: Mario Panciera
- Origin: Italy
- Occupations: Singer, musician, composer
- Instruments: Vocals, organ, celesta, accordion
- Years active: 1987–present
- Label: Hurdy Gurdy

Mr. Doctor (Mario Panciera) is an Italian singer, musician and composer. He is the leader of the rock band Devil Doll.

For 20 years, from forming the band in 1987, he kept his identity a secret – revealing little more than that he was born in Slovenia, of Italian extraction, and lived in Venice. After 1992, when he was heavily censored in the introduction of a television showing of Sacrilegium, he long refused to give interviews. His legal name, Mario Panciera, was only made public with the 2007 release of his book 45 Revolutions (A definitive discography of UK punk, mod, powerpop, new wave, NWOBHM, and indie singles 1976–1979, Volume I).

== Discography ==
- The Mark of the Beast (1988) (only one copy exists)
- The Girl Who Was... Death (1989)
- Eliogabalus (1990)
- Sacrilegium (1992)
- The Sacrilege of Fatal Arms (1993)
- Dies Irae (1996)

== Bibliography ==
- 45 Revolutions (A definitive discography of UK punk, mod, powerpop, new wave, NWOBHM, and indie singles 1976–1979, Volume I). Hurdy Gurdy Books, Italy (2007)

== Quotes ==
"A man is less likely to become great the more he is dominated by reason: few can achieve greatness – and none in art – if they are not dominated by illusion."
– Heading of the advertisement by Mr. Doctor to recruit members for the original lineup of Devil Doll.

"This is a painting, not a graphic work."
– Mr. Doctor, in response to why only one copy of The Mark of the Beast was pressed.
