= Free for All (The Prisoner) =

- The Prisoner episode
- Episode no.: Series 1 Episode 4
- Directed by: Patrick McGoohan
- Written by: Patrick McGoohan (credited as Paddy Fitz)
- Cinematography by: Brendan J. Stafford
- Production code: 2
- Original air date: 20 October 1967

Guest appearances
- Eric Portman; Rachel Herbert

Episode chronology
← Previous "A. B. and C."	Next → "The Schizoid Man"

"Free for All" is an episode of the allegorical British science fiction TV series The Prisoner. It was written and directed by Patrick McGoohan (though he used the pseudonym "Paddy Fitz" for the writer credit) and the second episode to be produced. It was the fourth episode to be broadcast in the UK on ITV (ATV Midlands and Grampian) on Friday 20 October 1967 and first aired in the United States on CBS on Saturday 29 June 1968.

The episode stars Patrick McGoohan as Number Six and features Eric Portman as Number Two . The central theme of the episode is corruption and fraud in elections.

== Plot summary ==
Number Six is persuaded to run for election to the post of Number Two when it is suggested to him by the new incumbent that, should he win, he will finally meet Number One. Number Fifty-Eight, a newly arrived young woman who speaks only an unidentified Slavic-sounding foreign language (really "a meaningless linguistic pastiche specially invented by the scriptwriters") is assigned to Number Six as his assistant, which she enthusiastically embraces, although he does not. Both men campaign for the office, with Number Six subversively offering freedom to the Village masses if he is elected. Number Six participates ambivalently, but abruptly makes a break for freedom himself in the midst of the campaign by escaping in a motorboat. He is retrieved on the water by Rover while he robotically mouths campaign platitudes.

Number Six and Number Two drink and commiserate in a cave where illegal liquor is distilled and Number Two states that he detests The Village. Number Six is again repeatedly drugged and coerced into accepting the campaign, and wins the election when virtually all the robotic "citizens" vote for him. As he and Number Fifty-Eight go to the Green Dome to take command of the Village, she agitates him by playing with the buttons on the control panel before brutally slapping him around several times with surprising strength, then stunning him with bright lighting. As Number Six becomes somewhat more lucid and attempts to broadcast to the Villagers that they are free to go, he is beaten by a group of mechanics in coveralls, and Number Fifty-Eight, now speaking perfect English, reveals herself as the real incoming Number Two, while the previous Number Two prepares to head out. She asks her departing predecessor to give her "regards to the homeland".

== Cast ==
- Eric Portman as Incumbent Number Two
- Rachel Herbert as Number Fifty-Eight / Incoming Number Two
- George Benson as Labour Exchange manager
- Harold Berens as Reporter
- John Cazabon as Man in cave
- Dene Cooper as Photographer
- Kenneth Benda as Supervisor
- Holly Doone as Waitress
- Peter Brace as 1st Mechanic
- Alf Joint as 2nd Mechanic
- Fenella Fielding as The Announcer/Telephone Operator (voice only)

== Broadcast ==
The broadcast date of the episode varied in different ITV regions of the UK. The episode was first shown at 7:30pm on Friday 20 October 1967 on ATV Midlands and Grampian Television, on Sunday 22 October on ATV London, Southern Television, Westward Television and Tyne-Tees; on Thursday 26 October on Scottish Television, on Friday 27 October on Anglia Television, on Thursday 9 November on Border Television and on Friday 17 November on Granada Television in the North West. The aggregate viewing figures for the ITV regions that debuted the season in 1967 have been estimated at 11.1 million. In Northern Ireland, the episode did not debut until Saturday 27 January 1968, and in Wales, the episode was not broadcast until Wednesday 28 January 1970.

In the United States, the episode aired on the CBS Television Network at 7:30 pm EDT on June 29, 1968.

== Sources ==
- Fairclough, Robert, ed. (2004). The Prisoner: The Original Scripts. Vol. 1. foreword by Lewis Greifer. Reynolds & Hearn. ISBN 978-1-903111-76-5. OCLC 61145235. – script of episode
