= Dies Irae (Devil Doll album) =

Studio album by Devil Doll
- Released: February 1996
- Recorded: September 1994 – September 1995 at Akademik Studios and various locations
- Genre: Progressive rock
- Length: 75:40; 52:20 (w/o silence)
- Label: Hurdy Gurdy Records
- Producer: Mr. Doctor with Jurij Toni

Devil Doll chronology
The Sacrilege of Fatal Arms (1993)	Dies Irae (1996)

Dies Irae is the fourth and final studio album by Italian-Slovenian rock band Devil Doll, released in February 1996.

A concept by Mr. Doctor, it is inspired by the life and music of George Harvey Bone, the poems of Edgar Allan Poe, Emily Brontë, Emily Dickinson and Isidore Ducasse.

The lyrics contains multiple references to the poem "The Conqueror Worm" by E. A. Poe (with the entire final stanza of the poem reproduced almost verbatim). The sample used at the beginning "Part 12" is from the film The Night of the Hunter, and is the character Pearl Harper (played by Sally Jane Bruce) singing.

== Track listing ==
No.	Title	Length
1.	"Dies Irae": I. "Part 1" (2:44); II. "Part 2" (2:21); III. "Part 3" (2:54); IV. "Part 4" (3:07); V. "Part 5" (2:06); VI. "Part 6" (3:45); VI. "Part 7" (3:37); VIII. "Part 8" (4:14); IX. "Part 9" (3:08); X. "Part 10" (5:23); XI. "Part 11" (3:10); XII. "Part 12" (1:10); XIII. "Part 13" (1:19); XIV. "Part 14" (2:36); XV. "Part 15" (1:24); XVI "Part 16" (2:53); XVII. "Part 17" (1:23); XVIII. "Part 18" (28:27)"	75:40
Total length:		75:40

"Part 18" ends at 2:52 and is followed by 23:20 of silence. A hidden track then starts playing. This song is sometimes called "Part 19".

== Personnel ==
=== Line up ===
- Mr. Doctor – vocals, producer, cover concept, music, lyrics
- Francesco Carta – piano, music
- Sasha Olenjuk – violin
- Roman Ratej – drums
- Bor Zuljan – guitar
- Janez Hace – bass
- Davor Klarič – keyboards
- Michel Fantini Jesurum – pipe organ

=== Guests ===
- Norina Radovan – soprano vocals
- Drago Ivanuša – accordion
- Paolo Zizich – backing vocals
- The "Gloria Chorus" conducted by Marjan Bunič
- Slovenian philharmonic orchestra soloist:
  - Igor Škerjanec – cello
  - Irina Kevorkova – violin
  - Fraim Gashi – double bass

=== Production ===
- Jurij Toni – producer, engineering
- Rossana Pistolato – artwork
- Andrea Buffolo – artwork, photography
- Sergio Sutto – photography
- Giampaolo Fallani – films
- Ermanno Velludo – pipe organ recording
