= The Girl Who Was... Death =

The Girl Who Was ... Death

Studio album by Devil Doll
- Released: 4 March 1989
- Recorded: September 1988 at Tivoli Studios in Ljubljana, Yugoslavia (now Slovenia)
- Genre: Progressive rock
- Length: 66:06
- Label: Hurdy Gurdy
- Producer: Mr. Doctor

Devil Doll chronology
The Mark of the Beast (1988)	The Girl Who Was ... Death (1989)	Eliogabalus (1990)

The Girl Who Was ... Death is the second album and first released by Italian-Slovenian rock band Devil Doll. Its official release date was 4 March 1989, but there was a pre-release of cassette tapes in December 1988. This was the second album by Devil Doll, but their first to be released to the public (the group's first release, The Mark of the Beast, had only one copy pressed, which was owned by the leading band member, Mr. Doctor).

== Background ==
The album was entirely written by Mr. Doctor and is based on the television series The Prisoner by Patrick McGoohan. The first edition of the album was pressed into 500 copies, but only 150 would survive Mr. Doctor's strange artistic vision. The 150 copies were handed out after a live performance of the album and the remaining 350 LPs were burned by Mr. Doctor after the show. In each album handed out was a unique inlay written by Mr. Doctor personally. The album was released under several different editions throughout the years—most notably by the band's official fan club, now the only source from which to obtain any of the band's material.

== Music style ==
Like all but two Devil Doll albums, The Girl Who Was ... Death contains only one track: the title track (another album has one musical track that is split into separate CD tracks). Being at an easily referenced length of 66 minutes and 6 seconds long, the song goes through many different themes and melodies, keeping strong to the band's progressive attributes. The album travels through several emotions with eerie tones and metaphorical lyrics. At 38:46 into the song, the music ceases and silence continues until the very end, where the album features the band's cover of the main theme from the television series that it is based on, The Prisoner. There are also some variations of this arrangement on other editions of the album, occurring during the 20-minute silence and outro.

Devil Doll continued to release several more albums in the styling of The Girl Who Was ... Death throughout the 1990s.

== Track listing ==
No.	Title	Length
1.	"The Girl Who Was … Death": I. "The Girl Who Was … Death" (38:46); II. Silence (25:25); III. "The Prisoner" (1:55)"	66:06
Total length:		66:06

The song ends at 38 minutes 46 seconds. After 25 minutes and 25 seconds of silence, a hidden track titled "The Prisoner" begins.

== Personnel ==
=== Line up ===
- Mr. Doctor – vocals, organ, keyboards, songwriting, producer, cover concept, lettering
- Edoardo Beato – piano
- Albert Dorigo – guitars
- Katia Giubbilei – violin
- Rob Dani – drums, percussion
- Bor Zuljan – guitars
- Davor Klarič – keyboards, piano
- Janez Hace – bass
- Lučko Kodermac – drums
- Saša Olenjuk – violin

=== Guests ===
- Jurij Toni – tuba, engineering
- Paolo Zizich – backing vocals
- Mojca Zlobko – harp
- Marjan Bunič – choir conductor, choir vocals
- Devil Chorus – choir
