= The Schizoid Man (Star Trek: The Next Generation) =

- Star Trek: The Next Generation episode
- Episode no.: Season 2 Episode 6
- Directed by: Les Landau
- Story by: Richard Manning; Hans Beimler
- Teleplay by: Tracy Tormé
- Cinematography by: Edward R. Brown
- Production code: 131
- Original air date: January 23, 1989

Guest appearances
- W. Morgan Sheppard – Ira Graves; Suzie Plakson – Dr. Selar; Barbara Alyn Woods – Kareen Brianon

Episode chronology
← Previous "Loud as a Whisper"	Next → "Unnatural Selection"
- Star Trek: The Next Generation season 2

"The Schizoid Man" is the sixth episode of the second season of the American science fiction television series Star Trek: The Next Generation, the 32nd episode overall first airing on January 23, 1989. The teleplay was written by Tracy Torme based on a story by Richard Manning and Hans Beimler, and directed by Les Landau.

Set in the 24th century, the series follows the adventures of the Starfleet crew of the Federation starship Enterprise-D. In this episode, a dying scientist, Dr. Ira Graves, attempts to cheat death by transferring his memories and personality into a machine, specifically Lieutenant Commander Data, an android and officer of the Enterprise.

== Plot ==
The Federation starship Enterprise, under the command of Captain Jean-Luc Picard, is en route to provide medical care for the reclusive but respected scientist Dr. Ira Graves, who lives with only his assistant, Kareen Brianon, on a remote planet. When the crew receives an emergency distress call from a nearby transport ship, Captain Picard elects to send an away team composed of Data, Counselor Troi, Lt. Worf, and Dr. Selar to see to Dr. Graves while Chief Medical Officer Dr. Pulaski stays aboard the Enterprise, which leaves to attend to the transport.

The away team finds that the request for medical assistance was made by Kareen without Graves' knowledge, and though resentful, he allows Selar to examine him. Selar determines that Graves has Darnay's disease, an incurable terminal disease and has only three weeks to live, so the team begins to collect Graves' research and records to preserve them after his death. Graves recognizes Data as Noonien Soong's creation and claims that he taught Soong everything he knew and asserts that if Soong is considered Data's "father", that would make Graves his "grandfather". Graves and Data begin to spend time alone, during which Graves reveals that he has developed a method to transfer his consciousness to a computer, allowing him to live indefinitely. Data in turn reveals that he has an off switch, which he says could be used to precipitate a version of death.

Later, Data reports to the away team that Graves has died. The Enterprise returns and retrieves the away team along with Kareen and Graves' body; Graves is given a funeral. Data delivers a glowing eulogy, surprising the crew. When he later whistles "If I Only Had a Brain", echoing a habit of Graves' (who had told Data he resembled the Tin Woodman), when entering a turbolift, Picard decides that his uncharacteristic behavior warrants an examination. Although no physical anomalies are detected, Troi's psychotronic stability tests suggest there are two personalities within Data: his original personality, and an additional personality that is foreign and dominant, and which threatens to replace Data's personality. Picard soon realizes that Graves has transferred his mind into Data.

Graves, still in Data's body, reveals the truth to Kareen. While passionately proposing that she do the same so they can spend eternity together, Graves accidentally breaks two bones in her hand due to Data's superhuman strength. Picard tries to persuade Graves to give up Data's body voluntarily, noting the harm he is causing to those he loves. Graves knocks the captain unconscious. When Picard awakens, he and a security team find Data in his quarters. Data is back to his old self and Kareen finds that Graves has transferred himself out of Data and into the Enterprise's computer but only his knowledge, not his consciousness; the "human" part of Dr. Graves has been lost.

== Reception ==
In 2011, Tor.com rated this episode 8 out of 10 and praised the acting performance of Morgan Sheppard and Brent Spiner, as they depict the scientist's personality. The A.V. Club gave the episode a grade C−. Den of Geek praised Spiner for his performance, and says the episode starts well "but in the last twenty minutes it runs out of ideas and turns awful."

In 2012, Wired characterized this episode as one of the worst of the Star Trek: The Next Generation television series. They suggest that the episode was inspired by an episode of The Prisoner, prompting an unsuccessful attempt to cast Patrick McGoohan (who would receive his second Primetime Emmy Award for Outstanding Guest Actor in a Drama Series the following year for an appearance on the revived Columbo) as Graves.

== See also ==
- Transhumanism
- The Schizoid Man (The Prisoner)
