= Devil Doll (Slovenian band) =

Slovenian-Italian experimental rock band

- Origin: Venice, Italy; Ljubljana, Slovenia
- Genres: Progressive rock; art rock
- Years active: 1987–1996
- Labels: Hurdy Gurdy; Jugoton
- Past members: Last known lineup: Mr. Doctor; Francesco Carta; Bor Zuljan; Jani Hace; Roman Ratej; Davor Klarič; Michel Fantini Jesurum

Devil Doll is an Italian-Slovenian rock band formed in 1987 by the mysterious "Mr. Doctor". Fronted by Mr. Doctor, they took influences from classical and Slavic folk music, and gained a cult following. The band makes lengthy songs, all over 20 minutes. They have not been musically active since 1996, when they released their last album, Dies Irae.

== History ==
=== Formation and The Mark of the Beast (1987) ===
Mr. Doctor recruits the members of Devil Doll through an advertisement with the heading:

"A man is the less likely to become great the more he is dominated by reason: few can achieve greatness – and none in art – if they are not dominated by illusion."

Originally, two lineups were formed, one in Venice, Italy, and one in Ljubljana, Yugoslavia.

The first work of Devil Doll was The Mark of the Beast, recorded in Tivoli Studios, Ljubljana in the last half of 1987. Amongst the sound technicians were Jurij Toni (most known for working with Laibach), who would work with the band for the next ten years. The Mark of the Beast was finished, and a single copy pressed, in February 1988. The cover to the album was painted by Mr. Doctor, who keeps the album in his home to this day. No other copies exist: "This is a painting, not a graphic work". A few passages from the album, however, are said to make "cameos" in future Devil Doll albums.

=== The Girl Who Was... Death and Eliogabalus (1987–1991) ===
Later the same year, work on a second composition began. This work, entitled The Girl Who Was... Death, was inspired by the 1967 British television series The Prisoner. 500 copies of the album were originally pressed, in the beginning of 1989, of which only 150 were released. These were distributed amongst the audience of the second live performance of the composition (the first had occurred before the pressing of the album), each with a unique inlay created by Mr. Doctor. Some of these inlays were written in his own blood. Mr. Doctor destroyed the remaining 350 copies of the album once he returned home.

In 1989, Mr. Doctor began the work on three different compositions: The Black Holes of My Mind, a composition incorporating esoteric quotations and subliminal messages; Mr. Doctor Sings Hanns Eisler, an interpretation of four of German composer Hanns Eisler's works; and Eliogabalus, inspired by Antonin Artaud's work Heliogabalus: Or, The Crowned Anarchist. Mr. Doctor Sings Hanns Eisler was never released, and the two former compositions were, due to budget limitations, cut down to fit on a single vinyl, named Eliogabalus. The shortened version of The Black Holes of My Mind was renamed Mr. Doctor for this release, while Eliogabalus retained its name. Eliogabalus was released in 1990, in three different pressings, one of 50 and two of 900 copies. One of the pressings of 900 was on CD.

=== Sacrilegium and The Sacrilege of Fatal Arms (1991–1993) ===
In 1991, the two lineups of Devil Doll were combined into one, and in December, the combined lineup, with the new pianist Francesco Carta, entered Tivoli Studios to record Sacrilegium.

Sacrilegium was released in May 1992. It was released only on CD, but the Devil Doll fan club released 900 numbered vinyl copies with inlays designed by Mr. Doctor and Adriana Marac.

In January the next year, a soundtrack to a movie by Mr. Doctor, The Sacrilege of Fatal Arms, was released. The 900 copies sold out in 72 hours. In March, drummer Roberto Dani left the band and was replaced by Slovenian Roman Ratej.

=== Dies Irae (1993–1996) ===
In July 1993, Devil Doll entered Tivoli Studios for recording of The Day of Wrath – Dies Irae. During a mixing session, the studio caught fire. Both Jurij Toni and Mr. Doctor escaped, although Toni ended up hospitalised for several days. Mr. Doctor refused to re-record the album, and rumours of a split-up began circulating. 20 copies of a book containing the sheet music for The Day of Wrath – Dies Irae, as well as a tape of the unmixed recording, was released, though.

At the end of 1994, Mr. Doctor finally agreed to re-record Dies Irae. The recording started in January 1995 in Akademik Studios. Devil Doll was backed by the Slovenian Philharmonic Orchestra, of which band member Sasha Olenjuk was the leader and first violinist. Later, Norina Radovan, a Croatian soprano, was recruited to sing a duet with Mr. Doctor on the album. The recording was released in February 1996 and is the only composition to consist of multiple tracks. (Eliogabalus consists of two tracks, but these are two different compositions supposed to have been released on two different albums.)

=== Release hiatus (1996–) ===
The last album, The Day of Wrath, soundtrack to the second of Mr. Doctor's movies, of the same name, was scheduled for release in 1997 but was never released.

While Devil Doll has never been officially disbanded, nothing has been released since Dies Irae. In 2004, a mailing action was started by a fan and the Fan Club to make Mr. Doctor and Devil Doll produce more material. The letters were printed in a book named A Thousand Letters to Mr. Doctor. Mr. Doctor replied to the effort in 2005, and sent the fan who started the mailing action a gift of appreciation: Mr. Doctor's personal copy (number 1) of Sacrilegium, handmade and written in a leather box and accompanied by a handmade, signed artwork with the word "Astonished" on it.

In 2007, Mr. Doctor released a book called 45 Revolutions, under Hurdy Gurdy Books, another arm of the fan club label Hurdy Gurdy, which revealed his real name to be Mario Panciera. The book's strapline is "45 Revolutions is the definitive book on punk, mod, powerpop, new wave, NWOBHM, and indie singles issued in the UK and in Ireland between late 1976 and the end of 1979. Twenty years in the making. 1173 pages. 4550 color photos. 2885 b&w photos. Details of more than 3000 singles by over 2000 artists. Available only as a superior quality hardback."

In late 2008, Mr. Doctor gave an interview to Burn magazine, explaining the history of the five Devil Doll releases on the back of a re-release (and remaster) on the Japanese label Belle Antique. He revealed that he continues to write and record Devil Doll music, though he has lost interest in releasing records. He also talks about his inspiration and his influences, as well as discussing his background in law and criminology.

Mr. Doctor also signed and hand-numbered 50 of the sold-out 100 box sets of the remastered CDs, 30 of which were sold to fan club members.

== Members ==
Since Mark of the Beast was never released, it's assumed that musicians and crew are the same from The Girl Who Was...Death.

- Mr. Doctor – vocals (1987–1996), organ (1989), organ, accordion (1990), lyrics, songwriting, producer, cover concept, lettering (1989–1996)
- Janez Hace – bass (1989, 1996)
- Bor Zuljan – guitars (1989–1996), e-bow (1990), bass (1992, 1993)
- Albert Dorigo – guitars (1989, 1990)
- Edoardo Beato – piano (1989, 1990), keyboards (1990)
- Davor Klarič – keyboards (1989, 1992–1996)
- Lučko Kodermac – drums (1989)
- Roberto Dani – percussion (1989–1993), drums (1990–1993), producer (1990–1992)
- Saša Olenjuk – violin (1989, 1992–1996)
- Katia Giubbilei – violin (1989, 1990)
- Rick Bosco – bass (1990)
- Francesco Carta – piano (1992–1996)
- Michel Fantini Jesurum – organ (1992–1996)
- Roman Ratej – drums (1996)

=== Other contributors ===
- Jurij Toni – tuba (1989, 1990), engineering (1989–1996), producer (1992–1996)
- Paolo Zizich – backing vocals, choir (1989–1996), duet (1990, 1992, 1993)
- Mojca Zlobko – harp (1989)
- Marjan Bunič – choir conductor (1989–1996), choirs (1989–1993)
- Damir Kamidoullin – cello (1992, 1993)
- Matej Kovačič – accordion (1992, 1993)
- Daniele Milanese Fatuzzo – cello (1992, 1993)
- Norina Radovon – soprano vocals (1996)
- Drago Ivanuša – accordion (1996)
- Irina Kevorkova – violin (1996)
- Igor Skerianec – cello (1996)
- Fraim Gashi – double bass (1996)

=== Choir members ===
- Beti Roblek (1990)
- Borut Usenik (1990)
- Helena Pančur (1990)
- Valentina Blažinšek (1990)
- Breda Bunič (1990, 1992, 1993)
- Polona Sever (1990, 1992, 1993)
- Grega Oblak (1990, 1992, 1993)
- Jure Strenčan (1990, 1992, 1993)
- Beti Strenčan (1992, 1993)
- Boris Kurent (1992, 1993)
- Mojca Sojer (1992, 1993)

== Discography ==
- Mark of the Beast (only one copy, never released) (1987)
- The Girl Who Was... Death (1989)
- Eliogabalus (1990)
- Sacrilegium (1992)
- The Sacrilege of Fatal Arms (Sacrilegium's extended version and movie soundtrack) (1993)
- Dies Irae (1996)
