= Toenut =

American rock band

Toenut, latterly known as Tyro, was an American alternative rock band of the 1990s, based in Atlanta and signed to the Mute Records label. The band released three records, the last under the name "Tyro", and toured the US and UK between 1995 and 2000. The band consists of Skipper Hartley and Richie Edelson.

== History ==
The band was formed in the summer of 1991 in Atlanta, Georgia, by Skipper Hartley and fellow guitarist Richie Edelson. By January 1992, they were playing shows in clubs in Atlanta with a line-up including vocalist Katie Walters and Elephants Gerald adding sampling effects. Hartley's former bandmate Chris Collins moved from Columbia, South Carolina to join as bassist, and several drummers joined the band for short periods.

In 1993, Toenut recorded their first single, "Heyward"/"Information", released on Half Baked Records. The single was heard by Mark Kramer, who invited the band to his Noise New Jersey studio to record a full-length demo, produced by Steve Watson.

In 1994, the band recruited their sixth drummer, Colin English, before signing to Mute Records. A modified version of the band's demo from Noise New Jersey was released on Mute in the summer of 1995 as their debut LP, Information. The album received airplay on MTV and made the College Media Journal charts, and was followed by a series of singles, including "Danger! Humans Approach", recorded at the Muscle Shoals Easley Studios. The track received airplay from John Peel on BBC Radio 1.

The band's former high-school colleague Eric Holowacz joined the band as stage producer and manager, and the band toured the Southeast, Midwest, and Northeast United States between 1995 and 1997, often with Man or Astro-man?. During this time, Holowacz created a concert-length stageshow in support of Information, using two 16mm film projections and two 35mm still slide projections simultaneously.

Toenut's second album, Two in the Piñata, was the next Mute release. On April 5, 1997, bassist Chris Collins was killed in an automobile accident as he drove to a show in Athens, Georgia. Following the accident, Toenut changed its name to Tyro and released Audiocards, before disbanding. Edelson and English joined Man or Astro-man?, Holowacz moved to South Carolina to become executive director of the Arts Council of Beaufort County, and subsequently to Wellington, New Zealand. Hartley and Walters, now married, continue to make music in Atlanta. Edelson works in the music and video production industry in Los Angeles.

== Discography ==
as Toenut

- Information (Mute Records 1995)
- Two in the Piñata (Mute Records 1997)

as Tyro

- Audiocards (Mute Records 2000)
