= The Schizoid Man (The Prisoner) =

- The Prisoner episode
- Episode no.: Series 1 Episode 5
- Directed by: Pat Jackson
- Written by: Terence Feely
- Production code: 7
- Original air date: 27 October 1967

Guest appearances
- Anton Rodgers; Jane Merrow; Earl Cameron

Episode chronology
← Previous "Free for All"	Next → "The General"

"The Schizoid Man" is an episode of the allegorical British science fiction TV series The Prisoner. It was written by Terence Feely, directed by Pat Jackson and was the seventh produced. It was the fifth episode to be broadcast in the UK, airing on ITV (ATV Midlands and Grampian) on 27 October 1967, and first aired in the United States on CBS on 6 July 1968.

The episode stars Patrick McGoohan as both Number Six and Number Twelve, an apparent double of Number Six, and features Anton Rodgers as Number Two.

== Plot summary ==
Number Two brings Number Twelve, an agent who looks just like Number Six, to The Village. The real Number Six is subjected to an intensive course of aversion therapy which alters his tastes and instincts and trains him to do everything left-handed; he is then drugged to wipe his memory of the treatment. When he awakes, he is treated as "Number Twelve", while the lookalike assumes the role of Number Six. The real Number Six is informed by Number Two of a plan to break "Number Six" (the impostor) by convincing him that he is not Number Six at all.

Number Six and Number Twelve engage in various challenges to prove which is the real Number Six; the aversion therapy allows the impostor to behave more like Number Six than the real Number Six does. In the presence of Number Two and Number Six, Number Twelve is challenged to demonstrate that his fingerprints are Number Six's; they are. He also has his characteristic left wrist mole, which Number Six has lost. Finally, Number Twenty-four, with whom Number Six had been practising telepathy with Zener cards earlier, is summoned because she supposedly has a unique "mental bond" with the real Number Six, but they fail a test with the cards.

Just as he appears to be "breaking", the real Number Six discovers a bruise on his fingernail that he got when Number Twenty-four tried to get his picture; as the bruise has migrated from the base of his fingernail to midway, he realizes that days or weeks have passed, not the single day shown on his calendar. He then gives himself an electric shock to reverse the aversion therapy. He physically overcomes Number Twelve, who reveals his name as Curtis. After being forced to reveal his password and remove the fake mole from his wrist, Curtis escapes and is mistakenly killed by Rover.

Posing as Curtis, Number Six reports to Number Two that "Number Six is dead". Having "failed", he is put blindfolded onto a helicopter to leave The Village and report his failure to his superiors. He believes himself to have duped Number Two into letting him escape, but the helicopter promptly circles back to The Village. Number Two reveals that he deduced the truth when Number Six agreed to give his regards to Number Twelve's wife, who is deceased.

== Cast ==
- Anton Rodgers as Number Two
- Jane Merrow as Alison (Number Twenty-Four)
- Earl Cameron as Supervisor
- Gay Cameron as Number Thirty-Six
- David Nettheim as Doctor
- Pat Keen as Nurse
- Gerry Crampton as Guardian
- Dinney Powell as Guardian

== Notes ==
- "The Schizoid Man" is the only episode in which Rover is mentioned by name.
- Alison is one of a very small number of Village residents or other characters on the series ever referred to by either a forename or surname.

== Broadcast ==
The broadcast date of the episode varied in different ITV regions of the UK. The episode was first shown at 7:30pm on Friday 27 October 1967 on ATV Midlands and Grampian Television, on Sunday 29 October on ATV London, Southern Television, Westward Television and Tyne-Tees; on Thursday 2 November on Scottish Television, on Friday 3 November on Anglia Television, on Thursday 16 November on Border Television and on Friday 24 November on Granada Television in the North West. The aggregate viewing figures for the ITV regions that debuted the season in 1967 have been estimated at 11.7 million. In Northern Ireland, the episode did not debut until Saturday 3 February 1968, and in Wales, the episode was not broadcast until Wednesday 4 February 1970.

== Sources ==
- Fairclough, Robert, ed. (2004). The Prisoner: The Original Scripts. Vol. 1. foreword by Lewis Greifer. Reynolds & Hearn. ISBN 978-1-903111-76-5. OCLC 61145235. – script of episode
