= Lewis Greifer =

Television, film, and radio writer (1915–2003)

Lewis Greifer (19 December 1915 – 18 March 2003) was an English writer for television, film, and radio.

Greifer was born in London, England. After wartime service in the Royal Air Force (RAF), he pursued a career in journalism and joined the London Evening Standard, where he worked from 1952 to 1956. He contributed sketches for radio, including for The Goon Show amongst others. In 1969, he diversified somewhat and devised Who-Dun-It for ATV, an audience participation series.

Greifer also wrote episodes of The Prisoner ("The General", 1967), Crossroads, and the initial draft of the Tom Baker Doctor Who story Pyramids of Mars. The latter script was radically rewritten by script editor Robert Holmes, who used the pseudonym Stephen Harris on the final product. Greifer had meanwhile returned to teach at the University of Tel Aviv, and had little contact with television in his remaining years.
