= List of The Prisoner episodes =

The Prisoner logo

The Prisoner is an allegorical British science fiction television series starring Patrick McGoohan. A single season of 17 episodes was filmed between September 1966 and January 1968. The first episode in the UK aired in September 1967, although the global premiere was in Canada several weeks earlier. The series was released in the US in June 1968.

With the production order being different from the original broadcast order, extensive debate has taken place among dedicated fans regarding the "correct" order to view these episodes. Several different orders are listed below.

== Episode list ==
Episode sequences

- Prod: The studio production order. This is not an intended viewing order.
- ITC: "Official" ITC sequence. This is the sequence in which the episodes were originally broadcast in the UK. This is the order used in all UK DVD and Blu-ray releases including the 2007 official 40th anniversary and 2017 official 50th anniversary Network DVD and Blu-ray releases.
- US Order: Used for the US airings, since the first showing on CBS in 1968. The original broadcast skipped "Living in Harmony", but the episode was reinstated in following re-airings.
- A&E: Used in the A&E DVDs.
- ITC Inf: The episodes as listed with synopses in a period ITC booklet titled Story Information, archived as storyinf.pdf on disc 5 of the 2009 Blu-ray set. This also gives the first episode title as "The Arrival". Known as 'The Warehouse Order', this order was largely used by Channel 4's transmission of the series in 1983-84
- KTEH: Arranged by Scott Apel for KTEH channel 54, a PBS member station in San Jose, California

| Title | Written by | Directed by | Original UK airdate | Number Two played by | Prod | ITC | US | A&E | Inf | KTEH |
|---|---|---|---|---|---|---|---|---|---|---|
| "Arrival" | George Markstein and David Tomblin | Don Chaffey | 29 September 1967 | Guy Doleman; George Baker | 1 | 1 | 1 | 1 | 1 | 1 |
After waking up in the Village and discovering his captivity there, Number Six encounters a friend from the outside who may have a possible escape.
| "The Chimes of Big Ben" | Vincent Tilsley | Don Chaffey | 6 October 1967 | Leo McKern | 5 | 2 | 2 | 5 | 7 | 4 |
A new prisoner, Nadia, may have information about the Village that makes an escape attempt possible.
| "A. B. and C." | Anthony Skene | Pat Jackson | 13 October 1967 | Colin Gordon | 10 | 3 | 3 | 6 | 3 | 9 |
A desperate Number Two manipulates Number Six's dreams to discover where his loyalties lie.
| "Free for All" | Patrick McGoohan (as "Paddy Fitz") | Patrick McGoohan | 20 October 1967 | Eric Portman; Rachel Herbert | 2 | 4 | 4 | 2 | 5 | 5 |
Presented with the opportunity, Number Six runs for election to the post of Number Two.
| "The Schizoid Man" | Terence Feely | Pat Jackson | 27 October 1967 | Anton Rodgers | 7 | 5 | 5 | 8 | 4 | 7 |
Number Two replaces Number Six with an identical duplicate (played by McGoohan) to weaken the real Six's sense of identity.
| "The General" | Lewis Greifer (as "Joshua Adam") | Peter Graham Scott | 3 November 1967 | Colin Gordon | 11 | 6 | 6 | 7 | 8 | 8 |
An important prisoner's new speed-teaching machine can be used to indoctrinate everyone into believing the same thing, posing perhaps the greatest threat to Number Six's independence.
| "Many Happy Returns" | Anthony Skene | Patrick McGoohan (as "Joseph Serf") | 10 November 1967 | Georgina Cookson | 13 | 7 | 7 | 9 | 2 | 6 |
After waking to find the Village deserted, Number Six returns to England, but he does not know whom he can trust there.
| "Dance of the Dead" | Anthony Skene | Don Chaffey | 17 November 1967 | Mary Morris | 4 | 8 | 8 | 3 | 12 | 2 |
Number Six tries to save an old friend who is headed for destruction at the hands of the Village.
| "Checkmate" | Gerald Kelsey | Don Chaffey | 24 November 1967 | Peter Wyngarde | 3 | 9 | 11 | 4 | 6 | 3 |
Number Six thinks he has a means to tell the prisoners from the warders.
| "Hammer into Anvil" | Roger Woddis | Pat Jackson | 1 December 1967 | Patrick Cargill | 12 | 10 | 14 | 12 | 10 | 14 |
Number Six takes revenge on a sadistic Number Two for the death of another prisoner.
| "It's Your Funeral" | Michael Cramoy | Robert Asher | 8 December 1967 | Derren Nesbitt; Andre Van Gyseghem | 8 | 11 | 10 | 10 | 9 | 11 |
To save the Village from calamitous consequences, Number Six must intervene in a Village power struggle and prevent the assassination of the retiring Number Two by his successor.
| "A Change of Mind" | Roger Parkes | Patrick McGoohan (as "Joseph Serf") | 15 December 1967 | John Sharp | 9 | 12 | 13 | 11 | 11 | 13 |
Number Two stirs the Village to ostracize Number Six, and then takes even more drastic measures to cure Six's "unmutuality".
| "Do Not Forsake Me Oh My Darling" | Vincent Tilsley | Pat Jackson | 22 December 1967 | Clifford Evans | 14 | 13 | 9 | 13 | 15 | 12 |
Deprived of his memory and placed in another man's body, Number Six travels back to England to seek a missing scientist. Nigel Stock portrays Number Six for most of this episode.
| "Living in Harmony" | David Tomblin and Ian L. Rakoff | David Tomblin | 29 December 1967 | David Bauer | 15 | 14 | 12 | 14 | 14 | 10 |
In an Old West setting, a lawman who resigned is trapped in a town called Harmony where the Judge wants him to be the new sheriff – by hook or by crook.
| "The Girl Who Was Death" | Terence Feely | David Tomblin | 18 January 1968 | Kenneth Griffith | 16 | 15 | 15 | 15 | 13 | 15 |
Number Six avoids the assassination attempts of a blonde-haired woman while foiling the plots of her megalomaniac father.
| "Once Upon a Time" | Patrick McGoohan | Patrick McGoohan | 25 January 1968 | Leo McKern | 6 | 16 | 16 | 16 | 16 | 16 |
Number Two subjects Number Six to Degree Absolute, a desperate, last-ditch effort to subdue him – an ordeal that will not end until it breaks one of them.
| "Fall Out" | Patrick McGoohan | Patrick McGoohan | 1 February 1968 | Leo McKern | 17 | 17 | 17 | 17 | 17 | 17 |
Number Six encounters the forces in charge of the Village, but can he finally escape?

== Alternative versions ==
Alternative versions of two episodes exist and have been commercially released. An early edit of "Arrival", with a different music score and additional dialogue and scenes not in the broadcast version, was located in the 2000s and released to DVD in the UK and in 2009 in the A&E Home Video DVD and Blu-ray box sets. This alternative version was located on a near-pristine 35mm print and has been transferred in high-definition along with the 17 episodes for the Blu-ray release. An early edit of "The Chimes of Big Ben", again with an unbroadcast music score and additional scenes and dialogue not in the broadcast version, was located in the 1980s and initially released on VHS videotape by MPI Home Video. It was later included as a bonus feature on the A&E Home Video DVD release of the series in the early 2000s. In 2009 it was also included in the expanded A&E Home Video box set, but owing to the low quality of the print it was not upgraded to high definition as was "Arrival", and was instead included as a bonus on the set's standard DVD extras disc, which was included in both the DVD and Blu-ray editions.

== Episode viewing order ==
General agreement exists on the first episode and the last two episodes of the 17 produced shows, but extensive debate has taken place among dedicated fans regarding a "correct" order for the intermediate 14 episodes. The order in which the episodes were originally broadcast in Britain differs from the order in which they were produced. Even the broadcast order is not that originally intended by series star and co-creator Patrick McGoohan. Many have analysed the series line-by-line for time references, which in many cases provide different—sometimes radically different—episode orders compared to the broadcast order.

Ian Rakoff (assistant editor on two episodes and co-writer of "Living in Harmony") authored a book in 1998 on his experience working on the series, wherein the appendices include a numbered episode guide which reflects the original UK broadcast order, as do the nine-volume Laserdisc releases of the series, also released in 1998. However, the 2006 40th Anniversary Collector's Edition (DVD boxed set) released by A&E Home Video in the United States uses a different order. The set goes so far as to include a guidebook with justifications for their version, citing—among other reasons—the aforementioned "time references", such as Number Six telling other members of the Village that he is "new here".

The first UK transmission of each of the first 14 episodes was made by ATV (Midlands) and Grampian Television. The final three episodes were first shown in the UK by Scottish Television.

== Unproduced episodes ==
Story lines and scripts that the series did not use are known to exist, some of which were published in a two-volume collection – The Prisoner: The Original Scripts – Volume 1 & 2 edited by Robert Fairclough and published by Reynolds and Hearn in 2005 and 2006. The scripts and story outlines were also included in PDF form as a DVD-ROM bonus feature on the 2007 and 2009 DVD box set issues of The Prisoner by Network Distributing.

- "The Outsider" by Moris Farhi (complete script included in Volume 1)
- "Ticket to Eternity" by Eric Mival (synopsis included in Volume 1)
- "Friend or Foe" by Eric Mival (synopsis included in Volume 1)
- "Don't Get Yourself Killed" by Gerald Kelsey (complete script included in Volume 2)

== Documentary ==
A documentary entitled Don't Knock Yourself Out was produced in 2007, containing behind-the-scenes footage, and archival and newly recorded interviews with the cast and production staff. It is narrated by Neil Pearson and runs approximately 90 minutes.
