= Kamahl =

Australian singer and entertainer (born 1934)

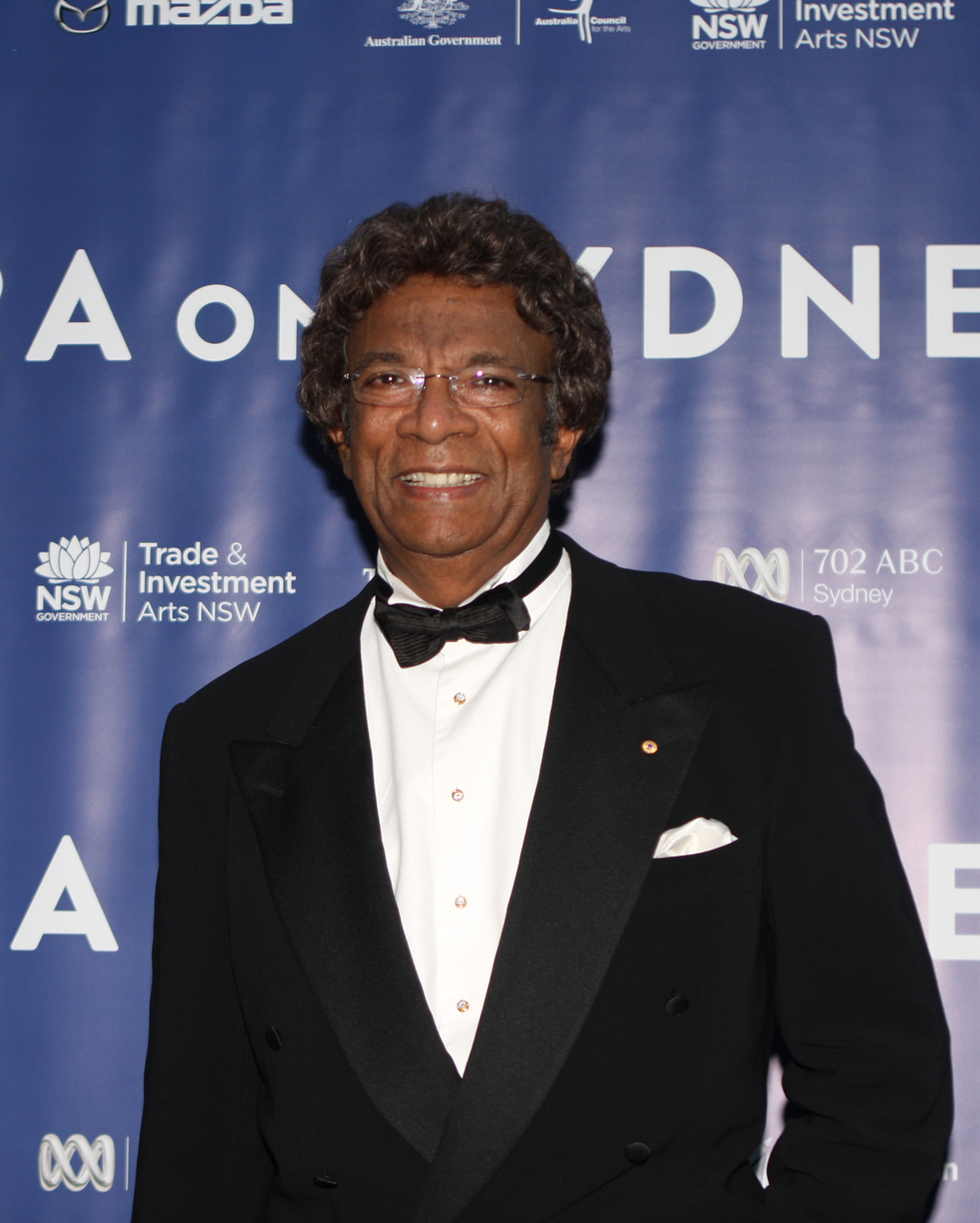
- Kamahl in 2012

Background information
- Born: Kandiah Kamalesvaran; 13 November 1934 (age 92); Kuala Lumpur, Federated Malay States
- Origin: Australia
- Genre: Adult contemporary
- Occupation: Singer
- Years active: 1958–present
- Labels: Philips; EMI; Mercury Records; Festival Records; Dino Records; Reader's Digest; ABC Music

Kandiah Kamalesvaran (Tamil: கந்தையா கமலேஸ்வரன்; born 13 November 1934), better known by his stage name Kamahl, is an Australian singer and recording artist. He has been in the Australian music industry for over 70 years and has made TV and film appearances, as well as concerts.

He has sold over 20 million records and recorded more than 30 albums. His highest-charting Australian single, "Sounds of Goodbye" (1969), reached the top 20 on the Kent Music Report singles chart. Another single, "The Elephant Song" (1975), peaked at number one in both the Netherlands and Belgium.

== Early life ==
Kamahl was born on 13 November 1934 in the Brickfields district of Kuala Lumpur, Federated Malay States, to Ceylonese Tamil and Hindu parents, the second eldest of six children. Kamahl's father, a chief clerk in the engineering department of Malaya Railways had migrated from Ceylon (now Sri Lanka) to Malaya in 1919. From 1936–1938, the young Kamahl lived with his mother in her hometown of Jaffna in Ceylon. He then returned to Kuala Lumpur, where he grew up until attending school at King's College in Adelaide, South Australia, from 1953–1955. His father was head of the local Tamil music school. Kamahl studied at the Victoria Institution. He suffered sexual abuse in his childhood by three different adults. He lived through the Japanese occupation of Malaya during World War II.

He arrived in Adelaide, South Australia, in April 1953, and finished high school at King's College. He then enrolled at the University of Adelaide, studying architecture to please his parents.

== Music career ==
Kamahl developed an interest in singing at university. He went on the television talent program Australia's Amateur Hour and won the state final which led to further television and club engagements. He dropped out of his architecture course and became a full-time entertainer. He also studied at the Elder Conservatorium of Music for a year.

At his early public performances, from 1958, he shortened his name to Kamal. Successive masters of ceremonies announced him as "camel", so he changed its spelling to Kamahl. Rupert Murdoch was an important early benefactor, tipping Kamahl £10 at a party in December 1958 and encouraging him to move to Sydney. Without asking, Murdoch arranged for Kamahl to perform a six-week season at the Australia Hotel in Sydney. After that season, he boarded with the Murdochs for two years.

In 1966, Kamahl was a finalist in the Sydney Eisteddfod Sun Aria, singing Verdi's "Ella giammai m'amò" and Mussorgsky's "Farewell and Death of Boris". He co-wrote and sang the theme song for the 1967 feature film, Journey Out of Darkness, which he also acted in.

He was one of the first people to appear in concert at the Sydney Opera House. He has performed at the London Palladium and Carnegie Hall as well as pubs and clubs throughout Australia.

His first album, A Voice to Remember, was released in Australia in October 1967. He released singles and albums in the United States, Canada, Britain, New Zealand, South America, India, Singapore, Malaysia and Germany (in German), as well as in the Netherlands, Belgium and Scandinavia. From 1967 onwards in Australia, his records, tapes and CDs were primarily on the Philips label, but he also recorded on EMI, Mercury, Festival, Dino and Reader's Digest.

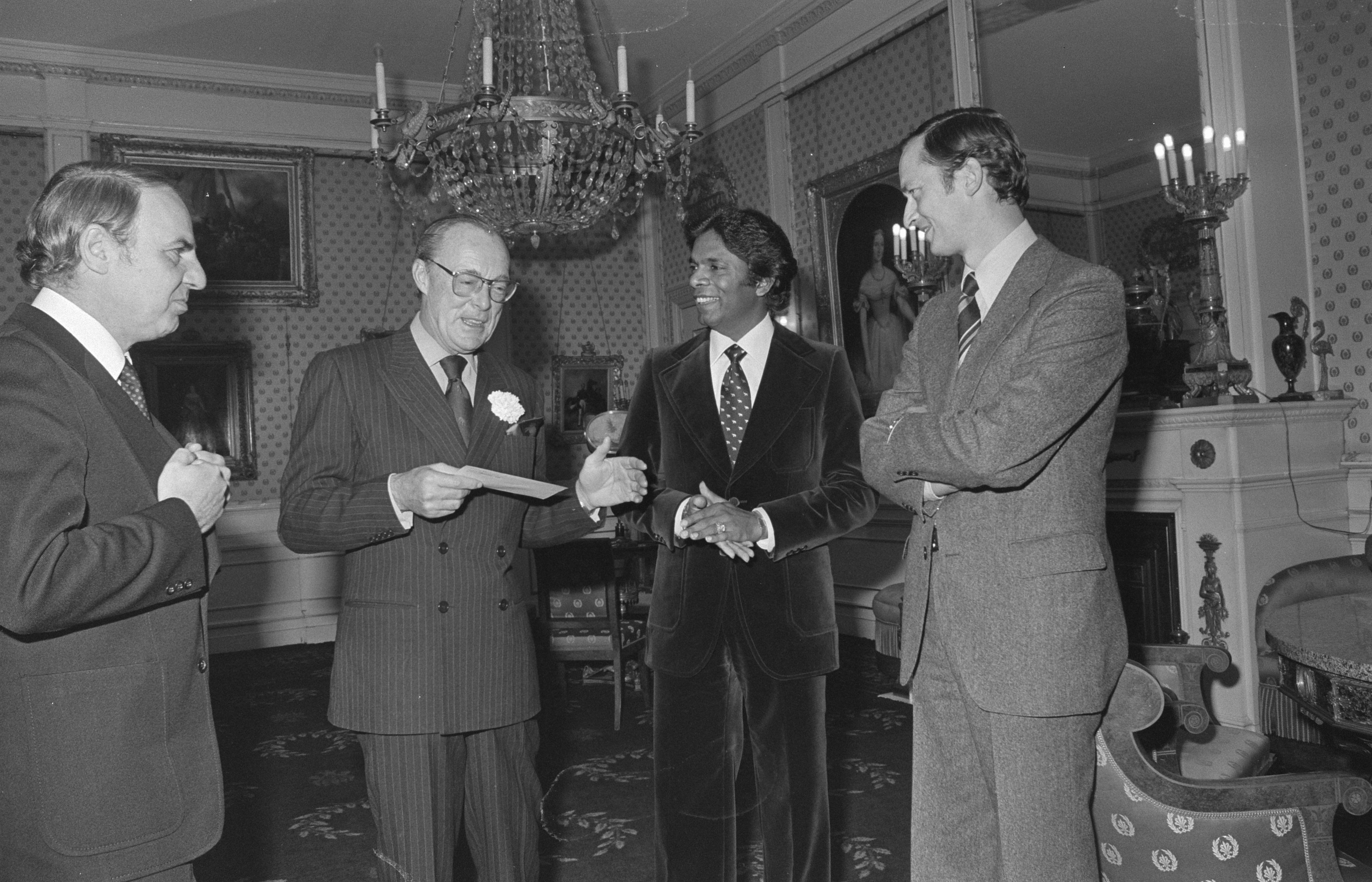
Kamahl presents a cheque for the World Wildlife Fund to Prince Bernhard of Lippe-Biesterfeld, 1975

In 1975, his single, "The Elephant Song", composed and produced by Hans van Hemert, reached number one on the Dutch Top 40, the Nationale Hitparade, currently Single Top 100, and the Belgian BRT Top 30. This song was part of the soundtrack of a World Wildlife Fund TV documentary. In 1978, Billboard reported "The Elephant Song" was the biggest selling single ever in Sweden.

In 2004, he appeared at the Big Day Out rock festival. In early 2008, Kamahl reunited with his old school, Pembroke, then Kings College, and went on tour in the United States with the Pembroke Symphony Orchestra.

Kamahl has released albums through ABC Music, a compilation Christmas album entitled Peace On Earth (2012), and a three-CD collection of favourites entitled Heart and Soul: For Lovers Of Life (2015).

== Acting and media appearances ==
Kamahl appeared in the Adelaide Festival of Arts plays Moon on a Rainbow Shawl in 1961 and Volpone in 1963. He also played John the Baptist in a production of Salome and appeared in Othello. In the 1967 film Journey Out of Darkness, Kamahl played an Aboriginal Australian.

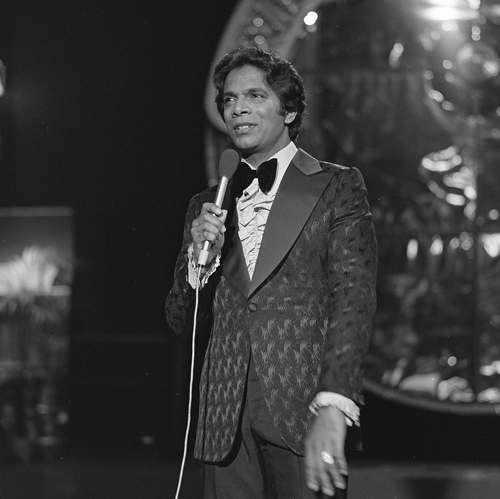
Kamahl on Dutch television in 1977

Kamahl was a popular guest on the variety show Hey Hey It's Saturday. In 2009, he criticised the show for its treatment of him during his appearances. His feelings were revealed to the Australian public shortly after Harry Connick Jr. complained of a "black faces" skit for the show's "Red Faces" segment. In April 2021, the former compere Daryl Somers wrote a lengthy apology to Kamahl and to those who found the show's content offensive.

In 2003, he had cameos in the Australian films Harvie Krumpet and Fat Pizza. In 2005, he made appearances as a judge on The X Factor. In September 2007, he appeared on The Chaser's War on Everything on ABC TV where he sang for a "newly-wed couple" who turned up uninvited at his door.

Kamahl appeared in an episode of the Australian TV quiz show Spicks and Specks, first broadcast in September 2010. In 2011, Kamahl made a cameo appearance on Swift and Shift Couriers as a phone store employee. In 2012, Kamahl made appearances in Prime's show The Unbelievable Truth. In May 2013, the Australian drama, Offspring, broadcast an episode which had Kamahl in a minor role as a medical specialist.

== Other work ==
In 1988, Kamahl appeared in a television commercial for Dilmah tea. In 2005, he had a sponsorship deal with Coca-Cola. In 2007, he made commercials for the Australian cable channel Fox8, advertising its WWE programming.

His biography, Kamahl: The Triumph of Hope, written by Keith Cameron is scheduled to be released on 15 November 2024.

== Personal life ==
In 1967, Kamahl married an Indo-Fijian woman, Sahodra, of whom his family did not approve. "There was no way my parents would've given their blessing." They have two children, Rajan, born in 1969, and Rani, born in 1971. Rani had a brief singing career which reached its peak in the late 1990s.

In November 2021, Kamahl revealed that he and Sahodra had separated after 55 years of marriage. He cited social media addiction as the cause of their separation, telling A Current Affair: "I'm Twittering day and night, and now, I'm paying a terrible price for it." He remained an avid Twitter user in the aftermath of his divorce, with the vast majority of his tweets being criticism of Donald Trump, but has since deleted his account.

In 2023, Kamahl first came out against the Indigenous Voice to Parliament and then changed his position to support it, leading Australian Prime Minister Anthony Albanese to coin the phrase "Kamahl-mentum" referring to a person who "came out and said No and went away, spoke to people, read what it was about, read the question and decided that he would come out and declare his support for Yes." However, in September 2023, Kamahl changed his position once again and ultimately did not support the Voice.

=== Intimidation charge ===
In May 2024, Kamahl was charged with "stalking and intimidation" concerning text messages allegedly sent to an unnamed 38-year-old woman, with NSW Police seeking an apprehended violence order against him as a result. He told Nine News that he had agreed to lend her $2,000 for a business after they had met for dinner and that she agreed to pay him back in $5 instalments. Screenshots of the exchange shared by Nine show the transaction description for the first $5 reading "to the molestor [sic]", and the message "I just wanted you to know that your behaviour is unacceptable and you're lucky I haven't gone to the authorities", to which Kamahl replied: "You are a liar, and a failure, and most of all, an ungrateful bitch. The best is yet to come." Kamahl told Nine that he was "responding to a situation without all of (his) faculties." While stating that the "molestor" remark had inflamed the conflict, Nine, the ABC and The Guardian also explicitly stated that Kamahl was not being charged with molestation and all emphasised they were not suggesting he was guilty of any such offence.

The matter was heard before the Sutherland Local Court in June 2024, where Kamahl's lawyer Bobby Hill made a section 14 application under the Mental Health and Cognitive Impairment Forensic Provisions Act 2020 which would see the charge dismissed on mental health grounds. Hill told the ABC he wished to have the matter "diverted away from the criminal justice system into the hands of a medical professional... I think (Kamahl) has willingly stated that he was not taking medication at the time. He's an 89-year-old man. I'm sure his mental health and his totality of health is going to be a major feature of these proceedings." The charge was dismissed in 2024, with a magistrate ruling that the matter should be dealt with on mental health grounds.

== Discography ==
In 1985, the Chicago Tribune reported Kamahl as having sold "more than 20 million records worldwide" and "76 gold and 14 platinum records". In a 2007 press release, Kamahl's records were said to have achieved gold and platinum status over 80 times. In 2018, Port News reported Kamahl as having recorded more than 30 albums and earned "more than 100 gold and platinum records".

=== Studio albums ===
List of albums, with selected chart positions
Title	Album details	Peak chart positions				Certification
Title	Album details	AUS	NED	NZ	SWE	Certification
A Voice to Remember	Released: 1967; Label: Philips (PDS 285)	—	—	—	—	
Dreams of Love	Released: 1969; Label: Philips (PDS 308)	7	—	—	—	
Sounds of Kamahl	Released: September 1970; Label: Philips (PDS 345)	13	—	—	—	
Peace on Earth	Released: 1970; Label: Philips (6830 045); Note: Christmas album	—	—	—	—	
Kamahl	Released: October 1971; Label: Philips (6830 077)	40	—	1 (Note: Kamahl peaked at number 1 in NZ in 1978)	—	NZ: 3× Platinum
Friend	Released: 1973; Label: Philips (6357 013)	—	—	—	—	
I Think of You	Released: 1973; Label: Philips (6357 014)	—	—	—	—	
Encore	Released: May 1975; Label: Philips (6357 022)	35	—	—	—	
Let It Be Me	Released: June 1975; Label: Philips (6357 024)	69	—	—	—	
The Elephant Song	Released: July 1975; Label: Philips (6357 029)	—	1	—	3	
If I Give My Heart to You	Released: 1975; Label: Philips (6357 030)	—	—	—	—	
Christmas with Kamahl	Released: December 1975; Label: Philips (6357 035); Note: Christmas album	—	6	—	—	
Save the Oceans	Released: May 1976; Label: Philips (6357 040)	—	2	—	—	
Lovin' Kind	Released: May 1977; Label: Philips (6357 046)	61	—	—	—	
Love Is a Beautiful Song	Released: December 1977; Label: Philips (6357 051)	65	—	—	—	
Portrait of My Love	Released: May 1978; Label: Philips (6357 053)	80	—	—	—	
Smile	Released: March 1979; Label: Philips (6357 060)	—	—	3	—	
She Believes in Me	Released: December 1979; Label: Philips (6357 066)	99	—	—	—	
Treat Her Like a Lady	Released: 1980; Label: Philips (6437 125)	—	—	—	—	
Somebody Loves You	Released: April 1982; Label: Philips / Mercury (6437 145)	—	—	4	—	
This Love We Share	Released: 1983; Label: Attic (LAT 1180)	—	—	—	—	
Love United	Released: 1984; Label: Attic (LAT 1203)	—	—	—	—	
You Are Everything	Released: 1985; Label: Festival (L-38478)	—	—	—	—	
Precious Words and Soothing Songs	Released: May 1990; Label: Dino Music (DIN133)	28	—	—	—	
Anything for Love	Released: May 1993; Label: Dino Music (DIN249D)	30	—	—	—	
How Great Thou Art	Released: 2013; Label: Southern Cross Music (SCMO7)	—	—	—	—	

=== Live albums ===
List of live albums, with selected chart positions
Title	Album details	Peak chart positions		
Title	Album details	AUS	NZ	SWE
Kamahl in London	Released: 1972; Label: Philips (6357 006)	—	—	—
Kamahl at the Opera House	Released: May 1974; Label: Philips (6499 983)	16	—	38
Live at Carnegie Hall	Released: November 1976; Label: Philips (9286 493)	19	16	—
Kamahl on Tour	Released: 1980; Label: Philips	—	17	—

=== Charting compilation albums ===
List of compilation albums, with selected chart positions
Title	Album details	Peak chart positions			Certification
Title	Album details	AUS	NED	NZ	Certification
Chanson D'Amour	Released: November 1975 {The Netherlands}; Label: Philips (6357 036)	—	9	—	
You Bring Out the Best	Released: 1980; Label: Philips (6603 001)	79	—	—	AUS: Platinum
20 Greatest Hits	Released: April 1982 {New Zealand}; Label:	—	—	17	
Always on My Mind	Released: November 1982; Label: J & B Records (JB-120)	48	—	—	
This Love We Share	Released: May 1984; Label: Festival RML (52045)	17	—	—	
Miracles and Old Toy Trains	Released: November 1984; Label: Festival RML (51002)	70	—	—	
25th Anniversary Album	Released: May 1992; Label: Dino Music (DIN203)	9	—	—	
The Elephant Song – Zijn 18 mooiste songs	Released: October 1992; Label: Quality Entertainment (QCD 92027)	—	45	—	
The Ultimate Collection	Released: November 1996; Label: Dino Music (DIN203)	—	—	34	

=== Charting singles ===
Year	Title	Peak chart positions			
Year	Title	AUS	BEL	NED	NZ
1969	"Sounds of Goodbye"	19	—	—	—
1969	"You've Got to Learn"	39	—	—	—
1970	"All I Have to Offer You (Is Me)"	49	—	—	—
1971	"100 Children"/"Danny Boy"	34	—	—	—
1972	"Love Is a Mountain"	86	—	—	—
1973	"Shame"	93	—	—	—
1974	"Our Love Song"	56	—	—	—
1975	"The Elephant Song"	55	1	1	38
1975	"Chanson d'Amour"	—	26	20	—
1975	"White Christmas"	—	—	10	—
1976	"Save the Oceans of the World"	—	—	14	—
1978	"What Would I Do Without My Music"	—	—	—	32
1980	"Save the Whale"	—	—	24	—
1981	"Before You There Was Nothing"	96	—	—	—
1981	"Hey There Lord"	100	—	—	—

== Awards and recognition ==
- 1994 – Member of the Order of Australia
- 1998 – Australian Father of the Year award
- 2004 – Australian Centenary Medal

In May 2006, he received another Australian honour when he was included in "Our Entertainers of the 20th Century". The award was organised by the Variety Club of Australia, the top entertainers of the century included Kylie Minogue, Dame Joan Sutherland, Jack Thompson and Graham Kennedy.

=== Mo Awards ===
The Australian Entertainment Mo Awards, commonly known informally as the Mo Awards, were annual Australian entertainment industry awards. They recognise achievements in live entertainment in Australia, from 1975 to 2016. Kamahl won three awards in that time.

Year	Nominee / work	Award	Result (wins only)
1982	Kamahl	Daily Telegraph Readers Award	Won
1983	Kamahl	Daily Telegraph Readers Award	Won
1984	Kamahl	Daily Telegraph Readers Award	Won
