= Do Not Forsake Me Oh My Darling =

- The Prisoner episode
- Episode no.: Series 1 Episode 13
- Directed by: Pat Jackson
- Written by: Vincent Tilsley
- Production code: 14
- Original air date: 22 December 1967

Guest appearances
- Clifford Evans; Nigel Stock; Zena Walker

Episode chronology
← Previous "A Change of Mind"	Next → "Living in Harmony"

"Do Not Forsake Me Oh My Darling" is an episode of the allegorical British science fiction TV series The Prisoner. It was written by Vincent Tilsley and directed by Pat Jackson, and it was the fourteenth produced. It was the thirteenth episode to be broadcast in the UK on ITV (ATV Midlands and Grampian) on Friday 22 December 1967, and it was first aired in the United States on CBS on Saturday 3 August 1968.

The episode stars Patrick McGoohan as Number Six and features Clifford Evans as Number Two.

Produced while Patrick McGoohan was in America filming Ice Station Zebra, the writers worked around McGoohan's absence by having Number Six's mind implanted in the body of another man (Nigel Stock), who is then sent out of the Village to help capture a scientist. As a result, McGoohan appears in the episode for only a couple of minutes.

The episode title, and the background music heard throughout it, derive from the American song "The Ballad of High Noon" – also called "Do Not Forsake Me, O My Darlin'" – introduced in the 1952 movie High Noon.

== Plot summary ==
In an atypical teaser before a modification of the standard opening sequence (different music from the point where Number Six wakes up after being gassed, and the usual Number Six/Number Two dialogue is absent), two men sit in the office of a senior intelligence officer named Sir Charles. They are analysing photographic slides by way of seeking clues that will lead them to locate a missing inventor named Professor Seltzman (later revealed to have developed a technology that can switch two people's minds into one another's bodies). They are unsuccessful.

A man referred to only as "Colonel" arrives at the Village and only then learns from a new Number Two that his mission is to trade bodies with Number Six, using Seltzman's system. Number Six had been the last agent to have contact with Seltzman. After the swap, Number Six (now in the Colonel's body, and retaining only his pre-Village memories) awakens in his old London apartment and soon sees an unfamiliar face in his mirror. His fiancée arrives and, of course, fails to recognise him. He prudently restrains himself from enlightening her. Despite the shock, he realises what has been done to him, maintains his cool, and sets about to regain his own body. After a visit to his former superiors (the most senior of them, Sir Charles Portland, previously seen in the teaser) avails him nothing, he attends his fiancée's birthday party. There, he retrieves an old photo lab receipt from her, which he had given her in pre-Village days. He implies his true identity to her and she seems to almost understand, as Sir Charles, her father, had not seemed willing to do. With the retrieved slides back at his flat – they had previously been taken by Sir Charles's minions, and then returned to the shop – he uses an alphanumeric code system based on Seltzman's name to select certain slides which, projected together and viewed with a special filter, reveal the location of Seltzman. This turns out to be (the fictitious) Kandersfeld, Austria, to which Number Six promptly travels. Seltzman is believed – at least by Number Two and his superiors – to have perfected the reversal of the mind swap process. This is exactly what Number Two wanted, and, Number Six having been followed, both men are gassed into unconsciousness and returned to The Village.

The restoration of the identities, however, takes a final unexpected twist: Seltzman agrees to oversee the switchback, but actually does a three-party switch: the body of Number Six gets his mind back, but the mind of the Colonel is transferred into the body of Seltzman, who then dies; Seltzman transfers his own mind into the body of the Colonel and then leaves on the helicopter before Number Two knows what is happening.

== Cast ==
- Zena Walker as Janet Portland
- Clifford Evans as Number Two
- Nigel Stock as The Colonel
- Angelo Muscat as The Butler
- Hugo Schuster as Professor Jacob Seltzman
- John Wentworth as Sir Charles Portland
- James Bree as Villiers
- Lloyd Lamble as Stapleton
- Patrick Jordan as Danvers
- Lockwood West as Camera shop manager
- Fredric Abbott as Potter
- Gertan Klauber as Cafe waiter
- Henry Longhurst as Old guest
- John Nolan as Young guest

== Original script ==
The original script for this episode, to be found in volume two of The Prisoner: The Original Scripts, is significantly different from the final version, while working with the same constraint of Patrick McGoohan's limited availability. The beginning is similar, with Number Two meeting the Colonel, here named Oscar, the man whose body Number Six's mind will occupy.

But in this earlier draft of the story, Number Six awakens in his flat in a furious mood, storming to his office to angrily resign. Only at the office does he realise that his appearance is not his own and that a year of his life is missing.

Fearing that this is a ploy to force him to reveal confidential information, Six leaves the office, determined to find "Saltzman" (who became Seltzman in the broadcast version), the inventor of the body-swap machine. Meanwhile, Number Six's former employer, the Colonel, is shown to be in collusion with a mysterious, unseen figure, an apparent agent of the Village. They are collaborating to manipulate Six into locating Saltzman, intending to follow Six as he finds the scientist.

Six returns to his house to find Janet, his fiancée, who does not recognise him. Six offers Janet a deal in exchange for locating her missing lover. He later meets her at her birthday party and reclaims from her a receipt for developed slides held at a camera shop, which Six gave to Janet a year ago. He proceeds to kiss her intimately, in a manner that reminds her of her disappeared lover, and then departs from the party.

Six procures the slides from the shop, which, overlaid atop each other, produce a map with a set of co-ordinates in Kanderfield, Austria. Six finds Saltzman there, and he convinces Saltzman of his identity by referring to their arranged meeting at which Six never arrived. However, Saltzman notices that someone has followed Number Six. It is Potter, a former colleague of Number Six's, sent by their employers to tail Six—and tailing Potter has been an agent of the Village, who gasses Saltzman, Six, and Potter unconscious and proceeds to transport the scientist and Number Six back to the Village.

Saltzman is forced to show his captors how to reverse the mind-transfer process to return Number Six and Oscar to their proper bodies. The Village lacked the ability to perform the reversal, which is why they wanted Saltzman. Saltzman says the reversal requires a third party as a "medium" for the transfer, and he volunteers himself. Number Two consents, and Six, Oscar and Saltzman are linked to the mind-transfer machine after Saltzman reconfigures it.

The unconscious body of Number Six awakens with the correct mind in place. However, the process has been too much for the elderly Saltzman, who is dying. Oscar is flown out of the Village in the helicopter while Number Six sits by the dying Saltzman's side. Later, Number Two basks in his victory while Six awaits Saltzman's end. But Six reveals that the reversal process never required a third man.

Saltzman then revives briefly, speaking of the orders of Number One, and then dies. Six grimly bids farewell to Saltzman—who is actually Oscar, in Saltzman's body. A horrified Number Two calls the control room only to learn that the helicopter and Saltzman are out of range.

This original version of the story is more deeply developed in almost all respects. Number Two is portrayed as an arrogant, self-satisfied braggart who boasts to the Butler of being the one Number Two who will not be leaving his position. While the televised version ignores the issue of Number Six's resignation, the original script has Six angrily carrying it out. His interactions with Janet are also slightly different, with Janet being forceful and unwilling to play what she thinks is a game with an employee of her father's.

Absent from the televised version but present here is the treachery of Number Six's superior, the Colonel, speaking to an unidentified 'Voice' who is never seen and is observing the transplanted Number Six's actions. Finally, the script makes inventive use of McGoohan's short time. One scene has Number Two conversing with Oscar-in-Six's-body, who is represented through what the script describes as a single shot of McGoohan. Later, the script has Number Two watching "appropriate stockshots" of Number Six, whose body Oscar occupies, with Number Two commenting that Oscar lacks Six's charm, and when Six awakens restored to his own body, he declares, "I'll tell you nothing! I'm a free man!"

At the end, Six sits with the dying Saltzman before revealing that the reversal process did not need three men. "Only one could end up free," says Number Six in this brief scene. "It could have been me. But I felt it should be Saltzman. Because I'm going to escape anyway."

This script was apparently rewritten, in the absence of Patrick McGoohan and after the departure of script editor George Markstein, becoming what was seen onscreen.

== Broadcast ==
The broadcast date of the episode varied in different ITV regions of the UK. The episode was first shown at 7:30pm on Friday 22 December 1967 on ATV Midlands and Grampian Television, on Friday 29 December on Anglia Television, on Thursday 4 January 1968 on Scottish Television, on Sunday 7 January on ATV London, whose broadcasts were also taken up by Southern Television, Westward Television and Tyne-Tees; on Friday 12 January on Border Television and on Friday 19 January on Granada Television in the North West. The aggregate viewing figures for the ITV regions that debuted the season in 1967 have been estimated at 7.3 million. In Northern Ireland, the episode did not debut until Saturday 23 March 1968, and in Wales, the episode was not broadcast until Wednesday 25 March 1970.

== Sources ==
- Fairclough, Robert, ed. (February 2006). The Prisoner: The Original Scripts. Vol. 2. foreword by Roger Parkes. Reynolds & Hearn. ISBN 978-1-903111-81-9. OCLC 61145235. – script of episode
- White, Matthew; Jaffer Ali (1988). The Official Prisoner Companion. London: Sidgwick & Jackson. ISBN 0-283-99598-X.
