= Living in Harmony (The Prisoner) =

- The Prisoner episode
- Episode no.: Series 1 Episode 14
- Directed by: David Tomblin
- Written by: David Tomblin; Ian L. Rakoff
- Production code: 15
- Original air date: 29 December 1967

Guest appearances
- Alexis Kanner; David Bauer; Valerie French

Episode chronology
← Previous "Do Not Forsake Me Oh My Darling"	Next → "The Girl Who Was Death"

"Living in Harmony" is an episode of the allegorical British science fiction TV series The Prisoner. It was written by David Tomblin and Ian L. Rakoff and directed by Tomblin and was the fifteenth produced. It was broadcast in the UK on ITV (ATV Midlands and Grampian) on Friday 29 December 1967 and was not screened in the United States on CBS during the initial network run.

The episode differs from most others in the series as it does not begin with the show's standard opening credits sequence.

== Plot summary ==
This episode is a Wild West allegory of all the other episodes of The Prisoner. Number Six is again a non-conformist and refuses to be a number or to blend in with the other members of the Village. He refuses to accept things the way they are and wants to escape and expose the Village.

The episode begins with a Western paraphrase of the regular opening sequence, with Number Six, dressed as a Sheriff, turning in his badge and his gun (i.e., resigning). Leaving town, without a horse but still carrying his saddle, he is attacked by several men in the countryside as the episode title "Living in Harmony" appears on screen, where one would expect to see the series' name. (The "I am not a number" dialogue that usually follows the title caption in other episodes is omitted.) Number Six wakes from his beating and finds himself in a strange Western town. A Mexican man tells him that he is in the town of Harmony. Number Six goes into a saloon and meets the mayor of the town, also called The Judge. He meets with an intense mute young man known as The Kid who guards the jail. A saloon girl is also introduced, Kathy.

After unintentionally agitating a mob into trying to lynch him, Number Six is taken into "protective custody." To satisfy the mob's bloodlust, the Judge allows them to lynch Kathy's brother. She, fearing for Number Six's life, goes into the jail, distracts the Kid, steals the keys then passes them to Number Six. He escapes, only to be lassoed and brought back to town by the Judge's henchmen. At an impromptu trial, the Judge announces that Number Six is free to go as he was only in protective custody, but Kathy is guilty of aiding a prisoner to escape, as she did not know he was merely in protective custody. The Judge then makes Number Six a deal: if he will become the sheriff of the town, Kathy is free to go. The Judge insinuates that she may not be safe with the Kid watching over her. Reluctantly, Number Six agrees and takes the badge, but refuses to wear a gun. The Judge, disappointed, plans to get him to carry a gun by making unarmed men attack him.

Number Six asks Kathy to escape with him, but while he is clearing the way the Judge gets the Kid to kidnap Kathy. However, the Kid takes it too far and strangles her to death. Number Six finds her and buries her. He then turns in his badge but picks up the gun, has a showdown with the Kid and kills him. The Judge arrives with several armed men and upon learning of Kathy's death gives Number Six the ultimatum to work for him or be killed. Although Number Six picks off the Judge's men, he is then shot by the Judge. He awakens lying on the floor of the empty saloon. He is wearing his usual Village clothes rather than Western wear, along with headphones and a microphone. All the characters that he saw are present only as cardboard cutouts.

Number Six wanders groggily out of Harmony and finds that it is just an annexe of the Village. He rushes to the Green Dome and finds the Judge (the new Number Two) and the Kid (Number Eight). Number Six glowers at them, notices Kathy (Number Twenty-two), and walks out disdainfully. Number Two and Number Eight discuss the failure of their experiment. Number Twenty-two is obviously distressed and rushes out of the Green Dome. Number Eight follows her back to the saloon, calls her "Kathy," and starts strangling her as if the role-playing were continuing. She screams. Number Six hears and rushes over, but too late. Number Twenty-two dies in his arms, in her last words wishing it had all been real. Number Two arrives and Number Eight frantically throws himself off the saloon balcony to his death.

== Cast ==
- Patrick McGoohan as Number Six
- Alexis Kanner as The Kid/Number 8
- David Bauer as The Judge/Number Two
- Valerie French as Kathy/Number 22
- Gordon Tanner as Town Elder
- Michael Balfour as Will
- Larry Taylor as Mexican Sam

== Production ==
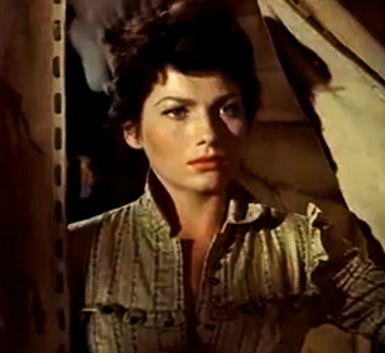
Valerie French guest-starred in the episode as Kathy/Number 22

"Living in Harmony" was directed by David Tomblin and written by Tomblin and Ian L. Rakoff. The series' lead star and co-creator, Patrick McGoohan said in a 1977 interview that the episode was created as the series was short of a story and he really had the desire to act in a Western.

According to Patrick McGoohan, The Prisoner had originally been conceived by him as a serial of seven episodes, but ITC managing director Lew Grade had the intention to sell the series to an American network and therefore demanded twenty-six episodes. As CBS would only purchase the series as a summer filler, they made a compromise and decided upon seventeen episodes as evidenced by the October 1966 CBS Press release: "the network recently purchased a British adventure series titled The Prisoner. The series stars Patrick McGoohan of Secret Agent and consists of 17 hour shows in color." After a break in production after the completion of the first 13 episodes, a further four storylines were created, one of which was "Living in Harmony". As McGoohan would later state, the goal of "Living in Harmony" and other padding episodes, was to "make them as visually exciting as possible but still retaining within them part of the theme of violence doesn't pay off".

With script editor George Markstein having quit the project after 13 episodes, taking his team of writers with him, McGoohan and Tomblin asked the production crew to submit ideas for further episodes. Music editor Eric Mival submitted two ideas ("Friend or Foe" and "Ticket to Eternity"), and assistant editor Ian Rakoff, film librarian Tony Sloman, and assistant director John O'Connor one each. Only Rakoff's storyline was accepted, and as a result McGoohan commissioned him to write the episode. For the theme of the episode, Rakoff drew largely upon his personal experiences as part of a leftist movement in South Africa during its apartheid regime, as he believed the policies and philosophy of the apartheid regime resembled that of the village. The idea of a sheriff refusing to bear arms was directly inspired by an incident that occurred while Rakoff was in South Africa, when during a night out he had the intention of shooting a man he considered to be a racist but was stopped by another group member. Rakoff explained "Later, I was warned. If I'd wanted to go from associate to full member of the group, I'd have to be more disciplined and give up the gun. It was irresponsible in that world, at that time". In addition to his personal experiences Rakoff was influenced by cowboy Marvel Comics, the title of the episode, as well as its opening sequence were lifted from Gene Autry comic books.

Somewhat of a dispute arose after the episode's production, as Rakoff claimed Tomblin had claimed the lion's share of the writing credit, while he wrote most of the episode. According to Rakoff, Tomblin was able to do so in absence of McGoohan, who was in the United States filming Ice Station Zebra. Aside from this conflict, stuntman Frank Maher also claimed part of the credit for this episode in that he suggested at one point to Patrick McGoohan that the series should include an episode with a western style theme.

During the first American broadcast of the series, "Living in Harmony" was not included. It has been claimed that this was because of the episode's reference to hallucinogenic drug use, yet several authors have disputed this argument, since mind-altering drugs were also present in various other episodes, yet these were not censored. Instead, they argue that the network feared Number Six's refusal to carry arms could be interpreted as an anti-war statement. As the plot was recognisably American, being a Western, they argue, the network banned the episode in fear that it carried with it a message against US involvement in the Vietnam War. Other writers have since claimed that the episode's implied war commentary was why it was not shown during its original US run; however, CBS executive Henry Colman claimed in an interview that the decision was his alone, and that a story in the news that week would have made it insensitive to air the episode.

== Broadcast ==
The broadcast date of the episode varied in different ITV regions of the UK. The episode was first shown at 7:30pm on Friday 29 December 1967 on ATV Midlands and Grampian Television, on Saturday 6 January 1968 on Anglia Television (a change from the previous Friday timeslot), on Thursday 11 January on Scottish Television, on Sunday 14 January on ATV London, whose broadcasts were also taken up by Southern Television, Westward Television and Tyne-Tees; on Friday 19 January on Border Television and on Friday 26 January on Granada Television in the North West. The aggregate viewing figures for the ITV regions that debuted the season in 1967 have been estimated at 7.3 million. In Northern Ireland, the episode did not debut until Saturday 30 March 1968, and in Wales, the episode was not broadcast until Wednesday 1 April 1970.

== Reception ==
"Living in Harmony" is one of the few episodes that do not start with the show's regular opening sequence. This was meant to challenge the audience, and stimulate them to actively engage in the show, yet it confused audiences when the episode was first broadcast in the United Kingdom, as Rakoff writes in Inside The Prisoner: Radical Television and Film in the 1960s.

The Scotsman critic Stephen McGinty felt the series "jumped the shark" with the episode.

== Sources ==
- Fairclough, Robert, ed. (1 February 2006). The Prisoner: The Original Scripts. Vol. 2. foreword by Roger Parkes. Reynolds & Hearn. ISBN 978-1-903111-81-9. OCLC 61145235. – script of episode
- Maggio, Nicole (2008). "The Whole Earth as Village": A Chronotopic Analysis of Marshall McLuhan's "Global Village" and Patrick McGoohan's The Prisoner (PDF) (Master's Thesis thesis). Brock University.
