= It's Your Funeral =

- The Prisoner episode
- Episode no.: Series 1 Episode 11
- Directed by: Robert Asher
- Written by: Michael Cramoy
- Production code: 8
- Original air date: 8 December 1967

Guest appearances
- Derren Nesbitt; Annette Andre; Mark Eden; André van Gyseghem

Episode chronology
← Previous "Hammer into Anvil"	Next → "A Change of Mind"

"It's Your Funeral" is an episode of the allegorical British science fiction TV series, The Prisoner. It was written by Michael Cramoy and directed by Robert Asher and eighth produced. It was the eleventh episode to be broadcast in the UK on ITV (ATV Midlands and Grampian) on Friday 8 December 1967 and first aired in the United States on CBS on Saturday 10 August 1968.

The episode stars Patrick McGoohan as Number Six and features André van Gyseghem as the retiring Number Two and Derren Nesbitt as the new Number Two. In this episode, a young successor to Number Two plots to assassinate the retiring Number Two and ensure his own success.

== Plot summary ==
Number Six is awakened one morning by a young woman, Number Fifty, who tells him an assassination is being planned and asks him to help her prevent it. He does not believe her, thinking that she's working for Number Two. Number Two monitors the scene. Later that day, Number Six meets another prisoner who tells him about jammers, people within the Village who concoct false escape plots, which Control is obliged to investigate. Number Six is told that Control has a list of these people and ignores their warnings.

The following morning, Number Two has a meeting with the Computer Attendant (Number Eight) and Number 100. The computer has plotted Number Six's daily routine. When Number Two learns that Number Six will be attending his weekly kosho workout that morning, he realises everything is going according to plan. Number 100 is sent to the gym and replaces Number Six's watch with an identical one, which is broken. Number Six thinks his watch has stopped and takes it to the watchmaker (Number Fifty-four) to be mended.

While the watchmaker is in the back room mending his watch, Number Six notices a detonation device that can be operated by radio. As he leaves the shop, Number Six meets Number Fifty again and learns that she is the watchmaker's daughter. He also learns that the watchmaker is planning to assassinate Number Two. Number 100 assures Number Two that the watchmaker is too thoroughly indoctrinated to want to assassinate Number Two.

Now believing the story, and realising that if the assassination is successful, the whole Village would be punished, Number Six goes to inform Number Two of the plot. Number Two, secretly filming their meeting, tells Number Six that the watchmaker is a jammer and Control is not concerned about him. He asks Number Six to find out how they intend to kill him, as it will give him a good laugh.

That evening, Number Six and Number Fifty return to the watchmaker's shop, where they discover the watchmaker is making a replica of the Great Seal of Office. They realise that this will be filled with explosives and detonated during the forthcoming Appreciation Day ceremony.

Number Six returns to Number Two's house the following day, but he meets a different Number Two. This Number Two, seemingly the "primary" Number Two with the others Number Six had dealt with being substitutes for him while he was away, is older and tells Number Six that he is aware of the warning – in fact, Number Six has warned every previous Number Two that they are to be assassinated, and he is not concerned because he is about to retire. Number Six is shown footage of himself purportedly warning previous Number Twos, which has actually been cut together from the film of his meeting with the younger Number Two. Number Six says that the film is fake and that the plot is being mastered by his successor (the younger Number Two). The older Number Two starts to believe Number Six, as his employers are not the sort of people who pay pensions. The younger Number Two assures Number One that the assassination will proceed successfully.

On Appreciation Day, the watchmaker hides in the tower ready to detonate the bomb when the seal of office is placed around the retiring Number Two's neck. He is seen by his daughter and Number Six, who both race to the tower to stop him. Number Six gets the detonator, but is confronted by Number 100, who tries to take it from him. While they are fighting, the seal of office is transferred to the distinctly nervous new Number Two. Number Six then gives the old Number Two the detonator, telling him that it is his passport out of the Village. He goes to the helicopter and leaves.

In the closing scenes of the episode, Number Six congratulates the new Number Two, assuring him that something equally suitable will be arranged when he retires.

== Cast ==
- Derren Nesbitt as the new Number Two
- Annette Andre as the Watchmaker's Daughter
- Mark Eden as Number One-Hundred
- André van Gyseghem as Retiring Number Two
- Martin Miller as Watchmaker
- Wanda Ventham as Computer attendant
- Mark Burns as Number Two's assistant (#32)
- Peter Swanwick as the Supervisor
- Charles Lloyd-Pack as Artist
- Grace Arnold as Number Thirty-Six
- Arthur White as Stallholder
- Michael Bilton as MC councillor
- Gerry Crampton as Kosho opponent
- Fenella Fielding as Announcer (voice only)
- Angelo Muscat as Butler

== Production ==
According to the documentary Don't Knock Yourself Out, produced for the 2007 DVD reissue of The Prisoner in the UK (and included in the DVD/Blu-ray edition released in North America in October 2009), production of this episode was impacted by behind-the-scenes tension. Interviewed in the documentary, actors Annette Andre and Mark Eden both recall McGoohan and the director entering into a shouting match during filming (Andre strongly criticises McGoohan for this behaviour). Eden recalls McGoohan losing control and nearly strangling him during a fight scene. Nesbitt, also interviewed for the programme, indicates that he was never given any information regarding what the yet-to-be-broadcast series was about, and thus played New Number Two in a state of confusion. Andre ends her comments by stating she did not enjoy her time on the programme, while a crew member expresses his belief that McGoohan, under creative pressure, experienced a nervous breakdown during the filming of this episode.

== Broadcast ==
The broadcast date of the episode varied in different ITV regions of the UK. The episode was first shown at 7:30pm on Friday 8 December 1967 on ATV Midlands and Grampian Television, on Friday 15 December on Anglia Television, on Sunday 17 December on ATV London, whose broadcasts were also taken up by Southern Television, Westward Television and Tyne-Tees; on Thursday 21 December on Scottish Television, on Thursday 28 December on Border Television and on Friday 5 January 1968 on Granada Television in the North West. The aggregate viewing figures for the ITV regions that debuted the season in 1967 have been estimated at 9.3 million. In Northern Ireland, the episode did not debut until Saturday 9 March 1968, and in Wales, the episode was not broadcast until Wednesday 11 March 1970.

== Sources ==
- Fairclough, Robert, ed. (February 2006). The Prisoner: The Original Scripts. Vol. 2. foreword by Roger Parkes. Reynolds & Hearn. ISBN 978-1-903111-81-9. OCLC 61145235. – script of episode
