= Roger Woddis =

British writer and humorous poet (1917 – 1993)

Roger Woddis (17 May 1917 – 16 July 1993) was a British writer and humorous poet. One of his most famous poems, Ethics for Everyman, deals with the double-morality of ethical principles.

== Early life ==
Woddis was born in May 1917 in London, England.

== Career ==
Woddis worked at the Little Unity Theatre in King's Cross during the 1930s and 1940s.

His early writing career included some involvement with Unity Theatre, London, where he contributed material to a number of revues.

His poetry featured regularly in Radio Times and other periodicals in the 1970s. During much of the 1980s and early '90s, he had his own weekly poem in the humour magazine Punch: titled "Subverse". This consisted each week of a humorously subversive political poem, often dealing with recent events. He was also New Statesman's weekly poet from 1970 until months before his death, following in the footsteps of 'Macflecknoe'; 'Sagittarius' (Olga Katzin); and Reginald Reynolds; and succeeded by Bill Greenwell.

He wrote a mildly humorous column in the Radio Times called "Woddis On".

His poems featured topics such as the Vietnam war, miners strikes, and apartheid.

He also wrote for television, including an episode of The Prisoner ("Hammer into Anvil", 1967) which is generally considered the most literate episode of the series: several pieces of classical music figure are used in the plot, where one character quotes Goethe in the original German, and another character quotes from Don Quixote in the original Spanish. He also wrote episodes for the Armchair Theatre and Churchill's People.

Much of Woddis's writing was openly sympathetic to leftist political causes, including communism. Woddis's obituary in The Times confirmed that he had been a member of the Communist Party of Great Britain.

His poems include Ethics for Everyman and Down with Fanatics. His collections include 'Lot 71' (1971), 'Sex Guyed' (with Arthur Horner, 1973), 'The Woddis Collection' (1978), 'God's Worried' (1983), 'Funny Old World' (with Steve Bell, 1991), and the posthumous 'One Over The Eighties' (1994).

He also recorded The Elephant Song in 1975.

== Personal life ==
Woddis was married to Joan Hobson and they had two children; they later divorced.
