= Frank Maher (stuntman) =

British stuntman (1929–2007)

Francis James "Frank" Maher (18 June 1929 – 13 July 2007) was a British stuntman who was best known for his roles as a stuntman or stunt coordinator in many British television shows including Danger Man (US: Secret Agent) and The Prisoner; he was frequently the stunt double for the series star Patrick McGoohan.

== Early career ==
He was born in London on 18 June 1929. He was a gold medal-winning boxer at school. Before his career as a stuntman/actor, he served in World War II in the Parachute Regiment of the British Army. He lied about his age to join the regiment which meant that he was only 15 when he took part in the battle of Arnhem (part of Operation Market Garden).

His first stunt role was as a Roman Centurion in the film Caesar And Cleopatra (1945) starring Stewart Granger. His other movie stunt roles included work on The Crimson Pirate (1952) doubling for Burt Lancaster and as a riding double in The Devil’s Disciple (1959).

His later movie stunt roles included work on The Italian Job in 1969.

== TV stuntman ==
As a stuntman on The Avengers, he played opposite both Honor Blackman and Diana Rigg. After working on Man in a Suitcase, he became stunt coordinator on Department S and Randall and Hopkirk (Deceased).

Following his work on Danger Man, he again doubled for Patrick McGoohan in the TV series The Prisoner (1967–68). He had a particularly large role in the episode "The Schizoid Man", which required a doppelganger of McGoohan's Number Six character to have a lot of screen time alongside the "real" Number Six.

He also appeared as "Third Gunman" in The Prisoner western/cowboy style episode "Living in Harmony". He claimed to have suggested the idea of having a western/cowboy style episode to McGoohan.

Maher also served as a stuntman / stunt coordinator / stunt arranger on a number of other TV programmes, including: Blake's 7, The Persuaders!, The Champions, Robin Hood, The Saint and Space 1999.

On The Saint (1962–69), he replaced Les Crawford as Roger Moore's double. Moore nicknamed him "Mrs Maher" because of his very careful planning of each stunt sequence.

He also worked as the fight arranger in the first of the BBC Northern Ireland Billy Plays "Too Late to Talk to Billy" in 1982, in which Billy was played by Kenneth Branagh.

== Author and writer ==
In the late 1970s, he co-wrote several novels in the thriller genre including The Capricorn Run (also known as The Hook) in 1978, Wipe-Out! in 1980 and Sahara Strike in 1980.

He also wrote action sequences for films, including Die Hard.

== Family ==
He married four times. His first marriage was to actress Dilys Laye. He had one son, Gary, and one daughter, Stephanie, with his second wife Jackie, who was a dancer.

== Death ==
He died on 13 July 2007 at St Mary's Hospital in Newport on the Isle of Wight after a long period suffering from emphysema.

== Filmography ==
Year	Title	Role	Notes
1955	The Quatermass Xperiment	P.C. Evans	Uncredited
1956	Up in the World	Policeman	Uncredited
1957	Town on Trial	Crime Scene Spectator	Uncredited
1957	Blue Murder at St. Trinian's	Soldier	Uncredited
1963	The Cracksman		
1964	Children of the Damned	Detective	Uncredited
1966	Daleks' Invasion Earth 2150 A.D.	Robber #2	Uncredited
1967	Casino Royale	Man in Casino	Uncredited
1968	The Fiction-Makers	Rip Savage	
1972	Innocent Bystanders	Daniel	
1977	Sweeney!	Policeman	Uncredited
1980	North Sea Hijack	Assault Team	Uncredited
1980	Superman II	Man in Street	Uncredited
