= Hammer into Anvil =

- The Prisoner episode
- Episode no.: Series 1 Episode 10
- Directed by: Pat Jackson
- Written by: Roger Woddis
- Production code: 12
- Original air date: 1 December 1967

Guest appearance
- Patrick Cargill

Episode chronology
← Previous "Checkmate"	Next → "It's Your Funeral"

"Hammer into Anvil" is an episode of the allegorical British science fiction TV series The Prisoner. Written by Roger Woddis and directed by Pat Jackson, it was the twelfth episode produced. It was the tenth episode to be broadcast in the UK on ITV (ATV Midlands and Grampian) on Friday 1 December 1967 and first aired in the United States on CBS on Saturday 31 August 1968.

The episode stars Patrick McGoohan as Number Six and features Patrick Cargill as Number Two. The central themes of this episode are insecurity, paranoia, and conspiracy thinking in a leader.

== Plot summary ==
Number Two interrogates a stubborn female prisoner, Number Seventy-Three, in the Village Hospital, about her operative husband; attempting to torment her with photographic evidence of said husband's infidelity. Frustrated, he attacks her; she screams, and Number Six rushes to her aid. In the commotion, she leaps from her bed and kills herself by jumping out of the first-floor window. Six swears to Two that he will pay for his cruelty.

Two forcibly has Six brought to the Green Dome and the two begin a war of nerves. Two quotes Goethe: Du mußt Amboß oder Hammer sein ("You must be Anvil or Hammer"). "And you see me as the anvil?" asks Six, to which Two answers, "Precisely. I am going to hammer you." Already aware that he is being watched by the Village's hidden camera and spies at every turn, Six proceeds to act in a highly suspicious manner, as if he were some sort of spy or double agent. He takes six copies of the same record of Bizet's L'Arlésienne suite (composed from incidental music to a play about a man driven to suicide by having learned of his lover's infidelity - referenced in the soundtrack throughout the episode) at the music store and plays them, eyeing his watch. He then writes out a message, that Number Fourteen retrieves a copy of, which claims to be from "D-6" to "XO4." Two is convinced that Six is a plant.

Two and Fourteen follow Six to where he drops a document in the cabin of the stone boat. They retrieve it, but the pages are all blank. After having them tested, Two suspects the technician of working with Six. Six then goes to place an ad (a quotation from Don Quixote) in the next issue of the Tally Ho. He then calls the head of Psychiatrics, posing as a superior who wants a report on Two's mental state. Two monitors the call and starts to become more paranoid at the behaviour of Six and those around him. Later, Six asks the town band to play the Farandole from the same Bizet piece, and when the band starts playing, he promptly leaves so that he is not around to hear it. He leaves a message to be read on the radio, wishing himself a happy birthday, with the sender listed as the deceased Number 113.

Two becomes increasingly agitated, wishing he could get away with killing Six. Fourteen offers to do so, making it appear an accident, and challenges Six to a game of "kosho" – a Japanese, trampoline-based contact sport – but is unable to "accidentally" drown his opponent. Six leaves a cuckoo clock in front of Two's door, causing him to panic and summon a bomb squad. Six captures a pigeon, attaches a message to its leg and sets it free in the woods. The bird is intercepted by Two's forces, and Two sees that the message states that Six will send a visual signal the next morning. Six goes to the beach and sends a visual signal (in light-flash Morse code) – a nursery rhyme with no apparent hidden meaning, all witnessed by Two.

Later, Six is able to trick Two into believing that Fourteen is conspiring against him. When the other keepers of the village cannot discern the hidden meaning in Six's messages, Two suspects everyone working for him of being part of a conspiracy. Fourteen fights with Six, who throws him out of a window. In the end, Six confronts an unnerved and agitated Two, who expresses the belief that Six is really "D-6", a man sent by "XO4" to test his security. Feeding on Two's paranoia, Six charges Two with treason: if Two's belief was true, then he would be duty-bound not to interfere. At Six's suggestion, Two calls the hotline to Number One to report his own failures and ask that he be replaced.

== Cast ==
- Patrick Cargill as Number Two
- Victor Maddern as Band Master
- Basil Hoskins as Number Fourteen
- Norman Scace as Psychiatric director
- Derek Aylward as New supervisor
- Hilary Dwyer as Number Seventy-Three
- Arthur Gross as Control room supervisor
- Peter Swanwick as Supervisor
- Victor Woolf as Shop assistant
- Michael Segal as Laboratory technician
- Margo Andrew as Shop kiosk girl
- Susan Sheers as Female code expert
- Jackie Cooper, Fred Haggerty, Eddie Powell, George Leech as Guardians

== Broadcast ==
The broadcast date of the episode varied in different ITV regions of the UK. The episode was first shown at 7:30pm on Friday 1 December 1967 on ATV Midlands and Grampian Television, on Friday 8 December on Anglia Television, on Sunday 10 December on ATV London, whose broadcasts were also taken up by Southern Television, Westward Television and Tyne-Tees; on Thursday 14 December on Scottish Television, on Thursday 21 December on Border Television and on Friday 29 December on Granada Television in the North West. The aggregate viewing figures for the ITV regions that debuted the season in 1967 have been estimated at 9.1 million. In Northern Ireland, the episode did not debut until Saturday 9 March 1968, and in Wales, the episode was not broadcast until Wednesday 11 March 1970.

== Sources ==
- Fairclough, Robert, ed. (February 2006). The Prisoner: The Original Scripts. Vol. 2. foreword by Roger Parkes. Reynolds & Hearn. ISBN 978-1-903111-81-9. OCLC 61145235. – script of episode
