= The Elephant Song (song) =

Single by Kamahl
- B-side: "Daisy a Day"
- Released: 1975
- Songwriters: Roger Woddis, Gregor Frenkel-Frank, Hans van Hemert

Kamahl singles chronology
"Our Love Song" (1975)	"The Elephant Song" (1975)	"Before You There Was Nothing" (1981)

"The Elephant Song" is a song written by Roger Woddis, Gregor Frenkel-Frank and Hans van Hemert. It was recorded by Kamahl in 1975, becoming a major hit song. The song became an anthem for the World Wildlife Fund.

As of August 1978, "The Elephant Song" was the highest-selling record in the history of Sweden.

== Lyrics ==
The song is about an elephant who tries to warn people to stop killing animals. During a parlando the elephant delivers his message that "man and beast must work together", and "together (...) will survive".

== Personnel ==
- Kamahl - vocals

== Charts ==
=== Weekly charts ===
Chart (1975)	Peak position
Belgium (Ultratop 50 Flanders)	1
Belgium (Ultratop 50 Wallonia)	15
Netherlands (Dutch Top 40)	1
Netherlands (Single Top 100)	1
New Zealand (Recorded Music NZ)	38

=== Year-end charts ===
Chart (1975)	Position
Belgium (Ultratop Flanders)	7
Netherlands (Dutch Top 40)	2
Netherlands (Single Top 100)	2

== Certifications ==
Region	Certification	Certified units/sales
Netherlands (NVPI)	Gold	100,000^{^}
^{^} Shipments figures based on certification alone.
