= Zena Walker =

English actress (1934–2003)

- Walker in The Marked One (1963)
- Born: Zena Cecilia Walker; 7 March 1934; Birmingham, England
- Died: 24 August 2003 (aged 69); Brockenhurst, Hampshire, England
- Occupation: Actress
- Years active: 1950–2003
- Spouses: Robert Urquhart (m. 1956, divorced) Julian Holloway (m. 1971, divorced) John French (m. 1979; died 2003)
- Children: 2

Zena Cecilia Walker (7 March 1934 – 24 August 2003) was an English actress in film, theatre and television.

== Biography ==
Walker was born in the Selly Oak district of Birmingham, the daughter of George Walker, a grocer, and his wife Elizabeth Louise (née Hammond). She attended St. Martin's School in Solihull, and then went on to train at the Royal Academy of Dramatic Art.

She debuted in 1950 in the Birmingham production of Smooth-faced Gentleman

She appeared twice in the TV series The Adventures of Robin Hood, the second time in the 1958 episode "Women's War".

In 1960, she starred in a TV adaptation of A. J. Cronin's novel The Citadel.

Her most memorable performance is considered that of a mother in A Day in the Death of Joe Egg (1969), a black comedy by Peter Nichols, adapted from his stage play, about a disabled child. For her performance in A Day in the Death of Joe Egg on Broadway, Walker won the 1968 Tony Award for Best Performance by a Featured Actress in a Play.

She was notable for playing Janet Portland the fiancee' of John Drake The Prisoner Number Six in the episode Do Not Forsake Me Oh My Darling of The Prisoner.

She was a memorable Ophelia in Hamlet (opposite Paul Scofield in the title role), and appeared as Her Ladyship in the film version of Ronald Harwood's play The Dresser (1983). Between 1970 and 1972, she appeared in the television series Man at the Top as Susan Lampton. She had a small role in the first series of New Tricks, playing Mrs Dubrovsky.

Walker married three times. Her first two husbands were actors: Robert Urquhart, with whom she had two children, and later Julian Holloway. Her third husband was John French, a theatrical agent, who survived her. She died in 2003 in Brockenhurst, Hampshire, aged 69, from undisclosed causes. Her last role was as the messenger in Oedipus.

== Filmography ==
| Year | Title | Role | Notes |
|---|---|---|---|
| 1960 | Danger Tomorrow | Ginny | |
| 1960 | Snowball | Mary Donovan | |
| 1961 | The Hellions | Julie Hargis | |
| 1962 | Emergency | Joan Bell | |
| 1962 | The Traitors | Annette Lane | |
| 1963 | Sammy Going South | Aunt Jane | |
| 1963 | Girl in the Headlines | Mildred Birkett | |
| 1963 | The Marked One | Kay Mason | |
| 1964 | Troubled Waters | Janet Carswell | |
| 1964 | Daylight Robbery | | |
| 1965 | Change Partners | Anna Arkwright | Edgar Wallace Mysteries |
| 1965 | Public Eye | Jean Lawford | Episode: "You Have to Draw the Line Somewhere" |
| 1967 | The Prisoner | Janet Portland | Episode: "Do Not Forsake Me Oh My Darling" |
| 1968 | Journey to the Unknown | Carrie Clark | Episode: "Girl of My Dreams" |
| 1969 | The Last Shot You Hear | Eileen Forbes | |
| 1970 | The Reckoning | Hilda Greening | |
| 1970 | Callan | Lady Lewis | Episode: "Suddenly-At Home" |
| 1970 | Cromwell | Mrs. Cromwell | |
| 1970 | Man at the Top (TV series) | Susan Lampton | Full series (1970-1972) |
| 1971 | One of Those Things | Mrs. Vinther | |
| 1971 | The Chairman's Wife | Margaret Howe | Short |
| 1973 | Country Matters | Mrs. Davenport | Episode: ″The Four Beauties″ |
| 1976 | The Likely Lads | Laura Windsor | |
| 1983 | The Dresser | Her Ladyship | |
| 1993 | Poirot | Vanda Chevenix | Episode: "Dead Man's Mirror" |
