= Journey Out of Darkness =

- Directed by: James Trainor
- Written by: Howard E. Koch; James Trainor
- Produced by: Frank Brittain
- Starring: Konrad Matthaei; Ed Devereaux; Kamahl
- Cinematography: Andrew Fraser
- Edited by: Bronwyn Fackerell; James Trainor
- Music by: Bob Young
- Production company: Australian-American Pictures
- Distributed by: British Empire Films
- Release date: October 1967
- Running time: 92 minutes
- Country: Australia
- Language: English

Journey Out of Darkness is a 1967 Australian film which was directed by James Trainor and one of the leads of the film was singer Kamahl.

== Plot ==
In 1901, trooper Peterson is sent to the Australian Outback to arrest an Aboriginal man responsible for a ritual killing. He is accompanied by tracker Jubbal. On the way back Jubbal is killed, and Peterson and the prisoner form a relationship.

== Cast ==
- Konrad Matthaei as Peterson
- Ed Devereaux as Jubbal
- Kamahl as prisoner
- Ron Morse as Sergeant Miller
- Marie Clark as Mrs Miller
- Betty Campbell as Jubbal's wife
- John Campbell as first child
- Don Campbell as second child
- Julie Williams as Aboriginal girl
- Nukitjilpi as chief
- Roy Dadaynga as tribesman
- the Arnhem Land Dancers from the Yirrkala Mission

== Production ==
Director James Trainor had worked at the Commonwealth Film Unit and worked in the United States as a documentary director. He wrote the script with his father-in-law, noted Hollywood screenwriter Howard E. Koch. Konrad Matthaei agreed to help finance the film if he was allowed to play the lead role.

Kamahl, a popular singer, was cast in a lead role. White actor Ed Devereaux was cast as an Aboriginal character. "If the producers had had the time they undoubtedly would have cast about for an Aboriginal actor," said Devereaux. "But they had to have a man with experience, for there could be no delay - we shot this film fast and furious."

Filming began in January 1967 and took place in Outback Australia and at the studios of Supreme Sound. Location filming took six weeks.

== Release ==
The film had its world premiere in Canberra at a screening that was attended by the Governor General Lord Casey and the Prime Minister Harold Holt (it was one of the last functions attended by Holt prior to his drowning). However its commercial response was disappointing.

Filmink magazine later wrote "It has its heart in the right place, albeit in a ‘50s Hollywood liberal way...but is fatally compromised by the casting of Sri Lankan Kamahl and white Ed Devereaux in blackface as aboriginals, not to mention Konrad Matthaei being simply dull in the lead. The film’s main problem is structural – there is no urgency in the trip and nothing interesting happens on the way. Once you stop laughing at Devereaux, it’s just boring."
