= A Change of Mind =

- The Prisoner episode
- Episode no.: Series 1 Episode 12
- Directed by: Patrick McGoohan
- Written by: Roger Parkes
- Production code: 9
- Original air date: 15 December 1967

Guest appearances
- John Sharp; Angela Browne

Episode chronology
| ← Previous "It's Your Funeral" | Next → "Do Not Forsake Me Oh My Darling" |

"A Change of Mind" is an episode of the allegorical British science fiction TV series The Prisoner. It was written by Roger Parkes and directed by Patrick McGoohan and ninth produced. It was the twelfth episode to be broadcast in the UK on ITV (ATV Midlands and Grampian) on Friday 15 December 1967 and first aired in the United States on CBS on Saturday 24 August 1968.

The episode stars Patrick McGoohan as Number Six and features John Sharp as Number Two. Themes explored include coerced confessions and political control via drugs; also conformity, methods of enforcing it, and the consequences of its rejection.

== Plot summary ==
Number Six pursues his daily exercise routine in the woods. Two young toughs arrive and accuse him of being anti-social for not using the community gym and a fight ensues, in which Number Six prevails. In an anteroom to the Council Chamber, a Villager desperately confesses to being "inadequate and anti-social"; he is applauded by others for this admission. Number Six is invited into the committee chamber to confess his lack of cooperation, but sarcastically declines to do so.

The Village newspaper, the Tally Ho, reports that Number Six is due for "further investigation". Number Two denies having any influence over the committee but warns of the consequences of non-compliance. Number Eighty-Six, an attractive female, chides Number Six for his non-cooperation.

Number Six's exposure of a community "rehab" process causes the committee to label him uncooperative. He is taken to the Hospital, where he encounters a Villager with a scar on his temple who says that he had been labelled as "unmutual", but is now cured. Number Six again appears before the committee and is told he will be labelled for "Instant Social Conversion" if he does not fall into line. He then reads in the Tally-Ho and hears over the public address system that he is officially "unmutual".

Next morning Number Six is thoroughly shunned, and Number Two threatens him again with Social Conversion, which is a sort of lobotomy. Number Six is attacked by the irate Villagers and marched to the Hospital. There he is strapped to a table and the Social Conversion process is explained to a Village television audience by Number Eighty-Six, who is the chief technician in charge. Drugged, Number Six is subjected to an ultra-sonic treatment which lobotomises him. At the last second, Number Eighty-Six shuts off the ultrasound.

Number Six wakes up, apparently docile, returns to the community, and is welcomed by all. In his flat he sees his cup of tea being drugged by Number Eighty-Six and pours it away. Number Two arrives and questions Number Six about his resignation, but is rebuffed. Number Two and Number Eighty-Six discuss Number Six and reveal that the "ultra-sonic" lobotomy was an intentional sham, meant to convince the subject (in conjunction with the drug) that he has been lobotomised. Number Eighty-Six, watching Number Six remove the dressing covering his "operation scar", doubts that he has been properly conditioned, but Number Two insists that all is well. She tries to drug Number Six again, but he takes over the tea-making process, switching the cups so that Number Eighty-Six drinks the drugged tea instead.

Back at the exercise site in the woods, the thugs again confront Number Six. He initially appears confused and unable to defend himself, but ultimately rallies and prevails. Number Eighty-Six, still intoxicated with the drug, is hypnotised by Number Six and explains how the conditioning process was faked; she is given undisclosed instructions by Number Six.

Number Six visits Number Two and convinces him that the ploy has worked, informing him that he wants to publicly confess to "everyone". Number Two arranges for the whole village to hear Number Six speak. The programmed Number Eighty-Six arrives on cue at the stroke of 4 o'clock and loudly charges Number Two with being "unmutual". The Villagers turn on Number Two, who is forced to flee through the Village streets.

== Cast ==
- John Sharp as Number Two
- Angela Browne as Number Eighty-Six
- George Pravda as Doctor
- Kathleen Breck as Number Forty-Two
- Peter Swanwick as Supervisor
- Thomas Heathcote as Lobo man
- Bartlett Mullins as Committee chairman
- Michael Miller as Number Ninety-Three
- Joseph Cuby as Social group member
- Michael Chow as Social group member
- June Ellis as Number Forty-Eight
- John Hamblin as Woodland man
- Michael Billington as Woodland man
- Fenella Fielding as Announcer (unseen)

== Broadcast ==
The broadcast date of the episode varied in different ITV regions of the UK. The episode was first shown at 7:30 p.m. on Friday 15 December 1967 on ATV Midlands and Grampian Television, on Friday 22 December on Anglia Television, on Thursday 28 December on Scottish Television, on Sunday 31 December on ATV London, whose broadcasts were also taken up by Southern Television, Westward Television and Tyne-Tees; this was two weeks after the previous episode "It's Your Funeral" due to The Prisoner not being considered suitable for broadcast on Christmas Eve. The episode was shown on Friday 5 January 1968 on Border Television (in a change from the previous Thursday broadcasts) and on Friday 12 January on Granada Television in the North West. The aggregate viewing figures for the ITV regions that debuted the season in 1967 have been estimated at 7.5 million. In Northern Ireland, the episode did not debut until Saturday 16 March 1968, and in Wales, the episode was not broadcast until Wednesday 18 March 1970.

== Sources ==
- White, Matthew; Jaffer Ali (1988). The Official Prisoner Companion. London: Sidgwick & Jackson. ISBN 0-283-99598-X.
- Fairclough, Robert, ed. (February 2006). The Prisoner: The Original Scripts. Vol. 2. foreword by Roger Parkes. Reynolds & Hearn. ISBN 978-1-903111-81-9. OCLC 61145235. – script of episode
