= André van Gyseghem =

British actor (1906–1979)

André van Gyseghem (18 August 1906 – 13 October 1979) was an English actor and theatre director who also appeared in many British television programmes.

== Early life ==
Van Gyseghem was born on 18 August 1906 in Eltham, Kent, the son of Georges Emil van Gyseghem and his wife Minnie Evison (née Offord). He went to school in Greenwich, then studied for the stage at RADA. He worked initially in a music-publishing business.

He made his stage debut at the Theatre Royal, Bognor, in September 1927, as Peveril Leyburn in The Constant Nymph, then in January 1928 toured as Lewis Dodd in the same play. From September 1928 to July 1930 he was engaged at the Hull Repertory Theatre, then under the direction of A.R. Whatmore, playing a round of leading juvenile parts.

== Return to London ==
At the 4Arts Theatre in July 1930 he played Vitek in The Macropulos Secret. He then joined the repertory company at the Embassy Theatre, and remained there from September 1930 until October 1934. He continued to take parts in plays, such as Florindo in The Liar and Master Klaus in The Witch, but also began his long career as director, starting with the Agatha Christie play Black Coffee in December 1930.

Other subsequent productions which he directed at the Embassy included:

- Miracle at Verdun by Hans Chlumberg, September 1932
- The Glass Wall (premiere), by E. M. Delafield, February 1933
- All God's Chillun Got Wings, March 1933, with Paul Robeson and Flora Robson
- The Brontes of Haworth Parsonage, November 1933
- Windfall by R. C. Sherriff, February 1934
- Stevedore, May 1935, with Paul Robeson and Robert Adams

Between 1933 and 1935 he made several trips to the Soviet Union, including a year's work at Nikolay Okhlopkov's Realistic Theatre in Moscow. He attributed much of his own acting expertise to the education he received there. He became a member of the Communist Party and president of the Unity Theatre's "Management Committee".

In 1939 he appeared in a short BBC television play Rehearsal for a Drama. In 1944 played Cecil Tempest in the film Candles at Nine, and in 1949 Oblensky in Warning to Wantons. In 1953 he played the Stage Door Keeper in The Limping Man. Between 1951 and his death in 1979 he appeared in over 50 British television dramas. These included in 1963 as Vennekohl in Rudolph Cartier's production of Stalingrad for the BBC's Festival series. He appeared in The Adventures of William Tell as the Grand Duke in episode 24, "The Ensign". He also appeared in several episodes of the TV series Crown Court as the presiding Judge Mr. Justice Barclay.

In the 1960s, Van Gyseghem was one of several actors to portray Number Two on the cult classic television series The Prisoner. He portrayed the retiring Number Two in the December 1967 episode "It's Your Funeral". Van Gyseghem also appeared in an episode of The Saint in 1968 with Roger Moore.

== Personal life ==
He married actress Jean Forbes-Robertson in 1940. Actress Joanna Van Gyseghem is their daughter.

== Filmography ==
Year	Title	Role	Notes
1944	Candles at Nine	Cecil Tempest	
1949	Warning to Wantons	Oblensky	
1949	Stop Press Girl	Ex-Editor of Evening Comet	uncredited
1953	The Limping Man	Stage Door Keeper	
1957	Face in the Night	Bank Manager	
1957	The Surgeon's Knife	Mr. Dodds	
1959	The House of the Seven Hawks	Hotel Clerk	
1965	Rotten to the Core	Field Marshal von Schneer	
1965	For Whom the Bell Tolls	Karkov	TV series
1970	Cromwell	Archbishop Rinucinni	
1972	The Pied Piper	Friar	
1979	Prince Regent	Lord Liverpool	

== Publication ==
- André van Gyseghem (1943). Theatre in Soviet Russia. London: Faber and Faber Ltd.
