= Eric Mival =

Welsh film & music editor and director (1939–2025)

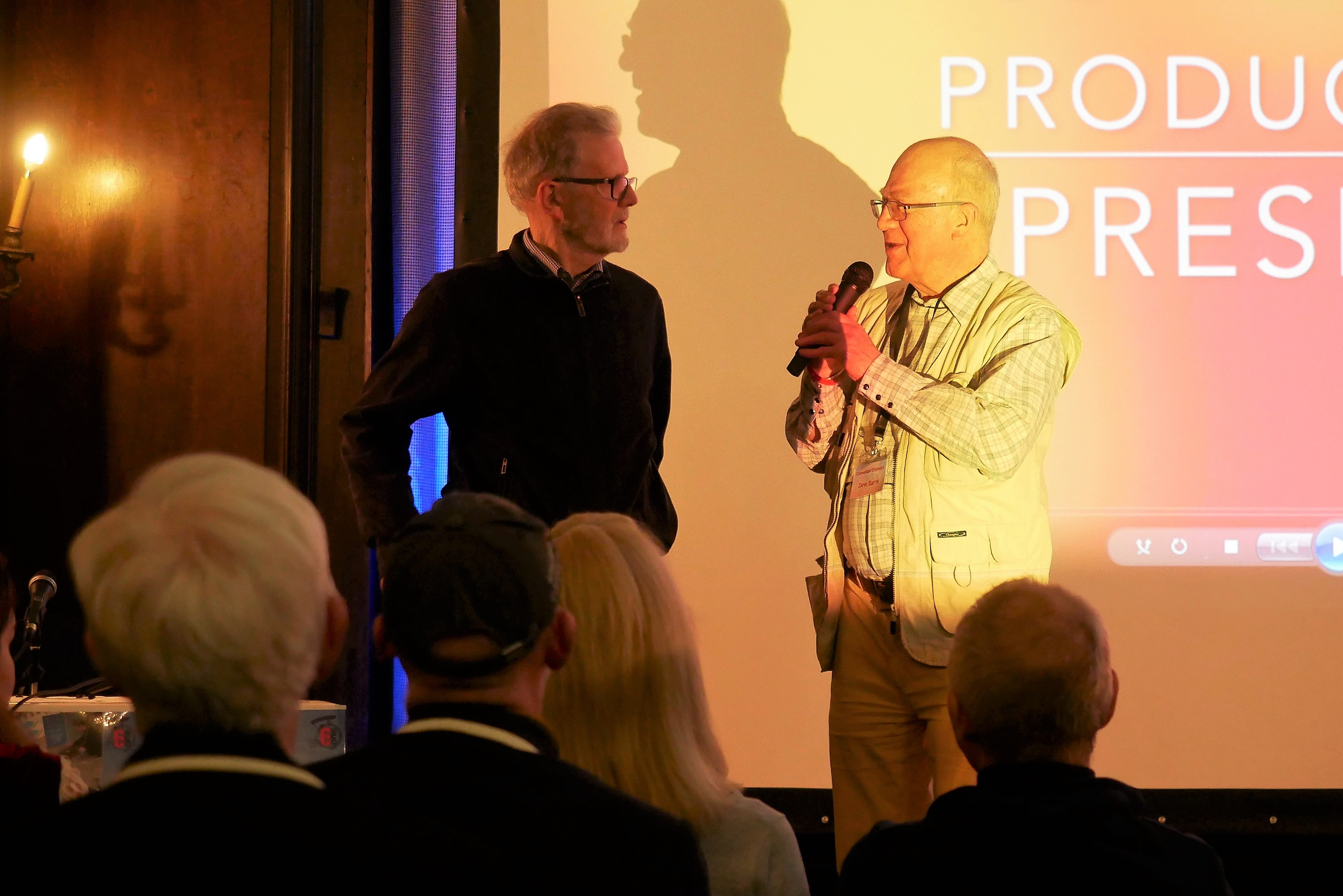
- Eric Mival (left) interviewed by Six of One organizer Dave Barrie - 2019
- Born: 18 July 1939; Rhyl, Denbighshire, Wales
- Died: 27 August 2025 (aged 86)
- Occupations: Film editor, director, and music editor
- Notable work: The Prisoner, Strange Report, Top of the Pops, Doctor Who

Eric Mival (18 July 1939 – 27 August 2025) was a Welsh film editor, director, and music editor.

Mival started his career in films and television working in editing roles on several TV programmes and feature films before becoming a BBC film editor. He is now a film and television writer/director/producer, who has worked on a wide range of both drama and documentary, broadcast and non-broadcast TV programmes.

== Early work ==
He was the music editor on 13 episodes of the TV series The Prisoner recorded in 1966/67, having been an assistant film editor on the first four episodes. He has also been a film editor on a number of TV shows including: Strange Report, Top of the Pops, Doctor Who, Comedy Playhouse, The Wednesday Play, and the Oscar nominated short film Oisin.

While working on The Prisoner he was asked, along with a number of other cast and crew, to work up a storyline or script for the series. He then wrote two synopsis entitled "Ticket to Eternity" and "Friend or Foe" that were never actually filmed but are included in Volume One of the two-volume collection of series scripts edited by Robert Fairclough and published by Reynolds and Hearn in 2005 and 2006.

== Educational TV work ==
Much of his recent work has been on educational television. He wrote, produced and directed the television series We Can Work It Out, an educational series for parents about managing child behaviour. He has also written and directed, educational, training and promotional programmes for a number of large companies (such as Sainsburys and BT) and a number of UK government departments and organisations.

He wrote, directed and produced The Learning Bug, a 6-part series of documentaries to help parents of 5- to 7-year-old children. He was the writer and director of Jolly Phonics, an eight-part puppet TV series teaching children to read using the phonics approach. Jolly Phonics won the “Teachers Choice” award at the US Education Media Awards in 1997. He was also both writer and director of a number of BBC schools TV programmes, including Words and Pictures, You & Me, and Watch.

== Other TV work ==
He directed documentary TV programmes for what was then Central Television in the UK including: Directing Parents and Teenagers an eight-part series dealing with teenage/parental relationships which used filmed documentary and studio drama, and directing/writing England Their England, a series of three 25-minute documentaries on film about an NSPCC nursery, a feminist poet and a Birmingham black pop/dance group, who recorded in France.

He also directed a series of dramatised community service adverts on the themes of drugs and alcohol for the UK's Anglia Television TV station.

In 1978 he directed a report for the BBC TV series Film 78 on the Australian film industry. The report featured the works of directors Bruce Beresford, Fred Schepisi and Peter Weir.

== Autobiography ==
In 2015 Mival's memoirs Cutting Edge: My Life in Films and Television was published in hardback and paperback editions by Quoit Media Limited. ISBN 978-1-911537-02-1 (hardback) and ISBN 978-1-911537-00-7 (paperback).
