= The Prisoner =

British science fiction television series (1967–1968)

- Genre: Spy-fi; Psychological drama
- Created by: Patrick McGoohan
- Directed by: Patrick McGoohan; Pat Jackson; Don Chaffey; David Tomblin
- Starring: Patrick McGoohan
- Theme music composer: Ron Grainer
- Composers: Albert Elms; Wilfred Josephs; Robert Farnon; Paul Bonneau etc.
- Country of origin: United Kingdom
- Original language: English
- No. of series: 1
- No. of episodes: 17 (list of episodes)

Production
- Executive producer: Patrick McGoohan
- Producer: David Tomblin
- Production locations: MGM-British Studios, Borehamwood; Portmeirion, Wales
- Running time: 50 minutes
- Production companies: Everyman Films; ITC Entertainment

Original release
- Network: ATV (ITV)
- Release: 29 September 1967 – 1 February 1968

Related
- The Prisoner (2009 miniseries)

The Prisoner is a British television series created by Patrick McGoohan, who stars as Number Six, a nameless British intelligence agent who is abducted and imprisoned in a mysterious coastal village after resigning from his position. The allegorical plotlines of the series contain elements of science fiction, psychological drama, and spy fiction. It was produced by Everyman Films for distribution by Lew Grade's ITC Entertainment.

A single series of 17 episodes was filmed between September 1966 and January 1968, with exterior location filming primarily taking place in the Welsh seaside village of Portmeirion. Interiors were filmed at MGM-British Studios in Borehamwood, Hertfordshire. The series was first broadcast in Canada beginning on 5 September 1967, in the UK on 29 September 1967, and in the United States on 1 June 1968.

Although the show was sold as a thriller in the mould of Danger Man (McGoohan's previous series), The Prisoner's surreal and Kafkaesque setting and reflection of concerns of the 1960s counterculture have had a far-reaching influence on popular culture and the series ultimately developed a cult following.

== Premise ==
The series follows an unnamed British intelligence agent (played by Patrick McGoohan) who, after abruptly and angrily resigning from his highly sensitive government job, prepares to go on a trip. While packing his luggage, he is rendered unconscious by knockout gas piped into his home in Westminster. Upon waking, he finds himself in a recreation of the interior of his home, located in a mysterious coastal settlement known to its residents as "the Village". The Village is surrounded by mountains on three sides and the sea on the other. The agent is then informed that he will be referred to as "Number Six" instead of by his own name.

In subsequent episodes, Number Six becomes acquainted with the residents, hundreds of people from all walks of life and cultures, all seeming to be peacefully and mostly enjoyably living out their lives. They do not use names, but have been assigned numbers, which, aside from designations such as Two, Three, and Six, give no clue as to their status within the Village. Most are captives, but some are guards. Prisoners, therefore, have no idea whom they can and cannot trust. The protagonist is assigned Number Six but refuses to accept the designation: "I am not a number! I am a free man!"

Although the residents can freely move about the Village, they are constantly under the surveillance of numerous high-tech monitoring systems and cannot leave. Security forces, including a balloon-shaped automaton called Rover, recapture or kill those who attempt to escape.

I will not make any deals with you. I've resigned. I will not be pushed, filed, stamped, indexed, briefed, debriefed, or numbered! My life is my own.

— Number Six in the first episode, "Arrival"

Number Six is a particularly important target of the constantly changing Number Two, the Village administrator, who acts as an agent for the unseen Number One. Number Two uses techniques such as hallucinogenic drugs, identity theft, mind control, dream manipulation and forms of social indoctrination and physical coercion in an attempt to make Number Six reveal why he resigned from his position. The position of Number Two is assigned to a different person in each episode, with two making repeat appearances. This is assumed to be part of a larger plan to disorient Number Six, but sometimes the change of personnel seems to be the result of the failure of the previous incumbent, whose fate is unknown.

Number Six, distrustful of everyone in the Village, refuses to co-operate or provide the answers they seek. He struggles, usually alone, with various goals, such as determining for which side of the Iron Curtain the Village functions, if either, remaining defiant to its imposed authority, concocting plans for escape, learning all he can about the Village, and subverting its operation. His schemes lead to the dismissals of the incumbent Number Two on several occasions. Despite foiling the system, Number Six never escapes. By the end of the series, the administration, becoming desperate for Number Six's knowledge, as well as fearful of his growing influence in the Village, takes drastic measures that threaten the lives of Number Six, Number Two, and the entire Village.

A major theme of the series is the conflict between individualism, as represented by Number Six, and collectivism, as represented by the Village. According to McGoohan, the series aimed to demonstrate a balance between the two ideologies.

== Cast ==
=== Main cast ===
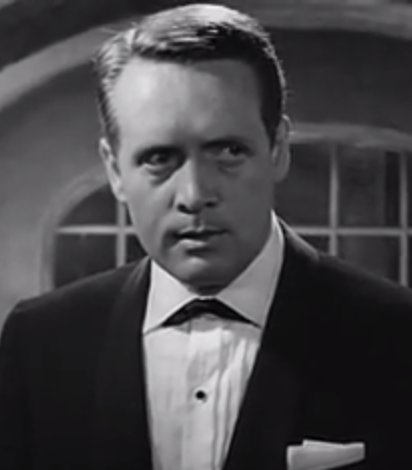
Patrick McGoohan (pictured in 1962) was the chief creative force behind The Prisoner, and also portrayed its lead role, Number Six.

- Patrick McGoohan as Number Six

=== Recurring cast ===
- Angelo Muscat as The Butler
- Peter Swanwick as Supervisor
- Denis Shaw as The Shop Keeper
- Fenella Fielding as The Announcer/Telephone Operator (voice only)

=== Number Two ===
The episodes featured guest stars in the role of Number Two.

- George Baker
- David Bauer
- Patrick Cargill
- Georgina Cookson
- Guy Doleman
- Clifford Evans
- Colin Gordon (two episodes)
- Kenneth Griffith
- Rachel Herbert
- Leo McKern (three episodes)
- Mary Morris
- Derren Nesbitt
- Eric Portman
- Robert Rietti (voice)
- Anton Rodgers
- John Sharp
- André van Gyseghem
- Peter Wyngarde

=== Guest cast ===
- Annette Andre
- Sheila Allen
- Niké Arrighi
- Michael Balfour
- Kenneth Benda
- Christopher Benjamin
- Michael Billington
- Michael Bilton
- Peter Bowles
- Angela Browne
- James Bree
- Michael Brennan
- Earl Cameron
- Annette Carrell
- John Castle
- Dennis Chinnery
- Michael Chow
- George Coulouris
- Rosalie Crutchley
- Finlay Currie
- Hilary Dwyer
- Paul Eddington
- Mark Eden
- Max Faulkner
- Ian Fleming
- Valerie French
- Nadia Gray
- Lucy Griffiths
- John Hamblin
- Basil Hoskins
- Peter Howell
- Patricia Jessel
- Alf Joint
- Alexis Kanner
- Katherine Kath
- Gertan Klauber
- Lloyd Lamble
- Jon Laurimore
- George Leech
- Charles Lloyd-Pack
- Justine Lord
- Duncan Macrae
- Victor Maddern
- Virginia Maskell
- John Maxim
- Betty McDowall
- Jane Merrow
- Martin Miller
- Norman Mitchell
- Aubrey Morris
- Bartlett Mullins
- David Nettheim
- Michael Nightingale
- Frederick Piper
- George Pravda
- Keith Pyott
- Ronald Radd
- Hugo Schuster
- Donald Sinden
- Patsy Smart
- Nigel Stock
- Kevin Stoney
- Larry Taylor
- Wanda Ventham
- Zena Walker
- Norma West
- Alan White

McGoohan was the only actor credited during the opening sequence, with Muscat the only actor considered a co-star of the series. Several actors (including Alexis Kanner, Christopher Benjamin and Georgina Cookson) appeared in more than one episode playing different characters. Frank Maher, McGoohan's stunt double, who is seen running across the beach in the title sequence, also appears extensively in "The Schizoid Man" and in "Living in Harmony".

== Episodes ==
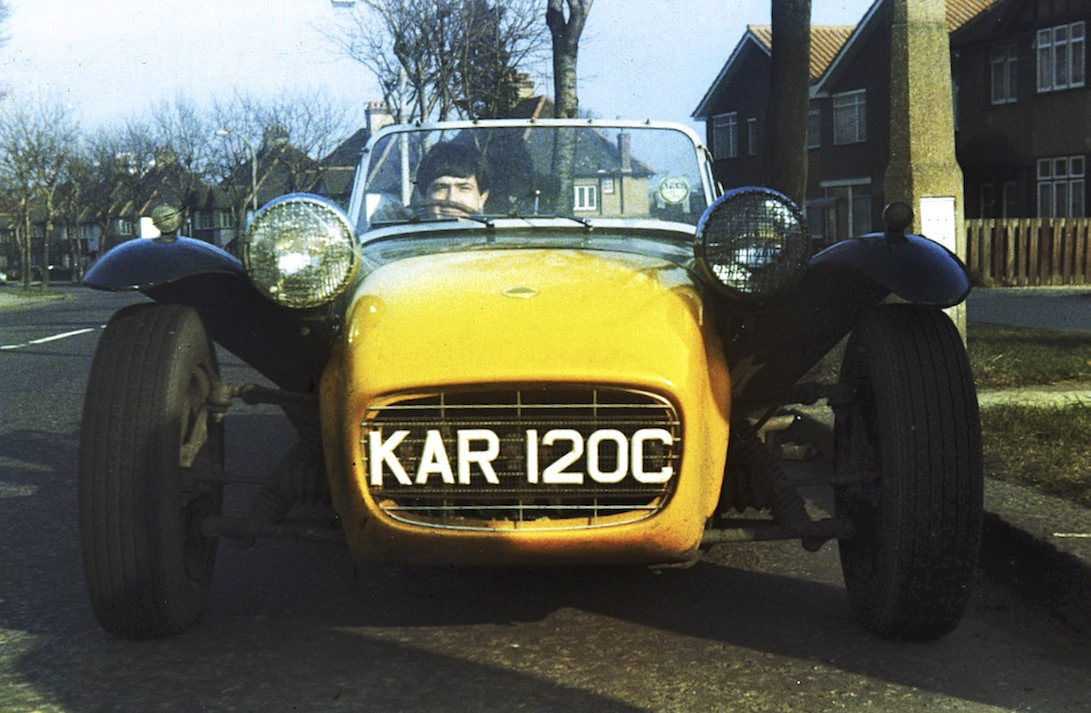
Number Six's Lotus Seven Series II, as seen in the title sequence

The Prisoner consists of 17 episodes, which were first broadcast from 29 September 1967 to 1 February 1968 in the United Kingdom. While the show was presented as a serialised work, with a clear beginning and end, the ordering of the intermediate episodes is unclear, as the production and original broadcast order were different. Several attempts have been made to create an episode ordering based on script and production notes and interpretations of the broader narrative of Number Six's time in the Village.

=== Opening and closing sequences ===
The opening and closing sequences of The Prisoner have become iconic, cited as "one of the great set-ups of genre drama", by establishing the Orwellian and postmodern themes of the series. The high production values of the opening sequence have been described as more like those of a feature film than a television programme.

== Production ==
=== Development ===
The Prisoner was created while Patrick McGoohan and George Markstein were working on Danger Man, an espionage show produced by Incorporated Television Company. The exact details of who created which aspects of the show are disputed, as there is no "created by" credit. Majority opinion credits McGoohan as the sole creator of the series, but a disputed co-creator status was later ascribed to Markstein after a series of fan interviews were published in the 1980s.

Some sources indicate that McGoohan was the sole or primary creator of the show. McGoohan stated in a 1977 interview that, during the filming of the third series of Danger Man, he told ITC Entertainment managing director Lew Grade that he wanted to quit working on Danger Man after the filming of the proposed fourth series. Grade was unhappy with the decision, but when McGoohan insisted upon quitting, Grade asked if McGoohan had any other possible projects, and McGoohan later pitched The Prisoner. In a 1988 article in British telefantasy magazine Time Screen, though, McGoohan indicated that he had planned to pitch The Prisoner before speaking with Grade.

In both accounts, McGoohan pitched the idea orally, rather than having Grade read the proposal in detail, and the two made an oral agreement for the show to be produced by Everyman Films, the production company formed by McGoohan and David Tomblin. In the 1977 account, McGoohan said that Grade approved of the show despite not understanding it, whereas, in the 1988 account, Grade expressed clear support for the concept.

Other sources credit Markstein, then a script editor for Danger Man, with a significant or even primary portion of the development of the show. For example, Dave Rogers, in the book The Prisoner and Danger Man, said that Markstein claimed to have created the concept first and McGoohan later attempted to take credit for it, although Rogers himself doubted that McGoohan would have wanted or needed to do that.

In 1967, a four-page document, generally agreed to have been written by Markstein, setting out an overview of the themes of the series, was published as part of an ITC/ATV press book. It has usually been accepted that this text originated earlier as a guide for the series writers. Further doubt has been cast on Markstein's version of events by author Rupert Booth in his biography of McGoohan, entitled Not a Number. Booth points out that McGoohan had outlined the themes of The Prisoner in a 1965 interview, long before Markstein's tenure as script editor on the brief fourth series of Danger Man.

Part of Markstein's inspiration came from his research into the Second World War, where he found that some people had been incarcerated in a resort-like prison in Scotland called Inverlair Lodge, near Inverness. Markstein suggested that Danger Man's main character John Drake (played by McGoohan) could suddenly resign and be kidnapped and sent to such a location. McGoohan added Markstein's suggestion to material he had been working on, which later became The Prisoner. A 1960 episode of Danger Man entitled "View from the Villa" had exteriors filmed in Portmeirion, a Welsh resort village that struck McGoohan as a good location for future projects.

According to "Fantasy or Reality"—a chapter of The Prisoner of Portmeirion—the Village is based, in part, on "a strange place in Scotland" operated by the Inter-Services Research Bureau, wherein "people" with "valuable knowledge of one sort or another" were held prisoners on extended "holidays" in a "luxury prison camp". The Prisoner's story editor, George Markstein, this source contends, knows of "the existence of this 'secure establishment'". This "Scottish prison camp, in reality, was not, of course, a holiday-type village full of people wearing colourful clothing."

Further inspiration came from a Danger Man episode called "Colony Three", in which Drake infiltrates a spy school in Eastern Europe during the Cold War. The school, in the middle of nowhere, is set up to look like a normal English town in which pupils and instructors mix as in any other normal city, but the instructors are virtual prisoners with little hope of ever leaving. McGoohan also stated that he was influenced by his experience from theatre, including his work in the Orson Welles play Moby Dick—Rehearsed (1955) and in a BBC television play, The Prisoner by Bridget Boland.

McGoohan wrote a forty-page show bible, which included a "history of the Village, the sort of telephones they used, the sewerage system, what they ate, the transport, the boundaries, a description of the Village, every aspect of it." McGoohan wrote and directed several episodes, often using pseudonyms. Specifically, McGoohan wrote "Free for All" under the pen name Paddy Fitz (Paddy being the Irish diminutive for Patrick and Fitzpatrick being his mother's maiden name) and directed the episodes "Many Happy Returns" and "A Change of Mind" using the stage name Joseph Serf, the surname being ironically a word meaning a peasant who is under the control of a feudal master. Using his own name, McGoohan wrote and directed the last two episodes—"Once Upon a Time" and "Fall Out"—and directed "Free for All".

In a 1966 interview for the Los Angeles Times by reporter Robert Musel, McGoohan stated, "John Drake of Secret Agent is gone." Furthermore, McGoohan stated in a 1985 interview that Number Six is not the same character as John Drake, adding that he had originally wanted another actor to portray the character. Other sources indicate that several of the crew members who continued on from Danger Man to work on The Prisoner considered it to be a continuation, and that McGoohan was continuing to play the character of John Drake.

Author Dave Rogers claims that Markstein had wanted the character to be a continuation of Drake, but doing so would have meant paying royalties to Ralph Smart, the creator of Danger Man. The second licensed novel based on The Prisoner, published in 1969, refers to Number Six as "Drake" from its first sentence: "Drake woke." The issue has been extensively debated by fans and television critics.

McGoohan had originally wanted to produce only seven episodes of The Prisoner, but Grade argued that more shows were necessary in order for him to sell the series to CBS. The exact number that was agreed to and how the series was to end are disputed by different sources.

In an August 1967 article, Dorothy Manners reported that CBS had asked McGoohan to produce 36 segments, but he would agree to produce only 17. According to a 1977 interview, Lew Grade requested 26 episodes, but McGoohan thought this would spread the show too thin, managing to come up with only 17. According to The Prisoner: The Official Companion to the Classic TV Series, the series was originally supposed to run longer, but was cancelled, forcing McGoohan to write the final episode in only a few days.

The Prisoner had its British premiere on 29 September 1967 on ATV Midlands, and the last episode first aired on 1 February 1968 on Scottish Television. The world broadcast premiere was on the CTV Television Network in Canada on 5 September 1967.

=== Filming ===
Filming began with the shooting of the series' opening sequence in London on 28 August 1966, with location work beginning on 5 September 1966, primarily in Portmeirion, North Wales. This location partially inspired the show. At the request of Portmeirion's architect Clough Williams-Ellis, the main location for the series was not disclosed until the opening credits of the final episode, where it was described as "The Hotel Portmeirion, Penrhyndeudraeth, North Wales". Many local residents were recruited as extras. The Village setting was further augmented by the use of the backlot facilities at MGM-British Studios in Borehamwood.

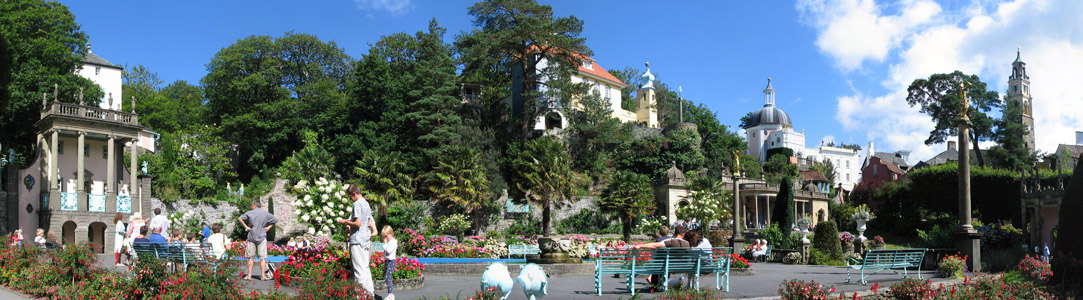
A panoramic view of the central piazza, Portmeirion village, 2007

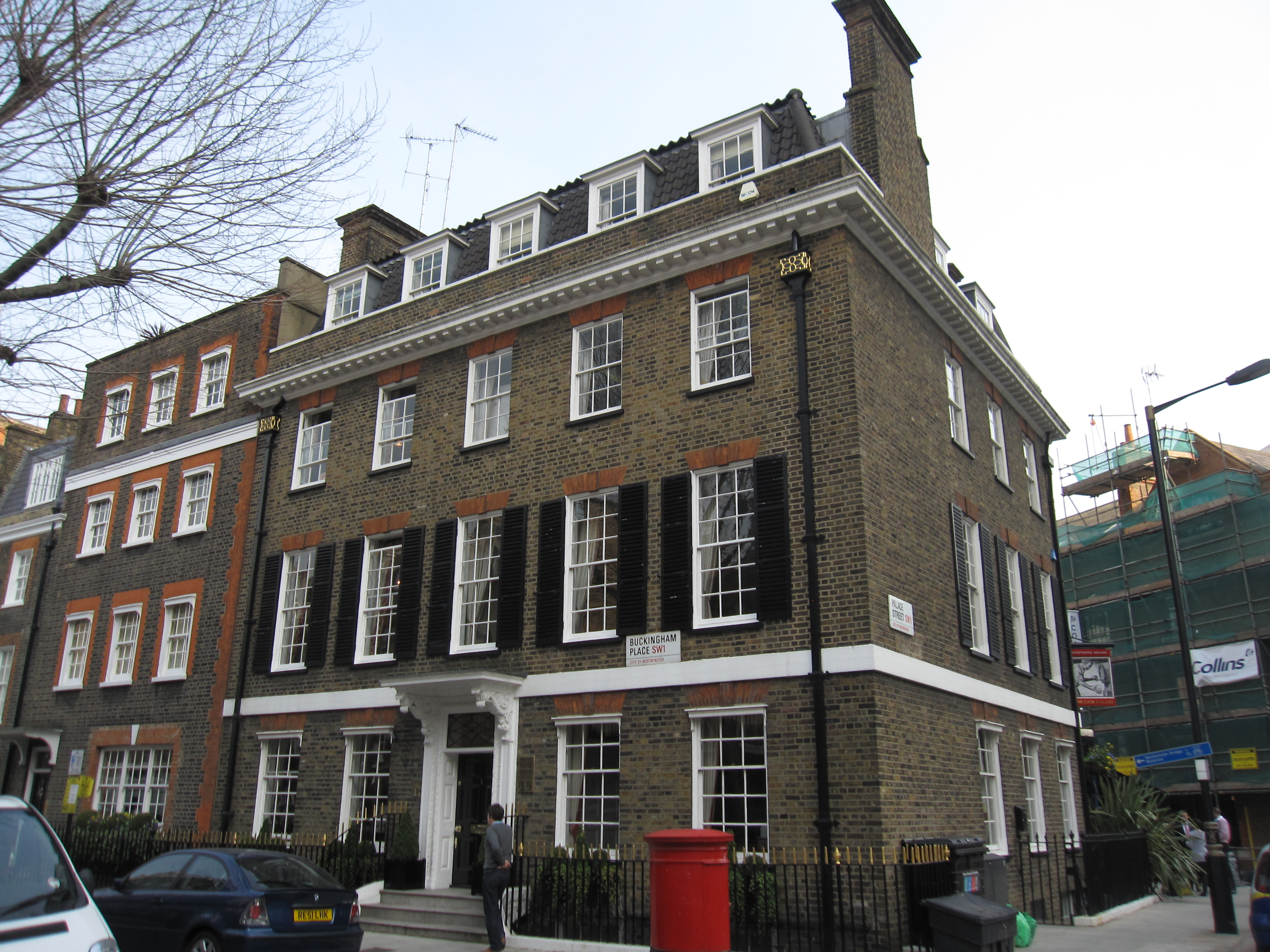
The building at 1 Buckingham Place, used for Number Six's home (2011)

Additionally, filming of a key sequence of the opening credits—and of exterior location filming for three episodes—took place at 1 Buckingham Place in Westminster, which at the time was a private residence, presented as Number Six's home. The building is now a highlight of Prisoner location tours, and currently houses the headquarters of the Royal Warrant Holders Association.

The episodes "Many Happy Returns", "The Girl Who Was Death" (the cricket match for which was filmed at four locations, with the main sequences filmed at Eltisley in Cambridgeshire) and "Fall Out" also made use of extensive location shooting in London and other locations.

At the time, most British television was broadcast in black and white, but the show was filmed in colour to reach the American audience.

=== Crew ===
- George Markstein – Script editor
- Don Chaffey – Director
- David Tomblin – Director
- Peter Graham Scott – Director
- Brendan J. Stafford – Cinematographer
- Bernard Williams – Production manager
- Eric Mival – Music editor
- Albert Elms – Musical director and composer
- Frank Maher – Fight/stunt coordinator
- Rose Tobias Shaw – Casting director

=== Background of the Village ===
Patrick McGoohan created a detailed guide for the writers of the series, detailing what the series was about, and how the village would work, the practical matters around use of phones and the numbers instead of names.

According to the writer James Follett, a friend and protégé of George Markstein, Markstein had developed a backstory explaining the origin of the Village and its connection to Number Six's resignation.

Markstein's concept was that John Drake (of Danger Man) had once proposed a strategy for dealing with retired secret agents who could still pose a security risk. Years later, Drake discovers that his proposal was put into practice, not as a benign means of retirement, but an interrogation centre and prison camp known as The Village.

Outraged, Drake resigns, knowing he will be taken to The Village, where he planned to learn everything he can about how his idea has been implemented and find a way to destroy it. Due to the range of nationalities and agents present, Drake realises that he can't be sure whose Village he is in—his own, or one belonging to the other side.

Markstein later commented:

The prisoner was going to leave the Village and he was going to have adventures in many parts of the world, but ultimately he would always be a prisoner. By that I don't mean he would always go back to the Village. He would always be a prisoner of his circumstances, his situation, his secret, his background ... and 'they' would always be there to ensure that his captivity continues.

== Reception ==
The finale of The Prisoner left numerous open-ended questions, generating controversy and letters of outrage. Following the final episode, McGoohan "claimed he had to go into hiding for a while".

== Home media ==
=== Video tapes ===
Numerous editions of The Prisoner were released in the UK by companies such as Carlton, the copyright holder of the TV series. The first VHS and Betamax releases were through Precision Video in 1982 from 16mm original prints. They released four tapes, each with two episodes edited together: "The Arrival"/"The Schizoid Man", "Many Happy Returns"/"A. B. and C.", "Checkmate"/"Free For All", and "The General"/"The Chimes of Big Ben", thus omitting the final storyline. In 1986, Channel 5 Video (a now-defunct home video brand owned by Universal Pictures) released a series of all 17 episodes on VHS and LaserDisc. In 1993 PolyGram Video released the entire series plus a special feature called The Best of The Prisoner on five VHS cassette tapes.

In North America, MPI Home Video released a total of 20 VHS videotapes in 1984, encompassing the entire series: one tape for each of the 17 episodes plus three more containing "The Alternate Version of 'The Chimes of Big Ben'", a documentary, and a "best of" retrospective. MPI also released editions of nine LaserDiscs in 1988 and 1998, the last disc of which comprised the final Episode 17, "Fall Out", plus "The Prisoner Video Companion" on side two.

=== DVD ===
In 2000, the first DVD release in the UK was issued by Carlton International Entertainment, with A&E Home Video releasing the same DVDs in North America/Region 1 (in four-episode sets as well as a comprehensive 10-disc "mega-box" edition). A&E subsequently reissued the mega-box in a 40th anniversary edition in 2007. The A&E issue included an alternative version of "The Chimes of Big Ben" and the MPI-produced documentary (but not the redundant "best of" retrospective) among its limited special features. In Australia, Umbrella Entertainment released a DVD set in 2003. In 2005 DeAgostini in the UK released all 17 episodes in a fortnightly partwork series.

The Prisoner: 40th Anniversary Special Edition DVD box-set released in 2007 featured standard-definition versions from high-definition masters created by Network. It also included a production guide to the series by Andrew Pixley.

=== Blu-ray ===
The Prisoner: The Complete Series was released on Blu-ray Disc in the United Kingdom in September 2009, following in North America in October 2009. The episodes were restored by the company Network Distributing to create new high-definition masters. The box-set features all 17 remastered episodes plus extensive special features, including the feature-length documentary Don't Knock Yourself Out, a restored original edit of "Arrival" and extensive archive photos and production stills.

The Prisoner: 50th Anniversary Set was released in the United Kingdom in July 2019. It featured a six-disc Blu-ray collection with none of the extra material found on the DVD box-set released for the 40th anniversary included. The first half of Andrew Pixley's production book was now illustrated and presented in hardback, and text commentaries for every episode detailing the production story of the series were included for the first time. A six-CD set of remastered music was also included. Some additional extras were included, such as an interview with McGoohan's daughter, Catherine. Missing from the set was the Don't Knock Yourself Out documentary, the script PDFs and some episode commentaries.

== Spin-offs ==
=== Books ===
In the late 1960s, the TV series quickly spawned three novels tied into the series. In the 1970s and into the 1980s, as the series gained cult status, a large amount of fan-produced material began to appear, with the official appreciation society forming in 1977. In 1988, the first officially sanctioned guide—The Prisoner Companion—was released. It was not well received by fans or Patrick McGoohan. In 1989, Oswald and Carraze released The Prisoner in France with a translated version appearing shortly after.

From the 1990s, numerous other books about the TV series and Patrick McGoohan have been produced. Robert Fairclough's books—including two volumes of original scripts—are considered some of the best researched books available. For the 40th anniversary, Andrew Pixley wrote a well-received and in-depth account of the series' production. There are guides to shooting locations in Portmeirion and also a biography of co-creator George Markstein. Some members of the production crew have released books about their time working on the series including Eric Mival and Ian Rakoff.

=== Games ===
In the early 1980s, Edu-Ware produced two computer games based upon the series for the Apple II computer. The first, titled simply The Prisoner, was released in 1980, followed by Prisoner 2 in 1982.

Steve Jackson Games' popular role-playing game system GURPS released a (now out of print) world book for The Prisoner. It included maps, episode synopses and details of the Village and its inhabitants.

=== Comics ===
In 1988, DC Comics released Shattered Visage, the first part of a four-issue comic-book miniseries based on the characters in the TV series. In 2018, Titan Comics re-issued Shattered Visage as well as releasing The Prisoner: The Uncertainty Machine, another four-part series of comics about another spy returning to the Village. Although Patrick McGoohan's Number Six is depicted on covers of the 2018 series, the character plays no direct role in the story.

=== Remakes ===
In 2009, the show was remade as a miniseries, also titled The Prisoner, which aired in the U.S. on AMC. The miniseries stars Jim Caviezel as Number 6, and Ian McKellen as Number 2, and was shot on location in Namibia and South Africa. The new series received mainly unfavourable reviews, with a 45/100 rating by 21 critics and 3.6/10 by 82 users as of July 2018.

A second television adaptation was reported to be in development for Amazon MGM Studios in November 2026, executive produced by Susan Montford and Don Murphy of Angry Films, along with ITV Studios' Philippe Maigret and Lucienne Papon. The remake will be set in more modern times from the original series.

=== Proposed film adaptations ===
Simon West was attached to a film adaptation of the series in 2001, which failed to materialise. Christopher Nolan was reported to be considering a film version in 2009 but later dropped out of the project. The producer Barry Mendel said a decision to continue with the project depended on the success of the television miniseries.

In 2016, Ridley Scott was in talks to direct a film adaptation. Nolan was once again tied to a potential film in 2024.

=== Audio dramas ===
In January 2015, Big Finish Productions, best known for its long-running series of BBC-licensed audio dramas based upon Doctor Who, announced that it would be producing licensed audio dramas based on The Prisoner, with the first scheduled for release in 2016, and that Mark Elstob would play Number Six. The first series, containing new reimaginings of three original series scripts, "Arrival", "The Schizoid Man" and "The Chimes of Big Ben", and one new story, "Your Beautiful Village", written and directed by Nicholas Briggs, was released in January 2016 and was well received. The first series also featured John Standing, Celia Imrie, Ramon Tikaram and Michael Cochrane as Number Two and Helen Goldwyn as The Village Voice/Operations Controller.

A second series was released in August 2017, comprising four stories: "I Met a Man Today" (adapted from "Many Happy Returns"), "Project Six" (adapted from "A, B and C"), an adaptation of "Hammer into Anvil", and new story "Living in Harmony" (not adapted from the TV episode of the same title).

A third series was released in November 2019, comprising four stories: An adaptation of "Free For All", and new stories "The Girl Who Was Death" (using story elements, but not directly adapted, from the TV episode of the same title), "The Seltzman Connection", and "No One Will Know" (the last two using story elements from "Do Not Forsake Me, O My Darling").

These audio dramas have been broadcast by BBC Radio 4 Extra as part of its The 7th Dimension programming.

== Cultural impact ==
Although the show was sold as a thriller in the mould of Danger Man, McGoohan's previous series, its surreal and Kafkaesque setting and reflection of concerns of the 1960s counterculture have had a far-reaching influence on popular culture and the series ultimately developed a cult following.

Since its debut, the series' enduring popularity has led to its influencing and being referenced in a range of other media, such as the film The Truman Show, and the television shows Lost and The X-Files. The producer of The X-Files called The Prisoner "the Gone with the Wind of its genre."

Mark Frost, co-creator of Twin Peaks, has stated that The Prisoner was a large influence on him and the show. The Guardian wrote that "Without The Prisoner, we'd never have had cryptic, mindbending TV series like Twin Peaks or Lost. It's the Citizen Kane of British TV – a programme that changed the landscape."

The show also has several technology-focused science fiction themes throughout. The use of super-computers is explored in the technological and philosophical context, with Episode 6 "The General", which enabled instant learning and predictive capabilities. Similarly, mind control technology is used, with a computer uploading scenarios, in combination with psychotropic drugs, to the brain of Number Six in Episode 3 "A B C". Throughout the show, a device called Rover is used as an autonomous security system, deployed whenever residents attempt to escape the village.

== Awards and honours ==
- The final episode, "Fall Out", received a Hugo Award nomination for Best Dramatic Presentation in 1969.
- In 2002, the series won the Prometheus Hall of Fame Award.
- In 2004 and 2007, it was ranked No. 7 on TV Guide's Top Cult Shows Ever.
- In 1997 and 2001, TV Guide listed "Fall Out" as the 55th Greatest TV Episode of All Time.
- In 2005, readers of SFX magazine awarded the series fifth place in a poll of British fantasy and science fiction television programmes.
- A 2005 survey of leading rock and film stars by Uncut magazine ranking films, books, music or TV shows that changed the world, placed The Prisoner at No. 10, the highest for a TV show.
- In 2013, TV Guide ranked it as the #9 sci-fi show.

== See also ==
- In My Mind, documentary about Patrick McGoohan and the making of The Prisoner TV series
