= Seed of Destruction (Space: 1999) =

- Space: 1999 episode
- Episode no.: Series 2 Episode 11
- Directed by: Kevin Connor
- Written by: John Goldsmith
- Editing by: Mike Campbell
- Production code: SPII 13
- Original air date: 11 November 1976

Guest appearances
- Martha Nairn as Joanna Cranston; Jack Klaff as Launch Pad Guard; James Leith as Observatory Guard; Albin Pahernik as Maya/Space Animal; Robert Reeves as Peter; Pam Rose as Alphan Operative

Episode chronology
← Previous "New Adam New Eve"	Next → "The AB Chrysalis"

"Seed of Destruction" is the 11th episode of the second series of Space: 1999 (and the 35th episode overall of the programme). The screenplay was written by John Goldsmith; the director was Kevin Connor. The final shooting script is dated 25 May 1976. Live action filming took place from Wednesday 7 to Friday 23 July 1976.

== Plot ==
The Moon is passing a jewel-like asteroid which is emitting an energy field. Commander Koenig and Captain Carter take an Eagle to survey it. They detect an area with breathable atmosphere and land on a sandy plain surrounded by crystal structures.

While Carter investigates a malfunction on the Eagle, Koenig explores the terrain. He takes a crystal sample and enters a cave with reflective walls. One of the walls retains his reflection and produces a three-dimensional mirror image of him, which shocks him unconscious with an energy blast. On the Eagle, the malfunction has corrected itself. Carter is joined by Koenig's impostor and they depart.

On Alpha, the facsimile announces that the Moon is enveloped in an energy screen which is draining the base's power. To break free, they must fire an energy beam at the asteroid, which will reflect it back and shatter the screen. Alpha's technicians set to work building an energy projector.

When Maya questions the impostor's analysis, it angrily confines her to quarters. Worried by Koenig's recent behaviour, as well the strain that firing the beam will put on the life support systems, Dr Russell and Controller Verdeschi fear that the commander has been affected by an alien force.

In the cave, the real Koenig regains consciousness. A disembodied voice tells him that he is a prisoner of the planet Kalthon. Home to an advanced civilisation, Kalthon was destroyed when a black sun absorbed its energy. The asteroid is an artificial structure designed to be the "seed" of Kalthon's rebirth. It contains the remnants of the civilisation suspended in microcosm, waiting to be regenerated using the energy supplied by Alpha.

When the impostor refuses to undergo a medical exam, Russell is shocked by the iciness of its skin and realises that this is not the Koenig she knows. Searching for answers, Maya shapeshifts into a technician to steal a portion of the crystal sample, then runs an analysis. The crystal is living matter, hyper-dense but able to be shattered at the right audio frequency.

Preparations are complete and the energy beam is initiated. As life support begins to fail, Verdeschi and Maya hijack an Eagle and set off for the asteroid. Furious, the impostor orders Carter to shoot them down, but Carter refuses to comply and the impostor backs off when Russell points out that firing the laser batteries would divert power from the beam.

Verdeschi and Maya land on the asteroid, which is already changing composition. Entering the cave, they find a mirror showing a sourceless reflection of Koenig, which they surmise is the real commander. They release him by breaking the mirror with a laser. Koenig returns to Alpha to confront the impostor while Verdeschi and Maya attack the Kalthon intelligence. They use their radios to emit a crystal-shattering frequency but the intelligence freezes them in crystal before they can do much damage.

The impostor orders more power as vital systems fail one by one. The real Koenig arrives and reveals the impostor's true motives. As Carter shoots it to no effect, the impostor declares that Kalthon will live. Koenig emits the frequency and the impostor screams as it shatters into dust. The beam is shut off. Its power exhausted, the Heart of Kalthon releases Verdeschi and Maya, then dies.

== Regular cast ==
- Martin Landau as Commander John Koenig
- Barbara Bain as Dr Helena Russell
- Catherine Schell as Maya
- Tony Anholt as Tony Verdeschi
- Nick Tate as Captain Alan Carter
- Zienia Merton as Sandra Benes
- Jeffery Kissoon as Dr Ben Vincent

== Production ==
This episode would see the final revamping of the cavern set-pieces initially built for the season-opener, "The Metamorph". Painted turquoise and covered with glitter for this outing, the money-saving caves had appeared in nine previous episodes ("The Metamorph", "The Exiles", "One Moment of Humanity", "All That Glisters", "Journey to Where", "The Mark of Archanon", "New Adam, New Eve", "Catacombs of the Moon" and "The AB Chrysalis"). The angled windows of the observatory had been used during the first series on the balcony of the Main Mission set.

Writer John Goldsmith had conceived of the Koenig-replica being much more alien in nature, its eyes flaring with white light and able to paralyse and control humans with a touch. The idea of its appearance being a literal reflection and this fact becoming an integral part of the plot was added by producer Fred Freiberger. The transformation of the crystal was initially more visually dramatic: a green, pulsing glow with 'crimson veins' and perceived 'amoebal shapes wriggling and twisting'.

Deviations from the final shooting script included: (1) The status-report date was originally cited as 508 days; this was adjusted in post production; (2) Yasko was to have appeared in the episode instead of Sahn; (3) During the energy transfer, the crystal sample in Maya's quarters was to be seen regenerating in harmony with the asteroid in a scene cut for time; (4) The original epilogue was also cut, which saw the Alphans launch the remaining crystal sample into space, giving the Kalthon race another chance at life—now that the amoral intelligence was destroyed.

Martin Landau emphatically believed his left profile was superior to his right and was notorious for insisting any scene he appeared in be set up to capture him only from this side. Director Kevin Connor recalls, in this episode, Landau allowed himself to be filmed in right profile—provided he was playing his evil replica at the time.

=== Music ===
The score was re-edited from previous Space: 1999 incidental music tracks composed for the second series by Derek Wadsworth and draws primarily from the scores of "The Exiles" and "One Moment of Humanity".

== Reception ==
TV Zone magazine commented negatively on the episode, considering it a "tired" take on the evil double fantasy trope.

Praising the episode, John Kenneth Muir argued that the characterisations made up for the "hackneyed" plot, describing the Alphans as "well drawn [...], each working their own specific agenda. [...] All these conflicts are involving and nicely performed, elevating the episode beyond its clichéd premise."

SFX magazine rated the episode "B-plus", believing it to be redeemed by the design of the asteroid cave as well as the "excellent" performance by Landau.

Giving the episode 4 out of 10, Dreamwatch Bulletin was critical of Landau, writing that instead of using the role of the doppelganger to "highlight different aspects of Koenig's personality", the actor just "shouts at everybody and frowns a lot."

== Novelisation ==
The episode was adapted in the third Year Two Space: 1999 novel The Space-Jackers by Michael Butterworth published in 1977. Butterworth would integrate ideas seen in earlier-draft scripts into this adaptation. Before the energy transfer, Kalthon was passively draining power from Alpha, causing reduced heating and equipment malfunctions. The scene where Maya and company observe her crystal sample transforming was retained, and a new epilogue showing she and Verdeschi being rescued from the disintegrating asteroid was added.

== 2015 re-version ==
In 2015, Network Distributing in the UK created a special re-version of the episode into Season 1 format, which was premiered at the Andercon 2015 convention on 13 June. This one-off experiment had a newly edited Barry Gray score (in place of Derek Wadsworth's music) and season 1 style opening credits complete with a "This Episode" montage of shots. It was later featured on Network's Season 2 blu-ray release with reaction varying from extremely positive, with some reviewers citing an improvement over the original, to underwhelming.
