= New Adam New Eve =

- Space: 1999 episode
- Episode no.: Series 2 Episode 10
- Directed by: Charles Crichton
- Written by: Terence Feely
- Editing by: Mike Campbell
- Production code: SPII 10
- Original air date: 2 October 1976

Guest appearances
- Guy Rolfe as Magus; Bernard Kay as Humanoid Mutant; Albin Pahernik as Maya/Creature; Annie Lambert as Julie Tracy; Barbara Wise as Beautiful Girl; Robert Reeves as Peter Reeves; Terry York as Alien Ape

Episode chronology
← Previous "The Rules of Luton"	Next → "Seed of Destruction"

"New Adam New Eve" is the tenth episode of the second series of Space: 1999 (and the 34th episode overall of the programme). The screenplay was written by Terence Feely; the director was Charles Crichton. The final shooting script is dated 29 April 1976. Live action filming took place Wednesday, 2 June 1976 through Friday 18 June 1976. The episode was first broadcast in the UK on 9 October 1976, having previously aired on KRON-TV, San Francisco on 2 October 1976.

== Plot ==
The Moon is rocked by turbulence. After it subsides, the crew of Moonbase Alpha see a robed figure striding through space towards them. Materialising in Command Center, the humanoid introduces himself as Magus – the one true God. Commander Koenig is sceptical, even after Magus demonstrates his powers by conjuring up a banquet and reducing an empty Eagle to molten metal.

Magus has come to guide the Alphans to a new Garden of Eden where humankind can begin again. He shows them a planet hidden by the turbulence – New Earth – and orders Koenig, Dr Russell, Maya and Controller Verdeschi to come to the surface. They board an Eagle and are instantly transported to a lush, fertile glade.

When Koenig suggests bringing down survey teams, Magus replies that no one can join them. The four Alphans are his Adams and Eves, progenitors of a new and improved humanity. He pair-bonds Koenig with Maya and Russell with Verdeschi. To prevent infidelity, he encases the couples in invisible bubbles; each Alphan can touch only his or her mate. Dissolving the Eagle, he orders them never to leave the glade, then vanishes.

Night falls, and the Alphans hear howls. Straying beyond the glade, they see ape-like creatures attacking a deformed humanoid. Magus' face appears in the sky and drives back the Alphans with lightning bolts. The next morning, Magus returns in the flesh and chastises the Alphans for their disobedience. He creates a force field to keep them inside the glade.

Having covertly scanned Magus with a medical device, Maya reports that his abilities are not supernatural; there is a machine inside his body, and it is probably being overworked. Discovering that the force field ends at the tree-tops, she shapeshifts into an owl and flies off to reconnoitre their surroundings.

On Alpha, Captain Carter attempts to launch another Eagle and fly to New Earth. Magus uses his powers to keep the spacecraft on the ground. After adding booster rockets, Carter tries again and nearly overpowers Magus, who is left briefly exhausted.

Maya sights tracks possibly belonging to the apes. While following the tracks, the group fend off an attack by giant reptiles. They encounter the mutant, who tells them that Magus is the last of a race of cosmic "magicians" determined to discover the secret of creation. The fauna of New Earth are descended from species that he transported for experimental breeding.

Magus reappears and is berated by the Alphans. He says that they will solve the mystery of creation together, threatening to destroy Alpha if denied. He then rushes off before the sun sets. Maya infers that his implant needs light, and to defeat him, they must place him in total darkness.

The Alphans devise a trap using a camouflaged pit. The next day, Magus returns and falls in. As the Alphans cover the hole, Magus demands light – or New Earth is doomed. The Moon's gravity begins to tear the planet apart. The Eagle re-appears and the Alphans hurry aboard. Koenig offers to take the mutant, but it declines, preferring to die. The Alphans lift off as the planet disintegrates. On the way home, they speculate that if even a sliver of light hit Magus during the break-up, he could have survived.

== Regular cast ==
- Martin Landau as Commander John Koenig
- Barbara Bain as Dr Helena Russell
- Catherine Schell as Maya
- Tony Anholt as Tony Verdeschi
- Nick Tate as Captain Alan Carter
- Yasuko Nagazumi as Yasko

== Production ==
The shooting script for "New Adam New Eve" contains several sequences removed from the episode's final cut: (1) The fact that the Moon was 150,000 miles distant from New Earth; (2) A sequence of friendly banter where, after Verdeschi comments on the richness of New Earth's soil, Koenig would declare the planet to be as fertile as California was 150 years before. Verdeschi then compared it to Italy's Calabria of the present. Maya would joke about the bandits of the Calabrian hills, and Koenig would quip that all the Italian bandits went into politics in the 1980s. Verdeschi would then remind them all that Italian politics may not have been perfect, but it was an American who spoiled the United World movement in 1985; (3) When Carter made his first attempt to rescue Koenig in Eagle One, he would be accompanied by another pilot in Eagle Two; (4) The mutant reveals to Koenig that Magus was the last of his kind because his race had challenged a mysterious being more powerful than all of them combined. Magus was off travelling and survived. The real purpose of Magus's quest for a superior race was to do battle with this super-being.

The mutant cave animals were scripted to be an enormous crustacean, a gigantic tarantula and a huge reptile. Visual effects supervisor Brian Johnson and the Bray Studios team hoped to achieve this vision using stop-motion animation, but this would have proved to be too costly and time-consuming. This resulted in a re-write where the creatures all became reptiles and realised with Komodo dragons.

This episode debuted a revised version of Catherine Schell's Psychon make-up. ITC executives felt the brown-pigmented ears read on screen as 'dirty'. With her ears now left natural, the 'sideburn' cheekbone pigment would be made less prominent as well. Hairdresser Jeannette Freeman would experiment with a new hairstyle for Schell, which was seen in this segment and early scenes of "The AB Chrysalis" before returning to her previous style.

This episode also introduced Helena's hi-tech medical scanner—two small Perspex magnifying lenses which retracted into a small casing—with which she could scan or diagnose anything future scripts required (à la Dr. McCoy's whistling medical Feinberger on Star Trek). This would be the last time that the Eagle passenger module set would be seen with its eight-seat configuration.

=== Music ===
The score was re-edited from previous Space: 1999 incidental music tracks composed for the second series by Derek Wadsworth and draws primarily from the scores of "The Metamorph" and "The Taybor". During the 'night of romance' on New Earth, an arrangement of 'How Beautiful Is Night' composed by Robert Farnon in 1947 is used as Magus's mood music.

== Reception ==
SFX magazine rated the episode "B-plus", complimenting the "nice performances" of the lead actors. Dreamwatch Bulletin gave it 6 out of 10. TV Zone magazine commented negatively on the "unremarkable" episode, calling the plot "standard" and Rolfe "woefully" miscast as Magus.

John Kenneth Muir gave the episode a negative review, writing that it employs "every bad sci-fi television cliché imaginable" and feels like a rehash of various Star Trek episodes. He also criticised aspects of the design, calling the alien costumes "laughable at best" and stating that the giant reptiles are clearly realised by "life-size reptiles creeping about on miniature sets".

Examining the influence of Star Trek on Space: 1999, Benedictine University's James F. Iaccino commented that the viewer is "immediately reminded" of the Star Trek episode "Who Mourns for Adonais?", in which the crew of the USS Enterprise are held against their will by a powerful alien entity that human ancestors venerated as the ancient Greek god Apollo. Iaccino called this "perhaps the most glaring example of plot borrowing" from the earlier series. Muir compares Magus to the immortal human Flint in the episode "Requiem for Methuselah".

== Novelisation ==
The episode was adapted in the first Year Two Space: 1999 novel Planets of Peril by Michael Butterworth published in 1977. The only difference from the finished episode was a reference that Maya was new to the position of scientific officer, as it was written to have taken place soon after "The Metamorph".
