= All That Glisters (Space: 1999) =

- Space: 1999 episode
- Episode no.: Series 2 Episode 5
- Directed by: Ray Austin
- Written by: Keith Miles
- Editing by: Alan Killick
- Production code: SPII 4
- Original air date: 28 October 1976

Guest appearances
- Patrick Mower as Dave Reilly; Barbara Kelly as Computer Voice

Episode chronology
← Previous "One Moment of Humanity"	Next → "The Mark of Archanon"

"All That Glisters" is the fifth episode of the second series of Space: 1999 (and the 29th overall episode of the programme). The screenplay was written by Keith Miles; the director was Ray Austin. The final shooting script is dated 9 March 1976. Live-action filming took place Thursday 18 March 1976 through Wednesday 31 March 1976.

== Plot ==
Eagle 4 is en route to a planet to mine for milgonite detected by Moonbase Alpha's long-range sensors. The mineral is vital to the base's life support system. Due to the Moon's velocity, the Eagle crew, led by Commander Koenig, have only three hours to complete the mission.

Despite cloud cover and evidence of past surface water, the planet is a desert. The team land near what instruments read as a large milgonite deposit. Geologist Dave Reilly leads the team to a gully containing a luminescent rock formation, believed to be the milgonite. After Reilly uses his laser-gun to blast off a fragment, both the sample rock and its "parent" ooze fluid from the point where the laser struck. Reilly finds that the rock is not milgonite, but a mineral amalgam. The fluid contains structures similar to blood corpuscles, suggesting that the rock is a living organism: a "petro-form".

Aboard the Eagle, the fragment fires energy beams at Tony Verdeschi, incapacitating and then controlling him. It drives him to proceed to the gully, shoot off another fragment, and take it back to the Eagle, where the two fragments fuse into a larger rock. Koenig orders immediate lift-off for Alpha, but the petro-form, apparently sentient, cannot be removed from the Eagle. Using her shapeshifting ability, Maya tries to open negotiations by transforming into an identical rock, but the petro-form will not communicate. The petro-form locks everyone outside except Verdeschi and Dr Russell, then uses its beams to absorb the Eagle's water supply. Over her commlock, Russell tells the others that the rock is glowing more brightly, indicating that it needs water to survive. The others speculate that long ago, a natural disaster destroyed the planet's rain cycle, and as the petro-forms drained all the water, they began dying out.

The petro-form uses the computer to search for a planet with water. Unable to leave the rest of itself behind, it sends out Verdeschi to gather more fragments. The rest of the group ambush Verdeschi, causing him to be teleported back. Using Verdeschi's lost commlock, Reilly storms the Eagle and frees Russell and Verdeschi, but is captured by the petro-form.

Koenig has his laser-gun modified to quadruple its power. Maya, again a rock, is placed between the Eagle and the gully. The petro-form activates Reilly, who takes the Maya-Rock into the Eagle. Koenig and Alan Carter slip aboard but are immobilised by the petro-form, which starts to assimilate the Maya-Rock. This causes it to loosen its grip on Koenig and Carter, who break free. Koenig shoots the petro-form and the rock stops glowing, killed by the laser's dehydrating effect.

With the Moon nearly out of range, the team depart. They see now that the petro-form was acting out of desperation. Knowing that the parent rock will die without water, Maya and Reilly theorise that seeding the clouds with nucleoid-active crystals could restore the rain cycle. The team release the crystals, generating storm clouds and rain.

== Regular cast ==
- Martin Landau as Commander John Koenig
- Barbara Bain as Dr Helena Russell
- Catherine Schell as Maya
- Tony Anholt as Tony Verdeschi
- Nick Tate as Captain Alan Carter

== Production ==
"All That Glisters" was greatly disliked by director Ray Austin and the cast. Martin Landau was known for doodling and writing frank comments on his copy of each episode's script; the notes for this episode were especially contentious: 'All the credibility we are building up is totally forsaken...story is told poorly! Characters go out the window...the character of Koenig takes a terrible beating in this script—we are all shmucks!' Exasperated with shooting a leading character that was a lump of papier-mâché, Austin purportedly delivered a large rock the size of a cannonball to producer Fred Freiberger's office one morning with the attached note: 'I name this rock Freiberger'. On completing this episode, Austin ended his association with the programme; after directing one episode of The New Avengers, he relocated to America.

Landau had enjoyed considerable creative input throughout the first series; that ended when Freiberger became show runner. Years later, Tony Anholt commented: 'Martin was desperately unhappy about the whole script; he thought it was absolute rubbish. We all did. Freddie, once he saw the opposition, just became utterly entrenched and would give nothing at all—that was "the greatest episode of the series, it was the most sci-fi type of story." It was going to stay, and he was going to prove his point.' Though tempted to walk off the set, Landau and his fellow cast members ultimately refused to sabotage the production and played the episode as written.

This episode featured the smallest cast in the programme's history: five regulars and one guest artist (not including the uncredited dialogue of the Eagle computer). No scenes took place on Moonbase Alpha; the only standing sets used were the Eagle command module and an expanded passenger module-cum-laboratory. Material trimmed from the final cut includes a sequence where Reilly speculated that the rock was the fall-out of a cosmic storm and had been on the planet for fifty thousand years. This would have appeared during his second examination of the rock with Maya.

=== Music ===
The score was re-edited from previous Space: 1999 incidental music tracks composed for the second series by Derek Wadsworth, primarily the scores of "The Metamorph" and "The Exiles".

== Reception ==
TV Zone gave "All That Glisters" a negative review, finding the story and production design to be weak and criticising the "irritating, stereotyped" character Reilly (who is portrayed as an Irish-born Texan cowboy and womaniser). The magazine summed up the episode as a "dreadful load of hokum" and "an hour wasted". Dreamwatch Bulletin rated the episode 6 out of 10, describing it as "above par" albeit "no classic". Reviewer Anthony McKay commented that while Mower "shines" in his guest role, the story "relies on style and characterisation rather than a good, taut plot told well." SFX gave it a "D-minus", calling the result "dreadful" and Mower's character "just embarrassing". DVD Review described the episode as "cringe-inducing nonsense". Commentator James O'Neill gave it zero stars out of four.

In a positive review, John Kenneth Muir described the premise of a living rock taking over humans as "very clearly a technological space-age update of the traditional zombie story". Likening the Eagle laboratory to a "haunted house setting", Muir called the episode "stylish and smart in visual approach", praising its use of close-ups and reduced lighting to create a "claustrophobic feel". He also applauded the happy ending, noting the Alphans' compassion towards the rock's plight. However, he criticised some of the characterisation, describing Reilly as an "obnoxious" guest character, unfavourably comparing Dr Russell to Star Trek's Dr McCoy, and believing Koenig to be unusually short-tempered and ineffective: "Perhaps because of Landau's displeasure with the story, Koenig is constantly on the verge of catastrophic rage, shouting and yelling at his subordinates like a maniac."

Examining Star Trek's influence on Space: 1999's second series, James F. Iaccino of Benedictine University compared the premise of "All That Glisters" to that of Star Trek episode "The Devil in the Dark", likening the petro-forms to the lethal but intelligent rock-like Horta and Maya's role to that of Spock, whose scientific approach brings about peace and understanding between the Horta and the workforce of a human mining colony. Iaccino also argued that the script clearly evokes one of Dr McCoy's catchphrases when Russell, in a tense moment, says: "I'm a doctor, not a miracle worker".

== Novelisation ==
The episode was adapted in the sixth Year Two Space: 1999 novel The Edge of the Infinite by Michael Butterworth, published in 1977. This novel was not released in the United Kingdom and only as a limited edition in the United States and Germany. In this adaptation, taking place after 25 December 2005, the Moon is on the brink of leaving the galaxy and the panicked Alphans are taking every opportunity to stockpile raw materials to survive as long as possible in the intergalactic void. The search for milgonite on this planet was part of this hoarding exercise.

In the 2003 novel The Forsaken by John Kenneth Muir, it is stated the events of this episode were one of the consequences of the death of the eponymous intelligence depicted in "Space Brain". The Brain controlled the planet's climate to provide an endless supply of water for the silicon-based life forms; after its death, the drought began and the beings would become desperate in their search for the life-giving fluid.
