= The Rules of Luton =

- Space: 1999 episode
- Episode no.: Series 2 Episode 9
- Directed by: Val Guest
- Written by: "Charles Woodgrove"; (Fred Freiberger)
- Cinematography by: Frank Watts
- Editing by: Mike Campbell
- Production code: SPII 7
- Original air date: 16 October 1976

Cast
- Martin Landau as Commander John Koenig; Barbara Bain as Dr Helena Russell; Catherine Schell as Maya; Tony Anholt as Controller Tony Verdeschi; David Jackson as the strongman alien and the voice of the Judges of Luton; Godfrey James as the teleporting alien; Roy Marsden as the invisible alien; Yasuko Nagazumi as Yasko; Annie Lambert as Julie; Jenny Cresswell as an Alphan operative

Episode chronology
← Previous "Brian the Brain"	Next → "New Adam New Eve"

"The Rules of Luton" is an episode of the second series of Space: 1999, a 1970s British science fiction television series produced by Gerry Anderson Productions for ITC Entertainment. Written by producer Fred Freiberger (using the pseudonym "Charles Woodgrove") and directed by Val Guest, it was filmed at Pinewood Studios and on location in May and June 1976.

Opening in 1999, the series follows the crew of lunar colony Moonbase Alpha after a nuclear explosion pushes the Moon out of Earth orbit and into interstellar space. Unable to control the rogue planet's trajectory, the Alphans encounter various astronomical phenomena and alien civilisations as they search for a way back to Earth or a new world to settle on. In "The Rules of Luton", Commander Koenig and Maya are exploring a fertile planet when they inadvertently kill members of its population of sentient plants. Condemning them for murder, the planet's rulers force them into a trial by combat with a trio of humanoid aliens.

The episode was first broadcast in the UK by Associated Television on 21 October 1976, having previously aired on KRON-TV, San Francisco on 16 October 1976. It received a mostly negative response from commentators.

== Plot ==
Koenig, Maya, and Verdeschi are in an Eagle surveying a lush, potentially habitable planet. On landing, the Eagle develops a fault. Verdeschi leaves the others to explore while he flies back to Moonbase Alpha, intending to return in a standby Eagle to pick them up.

Determining that the flora is non-toxic, Maya picks a flower, while Koenig picks and eats a berry. Suddenly the air is filled with disembodied screams and a voice accuses the Alphans of murder. Unknown to them, this planet – Luton – is inhabited by sentient plants. Their accusers, a trio of trees called the Judges of Luton, sentence them to trial by combat with three other alien "criminals": a strongman, a creature who can turn invisible, and another who can teleport. Whichever side kills the other will go free. To stop Koenig and Maya calling Alpha, the Judges jam all radio communications. The aliens are invulnerable to laser sidearms and unwilling to form an alliance with Koenig and Maya, forcing the Alphans to flee.

On Alpha, Verdeschi is launching the standby Eagle when Luton vanishes – concealed by the Judges. Knowing the planet's rough position, Verdeschi disobeys orders to abort and proceeds with the launch.

On Luton, the aliens make clubs out of stone and dead wood and pursue Koenig and Maya to the bank of a river. The Alphans swim across while the aliens, fearing water, consider their next move. Koenig and Maya find skeletons of large animals crushed by vines. They theorise that Luton's flora evolved to dominate its fauna. The teleporter transports himself over the river and clubs Koenig, wounding him. Shapeshifting into a bird and a lion, Maya helps fight off the alien, who topples into the river and drowns. The other aliens cross the river, using a tree log for buoyancy. Koenig and Maya move inland.

Koenig uses his belt and some stones to make a bolas. The conversation shifts to the topic of family. Maya remembers her father's efforts to save Psychon and that her brother fled the planet before it was destroyed, never to be heard from again. Koenig reveals that his wife was a casualty of Earth's third world war and was much like Dr Russell. Locating the Alphans, the invisible alien seizes a boulder and prepares to strike. Noticing his discarded club, Maya shapeshifts into a dog to frighten him away, and he falls off a cliff to his death.

Needing to clean Koenig's wound, Maya re-assumes bird form to look for water. She is captured by the strongman and imprisoned in a cage he has made from his armour. Knowing Maya will be crushed when she can no longer hold her form, Koenig begs the Judges to free her. They decline to intervene, even in exchange for Koenig's life. Forced to fight the strongman, Koenig swings the bolas and immobilises him, then releases Maya. The Judges order Koenig to kill the strongman, but he refuses. As the Judges become exasperated, the plants of Luton turn against them. Facing an uprising, the Judges have no choice but to let all three survivors go.

In space, Verdeschi has reached Luton when the planet suddenly reappears. He avoids crashing into it and retrieves Koenig and Maya.

== Production ==
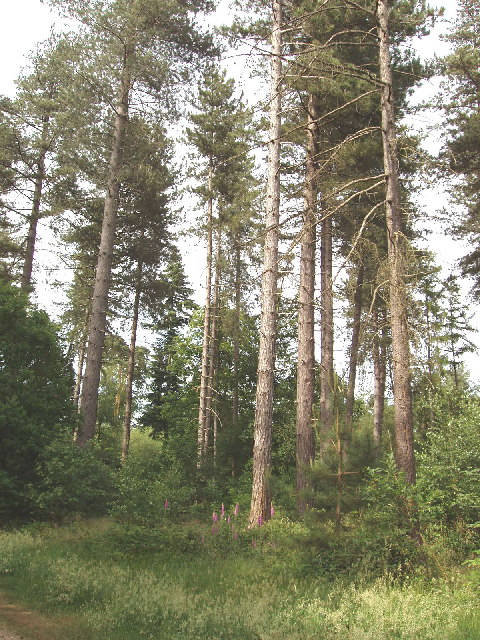
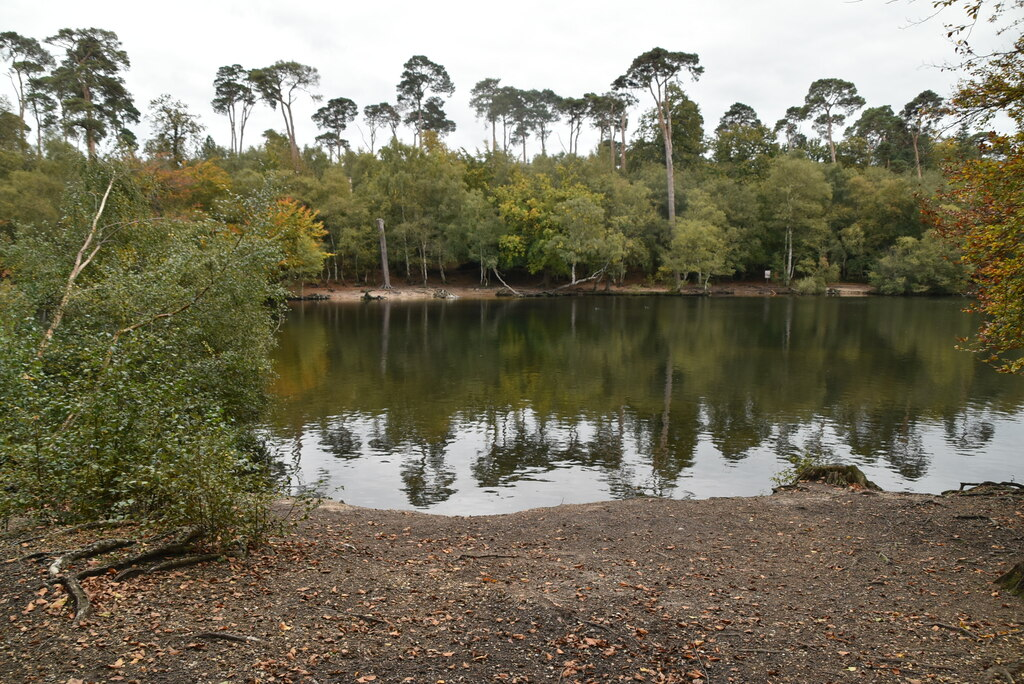
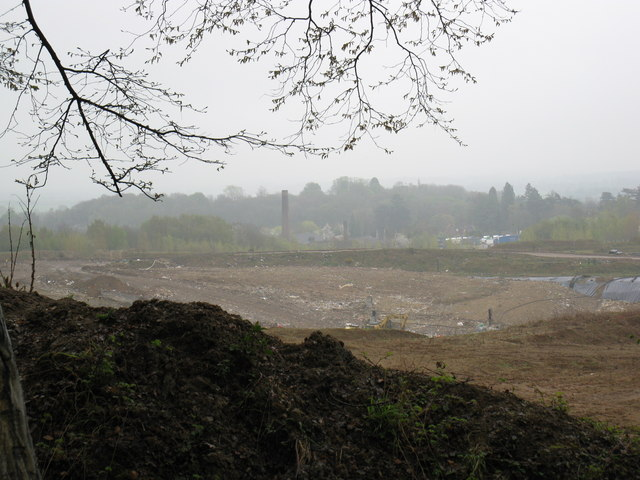
Shooting locations: Black Park, including its lake, in Buckinghamshire (left and centre); and Knowl Hill Quarry in Knowl Hill, Berkshire (right).

Writer-producer Fred Freiberger named the episode "The Rules of Luton" after he remembered seeing a signpost for the town of Luton while travelling along the M1 motorway. In the episode, the name of the planet is pronounced "looh-tarn".

"The Rules of Luton" was filmed over 13 days in May and June 1976. It was one of several episodes to be filmed simultaneously with another episode, to optimise the use of cast and resources and speed up production of Series 2. The episode was shot mostly on location, with only a few regular cast members, so it could be filmed alongside the studio-bound "The Mark of Archanon". Location shooting took place at Knowl Hill Quarry in Knowl Hill, where the production spent six days, and Black Park, including Black Park Lake. According to Landau, who characterised the story as "virtually a chase picture", a total of nine days were spent on location. The skeleton props first appeared as dinosaur fossils in the film One of Our Dinosaurs Is Missing (1975).

According to David Jackson, who played the strongman and voiced the Judges, his costume originally resembled a "teddy bear". This was embellished with a lizard "half-mask" and faux scales to make him look reptilian. Noting that the Judges give the strongman the ability to speak English in the closing scenes, Jackson remembered thinking his utterances should sound "strangled", as the character "would still have vocal cords that were tuned to whatever a crocodile-like beast's might be tuned to [...] And I played it like that." The production was pleased with his performance and invited him back to voice the alien villains of "The Bringers of Wonder".

== Reception ==
— "It's called 'The Rules of Luton'," [Freiberger] declared enthusiastically.

— "The rules of... Luton?"

— "Yes, I saw it on a signpost on the way here!"

— Executive producer Gerry Anderson recalling his
conversation with Freiberger about the title

"The Rules of Luton" had a largely negative response from critics, some of whom ranked it among Space: 1999's worst episodes. TV Zone magazine noted its "B-movie plot" and commented that it represents the series "at its lowest ebb". Publications including Computer Weekly and SFX criticised the choice of title.

In an unfavourable review, John Kenneth Muir criticised the premise, finding the idea of alien plants speaking English and running a judiciary to be absurd. He viewed the Judges' power to cloak Luton as a "nonsensical" plot device, and thought the episode badly "dated" by the alien trio's make-up and "unintentionally hilarious" costumes; he likened the teleporter to the Cowardly Lion and the strongman to an "ageing rock-'n'-roller with acne". Muir also pointed out continuity errors in the aliens' costumes and abilities, and criticised the stock footage used to show Maya shapeshifting into a lion. Although he considered Koenig and Maya's conversation about family to be "extraordinarily well written", he negatively noted that it contains some "very Star Trek-kian" philosophising about how it took a final world war to put an end to racial and religious strife on Earth. He found this incongruous, pointing out that Space: 1999's first episode establishes that future Earth is still imperfect. He argued that Freiberger's inclusion of the scene showed his "ignorance" of the series' continuity.

DreamWatch Bulletin was more positive, rating the episode 7 out of 10. Characterising it as a cross between Star Trek and Gardeners' Question Time, reviewer Anthony McKay wrote that it suffers from having a limited cast of two regulars, "three men in cheap alien costumes, and a trio of talking trees". However, he added that "contrary to popular myth, this story is not that bad [... rattling] along at a decent pace with the requisite number of excitement stops along the way".

Several reviewers found the episode derivative of the Star Trek: The Original Series episode "Arena" (1967), itself based on a short story of the same name by Fredric Brown. DreamWatch Bulletin called it a "rip-off" of the Star Trek episode. Muir believed it to be an "incredibly thin re-telling", noting that Star Trek's "Arena" was also influenced by The Outer Limits' episode "Fun and Games". Although it gave the episode a low grade of "D-plus", SFX found the result "not quite as awful as it sounds" thanks to Brown's source material.

Comparing "The Rules of Luton" and Star Trek's "Arena", James F. Iaccino of Benedictine University argued that the plots of the two episodes are essentially the same, including the protagonist's victory and release from combat. He added: "The only variation in the storylines is how the otherworldly judges react to the merciful behaviour of the humans. In the Star Trek universe, the Federation is regarded as a possible equal in the not-too-distant future, while in the Space: 1999 timeline, the Alphan community is viewed as a contaminating influence that has introduced feelings of injustice and rebellion into the sentient vegetation on the planet".
