= Catacombs of the Moon =

- Space: 1999 episode
- Episode no.: Series 2 Episode 13
- Directed by: Robert Lynn
- Written by: Anthony Terpiloff
- Editing by: Bill Blunden
- Production code: SPII 11
- Original air date: 13 November 1976

Guest appearances
- James Laurenson as Patrick Osgood; Pamela Stephenson as Michelle Osgood; Lloyd McGuire as 1st Mining Engineer; Brendan Price as 1st Guard (Morgan); Alan Hunter as Eagle Co-Pilot (Bill); Karen Ford as Nurse

Episode chronology
← Previous "The AB Chrysalis"	Next → "Space Warp"

"Catacombs of the Moon" is the 13th episode of the second series of Space: 1999 (and the 37th overall episode of the programme). The screenplay was written by Anthony Terpiloff; the director was Robert Lynn. The original title was "The Catacombs of the Moon".

The final shooting script is dated 18 May 1976, with amendments dated 26 May, 9 June, and 14 and 17 June 1976. Live-action filming took place Monday 21 June 1976 until Tuesday 6 July 1976. Production was halted for two days (starting 2 July) when the fire effects used in the Osgood vision sequences got out of hand and the fire brigade had to be called in.

The episode was first broadcast on 13 November 1976 on KRON-TV, San Francisco, and on 25 November 1976 on Associated Television in the UK.

== Plot ==
Geologist Patrick Osgood keeps having visions of Moonbase Alpha being destroyed in an inferno. They all begin with the same image: his wife Michelle lying in a bed on the lunar surface while blazing energy rains down. The bed is encircled by fire, and Michelle, too weak to save herself, is consumed by the flames.

In the real world, Osgood leads mining teams through the caves beneath Alpha in search of tiranium, a rare metal which is an essential component of the base's life support system. It is also needed to perfect an artificial heart for Michelle, who is dying of heart disease. After a fruitless expedition, Osgood visits Michelle in Medical. Always a religious man, he has become a fanatic since his wife's diagnosis, believing himself to be a prophet and viewing Dr Russell's treatments as blasphemy. He assures Michelle that he will be the saviour of them both.

The Moon enters an area of intense heat, putting pressure on life support and Alpha's dwindling tiranium supply. Sensors are unable to identify a cause, so Commander Koenig leads an Eagle crew into space on a reconnaissance mission. In Medical, Dr Russell tests yet another artificial heart for Michelle. In the current circumstances no tiranium can be spared, and without tiranium-coated valves, the heart fails.

Increasingly agitated, Osgood gets into a fight with Controller Verdeschi's security team. Driven away by Maya, who has shapeshifted into a German Shepherd, he flees to an explosives storeroom. He is later found bloodied and semi-conscious and is taken to Medical. As Russell treats him, he threatens her with a suicide belt he made. He plans to take Michelle down to the caves before Alpha is destroyed in the coming holocaust. Knowing that Michelle cannot survive that level of exertion, Russell begs Osgood not to take her, but her appeals are useless and the couple leave together.

In space, the Eagle encounters the heat source – a disc of flaming hydrogen and superheated plasma. The firestorm is heading for the Moon. Koenig reverses course and warns Alpha. Russell asks Koenig for permission to use some tiranium for Michelle's new heart, but Koenig's reply is lost in the storm interference. Verdeschi, the acting commander, allows Russell to take what she needs. Russell assembles a new heart while Verdeschi takes a search party underground to retrieve the Osgoods.

As the Osgoods briefly rest, Patrick has another vision: drawing strength from their love, Michelle rises from her bed and the two of them escape the inferno unharmed. Meanwhile, flares from the firestorm impact the lunar surface, damaging Alpha and causing cave-ins below ground. Transforming into a Bengal tiger, Maya uses her night vision to guide the search team. They reach the Osgoods just after Michelle collapses from exhaustion and before Patrick is buried in a rock fall. While Verdeschi extracts Patrick, Michelle is rushed to Medical and Russell performs the heart transplant. Although the operation is successful, Michelle's vital signs do not improve until Patrick is brought in, injured but stable. In his mind, Patrick watches as the firestorm veers away from the Moon and heads off into space.

As Alpha returns to normal, Russell and Verdeschi speculate that the firestorm had a primal intelligence which was in contact with Patrick's unbalanced mind, explaining his temporary clairvoyance.

== Regular cast ==
- Martin Landau as Commander John Koenig
- Barbara Bain as Dr Helena Russell
- Catherine Schell as Maya
- Tony Anholt as Tony Verdeschi
- Zienia Merton as Sandra Benes
- Jeffery Kissoon as Dr Ben Vincent

== Production ==
"Catacombs of the Moon" is a 'Helena Double-Up' script and was produced simultaneously along with "The AB Chrysalis". Series regulars Barbara Bain, Tony Anholt and Zienia Merton carried the majority of the action. Martin Landau's brief scenes were confined to the Eagle command module; his only interaction with Bain occurred via TV monitor in the epilogue. Catherine Schell's two small contributions amounted to a cameo appearance. The episode is set primarily in the standing Alpha sets with moderate filming in the Stage 'M' cavern sets originally built for "The Metamorph".

This episode featured the return of Zienia Merton after a three-month absence; the actress had left the programme after filming "One Moment of Humanity" because of her reduced involvement (sometimes only a half-day's work) and her new non-contracted 'day-player' status. Merton recounts that Barbara Bain had telephoned and asked if she would consider meeting with Gerry Anderson and Fred Freiberger to discuss her returning to the series. Bain's motivation was that she and Martin Landau would be on holiday for the majority of the shooting of an upcoming episode ("The Beta Cloud"). As this would result in a very brief appearance by the series' stars, the Landaus feared long-term fans would be alienated when tuning in and not seeing any familiar faces from the first series. Guaranteed a more involved role in the series (though still no contract), Merton accepted the offer. From this time forward, her character was referred to on-screen only by the diminutive 'Sahn' (sometimes 'Sahn Benes' in script character lists).

In the shooting script dated 18 May 1976, Koenig's co-pilot, Bill, was supposed to be Astronaut Bill Fraser. Budgetary limitations led to John Hug's replacement with one-off actor Alan Hunter. Early drafts of the script had Helena and Ben Vincent referring to their prosthesis as the 'Bergman' heart, as it was identical to the mechanical heart implanted in the late Victor Bergman. One line of dialogue read 'Victor might have lived forever—given the chance.'

=== Music ===
The score was re-edited from previous Space: 1999 incidental music tracks composed for the second series by Derek Wadsworth and draws primarily from the scores of "The Exiles" and "One Moment of Humanity".

== Reception ==
John Kenneth Muir regarded "Catacombs of the Moon" as the series' worst episode, calling it "a disastrous stinker on every level [...] confused, badly written [and] boring." His criticisms included the "nonsensical" premise of a firestorm in space, which he found to be "a completely arbitrary plot device", as well as the characterisation, remarking that both regular and guest cast are presented as "emotional basket cases". He believed the episode also suffers from the reduced roles given to Commander Koenig and Maya, as well as the absence of other regulars, such as Captain Carter (Nick Tate) and Eagle pilot Bill Fraser (John Hug). He added that "Catacombs of the Moon" leaves the viewer with "so many unanswered questions of motive [...] that this episode just falls apart. If any Space: 1999 episode can truly be accused of being incomprehensible, this is it."

Rating the episode "B-plus", SFX magazine believed "Catacombs of the Moon" to be one of Series 2's "most literate" instalments "despite some dumb dialogue". Giving the episode 7 out of 10, Dreamwatch Bulletin found the plot and performances fair and considered the story "worth watching if just for the brevity of Martin Landau's appearance", also praising the expanded roles given to the supporting characters. TV Zone was critical of Stephenson's role, remarking that the actress "[does] little more than look pasty-faced and whimper occasionally."

== Novelisation ==
The episode was adapted in the second Year Two Space: 1999 novel Mind-Breaks of Space by Michael Butterworth and J. Jeff Jones published in 1977. The authors made minor changes in the story, the most obvious being the two Maya transformation sequences feature decidedly extraterrestrial animals: a long-bodied beast with natural armour plating and trap-like mouth would come to Verdeschi's aid in the explosives storeroom and later, a headless, bipedal bat-creature would use its sonar to navigate the Security team through the darkness of the catacombs. The novel would also give Koenig and Maya more exposure than did the actual shooting script and transformed the character of 'Sahn' into a young Indian man.
