= The Mark of Archanon =

- Space: 1999 episode
- Episode no.: Series 2 Episode 6
- Directed by: Charles Crichton
- Written by: Lew Schwarz
- Editing by: Alan Pattillo
- Production code: SPII 8
- Original air date: 9 October 1976

Guest appearances
- John Standing as Pasc; Michael Gallagher as Etrec; Veronica Lang as Lyra and Maurna; John Alkin as Andy Johnson; Anthony Forrest as Carson; Raul Newney as Dr Raul Nuñez; Annie Lambert as Alphan Operative; Quentin Pierre as Pierce; Terry Walsh as Stuart; Barbara Kelly as Computer Voice

Episode chronology
← Previous "All That Glisters"	Next → "The Taybor"

"The Mark of Archanon" is the sixth episode of the second series of Space: 1999 (and the 30th episode overall of the programme). The screenplay was written by Lew Schwarz; the director was Charles Crichton. The final shooting script is dated 12 April 1976, with amendments dated 21 April, 26 April, 27 April and 28 April 1976. Live action filming took place Tuesday 4 May 1976 through Tuesday 18 May 1976. The episode was first broadcast in the UK on 16 October 1976, having previously aired on KRON-TV, San Francisco on 9 October 1976.

== Plot ==
While surveying a cavern for crystals to maintain the Eagles' air scrubbers, a team of Alphans discover a capsule containing two humanoids in suspended animation – a man and a boy. The capsule bears a mysterious six-pointed mark.

The aliens are extracted. Unseen by the Alphans, the man awakens and reaches for a pick-axe, the mark blazing on his forehead. However, on hearing the boy is safe, he loses consciousness and the mark vanishes. Later reawakening in Alpha's empty Medical Centre, the man, Pasc, rouses the boy – his son Etrec. The boy begs his father to kill him so he never receives the mark, but Pasc cannot bring himself to do it.

Pasc tells the Alphans that their people, the Archanons, outlawed violence and dispatched emissaries throughout the cosmos to teach this philosophy. He was the leader of a team who were sent to Earth and driven to mutiny by the brutality they found there. The other Archanons, including his wife Lyra, forced them into stasis.

In Medical, Dr Russell identifies a virus in both Archanons – dormant in Etrec, but active in Pasc. Elsewhere, technicians open the stasis chamber's power unit and reactivate the transceiver that Pasc used to record his command log. Fearing that the Archanons will use the transceiver to track them down, Pasc tells Etrec they must flee Alpha. While attempting to steal an Eagle, Pasc captures Russell. In response, Controller Verdeschi seizes Etrec and holds him at gunpoint. Each man threatens to kill his respective hostage, but Pasc knows that humans are too weak to kill in cold blood.

Etrec reveals that the virus is a neurological pathogen known as the "killing sickness". He elects to stay on Alpha while Pasc is given an Eagle in exchange for Russell's life. Finding the Eagle's controls deactivated by command override, Pasc threatens to kill Russell unless he is granted safe passage off Alpha with Etrec. During the confusion, Russell blurts out a message that her assistant, Dr Nuñez, interprets as an order to take blood samples from the Archanons.

Carter discovers Etrec in the throes of the virus, his forehead burning with the mark. Attempting to excise it, the boy stabs his own head. Meanwhile, an Archanon spacecraft approaches the Moon and transmits a message to Alpha warning the crew that they are in danger.

Etrec draws attention to the transceiver recordings, in which Lyra explains how Pasc contracted the virus and killed two of their team. As the disease is often passed from father to son, Pasc and Etrec were put in stasis together until a cure could be found.

Using Etrec's blood, Nuñez devises a serum to cure the virus. However, Etrec has suffered fatal blood loss. At Russell's urging, Pasc has his blood transfused into his son, saving Etrec but at the cost of his own life.

Maurna, an Archanon woman aboard the ship, is granted entry to Alpha. She explains that the Archanon body cannot produce blood quickly, so no Archanon could give the amount needed to prepare a serum and survive. Pasc quips that the sickness grants him the privilege of suicide, and dies. Maurna takes Etrec into her care and the Archanons leave Alpha.

== Regular cast ==
- Martin Landau as Commander John Koenig
- Barbara Bain as Dr Helena Russell
- Catherine Schell as Maya
- Tony Anholt as Tony Verdeschi
- Nick Tate as Captain Alan Carter
- John Hug as Astronaut Bill Fraser
- Yasuko Nagazumi as Yasko

== Production ==
With Sir Lew Grade's late renewal order for the second series, a strict ten-month production schedule was imposed by ITC New York. To stay on schedule, producer Fred Freiberger devised the "double-up" concept. Two episodes would be filmed simultaneously by two first-unit companies. The scripts would be written to heavily feature one of the stars; the other would appear in a reduced capacity while working on their own, concurrent story. The supporting cast would also be divided between the two productions.

In the case of this "Helena Double-Up" script, Barbara Bain was the featured star with supporting actors Nick Tate and Tony Anholt joining her for a story set primarily in the standing Moonbase sets on Stage L. Short scenes involving Martin Landau and Catherine Schell were filmed in the Eagle command module, with Landau and Bain appearing together on-screen only in the epilogue. ('The Rules of Luton' was filmed simultaneously on location, with Landau and Schell receiving the majority of the screen time.)

"The Mark of Archanon" shooting script dated 12 April 1976 contained scenes either cut for time or revised by the subsequent amendments: (1) The use of dylenide crystals in the Eagles' air filters was mentioned in dialogue between Carter and Johnson during the hook. (2) The cave-in would be an accident caused by a careless technician; when not in use, the thermal cutter was left turned on and pointing at the ceiling; (3) Carter's use of the nickname "Bluey" for Johnson was explained as Australian slang for people with red hair; (4) The plan to gain access to Pasc's Eagle by burning through the propulsion-tube's inspection hatch with acid was visualised and carried out by two Alphans. This sequence was removed for budgetary reasons; (5) The new character of Raul Nuñez was created when a scheduling conflict would prevent actor Jeffery Kissoon from portraying Ben Vincent, as intended by the script.

The voices of Michael Gallagher (Etrec), John Alkin (Andy Johnson) and Anthony Forrest (Carson) were dubbed by voice-artists speaking with American accents.

=== Music ===
The score was re-edited from previous Space: 1999 incidental music tracks composed for the second series by Derek Wadsworth and draws primarily from the scores of "The Metamorph" and "The Exiles".

== Reception ==
TV Zone magazine considered "The Mark of Archanon" to be one of Series 2's better episodes, noting its substantial role for Nick Tate's Captain Carter. Rating the episode "B-plus", SFX magazine found Tate's performance "particularly good, and his scenes with Michael Gallagher (Etrec) are touching". Giving the episode 9 out of 10, Dreamwatch Bulletin called Gallagher "first class despite his age" and Standing (Pasc) "excellent [...] [his] restrained performance, never going over the top, is responsible for turning this episode of a space opera into 50 minutes of real drama."

Naming the episode "one of Year 2's most successful hours", John Kenneth Muir hailed the "splendid character moments" from Tate and other members of the regular cast. He also praised the characterisation of Pasc and Etrec, stating that they are not mere "two-dimensional cardboard cutouts" like some of Series 2's other aliens, and noting scriptwriter Schwarz's focus on explaining the Archanons' backstory and culture. However, he criticised some of the model effects, arguing that while "Collision Course" feature convincing miniature asteroids, the ones encountered by Koenig and Maya in this episode resemble "balls of crumpled tinfoil".

== Novelisation ==
The episode was adapted in the second Year Two Space: 1999 novel Mind-Breaks of Space by Michael Butterworth and J. Jeff Jones published in 1977. The story would be adapted from the 12 April 1976 shooting script and contained many of the unrevised and deleted items present in this draft.
