= Journey to Where =

- Space: 1999 episode
- Episode no.: Series 2 Episode 3
- Directed by: Tom Clegg
- Written by: Donald James
- Editing by: Mike Campbell
- Production code: SPII 5
- Original air date: 18 September 1976

Guest appearances
- Freddie Jones as Dr Charles Logan; Isla Blair as Carla Cross; Roger Bizley as MacDonald; Laurence Harrington as Tom Jackson; Norwich Duff as First Texas Operative; Peggy Page as Old Crone; Sarah Bullen as Kate; Robert Davies as Maya/Mr Hyde; John Wood as Second Texas Operative; Terry Walsh as Highlander Guard; Robert Reeves as Peter; Jenny Cresswell as Command Center Operative

Episode chronology
← Previous "The Exiles"	Next → "One Moment of Humanity"

"Journey to Where" is the third episode of the second series of Space: 1999 (and the 27th overall episode of the programme). The screenplay was written by Donald James; the director was Tom Clegg. The final shooting script is dated 18 February 1976, with amendments dated 2 March, 4 March, 11 March, 17 March, 18 March, 22 March and 25 March 1976. Live-action filming took place between 1 April and 14 April 1976.

== Plot ==
By 2120, Earth's polluted atmosphere is unbreathable and humanity is forced to reside in pressure domes. In Texas City, scientists led by Dr Logan direct a faster-than-light neutrino transmission at the distant Moon, where the effects of time dilation mean that only a few years have passed since it broke away from Earth. Logan makes contact with the crew of Moonbase Alpha and informs them that the 22nd century has the means to teleport them back to Earth. Time is of the essence: a star cluster is moving between Earth and the Moon and this imminent "galactic eclipse" will cut off communication for nearly a century.

The Alphans construct a teleportation device from Logan's schematics. As a test, an instrument package is beamed over from Alpha and re‑materialises in Texas City. Commander Koenig, Dr Russell and Captain Carter prepare to make the first live run. Just before teleport, Texas City is hit by an earthquake, and although the transfer completes, the three Alphans fail to re-materialise. Their wrist-worn health monitors are still transmitting, indicating that wherever they are, they are alive. Logan tries recover them by repeating the teleport while using explosives to re‑create the earthquake. There is still no sign of the trio, but Logan's equipment indicates they are somewhere on Earth – even though the surface is uninhabitable.

Koenig, Russell and Carter have arrived in a forest glen. They are captured by sword-wielding humanoids and imprisoned in a cave. Something else is threatening Russell: Alpha's sterile environment has softened their immune systems and she is growing feverish with suspected viral pneumonia. She identifies a fungus and tells Koenig and Carter to collect some, believing that it could be used to treat her. Koenig and Carter overpower their captors and the trio escape. While treating Russell, the men realise that the moon in the sky is "their" Moon, meaning they are on Earth at some point in the past.

Russell's condition improves. The Alphans' wrist monitors start flashing, suggesting that Alpha is trying to contact them. Before they can respond, they are captured by soldiers led by the laird of Clan MacDonald. They learn that they are in Scotland at New Year, 25 years after the Battle of Bannockburn.

Believing the Alphans to be English noblemen, MacDonald leads them to his New Year's banquet. Without the fungus, Russell deteriorates. Koenig begins tapping Morse code on his monitor's control stud, relaying their space‑time coordinates in the hope they will be transported back to the present. MacDonald confiscates the monitor. When Russell loses consciousness, MacDonald condemns the Alphans as plague carriers and orders them burned to death. As the execution begins, Koenig reaches for Russell's monitor and tries to finish his message.

Thirty minutes before the eclipse, Alpha and Logan have given up on the trio when Alpha picks up Morse code: "Scotland ... New Year ... Bannockburn plus twenty-five." Logan calculates the teleportation target date as 25 March 1339. The transfer is initiated and Koenig, Russell and Carter re-materialise on Alpha. Russell recovers and the Alphans bid Logan farewell before losing contact with Earth.

== Regular cast ==
- Martin Landau as Commander John Koenig
- Barbara Bain as Dr Helena Russell
- Catherine Schell as Maya
- Tony Anholt as Tony Verdeschi
- Nick Tate as Captain Alan Carter
- Jeffery Kissoon as Dr Ben Vincent
- Yasuko Nagazumi as Yasko

== Production ==
The final shooting script contained the characters of Sandra Benes (with her being known by the 'Sahn' diminutive for the first time) and Bob Mathias; however both Zienia Merton and Anton Phillips had left the production by that time (due to lessened involvement and lower salaries in the second series). They were replaced by Japanese actress Yasuko Nagazumi, playing the new character Yasko, and Jeffery Kissoon, assuming the new role of Doctor Ben Vincent. Nagazumi was, at that time, the wife of veteran Space: 1999 director Ray Austin and had been featured in the previous Anderson live-action production, The Protectors. Other major changes would involve the relocation of MacDonald's clan. The original script had them living in a village, with the laird headquartered in a great house and the Alphans attempted immolation occurring in a wooden hut. Budget restrictions would see them moved into the cavern sets constructed for "The Metamorph".

This episode would feature the first of several outdoor shoots for the second series. Both Martin Landau and Barbara Bain objected to leaving the confines of Pinewood Studios, so a studio paddock on the back lot became the Scottish Highlands. MacDonald and his clansmen would dress in costumes originally created for Roman Polanski's 1971 feature film version of Macbeth. Isla Blair, the actress portraying Carla, had appeared in the first-series episode "War Games" under heavy make-up as the female alien. The Alphans' test instrument was revamped from an Ariel satellite seen in "The Last Sunset".

Actor Freddie Jones was casting director Lesley de Pettitt's first choice for the role of Charles Logan. Others considered were Ronnie Barker, Colin Blakely, T. P. McKenna, Clive Revill and Patrick Troughton. Other contenders for clan laird MacDonald were Peter Jeffrey and Nigel Davenport. The old crone (played by Peggy Page) who would manacle Koenig and company to the dungeon wall was added by director Tom Clegg. He gave her the backstory of having contracted and recovered from the Plague, thus making her the only clan member to not fear touching the presumably infected prisoners.

The actual date for New Year's Day 1339 was 25 March as the Gregorian calendar (which defines the first day of each year as 1 January) was not observed in Scotland until 1600 (and 1752 in England).

=== Music ===
The score was re-edited from previous Space: 1999 incidental music tracks composed for the second series by Derek Wadsworth and draws primarily from the scores of "The Metamorph" and especially "The Exiles".

== Reception ==
SFX magazine rated the episode "A-minus", describing Blair and Jones' performances as "delightful" and the story as a whole "highly entertaining and enjoyable". Commentator James O'Neill gave it 3 stars out of 4. Dreamwatch Bulletin gave 7 out 10, comparing the feel of the episode to a Dungeons & Dragons or Lost in Space adventure, but with greater tension. TV Zone described "Journey to Where" as "generally [...] a sound episode" but noted a "battle of the fake accents" among the guest cast – Bizley portraying an "all-too-English" Scottish laird from the past, and Blair and Jones a pair of future Texans.

== Novelisation ==
The episode was adapted in the sixth Year Two Space: 1999 novel The Edge of the Infinite by Michael Butterworth published in 1977. This novel was not released in the United Kingdom and only as a limited edition in the United States and Germany.

The original German-published novel Der Stahlplanet (The Steel Planet) would provide a sequel to this story as, after a course change, the Moon moves beyond the eclipsing star cluster and contact is re-established with Earth. The Alphans are ultimately transported home, concluding the Space: 1999 narrative.
