= Seed of Destruction =

Seed of Destruction may refer to:

- "Seed of Destruction" (Space: 1999), the 13th episode of the second series of Space: 1999
- Hellboy: Seed of Destruction, the first Hellboy story arc
- EverQuest: Seeds of Destruction, an expansion to the MMORPG Everquest
