= The Taybor =

- Space: 1999 episode
- Episode no.: Series 2 Episode 7
- Directed by: Bob Brooks
- Written by: Thom Keyes
- Cinematography by: Frank Watts
- Editing by: Alan Killick
- Production code: SPII 6
- Original air date: 25 September 1976

Cast
- Martin Landau as Commander Koenig; Barbara Bain as Dr Russell; Catherine Schell as Maya; Tony Anholt as Controller Verdeschi; Jeffery Kissoon as Dr Vincent; John Hug as Pilot Fraser; Yasuko Nagazumi as Yasko; Willoughby Goddard as Taybor; Rita Webb as the haggish Maya; Vicki Michelle as Barbara; Chai Lee as an Alphan

Episode chronology
← Previous "The Mark of Archanon"	Next → "Brian the Brain"

"The Taybor" is the seventh episode of the second series of Space: 1999, a 1970s British science fiction television series produced by Gerry Anderson Productions for ITC Entertainment. Written by Thom Keyes and directed by Bob Brooks, it was filmed at Pinewood Studios in April and May 1976 and first broadcast by KRON-TV in the United States on 25 September 1976.

Opening in 1999, the series follows the crew of lunar colony Moonbase Alpha after a nuclear explosion pushes the Moon out of Earth orbit and into interstellar space. Unable to control the rogue planet's trajectory, the Alphans encounter various astronomical phenomena and alien civilisations as they search for a way back to Earth or a new world to settle on. In "The Taybor", Alpha is visited by a passing alien merchant called Taybor (played by Willoughby Goddard), whose spacecraft is equipped with a faster-than-light drive. Taybor is willing to share the technology with the Alphans but demands Maya's lifelong companionship in return. The episode has received a mixed critical response.

== Plot ==
Strangely shaped objects appear all over Moonbase Alpha. When personnel pick them up, they are either blinded or left comatose. Dr Russell hopes that their conditions are not permanent. Suddenly the Command Center viewscreen is lit up with a rainbow of colours. A booming male voice requests permission to land. When Commander Koenig asks the caller to identify himself, the view switches to a brightly coloured spaceship which has landed nearby. A rotund alien materialises in Command Center. He cheerfully introduces himself as the merchant Taybor, master of the SS Emporium.

Taybor is immediately fascinated by the Psychon shapeshifter Maya. The other Alphans find his manner endearing, especially after he assures them that their colleagues have come to no lasting harm. Controller Verdeschi is pleased when Taybor enthusiastically samples his home brew, which his fellow Alphans cannot stand. Over dinner, Taybor discusses the Emporium's means of faster-than-light propulsion: the "jump drive", which enables it travel through hyperspace. Koenig wants to know how such a drive is built, but Taybor confesses ignorance of the subject. Koenig asks Taybor to transport them all to Earth, offering the Moon itself in exchange. Taybor agrees, but Maya is unhappy with the idea because Earth is not her homeworld.

It quickly becomes clear that Taybor is unable to locate Earth. He invites Koenig to join him aboard the Emporium, which holds a collection of alien artefacts that Taybor has spent years acquiring. After showing Koenig the jump drive, Taybor takes them into hyperspace. He threatens to deposit Koenig at an alien zoo, leading Koenig to draw his laser sidearm and hold Taybor at gunpoint. Taybor retracts the threat, saying he was only joking, and returns them to Alpha. He states his terms: Maya for the jump drive. As a compromise, Koenig offers a duplicate of Maya which can converse with Taybor and will never age. Taybor agrees.

Russell builds a robot double of Maya which delights Taybor. While assembling the jump drive plans, he finds the time to trade with the Alphans and gives Russell some perfume as a present. However, he has no intention of honouring his side of the agreement: after giving the real Maya a necklace that erases her memory, he abducts her and takes off in the Emporium. The Alphans are unable to follow as they are temporarily overwhelmed by the extremely powerful scent of Russell's perfume. Taybor contacts Alpha and taunts his victims, then teleports the Maya robot back to Command Center, where it explodes.

Maya removes the necklace and regains her memory. Realising that she has been kidnapped, she repeatedly shapeshifts to fight and terrify Taybor. Eventually she morphs into a haggish female imitation of Taybor and he surrenders, not wanting to spend the rest of his life with her in that form. He returns Maya to Alpha, along with everything he acquired from the Alphans, then departs, taking the secrets of hyperspace travel with him.

== Production ==
"The Taybor" was the first TV episode directed by Bob Brooks, a former commercials director. The script was by Thom Keyes, a novelist who previously wrote the Colditz episode "Frogs in the Well" (1974). Regular character Captain Carter (Nick Tate) was written to appear, but was replaced by pilot Bill Fraser (John Hug) before shooting began. The script described the appearance that Maya takes on (played by Rita Webb) to disgust Taybor as "a gross, slatternly woman – maybe 250 pounds of grinning, half-toothless hag – an exaggerated female counterpart of Taybor".

The episode was filmed at Pinewood Studios between 15 April and 3 May 1976. The Moonbase Alpha dining room set featured chairs that previously appeared in the Series 1 episode "Mission of the Darians", and before that the James Bond film The Man with the Golden Gun (1974). Alpha's recreation centre was a redress of the Medical section and contained gym apparatus originally seen in "The Testament of Arkadia". The SS Emporium miniature model was built by an outside contractor and measured 71 by 56 centimetres (2 feet 4 inches by 1 foot 10 inches).

The incidental music was recorded on 2 July 1976 at The Music Centre in Wembley, London.

== Broadcast ==
The episode first aired on 25 September 1976 on KRON-TV in San Francisco. In the UK, it was first broadcast on 4 November 1976 on Associated Television. Yorkshire Television promoted "The Taybor" as a Christmas special when it first screened the episode on 22 December 1977.

== Reception ==
Commander Koenig actor Martin Landau described "The Taybor" as "a very interesting episode, all the while being terribly menacing". He compared the eponymous Taybor to "a travelling medicine man from the Old West. He is a con man, a magician, and a huckster of a certain kind with a lot of flamboyance".

Critics gave "The Taybor" mixed reviews. Ranking it among Series 2's better episodes, John Kenneth Muir considered it a "light-hearted and enjoyable romp" and a "welcome change" from Series 2's more action-heavy instalments. He appreciated the episode's humour and "delightful character scenes", such as Taybor coming to dinner. Although he found Goddard's manner of speech hard to understand, he thought that the actor's costuming and makeup were "as memorable as his great comedic presence".

TV Zone described the episode as "pretty lightweight stuff" that offers "a certain charm", despite some "crass" humour. It called the design aspects "as over-the-top as Goddard's performance". DreamWatch Bulletin rated it 6 out of 10, calling the acting hammy and "frankly [...] embarrassing". SFX magazine gave "The Taybor" a D-minus grade, describing it as an episode "that only a Lost in Space fan could love" and "complete crap".
