= One Moment of Humanity =

- Space: 1999 episode
- Episode no.: Series 2 Episode 4
- Directed by: Charles Crichton
- Written by: Tony Barwick
- Editing by: Mike Campbell
- Production code: SPII 3
- Original air date: 25 September 1976

Guest appearances
- Billie Whitelaw as Zamara; Leigh Lawson as Zarl; Geoffrey Bayldon as Number 8; Robert Reeves as Peter; Sarah Bullen as Kate

Episode chronology
← Previous "Journey to Where"	Next → "All That Glisters"

"One Moment of Humanity" is the fourth episode of the second series of Space: 1999 (and the 28th overall episode of the programme). The screenplay was written by Tony Barwick; the director was Charles Crichton. The original title was "One Second of Humanity". The final shooting script is dated 12 February 1976. Live-action filming took place Thursday 4 March 1976 through Wednesday 17 March 1976.

== Plot ==
Moonbase Alpha experiences a power loss that makes the crew light-headed, then immobile. A humanoid female materialises in Command Center and notices Dr Russell and Controller Verdeschi, frozen in place while holding each other up. Lifting the crew's paralysis, she identifies herself as Zamara of the ice planet Vega and reveals that Alpha is being held in a force field. Two Alphans must go back to Vega with her. She chooses Russell and Verdeschi, believing them to be lovers, and teleports them to a Vegan city.

Russell encounters a masked humanoid wearing a suit marked "8". A man called Zarl tells her that it is one of the "Numbers" – the Vegans' robot servants. Number 8 quietly warns Russell that the Vegans will kill her if she shows aggression. Meeting more Numbers, Russell and Verdeschi discover it is they who are the flesh-and-blood Vegans, while Zamara and Zarl's kind are the robots.

Eight explains that when Vega suffered ecological collapse, its people built service robots linked to a master computer. The computer designed better robots, which built better computers. The result was a race of sentient androids who enslaved the Vegans. Although the androids intend to kill their former masters, they cannot, because the Vegans' masks mean they have never seen anger. They incite violence in an effort to gain the necessary skill.

Russell and Verdeschi find that the master computer is protected by an energy field. When Zarl and Zamara arrive, the humans explain that they are worried about Alpha and are trying to go back. The androids tell them simply to wish it. They do, and find themselves back on Alpha – which is deserted. Discovering that the Moon has travelled light-years, they theorise that they have timewarped into the future after the rest of the Alphans left for Vega. They try to wish their return, but nothing happens.

Unknown to them, the androids have placed them in a facsimile of Alpha to psychologically break them. Russell is manipulated into thinking that Verdeschi drugged her coffee; Verdeschi, that Russell sabotaged the life support. Both are provoked to murderous rage, but realise they are being tested and refuse to kill each other.

Zamara returns to the real Alpha and searches its databases for literature about humans being driven to kill. She hits upon Othello. Koenig tells her that staging Shakespeare's play with Russell and Verdeschi will not work, as they are not lovers. He reveals that he is Russell's lover and claims that Maya is Verdeschi's. Zamara teleports both of them back with her.

Zarl, playing Iago, will seduce Russell/Desdemona, and Koenig/Othello's jealousy will compel him to murder. The seduction begins, with Zarl leading Russell in a provocative dance. Eventually he kisses Russell. Unable to contain his anger, Koenig floors Zarl.

Elated, Zarl sets out to kill Koenig. The Alphans realise that the androids' weakness is their interlinked consciousness: if one fails, they all fail. Russell urges Zarl to become fully human by giving in to love. The emotional intensity is too much for the androids: Zarl collapses and the rest shut down. The Numbers come out of hiding. Before expiring, Zarl declares that he felt love. Russell replies that it is worth oblivion to have experienced one moment of humanity.

== Regular cast ==
- Martin Landau as Commander John Koenig
- Barbara Bain as Dr Helena Russell
- Catherine Schell as Maya
- Tony Anholt as Tony Verdeschi
- Nick Tate as Captain Alan Carter
- Zienia Merton as Sandra Benes

== Production ==
The shooting script, written by former UFO script editor Tony Barwick, contains an epilogue cut for time from the final edit. In the epilogue, a restored Alpha dispatches a recovery Eagle, and Alan Carter arrives on Vega with cold-weather gear for Koenig and company. With the Vegan city powered down, the Alphans discuss the future with the Numbers, who are looking forward to re-learning the basics of survival in their world's harsh environment. Helena and Koenig exchange banter regarding Zarl; though the android was a good-looking and masculine Iago, Helena states she much prefers her Othello. The script's status-report date is stated as 415 days by Helena and was changed in post-production.

After completing this episode, series regular Zienia Merton decided to leave the programme. She was dissatisfied with her lack of a contract and diminished involvement in the second series. Feeling the new producer Fred Freiberger did not appreciate her contribution to the previous series and not seeing any potential change in the foreseeable future, she opted to depart. During her absence, her character was replaced by Japanese operative Yasko. Yasko was portrayed by Yasuko Nagazumi, the wife of Space: 1999 director Ray Austin.

Coming off her critically acclaimed, award-winning performance as Mrs Baylock in the 1976 horror film The Omen, Billie Whitelaw was cast as the sensuously diabolical android Zamara. A veteran of British theatre, her stage-trained voice had to be modulated in post-production to prevent it from overwhelming all other elements of the soundtrack.

Costume designer Emma Porteous recalls how she and production designer Keith Wilson closely collaborated to produce a cohesive look for the beautiful and sensual world of Vega. The sets for this production were revamped from the Grove of Psyche, the corridors of Psychon and the caverns left over from "The Metamorph". The red nylon quilted jackets introduced in "Dragon's Domain" were worn by Catherine Schell and background extra Robert Reeves.

A large quantity of publicity stills for the second series were taken during the filming of this episode. The regular cast, alone or in combinations, were photographed in a variety of action poses involving attacking aliens. Among these aliens were stuntmen dressed in the Vegan android costume and 'Number' costume, a Highlander from "Journey to Where" and stuntman Frank Maher in his Decontamination Unit coverall from "The Exiles", his face smeared with grey greasepaint.

Apart from simple laser-beam overlays, teleportation energy-flares and one big-screen shot with a burn-in of the star-chart showing the before-and-after positions of the Moon, there are no substantial visual effects in this episode. Verdeschi's POV shot of the surface of Vega and the single shot of the planet over Moonbase Alpha were library footage both taken from the first-series episode "Death's Other Dominion".

=== Music ===
An original score was composed for this episode by Derek Wadsworth. The second movement of Beethoven's 'Symphony No. 9 in D minor' was played by Zamara in the Alpha recreation room. 'Storm at Sun-Up' by Canadian jazz composer Gino Vannelli, was selected by choreographer Lionel Blair to accompany the seduction dance during filming, and served as Wadsworth's inspiration when preparing his score. A brief moment of the 'space horror music' composed by Vic Elmes and Alan Willis for "Ring Around the Moon" can be heard when Zarl takes Helena's hand and says, 'The play begins.' This is the only occurrence of a first-series music-track being used this year.

== Reception ==
TV Zone magazine called the episode a "powerful story", praising the characterisations and Whitelaw's performance in particular. SFX gave it a "B" grade, describing it as good overall with an "unusually downbeat ending". Rating the episode 8 out of 10, Dreamwatch Bulletin praised the "strong, simple plot" as well as Bayldon's performance: "as always, he is able to add a little pathos to his role." Reviewer Anthony McKay also complimented the direction, remarking that Crichton could "make even the most preposterous idea seem quite credible, such as the Vegans not noticing when Maya transforms herself into a parrot." He concluded that "[a]s far as originality goes, this memorable episode is as good as they come."

John Kenneth Muir wrote that while the episode "has a great deal in its favour", including "strong character interaction" and good villains, it is let down by certain plot elements which are less than credible, such as the androids being able to create a perfect replica of Alpha and teleport themselves or others by mere thought. He also considered the ending "as hackneyed as one can get in science fiction", noting other TV episodes in which androids short-circuit in the face of emotion.

Journalist and Space: 1999 fan Shaqui Le Vesconte commented that the episode "switches expectations between the beautiful Vegans and their automaton, called Numbers, even if it mixes plot elements of Star Trek's 'The Mark of Gideon', with Helena and Tony transported to a deserted Alpha, and 'I, Mudd', with androids immobilised by illogical input." James F. Iaccino of Benedictine University argued that besides "I, Mudd", the episode is heavily influenced by Star Trek's "What Are Little Girls Made Of?" and "Requiem for Methuselah" – both episodes in which androids are destroyed by experiencing human emotion. Jay Allen Sanford praised the use of Vannelli's music but called the episode "another blatant Trek swipe", likening the premise to that of "Plato's Stepchildren".

== Novelisation ==
The episode was adapted in the second Year Two Space: 1999 novel Mind-Breaks of Space by Michael Butterworth and J. Jeff Jones published in 1977. It included the deleted epilogue scene.
