= The AB Chrysalis =

- Space: 1999 episode
- Episode no.: Series 2 Episode 12
- Directed by: Val Guest
- Written by: Tony Barwick
- Cinematography by: Brendan J. Stafford
- Editing by: Alan Killick
- Production code: SPII 12
- Original air date: 6 November 1976

Cast
- Martin Landau as Commander John Koenig; Barbara Bain as Dr Helena Russell; Catherine Schell as Maya; Nick Tate as Captain Alan Carter; Yasuko Nagazumi as Yasko; Ina Skriver as "A"; Sarah Douglas as "B"; Robert Rietti as the voice of the probes; David Sebastian Bach as the Guardian's brother; Harry Fielder and Pat Gorman as Alphans

Episode chronology
← Previous "Seed of Destruction"	Next → "Catacombs of the Moon"

"The AB Chrysalis" is the 12th episode of the second series of Space: 1999, a 1970s British science fiction television series produced by Gerry Anderson Productions for ITC Entertainment. Written by Tony Barwick and directed by Val Guest, it was filmed at Pinewood Studios in June and July 1976 and first broadcast by KRON-TV, San Francisco on 6 November 1976.

Opening in 1999, the series follows the crew of lunar colony Moonbase Alpha after a nuclear explosion pushes the Moon out of Earth orbit and into interstellar space. Unable to control the rogue planet's trajectory, the Alphans encounter various astronomical phenomena and alien civilisations as they search for a way back to Earth or a new world to settle on. In "The AB Chrysalis", a team led by Commander Koenig investigates a planetary system which is producing shockwaves that threaten to destroy Alpha. In an underground habitat, they meet a highly technological civilisation of chlorine-breathing humanoids and sentient machines.

== Plot ==
The Moon is being hit by increasingly powerful shockwaves that recur every 12 hours. They are originating from massive explosions on a nearby planet and appear to be deliberately targeted at the Moon. The Alphans theorise that it is a defence mechanism of a hostile civilisation, warning them not to approach. However, if the shockwaves continue, Alpha will be destroyed.

Commander Koenig, Maya, and Captain Carter depart in an Eagle to investigate. The planet has a chlorine atmosphere and many moons. Landing on the nearest moon, the Alphans find no people, only balloon-shaped buildings. Koenig finds a cavern filled with spheres on stands. One of the spheres bounces to a different stand and a screen begins displaying charts of nearby space: Koenig realises that the spheres are sentient machines and are trying to communicate with him. When he draws a plan of the Solar System, the machines determine that he is from Earth and a voice greets him in English. Koenig explains the situation, but the machines cannot shut down the planet's defences unless ordered by their organic "Masters", who are on the planet waiting to be "reborn".

The Alphans fly to the planet, landing on a platform which lowers them into its depths. They disembark into another sphere chamber where the atmosphere has been replaced with oxygen and nitrogen. The voice returns, identifying itself as Voice Probe 748. It explains that instead of dying, aged Masters go into chrysalises from which they emerge rejuvenated. They are led by "the Guardian", who is in his chlorine-filled chrysalis and about to enter the rejuvenation chamber. Koenig makes a plea to the senile Guardian, who lacks the capacity to respond. Attempting to stop the moving chrysalis, Carter accidentally breaks its seal and nearly suffocates everyone. The Alphans retreat to the Eagle while 748 floods the room with chlorine to save the Guardian.

Koenig threatens to fire the Eagle's lasers on the rejuvenation chamber unless he is given a hearing. Two women emerge from their chrysalises. They announce that their names are untranslatable, so the Alphans may call them "A" and "B". "A" is attracted to Koenig and votes to save Alpha, while "B", noticing "A"'s infatuation, votes against. A third being must rise to cast the deciding vote. However, as he is the brother of the Guardian, he is unlikely to spare the Alphans. Maya calculates that if the next explosion is delayed by a few hours, the Moon will be far enough away to withstand the shockwave. However, it will also be beyond the range of the Eagle.

The awakened brother of the Guardian judges humanity to be a threat and sides with "B". He invites the Alphans to stay on the planet, but they decline and take off for the Moon, even though it is too far away and the Eagle will be destroyed by the shockwave. The explosion occurs – but the Eagle and Alpha survive the shockwave, which gives the Eagle the speed it needs to catch up with the Moon. Maya reasons that their resolve persuaded the aliens to weaken the last explosion.

== Production ==
The episode's working title was "The Chrysalis A-B-C". It was filmed at Pinewood Studios over 13 days in June and July 1976. The voice probes' jumping was achieved by filming the fibreglass props at high speed and reversing the footage. David Sebastian Bach, who played the brother of the Guardian, is a five-times great-grandson of the composer Bach.

"The AB Chrysalis" was one of Series 2's "double-up stories": episodes that were written to sideline different members of the regular cast so that they could be shot in pairs, simultaneously on separate stages. This was intended to shorten Series 2's filming schedule and prevent it from finishing over-time and over-budget like Series 1. The principal photography of "The AB Chrysalis" coincided with that of "Catacombs of the Moon". To allow the two episodes to be filmed in tandem, "The AB Chrysalis" gave Dr Russell (played by Barbara Bain) a reduced role, while omitting Controller Verdeschi (Tony Anholt) entirely. Both characters had major roles in "Catacombs of the Moon".

== Reception ==
"The AB Chrysalis" has received mainly positive reviews. Several commentators praised the concept of the spherical, sentient voice probes. TV Zone magazine considered the episode "great stuff", applauding it for "[restoring] some of the mystery and enigma that had been a trademark of [Space: 1999's] first series". Reviewer Richard Houldsworth also called the voice probes "a joy". SFX liked the "unexpected" ending and graded the episode "A-minus". SciFiNow.co.uk called the episode "perhaps Series 2's finest hour", praising its "refreshingly unorthodox depiction" of the Masters' culture and its "clear, tight storyline". In contrast, DreamWatch Bulletin said that the episode has "very little going for it" and rated it 5 out of 10.

John Kenneth Muir preferred this episode to "One Moment of Humanity", which was also written by Barwick. He praised the script for its alien world, which he found original for having a non-Earth-like atmosphere and sentient machines that use maps and shapes to overcome their initial language barrier with the Alphans. (However, he also viewed the last of these plot points as a strain on credibility.) Muir also appreciated the script's unforced character humour, as well as Landau's performance, which he thought "[added] deeper layers to Koenig's personality." His sole criticism was the "hokey" costume design of a chlorine-breathing alien into which Maya briefly shapeshifts. In a later review, he called the episode "colourful, suspenseful, and highly imaginative". He thought it one of Series 2's best, commenting that the story is aided by its succession of "mini-action sequences or climaxes. The story hops from dramatic moment to dramatic moment with aplomb, and shows how an action format, handled well, could have been applied successfully to the series overall."
