= Space: 1999 =

British science fiction TV series (1975–1977)

- Series 1 title
- Genre: Science fiction
- Created by: Gerry and Sylvia Anderson
- Starring: Martin Landau; Barbara Bain; Barry Morse; Catherine Schell
- Music by: Barry Gray (Series 1); Vic Elmes (Series 1); Derek Wadsworth (Series 2)
- Country of origin: United Kingdom
- Original language: English
- No. of series: 2
- No. of episodes: 48 (list of episodes)

Production
- Executive producer: Gerry Anderson
- Producers: Sylvia Anderson (Series 1); Fred Freiberger (Series 2)
- Cinematography: Frank Watts; Brendan J. Stafford
- Editors: Derek Hyde Chambers; Mike Campbell; Alan Killick; Alan Pattillo; Bill Blunden; Archie Ludski; Ray Lovejoy
- Running time: 52 minutes (Series 1); 48 minutes (Series 2)
- Production companies: Group Three Productions (Series 1); Gerry Anderson Productions (Series 2)
- Budget: £2.8 million (Series 1); £4 million (Series 2)

Original release
- Network: ITV
- Release: 4 September 1975 – 12 November 1977

Space: 1999 is a British science fiction television programme that ran for two series from 1975 to 1977. It was first telecast on Australia's Channel 7 Melbourne, starting on 28 July 1975. The programme, set in the year 1999, follows the 311 inhabitants of Moonbase Alpha, which is hurtling uncontrollably into space due to an explosion of nuclear waste stored on the Moon's far side.

Space: 1999 was the final production by the partnership of Gerry and Sylvia Anderson and was, at the time, the most expensive series produced for British television, with a combined £6.8 million budget. The first series was co-produced by ITC Entertainment and Italian broadcaster RAI, while the second was produced solely by ITC.

== Storyline ==
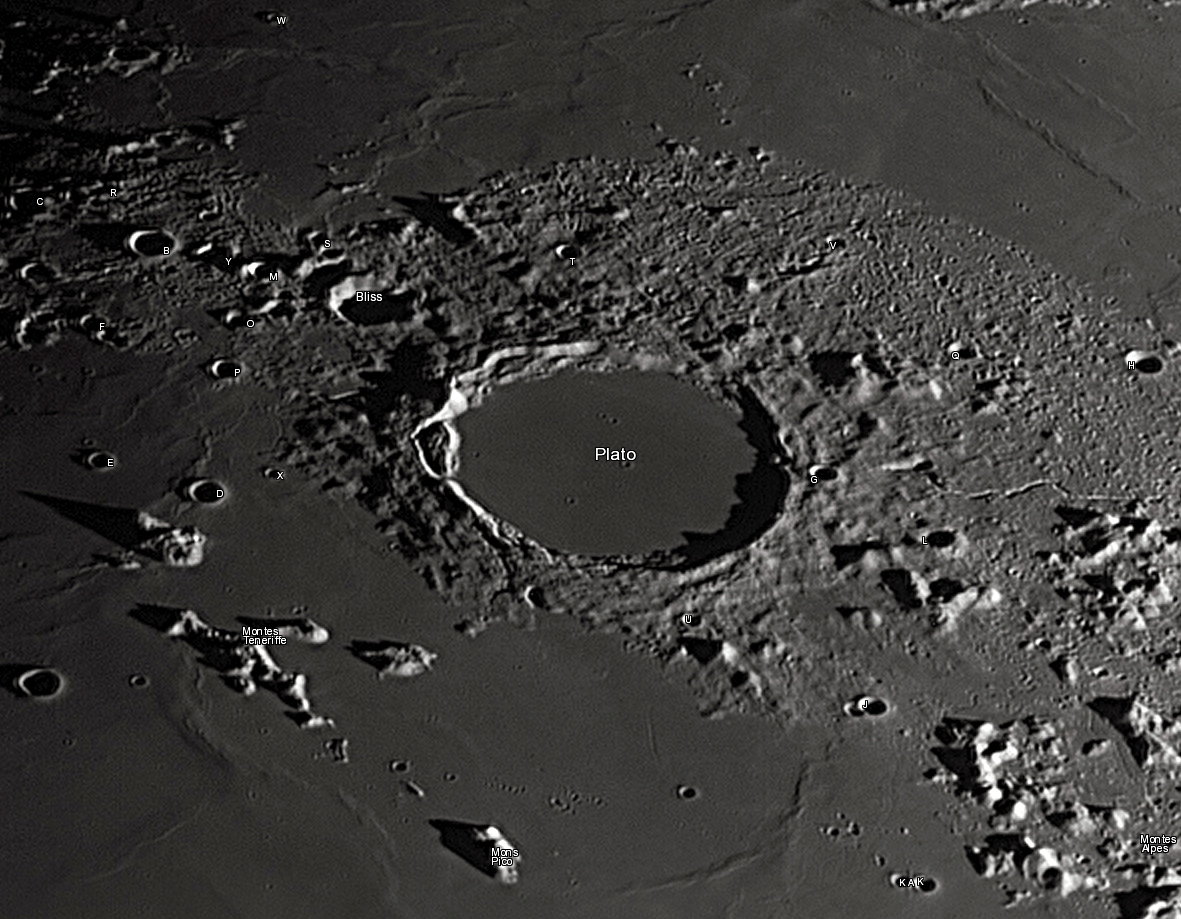
The crater Plato in the Mare Imbrium, the location of Moonbase Alpha in the series

The premise of Space: 1999 centres on the plight of the inhabitants of Moonbase Alpha, a scientific research centre located within the crater Plato in the Moon's northern hemisphere. Humanity had been storing its nuclear waste in vast disposal sites on the far side of the Moon, but when an unknown form of "magnetic radiation" is detected, the accumulated waste reaches critical mass and causes a massive thermonuclear explosion on 13 September 1999. The force of the blast propels the Moon like an enormous booster rocket, hurling it out of Earth orbit and into deep space at colossal speed, stranding the 311 personnel stationed on Alpha.

The runaway Moon, in effect, becomes the "spacecraft" on which the protagonists travel, searching for a new home. Not long after leaving Earth's Solar System, the wandering Moon passes through a black hole and later through a couple of "space warps" which push it even further out into the universe. During their interstellar journey, the Alphans encounter an array of alien civilisations, dystopian societies, and mind-bending phenomena previously unseen by humanity. Several episodes of the first series hinted that the Moon's journey was influenced, and perhaps initiated by, a "mysterious unknown force" which was guiding the Alphans toward an ultimate destiny. The second series used simpler action-oriented plots.

The first series of Space: 1999 used a "teaser" introduction, sometimes called a "hook" or "cold open". This was followed by a title sequence that managed to convey prestige for its two main stars, Landau and Bain, both billed as 'starring', and to give the audience some thirty-plus fast-cut shots of the forthcoming episode. This opening sequence also duplicated that of Landau and Bain's previous television series, Mission: Impossible. The second series eliminated this montage. The programme had four ten-to-twelve minute long acts, allowing for commercial breaks in North America. It finished with a short, and, in the second series, often light-hearted epilogue scene.

== Cast ==
The headline stars of Space: 1999 were American actors Martin Landau and Barbara Bain, who were married to each other at the time and had previously appeared together in Mission: Impossible. To appeal to the American television market and sell the series to one of the major American networks, Landau and Bain were cast at the insistence of Lew Grade over the objections of Sylvia Anderson, who wanted British actors.

Also appearing as regular cast members were the Canadian-based British actor Barry Morse (as Professor Victor Bergman in the first series) and Hungarian-born, American-raised Catherine Schell, as the alien Maya in the second series. Before moving into the role of Maya during the second series, Catherine Schell had guest-starred as a different character in the Year One episode "Guardian of Piri".

The programme also brought Australian actor Nick Tate to public attention. Roy Dotrice appeared in the first episode as Commissioner Simmonds and at the end of the episode it appeared that he would be a regular character. By the second (transmitted) episode the character vanished, reappearing partway through the first series in the episode "Earthbound", his only other appearance on the show, in which it is implied that he dies from asphyxia inside an alien spacecraft.

Over its two series, the programme featured guest appearances from Christopher Lee, Margaret Leighton, Joan Collins, Jeremy Kemp, Peter Cushing, Judy Geeson, Julian Glover, Ian McShane, Leo McKern, Billie Whitelaw, Richard Johnson, Patrick Troughton, Peter Bowles, Sarah Douglas, David Prowse, Isla Blair, Stuart Damon, Peter Duncan, Lynne Frederick, Vicki Michelle and Brian Blessed. (Blair, Damon and Blessed each appeared in two episodes portraying different characters.)

=== Main cast list ===
Year One Characters. Main Deck left to right: Victor Bergman (seated), Alan Carter, Helena Russell, John Koenig, Paul Morrow (seated), Sandra Benes, David Kano. Upper Deck, Not fully identified: Tanya Alexander (third from right).

Year Two Characters. Left to right: Helena Russell, John Koenig, Maya, Tony Verdeschi, Alan Carter.

Actor name	Character name and profession	Number of episodes	Series One	Series Two
Barbara Bain	Dr Helena Russell, head of Medical Section	48	Yes	Yes
Martin Landau	Commander John Koenig, leader of Moonbase Alpha	47	Yes	Yes
Nick Tate	Captain Alan Carter, third in command, chief pilot	45	Yes	Yes
Zienia Merton	Sandra Benes, data analyst	37	Yes	Yes
Anton Phillips	Dr Bob Mathias, deputy medical officer	24	Yes	Yes
Barry Morse	Professor Victor Bergman, science adviser	24	Yes	No
Catherine Schell	Servant of the Guardian of Piri (series 1, episode 11); Maya, science officer – a metamorph rescued from planet Psychon (entire series 2)	25	Yes	Yes
Prentis Hancock	Paul Morrow, base second in command and Main Mission controller	23	Yes	No
Clifton Jones	David Kano, computer operations officer	23	Yes	No
Tony Anholt	Tony Verdeschi: second in command, head of Security, Command Center controller	23	No	Yes
Suzanne Roquette	Tanya Alexander, base operations officer	19	Yes	No
John Hug	Bill Fraser, Eagle pilot	9	No	Yes
Yasuko Nagazumi	Yasko, data analyst	8	No	Yes
Jeffery Kissoon	Dr Ben Vincent, deputy medical officer	7	No	Yes
Sam Dastor	Dr Ed Spencer, medical officer	3	No	Yes
Alibe Parsons	Alibe, data analyst	3	No	Yes

== Production ==
=== Conception and development ===
Space: 1999 was the last in a long line of science-fiction series that Gerry and Sylvia Anderson produced as a working partnership, beginning with Supercar in the early 1960s. In 1972, Sir Lew Grade, head of ITC Entertainment, proposed financing a second series of the Century 21 production UFO to show-runners Gerry and Sylvia Anderson. Grade had one stipulation: the new series would be set primarily on the Moon within the environs of an expanded SHADO Moonbase; the ratings indicated the Moon-centric episodes had proved the most popular with audiences. The Andersons and their team revamped the production, flashing ahead nearly twenty years for UFO: 1999 with Commander Ed Straker and the forces of SHADO fighting their alien foes from a large new Moonbase facility. Space: 1999 owes much of its visual design to pre-production work for the never-made second series of UFO.

Toward the end of its run, UFO experienced a drop in ratings in both the US and the UK; ITC executives in both countries began to question the financial viability of the new series, and support for the project collapsed. In the meantime, production designer Keith Wilson and the art department had made considerable progress in envisioning the look and design of the new series. Their work was shelved for the foreseeable future.

Anderson approached Grade's number two in New York, Abe Mandell, with the proposal for taking the research and development done for UFO: 1999 and creating a new science fiction series. Mandell was amenable, but stated he did not want a series set featuring people "having tea in the Midlands" and forbade any Earth-bound settings. Anderson responded that in the series opener, he would "blow up the Earth". Mandell countered that this concept might be off-putting to viewers, to which Anderson replied he would "blow up the Moon". The Andersons reworked UFO: 1999 so that the separation of Moon and Earth is caused by a nuclear accident rather than alien involvement.

Group Three Productions, a partnership of the Andersons and production executive Reg Hill, was to produce the series; ITC Entertainment and Italian broadcaster RAI were to provide the funding. Grade, aiming for a US network sale, insisted the series have American leads and employ American writers and directors. George Bellak, a well-known American television writer, was brought on staff. As stated by series writers Christopher Penfold and Johnny Byrne, it was Bellak who created and polished the series' defining concepts. Bellak wrote a ninety-minute opening episode titled "The Void Ahead", which was a close forerunner of "Breakaway". Bellak also set up a writers' guide defining the three leads, the facilities of the Moonbase and potential storylines.

For the lead characters of John Koenig and Helena Russell, Gerry Anderson approached the husband-and-wife acting team of Martin Landau and Barbara Bain. Landau and Bain were high-profile stars in the US after three years in the popular CBS espionage series Mission: Impossible. Producer Sylvia Anderson would have preferred British lead actors; since Grade insisted on Americans, she would have chosen Robert Culp (star of the 1960s espionage series I Spy) and Katharine Ross (co-star of 1960s blockbuster movies The Graduate and Butch Cassidy and the Sundance Kid). Lee H. Katzin, a highly respected American television director with a speciality for pilot episodes, was selected to direct the opening segment and brought into the fold as a primary director for the remainder of the series.

Speaking about the show in 2010, Bain reflected: "We had some very good science fiction people as advisors who knew what they were talking about. For instance, they knew that sound up there wouldn't travel, and it would just be quiet up there. But then we wouldn't have a series, so we couldn't do that. There were various considerations that had to be made, but they were based on what is, or what was, known at the time."

=== Special effects, design and music ===
The show's vehicles, including the Eagle space shuttle and the Moon Buggy, were represented with a mixture of full-sized props, photographic blow-ups, and detailed scale models. Dozens of models for the various alien spaceships and the Mark IX Hawk from the "War Games" episode were built by model maker Martin Bower.

The programme's special effects director Brian Johnson had previously worked on both Thunderbirds (as Brian Johncock) and 2001: A Space Odyssey (1968). Rather than relying on the expensive and time-consuming blue screen process, as for Star Trek, Johnson's team often employed a technique that went back to the earliest days of visual effects: spacecraft and planets would be filmed against black backgrounds, with the camera being rewound for each successive element. As long as the various elements did not overlap, this produced convincing results. In technical terms, the advantage was that all of the elements were recorded on the original negative, as opposed to blue screen, which would have involved several generations of duplication. Another benefit was that the camera's exposed negative contained completed effects thereby avoiding the costs of the blue screen "optical" technique. The disadvantage was that the number of possible angles was more limited. For instance, a spaceship could be seen approaching a planet from the side, but could not move in front of it without the elements overlapping.

Space: 1999 used Pinewood Studios sound-stages L and M. Each studio measures 90 by 105 feet (27 m × 32 m), with a floor-to-grid measurement of 30 feet (9.1 m). For the first series, Stage L housed the "standing sets"; such as Main Mission, the Eagle interior, the travel tube, and a small section of corridor. Due to the limited studio space, other sets depicting Alpha interiors, such as Medical Centre, were assembled as needed. Stage M was the "swing stage" – used for planet exteriors, spaceship interiors, and whatever else was needed for a given episode.

The unisex "Moon City" uniforms for the first series were created by Austrian fashion designer Rudi Gernreich, a personal friend of series star Barbara Bain. Other costumes were designed by production designer Keith Wilson, who was also responsible for set design. Wilson's innovative Moonbase set construction, using 4-by-8-foot (120 by 240 cm) plastic foam-board panels, linked together Lego-like into whatever room configuration was required, made for a uniform and realistic appearance for the Alpha interiors, which was relatively cheap and could be quickly assembled.

For the second series, the Moonbase uniforms were updated and coloured decorative stitching and turtleneck collars were added, as were various badges and patches. Red, navy, or dark-green jackets also appeared, originally on just the senior staff, then on many of the male extras. The female characters tended to wear skirts and knee-high boots throughout the second series rather than the flared trousers used in Year One. The costumes for Year Two were designed by Emma Porteous, who later designed the wardrobes for several James Bond films.

The Moonbase interiors were also upgraded for the second year, with the existing stock of wall panels, doors, and computer panels (along with some bits from other Anderson productions) being assembled for the first time—on Stage L—into a standing complex of interconnected sets (the first series' sets had been assembled as needed and the size of the Main Mission/Command Office complex was prohibitive for the construction of a lasting series of rooms). Vibrant colour, gadgets and equipment with a futuristic appearance typical of contemporary science fiction were more evident. For example, Helena no longer used a stethoscope, but a little beeping, all-purpose medical scanner similar to Dr McCoy's whistling medical "tricorder" on Star Trek.

The opening credits for the first series featured a dramatic fanfare composed by long-time Anderson associate Barry Gray, whose scores for the series were his final compositions for an Anderson production. Gray scored five episodes—"Breakaway", "Matter of Life and Death", "Black Sun", "Another Time, Another Place", and "The Full Circle"—Vic Elmes provided a completely electronic score for "Ring Around the Moon", and Big Jim Sullivan performed a one-off sitar composition for "The Troubled Spirit". Library music, classical compositions, and score excerpts from earlier Anderson productions augmented the five Gray scores.

The second series was scored by jazz musician and composer Derek Wadsworth; American producer Fred Freiberger wanted a more "driving, searing" score for his new action-adventure format. Aside from the new theme music, which was more synthesised than the theme for Year One, Wadsworth composed original music for the episodes "The Metamorph", "The Exiles", "One Moment of Humanity", "The Taybor", and "Space Warp". Much of this music was reused in other episodes.

=== Making of Series 1 ===
Two series of the programme were produced, each composed of 24 episodes. Production of the first series was from November 1973 to February 1975.

As the November 1973 start date approached, George Bellak fell out with Gerry Anderson over creative issues and left the production. Story consultant Christopher Penfold acted as head writer, bringing in American writer Edward di Lorenzo and Irish poet Johnny Byrne as script editors. Penfold reworked Bellak's opening episode into a one-hour draft first re-titled "Turning Point", then finalised as "Breakaway".

One week before live action filming commenced, Brian Johnson and his team began work on the visual effects sequences for the first episode at Bray Studios near Maidenhead, Berkshire on 5 November 1973. For the first six weeks, no usable footage resulted until the team discovered a dragging brake had affected film speed. Studio rehearsals commenced at Elstree Studios near Borehamwood, Hertfordshire on 12 November 1973. During filming of the first episode, it became apparent that the troubled Elstree was under the threat of imminent closure. One weekend, the company secretly relocated the production to Pinewood Studios at Iver Heath, Buckinghamshire, resulting in a union blacklisting of the production.

Scheduled to be completed in 10 days, filming on "Breakaway" overran by more than two weeks. Lee Katzin was a perfectionist and demanded take after take of scenes; even coverage of reaction shots of the background extras required running a whole scene from beginning to end. His two-hour director's cut was assembled and sent to ITC New York for a viewing. Abe Mandell was horrified by the finished product. Anderson re-wrote several key scenes and, after three days of re-shoots, re-edited the pilot into a one-hour episode that appeased the fears of ITC. Katzin was not asked back to the programme after the filming of his second episode "Black Sun", which also ran over schedule.

Scheduled for a twelve-month shoot, the twenty-four episodes took fifteen months to complete, with the production experiencing a number of difficulties. Britain's mandatory three-day work week in the early months of 1974 and the unplugging of the National Grid during the coal shortages due to industrial unrest of the early 1970s did not delay filming, for Pinewood had its own generators, but it affected film processing because the lab was an off-site contractor.

Group Three's commitment to its financial partner, RAI, to include Italian actors in the cast also had to be addressed. Originally, two supporting roles were intended for Italian actors; with the casting of Nick Tate and Zienia Merton in those roles, a solution had to be worked out. Four of the later episodes produced ("The Troubled Spirit", "Space Brain", "Dragon's Domain" and "The Testament of Arkadia") featured Italian guest artists.

The necessity to telex story outlines and scripts to New York for approval caused further production delays. The incessant re-writing this brought about eventually caused Penfold to resign during the shooting of "Space Brain", after completing his writing commitment with the script "Dragon's Domain". In a later interview, Johnny Byrne stated that "one episode they (New York) would ask us to speed things up, forcing us to cut out character development; then the next episode, they asked for more character moments, which would slow down the action; then they would complain there weren't enough pretty girls in another." Years later, Byrne and Penfold would agree that the process they worked under made "good scripts less than they had been" and forced them to waste time re-writing "bad scripts to make them acceptable". Byrne remained until the end of production; his last tasks were writing filler scenes for the desperately short "The Last Enemy" and a re-shoot for the troublesome "Space Brain". The scenes re-mounted for "The Last Enemy" concluded principal photography on 28 February 1975.

Due to the production delays, CBS cancelled its order for Space: 1999 and ordered Planet of the Apes for the 1974–1975 season instead, and neither of the other two US television networks were interested in purchasing a show that they had had no input into. Countries where the show was sold include France, Italy, Yugoslavia, Poland, Hungary, Ethiopia, Nigeria, South Africa, Turkey, Iran, Greece, the Netherlands, Belgium, Portugal, Peru, Japan, Malaysia, Canada, Mexico, Philippines, Singapore, South Korea and Taiwan. The world premiere of the series took place in Australia on the Seven Network in July 1975, with the network showing episodes into January 1976 before then putting it on hiatus for a year.

Despite the success with selling the show on an international basis, Grade and Mandell considered the US market important and started a drive to sell Space: 1999 to local stations for the 1975–1976 season, ultimately enticing over 150 US stations to run the programme.

=== Making of Series 2 ===
Following the completion of the first series, the production team prepared for a second series to commence production in the autumn of 1975. Gerry Anderson had staff writer Johnny Byrne prepare a critical analysis of the first twenty-four episodes, assessing their strengths and weaknesses to mount a new and improved second year. Byrne then commenced writing scripts in an improved first-series format: "The Biological Soul", "The Face of Eden", and "Children of the Gods". He engaged British writer Donald James to develop his first-series format story "The Exiles". Director Ray Austin was again contracted as one of the main directors and stayed with the show until leaving to direct in America.

All material was supposed to be vetted by ITC's New York office, but this had not worked out, with Penfold and Byrne writing most of the first series episodes. At this time, Sylvia Anderson left her role as producer when she and Gerry Anderson formally separated (and subsequently divorced). Fred Freiberger, whom Gerry Anderson was considering for the writing position due to the increasing pressure to hire an American head writer, was then brought on board to help guide the series as a producer and acted as show-runner. Freiberger had produced the third and final season of Star Trek in 1968–1969 and eight episodes of the first season of The Wild Wild West (including one in which Martin Landau guest-starred) before being dismissed. Though Anderson and Grade were satisfied with this choice, Abe Mandell had concerns about why he was unemployed and available at the time. 6 Lew Grade abruptly cancelled the series' production in late 1975 when ratings in the United States had dropped during the later autumn months of the year. Grade had already been disappointed by the lack of an American network broadcast sale. Gerry Anderson and Fred Freiberger rallied and pitched the idea of a new series with the addition of an alien character to Moonbase Alpha, who would shake up the dynamic of interaction on the Moonbase and regain viewer interest in the United States. On the strength of this proposal, Mandell approved the production of a second series.

In addition to the alien character Maya, to be played by Catherine Schell, who had previously guest-starred in the episode "Guardian of Piri", numerous other changes were made for what was branded Year Two. The character of Professor Bergman was dropped due to a dispute over Barry Morse's salary, but Morse later claimed that he was glad to leave, and he had told Anderson: "I would rather play with grown-ups for a while." With Bergman gone, the role of the scientist on Alpha was filled by Maya, whose people's science was far in advance of mankind's. Her character was conceived to provide "outside observation of human behaviour" as had been provided by the character of Mr. Spock on Star Trek. Maya shared Spock's logical approach to problem-solving and advanced intelligence, but differed in that she was a charming, fully emotional person. Koenig and Russell went from a barely noticeable courtship to a physically passionate, full-fledged romance, in which the devotion ran so deep that they offered to die for each other ("Brian the Brain").

To keep the budget and filming schedule under control, Freiberger did not want to rehire any of the first series cast members apart from Landau, Bain, and - initially - Morse, other than on an episode-by-episode basis, with no series contract. Supporting characters Paul Morrow (Prentis Hancock), David Kano (Clifton Jones) and Tanya Alexander (Suzanne Roquette) were thus removed from the cast. Faced with an uncertain future due to a lack of a contract, Anton Phillips (Dr. Bob Mathias) left after two Year Two episodes. His character was replaced by several recurring physicians. For similar reasons, Zienia Merton (Sandra Benes) left after three episodes, though she temporarily returned mid-series at the request of Barbara Bain. Freiberger had wanted to replace Alan Carter with a new pilot named Mark Macinlock, but a look at the fanmail made him realise Carter was one of the show's most popular characters. The actor who played Carter, Nick Tate, was nonetheless uncomfortable enough with not having a contract and the other changes Freiberger was making to opt out of appearing in Year Two, but Gerry Anderson stepped in and persuaded Tate to return.

Security Chief Tony Verdeschi also joined as a new character, played by Tony Anholt. His character served primarily as a secondary male action hero, and a romantic interest for Maya.

No on-screen explanations were offered for the cast changes. A scene in "The Metamorph" mentioning Bergman's death was scripted and filmed, but cut from the final edit. The Moonbase Alpha Technical Manual produced by Starlog magazine picks up this explanation, stating Bergman died due to a faulty spacesuit per the scripted scene. Likewise, it is mentioned in this publication that Morrow and Kano died in an Eagle crash between series and that Dr. Mathias was on sabbatical doing research. Fred Freiberger felt that these characters were one-dimensional and had no fan support; he told Nick Tate that the audience would not remember them and that, as far as he was concerned, they were just "somewhere else" on Alpha, lost in the crowd of three hundred other people.

Other changes included the main titles. Year One's opening montage of events from "Breakaway" and the episode about to unfold was dropped in favour of a special-effects sequence depicting the Moon being blown out of orbit into space. Schell, Landau and Bain were depicted in action-oriented images as opposed to the mannequin-like stances Landau and Bain assumed in the Year One main titles.

The expansive "Main Mission" set, with its balcony and windows revealing the lunar surface, was replaced by a more compact "Command Center" (they used the American spelling on the set), supposedly deep underground (this change was explained in the Year Two Writers' Bible and Technical Manual as necessary for security, but never explained onscreen). Medical Centre, Generator Section, Life Support and the Alphans' living quarters became smaller, while the interior of the Eagle command module was updated with additional buttons, flashing lights and television monitors, while the Eagle also lost a section of corridor (the galley/storage area) between the passenger module and the cockpit. (This was to accommodate its placement on Pinewood Soundstage "L", with the other standing Alpha sets; the Eagle was permanently affixed to the boarding tube/travel tube set and jammed between the travel-tube reception area and the Medical Centre.)

Production designer Keith Wilson stated in an interview in Destination: Moonbase Alpha that he was always being ordered by Freiberger to make sets smaller, taking away the expansive (and expensive) look of the first series' interiors. Freiberger was very budget-conscious and, press releases to the contrary, the production team was working with less money this series.

Freiberger emphasised action-adventure in Year Two stories to the exclusion of metaphysical themes explored in Year One. Of Year One, he commented, "They were doing the show as an English show, where there was no story, with the people standing around and talking. In the first show I did, I stressed action as well as character development, along with strong story content, to prove that 1999 could stand up to the American concept of what an action-adventure show should be."

Members of the Space: 1999 cast were disenchanted with the scripts. Martin Landau said: "They changed it because a bunch of American minds got into the act and they decided to do many things they felt were commercial. Fred Freiberger helped in some respects, but, overall, I don't think he helped the show, I think he brought a much more ordinary, mundane approach to the series." Byrne, who was contracted to write three episodes for series two, said of Freiberger, "I got along very well with him. But it was clear that we were in different universes as far as stories were concerned."

With the last-minute renewal from Grade, the production team hit the ground running for Series Two. Production began on 26 January 1976 and was scheduled to last a mere ten months for all episodes.

To fulfil the scheduling requirement and cut production costs, Freiberger used the "double-up script" solution. During "double-up" instalments, two first-unit production teams would film two episodes simultaneously. Landau and some of the supporting cast would be given expanded roles and would film an episode on location or on sets constructed for that story in Pinewood's Soundstage "M", while Bain and the remaining supporting cast (also in expanded roles) would film their episode in the standing Alpha sets on Soundstage "L". Landau and Bain would then be given minor roles in the opposing episodes. This measure was used to complete eight stories as four pairs: "The Rules of Luton" and "The Mark of Archanon"; "The AB Chrysalis" and "Catacombs of the Moon"; "A Matter of Balance" and "Space Warp"; "Devil's Planet" and "Dorzak".

Relations between Freiberger and the Year One veterans were strained. Landau complained about stories he felt were lightweight or absurd when compared to the previous year's efforts. He wrote on the cover of one script: "I'm not going out on a limb for this show because I'm not in accord with what you're [Freiberger] doing as a result ... etc. I don't think I even want to do the promos—I don't want to push the show any more as I have in the past. It's not my idea of what the show should be. It's embarrassing to me if I am not the star of it and in the way I feel it should be. This year should be more important to it, not less important to it ... I might as well work less hard in all of them." Johnny Byrne said that Freiberger was a good man and good producer, but not good for Space: 1999. He had gotten them a second year after the cancellation, but the changes he made did not benefit the show.

Principal photography came to an end on 23 December 1976 with "The Dorcons". An article regarding a third series was printed in the trade papers: "Now entrenched in its successful second season boom, ITC is looking forward to a third season with more fantastic events and additions, although mum's the word at the studio. They will only say that Maya and Miss Schell will be kept in and that the budget may be raised again, but that's all until final preparations and an official announcement are made."

=== Cancelled series 3 ===
The producers and studio intended to continue the show with a third series. This was to be shorter than the previous two, with 13 episodes, for budget reasons. Maya was considered to be a successful character, and the producers began grooming her for a spinoff show. The "Maya" series was also intended to run for 13 episodes a year.

== Broadcast history ==
=== United Kingdom ===
The series premiered in September 1975, on the ITV network but was not broadcast nationally at the same time (this remained the case until a repeat airing on BBC Two in 1998). Most ITV regions (including Yorkshire, Grampian, Ulster, Scottish, Border, ATV, and Tyne Tees) premiered the series on Thursday, 4 September 1975 in a 7.00 pm slot. London Weekend Television (LWT) and Anglia screened the first episode two days later on Saturday, 6 September at 5.50 pm. The Granada region began showing the series on Friday, 26 September 1975, initially at 7.35 pm before moving to 6.35 pm a few weeks later. The HTV region did not begin showing the series until October 1975, again in an early Friday evening slot. However, within a few weeks, various stations had moved the series elsewhere in their schedules.

The second series premiered on LWT in a non-prime-time slot on Saturday, 4 September 1976 at 11.30 am, with ATV following on just a few hours later at 5.40 pm. Westward and Ulster started to screen the series in early 1977, while Grampian and Tyne Tees did not screen the series until later in the year. After showing some reruns from the first series on Sunday afternoons in early 1977, Granada began showing the second series on Friday, 15 April 1977 at 7.30 pm, but by June the series was moved back to Sunday afternoons. Scottish started to screen the series on 9 April 1978 on Sunday afternoons. HTV did not pick the second series up until 1984 and then only showed nineteen out of the twenty-four episodes (the last episodes were not screened in Wales until the series was repeated in the 1990s). Southern Television was the other ITV region known not to have broadcast series two. Even its successor broadcaster, Television South, failed to screen any series two episodes when Space: 1999 was reshown in other ITV regions between 1982 and 1985.

In 1998, the entire series was reshown on BBC Two, which was the first time the show had been simulcast nationally in the UK. The series concluded, aptly, in 1999.

After several reruns in the 2000s on ITV4, followed by runs on the Legend channel and the now defunct ForcesTV channel, as well as being added to the BritBox streaming service, the series became available for free in the UK on ITVX from January 2023.

=== United States ===
In the United States, efforts to sell the series to one of the three networks for the 1974–75 or 1975–76 television seasons failed. The networks were uninterested in a project over which they had no creative control, being presented with twenty-four completed episodes. Abe Mandell of ITC had secured a handshake agreement with a network executive in 1974, but after the man's termination, all his projects were abandoned. Undaunted, Mandell created what he called his own "Space: 1999 Network" and sold the completed program into first-run syndication directly to local stations. Much of the publicity mentioned the then-staggering three million pound budget: as a part of the American promotion effort, a glossy magazine-sized brochure was produced, touting Space: 1999 as the Six-and-a-Half Million Dollar Series (an allusion to the then-popular American programme The Six Million Dollar Man) featuring American stars, American writers and American directors.

In the months leading to the beginning of the autumn 1975 series, Landau and Bain participated in special preview screenings in select cities. Landau is said to have personally contacted editors of TV Guide magazine in some markets to secure coverage of Space: 1999 in its pages upon learning of ITC's somewhat poor promotional efforts.

By September 1975, the series had been bought by 155 US stations. While most of these were independent (such as WPIX in New York City, KHJ-TV in Los Angeles, WGN-TV in Chicago and WDRB-TV in Louisville), a handful were affiliated with the major networks (such as then-NBC affiliate WSOC-TV in Charlotte and then-CBS affiliate KFSN-TV in Fresno, California) and sometimes pre-empted regular network programming to show episodes of the series. Most US stations broadcast episodes in the weekday evening hour just before prime time or on weekends. ABC affiliate WCVB-TV in Boston, as well as NBC affiliate KPRC-TV in Houston both aired the first series in prime time, bumping the network shows to other time slots.

In August 2018, Comet announced it would be airing both series beginning in September.

=== Canada ===
In Canada, CBC Television was the broadcaster of Space: 1999 from 1975 into the 1980s. The first series in 1975–76 was shown regionally on some CBC-owned-and-operated stations, the airtime varying. With the start of the second series in September 1976, CBC Television upgraded Space: 1999 to full-network status, airing it Saturdays on all CBC-owned-and-operated stations, with affiliated, privately owned stations also offering the show on Saturdays. Most of the country saw Space: 1999 at 5 p.m. on Saturdays, a notable exception being the Atlantic Provinces in which it was broadcast at 6 or 6:30 p.m. or – as was the case in the summers – sometime earlier in the afternoon to accommodate live sports coverage, the airing of which crossed into or totally over the usual Space: 1999 airtime. After the 1976–77 broadcast year (in which second-series episodes were run and rerun), the show's ratings were sufficiently high for CBC Television to give the first series a full-network airing – and with further repeats – from 1977 to 1978. The French-language CBC Television, Radio-Canada, showed Cosmos: 1999 several times (both series) between 1975 and 1980, first on Mondays (1975–1976), then on Saturdays (1976–1977), then on Mondays (1979), and finally on Wednesdays (1979–1980).

The series fared admirably on CBC in Canada, airing in English in a family viewing period, late Saturday afternoons before hockey broadcasts, with a mostly undisrupted run and rerun of all 24 episodes from September 1976 through September 1977. The French version was also broadcast, in early evening on Saturdays. Ratings were sufficient for a full additional year's transmission of Year One in the English CBC Saturday programming slot in 1977 and 1978. Episodes of both Year One and Year Two were repeated regionally in Canada in English and French through the early-to-mid-1980s. YTV Canada broadcast both series with reportedly good ratings from 1990 to 1992, in a late Saturday afternoon airtime closely matching that of the CBC English network in the 1970s.

The full-network English CBC airing began with the series opener, "Breakaway", on 11 September 1976, then "The Metamorph", the Year Two opener, on 18 September. "The Exiles", "Journey to Where", "The Taybor", and "New Adam, New Eve" followed respectively in the subsequent weeks. Next were "The Mark of Archanon", "Brian the Brain", "The Rules of Luton", "The AB Chrysalis", "Catacombs of the Moon", and "Seed of Destruction". "Seed of Destruction" aired on 27 November, and then with December there came a month of repeats. And after a pre-emption for New Year's Day sports, new episodes resumed airing on 8 January 1977 with "A Matter of Balance", followed by "The Beta Cloud", "One Moment of Humanity", "The Lambda Factor", "All That Glisters", and "The Seance Spectre". The two-part episode, "The Bringers of Wonder", was shown on 19 and 26 February. And then "Dorzak", "The Immunity Syndrome", "Devil's Planet", and "The Dorcons" followed in March. "Space Warp" would not be shown until 21 May, after many weeks of repeats. By 10 September 1977, except for "The Exiles", all of the second-series episodes had been repeated. And thereafter, a 1977–1978 run of first-series episodes began with "War Games" on 17 September.

=== Other markets ===
It was shown in Italy as Spazio 1999; Argentina, Uruguay, Puerto Rico, Dominican Republic, Guatemala, francophone Canada, and France as Cosmos: 1999; Denmark as Månebase Alpha; Brazil and Portugal as Espaço: 1999; Germany as Mondbasis Alpha 1; Sweden as Månbas Alpha; Poland as Kosmos 1999 (1977–1979); Finland as Avaruusasema Alfa; Greece as Διάστημα 1999; Hungary as Alfa Holdbázis; Spain, Chile, Venezuela, and Colombia as Espacio: 1999; Mexico as Odisea 1999; Iran as 1999:فضا; Turkey as Uzay 1999, and South Africa as Alpha 1999 (1976, dubbed into Afrikaans). The series was also broadcast in the Netherlands, Belgium, New Zealand and Australia.

On 30 October 2022, RAI and ITV Studios (successor of the former ITC) jointly released a restored version of the series on RaiPlay in Italy. The first episode was presented to the public at Lucca Comics & Games the previous day.

In Finland the first series was originally aired by the commercial MTV (Mainostelevisio) channel in 1976 (at the time, it timeshared with the two YLE channels, the series first aired on Yle TV1 but moved to Yle TV2 after a few episodes), but it was withdrawn after twelve episodes, on demand of the national programme board, as the show was considered too brutal and horrifying. The same thing happened when MTV tried to air the second series in 1978 (this time, only eight episodes). The complete show was not seen in Finland until 1996–1997 when a small local channel, TV-Tampere, aired it. Since then it aired on TVTV! in 2000 and 2001, and later on MTV3 Scifi in 2008.

== Reception ==
Response to the series varied: some critics praised it as a classic, citing the production values and multi-layered storytelling ("Space: 1999 is like Star Trek shot full of methedrine. It is the most flashy, gorgeous sci-fi trip ever to appear on TV..." and "Space: 1999 is a visually stunning, space-age morality play..."); others panned it for poor plotting and wooden acting, especially on the part of Barbara Bain ("the plots and characterisation on Space: 1999 have been primitive..." and "A disappointing collage of wooden characters, boring dialogue and incomprehensible plots..."). An impressed Stephen Earll wrote in the San Antonio Express, "If the first episode of the new Space: 1999 series is an overall indication of quality, devoted Star Trek followers will probably make an enthusiastic switch."

Isaac Asimov criticised the scientific accuracy of the series by pointing out that any explosion capable of knocking the Moon out of its orbit would actually blow it apart, and even if it did leave orbit it would take hundreds of thousands of years to reach the nearest star. He also noted that describing Moonbase Alpha as being on the "dark side" of the moon was an error as no part of the Moon is permanently dark. He praised the programme for the accuracy of the representation of movement in the low gravity environment of the Moon, and for its realistic production design. Asimov's responses were based on the pilot episode only. Subsequent episodes (such as "Black Sun", third in production order, and "Another Time, Another Place", sixth in production order) suggest the Moon reaches the stars by passing through wormholes and hyperspatial tunnels, a plot point made more overt in the second series' episodes, notably "The Taybor" and "Space Warp".

In the 28 February 1976 edition of TV Guide, critic Cleveland Amory panned the series. In his review he noted, "[T]here was practically no dialogue for quite a while, which, in view of what was to come, was a terrific idea. Then came lines like... 'We're sitting on the biggest bomb ever made.' In a show like this, that's one line they should have avoided at any price." He criticised the acting, saying, "The special effects are good, but the actors are awful, even Martin Landau and Barbara Bain, whom you will remember from Mission: Impossible; and Barry Morse, of The Fugitive. Miss Bain's part is the zombiest, which is some distinction, as the cast is huge."

In an extensive article on Space: 1999, Michael Jahn recounted a conversation with Star Trek's story editor D. C. Fontana: "According to [Fontana], 1999 suffers from the same problem its makers had with UFO. The technical effects are excellent, but they don't create people you care about."

Gerry and Sylvia Anderson were surprised and disappointed that the public never granted them the suspension of disbelief given to other science-fiction programmes.

On the ways the second series differed from the first, Thomas Vinciguerra commented: "The music went from eerie to jazzy. If no longer ponderous, the episodes became clichéd or silly."

Reviewing the show as a whole, science fiction historian John Clute described Space: 1999 as "visually splendid" but criticised what he regarded as the show's "mediocre acting" and "rotten scripts".

== Home video releases ==
Space: 1999's first home video releases were in the 1980s, when a number of compilation films were issued on VHS in the UK and US markets. The following decade, these were followed by VHS releases of the whole series in its original format.

=== United Kingdom ===
The full series was released on home video in the 1990s, with each cassette (or "volume") featuring two episodes. In 2001, it was released on DVD in the UK by Carlton Media, both in single disc volumes (each volume contained four episodes) and also as two complete series boxed sets (titled as "Year One" and "Year Two") comprising six discs each. Each DVD also contained various extra features, including a variety of archive production material, memorabilia, and interviews with the cast and crew from the time the series was being made.

In 2005, Network re-issued Year One in the UK as a Special Edition seven-DVD boxed set. For this release, to coincide with the series' 30th Anniversary, each episode was digitally restored by creating new 35 mm film elements (a new interpositive made from the original negative which is then used to make further copies). High Definition digital transfers were then made from the interpositives using a state-of-the-art Philips Spirit DataCine. This vastly improved the picture quality in comparison to the previous DVD releases. However, the restoration process has actually made some of the space scenes (that involve special effects and model work) less realistic due to increased brightness and contrast. This boxed set also included two booklets and a new set of extra features that were not on the Carlton DVD releases, including featurettes on "Concept & Creation" and "Special Effects & Design" (edited from an earlier Fanderson documentary made in 1996), textless and alternative opening and closing title sequences, a two-part Clapperboard special on Gerry Anderson from 1975, and also a brand new 70-minute documentary entitled "These Episodes" in which Anderson, Christopher Penfold, Johnny Byrne, Zienia Merton and David Lane reflect on the making of key episodes from the first series.

Network released Year One on Blu-ray in the UK on 1 November 2010, in full high definition (1080p), and simultaneously re-released their Special Edition DVD boxed set of Year One with new cover artwork at the same time. The Blu-ray set includes all of the extras on the 2005 Network DVD release as well as some of the extras that were on the 2001 Carlton DVD release (including a Lyons Maid ice-lolly commercial, and an SFX segment from the British documentary series Horizon). It also includes several new extras including a "Memories of Space" featurette, a Sylvia Anderson interview (in which she frankly discusses the series and her thoughts about Landau and Bain), an expanded version of the "These Episodes" documentary from the DVD set, several PDF files containing scripts and annuals, an extensive set of photo galleries with hundreds of stills, and the first episode of Year Two, "The Metamorph", in digitally restored hi-definition.

Network DVD began a similar restoration process for Year Two in 2007. However, progress was slow due to higher production costs in comparison to remastering Year One. (The audio for Year One had already been digitised prior to Network's restoration, but Year Two's had not). In late 2014, Network finally announced that Year Two would be released in 2015. As part of this announcement, Network released a limited edition (of 1999 copies) of a special preview disc of the two-part story "The Bringers of Wonder" on 8 December 2014. This release also contains a restored version of the feature length Destination: Moonbase Alpha film. The remastered Year Two was eventually released on Blu-ray and DVD in September 2015, to coincide with the series' 40th Anniversary. Again containing a wealth of extra features, the sets include galleries, vintage interviews, a blooper, behind the scenes footage, original source audio recordings, scripts and annuals PDF files, a stock footage archive, a textless opening title sequence, trailers and promos, "music only" options for all episodes, a stop-motion fan film from 1979, and a specially re-edited/rescored version of the episode "Seed of Destruction" as if it were made for Year One.

=== United States ===
In the mid-1990s, the series was partially available on VHS tapes through the Columbia House subscription service. A total of 10 tapes were released, with 2 episodes per tape, one each from Series 1 and Series 2.

A&E Home Video (under licence from Carlton International Media Limited) has released the entire series on DVD in Region 1. It was initially released in 8 sets with 6 episodes each in 2001 and 2002. On 24 September 2002, a 16-disc "Mega Set" boxed set featuring all 48 complete, uncut, original broadcast episodes of the series was released. On 31 July 2007, A&E released Space: 1999 – Complete Series, 30th Anniversary Edition. This is essentially the same as the 2002 "mega set" release (and does not use the 2005 hi-def remasters), but does includes a special bonus disc full of extra features. Year One was released on Blu-ray in the US on 2 November 2010 by A&E Home Entertainment, with new High-Definition restored transfers and a newly remastered 5.1 DTS-HD MA surround sound re-mix. In July 2019, Shout Factory released both series of Space: 1999 on Blu-ray using restored and remastered HD transfers and remastered 5.1 DTS-HD MA surround sound re-mix.

== Revival attempts ==
In the late 1990s, Johnny Byrne and Christopher Penfold attempted to revive the franchise as a film series, similar to the way Star Trek had been revived cinematically in the late 1970s. The first film would have picked up the story several years after the series ended, and would have featured a heavily redesigned Moonbase Alpha. Ultimately, the project failed.

In February 2012, a new series, provisionally titled Space: 2099, was announced as a reboot of the original. It was planned to be made by ITV Studios America in conjunction with HD Films. On 15 August 2018, Brian Johnson, special effects director for the original series, announced that the reboot was on track for production in the UK, pending "confirmation of the deal". The series remains unmade.

== Other media ==
The series has been adapted into other media, including episode novelisations and original novels, audio plays, comic books, compilation films and toys and games.

In the 1970s and 1980s, a number of episode compilations, some re-edited with original material, were produced for TV syndication and foreign theatrical release.

The year 1999 saw the release of a fan-made short film, Message from Moonbase Alpha. Written by series script editor Johnny Byrne and featuring Zienia Merton reprising the role of Sandra Benes, this production is set many years after the TV episodes and serves as an epilogue to the series.

From 2019 to 2023, Big Finish Productions released a series of Space: 1999 audio dramas.
