= Space Brain =

- Space: 1999 episode
- Episode no.: Series 1 Episode 9
- Directed by: Charles Crichton
- Written by: Christopher Penfold
- Cinematography by: Frank Watts
- Editing by: Derek Hyde Chambers
- Production code: SP 20
- Original air date: 16 January 1976

Guest appearances
- Shane Rimmer as Kelly; Carla Romanelli as Melita; Derek Anders as Wayland; James Snell as Cousteau; Andy Sutcliffe as an Alphan

Episode chronology
← Previous "The Troubled Spirit"	Next → "War Games"

"Space Brain" is the ninth episode of the first series of Space: 1999, a 1970s British science fiction television series produced by Group Three for ITC Entertainment. Written by Christopher Penfold and directed by Charles Crichton, it was the 20th episode to be produced and was filmed at Pinewood Studios in December 1974 and February 1975.

Opening in 1999, the series follows the crew of lunar colony Moonbase Alpha after a nuclear explosion pushes the Moon out of Earth orbit and into interstellar space. Unable to control the rogue planet's trajectory, the Alphans encounter various astronomical phenomena and alien civilisations as they search for a way back to Earth or a new world to settle on. In "Space Brain", the Moon faces destruction by a vast spatial anomaly which is revealed to be a living organism: a "brain" holding the cosmos together.

The episode first aired on 16 January 1976 on Anglia Television. It received mixed reviews from commentators.

== Plot ==
A spatial anomaly jams all of Moonbase Alpha's communications with hieroglyph-like symbols. Eagle 1 is launched to investigate the swirling object, which the pilots liken to a giant anemone. On approach, the Eagle is covered in glutinous strings and contact is lost. As a rescue Eagle is launched, a small meteorite hits the Moon. It is coated in the same gel-like substance, which Dr Russell's analysis shows to be organic. Professor Bergman reports that the meteorite's components are those of an Eagle – with traces of human tissue. Commander Koenig realises they have recovered part of the crushed remains of Eagle 1.

Rescue Eagle co-pilot Kelly is conducting a spacewalk of Eagle 1's last known position when he is transfixed by the anomaly. The unconscious astronaut is retrieved by Captain Carter and returned to Alpha, where Russell discovers that his brain has gone into overdrive. Alpha's computer starts downloading data into Kelly, which his brain relays to the anomaly. Using the astronaut as a conduit, the anomaly responds by flashing more symbols on nearby video monitors. The Alphans deduce that the anomaly is a living organism. Kelly breaks out of Medical and attempts to reprogram Computer, but is thwarted when Koenig cuts the power. He collapses in the arms of his wife Melita, begging her to "make them understand".

The Moon is heading for the anomaly and the same fate as Eagle 1. With no way to alter course, the Alphans plan to weaken the anomaly by remotely flying nuclear ordnance into its core. As the bomber Eagle departs, Bergman discovers that the gel has turned into a super-dense foam. The information that Kelly transmitted was about the Moon, including its course changes since it broke away from Earth. Koenig believes that the anomaly is benevolent and, like the Alphans, wants to avoid a collision. He has himself neurally linked with Kelly and learns that they are dealing with a vast "space brain", perhaps the lynchpin of whole galaxies. The material that destroyed Eagle 1 is the brain's equivalent of antibodies, evolved to fight invading pathogens. Were a Moon-sized body to fall through the brain, the immune response would be on an entirely different scale.

Speaking through Kelly, the brain proposes detonating nuclear warheads around the Moon's equator to affect its rotation, and possibly its trajectory. Needing to recover the ordnance they sent up, the Alphans attempt to recall the Eagle, but the autopilot fails. Flying a second Eagle, Koenig docks with the bomber and defuses the payload, but the return journey ends disastrously when the bomber breaks free and crashes on the Moon.

The back-up plan is to increase Alpha's atmospheric pressure and seal off its sections to repel or contain the antibodies. Non-essential personnel are moved to subterranean shelters, while those who remaining above ground put on spacesuits. The Moon enters the brain and is submerged in torrents of foam. Alpha's Medical section is breached and Kelly is killed. Main Mission is flooding when the Moon passes out the other side, ending the bombardment. Speculating that their transit has probably killed the brain like a bullet through a head, Koenig and Russell lament their failure to establish meaningful communication and understanding.

== Regular cast ==
- Martin Landau as Commander John Koenig
- Barbara Bain as Dr Helena Russell
- Barry Morse as Professor Victor Bergman
- Prentis Hancock as Controller Paul Morrow
- Clifton Jones as David Kano
- Zienia Merton as Sandra Benes
- Anton Phillips as Dr Bob Mathias
- Nick Tate as Captain Alan Carter
- Suzanne Roquette as Tanya Alexander

== Production ==
Principal photography at Pinewood Studios took place between 5 and 19 December 1974. The alien antibodies were represented by shaving foam in the special effects sequences, and a mixture based on sodium dodecyl sulphate in scenes with live actors.

On the making of the foam-filled climax, Nick Tate remembered that the sets became treacherously slippery and the noise was deafening because of the aero engines that were being used to drive the foam. He recalled: "[T]his twelve-foot wall of foam, which was as scary as if it had been a real menace, came floating down the studio floor, about a hundred yards wide. We were all dressed up in our spacesuits and had to wade through it [...] [The director] went rushing out in front of the cameras waving his arms and screaming, 'Cut! Cut!' He hit the base of the foam, shot underneath it like in a Laurel and Hardy movie, and completely disappeared. When he finally struggled out, he looked like the Abominable Snowman." Tate reflected that the filming process was "very amusing, but at the same time very dangerous."

According to Barry Morse, the climax was filmed in two takes, shot many hours apart "because no one had thought how we were going to get all these soap suds out of the set." He added: "[B]y the time we came to take two, we realised that we could not stop for anything." As the second take began, the clapper loader fell into the foam, but delayed picking himself up so as not to ruin the shot. "[W]e went on playing this wretched scene whilst he was being smothered by the soap suds and foam, scarcely able to breathe."

By the end of filming, Gerry Anderson, the series' executive producer, was dissatisfied with Christopher Penfold's script. He decided to revise the plot to make it clearer that the "space brain" was a friendly entity, while adding in several new scenes. Filmed over three days in February 1975, Anderson's additional material was the last to be shot for Space: 1999 Series 1. The rewrite included a new cold open with an off-duty Commander Koenig finishing a jigsaw puzzle based on a painting of the Visitation of Mary. Because Carla Romanelli was no longer available, the role of Melita was re-cast.

A scene cut from the finished episode showed the mesmerised Kelly trying to hijack the Rescue Eagle, forcing Carter to stun him with a laser weapon. The climax is set to a 1957 rendition of "Mars, the Bringer of War", the first movement of The Planets by Gustav Holst. The episode also features incidental music originally composed for Joe 90 and The Secret Service.

== Reception ==
"Space Brain" received a mixed response from commentators. According to John Kenneth Muir, it is among the series' "most effective" episodes. Muir also considered the antibody bombardment to be one of the best climaxes to a Space: 1999 episode. He especially praised this sequence for both the fast pace and Landau's performance as Koenig, arguing that they compensate for the production design limitations of using ordinary foam to represent alien antibodies. In a later review, Muir conceded that the foam was the episode's "biggest stumbling block".

Muir also found meaning in the episode's use of Holst, as well as its teaser sequence including the Visitation jigsaw puzzle. He wrote that in one sense, the puzzle scene foretells the story: Koenig, Dr Russell and Professor Bergman "must each put together a piece of the space entity's puzzle: from the indecipherable hieroglyphs, to Kelly's odd physical condition, to the true (and horrific) nature of the meteor." He also stated that on a higher level, the painting reflects Kelly's role as intermediary between the Alphans and the space brain, noting that in both painting and episode "there is indeed a 'visitation', and a human being is transformed by what she or he carries within. The shot of the painting also reveals what Koenig only learns later: that the space brain, like Mary's God, is a benevolent one." Muir observed that while the episode begins on a peaceful note, it escalates to a war-like sequence set to Holst's martial music, these conflicting "bookends" symbolising juxtaposed themes of peace and war.

SFX magazine rated the episode "B-minus", noting that other science fiction series "did a 'foam machine' episode sooner or later" and Space: 1999's attempt was "more intelligent" than most. Despite finding its premise "silly", Video Watchdog wrote that the episode was improved by its music, editing and direction. SciFiNow magazine gave it 2 out of 5, calling it "fun, but only just" and "completely over the top". Commentators for DreamWatch Bulletin found the episode slowly paced and negatively compared the foam scenes to the portrayal of the seaweed creature in the Doctor Who serial Fury from the Deep. TV Zone was critical, describing the episode as "pure nonsense" and "obviously written because the production team had got hold of foam-generating equipment and thought a story could be written around it." According to reviewer Richard Houldsworth, it epitomises "the sci-fi hokum that the series got a (mostly undeserved) reputation for providing".
