= The Metamorph =

- Space: 1999 episode
- Episode no.: Series 2 Episode 1
- Directed by: Charles Crichton
- Written by: Johnny Byrne
- Editing by: Mike Campbell
- Production code: SPII 1
- Original air date: 4 September 1976

Guest appearances
- Brian Blessed as Mentor; Anouska Hempel as Annette Fraser; Gerard Paquis as Lew Picard; Peter Porteous as Petrov; Nick Brimble as Ray Torens; Robert Reeves as Peter; Sarah Bullen as Kate; George Lane Cooper as 1st Overseer; Alf Joint as 2nd Overseer; Reuben Martin as Maya/Gorilla; Roy Stewart as Alien Miner; Jenny Cresswell as Alphan Woman

Episode chronology
← Previous "Black Sun"	Next → "The Exiles"

"The Metamorph" is the first episode of the second series of Space: 1999 (and the twenty-fifth overall episode of the programme). The screenplay was written by Johnny Byrne; the director was Charles Crichton. Previous titles were "The Biological Soul" and "The Biological Computer". The final shooting script is dated 19 January 1976. Live-action filming took place from Monday 26 January 1976 through Monday 16 February 1976.

== Plot ==
Moonbase Alpha is recovering from an encounter with a space warp that hurled the Moon several light years across space. Titanium is needed for repairs, and an Eagle piloted by Bill Fraser and Ray Torens is searching a planetary system for sources of the metal. Monitoring the mission from Alpha's Command Center is Fraser's wife Annette.

One of the planets is covered in active volcanoes. A boulder transforms into a sphere of energy that drags the Eagle down to the planet's surface. Alpha is contacted by a humanoid alien who introduces himself as the Mentor of the planet Psychon. Mentor, who used his power of matter transmutation to capture the Eagle, agrees to return the pilots provided that another Eagle is sent to collect them. He also offers titanium.

Commander Koenig departs in Eagle 4 accompanied by Dr Russell, Captain Carter and scientist Lew Picard. Mentor reneges on the deal and generates another energy ball that downs the Eagle, which lands in a crater filled with derelict spacecraft. The Alphans enter a mine containing slave workers guarded by shapeshifting overseers. From the workers' behaviour, Russell deduces that they have suffered brain damage. One of them is a mindless Torens. The way is blocked by a force field. Picard attempts to fire his laser weapon through the barrier, but the beam rebounds and vaporises him. The others are captured by an energy ball.

Koenig is taken to Mentor's residence. He encounters Mentor's daughter Maya, a metamorph: trained in the Psychon art of molecular transformation, she is able to assume the form of any living organism. Mentor also introduces Psyche, a matter-manipulating organic computer powered by the mental energy of other beings, including the slaves lobotomised by Mentor's mind transfer device. Mentor plans to use Psyche to restore Psychon to its former glory, calculating that the 300 people on Alpha will provide sufficient brainpower.

After Mentor threatens to transfer the minds of Russell, Carter and Fraser to Psyche, Koenig agrees to surrender his people. He calls Alpha and announces that Psychon is to be colonised, adding that "Directive 4" is in effect. Later, he reveals Mentor's agenda to the innocent Maya, who is aghast. Transforming into a bird, she ventures into the mine; what she sees causes her to lose all faith in her father.

On Alpha, controller Tony Verdeschi reveals that "Directive 4" is a coded signal: destroy the place from which it was issued. Consoling Annette, he orders the launch of a drone Eagle armed with nuclear ordnance. Mentor's equipment uncovers the ruse, angering Mentor, who destroys the Eagle and starts to bombard Alpha.

On Koenig's assurance that he will not harm Mentor, Maya releases the Alphans. Koenig smashes Psyche's controls, triggering an energy discharge that sets fire to the complex and causes all of Psychon's volcanoes to start erupting. Crying that the planet will be destroyed, a wounded Mentor begs Maya to stop Koenig. She refuses, and Mentor is consumed by the flames.

The mine collapses, killing all the slaves including Torens. The other Alphans and Maya reach Eagle 4 and lift off just as the crater erupts. As the Frasers are reunited over the video monitor, Koenig and Russell invite Maya to make a new life for herself on Alpha.

== Regular cast ==
- Martin Landau as Commander John Koenig
- Barbara Bain as Dr Helena Russell
- Catherine Schell as Maya
- Tony Anholt as Controller Tony Verdeschi
- Nick Tate as Captain Alan Carter
- Zienia Merton as Sandra Benes
- John Hug as Bill Fraser
- Anton Phillips as Doctor Bob Mathias

== Production ==
In October 1975, in the midst of pre-production on its second series, Sir Lew Grade informed executive producer Gerry Anderson that Space: 1999 would be cancelled unless extensive changes in form and content were made. Anderson and new producer Fred Freiberger brainstormed, proposing a drastic retooling to broaden its appeal to the American audience (and hopefully win an American network sale). The show would become more action-oriented and present a dynamic new cast of younger regulars joining Martin Landau and Barbara Bain. At the forefront would be an alien girl whose power of 'molecular transformation' would give the show a science-fiction 'wow factor'. Based on the format change, Abe Mandell, Grade's number two in New York, 'green-lit' the second series.

As a result of the cancellation crisis, production resumed behind schedule. Johnny Byrne's script "The Biological Soul" (which Byrne had already written to be the second-series premiere episode) was quickly pressed into service. It told of the Alphans' encounter with the unbalanced Mentor of the planet Psycho and his biological computer, Psyche. In this version, the solitary Mentor and the sentient Psyche share an affection for one another. When Psyche becomes aware of her master's nefarious deeds and the suffering she has caused, she elects to destroy them both. Written in the first-series format, it was extensively revised to reflect the many changes made in the interim.

Freiberger had judged the first-series' supporting cast to be 'unlikeable'; considered expendable, he made no attempt to explain their absence. The new characters were originally named Simon Hays (second-in-command), Mark Macinlock (head of Reconnaissance) and Jameson (head of Weapons Section). Nick Tate was asked to return as Alan Carter only after Freiberger learned of the actor's popularity. The revised script contained a conversation between Verdeschi and Sandra wherein Victor Bergman's fate was mentioned. The professor's death was attributed to a spacesuit with a faulty helmet. Though filmed, this sequence was not included in the final cut.

Brian Blessed had appeared in the first-series episode "Death's Other Dominion" as Doctor Cabot Rowland. Before joining the programme as Maya, Catherine Schell had also guest-starred in the previous series, portraying an android temptress, the Servant of the Guardian, in "Guardian of Piri". Tony Anholt had starred as Paul Buchet in The Protectors, another Anderson production, before assuming the role of Tony Verdeschi.

The date of Helena's status report—342 days after leaving orbit—contradicts previous information. In "Dragon's Domain", the date was established as 877 days after leaving orbit. Many attribute this continuity breach to Freiberger as, purportedly, the producer had screened only eight first-series episodes after joining the production. The final shooting script listed the date as 108 days; this was changed in post production. It also stated the mineral the Alphans required was 'tiranium' (a fictional material), not titanium. The term tiranium would be used in the subsequent episode "Catacombs of the Moon", also as a rare and vital mineral essential to the life-support system.

=== Music ===
An original score was composed for this episode by Derek Wadsworth. Wadsworth, a jazz trombonist and composer, had been engaged to compose the score for the Gerry Anderson live-action television special The Day After Tomorrow. (Also known as Into Infinity, it was intended as a backdoor pilot episode for a new science-fiction series.) As Wadsworth's modern style, with its strong beat, would complement the new Space: 1999's action-adventure format, he was chosen as the composer for the second series.

== Reception ==
Dreamwatch magazine rated "The Metamorph" 8 out of 10, calling it "an enjoyable romp". Giving the episode an "A" grade, SFX commented that its focus on action was to the detriment of the writing, but described it as "good fun all the same". James O'Neill rated the episode three stars out of four, calling it "more action-packed and less cerebral than many [Space: 1999] Year One shows and much better than most that followed."

Daily Variety was dismissive of the episode, criticising its writing, "listless direction", "papier-mâché performances" and special effects, as well as its setting on Psychon, "a sterile world polluted with space platitudes and clichés". The review added: "The only redeeming feature about this overpeopled and overdrawn epic is that it is frequently interrupted for long commercials and is forced to go into a week's remission at the end of an hour."

Baird Searles commented negatively on the episode, summing it up as "pretty rudimentary s/f". Although he found it "fun to watch in a mindless way", with good visuals, he regretted that despite Series 2's modified format the production still "couldn't get around to a minor matter such as getting sensible writers [...] who could put out stories that at least made a try at convincing speculative concepts." He argued that the writing was hampered by its set act structure, which called for a cliffhanger "at least every ten minutes".

Jay Allen Sanford wrote that it "may have been the show's worst episode, right up there with Lost in Space's 'Vegetable Rebellion' or [Star] Trek's widely ridiculed 'Spock's Brain'." He was unimpressed by Brian Blessed as Mentor, negatively noting the character's "rainbow-coloured wig and beard".

John Kenneth Muir called the episode a "stunning debut" for Series 2, commenting that it "eschews metaphysics and atmosphere and concentrates instead on good old-fashioned storytelling". Although he found it regrettable that there is no explanation for the absence of Bergman or the other departed regulars, he praised the writing of the remaining characters, whom he found "more openly caring" and likeable than in Series 1.

== Novelisation ==
The episode was adapted in the first Year Two Space: 1999 novel Planets of Peril by Michael Butterworth, published in 1977. It contains the original character names of Hays, Macinlock and Jameson. The script's multiple revisions may have confused the author: Tony Verdeschi is left in command of Alpha while Simon Hays accompanies Koenig to Psychon. The dialogue detailing Bergman's fate is included.

In the 2003 novel The Forsaken written by John Kenneth Muir, it is stated the events of this story were one of the consequences of the death of the eponymous intelligence depicted in "Space Brain". The Brain controlled the space warps within its influence; after its death, they would become unpredictable and unstable. This would allow the Moon to be flung within range of Psychon immediately before the episode.
