= Fred Freiberger =

American film and television writer and television producer

- Born: February 19, 1915
- Died: March 2, 2003 (aged 88)
- Occupations: Television writer and producer Screenwriter
- Years active: 1946–89
- Television: Ben Casey (season 3); The Wild Wild West(season 1); Star Trek (season 3) (1968–69); Space: 1999 (season 2) (1976–77); The Six Million Dollar Man (1977–78)
- Spouse: Shirley Freiberger
- Children: 2

Fred Freiberger (February 19, 1915 – March 2, 2003) was an American film and television writer and television producer, whose career spanned four decades and work on films such as The Beast from 20,000 Fathoms (1953) and TV series including Ben Casey (1963–64), The Wild Wild West (1965), Star Trek (1968–69) and Space: 1999 (1976–77).

His screenwriting credits include 13 films made between 1946 and 1958. He appeared as himself in the short documentary Funny Old Guys, which aired as part of the HBO series Still Kicking, Still Laughing in 2003, a few months after his death in March.

Freiberger died on March 2, 2003, at his Bel-Air home, according to his son, Ben. No cause of death was given.

== Early life and career ==
Freiberger was born to a Jewish family in New York City. In the late 1930s, he worked in advertising in New York. During World War II, he was stationed in England with the United States Eighth Air Force, but was shot down over Germany and spent two years as a prisoner of war. After the war, Freiberger moved to Hollywood with the intention of working in film publicity, but a studio strike saw him move into screenwriting. He was associated with Buddy Rogers' Comet Productions and Columbia Pictures. He was one of the four credited writers on the monster movie The Beast from 20,000 Fathoms (1953).

== Television career ==
From 1958, Freiberger worked almost exclusively in television. As a writer, he contributed scripts for dozens of TV shows between 1952 and 1989. As a producer, his first assignment was in 1960 on the medical drama Ben Casey. This was followed by a stint producing The Wild Wild West during its turbulent first season (1965–66). As the second of six producers in that single season, he supervised ten episodes and introduced the series memorable recurring arch-villain, Dr. Miguelito Quixote Loveless, played by Michael Dunn.

In 1968, Freiberger was hired as producer for the third and final season of Star Trek. He then returned to writing, scripting episodes for a number of early-1970s TV series, including All in the Family, Emergency!, Starsky and Hutch and Ironside, and also worked as a story editor at Hanna-Barbera on the TV series The New Scooby-Doo Movies and Super Friends. Freiberger then moved on to produce the second (and last) season of the British sci-fi series Space: 1999 (1976–77), the final season of The Six Million Dollar Man (1977–78), and the short-lived Beyond Westworld (1980). Toward the end of his career, he wrote six episodes of the 1980s syndicated series Superboy.

=== Producing Star Trek ===
Freiberger had been interviewed for the producer role on Star Trek before the series began production in 1966, but had left the selection process due to a planned trip. In 1968, Star Trek creator Gene Roddenberry resigned as showrunner as a result of creative differences with broadcaster NBC. Freiberger was contacted and hired to produce the series' third season. He assumed this role with considerable budget cutbacks as well as a new "Friday night death slot" that resulted in a further decline in viewing ratings for what was already a low-rated program. Many Star Trek fans have since criticised Freiberger for being the cause of this decline, but actress Nichelle Nichols (who played Uhura), citing the budget cuts, wrote in his defense:

you saw fewer outdoor location shots, for example. Top writers, top guest stars, top anything you needed was harder to come by. Thus, Star Trek's demise became a self-fulfilling prophecy. And I can assure you, that is exactly as it was meant to be ... In the third season [the] new producer Fred Freiberger did everything he could to shore up the show. I know that some fans hold him responsible for the show's decline, but that is not fair. Star Trek was in a disintegrating orbit before Fred came aboard. That we were able to do even what we did is a miracle and a credit to him. One day Fred and I had an exchange, and he snapped at me. Even then, though, I knew he wasn't angry with me but with his unenviable situation. He was a producer who had nothing to produce with.

=== Producing Space: 1999 ===
On 15 December 1975, Freiberger was confirmed as both script editor and producer for the second season of Gerry Anderson's British science-fiction TV series Space: 1999, recruited in part to make the series more appealing to the American market. To that end, Freiberger re-worked the series with major cast and character changes, a heightened emphasis on action and drama, and even ensured that signs appearing in the episodes used American English spelling. He also wrote three episodes for the show's second season, under the pen name "Charles Woodgrove", a pseudonym he had employed when writing for movies and television in the USA: he first used that name as a screenwriter on the movie The Beast from 20,000 Fathoms (1953), and subsequently in writing television episodes of the 1960s Western series Rawhide.

=== Negative reputation in science fiction fandom ===
Freiberger has a dubious reputation in science-fiction fandom due to his involvement in the final seasons of Star Trek, Space: 1999, and The Six Million Dollar Man. All were cancelled on his watch. He also produced the cartoon series Josie and the Pussycats in Outer Space, which ran only one season, although most Saturday morning cartoons had short runs. In some circles this resulted in Freiberger being nicknamed "the Showkiller" or "the Serial Killer". Additionally, some fans of Star Trek and Space: 1999 felt that he downplayed the intelligent tone of those series in favor of stories and characters that were more one-dimensional.

Both William Shatner and Nichelle Nichols of Star Trek refused to assign any blame to Freiberger in this manner. In regard to the cancellation of Space: 1999, Frieberger said in an interview: "Because the powers in control decided that the first season was not successful does not mean that the productions were not well done in terms of the acting, the directing, the stories. There are many reasons why a series is canceled other than quality of the episodes. Ratings are the economic driving force. Are people watching the series? Obviously not enough. Lew Grade and his advisors decided that if the show was to succeed in the second year, it could not be the same as the first season. Changes were made. And obviously, the public did not respond so the series came to an end. It seems to me a waste of energy to argue that one year was better than the other—neither season attracted enough audience to sustain the series."
