= Tony Anholt =

British actor (1941–2002)

- Anholt in The Protectors
- Born: Anthony Anholt; 19 January 1941; Singapore
- Died: 26 July 2002 (aged 61); London, England
- Occupation: Actor
- Years active: 1965–2002
- Spouses: Sheila Willet (m. 1964; div. 1986) Tracey Childs (m. 1990; div. 1998)
- Children: Christien Anholt

Anthony Anholt (19 January 1941 – 26 July 2002) was a British television actor, known for several television roles over several decades. He is known for his role as Charles Frere in the BBC drama series Howards' Way (1985–90).

== Early life ==
Anholt was born 19 January 1941 in Singapore to an Anglo-Dutch family. They moved to Australia before the end of the Second World War, then to South Africa for a brief time, eventually settling in the United Kingdom, where Anholt was educated at Cranleigh School in south Surrey. His father had been taken prisoner by the Japanese, was forced to work on the Burma Railway, and died when his son was three. His mother remarried five years later.

== Career ==
Anholt was originally a continuity announcer for the BBC World Service.

He was a regular in two series produced by Gerry Anderson - The Protectors (1972–74) as Paul Buchet and Space: 1999 (1976–77) playing the role of Security Chief Tony Verdeschi in the second series.

In 1974 he was cast as Mark Colebrook, a crooked architect in Contact Breaker the 12th episode of the first series of the police drama, The Sweeney. Anholt appeared in an episode of Juliet Bravo in 1984 as Martin Lee.

His only credited film role was as an FBI agent in Fear Is the Key in 1972; he also made appearances in the 1984 miniseries The Last Days of Pompeii and as small-time crook Abdul, in the Only Fools and Horses episode To Hull and Back.

His last filmed acting work was for Canadian television productions; he appeared in small roles in several episodes of Lexx and also guest-starred in his son Christien's series, Relic Hunter as the character of Vincent de Bourdin, Series 1, episode 19 (title "Love Letter", aired 1 May 2000).

== Personal life ==
Anholt was married and divorced twice. His first marriage was to Sheila Willet in 1964; they had a son, Christien, who is also an actor. Anholt and Willet divorced in 1986. His second marriage was from 1990 to 1998 and was to actress Tracey Childs, his co-star in Howards' Way.

== Death ==
Anholt died in London aged 61 on 26 July 2002 after a long illness caused by a brain tumour.

== Filmography ==
Year	Title	Role	Notes
1971	Kate	Bruce Rogers	
1972	The Strauss Family	Eduard Strauss	
1972	Fear Is the Key	FBI Man	
1972-1974	The Protectors	Paul Buchet	42 episodes
1976	Thriller	Johnny Baxter	1 episode: "A Midsummer Nightmare"
1976-1977	Space: 1999	Tony Verdeschi	22 episodes
1979	Citizen Smith	José	1 episode: "Spanish Fly"
1981	The Last Days of Pompeii	Lepidus	
1984	Minder	Johnny Petselli	1 episode: "Windows"
1984	Triangle	Nick Stevens	
1985	Only Fools and Horses	Abdul	1 episode: "To Hull and Back"
1985-1990	Howards' Way	Charles Frere	72 episodes
2000	Relic Hunter	Vincent de Bourdin	1 episode: "Love Letter"
