= List of Space: 1999 books and other media =

The science fiction television series Space: 1999 has generated a wide range of licensed media, including novelisations and original novels, audio dramas, comic books, and toys and games.

At the time of the series' original run, several comic book series were published. In the United States, a series of audio adaptations for younger audiences were produced. After 1999, many of the comic book stories were revised and reprinted, together with new stories.

== Novels and novelisations ==
=== 1970s ===
In the mid-1970s, a number of books were published by Futura Publications and Wyndham Publications in the UK, and Pocket Books and Warner Books in the United States. Most of these were novelisations of Space: 1999 episodes. These releases, mainly paperback, were supplemented by 16-page photo sections (Year One and Two in the United States, Year Two only in the United Kingdom), which comprised black-and-white stills from the episodes. Original novels, without photo section, also formed a part of the series. Many of the books were also translated for release in overseas markets, such as Germany, Turkey and Japan.

==== In English ====
- Breakaway (February 1975) by E.C. Tubb. Novelisation of "Breakaway", "Matter of Life and Death", "Ring Around the Moon" and "Black Sun".
- Moon Odyssey (February 1975) by John Rankine. Novelisation of "Alpha Child", "The Last Sunset", "Voyager's Return" and "Another Time, Another Place".
- The Space Guardians (August 1975) by Brian Ball. Novelisation of "Missing Link", "Force of Life" and "Guardian of Piri".
- Collision Course (August 1975) by E.C. Tubb. Novelisation of "Collision Course", "The Full Circle", "End of Eternity" and "Death's Other Dominion".
- Lunar Attack (November 1975) by John Rankine. Novelisation of "War Games", "The Troubled Spirit", "The Last Enemy" and "Space Brain".
- Astral Quest (Christmas 1975) by John Rankine. Novelisation of "The Infernal Machine", "Mission of the Darians", "Dragon's Domain" and "The Testament of Arkadia".
- Alien Seed (August 1976) by E.C. Tubb (original novel)
- Android Planet (August 1976) by John Rankine (original novel)
- Phoenix of Megaron (November 1976) by John Rankine (original novel – US only)
- Rogue Planet (end 1976) by E.C. Tubb (original novel)
- Planets of Peril (January 1977) by Michael Butterworth. Novelisation of "The Metamorph", "The AB Chrysalis", "The Rules of Luton" and "New Adam New Eve".
- Earthfall (March 1977) by E.C. Tubb. Original novel, published in the UK only. This concluded the Space: 1999 storyline and had the descendants of the Alphans returning to Earth.
- Mind-Breaks of Space (April 1977) by J. Jeff Jones and Michael Butterworth. Novelisation of "Brian the Brain", "The Mark of Archanon", "Catacombs of the Moon" and "One Moment of Humanity".
- The Space-Jackers (May 1977) by Michael Butterworth. Novelisation of "Seed of Destruction", "A Matter of Balance", "The Exiles" and "The Beta Cloud".
- The Psychomorph (June 1977) by Michael Butterworth. Novelisation of "The Lambda Factor" and "The Bringers of Wonder".
- The Time Fighters (August 1977) by Michael Butterworth. Novelisation of "Space Warp", "Dorzak", "Devil's Planet" and "The Seance Spectre".
- The Edge of the Infinite (1977) by Michael Butterworth. Published in the US only. Novelisation of "All That Glisters", "Journey to Where", "The Dorcons" and "The Immunity Syndrome".

==== In other languages ====
Space: 1999 novels and novelisations were also written in other languages for specific markets, mainly Germany and Italy.

In Italy, adaptations of all 24 Year One episodes and eight of the Year Two episodes were published in oversized hardback volumes. These books typically contained two episodes and nearly 100 colour photos each.

In Germany, the Butterworth Year Two novels were translated into German, with one significant difference. The ending of "The Edge of the Infinite" was altered to set up events that would be continued in six original follow-on novels. The first two novels in the series were translated and published in Japan by Mikasa Shobo.

- Das Andromeda-Rätsel (literally The Andromeda Riddle) by H.W. Springer (pseudonym of Hans Wolf Sommer)
- Das Erbe der Roboter (literally The Robots' Heritage) by H.W. Springer
- Die Ewigen von Luna (literally The Eternals of Luna) by H.W. Springer
- Invasion der Esper (literally Invasion of the Espers) by H.W. Springer
- Aktion Exodus (analogously Operation Exodus) by Kurt Brand
- Der Stahlplanet (literally The Steel Planet) by M.F. Thomas

The final novel, Der Stahlplanet, concludes the Space: 1999 odyssey by having the Alphans teleport to Texas City, Earth via the neutrino transmission process introduced in "Journey to Where".

=== 21st century ===
In 2002, Fanderson published a new edition of the novel Earthfall which corrected the typographic errors of the original publication and, with the permission of the author, separated the novel into its three component sections: Part One, "Breakaway" (set in September 1999); Part Two, "Colony Alpha" (January 2000); and Part Three, "Earthfall" (October 2018). Fanderson went on to publish a new original novel, Earthbound, written by E.C. Tubb, in 2003. This book contained an adaptation of "Earthbound", the one episode which was not included in the original novelisation run, as well as adaptations of two scripts of Year Two stories which retained the Year One format in which the scripts had originally been written: "The Exiles" and "The Face of Eden" (or "The Immunity Syndrome"). Also in 2002, Eagle One Media published a new edition of the novel Alien Seed with a new preface by Tubb. The same year, Powys Media launched a new series of officially licensed original novels and related works of non-fiction, and revised and expanded omnibus editions of previously issued novelisations for Year Two. All books are English-language releases, sold only through the companies' websites.

==== Powys Media titles ====
- Resurrection by William Latham, foreword by Johnny Byrne (original novel), 2002. A sequel to "End of Eternity" in the Year One format.
- The Forsaken by John Kenneth Muir, foreword by Prentis Hancock (original novel), 2003. Reprinted in a revised edition on 23 January 2013. An original novel placed between Years One and Two. Paul Morrow and Tanya Alexander are written out of the series.
- Survival by Brian Ball, foreword by Barry Morse (original novel), 2005. An original novel, placed between Years One and Two, that depicts the fate of Professor Victor Bergman.
- Eternity Unbound by William Latham, 2005. A Balor trilogy. Part One depicts the events on Progron 1000 years before the present, while Part Two is a script-to-prose adaption of "End of Eternity", and Part Three is a revised reprint of Latham's novel Resurrection.
- Year Two by Michael Butterworth, 2005. A re-issue of the six Butterworth novelisations published in the 1970s. The stories are now placed in chronological order and have been re-written to conform more to their broadcast versions where necessary. "The Taybor" is adapted and inserted into the narrative. New material is introduced to link the stories together and give them some continuity not only with Year One, but also with the range of published and forthcoming Powys Space: 1999 novels.
- Shepherd Moon – an anthology by various authors, published January 2010.
- Born for Adversity by David A. McIntee, foreword and afterword by Catherine Schell (original novel), February 2010. Set in Year Three.
- Omega by William Latham, foreword by Christopher Penfold (original novel), March 2010. Set in Year Three.
- Alpha by William Latham, afterword by Christopher Penfold (original novel), March 2010. Set in Year Three.
- Android Planet by John Rankine (revised reissue of original novel), 3 February 2011. Set in Year One.
- Phoenix of Megaron by John Rankine (revised reissue of original novel), 14 September 2012. Set in Year One.
- Johnny Byrne's Children of the Gods by William Latham, 23 January 2013. Set in Year Three.
- The Whispering Sea by John Kenneth Muir (original novel), February 2014. Set in Year Two.
- The Final Revolution by William Latham, foreword by Barbara Bain (original novel), July 2015. Set in Year Three.
- Rogue Planet by E.C. Tubb, foreword by Philip Harbottle (revised reissue of original novel), November 2019, reissued September 2020. Set in Year One.
- Year One by Brian Ball, John Rankine and E.C. Tubb, January 2020. A re-issue of the six first season novelisations published in the 1970s. The stories are now placed in chronological order and have been revised to conform more to their broadcast versions where necessary. "Earthbound" has been newly adapted and inserted into the narrative. New material is introduced to link the stories together and give them some continuity not only with Year Two, but with the range of published and forthcoming Powys Space: 1999 novels. The first edition is signed and numbered. A second edition was further revised to fix typos in the 1st edition.
- Alien Seed by E.C. Tubb, foreword by Philip Harbottle (revised reissue of original novel), November 2020. Set in Year One.
- Earthfall by E.C. Tubb, forewords by Philip Harbottle and Anton Phillips (original novel), November 2021.
- Earthbound by E.C. Tubb, forewords by Philip Harbottle and Patricia T. Sokol (novelisation), October 2022.
- Odysseus Wept by William Latham, foreword by Prentis Hancock, afterword by John Kenneth Muir (original novel), May 2023. This novel was released in hardcover, trade paperback and mass market paperback editions.
- Alien Seed/Rogue Planet by E.C. Tubb (two 1970s novels, as originally published, in a single hardcover volume).
- Android Planet/Phoenix of Megaron by John Rankine (two 1970s novels, as originally published, in a single hardcover volume).

==== Other titles ====
- Earthfall by E.C. Tubb (original novel, Fanderson release)
- Earthbound by E.C. Tubb (novelisation of "Earthbound", Fanderson release)
- Alien Seed by E.C. Tubb (original novel, Eagle One Media release)

== Non-fiction books ==
- The Making of Space: 1999 by Tim Heald (Ballantine Books, 1976) – a making-of with episode guide, which is incomplete as the book was published before the series had finished airing.
- The Moonbase Alpha Technical Notebook (published by Starlog magazine, 1977) – includes blueprints of Moonbase Alpha and illustrated information on props and costumes
- Cosmos 1999: L'épopée de la blancheur by Pierre Fageolle (published by DLM Editions, 1993) – socio-cultural analysis of the series, in French
- UFO & Space: 1999 by Chris Drake (Boxtree, 1994) – overview and episode summaries
- Exploring Space: 1999: An Episode Guide and Complete History of the Mid-1970s Science Fiction Television Series (McFarland & Company, 1997) – monograph by John Kenneth Muir
- Destination: Moonbase Alpha: The Unofficial and Unauthorised Guide to Space: 1999 by Robert E. Wood (Telos Publishing, 2010) – with foreword by Zienia Merton and afterword by Barry Morse
- Chasing the Cyclops by William Latham (Powys Media, 2011) – details the writing process of the Latham novels Omega and Alpha
- Space: 1999 – The Powysverse Compendium by Patricia Sokol (Powys Media, 2012) – analyses the Powys Media novels, short stories and audiobooks. Foreword by Zienia Merton.
- Cosmos 1999: Le fabulaire de l'espace by Didier Liardet (published by Edition Yris, 2014) – analysis and commentary in French
- Maya: 1999 – Ovvero: I rovesci della seconda stagione by Agamennone Palinsesti (published by Sfacelo chimico, 2019) – analysis and commentary on Series 2, in Italian
- To Everything That Might Have Been: The Lost Universe Of Space: 1999, co-written by Robert E. Wood (Telos Publishing, 2022) – presents previously unpublished scripts and other material
- Space: 1999: The Vault by Chris Bentley (Signum books, 2022) – coffee table book

== Comics ==
In the 1970s, US publisher Charlton Comics released seven issues of a comic based on Space: 1999, as well as eight issues of a black-and-white illustrated magazine featuring more adult-oriented stories. Well-known creators on the comics included John Byrne, Nick Cuti, Joe Staton and Pat Boyette. Charlton only published one issue each of the comic and magazine in the Year Two format.

In Germany, publisher Koralle Verlag produced 18 adaptations of Year One episodes as part of their Zack colour comic anthologies, one adaptation and four original stories in their Zack Parade line, as well as two full-length graphic novel original adventures in their Zack Box imprint. Many of the episodic adaptations were translated and reprinted in Italy.

In the UK, a two-page comic strip appeared in Look-In children's magazine from autumn 1975 to spring 1977. Writer Angus Allan had previously contributed to a number of other Gerry Anderson-based strips in the 1960s for TV Century 21 comic. John M. Burns illustrated the first three stories, to be succeeded by Mike Noble when the strip converted to black-and-white in early 1976. In the autumn of 1976, the strip adopted the Year Two format, with Burns returning for a brief coda story that November. Some of these strips were reprinted in black-and-white as complete compilations in the Portuguese TV Junior comic.

In 2013, a rebooted and new graphic novel appeared, entitled Aftershock and Awe. In this graphic novel, the events of Space: 1999 occur in an alternate history. To Everything That Was, an omnibus featuring remastered comic strips from the Charlton and Look-In series, was also published as part of this line.

== Audio dramas ==
In the 1970s, Power Records produced seven child-oriented audio dramas based on Space: 1999, most adapting Year One episodes; this differed from most other Power Records properties licensed from TV series that relied on original stories. "Breakaway", "Death's Other Dominion" and "Mission of the Darians" were released on a single 33 rpm LP, while a second album contains "End of Eternity" and "Dragon's Domain" accompanied by the two original adventures "Return to the Beginning" (in which the Alphans return to Earth, only to discover they have arrived in Biblical times) and "It Played So Softly on the Ear" (in which the Alphans are abducted by alien scientists to serve as blood donors). In addition, Power Records published individual comic "book-and-record" editions of "Breakaway" and "Return to the Beginning" with 45 rpm vinyl records enclosed.

=== Powys Media releases ===
- Resurrection, an audiobook by William Latham, read by Barry Morse, 7 May 2010
- Spider's Web, an audiobook by William Latham, read by Rupert Booth, 8 November 2010

=== Big Finish releases ===
In 2019, Big Finish Productions received a licence to create full-cast audio dramas re-imagining the series, with Mark Bonnar as Commander Koenig and Maria Teresa Creasey as Dr Russell. Also cast were Timothy Bentinck as Commissioner Simmonds, Clive Hayward as Professor Bergman, Jules de Jongh as Petra Nordstorm and Amaka Okafor as Kano.

The series was written by Nicholas Briggs and script-edited by Jamie Anderson of Anderson Entertainment. The first story, "Breakaway" – an adaptation of the TV episode – was released digitally in September 2019, with a CD edition following that October.

No.	Title	Directed by	Written by	Released	CD Audiobook ISBN
1	"Breakaway"	Nicholas Briggs	Nicholas Briggs	September 2019	9781838680695

Big Finish revealed that an additional boxed set would follow, with the full cast to be announced. In July 2020, Big Finish announced a boxset of three stories. Bonnar, Creasey, Bentinck, Hayward and Okafor reprised their roles, while Anthony Howell, Chris Jarman and Nicholas Asbury joining the cast.

The set, titled Space 1999 Volume 1, contains an adaptation of "Death's Other Dominion" and two new stories, "The Siren Call" and "Goldilocks". It was released in 2021 on both CD and digital download. Space 1999 Volume 2 and Space 1999 Volume 3 followed in 2022 and 2023, respectively.

No.	Title	Directed by	Written by	Released	CD Audiobook ISBN
1	"The Siren Call"	Nicholas Briggs	Andrew Smith	February 2021	9781838682866
2	"Death's Other Dominion"	Nicholas Briggs	Roland Moore (adapted from "Death's Other Dominion" by Anthony Terpiloff and Elizabeth Barrows)	February 2021	9781838682866
3	"Goldilocks"	Nicholas Briggs	Andrew Smith	February 2021	9781838682866

Space: 1999 Volume 2: Earthbound was released in February/March 2022.

No.	Title	Directed by	Written by	Released	CD Audiobook ISBN
1	"Mooncatcher"	Nicholas Briggs	Marc Platt	February 2022	9781838687304
2	"Earthbound"	Nicholas Briggs	Iain Meadows	February 2022	9781838687304
3	"Journey's End"	Nicholas Briggs	Nicholas Briggs	February 2022	9781838687304

Space: 1999 Volume 3: Dragon's Domain was released in May 2023.

No.	Title	Directed by	Written by	Released	CD Audiobook ISBN
1	"Skull in the Sky"	Nicholas Briggs	Marc Platt	May 2023	9781802400700
2	"The Godhead Interrogative"	Nicholas Briggs	Nicholas Briggs	May 2023	9781802400700
3	"Dragon's Domain"	Nicholas Briggs	Nicholas Briggs	May 2023	9781802400700

== Toys and games ==
Mattel created a line of toys to tie into the TV series, including the Eagle 1 Spaceship. Released in 1976, the Eagle 1 is over 2.5 feet long and a foot wide. The Eagle 1 is made mostly of injection-moulded plastic and has a number of parts and accessories.

Dinky Toys also released various die-cast metal Eagle ships, with different colours and features. Released from 1975 onwards, these were approximately 9 inches in length and came in green, white or blue coloured metal with plastic trims and differing module sections for each colour.

In 1975, Palitoy in the UK released several Space: 1999 8-inch action figures, including John Koenig, Paul Morrow and Alan Carter, along with two alien characters seen in the series.

Several companies released Space: 1999 board games in the 1970s, each different from the others. Omnia released their board game in the UK and Denmark, Milton Bradley released one in the US, Clementoni released a board game in Italy, and Yuma released one in Turkey which was basically a reprinted version of Kenner's Star Wars – Escape from the Death Star board game but with Space: 1999 characters and designs instead.

In July 2024, Modiphius Entertainment announced a tabletop role-playing game adaptation set to release in time for the 50th anniversary of the show in 2025.

== Compilation films ==
In the 1970s and 1980s, several feature-length compilation films were assembled from various Space: 1999 episodes. One aim was to provide content for new American and European cable and satellite TV stations (and for theatrical release, which occurred in a number of European countries). One film, Spazio 1999, was created specifically for theatrical release in Italy. With the exception of Spazio 1999, the films were released on home video years before the individual episodes.

- Spazio 1999 is a mid-1970s Italian release consisting of heavily edited segments from the episodes "Breakaway", "Ring Around the Moon" and "Another Time, Another Place". Released months before Space: 1999 was first broadcast in the country, it features a score by film composer Ennio Morricone, replacing the original score by Barry Gray.
- Destination: Moonbase Alpha, released in 1978 by ITC London, was the first widely available re-edit of Space: 1999, based on the two-part story "The Bringers of Wonder". The narrator informs viewers that the year is 2100 and that Moonbase Alpha draws its power from nuclear waste. Until the series was released on DVD, for many countries this film remained the only way to see "The Bringers of Wonder", as the story was omitted from syndication.
- Alien Attack, released in 1979 by ITC London, retroactively introduces foreign audiences to the premise of the series with a compilation of "Breakaway" and "War Games". It moves events from 1999 far into the 21st century. This film includes some original footage shot without the series cast, specifically scenes set in the offices of the International Lunar Commission on Earth. Patrick Allen appears as a senior commission official.
- Journey Through the Black Sun, released in 1982 by ITC New York, combines "Collision Course" and "Black Sun". Scenes from both episodes, such as Captain Carter confronting Commander Koenig in "Black Sun", were cut.
- Cosmic Princess, also released in 1982 by ITC New York, focuses on the Year Two character Maya and combines "The Metamorph" and "Space Warp". The alien's dialogue from "Space Warp" is altered, and the alien's difficulties, as well as Maya's condition, are presented as being directly related to "The Metamorph" as if the events of that episode occurred only days before. Several scenes, such as Maya's father Mentor chiding her for what he views as misuse of her shapeshifting abilities, were cut. This film appeared in an early episode of the movie-mocking series Mystery Science Theater 3000.

Some American VHS editions of the English-language releases include specially filmed introductions by actress Sybil Danning, who never appeared in the series. Martin Landau and Barbara Bain were reportedly upset at this re-packaging and launched legal proceedings.

== Message from Moonbase Alpha ==
Message from Moonbase Alpha, with Zienia Merton as Sandra Benes.

Message from Moonbase Alpha is a fan-produced short film written by Space: 1999 script editor Johnny Byrne.

The premise of the film, set decades after the events of the series, is that Alpha's life support systems have started to fail. A space warp has propelled the Moon to within range of an Earth-like planet, which the Alphans have dubbed Terra Alpha. Following a vote, Commander Koenig has made the decision for everyone to evacuate Alpha and settle on the planet before the Moon travels out of range. Maya has devised a way for Alpha to send a message back to Earth using another space warp. Sandra Benes (Zienia Merton, reprising her role from the series) is the last to leave. She tearfully transmits the message to Earth, then shuts down Alpha's systems. The film ends with the sound of the Meta signal (an exoplanetary transmission featured in the first episode), indicating that the transmission the Alphans picked up decades earlier originated from themselves in their own future.

Shot in a private home on 29 August 1999, the seven-minute film used a working replica of Alpha's technical section and the original prop of Koenig's Command Center desk, with Merton wearing her original Year Two costume.

The film was first shown at the Space: 1999 Breakaway Convention in Los Angeles on 13 September 1999 – the day the events of the first episode take place. With the permission of copyright owners Carlton Media International, the film included a number of clips from the series. Journalist Shaqui Le Vesconte described the convention showing of the film as "a short but satisfying closure to Space: 1999." Modified versions of the film were released on DVD bonus discs in the US, Canada, France and Italy. The original version appears as a special feature on the Space: 1999/UFO – The Documentaries DVD by Fanderson.

== See also ==
- List of television series made into books
