= War Games (Space: 1999) =

- Space: 1999 episode
- The Mark IX Hawk makes its sole appearance in this episode. The model was partly re‑painted orange to distinguish it from the Eagles.
- Episode no.: Series 1 Episode 10
- Directed by: Charles Crichton
- Written by: Christopher Penfold
- Editing by: Alan Killick
- Production code: SP 17
- Original air date: 25 September 1975

Guest appearances
- Isla Blair as the female alien; Anthony Valentine as the male alien; James Fagan as Pete Johnson; Sarah Bullen as Kate; Robert Atiko as an Alphan operative; Paul Weston and Colin Skeaping as decompression victims

Episode chronology
← Previous "Space Brain"	Next → "End of Eternity"

"War Games" is the tenth episode of the first series of Space: 1999. The screenplay was written by Christopher Penfold; the director was Charles Crichton. The final shooting script is dated 15 October 1974. Live-action filming took place Thursday 24 October 1974 through Thursday 7 November 1974.

== Plot ==
As the Moon passes through a star system, Alpha's sensors detect a habitable planet supporting an advanced civilisation. Three spacecraft are launched towards the Moon. Inexplicably, they are Mark IX Hawks – fighter craft developed on Earth. Declaring battle stations, Commander Koenig launches combat Eagles led by Captain Carter. Though outmanoeuvred, the Eagles shoot down the Hawks.

More Hawks arrive. Koenig activates another Eagle squadron but the Eagles are destroyed on their launchpads. Alpha takes heavy damage and a number of occupants, including Dr Mathias, are killed in explosive decompressions. Following the Hawks is a bomber. Carter, piloting the only surviving Eagle, manages to destroy the bomber and the explosion takes all the surviving Hawks with it.

Alpha is in ruins with over 100 casualties and only a few days' emergency power. With the next star system months away, the Alphans' only hope is to seek asylum on the planet that attacked them. Koenig and Dr Russell take an unarmed Eagle down to one of the cities to negotiate with the inhabitants: humanoids with enlarged crania, who are seated within transparent columns. Koenig condemns the aliens' hostility, but the aliens tell him that they view humanity as a threat. Desperate, Koenig begins destroying the surroundings but is shot dead.

Russell suddenly finds herself seated in one of the column-habitats, her mind at peace. Telling her that their species has evolved beyond fear, the aliens offer her the power to make Koenig live again. Koenig is resurrected and tries to free Russell, but is repelled by an energy barrier. Taking off in the Eagle, he rendezvouses with Carter in space and the two set off back to the planet in a combat Eagle. However, they collide with an energy field and the ship disintegrates. Both eject but Carter's visor smashes, killing him. Koenig is left adrift.

Russell has become part of a macrobrain powered by the aliens' combined life-force. Her hosts insist that their actions were not defensive – they have no fear, and thus no need for war machines. The Alphans, on the other hand, are full of fear. Russell senses Koenig's predicament and wants to rescue him. The aliens try to stop her: Koenig has accepted death and thus conquered fear; saving him would revive that fear and potentially destroy them all. Russell prevails and Koenig is brought down to the surface. He fires his laser weapon at the aliens, starting a chain reaction that devastates the whole planet.

Suddenly Koenig is back on the undamaged Alpha, about to order the Eagles to fire on the first wave of Hawks. He locks eyes with Russell and realisation hits; he tells the Eagles to stand down and the Hawks vanish. Professor Bergman wonders if this means that the Alphans can settle on the planet, but the voice of the aliens replies that they cannot. The voice confirms that everything they experienced was an illusion to demonstrate humanity's destructiveness. The aliens' only way to stop the Alphans coming to their planet was to make their worst fears seem real.

The Alphans try to make sense of the experience. All that Russell remembers are flashes of a world without fear.

== Regular cast ==
- Martin Landau as Commander John Koenig
- Barbara Bain as Dr Helena Russell
- Barry Morse as Professor Victor Bergman
- Prentis Hancock as Controller Paul Morrow
- Clifton Jones as David Kano
- Zienia Merton as Sandra Benes
- Anton Phillips as Dr Bob Mathias
- Nick Tate as Captain Alan Carter
- Suzanne Roquette as Tanya Alexander (uncredited)

== Production ==
Originally proposed in George Bellak's list of potential stories, "War Games" was penned by story consultant Christopher Penfold. Along with "Black Sun" and "Collision Course", it is considered to be one of the programme's most successful instalments by actors, production staff and fans alike, exemplifying Space: 1999's metaphysical approach to science fiction. ITC's New York executives initially rejected the script as it seemed to them to kill off members of the regular cast; it was finally approved for production after Penfold explained the ending. At this point, frustrated at the direction he felt ITC's creative decisions were taking the show, Penfold began to consider leaving the series.

The episode incorporated several themes Penfold frequently visited in his work. He felt mankind could be seen as an invading virus, spreading destruction in space akin to the Spanish conquistadores' devastation of the New World. It also included anti-war sentiments, his distrust of nuclear technology and the concept of the macro-brain—seen later in "Space Brain". Barry Morse felt it showcased George Bernard Shaw's belief that mankind's worst destructiveness comes either through anger or from fear, which usually prove to be without foundation.

Actress Zienia Merton affirms this episode furthered her belief that director Charles Crichton owned significant shares in the company which produced Fuller's earth, the dust-like substance used in films to simulate explosions, create sand- or dust-storms, or age props or costumes. After the dust-storms in the Crichton-helmed "Matter of Life and Death" and "The Last Sunset", the product was mixed with falling debris during the attack on Alpha. Trays were suspended above the Main Mission and Medical Centre sets and tipped onto the cast. Merton avoided the mess by diving under her desk; others, including Martin Landau and Prentis Hancock, were not as fortunate.

The alien battleship seen here, designed by Martin Bower, made its debut in the episode "Alpha Child"; it would later appear in "Dragon's Domain" and "The Metamorph". The brain-complex instrumentation was originally constructed for the Kaldorian ship in "Earthbound". The aliens' transparent column-habitats would be re-vamped into growing compartments for "The Troubled Spirit" and other episodes set in Alpha's Hydroponics department.

The Hawk spacecraft, also designed by Bower, made its first and only appearance in this story. In response to concerns that it would appear too similar to the Eagles when filmed, Bray Studios technician Cyril Foster hurriedly painted orange details on the miniatures before the shoot. The model was used in a number of visual-effects publicity stills, including some where it can be seen attacking the Bethan gunship from "The Last Enemy".

During the making of the episode, the Space: 1999 sets received a visit from George Lucas, an admirer of the series' special effects. One of the model shots – a moving spacecraft filmed from underneath, looming into view from the top of the frame – inspired the opening of the Star Destroyer–Tantive IV chase in Star Wars (1977).

=== Music ===
In addition to the regular Barry Gray score (drawn primarily from "Breakaway" and "Another Time, Another Place"), Mike Hankinson's composition 'The Astronauts' is used during the dogfight sequence as well as the Alpha attack scenes.

== Reception ==
"War Games" has had a mixed critical response. Reviews in Dreamwatch magazine praised the special effects but criticised other aspects, such as the plot. The later of the two Dreamwatch reviews rated the episode 8 out of 10. SFX magazine gave it an "A minus", commentator James O'Neill rated it 2 out of 4, and SciFiNow magazine rated it 5 out of 5. Video Watchdog considered it better than average, commenting that "those who value the show for its action and special effects will find the first half highly enjoyable" even if the ending is predictable.

John Kenneth Muir described it as "perhaps the most visually spectacular science fiction television episode in the history of the medium. However, beyond the spectacle and awe-inspiring special effects, 'War Games' has little to recommend it. The story is confusing and nonsensical when it should be tightly plotted and frightening." He questioned the logic of the aliens' tactics and criticises the "poor writing" that allows Russell, twice, to use their mysterious powers to rescue Koenig. Although it praised the special effects and "sense of desperation", TV Zone magazine rated "War Games" the worst instalment of Space: 1999's first series, commenting that its use of illusion as a narrative technique "feels like a cheat" and criticising the "frankly bizarre" guest performances of Blair and Valentine, describing these as "a textbook example of how not to 'act alien'."

In a 1977 interview, both Martin Landau and Barbara Bain named this episode a personal favourite of Space: 1999, Bain because the story was "rich in concept".

== Novelisation ==
The episode was adapted in the fifth Year One Space: 1999 novel Lunar Attack by John Rankine, published in 1975.
