= Dragon's Domain =

- Space: 1999 episode
- Episode no.: Series 1 Episode 4
- Directed by: Charles Crichton
- Written by: Christopher Penfold
- Editing by: Alan Killick
- Production code: SP 23
- Original air date: 13 September 1975

Guest appearances
- Gianni Garko as Captain Tony Cellini; Douglas Wilmer as Commissioner Dixon; Barbara Kellerman as Dr Bouchere; Michael Sheard as Dr King; Susan Jameson as Professor Mackie; James Fagan as Pete Johnson; Bob Sherman as Newsreader; Gwen Taylor as Hospital Nurse; Sarah Bullen as Kate

Episode chronology
← Previous "The Infernal Machine"	Next → "The Testament of Arkadia"

"Dragon's Domain" is the fourth episode of the first series of Space: 1999. The screenplay was written by Christopher Penfold; the director was Charles Crichton. The final shooting script was dated 21 January 1975, with blue-page amendments dated 29 January 1975 and yellow-page amendments dated 30 January 1975. Live-action filming took place Monday 27 January 1975 through Monday 10 February 1975. The episode was first broadcast in the UK on 23 October 1975, having previously aired on KRON-TV, San Francisco on 13 September 1975.

== Plot ==
On Moonbase Alpha, Captain Tony Cellini experiences a vision of a nameless enemy that he perceives as a mass of light and piercing sound. He attempts to take off in an Eagle Transporter but old friend Commander Koenig stuns him with a laser first.

Dr Russell believes that Cellini is dealing with unresolved trauma from a mission to the exoplanet Ultra in 1996, before the Moon was ejected from the Solar System. On reaching their destination, the crew of the Ultra Probe, piloted by Cellini, encountered a collection of derelict alien spacecraft. When the crew docked with one of the ships, they were attacked by an enormous, shrieking, tentacled creature with a single luminous eye and a fiery maw. The monster hypnotised Cellini's shipmates, devoured each of them alive, and then regurgitated their charred remains. Weapons had no effect on the creature and Cellini was forced to flee, blasting the command module free of the probe ship to use as an escape pod.

After a six months alone in space, Cellini reached Earth. His accomplishment was quickly overshadowed by mass disbelief of his horrific story. The World Space Commission ruled that there had been no creature and that the other crewmembers had been killed in a decompression accident. Cellini remained in Russell's psychiatric care until Koenig was made commander of Alpha and gave him a position at the Moonbase.

Cellini tells Koenig and Russell that his attempt to leave Alpha was in response to a feeling that the creature is near and he must face it again. When the Moon eventually drifts near the spacecraft graveyard, Ultra Probe is revealed to still be docked. Koenig prepares to investigate in an Eagle. Determined to face the creature alone, Cellini hi-jacks the Eagle and docks with the probe. The creature re-appears, with Cellini attacking it with a fire axe before it seizes him in its tentacles. Koenig arrives with reinforcements in a second Eagle, and witnesses Cellini perishing in the same way as his crew. Koenig deduces the creature's weakness is its eye and destroys it with Cellini's axe.

As the Moon leaves the graveyard, Russell closes Cellini's medical file. While talking with Koenig, she muses that when the Alphans eventually find a new home, they will need to reinvent humanity's mythology. She suggests a new fairytale: Tony Cellini and the Monster; akin to Saint George and the Dragon.

== Regular cast ==
- Martin Landau as Commander John Koenig
- Barbara Bain as Dr Helena Russell
- Barry Morse as Professor Victor Bergman
- Prentis Hancock as Controller Paul Morrow
- Clifton Jones as David Kano
- Zienia Merton as Sandra Benes
- Anton Phillips as Dr Bob Mathias
- Nick Tate as Captain Alan Carter
- Suzanne Roquette as Tanya Alexander (uncredited)

== Production ==
The story, a take on Saint George and the Dragon, was originally conceived as a vehicle for Nick Tate as Captain Alan Carter, with Carter having commanded Ultra Probe and vindicating himself in this story by slaying the beast. In a 1995 interview, Tate described Christopher Penfold's original script as "very much like the film Alien, where this creature kills everyone on board a space station and Alan Carter is sent there to discover what has happened." He said that Penfold had privately shown him the first draft, which is why he "knew" Penfold had written the star role for him. Penfold intended the alien monster to be a giant spider and gave the episode the provisional title of "Web".

Reports indicate that Martin Landau (always cautious of his male castmates — especially Tate — receiving any significant exposure) influenced the production staff to rewrite Tate's part as a one-off guest role. Script editor Johnny Byrne suggested that the rewriting was done by Landau and executive producer Gerry Anderson; Byrne himself did not do it, and Penfold had already resigned from the series.

In the final shooting script, dated 21 January 1975, the Cellini character is named "Jim Calder" and Dr Monique Bouchere is "Olga Vishenskaya". This draft contains no reference to Koenig, Bergman and Dixon mentioning evidence about the spaceship graveyard or Ultra Probe's docking with the alien ship apart from the scanner contacts and Cellini's testimony.

Fulfilling their agreement with RAI, the Italian production company co-funding the first series, Italian actor Gianni Garko was cast in the role of the tortured astronaut, now named Tony Cellini. Garko, though a talented actor, was not a fluent speaker of the English language, and in an ironic twist, asked Tate to help teach him his lines in English.

Many of the spacecraft miniatures seen in the graveyard sequences had been used before in the series: the Sidon ship from "Voyager's Return", the Atherian ship from "Collision Course", the battleship used in "Alpha Child" and "War Games" and the front piece used to transform the battleship into the Deltan gunship in "The Last Enemy". Reports indicated that the visual effects crew shot a sequence including Star Trek's USS Enterprise and Doctor Who's TARDIS, but the footage was never used.

The blue quilted nylon jacket worn by Bergman would be used in the second series as Carter's excursion jacket. The orange versions of the jacket seen on Koenig and Cellini would be worn next episode by security personnel and later, in Series 2, by Maya and various guest stars. The computer banks seen in the main module of Ultra Probe originated in the SHADO Control from the Andersons' previous series UFO. Commissioner Dixon's office on Earth was a redress of M's office from the James Bond film The Man with the Golden Gun. Its red-leather padded door can be seen at the top of the scene.

=== Music ===
In addition to the regular Barry Gray score (drawn primarily from "Matter of Life and Death" and "Another Time, Another Place"), an arrangement of the Remo Giazotto composition Adagio in G Minor for Strings and Organ (incorrectly attributed to Albinoni) is played over the flight sequences of Ultra Probe.

== Reception ==
Some contemporary reviews were negative. The Bristol Evening Post wrote that the episode's "plastic octopus-like monster" takes the audience "back to the bad old days" of "amateurish space fiction of the-little-green-men variety". Baird Searles, who watched "Dragon's Domain" as episode 2, criticised dialogue stating that the Moon had entered intergalactic space, finding it incredible that the characters could have left the Milky Way. He also commented that the use of flashback early in the series suggested "a poverty of invention" on the part of the writers.

Later reviews considered the episode to be one of Space: 1999's best. SFX magazine rated it "A-plus", calling the flashbacks "extremely effective" and the monster "superbly nightmarish". SciFiNow gave it 4 out of 5, describing it as a "real standout" because of its "unusual structure" and "great character study".

A retrospective by Nerdist named "Dragon's Domain" the best episode of the series. A 1992 issue of TV Zone magazine expressed the same view, describing it as "the episode everyone remembers [...] [T]his is perhaps the only occasion the series got absolutely everything right, and it's one to savour." A 2004 issue rated it the best episode of Year One, commenting: "[...] 'Dragon's Domain' scores for one simple reason – it scares you rigid." As well as the horror and Crichton's "dark direction", the magazine praised the episode's "solid drama" and the performances of Garko and Landau. Dreamwatch Bulletin argued that the episode was improved by making a guest Alphan character, rather than Koenig, the focus of the story.

Ian Berriman of SFX characterised the episode as "full-on horror" with a "Lovecraftian abomination at its heart." Journalist and Space: 1999 fan Shaqui Le Vesconte called the alien creature "genuinely the stuff of nightmares." Jay Allen Sanford was critical of the creature, writing that he was "completely unimpressed by the rubber Japanese-porn tentacle monster with a conveyor belt going in and out of its mouth". Of the Ultra Probe scenes, he argued that Lost in Space gave a better take on the idea of a "spaceship junkyard".

John Kenneth Muir wrote that in addition to George and the Dragon, the portrayal of Cellini's quest to destroy the monster evokes Homer's Odyssey, the 19th-century novels Moby-Dick and Twenty Thousand Leagues Under the Seas, and the science fiction horror film It! The Terror from Beyond Space (1958). He also argued that the episode "feels like a direct precursor" to the science fiction horror film Alien (1979) and its sequel, Aliens (1986).

== Adaptations ==
The episode was adapted in the sixth Year One Space: 1999 novel Astral Quest by John Rankine, published in 1975. In the novel, the characters Tony Cellini and Monique Bouchere retain their original names Jim Calder and Olga Vishenskaya.

In the Italian AMZ comic counterpart of the episode (titled "Nel regno del mostro", literally translated "Into the Monster's kingdom"), the moon arrives in an unidentified system of the Ultra galaxy and Koenig sends the Ultra Probe to explore the system.
