= Guardian of Piri =

- Space: 1999 episode
- Episode no.: Series 1 Episode 19
- Directed by: Charles Crichton
- Written by: Christopher Penfold (uncredited)
- Story by: David Weir (uncredited)
- Cinematography by: Frank Watts
- Editing by: Derek Hyde Chambers
- Production code: SP 8
- Original air date: 15 September 1975
- Running time: 50 minutes

Guest appearances
- Catherine Schell as the Servant; Michael Culver as Pete Irving; John Gleeson as Ed Davis; Gareth Hunt as Eagle pilot; John Lee-Barber as Eagle co-pilot; Anne Hanson as Sarah Graham; Barbara Kelly as the voice of Computer

Episode chronology
← Previous "Force of Life"	Next → "Missing Link"

"Guardian of Piri" is the 19th episode of the first series of Space: 1999, a 1970s British science fiction television series produced by Group Three for ITC Entertainment. Written by Christopher Penfold from a story by David Weir, and directed by Charles Crichton, it was the eighth episode to be made and was filmed at Pinewood Studios in May 1974.

Opening in 1999, the series follows the crew of Earth's lunar colony Moonbase Alpha after a massive nuclear explosion pushes the Moon out of the Solar System, leaving it drifting through interstellar space. Unable to control the new rogue planet's course or speed, the Alphans encounter various astronomical phenomena and alien civilisations and as they search for a way back to Earth or a new world to colonise. In "Guardian of Piri", an alien intelligence brainwashes all the Alphans except Moonbase commander John Koenig into thinking that the dead planet Piri will make an ideal new home.

"Guardian of Piri" marks the Space: 1999 debut of Catherine Schell, who returned as the regular character Maya in Series 2. The episode first aired on 15 September 1975 in Australia. It had mixed reviews from critics but received praise for its production design.

== Plot ==
The Moon is passing a planet of unknown habitability. Scans by Alpha's Computer fail to return any meaningful data. Monitoring an Eagle survey mission, Captain Carter warns the pilots to slow their atmospheric entry, but they are unconcerned because Computer is telling them all is well. Contact is lost and the Eagle disappears, presumed destroyed.

Commander Koenig wonders whether the loss of the Eagle was due to Computer or pilot error. Carter takes off in another Eagle. Entering the atmosphere, he finds the first Eagle suspended in mid-air with no sign of the pilots or any native life. He returns to Alpha.

Professor Bergman collapses and is taken to Medical. His artificial heart has given out because Computer has silently reduced the level of oxygen in the air supply. On waking, Bergman says the planet is just right for the Alphans. Computer's ongoing malfunctions interrupt a blood transfusion to patient Sarah Graham, killing her. David Kano agrees to use his brain implant to interface with Computer and diagnose the fault. However, on making the connection, he vanishes.

Bergman confirms the planet is habitable and the Moon has entered orbit. Landing with Carter, Koenig encounters Kano and the pilots, who are in a trance. Kano says Computer was right and this planet, Piri, is "perfect" for the Alphans.

A woman appears, calling herself "the Servant of the Guardian". They captured the drifting Moon so the Alphans could come to Piri and be free of their fears and doubts. Millennia ago, the planet was inhabited by the technologically advanced Pirians. Devoting themselves to pleasure, they built machines to run the planet and left all decision-making to the Guardian, who stopped time so their perfect existence would last for ever. Now the Alphans have accepted the "offer of happiness": time has stopped for them.

On the way home, Carter comments on the pleasantness of Piri and begins flying erratically. Koenig overpowers Carter and lands at Alpha, only to find everyone has taken leave of their senses, toasting "a new world" and preparing to settle on Piri. He is unable to convince them of the truth: the Guardian has corrupted Computer and the bliss of Piri is an illusion. All except Koenig depart for Piri.

Eventually, Koenig takes Alpha's last Eagle down to the planet. The dazed Alphans babble about their newfound happiness. Koenig uses a medical device to bring Russell around. Her last memory is of the Eagles entering a portal of light; she does not recall seeing the Pirians or any machines. Koenig deduces that the portal is the Guardian and the Servant lied.

The Servant tells the other Alphans Koenig threatens their peace and must be destroyed. The Alphans pursue Koenig and Russell to the portal, where a firefight ensues. Announcing that the Pirians' surrender to technology is what killed them, Koenig shoots the Servant, revealing her to be a machine. The Guardian explodes.

Now themselves again, the Alphans return to the Moon, which has left orbit. Russell theorises that the Guardian and the Servant were the same entity, so when Koenig destroyed the Servant, the Guardian's grip on the Moon, as well as time itself, was released. Sensors show that life has returned to Piri.

== Regular cast ==
- Martin Landau as Commander John Koenig
- Barbara Bain as Dr Helena Russell
- Barry Morse as Professor Victor Bergman
- Prentis Hancock as Controller Paul Morrow
- Clifton Jones as David Kano
- Zienia Merton as Sandra Benes
- Anton Phillips as Dr Bob Mathias
- Nick Tate as Captain Alan Carter
- Suzanne Roquette as Tanya Alexander

== Production ==
The script was written by Christopher Penfold from a story by David Weir titled "Nobody's Perfect", which was based on the tale of the Lotophagi in Homer's Odyssey. Weir's treatment included scenes of Koenig taking Alphans hostage in a futile effort to stop the others leaving for Piri. It also featured a different ending: as drafted, Koenig makes the Guardian see that its actions have brought about a dead planet, and the entity destroys itself. Neither Weir nor Penfold is credited in the finished episode.

The episode was filmed between 7 and 24 May 1974 and completed that August.

Guest star Gareth Hunt was originally cast as Irving. On the first day of filming, he had a disagreement with the director and quit the production. Michael Culver was then cast in Hunt's role, while John Gleeson replaced John Lee-Barber as Davis. Footage of Hunt and Lee-Barber was retained in the finished episode, which presents the pair as unnamed Eagle pilots.

On her interpretation of the Servant, Catherine Schell remembered "[deciding] to do something a bit eerie with it, so I chose to do it on one level only [...] There were no deep emotions, no spontaneity, nothing below the surface. She was programmed to be alluring and friendly, but there was no real warmth to her." Schell was later cast as the shapeshifting regular character Maya in Space: 1999's second series.

The vibrant set designs for the surface of Piri were coolly received by series producer Gerry Anderson, who thought them outlandish. He was reassured, however, when the technicians at Group Three's film laboratory praised "Guardian of Piri" as Space: 1999's "best episode so far". A shot of the Pirian landscape was later used in Doctor Who's Nightmare of Eden (1979) to represent the surface of the planet Ranx.

The scenes on Piri are accompanied by the incidental musical piece Undersea, a Chappell & Co. library composition by Chuck Cassey which was recorded by John Cacavas And His Music.

== Broadcast and reception ==
The episode was first broadcast on 15 September 1975 in Australia and 13 November 1975 in the UK.

SFX magazine gave "Guardian of Piri" an "A" grade, calling the planet design "a masterpiece of the bizarre" and the resolution "exciting". TV Zone magazine found the plot "not desperately original" but praised the production design. It compared the story to Star Trek's "This Side of Paradise". SciFiNow gave the episode 3 out of 5. The Blackpool Gazette characterised it as "fabulous-looking nonsense about brainwashing".

Dreamwatch Bulletin gave the episode 3 out of 10, conceding that it was memorable but still believing it to represent "the nadir of the [first] season". It described the direction as "uninspired" and the story "childish" in its simplicity, arguing that "the most interesting thing [...] is that the scenes set on Piri are reminiscent of Barbarella." Video Watchdog commented that while the episode features some "eye-catching" design, the writing is "woefully simplistic".

John Kenneth Muir called the episode "good, if not terribly original", arguing that the climax of the story (Koenig shoots the Guardian) is too straightforward. Writing that the episode is helped by its "wonderful production values", he praised the design of Piri, describing it as "without a doubt, the most unusual and interesting" of the one-off planets in Space: 1999. He also commented favourably on Schell's performance, believing the Servant to be one of the series' standout villains. He compared the allure of Piri to that of the Sirens in the Odyssey, noting that the Guardian issues a "futuristic Siren call" while the planet offers "a computerised version of paradise". He viewed the story as a moral tale on the "dehumanising influence" of automation, complicated by its suggestion of "a continuum in terms of dependence on technology" – with the Alphans, who are reliant on Computer, "[representing] an early-but-still-dangerous point on that particular graph."
