= List of Space: 1999 episodes =

Space: 1999, a British science fiction television series, ran for 48 episodes from 1975 to 1977. The first series of 24 episodes (often referred to as "Year One") premiered in Australia on 16 May 1975. In the UK, the various ITV franchises showed the episodes in different orders. The tables below list the episodes in the viewing order recommended by distributor ITC.

== Series 1 (1975–1976) ==
=== Episodes ===
No. overall	No. in series	Title	Directed by	Written by	Originally aired by / in	Original air date	Prod. code
1	1	"Breakaway"	Lee H. Katzin	George Bellak	CTC7, Australia	16 May 1975	SP 1
In September 1999, John Koenig reports to Earth's Space Research Center at Moonbase Alpha as its new commander. A strange sickness is killing some of the Moonbase Alpha crew. Commander Koenig's investigation reveals that the source lies at Nuclear Waste Disposal Area 1 caused by excessive magnetic energy fields. The continuous buildup of energy shortly causes massive explosion clusters that knock the moon off orbit into deep space.
2	2	"Matter of Life and Death"	Charles Crichton	Art Wallace & Johnny Byrne	ATV, UK	27 November 1975	SP 2
A lush Earth-type planet holds the promise of a new home for the people of Moonbase Alpha. When the reconnaissance Eagle returns, it carries an unexpected passenger: Helena's husband, who died five years ago. The mysterious Lee Russell tells the Alphans that death awaits them on the new planet. The Alphans ignore his warning and unknowingly descend into a world of antimatter.
3	3	"The Infernal Machine"	David Tomblin	Anthony Terpiloff & Elizabeth Barrows	ATV, UK	8 January 1976	SP 21
The Alphans are visited by a bizarre spacecraft, whose request for supplies hides a deeper purpose. The ship, Gwent, is found to be sentient, the attempt of a vain alien genius to live forever. Powerful, unstable and craving companionship, Gwent intends for Koenig, Helena and Bergman to replace its aged, dying creator.
4	4	"Dragon's Domain"	Charles Crichton	Christopher Penfold	KRON-TV, United States	13 September 1975	SP 23
In 1996, Tony Cellini commanded a high-profile space mission which ended in disaster. The sole survivor, he told an outrageous tale of a spaceship graveyard and an alien 'dragon' which devoured his crew. Believed by no one, he was left a broken man. Five years later, the truth is revealed when the runaway Moon approaches the same deadly Sargasso in space.
5	5	"The Testament of Arkadia"	David Tomblin	Johnny Byrne	United States	2 December 1975	SP 24
The wandering Moon suddenly changes course and comes to a halt in the vicinity of a dead world. As Alpha's power fails, the only hope for survival is to evacuate to the planet, which was ravaged by a nuclear war in the distant past. Searching for answers, a team is sent to the surface, where they discover the shocking truth of the origin of the human species.
6	6	"The Last Enemy"	Bob Kellett	Bob Kellett	United States	9 December 1975	SP 18
The Moon approaches a solar system with two planets on opposite sides of its sun. The Alphans are trapped in an interplanetary conflict when warships from both worlds trespass on the Moon to fire missiles at their opponents' planets. After taking in a refugee from a destroyed gunship, the Alphans discover they have drifted into the middle of a literal war of the sexes.
7	7	"Mission of the Darians"	Ray Austin	Johnny Byrne	ATV & Yorkshire, UK	30 October 1975	SP 22
Encountering a derelict spaceship, the Alphans respond to an automated distress signal. On board, they discover what remains of the once-great civilisation of Daria: an elite group which maintains control of the ship and a tribe which has descended into savagery. The Alphans are appalled when they discover what measures the Darians have taken to survive.
8	8	"The Troubled Spirit"	Ray Austin	Johnny Byrne	Yorkshire, UK	27 December 1975	SP 19
Dan Mateo, hoping to unlock the secret of communication with plants, unleashes a killing force from the depths of his own mind. This macabre spectre seeks vengeance for Mateo's horrible death—which has not yet occurred. Bridging the span between science and the supernatural, the Alphans hope to break the cycle and exorcise the ghost without killing the man.
9	9	"Space Brain"	Charles Crichton	Christopher Penfold	Anglia, UK	16 January 1976	SP 20
An Eagle and its crew are crushed to death by an enormous energy field in space. When one of Alpha's astronauts is possessed by the anomaly, he tells them the energy field is a living space brain, which responded to the 'threat' with antibodies. Finding the Moon on a collision course with the Brain, the Alphans make plans to avoid the same fate as the Eagle.
10	10	"War Games"	Charles Crichton	Christopher Penfold	ATV & Yorkshire, UK	25 September 1975	SP 17
Approaching an inhabited planet, the Alphans are suddenly pounced upon by warships. In an unprovoked attack, Moonbase Alpha destroyed three Earth-style Hawk fighters. The aliens retaliated. With 128 dead and Alpha unable to sustain life, Koenig and Helena appeal to the aliens for mercy. The aliens proclaim the Alphans to be an invading virus, with no right to exist.
11	11	"End of Eternity"	Ray Austin	Johnny Byrne	United States	15 November 1975	SP 16
While exploring an asteroid, the Alphans injure an alien trapped within: the indestructible Balor, a scientist whose people discovered the secret of immortality, then descended into malaise brought about by widespread deathlessness. He was imprisoned inside the asteroid and cast out. Now freed, Balor plans to spend eternity practising the art of pain and torture, with the Alphans as his subjects.
12	12	"The Full Circle"	Bob Kellett	Jesse L. Lasky Jr. & Pat Silver	Australia	29 September 1975	SP 15
When exploring a habitable planet, members of the Alphan survey party vanish without a trace. Are they the victims of an indigenous tribe of Stone Age humanoids? The mystery deepens when a dead caveman is found to have capped teeth. Others soon notice the primitive cave chief and his mate bear an uncanny resemblance to the missing John Koenig and Helena Russell.
13	13	"Death's Other Dominion"	Charles Crichton	Anthony Terpiloff & Elizabeth Barrows	Australia	11 August 1975	SP 14
On a frozen planet called Ultima Thule, the Alphans encounter shipwrecked humans from a lost expedition. The expatriates from Earth enjoy an idyllic existence: they have been made immortal and have lived there for over 880 years. They invite the Alphans to join them in paradise, but dissidents reveal that all is not as it seems, teaching Koenig that immortality comes with a price.
14	14	"Collision Course"	Ray Austin	Anthony Terpiloff	Australia	4 August 1975	SP 13
The Moon is on a collision course with an enormous planet. On a scouting mission, Koenig encounters Arra, the Queen of Atheria. The aged monarch proclaims the collision is a preordained event and must occur for her people to evolve to a higher plane of existence. Now Koenig must convince his crew to have faith and do nothing in the face of apparent destruction.
15	15	"Voyager's Return"	Bob Kellett	Johnny Byrne	Australia	1 September 1975	SP 12
The automated Earth space probe Voyager One is approaching the Moon. With the radioactive exhaust from its engine certain to extinguish all life on Moonbase, the Alphans try to gain control and shut down the drive. Help comes when the probe's designer is found living on Alpha under an assumed name. However, Voyager is being followed by alien ships seeking revenge.
16	16	"Alpha Child"	Ray Austin	Christopher Penfold	United States	11 October 1975	SP 10
The Alphans celebrate the arrival of the first child born on the Moon. The blessed event sours when the infant grows into a five-year-old child in minutes. Trying to accept him, the Alphans do not notice that little Jackie Crawford is much more than he seems. When hostile spaceships approach the base, Koenig realises, too late, that the aliens have an agent on Alpha.
17	17	"The Last Sunset"	Charles Crichton	Christopher Penfold	Australia	8 December 1975	SP 11
Anonymous alien benefactors provide the wandering Moon with a breathable atmosphere. The Alphans rejoice as they realise they have a wonderful new home in their own backyard. Preparations are made to settle and begin building a new civilisation on the Moon's surface. Koenig is suspicious of the aliens' motives, wondering how long this generous gift will last.
18	18	"Force of Life"	David Tomblin	Johnny Byrne	Australia	18 August 1975	SP 9
The body of Anton Zoref (Ian McShane) is invaded by an unknown life force. The man soon manifests an uncontrollable ability to absorb energy. As the Alphans struggle to understand this mysterious force, Zoref's need becomes insatiable. Driven by instinct, he makes his way to the greatest source of energy on Alpha: the Nuclear Generating Plant.
19	19	"Guardian of Piri"	Charles Crichton	Christopher Penfold	Australia	15 September 1975	SP 8
Strange events befuddle the Alphans as they approach the planet Piri. When exploring its lifeless surface, Koenig encounters the seductive servant of the mysterious Guardian of Piri. She offers the wayward Alphans a life of peace and perfection. Realising the deadly truth behind the peace of Piri, Koenig struggles to free his people from the Guardian's influence.
20	20	"Missing Link"	Ray Austin	Edward di Lorenzo	Australia	3 November 1975	SP 7
John Koenig finds himself trapped on the planet Zenno, in the home of an alien scientist and his daughter. Advanced two million years beyond Earth's people, the aliens consider Koenig their missing link. Faced with the threat of being treated like an experimental animal for the rest of his life, Koenig uses an unexpected weapon to confound his captor: love.
21	21	"Another Time, Another Place"	David Tomblin	Johnny Byrne	United States	23 September 1975	SP 6
After an encounter with a space-time anomaly, the Alphans find their Moon back in the Solar System on a course to re-enter Earth orbit. The celebration ends when it becomes apparent Earth is an inhospitable wasteland. The mystery deepens when they discover a duplicate Moon already in orbit and a duplicate Moonbase Alpha lying empty and deserted.
22	22	"Earthbound"	Charles Crichton	Anthony Terpiloff	Australia	25 August 1975	SP 5
An alien spacecraft crashlands on the Moon, its passengers refugees from a dying world. As their destination is Earth, they generously offer to take one person with them when they depart. The scheming Commissioner Simmonds takes steps to ensure that he is the lucky individual chosen, even if it means destroying Alpha.
23	23	"Ring Around the Moon"	Ray Austin	Edward di Lorenzo	Australia	22 September 1975	SP 4
A technician falls under an alien influence, accessing classified information before mysteriously dying. Soon after, the Moon is stopped in space by the powerful rays of an alien spacecraft. The aliens' only interest in Alpha is the data held in its computers, information they now plan to obtain through the possessed eyes of their next agent: Dr Russell.
24	24	"Black Sun"	Lee H. Katzin	David Weir	ATV & Yorkshire, UK	6 November 1975	SP 3
The travelling Moon drifts within range of a black sun. Pulled toward certain destruction by its inescapable gravitational force, the Alphans employ desperate measures to stay alive. As a lifeboat Eagle carries six persons to safety, the Moon plunges into the black sun, with only an experimental forcefield protecting Alpha.

=== Notes ===
- The description for "Black Sun" is modified from the original ITC summary, which states that the Moon is on collision course with an asteroid that turns into a black sun. In the episode, an asteroid changes course and is destroyed by what the Alphans discover to be a "black sun" or black hole.

== Series 2 (1976–1977) ==
=== Episodes ===
No. overall	No. in series	Title	Directed by	Written by	Originally aired by	Original air date	Prod. code
25	1	"The Metamorph"	Charles Crichton	Johnny Byrne	ATV & LWT (UK); KRON-TV (US)	4 September 1976	SPII 1
The Alphans fall into the grasp of the despotic Mentor, an alien scientist trying to restore his ravaged world to its former glory. His biological computer requires the energy obtained from living brains to complete his task. When captured, Koenig is offered a choice: surrender the Alphans to a horrifying living death or face complete annihilation. Mentor's daughter Maya, who is a metamorph and from whom Mentor has concealed his actions, may be able to aid the Alphans.
26	2	"The Exiles"	Ray Austin	Donald James	ATV & LWT (UK); KRON-TV (US)	11 September 1976	SPII 2
A fleet of alien missiles takes up orbit around the Moon. When one is brought down for examination, the Alphans discover it contains the frozen body of a young man. Revived, he begs for Koenig to recover the rest of his people, innocent victims of a ruthless alien coup. The Alphans are soon reminded that appearances can be deceptive.
27	3	"Journey to Where"	Tom Clegg	Donald James	ATV & LWT (UK); KRON-TV (US)	18 September 1976	SPII 5
A radio call from planet Earth to the moon gives hope of transporting the Alphans back home, until things go terribly wrong during the first crewed transport sequence.
28	4	"One Moment of Humanity"	Charles Crichton	Tony Barwick	ATV & LWT, UK	25 September 1976	SPII 3
Zamara, an alien woman, materialises aboard Moonbase and insists that two crew members must come to her planet, Vega, while the moon passes through Vega's space. The two, Tony and Helena, find they are being provoked and it is humanoid versus androids on Vega. Guest-starring Billie Whitelaw and Leigh Lawson.
29	5	"All That Glisters"	Ray Austin	Keith Miles	ATV, UK	28 October 1976	SPII 4
Seeking a mineral, Koenig and his expedition team are trapped on a desert planet whose dominant life form is a rock that is thirsty for liquid water.
30	6	"The Mark of Archanon"	Charles Crichton	Lew Schwarz	KRON-TV, United States	9 October 1976	SPII 8
Searching in the Moon's Catacombs for minerals, Alan Carter and his assistant come across a buried cryogenic pod containing a man and a boy.
31	7	"The Taybor"	Bob Brooks	Thom Keyes	KRON-TV, United States	25 September 1976	SPII 6
A roving trader known as Taybor offers to trade the Alphans the technology to return to Earth, with Maya's companionship as the price.
32	8	"Brian the Brain"	Kevin Connor	Jack Ronder	ATV & LWT, UK	2 October 1976	SPII 9
Guest-starring Bernard Cribbins in two roles. With the moon's trajectory reported to be shifting due to an unknown cause, the Alphans happen across a roving spaceship run entirely by a computer. Brian the Brain, as he prefers to be called (voice by Bernard Cribbins), proves to be a devious device until the truth is uncovered.
33	9	"The Rules of Luton"	Val Guest	Fred Freiberger	KRON-TV, United States	16 October 1976	SPII 7
Following the detection of a defect in an Eagle, Tony Verdeschi leaves John Koenig and Maya on a prospective home planet for the Alphans, while he returns to fetch another Eagle. After picking a flower and eating a berry, John and Maya are accused of murder by the ruling plant life on Luton. Their sentence is a fight to the death with three other accused aliens. John tells Maya that his wife died in a (presumed) Third World War on Earth.
34	10	"New Adam New Eve"	Charles Crichton	Terence Feely	KRON-TV, United States	2 October 1976	SPII 10
A man appears claiming to be God and proceeds to select two couples from the Alphans to populate a new earth.
35	11	"Seed of Destruction"	Kevin Connor	John Goldsmith	ATV, UK	11 November 1976	SPII 13
While exploring a bizarre asteroid, Koenig is detained and replaced by a double which directs Alpha to direct most of its energy at the asteroid. Some of the crew react negatively at his double's dictatorial behaviour.
36	12	"The AB Chrysalis"	Val Guest	Tony Barwick	KRON-TV, United States	6 November 1976	SPII 12
Koenig, Carter and Maya investigate the source of destructive waves, occurring at regular intervals, which could destroy Moonbase Alpha; they encounter an unusual civilisation.
37	13	"Catacombs of the Moon"	Robert Lynn	Anthony Terpiloff	KRON-TV, United States	13 November 1976	SPII 11
In the catacombs of the Moon, engineer Patrick Osgood is searching for tiranium for a new heart to save his wife's life but he is developing a psychiatric disorder in his desperation and on account of dreams. The Moon is being bombarded by mysterious heat rays.
38	14	"Space Warp"	Peter Medak	Fred Freiberger	ATV, UK	2 December 1976	SPII 15
While Koenig and Tony investigate a derelict spaceship, the Moon passes through a space warp; at the same time, Maya is stricken by a fever and loses metamorphic control, becoming beasts the Alphans cannot manage, while they wait and hope Koenig and Tony will find their way to the space warp to rejoin them.
39	15	"A Matter of Balance"	Charles Crichton	Pip and Jane Baker	ATV, UK	9 December 1976	SPII 16
Botanist Shermeen is part of a reconnaissance team exploring a new planet but she is under a mysterious spell, being spoken to by a spectral man named Vindrus who has recruited Shermeen to help with a yearned-for escape plan.
40	16	"The Beta Cloud"	Robert Lynn	Fred Freiberger	ATV, UK	16 December 1976	SPII 14
A cloud of space dust causes a mystery illness on Alpha; an Eagle crew is sent to discover its secrets, but the craft returns only with a strange beast that withstands all assaults and which Maya realises is not a life form. The senders of the beast want elements of Alpha's life support system.
41	17	"The Lambda Factor"	Charles Crichton	Terrance Dicks	ATV, UK	23 December 1976	SPII 19
Maya discovers that a huge gaseous cloud is giving off Lambda waves which could give some people paranormal powers. One of the affected Alphans cracks and begins to take control. Koenig faces spectres, two people he condemned to death many years earlier during an expedition to a space station orbiting Venus.
42	18	"The Bringers of Wonder, Parts 1 and 2"	Tom Clegg	Terence Feely	KRON-TV, United States	19 February 1977	SPII 17
43	19	"The Bringers of Wonder, Parts 1 and 2"	Tom Clegg	Terence Feely	KRON-TV, United States	26 February 1977	SPII 18
Koenig goes berserk while flying an Eagle; as he is in Medical Center unconscious, a Superswift lands and its crew is revealed as a team of people from Earth come to take the Alphans home. When Koenig seems to recover after some wave therapy applied to his brain, he does not see the old friends and acquaintances everyone else sees, nor a Superswift; instead, he sees hideous telepathic aliens and an unknown spacecraft. Koenig convinces Helena to doubt the credibility of the visitors and treat Maya the same way he was treated. Maya can confirm Koenig's perception of aliens, and after treating nearly everyone, Koenig, Maya and Tony work to stop the aliens, whose real intent is to detonate nuclear fuel to provide their sustenance.
44	20	"The Seance Spectre"	Peter Medak	Donald James	KRON-TV, United States	5 March 1977	SPII 20
The leader of a surface survey team, Sanderson, all suffering from a mental disorder brought on from the monotonous lunar terrain, suspects Koenig of concealing discovery of a habitable planet. He incites his team to help him take over the Command Center from Koenig, intent on inhabiting the new planet named Tora that is on a collision course with the moon.
45	21	"Dorzak"	Val Guest	Christopher Penfold	KRON-TV, United States	12 March 1977	SPII 21
An alien ship lands seeking aid, but when its commander emerges and sees Maya, she stuns Maya, putting her in stasis. The ship bears Dorzak, a Psychon refugee who behaved criminally on the commander's planet. Dorzak beguiles Maya about his intent, using extremely well-developed psychic abilities to control others' thoughts.
46	22	"Devil's Planet"	Tom Clegg	Michael Winder	KRON-TV, United States	26 March 1977	SPII 22
Koenig and a colleague land on an Earth-like planet, once populated but now devoid of life. They flee when a man steps from a transport booth and dies. They fly the Eagle to the planet's companion body and crash. The colleague is killed by a forcefield and Koenig is captured. Taken to a penal colony on the planet's moon, he becomes the person of interest to the warden who then conceals Koenig's survival when other Alphans arrive in search of the Eagle crew.
47	23	"The Immunity Syndrome"	Bob Brooks	Johnny Byrne	KRON-TV, United States	19 March 1977	SPII 23
While on a survey of a planet to replenish food and water on Moonbase Alpha, an alien form attacks a crewman who seemingly goes mad; after a brief struggle with the crewman, Tony Verdeschi is attacked by the alien as well. Koenig and the survey party must find Tony and help him regain his senses before the madness kills him and solve the mystery of the alien life form. All their technology breaks down, preventing them from leaving or receiving aid; all food – native and their own supply – become toxic.
48	24	"The Dorcons"	Tom Clegg	Johnny Byrne	KRON-TV, United States	2 April 1977	SPII 24
Alpha is approached by an alien vessel, which Maya recognises as a Dorcon ship. The Dorcons are enemies of the Psychons. The Dorcon ship takes Maya from Moonbase Alpha so that the ship's commander can harvest Maya's brain stem to provide immortality to the supreme ruler. An attempt by Koenig to free Maya ensues. But the immature, scheming heir has other plans.

=== Notes ===
- The Year Two episodes aired on Associated Television over the course of more than a year. In some regions of the UK, the final episode, "The Dorcons", did not air until the summer of 1978. In others, it did not appear until the 1998 BBC Two repeat run.
- Star Trek also has an episode titled "The Immunity Syndrome".
