= Force of Life =

- Space: 1999 episode
- Episode no.: Series 1 Episode 18
- Directed by: David Tomblin
- Written by: Johnny Byrne
- Editing by: Alan Killick
- Production code: SP 9
- Original air date: 18 August 1975

Guest appearances
- Ian McShane as Anton Zoref; Gay Hamilton as Eva Zoref; John Hamill as Mark Dominix; Eva Rueber-Staier as Jane; Lea Dregorn as Hilary Preston; Tony Allyn as Security Guard; Sarah Bullen as Kate; Barbara Kelly as Computer Voice

Episode chronology
← Previous "The Last Sunset"	Next → "Guardian of Piri"

"Force of Life" is the 18th episode of the first series of Space: 1999. The screenplay was written by Johnny Byrne; the director was David Tomblin. The original title was "Force of Evil". The shooting script is dated 15 May 1974; the final shooting script is dated 24 May 1974. Live-action filming began Wednesday 29 May 1974 through Friday 7 June 1974. After a three-week hiatus, filming resumed Monday 1 July 1974 through Friday 5 July 1974; the hiatus was planned, as the Landaus' contract guaranteed them time off for a summer holiday.

The episode first aired in Australia on 18 August 1975. In the UK, it was first broadcast on 11 September 1975.

== Plot ==
A sphere of blue light approaches the Moon and immobilises everyone on Alpha except Anton Zoref, a technician in one of the nuclear power plants. It enters Zoref's body, knocking him unconscious. The other personnel are re-animated and the light disappears. On waking, Zoref is shaken by his experience, but Dr Russell finds nothing physically wrong with him and releases him into the care of his wife, Eva. Reviewing computer logs, Professor Bergman discovers there was a large energy discharge in the power plant around the time the base was attacked.

Unknown to those around him, Zoref is transforming into an entity with an insatiable need for thermal energy. Lights go out as he walks by, and anyone touching him suffers total loss of body heat, freezing to death in seconds. Each incident registers on sensors as an unexplained energy discharge. Driven by instinct, Zoref kills and drains the energy from fellow technician Mark Dominix and Medical orderly Hilary Preston. He then enters Alpha's solarium and starts glowing purple while basking in the light and warmth of the sunbeds. Commander Koenig arrives with a security team and shoots the solarium's power generator, extinguishing all nearby sources of thermal energy and neutralising Zoref.

Unconscious, Zoref is taken to Medical and placed in an observation room containing a single, weak light source. However, this is enough to restore his strength. He breaks out of Medical, freezing a security guard in the process, and heads back to the nuclear plant. Declaring a base-wide emergency, Koenig orders personnel to avoid Zoref if possible, but shoot to kill if they must. Reasoning that the only way to destroy the alien force is to starve it of energy, he cuts power to all sectors – including Medical, which has several patients under critical care.

Eva finds Zoref and begs him to surrender. Despite being weakened by the low light, Zoref remains dangerous and is about to freeze Eva until Captain Carter appears and drags her away. Koenig, Carter and Bergman confront Zoref at the doors to the nuclear plant. Zoref moves to attack Koenig, forcing Carter to shoot him with his laser sidearm. Zoref's whole body is burned, but the energy from the blast is enough to revitalise him. As Koenig and the others clear the area, he proceeds into the plant, unseals the nuclear reactor, and steps inside.

The plant explodes. Above the ruins, the blue light reappears and then heads out into space. Alpha's power is restored with no loss of life reported by Medical. Koenig wonders what drove the alien force; Bergman theorises they may have witnessed a form of evolution, or even a "birth". Russell comforts Eva as the two of them watch the blue light fade into the distance.

== Regular cast ==
- Martin Landau as Commander John Koenig
- Barbara Bain as Dr Helena Russell
- Barry Morse as Professor Victor Bergman
- Prentis Hancock as Controller Paul Morrow
- Clifton Jones as David Kano
- Zienia Merton as Sandra Benes
- Anton Phillips as Dr Bob Mathias
- Nick Tate as Captain Alan Carter
- Suzanne Roquette as Tanya Alexander (uncredited)

== Production ==
Johnny Byrne recalled that the original story idea featured a malevolent alien force, hence the episode's working title: "Force of Evil". During a story conference with executive producer Gerry Anderson, Byrne re-thought the concept, and the two agreed that the entity should instead be following an evolutionary imperative unconnected to human emotion or understanding. In a 1994 interview, Byrne described the alien force as "a being going through a galactic transformation. It has no function other than to change from the 'caterpillar' into the 'butterfly', and the things it meets along the way become agents of that change." To emphasise the truly alien aspect of the life-force, Bryne set the action against the very human domestic life of Anton and Eva Zoref. ITC executives insisted Byrne add the sequence where Koenig and Bergman speculate the entity's evolutionary cycle might be that of a developing star, hoping to provide some explanation for its actions.

Byrne attributed the episode's success to the directorial style of David Tomblin. Tomblin would employ a number of unusual camera angles and lens techniques to enhance the eerie quality inherent in the tale. After completing "Force of Life", Tomblin (one of three directors employed by the series on a rotating basis along with Ray Austin and Charles Crichton), would take a sabbatical from Space: 1999 to serve as assistant director for the feature film Barry Lyndon. He would be replaced for three instalments by director Bob Kellett.

=== Music ===
To highlight the utterly alien nature of the unknown life-force, the regular Barry Gray score was replaced by abstract electronic compositions drawn from the music library. Those featured were 'Cosmic Sounds No. 1', 'Cosmic Sounds No. 2' and 'Cosmic Sounds No. 3' by Georges Teperino and 'Videotronic No. 3' by Cecil Leuter. Another synthesised music track, 'The Latest Fashion' by Giampiero Boneschi, was used as the piped music heard throughout the Solarium scenes.

== Reception ==
When "Force of Life" first aired in the Midlands, a reviewer for the Birmingham Daily Post criticised the episode's horror content, believing it to be excessive and harmful to children. The episode was also taken to task by critics who accused Space: 1999 of being poorly plotted or deliberately enigmatic. John Brosnan found the story and its presentation clichéd, adding that "it could have been any episode of Star Trek, albeit a rather lavish one". According to James Van Hise, "Force of Life" is symptomatic of "a nagging tradition on the show, that being scripts which are not thought-out enough to provide answers to questions which they raise. We never really did find out what the 'force of life' in the title was, or what it accomplished." He wrote that episode exemplifies Space: 1999's "storytelling deficiencies". While appearing on an American news programme, Martin Landau was confronted by a fellow guest Buster Crabbe (star of the Flash Gordon and Buck Rogers serials). Having watched "Force of Life" and not understood the story, Crabbe asked Landau to explain what the alien force represented; Landau said that he had no idea.

Retrospective reviews have been positive. SFX magazine gave the episode an "A minus" rating, calling it "unsettling and distinctly eerie". SciFiNow rated the episode three out of five, while commentator James O'Neill found it average, describing it as "another Outer Limits-style" story. One review in DreamWatch Bulletin awarded the episode nine out of ten, commenting: "This story has the Tomblin feel to it: interesting camera angles, weird lighting and sweating guest stars. It's a real pity that Martin Landau and Barbara Bain had to be there to spoil it." Another review in the same publication called the episode "strangely gripping" even if it "suffers from a lack of clarity and one of those open-mouthed endings". Video Watchdog magazine found the visuals suspenseful but the story "nonsensical". It criticised a scene in which Zoref absorbs energy in Moonbase Alpha's solarium, commenting that it provided "a convenient way to work some bikini-clad girls into the show".

John Kenneth Muir compared "Force of Life" to "Cold Hands, Warm Heart", a 1964 episode of The Outer Limits in which an astronaut begins a physical transformation after coming into contact with an alien from Venus. Muir interpreted the plot of "Force of Life" as either "a futuristic analogy for demonic possession" or an updating of the tale of Midas from the Metamorphoses, comparing Zoref's freezing ability to Midas' "golden touch". (He also noted that "Zoref" is an anagram of "froze".) He described the episode as "the dividing line between those who appreciate ambiguity in their drama, and those who prefer neat little wrap-ups and attempts at explanation". He praised the "simple mystery" of the plot, arguing that it was made better by the script's choice not to explain the force's origins and motivations. Also calling the episode a "visual masterpiece", he commended its range of camera angles, use of slow motion and flipped images, and other cinematographic aspects, writing that "all these fantastic touches" make the episode "look more like a full-fledged feature film." He argued that the episode "deserves to be remembered as one of Space: 1999's, and science-fiction television's, most memorable and horrific hours."

== Novelisation ==
The episode was adapted in the third Year One Space: 1999 novel The Space Guardians by Brian Ball, published in 1975. Ball's adaptation is true to the story, but some liberties are taken: (1) Suffering from a bout of depression, Koenig has become a recluse after his experience on Zenno (as seen in "Missing Link"). He is seen convalescing in his quarters and experiencing migraine when thinking of his lost love Vana. This crisis eventually forces him out of his fugue state; (2) The approaching entity does not employ a paralysing force in the adaptation. The Alphans attempt to blast it with nuclear missiles before it joins with the unfortunate Zoref; (3) While harbouring the entity, Zoref undergoes a gradual physical transformation into a shambling, thick-skulled humanoid creature.
