= Alpha Child =

- Space: 1999 episode
- Episode no.: Series 1 Episode 16
- Directed by: Ray Austin
- Written by: Christopher Penfold
- Cinematography by: Frank Watts
- Editing by: Derek Hyde Chambers
- Production code: SP 10
- Original air date: 11 October 1975

Guest appearances
- Julian Glover as Jarak; Cyd Hayman as Sue Crawford/Rena; Wayne Brooks as Jackie Crawford; Rula Lenska as Joan Conway; Andrea Allan as Nurse Paula; Vincent Wong as Dr Fujita; Gerry Crampton and Alf Joint as Security Guards; Barbara Kelly as Voice of Moonbase Alpha's computer

Episode chronology
← Previous "Voyager's Return"	Next → "The Last Sunset"

"Alpha Child" is the 16th episode of the first series of Space: 1999, a 1970s British science fiction television series produced by Group Three for ITC Entertainment. Written by Christopher Penfold and directed by Ray Austin, it was the 10th episode to be produced and was filmed at Pinewood Studios in July 1974.

Opening in 1999, the series follows the crew of lunar colony Moonbase Alpha after a nuclear explosion pushes the Moon out of Earth orbit and into interstellar space. Unable to control the rogue planet's trajectory, the Alphans encounter various astronomical phenomena and alien civilisations as they search for a way back to Earth or a new world to settle on. In "Alpha Child", the Alphans are threatened by fugitives of an alien race who take control of the first child to be born on the Moon since it left Earth.

The episode first aired on 11 October 1975 in the United States and 16 October 1975 in the UK. It received mixed reviews from commentators.

== Plot ==
The crew of Moonbase Alpha pause work to celebrate the arrival of the first child born on the Moon since it broke away from Earth. It is the son of Sue Crawford and her husband Jack, a technician in one of Alpha's nuclear plants who died in an accident several months earlier. Unknown to the Alphans, a sphere of light is watching the Moon from space. Joy turns to astonishment when, in a matter of seconds, the newborn matures into a boy of six.

Sue's son is deaf and mute but very curious about Alpha's technology. Uncertain whether his accelerated growth was caused by their artificial environment or is the result of an external force, the Alphans name the boy Jackie and do their best to raise him. Professor Bergman and Captain Carter take a particular interest in his upbringing, with Carter becoming a father-like figure to him. Commander Koenig, however, knows there is more to Jackie than meets the eye. Sue is terrified of her child and is kept sedated in Medical.

Jackie develops a hypnotic power that enables him to control the Alphans' actions. Meanwhile, the sphere of light transforms into a spacecraft that approaches the Moon. It is soon joined by several other ships, and they all hold position over Alpha. Carter launches the Eagle squadron to defend the base, but the ships fire energy beams that render the pilots unconscious and force the Eagles to land. Jackie becomes unresponsive and is rushed to Medical, where he is found to be undergoing another rapid growth spurt. Koenig takes a team out onto the lunar surface to shoot down the invaders using high-powered laser weapons.

In Medical, Jackie is now an adult. Finding his voice, he introduces himself as Jarak, the new commander of Moonbase Alpha. Using his psychic abilities, he forces Dr Russell to call Koenig, ordering him to abort the laser attack. He murders Sue and then resurrects her as his consort, Rena. After disarming Alpha's security guards, Jarak and Rena explain their presence on the Moon. They are fugitives from a race of beings who can take over the bodies of other species at moments of birth and death. Having objected to their society's imposed genetic conformity, they are leading 120 of their kind in search of a people to hide in. The Alphans will make ideal hosts.

Combining their powers, Jarak and Rena begin choking the Alphans to death so their compatriots in the ships above can claim their new home. They are interrupted when a battlecruiser belonging to their pursuers arrives and shoots down the other craft. Having lost their psychic grip on the Alphans, Jarak and Rena barricade themselves in Medical. Jarak requests political asylum, but his radio conversation with Koenig is cut short when the cruiser projects a beam of light at Alpha. Koenig and the others break in to find Sue tearfully cradling the newborn Jackie, with no trace of Jarak and Rena. Russell supposes they surrendered, but Koenig suspects they were taken by force.

== Regular cast ==
- Martin Landau as Commander John Koenig
- Barbara Bain as Dr Helena Russell
- Barry Morse as Professor Victor Bergman
- Prentis Hancock as Controller Paul Morrow
- Clifton Jones as David Kano
- Zienia Merton as Sandra Benes
- Anton Phillips as Dr Bob Mathias
- Nick Tate as Captain Alan Carter
- Suzanne Roquette as Tanya Alexander

== Production and broadcast ==
The story idea came from Gerry Anderson, Space: 1999's executive producer, who was inspired by the science fiction novel The Midwich Cuckoos. Originally written by Edward di Lorenzo, the script was heavily revised by series story consultant Christopher Penfold. The completed episode credits Penfold as the sole writer. In di Lorenzo's script, Jackie's mother's first name was Cynthia.

"Alpha Child" was filmed at Pinewood Studios between 5 and 22 July 1974. The infant Jackie was played by six-year-old Wayne Brooks from Stanmore. According to Anderson, more than 100 boys were considered for the role. The look of the alien battlecruiser was influenced by the design of Discovery 1 in the film 2001: A Space Odyssey (1968). The cruiser model reappeared in several later episodes of Space: 1999.

The episode first aired on 11 October 1975 in the United States. In the UK, it was first shown by Associated and Yorkshire Television on 16 October 1975.

== Reception ==
"Alpha Child" drew a mixed critical response. SciFiNow magazine gave the episode 4 out of 5, calling it "a surprising and twist-laden take on the 'star child' story" and "a genuinely pleasant surprise". John Kenneth Muir commented that the shots of the overgrown infant Jackie in his baby incubator are an "unforgettable image of terror". He praised the strong lighting of Jackie/Jarak's eyes, writing that it compellingly conveys the character's burgeoning psychic powers. However, he thought the episode was let down by the reveal of Jarak: "[T]he unexpected arrival of alien ships, the distraction of the space battles, and the unnecessary metamorphosis of Jackie into a grown man, all diminish the claustrophobic atmosphere of the story."

SFX magazine graded the episode "B-minus", commenting that it becomes "a bit so-so" once Jackie reaches adulthood. Video Watchdog regarded it as "the nadir" of Space: 1999's first series, stating that the story "starts off silly, then turns excruciatingly stupid with a particularly vapid denouement." DreamWatch Bulletin gave the episode 7 out of 10, calling it "average". The magazine remarked that Glover plays Jarak "as well as can be expected in a pair of silver shorts and a wig borrowed from I, Claudius." According to TV Zone, Glover's performance "raises the unimaginative script from the mundane."

Muir compared Jackie to both Damien Thorn, the antichrist in the Omen films, and the parasitic aliens of Village of the Damned. He also noted plot similarities with Rosemary's Baby. DreamWatch Bulletin considered the premise like that of "The Child", a 1988 episode of Star Trek: The Next Generation in which Deanna Troi is impregnated by an alien force and shortly after gives birth to a son, who rapidly ages into an eight-year-old. Commentator David Scott argued that of the two episodes, "Alpha Child" provided "the better treatment" of an alien child story. Muir speculated that "Alpha Child" may have influenced the Star Trek episode, pointing out that the latter was originally devised for Star Trek: Phase II around 1976 or 1977, no more than one to two years after "Alpha Child" first aired.
