= Another Time, Another Place (Space: 1999) =

- Space: 1999 episode
- Episode no.: Series 1 Episode 21
- Directed by: David Tomblin
- Written by: Johnny Byrne
- Editing by: Derek Hyde Chambers
- Production code: SP 6
- Original air date: 23 September 1975

Guest appearances
- Judy Geeson as Regina Kesslann; Tony Allyn as Security Guard; Alan Roberto as Duplicate Morrow's Son; Claire McLellan as Duplicate Morrow's Daughter; Barbara Kelly as Computer Voice

Episode chronology
← Previous "Missing Link"	Next → "Earthbound"

"Another Time, Another Place" is the 21st episode of the first series of Space: 1999. The screenplay was written by Johnny Byrne; the director was David Tomblin. The final shooting script is dated 20 January 1974, with blue-page amendments dated 25 January and 1 April 1974. Live-action filming took place Tuesday 2 April 1974 through Friday 19 April 1974. Two days of second-unit filming took place Tuesday 23 April 1974 and Thursday 25 April 1974 during the production of "Missing Link".

The episode first aired in the United States on 23 September 1975. In the UK, it was first broadcast on 18 December 1975.

== Plot ==
The Moon is pulled into a spacetime anomaly which duplicates it, as well as Moonbase Alpha and its crew. After the Moon re-enters normal space, its duplicate speeds away and the Alphans' doubles vanish. It is discovered that the Moon is in a new region of space and approaching a planetary system.

Regina Kesslann emerges from the ordeal no longer recognising her life on Alpha. Although she has never been married, she claims that her "husband" – Alan Carter – is dead, as is Commander Koenig. Believing that the Moon has travelled faster than light, Professor Bergman ponders whether time could be affecting Kesslann's mind: she may be experiencing a past or future life.

Scans reveal that the planetary system is Earth's own Solar System and the Moon is re-entering Earth orbit. As the Alphans prepare to evacuate, believing that they are home, Kesslann has a vision of herself with an older and sadder face, which then turns into a skull. Her head wracked by pain, she dies in Carter's arms. Dr Russell's autopsy finds that Kesslann's brain was duplicated inside her head, causing fatal intracranial pressure.

Bergman discovers that a shift in Earth's tilt has caused global environmental collapse. The only remaining habitable area is Santa Maria, California. The duplicated Moon reappears, emitting Alpha's signal. Flying there an Eagle, Koenig and Carter discover a duplicated Alpha devoid of crew and equipment. Investigating a crashed Eagle, they find two dead astronauts – themselves.

The duplicated Moon is accelerating to collide with the original. Although evacuation to Santa Maria is now vital, Russell insists on limiting the first landing party to Koenig, Carter, and herself as medical officer. If any Alphans meet their doubles, they risk suffering Kesslann's fate, but Koenig and Carter are safe because their counterparts are dead.

Koenig, Russell and Carter touch down in Santa Maria and find a settlement inhabited by the ageing doubles of Russell, Bergman and others. Duplicate Kesslann has just died. Duplicate Russell states that she is about to die, but welcomes it because she will be reunited with her late husband – duplicate Koenig. She kisses Koenig and dies in his arms.

The settlers demand that the new arrivals leave. Bergman, unsure whether this is a past or future Earth, deduces that the two Alpha crews are the same people trapped in different times, and considering what happened to Kesslann and Russell it would be disastrous for any more Alphans to come to Earth. He predicts that the two Moons' collision will put things right, leaving one Moon and one set of Alphans in one time. The new arrivals must be on their Moon when the correction occurs.

Koenig, Russell and Carter return home and the Alphans await the collision. The Moons touch, creating a schism that merges them together and transports the one Moon to yet another part of the cosmos. The Alphans wonder whether their doubles survived or even existed at all. However, Russell still has a bouquet of flowers that Bergman's double picked for her.

== Regular cast ==
- Martin Landau as Commander John Koenig
- Barbara Bain as Dr Helena Russell
- Barry Morse as Professor Victor Bergman
- Prentis Hancock as Controller Paul Morrow
- Clifton Jones as David Kano
- Zienia Merton as Sandra Benes
- Anton Phillips as Dr Bob Mathias
- Nick Tate as Captain Alan Carter
- Suzanne Roquette as Tanya Alexander (uncredited)

== Production ==
"Another Time, Another Place" was Johnny Byrne's first original script for the series after his original six-week stint on the Space: 1999 production staff was extended to full-time script editor. He started with the concept of the worst thing he could imagine happening to the Alphans: hitting a 'mad cloud or particle storm in space' that causes their bodies to separate into duplicates. With that concept forming the episode's hook, he then had to conceive the next four acts of storyline to reach the conclusion of the Alphans coming face-to-face with themselves. The story would highlight the cyclic nature of human experience—the catastrophic failure of the 20th Century 'techno-man' resulting in a new beginning of the process emerging from the ashes; this idea would be featured in several of Byrne's scripts for the series.

The final shooting script contained an unfilmed scene where Koenig, Helena and Carter, making their way to the settlement, encounter the top twenty metres of the Santa Maria satellite tower sticking out of the ashy soil, thus establishing this Earth as their own after the occurrence of some great holocaust. There is also a reference to the Solar System containing eleven planets; this was changed to nine in the revised draft to make the dénouement of their being back in the Solar System more obvious to the viewer.

The 'This Episode' montage in the episode's opening credits contains an unused effects shot: two glowing geodesic domes sitting on the devastated Earth surface, surrounded by smaller metal pods. No mention of this shot is found in the script, leaving viewers to speculate if these were meant to be structures built by the Earth settlers (greenhouses, perhaps) or some of the mysterious ruins of the vanished civilisation Bergman mentioned.

With its alternate-future setting, the episode showed the logical progression of the series' two ongoing relationships: the marriage of Koenig and Helena, whose understated love at first sight romance originated in "Breakaway", as well as Morrow and Sandra, whose chaste affair began during "Black Sun" after the death of Sandra's astronaut beau, Mike Ryan.

=== Music ===
An original score was composed for this episode by Barry Gray. Tracks from this episode are used more often than those from any of the other four Gray compositions when scoring subsequent episodes. During the meeting of the two Helenas on Earth, a track of electronic music from UFO (also by Gray) can be heard.

== Reception ==
TV Zone found "Another Time, Another Place" to be one of Space: 1999's stronger episodes, praising its plot and Geeson's "beautifully sympathetic" performance as Kesslann. Video Watchdog considered it one of Year 1's best, describing the script as "well above the series' norm" with several "effectively eerie" scenes, even if the conclusion is "not entirely satisfying".

John Kenneth Muir called the episode "thought-provoking, emotionally involving, and very mysterious". He was especially complimentary of Bain and Geeson's performances. SciFiNow gave the episode 3 out of 5, finding the ending a disappointment. Rating the episode "A-plus", SFX magazine called the ending "tosh, but it doesn't matter in the slightest." Reviewer Chris Bentley praised the performances of Bain, Geeson and Tate.

Dreamwatch Bulletin rated the episode 5 out of 10. According to reviewer Anthony McKay: "Byrne's script once again demonstrates that whilst he is a first-class ideas man, he has little concept of how to construct a workable narrative and has even more problems when trying to craft a dynamic film series. David Tomblin's imaginative direction barely saves this peculiar entry."

== Novelisation ==
The episode was adapted in the second Year One Space: 1999 novel Moon Odyssey by John Rankine, published in 1975.
