= Black Sun (Space: 1999) =

- Space: 1999 episode
- Episode no.: Series 1 Episode 24
- Directed by: Lee H. Katzin
- Written by: David Weir
- Cinematography by: Frank Watts
- Editing by: Mike Campbell
- Production code: SP 3
- Original air date: 6 November 1975

Guest appearances
- Paul Jones as Mike Ryan; Jon Laurimore as Smitty; Vincent Wong as Toshira Fujita; Chai Lee as Anna Wong; Corinne Skinner-Carter as Angela Robinson; Jan Harvey as a newsreader; Jack McKenzie & Richard Eden as Engineers; Sandor Elès as an Eagle technician; David Robb & Marc Zuber as Alphans; Judi Dench as the voice of the Entity; Barbara Kelly as the voice of Computer

Episode chronology
← Previous "Ring Around the Moon"	Next → "The Metamorph"

"Black Sun" is the first series finale of Space: 1999, a 1970s British science fiction television series produced by Group Three for ITC Entertainment. Written by David Weir and directed by Lee H. Katzin, it was the third episode produced and was shot at Pinewood Studios between January and March 1974.

Opening in 1999, the series follows the crew of Earth's lunar colony Moonbase Alpha after a massive nuclear explosion pushes the Moon out of the Solar System, leaving it drifting through interstellar space. Unable to control the new rogue planet's course or speed, the Alphans encounter various astronomical phenomena and alien civilisations and as they search for a way back to Earth or a new world to colonise. In "Black Sun", the Alphans are forced to implement emergency measures when the Moon is caught by the gravitational pull of a black hole.

The episode first aired in the UK on 6 November 1975 on Associated and Yorkshire Television. It received mixed reviews from commentators, who praised its development of the series' main characters but criticised other aspects of the writing and story. The episode was later paired with "Collision Course" to create the Space: 1999 compilation film Journey Through the Black Sun, released by ITC Entertainment in 1982.

== Plot ==
During a typical day on Moonbase Alpha, the personnel in Main Mission are alarmed when an asteroid changes course and heads towards the Moon. At the last moment it changes course again and moves into a dark patch of nearby space; it becomes distorted and finally explodes as it is ripped apart. An Eagle is sent to investigate, but is caught by the anomaly's gravity and pulled inside; it too is destroyed.

Professor Bergman informs Commander Koenig that the phenomenon is a black hole, and that it will consume the Moon three days from now. Exploiting Alpha's network of anti-gravity towers, Bergman designs a force field which will give the personnel a slim chance of surviving the encounter. On the assumption Bergman's idea fails, Koenig decides to launch a "survival Eagle" with a crew of six, hoping they can escape the black hole and find a planet to settle on. The Eagle crew, selected by Alpha's main computer, includes Dr Russell, Captain Carter and technician Sandra Benes. Russell pleads with Koenig not to send her, but he tells her the decision is final; the Eagle leaves with her aboard.

Because of the force field's massive energy requirements, most of Alpha's systems are shut down. As the Moon approaches the event horizon and temperature drops, the remaining Alphans huddle together for comfort. Koenig and Bergman share an old brandy to keep warm.

The Moon crosses the event horizon and vanishes from view. Alpha's interior takes on an eerie orange glow. Koenig and Bergman appear translucent to each another, as if they were ghosts, before rapidly ageing into old men. They are addressed by an unseen god-like being, which shares the secrets of the universe with them. After an indeterminable period of time – a few seconds, or many years – the Moon exits the black hole and arrives in a new, distant region of space. Alpha and its personnel return to normal. The Eagle unexpectedly returns and an overjoyed Koenig greets the crew. Russell tells Koenig that the Eagle could no more escape the black hole's gravity than the Moon, and was pulled in with it. Given the impossible odds they faced, the Alphans wonder whether they owe their survival to the cosmic entity residing within the black hole.

Having successfully passed through the black hole, the Alphans look forward to exploring new solar systems and, with luck, finding a new home.

== Regular cast ==
- Martin Landau as Commander John Koenig
- Barbara Bain as Dr Helena Russell
- Barry Morse as Professor Victor Bergman
- Prentis Hancock as Controller Paul Morrow
- Clifton Jones as David Kano
- Zienia Merton as Sandra Benes
- Anton Phillips as Dr Bob Mathias
- Nick Tate as Captain Alan Carter
- Suzanne Roquette as Tanya Alexander

== Production ==
As David Weir's script was twice the required length, it had to be condensed and rewritten by series story consultant Christopher Penfold. Penfold's revisions included removing a sequence in which Alpha's main computer refuses to be switched off to conserve power for the force field, and imprisons Bergman in crew quarters until Koenig talks it down. Weir also gave Eagle pilot Mike's (played by Paul Jones) last name as Meyer instead of Ryan, and called for 10 Alphans in the lifeboat Eagle, rather than six.

This was the second Space: 1999 episode to be directed by Lee H. Katzin, who had helmed the series opener, "Breakaway". "Black Sun" was largely filmed between 31 January and 21 February 1974. According to Barry Morse, who found the episode "unusually effective", many of the scenes were improvised. Like "Breakaway", "Black Sun" overran its filming schedule: principal photography was completed several days late. Katzin was not invited to direct any more episodes for the series.

Following a re-shoot on 25 March, and recording of incidental music on 25 April, the episode was completed on 8 May 1974. The force field sound effect was originally created for the film The Terrornauts (1967). In June 1974, BBC Children's game show Screen Test aired behind-the-scenes footage of Morse and Martin Landau in make-up for the scene in why they rapidly age.

== Reception ==
"Black Sun" had a mixed response from commentators, drawing criticism for its story but praise for its characters. Dreamwatch magazine rated the episode 8 out of 10, applauding the direction and the performances of the cast. However, it found the trip through the black hole underwhelming and gave the premise "zero for scientific accuracy". SFX graded the episode an "A", complimenting the character development. SciFiNow rated it 3 out of 5, calling the story "an interesting take on the 'omnipotent beings of light' stereotype". Video Watchdog stated that while the episode tackles existential questions with more "headiness" than most episodes, "the results are merely foolish." It criticised the "twinkly special effects, poor old-age make-up, and far-from-profound commentary".

Ian Fryer considered "Black Sun" the "key episode" of Space: 1999's first series. Pointing out that it was only the third episode made, he noted that it dedicates much of its runtime to exposition (by introducing "black suns", mentioned in later episodes, as accelerators of the Moon's journey) and characterisation (by showing Koenig still adjusting to his role as Commander). Adding that the episode was shown mid-run, which the production had not intended, Fryer argued that this delay may have contributed to Space: 1999's poor reputation among critics, who had missed these explanations and character developments. He also observed that whereas other episodes have well-known guest stars, "Black Sun" is fundamentally about "the people of Moonbase Alpha, their emotions, their relationships [...] [W]e see the Alphans being themselves." Writing that the episode implies "some force or cosmic intelligence" guiding the Alphans, he praised the resolution as "the best example of Space: 1999's poetic, metaphysical leanings being maintained right until a story's close."

Although he commented positively on the characterisation, John Kenneth Muir believed that the episode is spoiled by plot holes and "confusing and contradictory" writing. He elaborated: "Had the story been just a bit more consistent in detail, these character moments would have been the icing on the cake rather than the raison d'être of the story." He felt it to have an overdone sense of mystery, arguing that although the idea of a guiding cosmic force is dramatically sound, the episode "simply holds back too much from the viewer" – noting, for example, that the nature and motives of the cosmic being (voiced by Judi Dench) are never explained. Muir also found the black hole visual effect unconvincing and questioned the episode's approach to science, wondering how Bergman's force field could protect the entire Moon from the effects of the hole. He also queried the repeated substitution of the term "black sun" for black hole. In an article for Cue magazine, Isaac Asimov criticised the episode's use of the term, calling it unnecessary and "completely misleading". Asimov added: "The only conclusion is that the makers of Space: 1999 are chemically free of all traces of scientific knowledge."

Screenwriters Gary Gerani and Paul H. Schulman found the episode incomprehensible: "This story is so filled with holes it's no wonder that they fell through [...] [W]hat did the whole experience mean? Great dramatic emphasis is placed on it but no follow-up or explanation is ever offered. It is pure phantasmagoria." Describing the episode as "an amalgam of all the show's worst failings", DreamWatch Bulletin took issue with the story, calling the final suggestion of divine intervention "a writer's cop-out to beat all writer's cop-outs".
