= Missing Link (Space: 1999) =

- Space: 1999 episode
- Episode no.: Series 1 Episode 20
- Directed by: Ray Austin
- Written by: Edward di Lorenzo
- Editing by: Mike Campbell
- Production code: 7
- Original air date: 3 November 1975

Guest appearances
- Joanna Dunham as Vana; Peter Cushing as Raan; Patrick Brock as Zennite Scientist; June Bolton as June

Episode chronology
← Previous "Guardian of Piri"	Next → "Another Time, Another Place"

"Missing Link" is the 20th episode of the first series of Space: 1999. The screenplay was written by Edward di Lorenzo; the director was Ray Austin. The final shooting script is dated 5 April 1974. Live-action filming took place Monday 22 April 1974 through Thursday 9 May 1974, with one day of second-unit filming on 22 July 1974.

The episode first aired in Australia on 3 November 1975. In the UK, it was first broadcast on 22 January 1976.

== Plot ==
As the Moon travels through a planetary cluster, Commander Koenig leads an Eagle crew surveying the area for minerals. The Eagle is pulled towards one of the planets, forcing Koenig to fire the ship's thrusters to blast it free. On the journey home to Moonbase Alpha, the Eagle suffers complete systems failure and crash-lands in a lunar crater, seriously injuring Koenig. Rescue Eagles take the unconscious commander and the rest of the crew back to Alpha.

Another Koenig, spacesuited and unhurt, leaves the Eagle and returns to Alpha on foot. Entering through an airlock, he finds the base deserted but repeatedly glimpses an unknown humanoid man and woman. The viewscreen in Main Mission shows a magnificent alien city.

Alpha dissolves into a bright, featureless void, and the male humanoid appears. He is Raan of the planet Zenno, the world the Eagle broke away from. His people, the Zennites, are humans at an evolutionary stage two million years in the Alphans' future. With their powerful mental abilities, they can create anything they desire by mere thought. Raan shows Koenig that his trek to Alpha was an illusion and that he is actually on Zenno, while in Alpha's Medical Centre, Dr Russell is battling to keep Koenig's comatose doppelganger alive.

Koenig is put in a simulation of his quarters on Alpha. The Zennites consider him a "missing link" to their primitive human ancestors, and Raan, Zenno's foremost anthropologist, wants to make a detailed study of his mind. Koenig is aghast, feeling reduced to the level of a laboratory animal. In protest, he vows to starve himself to death.

While Koenig sleeps, Raan begins his study. Koenig wakes up in what appears to be Alpha Medical. Initially thinking that his encounter with the Zennites was a dream, he is struck by the uncharacteristic pessimism of Professor Bergman and realises that he is in one of Raan's simulations. While Raan confers with his fellow Zennites, Koenig and Raan's daughter, Vana, develop a romantic attraction.

Vana confronts her father, declaring that they have no right to exploit Koenig. Raan is disturbed that his daughter has fallen for his test subject. Koenig is torn between Vana and his longing for home. Raan tells Koenig that his doppelganger is about to die, which will prevent him from ever going back. Koenig decides to not abandon his people. Vana wants to go with him, but he tells her that she must stay in her own place and time. Devastated, she dematerialises, begging him not to forget her. Seeing Koenig off, Raan concludes that the experiment has shown the need for compromise between humanity's emotiveness and the Zennites' devotion to logic. He wonders whether Koenig's visit will prove to be the rebirth of Zennite emotion.

On Alpha, Koenig's condition is worsening and all efforts to revive him have failed. Russell tearfully switches off his life support apparatus over Captain Carter's objections. As the doppelganger flatlines, the real Koenig takes his place and comes out of coma, to the joy of all present.

== Regular cast ==
- Martin Landau as Commander John Koenig
- Barbara Bain as Dr Helena Russell
- Barry Morse as Professor Victor Bergman
- Prentis Hancock as Controller Paul Morrow
- Clifton Jones as David Kano
- Zienia Merton as Sandra Benes
- Anton Phillips as Dr Bob Mathias
- Nick Tate as Captain Alan Carter
- Suzanne Roquette as Tanya Alexander (uncredited)

== Production ==
The second of two scripts penned by American script editor Edward di Lorenzo during his short tenure on the series, "Missing Link" is an abstract love story loosely based on William Shakespeare's play The Tempest. Unhappy with the rewrites dictated by the New York ITC office (which was vetting every story document and script draft after their displeasure with the original cut of "Black Sun"), di Lorenzo left the series to work on his novel White Light.

Several sequences found in the script were filmed, but cut for time: (1) The hook, where the survey mission was for minerals detected on the Moon, not an alien planet. This sequence would be re-mounted in July by the second unit; (2) The fact that Vana was 218 years old and Raan 507; (3) Much of the subtle evidence that Koenig's romance with Vana was initially a deception; (4) Comments by both Zenites that their emotions toward Koenig rendered them incapable of reading his mind. In the 'This Episode' montage, two cut scenes were used: (1) Koenig, Raan and Vana transporting from the orange void to the image of Koenig's quarters and (2) Sandra stumbling across the diagnostic unit as Raan begins to transport her to Zenno.

Peter Cushing was a familiar face in both Britain and America due to his many appearances in Hammer 'Horror' films, playing Victor Frankenstein and Abraham van Helsing. Other roles included Sherlock Holmes and Dr. Who (not to be confused with the Doctor from Doctor Who) in two cinematic adaptations of the BBC series.

Production designer Keith Wilson made a final modification to the Main Mission set before this episode. David Kano would be given a workstation set atop a Lazy Susan-style platform. Situated in the centre of the existing desks, he could now be easily included in most camera set-ups. Before this, Clifton Jones was always standing off to one side by the computer banks. The platform was designed to be manually rotated by hidden stagehands, who were more than once accidentally trod upon by the actors. This was also the first appearance of the 'survey Eagle' modification to the passenger module set.

There is a misspelling of Koenig's last name on a computerised scanner as "Keonig" instead of "Koenig".

=== Music ===
In addition to the regular Barry Gray score (drawn primarily from "Breakaway" and "Another Time, Another Place"), a music track from the earlier Gerry Anderson productions Joe 90 and Stingray, also composed by Gray, was used. The electronic-organ composition used as 'Vana's Theme' was a discarded track written by Gray and Alan Willis; it was originally intended to be played over establishing shots of Moonbase Alpha in 'Breakaway' and subsequent episodes. The script specified that the love theme from Richard Wagner's opera Tristan and Isolde would play during scenes between Koenig and Vana, but this was never done.

== Reception ==
Commentator James O'Neill rated "Missing Link" 3 out of 4, regarding it as "above average" for Space: 1999. SciFiNow magazine gave it 2 out of 5, negatively comparing Koenig's role to that of Star Trek's James T. Kirk. SFX rated it "C-plus", calling it "interesting and philosophical, but not very exciting". Awarding 7 out of 10, Dreamwatch Bulletin commented that while the episode is helped by good direction and the performance from Landau, its "fascinating" premise becomes "overlong and padded" in execution.

TV Zone magazine argued that the episode's "stunning visuals and imagery" make up for its story, which it found "bizarre" and "unremarkable". Journalist and Space: 1999 fan Shaqui Le Vesconte commented that "The script and direction make it unclear if Koenig really is in love, or is simply using [Vana] to force Raan's increasingly angered hand and release him."

John Kenneth Muir praised the cinematography and Austin's direction of the scenes set on Zenno, but argued that the sequence of Koenig in the empty Alpha "goes on far too long". He also complimented the emotionally-charged interactions among the other Alphans, as well as the performances from the guest stars, even if Dunham "looks perhaps a little too mature to be playing a character of such naïveté and innocence."

Though he found the episode to be an "uninspired rehash" of Star Trek's "The Cage", John Charles of Video Watchdog wrote that it was lifted by Cushing's performance, stating that the actor is "encumbered by giggle-inducing make-up and costuming, but still manages to imbue his character with dignity."

== Novelisation ==
The episode was adapted in the third Year One Space: 1999 novel The Space Guardians by Brian Ball, published in 1975. Ball's adaptation is true to the story, but some liberties are taken: (1) The original premise of the survey mission searching for a mineral deposit on the Moon is retained; (2) During Raan's first experiment, Koenig's encounter with the faux-Bergman is much longer; Koenig is told the mineral deposit was actually a buried alien vessel. When visiting the vessel, 'Bergman' proposes abandoning the Alphans to return home, prompting Koenig to realise the situation is not real;(3) The discord on Alpha is more graphically represented by an armed technician threatening Morrow in Main Mission, and a crowd rioting outside the diagnostic unit.
