= Christopher Penfold =

British scriptwriter and editor (1941–2024)

- Born: 9 March 1941; Bristol, England
- Died: 29 July 2024 (aged 83)
- Education: St John's School, Leatherhead; Selwyn College, Cambridge
- Occupations: Screenwriter, editor
- Spouse(s): Mary Baxter (m. 1967; div. 2005) Judy Loncraine (m. 2013)
- Children: 4 biological, 3 stepchildren

Christopher Penfold (9 March 1941 – 29 July 2024) was a British scriptwriter and editor.

== Life and career ==
Penfold was born in Bristol, England on 9 March 1941, to Leonard and Kathleen Penfold. His father was a local vicar, and his mother worked as a lab technician.

Television shows on which he worked on included Pathfinders, One by One, All Creatures Great and Small, EastEnders, Casualty, The Brack Report, the second season of John Christopher's The Tripods, and thirteen series of Midsomer Murders. He also wrote the film Take Me High.

Penfold is perhaps best known for being one of the brains behind Gerry Anderson's science fiction series Space: 1999. He worked as story consultant for the original series (first 16 episodes of the 24-part series) and is credited for writing "Guardian of Piri" (based on a script by David Weir), "Alpha Child" (based on a script by Edward di Lorenzo), "The Last Sunset", "War Games", "Space Brain" and "Dragon's Domain" for the first series and "Dorzak" as a freelance contributor for the second. Penfold was uncredited for re-writing the series' premiere "Breakaway" as well as David Weir's "Black Sun" and fellow staff member Edward di Lorenzo's "Missing Link".

In 2010, Penfold contributed a foreword to the novel Space: 1999 Omega and its sequel novel Space: 1999 Alpha. Both novels were written by William Latham and published by Powys Media, and were released simultaneously on 27 February 2010. Penfold is thanked in the ending credits of the Jonathan Glazer 2013 film Under the Skin.

Penfold died on 29 July 2024, at the age of 83.
