= Brian N. Ball =

English writer (1932–2020)

- Born: Brian Neville Ball; 19 June 1932 Cheshire, England
- Died: 23 July 2020 (aged 88) Doncaster, South Yorkshire, England
- Education: Chester College; London University; Sheffield University

Brian N. Ball (19 June 1932 – 23 July 2020) was an English author of speculative fiction, known mainly for his three series Timepiece, Probability Man, and Jackson, as well as numerous standalone novels. In all, he authored some 90 novels.

Ball attended Chester College from 1953 to 1955, received a BA from London University in 1960, and then an MA from Sheffield University in 1968. His degree was in theology, though he was an atheist.

Ball became a senior lecturer at Doncaster College of Education in 1965, and was a visiting member of the University of British Columbia. His death, in July 2020, was after a long illness.

== Select Bibliography ==
=== Jackson Series ===
- Jackson's House (1974)
- Jackson's Friend (1975)
- Jackson's Holiday (1977)
- Jackson and the Magpies (1978)

=== The Probability Man Series ===
- The Probability Man (1972)
- Planet Probability (1973)

=== Timepiece Series ===
- Timepiece (1968)
- Timepivot (1970)
- Timepit (1971)

=== Witchfinder Series ===
- The Mark of the Beast (1971)
- The Evil at Monteine (1977)

=== Space 1999 ===
- The Space Guardians (1975)
- Survival (2005)

=== Miscellaneous Novels ===
- Sundog (1965)
- Lesson for the Damned (1971)
- Devil's Peak (1972)
- The Regiments of Night (1972)
- Singularity Station (1973)
- The Venomous Serpent (1974)
- The Starbuggy (1983)
- The Doomship of Drax (1985)
- Malice of the Soul (2008)

=== Anthologies ===
- Tales of Science Fiction (ed) (1964)

=== Nonfiction ===
- Young Person's Guide to UFOs (1979)
