= Philip Harbottle =

Philip Harbottle (born 1941) is a British official best known as a science-fiction researcher and critic specializing in the British science fiction. According to The Encyclopedia of Science Fiction he is "the world authority on the works of John Russell Fearn", whose literary estate he represents,. Harbottle also penned up several biographical articles and monographs on Fearn. He was the editor the Vision of Tomorrow magazine (from August 1969-September 1970) and several anthologies.
