= Breakaway (Space: 1999) =

- Space: 1999 episode
- Nuclear Disposal Area 2 explodes, throwing the Moon out of orbit.
- Episode no.: Series 1 Episode 1
- Directed by: Lee H. Katzin
- Written by: George Bellak
- Production code: SP 1
- Original air date: 16 May 1975

Guest appearances
- Roy Dotrice as Commissioner Simmonds; Philip Madoc as Commander Gorski; Lon Satton as Benjamin Ouma; Eric Carte as Astronaut Collins; Tony Allyn as Security Guard; Roy Scammell as Jim Nordstrom; Alf Joint as Steiner; Don Fellows as GTV Newsreader; Laurie Davis as Eagle 2 Stewardess; Shane Rimmer as Eagle 2 Pilot Voice; Barbara Kelly as Computer Voice; Nik Zaran as Astronaut Jackson; Robin Scott as Eric Sparkman; Milos Kirek as Young (Technical)

Episode chronology
← Previous —	Next → "Matter of Life and Death"

"Breakaway" is the first episode of the first series of Space: 1999. It was written by George Bellak (with an uncredited rewrite by story consultant Christopher Penfold) and directed by Lee H. Katzin. Working titles include "Zero-G", "The Void Ahead" and "Turning Point". The final shooting script is dated 22 November 1973. Live-action filming took place from 3 December 1973 to 11 January 1974 (with breaks for Christmas and New Year). A three-day re-mount took place from 22 February 1974 to 26 February 1974.

The episode was first shown in Australia, where it was first broadcast by CTC7 on 16 May 1975. In the UK, it first aired on 4 September 1975.

== Plot ==
In September 1999, an Eagle Transporter lands at Nuclear Disposal Area 2, a storage facility on the Moon for Earth's radioactive waste. As machines offload the Eagle's cargo of lead drums, two technicians check for radiation leakage. One of them experiences a seizure, attacks the other, and dies from explosive decompression after being repelled by a laser barrier and breaking his helmet on the ground. Meanwhile, John Koenig is en route to the Moon to take up his appointment as commander of Moonbase Alpha. Commissioner Simmonds of the World Space Commission informs Koenig that the launch from the orbiting lunar Space Dock of a mission to Meta – a rogue planet passing through the outer Solar System, which scientists theorise may harbour intelligent life – must proceed despite a virus outbreak among the Meta Probe astronauts and other lunar personnel.

Arriving at Alpha, Koenig learns from Professor Victor Bergman that the outbreak is a cover story for the deaths of nine workers at Nuclear Disposal Area 2, who succumbed to an unidentified neurological disease. Now two of the Meta crew have been left in a terminal vegetative state. Dr Helena Russell reveals that the astronauts' symptoms indicate radiation-induced cerebral cancer. However, there is no evidence of radiation exposure. Koenig and Bergman depart in an Eagle to carry out radiation checks on the Nuclear Disposal Areas, starting with the obsolete Area 1. When they move on to the much larger Area 2, their pilot develops signs of the disease and tries to smash an observation window, forcing Koenig to stun him with his laser sidearm.

An investigation uncovers a link among the sick personnel: they all made flights over Area 1, where heat levels are now rising. Flying out in another Eagle, Koenig encounters energy discharges from the waste silos which cause his instruments to fail, forcing him to crash-land. He is rescued and Area 1 is consumed by explosions. Further examination shows that the disease and Area 1's destruction were caused by magnetic radiation from the waste pile. When Commissioner Simmonds arrives at Alpha to follow up on the Meta mission preparations, Koenig tells him that Area 2 – now also heating up – has become a massive time bomb.

Bergman suggests dispersing the contents of Area 2 to weaken the explosion. However, the Eagle fleet's operation to empty the silos ends in disaster when the radiation surges, starting a chain reaction of energy discharges and explosions that obliterates Area 2 and spreads to the waste containers strewn over the lunar surface. The whole region erupts in a fireball that creates a rocket-like thrust, causing the Moon to break out of Earth orbit and leave the Solar System. The Space Dock and most of the Eagles are destroyed, and the Meta Probe is hurled into deep space.

Though damaged by extreme g-forces and seismic shocks, Alpha remains intact. However, the Moon's trajectory is uncertain. Knowing that any attempt to return to Earth would fail, Koenig decides not to initiate an emergency evacuation. As the crew of 311 grapple with the reality of being adrift in space, hopes are raised when instruments pick up radio signals from Meta that were previously detected on Earth. Koenig speculates that their future may lie on Meta.

== Regular cast ==
- Martin Landau as Commander John Koenig
- Barbara Bain as Dr Helena Russell
- Barry Morse as Professor Victor Bergman
- Prentis Hancock as Controller Paul Morrow
- Zienia Merton as Sandra Benes
- Anton Phillips as Doctor Bob Mathias
- Nick Tate as Captain Alan Carter
- Suzanne Roquette as Tanya Alexander (uncredited)

== Production ==
The premiere episode's troubled production history is detailed in the main article. From Gerry Anderson's autobiography, What Made Thunderbirds Go: 'The New York office assured me Lee Katzin was "the best pilot director in America",' remembers Anderson. 'The schedule for shooting the first episode was ten days, but it overran and soon we were tens of thousands of pounds over budget.' (The planned shoot was stretched to twenty-five days by the director's meticulous style of filming multiple takes of each camera angle while running each scene in its entirety.) Katzin finished editing his footage and screened the completed "Breakaway" for Anderson. 'It ran for over two hours,' he remembers, 'and I thought it was awful. He went back to America and I sent a cutting copy of the episode to Abe Mandell. Abe phoned me in a fit of depression, saying, "Oh, my god, it's terrible—what are we going to do?" I wrote a lot of new scenes myself and these were filmed over three days. I'm pretty sure I directed them myself.' (These re-mounted scenes were filmed between "Black Sun" and "Ring Around the Moon".) 'I then totally recut the episode to fifty minutes, inserting the new footage.'

Scenes deleted from Katzin director's cut include: (1) Koenig watching Simmonds interviewed on a news programme (while providing expositional dialogue about Meta and the probe) before his live conversation with the Commissioner while flying to Alpha. It also reveals that Koenig had also been the first Alpha commander; (2) Ex-Commander Gorski having a conversation with Koenig before leaving, reinforcing Simmonds' dogma about the secrecy regarding the Meta Probe setbacks. He would then express disdain for Helena, her personal judgement and professional competence; (3) Russell giving Koenig an autopsy report on the Probe astronauts and Collins. He would bring up Gorski's opinions of her. She then revealed Gorski made advances, which she rebuffed—this "questionable judgement" being the cause of him disregarding her findings and suppressing her reports; (4) Morrow listening to the Meta signals with Koenig, hoping the probe mission will answer all their questions. Audio recordings of these scenes were recovered in February 2011 and are available on YouTube and the Space: 1999 website 'The Catacombs' under the "Breakaway" episode guide.

The storyline involving Meta is never resolved. The next episode produced, "Matter of Life and Death", takes place sometime later as the Moon approaches an obviously different planet, codenamed "Terra Nova" (although the officially-published 1977 The Moonbase Alpha Technical Notebook states that they are the same). The fan-produced short film Message from Moonbase Alpha proposes that a final transmission sent from Alpha by Sandra Benes twenty years after "Breakaway" was temporally shifted into the past to become the Meta signals heard in the first episode.

Lon Satton's character Benjamin Ouma was originally intended to remain as a series regular, but other members of the cast found him difficult to work with, and he was replaced by the character David Kano, portrayed by Clifton Jones, by the next episode.

=== Music ===
An original score was composed for this episode by Barry Gray. A long-time Anderson team member, Gray's work gave the series a profound symphonic statement, to express the grandeur of space. The electric guitar segments were performed by producer Sylvia Anderson's son-in-law, musician Vic Elmes. As Katzin's unsatisfactory director's cut necessitated considerable re-editing and filming of new footage, the score was composed and recorded after that of "Matter of Life and Death".

== Reception ==
Daily Variety wrote that "[i]magination has been given free rein in George Bellak's initial script, which looks conservative compared to succeeding segs." It considered the story "realistic", aided by the visuals and "shrewd" editing, even if there are moments that "[strain] credulity". James Van Hise found the episode "very slow and drawn out, the only point of interest being the few minutes when the explosions occurred." According to St. Petersburg, Florida's Evening Telegraph, the Alphans' commlocks and other technologies were the most interesting aspect of the story other than the ending.

Later critical response to "Breakaway" has been positive. SFX magazine gave the episode an "A+" rating, Dreamwatch gave it 7 out of 10, and SciFiNow gave it 4 out of 5.

In an episode-by-episode analysis of Space: 1999, John Kenneth Muir gave "Breakaway" a positive review. He described the episode as a "streamlined hour which elegantly sets up many of the series' tenets", favourably comparing its "wonderfully simple" construction to that of later science fiction pilots such as "Encounter at Farpoint" (Star Trek: The Next Generation) and the Battlestar Galactica miniseries. He also praised the production design and special effects, calling Moonbase Alpha "stunningly presented".

TV Zone magazine described "Breakaway" as "a fine first episode. The plot races along, while a sense of disaster builds throughout. The final explosive ending, when it does come, is worthy of an Irwin Allen disaster movie." The reviewer regretted that the side story about the Meta Probe was left unresolved.

== Novelisation ==
The episode was adapted in the first Year One Space: 1999 novel Breakaway by E.C. Tubb, published in 1975. Tubb, an experienced science fiction author, retained the basic storyline and made significant changes in content and dialogue. Some of the material edited from the original two-hour director's cut can be found here. The greatest change was that Commissioner Simmonds dies from injuries sustained during the Moon's breakaway. This would cause Futura to omit the subsequent story "Earthbound", which addressed the Commissioner's fate, from the novel series.

Tubb injected a great deal of 1970s-era scientific knowledge and speculation for the reasons behind the atomic waste's behaviour (the particular blend of waste, high in caesium and lithium contaminants, coupled with the coincidental presence of an iron-based mineral in the rock strata the Disposal Areas were constructed upon was speculated to have precipitated the disaster) and explained the mechanics involved in the Moon's movement out of orbit.
