= Lee H. Katzin =

American film director (1935–2002)

- Born: April 12, 1935; Detroit, Michigan, U.S.
- Died: October 30, 2002 (aged 67); Beverly Hills, California, U.S.
- Occupation: Film director

Lee H. Katzin (April 12, 1935 – October 30, 2002) was an American film director.

== Early life and education ==
He was born in Detroit, Michigan and became a TV director in the late 1960s for TV shows that included Bonanza, Mission: Impossible and Police Story. He also directed the 1971 feature film Le Mans.

== Career ==
Starting in 1969, he did an array of theatrical films starting with Heaven with a Gun and other films like The Break and the cult classic What Ever Happened to Aunt Alice? In 1972, he directed the film The Salzburg Connection, which starred Barry Newman and Anna Karina.

In 1975, he directed the launch episode "Breakaway", and other early episodes, of the Gerry Anderson live-action series Space: 1999. He also directed the pilots for the television series Man from Atlantis and Spenser: For Hire. He was primarily known as a prolific episodic television director, and he worked on series such as MacGyver, Police Story, The Young Riders, and Mission Impossible. He died of cancer at the age of 67 in 2002 in Beverly Hills, California.

== Filmography ==
Film
Year	Title	Director	Assistant director	Notes
1961	Five Bold Women	No	No	Production coordinator
1961	Three Blondes in His Life	No	Yes	
1966	Ride Beyond Vengeance	No	Yes	
1969	Heaven with a Gun	Yes	No	
1969	What Ever Happened to Aunt Alice?	Yes	No	
1970	The Phynx	Yes	No	
1971	Le Mans	Yes	No	
1972	The Salzburg Connection	Yes	No	
1987	World Gone Wild	Yes	No	
1995	The Break	Yes	No	
1999	Restraining Order	Yes	No	

Television films
Year	Title	Director	Assistant director	Notes
1961	Las Vegas Beat	No	No	Second unit assistant
1964	Fanfare for a Death Scene	No	Yes	
1967	Hondo and the Apaches	Yes	No	
1970	Along Came a Spider	Yes	No	
1972	Visions...	Yes	No	
1973	Voyage of the Yes	Yes	No	
1973	The Stranger	Yes	No	
1973	Ordeal	Yes	No	
1974	Savages	Yes	No	
1974	Strange Homecoming	Yes	No	
1975	The Last Survivors	Yes	No	
1975	Sky Heist	Yes	No	
1976	The Quest	Yes	No	
1976	Alien Attack	Yes	No	
1977	Relentless	Yes	No	
1977	McLaren's Riders	Yes	No	
1978	Zuma Beach	Yes	No	
1978	Terror Out of the Sky	Yes	No	
1979	Samurai	Yes	No	
1980	Death Ray 2000	Yes	No	
1980	Police Story: Confessions of a Lady Cop	Yes	No	
1981	Hardcase	Yes	No	
1982	The Neighborhood	Yes	No	
1982	Journey Through the Black Sun	Yes	No	
1983	Emergency Room	Yes	No	
1985	The Eagle and the Bear	Yes	No	
1985	The Adventures of Alexander Hawkins	Yes	No	
1985	Soloman's Universe	Yes	No	
1987	The Dirty Dozen: The Deadly Mission	Yes	No	
1988	The Dirty Dozen: The Fatal Mission	Yes	No	
1989	Jake Spanner, Private Eye	Yes	No	

Television series
Year	Title	Director	Assistant director	Notes
1961	The Rebel	No	Yes	Season 2 (8 episodes)
1963	Stoney Burke	No	Yes	Season 1 (2 episodes)
1963	The Outer Limits	No	Yes	Season 1 (9 episodes)
1964–65	Rawhide	No	Yes	Season 7 (13 episodes)
1965	Branded	Yes	Yes	Season 1–2 (8 episodes), (AD) Season 2 (6 episodes) (D)
1965	The Patty Duke Show	No	Yes	Season 3 (1 episode)
1966	The Wild Wild West	Yes	No	Season 1 (2 episodes)
1966	The Wild Wild West	No	No	Unit production manager – Season 2 (7 episodes)
1966–67	The Rat Patrol	Yes	No	Season 1 (7 episodes)
1967	The Felony Squad	Yes	No	Season 1 (2 episodes)
1967–68	Mission: Impossible	Yes	No	Season 1–3 (11 episodes)
1967	Hondo	Yes	No	Season 1 (4 episodes)
1967	Mannix	Yes	No	Season 1 (1 episode)
1968	It Takes a Thief	Yes	No	Season 1 (1 episode)
1968	The Mod Squad	Yes	No	Season 1 (2 episodes)
1970	Storefront Lawyers	Yes	No	Season 1 (1 episode)
1974	McMillan & Wife	Yes	No	Season 3 (1 episode)
1975	Space: 1999	Yes	No	Season 1 (2 episodes)
1975–80	Police Story	Yes	No	Season 3, 5–6 (5 episodes)
1977	Man from Atlantis	Yes	No	Season 1 (1 episode)
1978	The Bastard	Yes	No	Miniseries
1982	McClain's Law	Yes	No	Season 1 (1 episodes)
1982	Chicago Story	Yes	No	Season 1 (1 episode)
1982	CHiPs	Yes	No	Season 5 (1 episode)
1982	The Devlin Connection	Yes	No	Season 1 (1 episode)
1983	The Mississippi	Yes	No	Season 1 (2 episodes)
1983	Automan	Yes	No	Season 1 (1 episode)
1983–84	The Yellow Rose	Yes	No	Season 1 (10 episodes)
1984	Partners in Crime	Yes	No	Season 1 (1 episode)
1984	Miami Vice	Yes	No	Season 1 (2 episodes)
1985	Spenser: For Hire	Yes	No	Season 1 (1 episode)
1985	MacGyver	Yes	No	Season 1 (1 episode)
1985	MacGyver	No	No	Opening gambit director – Season 1 (4 episodes)
1988–89	In the Heat of the Night	Yes	No	Season 2 (3 episodes)
1989–92	The Young Riders	Yes	No	Season 1, 3 (6 episodes)
1990	The Outsiders	Yes	No	Season 1 (1 episode)
1991	The Exile	Yes	No	Season 1 (1 episode)
1991	P.S. I Luv U	Yes	No	Season 1 (1 episode)
1993	Raven	Yes	No	Season 2 (1 episode)
1994	Walker, Texas Ranger	Yes	No	Season 2 (1 episode)
1994	Renegade	Yes	No	Season 3 (1 episode)
1994	Fortune Hunter	Yes	No	Season 1 (2 episodes)
