= Video Watchdog =

Defunct bimonthly, digest size film magazine (1990-2017)

- Cover of Video Watchdog's first issue
- Editor: Tim Lucas
- Categories: Film
- Frequency: Bimonthly
- Founded: 1990
- Final issue Number: 2017; 184
- Country: United States
- Based in: Cincinnati, Ohio
- Language: English
- Website: http://videowatchdog.com/
- ISSN: 1070-9991

Video Watchdog was a bimonthly, digest size film magazine published from 1990 to 2017 by publisher/editor Tim Lucas and his wife, art director and co-publisher Donna Lucas.

Although devoted chiefly to the horror, science fiction, and fantasy genres, the magazine frequently delved beyond these strictures into art film, Hong Kong action cinema, Spaghetti Western, exploitation films, anime, and general mainstream cinema. In addition to Lucas himself, Video Watchdog's list of regular contributors included such writers as Kim Newman, Stephen R. Bissette, associate editor John Charles, Bill Cooke and Heather Drain. Regular columns included "Ramsey's Rambles" by Ramsey Campbell and "Fleapit Flashbacks" by Joe Dante. Douglas E. Winter contributed a CD/music column, "Audio Watchdog," while books were reviewed in "Biblio Watchdog" by Lucas, Anthony Ambrogio and Brett Taylor.

== Publication history ==
Originally a black-and-white publication, Video Watchdog was founded in 1990. The magazine added full-color covers with its 13th issue, and celebrated its 100th issue in 2003 by adopting a permanent, full-color format. Los Angeles-based artist Charlie Largent was responsible for most of the cover art from 2002 to the penultimate issue in 2016, beginning with #84. Two Video Watchdog Special Editions were also published, as well as two Video Watchdog Signature Editions, the latter featuring unique covers individually signed by child stars Donnie Dunagan and Ann Carter.

The magazine's website included "Round Table" film discussions, free article samples, and a link to Lucas' "Video WatchBlog", launched in October 2005.

On October 24, 2016, it was announced that the magazine would cease print publication. Days later, those who had paid for subscriptions and other creditors received notice that the magazine had filed for Chapter 7 Bankruptcy. A surprise final issue, #184, was mailed to subscribers in June, 2017 as a farewell gesture and was later made available to the general public in limited quantities via the Video Watchdog website.

== Related publications ==
As a company, Video Watchdog also published two books written by editor Lucas. The Video Watchdog Book, released September 1992, is a collection of articles, essays, and lists that originated in other magazines, including Film Comment and Fangoria. Mario Bava All the Colors of the Dark, published September 2007, is a copiously illustrated, 1128-page critical biography of Italian director and cinematographer Mario Bava. It received a Rondo Hatton Classic Horror Award as the Best Book of 2007, as well as an Independent Publishers Award bronze medal and a Saturn Award for Special Achievement.

== Awards ==
- Best Magazine - Rondo Hatton Classic Horror Awards 2002, 2003, 2004, 2005, 2006.
- Best Website - Rondo Classic Horror Award 2006.
- Best Theme Issue (#169, Dark Shadows) - Rondo Classic Horror Award 2012.
- Best Semi-Prozine - FanEx Award, 1991.

== See also ==
- List of film periodicals
