= Dreamwatch =

- The 119th issue of Dreamwatch
- Editor: Brian J. Robb
- Categories: Science fiction related
- Frequency: Monthly
- First issue: July 1983
- Final issue Number: January 2007; 150
- Company: Titan Magazines
- Country: United Kingdom
- Based in: Brighton
- Website: www.dwscifi.com
- ISSN: 1351-2471
- OCLC: 500077966

Dreamwatch was a British magazine covering science fiction and fantasy films, books and television programmes.

Published monthly by Gary Leigh (July 1983 to January 2001) and then Titan Magazines (2001 to 2007), it was a leading genre entertainment magazine, competing with SFX and Cinescape in the genre magazine market.

== Overview ==
The publication began life in July 1983 as an amateur fanzine dedicated to the popular science-fiction television series Doctor Who, and was published under the title Doctor Who Bulletin. In this form, it became well known for taking a generally critical tone towards the later seasons of the programme, particularly the work of producer John Nathan-Turner, who was subjected to several personal attacks within its pages.

Nevertheless, the publication became popular with some fans due to both its general attitude and its frequent reporting of news concerning the show before it was released through official sources, such as the officially sanctioned Doctor Who Magazine or Celestial Toyroom, the newsletter of the Doctor Who Appreciation Society.

The fanzine also gained a reputation for being sometimes too willing to report rumour as fact. For example, they published an obituary for actor Kevin Stoney in 1986; Stoney, who was very much still alive, would go on to happily sign copies of the obituary for fans at conventions.

In 1989, the fanzine expanded to cover other genre films and television series as well as Doctor Who, and, as a consequence, the title was changed to DreamWatch Bulletin in order that the popular (and graphically appealing) abbreviation dwb would remain intact. In 1994, the zine was relaunched as a fully professional newsstand magazine: the title was shortened to simply Dreamwatch, and the numbering of the magazine was restarted from issue 1.

The original fanzine was founded and edited by Gary Levy, who later changed his surname to Leigh. He edited the first hundred issues, before handing over editorial reins first to David Gibbs (issues 101–110) and then to Anthony Brown (111–130), after which the professional version was launched (with numbering beginning again at issue 1, and with Anthony Clark and then Paul Simpson as editors until issue 71). Leigh returned as editor with issue 72, aided by co-editor Simon J. Gerard who worked on the title on a day-to-day basis. Leigh retained ownership of the title until 2001, when he sold the magazine to Titan Magazines, part of the Titan Entertainment Group owned by Nick Landau. Gerard moved across to Titan with Dreamwatch and took the role of Contributing Editor.

Brian J. Robb became Editor/Managing Editor in June 2001 (issue 81) and continued through to September 2003 (issue 108) which marked DWB's 20th continuous year of publication. Former Deputy Editor David Bassom served as Editor from issue 109 to 123, and launched the stand-alone US edition with the help of Deputy Editor Matthew Chapman. Robb became Editor/Managing Editor of Dreamwatch once more from January 2005 (issue 124) until October 2006 (issue 145). Former deputy editor Richard Matthews then became editor for a few issues (until issue 148) before the editorship returned to Robb until issue 150, which was the last print edition, published on 25 January 2007 (issue 280 if counted from the debut issue in July 1983).

At the end of January 2007, the magazine became a web-only publication entitled Total Sci-Fi, offering SF news and features and Dreamwatch/DWB archive at www.totalscifionline.com. The website was edited by Matt McAllister, and counted many former Dreamwatch writers among its contributors. It was placed on indefinite hiatus in 2011.
