= Suzanne Roquette =

German actress (1942–2020)

- Born: 30 August 1942; Germany
- Died: 28 May 2020 (aged 77); United Kingdom
- Occupation: Actress
- Years active: 1964–2001
- Notable credit: Space: 1999

Suzanne Roquette (30 August 1942 – 28 May 2020) was a German actress. Born in either Weimar or Berlin, she is best known for her role as Main Mission operative Tanya Alexander in Year 1 of the British science fiction television series Space: 1999, appearing in 22 episodes.

Roquette was diagnosed with acute kidney injury in the 1990s and underwent a kidney transplant in 2015. She was a longtime adherent of Soka Gakkai International. Following her death in 2020, she was cremated at Beckenham Crematorium and Cemetery after a Buddhist funeral.

== Filmography ==
=== Films ===
Year	Title	Role	Notes
1964	Frühstück mit dem Tod		
1965	Red Dragon	Linda Wells	German title: Das Geheimnis der drei Dschunken
1966	Sperrbezirk	Ann	
1966	The Hunchback of Soho	Laura	German title: Der Bucklige von Soho
1967	The Vengeance of Fu Manchu	Maria Lieberson	(Listed in credits as Susanne Roquette)
1967	The College Girl Murders	Mary Houston	
1968	The Doctor of St. Pauli	Elisabeth Langhoff	
1989	Indiana Jones and the Last Crusade	Film Director	Scenes deleted from the final cut, though still credited
1992	Shining Through	Dinner Guest at Dreschner's	

== Selected TV credits ==
Year	Title	Role	Notes
1970	Das Millionenspiel	Claudia von Hohenheim	
1974	Special Branch	Heidi Schneider	Ep. 'Date of Birth'
1975–1976	Space: 1999	Tanya Aleksandr / Alexander	22 Episodes
1976	Hadleigh	Elfreda von Hermsdorff	Ep. 'Bloodline'
1977	Tatort	Martina Quaas	Ep. 'Flieder für Jaczek'
1978	An Englishman's Castle	Ania	Ep. 1.2
1979	Spearhead	Frau Gerhard	Ep. 'New Brooms'
1982	Sorry!	The Empress	Ep. 'The Big Sleep'
1993	Lovejoy	German Customer	Ep. 'A Going Concern'
1993	Gute Zeiten, schlechte Zeiten	Dorothea Thalberg	Ep. 1.1348
2001	Band of Brothers	German Widow	Ep. "Why We Fight", (final appearance)
