= Zienia Merton =

British actress (1945–2018)

- Merton as Sandra Benes in Space: 1999
- Born: 11 December 1945; Arakan Division, British Burma
- Died: 14 September 2018 (aged 72)
- Education: Arts Educational School
- Occupations: Actress; author
- Years active: 1962–2018
- Notable work: Space: 1999

Zienia Merton (11 December 1945 – 14 September 2018) was a British actress born in Burma. She was known for playing Sandra Benes in Space: 1999.

== Early career ==
Merton was the daughter of Minny and Cecil Burton. Her mother was Burmese, and her father was a half-English, half-French merchant. She was raised in Singapore, Portugal and England. She was educated at first in Portugal, but was later sent to Arts Educational school (today the Tring Park School for the Performing Arts) in Hertfordshire. Her first stage performance was as a dancer (playing a rat) in a Christmas 1957 production of The Nutcracker ballet at the Royal Festival Hall.

Merton's first significant science-fiction credit was as Ping-Cho in the 1964 Doctor Who story Marco Polo, long since lost in its original form. Her other early television appearances included Strange Report (1968), The Six Wives of Henry VIII (1970) and Jason King (1971). She was a lead actress as Christina in the 1971 Dennis Potter TV adaptation of Casanova with Frank Finlay, and appeared on The Benny Hill Show in 1972, playing the wife of Hill's Chow Mein character. Her film roles included a brief appearance as an Asian high priestess in the Beatles' film Help! (1965), as Ting Ling in the film The Chairman (1969) with Gregory Peck, and The Adventurers (1970).

== Space: 1999 ==
Probably her most notable role is that of Sandra Benes in Space: 1999, the science fiction series produced by Gerry Anderson and Sylvia Anderson between 1973 and 1977, with Martin Landau, Barbara Bain, Barry Morse and Catherine Schell. In 1999, Merton reprised this role in the short film Message from Moonbase Alpha, written by series writer Johnny Byrne. Its debut was at the closing ceremony of the Breakaway 1999 convention in Los Angeles, California, US on 13 September 1999; the date on which the moon is blasted out of Earth orbit in the pilot episode of the original series.

== Other performances ==
Following Space: 1999, Merton appeared in many popular television series including Grange Hill, Return of the Saint (1979), Bergerac (1983), Angels (1983), Tenko (1984), Dempsey & Makepeace (1985), Lovejoy (1986), Crime Traveller (1997), Doctors (2001), Dinotopia (2002), Casualty (1986–2002), EastEnders (1998–2003), The Bill (1999–2005), Judge John Deed (2006), Coronation Street (2008) and Wire in the Blood (2008).

In December 2008, Merton filmed a guest role for the eighth episode ("Samaritan") of the ITV drama Law & Order: UK. Although the series premiered on 23 February 2009, some episodes were held over for broadcast as "Series Two". "Samaritan" was first transmitted on ITV1 on 11 January 2010.

In May 2009, Merton returned to the world of Doctor Who, 45 years after her appearance in Marco Polo, to record a special episode of The Sarah Jane Adventures in the two-part episode The Wedding of Sarah Jane Smith, broadcast on BBC One on 29 and 30 October 2009. She played the registrar during Sarah Jane's wedding.

In 2018, Merton narrated BBC Audio's release of the novelisation of Marco Polo. This turned out to be her final professional engagement.

== Death ==
Merton was diagnosed with terminal cancer in 2017, and died 14 September 2018.

== Books ==
Zienia Merton; Robert E. Wood (2005). Anecdotes & Armadillos. self-published. ISBN 1411634845.

== Filmography ==
=== Film ===
Year	Title	Role	Notes
1962	Masters of Venus	Marla	
1965	Catch Us If You Can	Allison	Uncredited
1965	Help!	High Priestess	Uncredited
1969	The Chairman	Ting Ling	
1970	The Adventurers	Dax's Sister	Uncredited
1970	When You're With Me	Princess Tamani	West German film
1972	Henry VIII and His Six Wives	Annette	(scenes deleted)
1977	Kosmetikkrevolusjonen	Lucy Ferner	Norwegian film

=== Television ===
Year	Title	Role	Notes
1964	Doctor Who: Marco Polo	Ping-Cho	Season 1: (7 episodes)
1964	The Indian Tales of Rudyard Kipling	Kashmiri girl	Season 1, Episode 7: "Mark of the Beast"
1969	The Troubleshooters	Liane	Season 5, Episode 23: "It's a Very Bad Day for Travelling"
1969	Thirty-Minute Theatre	Rachel	Season 5, Episode 6: "Trespassers"
1969	Omnibus	Noel	Season 3, Episode 9: "F. Scott Fitzgerald: The Dream Divided"
1969	Strange Report	Zeba Hameed	Season 1, Episode 7: "Report 3424: Epidemic - A Most Curious Crime"
1969	The Root of All Evil?	Medeline	Season 2, Episode 5:"Floating Man"
1970	The Six Wives of Henry VIII	Annette	TV mini-series
1970	W. Somerset Maugham	Malay girl	Season 2, Episode 8: "The Door of Opportunity"
1970	ITV Playhouse	Leila	Season 3, Episode 10: "The High Game"
1971	Casanova	Christina	6 part BBC serial
1972	The Benny Hill Show	Mrs. Chow Mein	Season 3, Episode 4: "Down Memory Lane"
1972	Jason King	Zenia	Season 1, Episode 24: "Zenia"
1972	Crime of Passion	Nicole Martine	Season 3, Episode 3: "Modeste"
1973	Madigan	Natalia	Season 1, Episode 4: "The Lisbon Beat"
1973	Ego Hugo	Guernsey Maid	TV movie
1973	Beryl's Lot	Katy Papademitropoullos	Season 1, Episode 1: "Getting Up"
1975–1977	Space: 1999	Sandra Benes	Season 1: (24 episodes); Season 2: (11 episodes)
1976	Journey Through the Black Sun	Sandra Benes	TV movie
1976	Alien Attack	Sandra Benes	TV movie
1978	Destination Moonbase-Alpha	Sandra Benes	TV movie
1978	Wilde Alliance	Dolores	Season 1, Episode 7: "Well Enough Alone"
1978	Return of the Saint	Mila	Season 1, Episode 2: "The Nightmare Man"
1978	Thank You, Comrades	Olga	TV movie
1979	The Other Side	Kieu	Season 1, Episode 5: "Contacts"
1980	Escape	Unknown	Season 1, Episode 2: "Hijack to Mogadishu"
1981	The History Man	Miss Ho	TV mini-series
1982	Cosmic Princess	Sandra Benes	TV movie
1983	Bergerac	Cora	Season 2, Episode 7: "A Miracle Every Week"
1983	Angels	Sister Davis	Season 9, Episode 25
1984	The Brief	Mrs. Francis	Season 1, Episode 8: "Terry"
1984	Hammer House of Mystery and Suspense	Nurse Lee Parquet	Season 1, Episode 5: "The Late Nancy Irving"
1984	Tenko	Nun	Season 3, Episode 9
1985	Dempsey and Makepeace	Lei Shan	Season 1, Episode 7: "Make Peace Not War"
1985	Grange Hill	Mrs. Wallace	Season 8, Episode 15
1986	Lovejoy	Miss Taylor	Season 1, Episode 2: "The Axeman Cometh"
1986–2002	Casualty	Manson / Dr Helen Billington / Dr. Helen Billington / Hotel Receptionist	4 episodes
1989	Capital City	Melinda Lau	Season 1, Episode 5: "Pension Fund"
1994–2005	The Bill	Registrar / Dr. Morgan / Magistrate / Surgeon	4 episodes
1995	Chiller	Maria Monsanto	Season 1, Episode 1: "Prophecy"
1997	Crime Traveller	Receptionist	Season 1, Episode 7: "The Lottery Experiment"
1998	Peak Practice	Jennifer Kemp	Season 6, Episode 5: "Another Day of Life"
1998	Heaven on Earth	Barbara Tucker	TV movie
1998–2003	EastEnders	Receptionist / Dr. Stokeley	Season 1: (6 episodes)
1999	The Lakes	Guest 2	Season 2, Episode 9
2000	Family Affairs	Doctor Morrisey	Unknown
2001–2011	Doctors	Helen Waterman / Dr. Sarah Reed / Ms. Reed	3 episodes
2002	Dinotopia	Teacher	TV mini-series
2006	Judge John Deed	Dr. Dolores Bleach	Season 5, Episode 5: "One Angry Man"
2008	Coronation Street	Doctor	Season 1: (3 episodes)
2008	Wire in the Blood	Magistrate	Season 6: (2 episodes)
2009	Law & Order: UK	Judge Katerina Rose	Season 2, Episode 1: "Samaritan"
2009	The Sarah Jane Adventures	Registrar	Season 3: (2 episodes)
2013	Wizards vs. Aliens	Tseringma	Season 2: (2 episodes)
