= SciFiNow =

British website and defunct magazine on speculative fiction

- Cover of the final issue (171), featuring Upload
- Editor: Rachael Harper
- Categories: Science fiction-related
- Frequency: 4 weekly
- Circulation: 44,000
- First issue: April 2007; 19 years ago
- Final issue Number: May 2020; 6 years ago (print publication only); 171
- Company: Harper Editorial
- Country: United Kingdom
- Language: English
- Website: scifinow.co.uk

SciFiNow was a British magazine formerly published every four weeks by Kelsey Media in the United Kingdom, covering the science fiction, fantasy and horror genres. It launched in April 2007, with the print publication ceasing in May 2020.

In 2010, SciFiNow won the Best Magazine award at the Fantasy Horror Award ceremony in Orvieto, Italy.

Kelsey Media acquired the title as the results of Future plc acquisition of previous owner Imagine Publishing in 2016. Future already owned competitor SFX and the company decided to divest SciFiNow a year later. Kelsey Media published the magazines until issue 171.

Following the print magazine's closure, SciFiNow transitioned to an online only media presence, publishing daily news, interviews, reviews and competitions covering films, TV shows, books and comics in the Science Fiction, Horror and Fantasy genres. In addition to the content on its own website, longer features and archival pieces from back issues are published under the brand-name "SciFiNow+" in the subscription-based website and app The Companion.

SciFiNow is now run under the ownership of Harper Editorial after a management buyout by editor Richard Harper.
