= Clifton Jones =

Jamaican actor (1937–2025)

- Jones in Space: 1999
- Born: 26 July 1937; St. Andrew, Colony of Jamaica
- Died: 4 June 2025 (aged 87)
- Occupation: Actor
- Years active: 1958–1994
- Television: Space: 1999

Clifton Jones (26 July 1937 – 4 June 2025) was a Jamaican actor known for his roles in British television.

== Life and career ==
Jones was born in St. Andrew, Jamaica on 26 July 1937.

He played the role of Jo's boyfriend in the original Theatre Workshop production of Shelagh Delaney's A Taste of Honey in 1958.

His first regular role was in Emergency Ward 10. He actually had an uncredited part in 1959. In 1961, he became a regular in the series as Dr Jeremiah Sanders. He appeared in the series for nearly one year. Another medical role saw him appear as Dr Ferguson in the comedy series Doctor in Charge.

His most prominent role is probably that of David Kano in the first season of the 1970s science fiction TV series Space: 1999.

Jones' other television credits include Dixon of Dock Green, Z-Cars, Public Eye, Danger Man, Man in a Suitcase, The Troubleshooters, The Persuaders!, The Onedin Line, Survivors, 1990, The Professionals, and two episodes of Star Trek: The Next Generation.

His film roles included appearances in The V.I.P.s (1963), Only When I Larf (1968), Decline and Fall... of a Birdwatcher (1968), Joanna (1968), Innocent Bystanders (1972), Father, Dear Father (1973), The Great McGonagall (1974) and Sheena (1984). He also voiced the character of Blackavar in the animated feature-film Watership Down (1978).

Jones died on 4 June 2025, at the age of 87.

== Partial filmography ==
- Life in Emergency Ward 10 (1959) — (uncredited)
- The V.I.P.s (1963) — Jamaican Passenger
- Only When I Larf (1968) — General Sakut
- Decline and Fall... of a Birdwatcher (1968) — Chokey
- Joanna (1968) — Black Detective
- The Breaking of Bumbo (1970) — Black Actor
- Innocent Bystanders (1972) — Hetherton
- Father, Dear Father (1973) — Larry
- The Great McGonagall (1975) — King Theebaw / Policeman / Clerk of the Court / Mr Stewart's Assistant / Zulu Chief / Ruffian / Fop
- Watership Down (1978) — Blackavar (voice)
- Sheena (1984) — King Jabalani
- China Moon (1994) — Dr. Ocampo
