= Anton Phillips =

Jamaican-born British actor (born 1943)

- Born: 31 October 1943 (age 82); Kingston, Jamaica
- Education: Rose Bruford College
- Occupation: Actor, theatre director
- Notable work: Space: 1999

Anton Phillips (born 31 October 1943) is a Jamaican-born British actor who found success appearing in British television. He remains best known for his role as Dr. Bob Mathias in the science fiction series Space: 1999. Also a theatre producer and director, he has been involved over the years with many initiatives to showcase high-quality professional theatre by and for black people, including the Carib Theatre Company, co-founded with Yvonne Brewster in 1980.

== Life and career ==
=== Early life and education ===
Anton Phillips was born in Kingston, Jamaica, and attended Manchester High School in Mandeville, Jamaica, before his family relocated to Washington, D.C., in the United States, where he graduated from high school. He then moved to the United Kingdom in the 1960s, and in 1969 attended Rose Bruford College drama school.

=== Work ===
After drama school, Phillips began an acting career in Britain that broke many racial barriers, appearing as the first black actor in many television series, including General Hospital, The Saint, The Bill, and becoming best known as a cast member of Space: 1999 (1975–77).

His professional life has been dedicated to the promotion of black theatre and to that end Phillips started a number of projects that significantly changed the profile of black and Asian theatre in Britain. These included the Carib Theatre Company (formed with Yvonne Brewster in 1980), the Black Theatre Season, and the Black Theatre Forum, initiatives that were responsible for giving opportunities to many black and Asian writers, actors and theatre technicians.

Under his direction, Carib Theatre's production of The Amen Corner by James Baldwin was the first black-produced and directed play to transfer to the West End of London, an important theatre area. Phillips directed a revival of the play, again at The Tricycle, in 1999.

Major productions have included Remembrance by Derek Walcott, and Sitting in Limbo — a play written by Phillips's then wife, actress Judy Hepburn (about Phyllis Coard and the Grenada Revolution), which played in London and toured to Jamaica. Carib Theatre also specialised in theatre in education, and toured schools across London for several years, playing to some 30,000 children.

The Black Theatre Season significantly changed the profile of black and Asian theater in Britain. Before the first season, which started in 1983 at the Arts Theatre in London's West End, black theatre was largely relegated to draughty church halls and rooms in community centres on the outskirts of cities. However, now black and Asian plays were presented in legitimate theatres with all their facilities of sound, light and comfort. As season followed season for seven years, companies, writers and actors were accorded prominence and respect within the profession and the wider society.

Phillips has also worked for the British Council in Ghana, where in 1994 he directed Trevor Rhone's Old Story Time as the first major production at the newly built National Theatre. Phillips also lectured at the School of Performing Arts, University of Ghana, and for three years was a consultant for the British Council on a special project in Tanzania to create a company of performers and teach them the principles and practice of theatre in education. He has directed in Germany, the Netherlands, and France. He has also managed a 60-strong company of singers, dancers, and musicians from South Africa on a touring tribute to Oliver Tambo that was presented at the Barbican Centre in London and at Salisbury Cathedral, England.

Inspired by the Area Youth Foundation of Kingston, Jamaica, Phillips founded the Stonebridge Area Youth Project (SAY), a performance-based project for disaffected young people between the ages of 14 and 24 based in Stonebridge, a London housing estate. Through performing arts workshops, SAY encouraged youths to re-engage with society by going back into education and learning life-skills to help them into employment. This project lasted for four years. He also directed Oliver Samuels, a Jamaican comic actor, in London's Blue Mountain Theatre for three years of plays that drew audiences of up to 3,000 at the Hammersmith Apollo theatre.

In 2008 Phillips performed Aimé Césaire's powerful epic poem Notebook of a Return to my Native Land, with music from Errol John, at the George Padmore Institute in London, as a tribute to Césaire.

In addition to being an actor, director and producer, Phillips has contributed to magazines and newspapers, usually writing about the state of black arts in the UK. Phillips was a contributor to the 2024 book Encounters with James Baldwin: Celebrating 100 Years. He has also produced the documentary film Home Sweet Harlesden, a collection of interviews with the first Caribbean immigrants to Britain.

Phillips was awarded the 2015 Edric Connor Trailblazer Award at the 10th Screen Nation Film and Television Awards.
