= Prentis Hancock =

British actor (1942–2025)

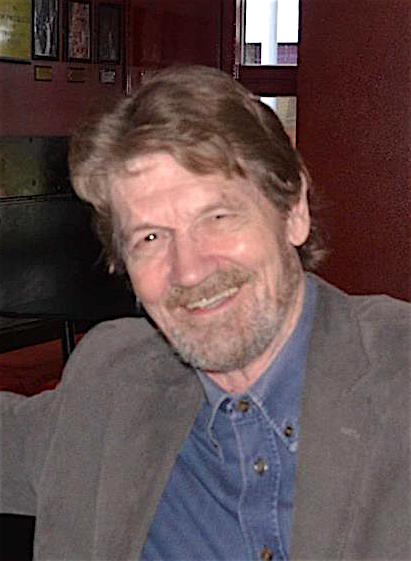
- Hancock in 2014
- Born: 14 May 1942; Glasgow, Lanarkshire, Scotland
- Died: 30 May 2025 (aged 83); Glasgow, Lanarkshire, Scotland
- Occupation: Actor
- Notable work: Space: 1999; Doctor Who

Prentis Hancock (14 May 1942 – 30 May 2025) was a British actor, best known for his television roles.

== Life and career ==
Hancock was born in Glasgow, Scotland on 14 May 1942. He was a regular cast member of the first season of science fiction series Space: 1999 as Paul Morrow, and also appeared in a number of Doctor Who stories throughout the 1970s – Spearhead from Space and Planet of the Daleks with Jon Pertwee, and Planet of Evil and The Ribos Operation with Tom Baker.

Other television appearances include Spy Trap, Z-Cars, Colditz, Survivors, The New Avengers, Secret Army, Return of the Saint, Minder, Chocky's Children, The Professionals and The Bill.

His film credits include The Thirty Nine Steps (1978) and Defence of the Realm (1985).

Hancock died in Glasgow on 30 May 2025, aged 83.

== Filmography ==
=== Television ===
- Space: 1999 (1975–1976)
- Doctor Who (1970, 1973, 1975, 1978)
- The Protectors (1973)
- Outlander (2014)

=== Film ===
- The Thirty Nine Steps (1978)

The Monster Club (1980)

- Defence of the Realm (1985)
