= The Day After Tomorrow (TV special) =

British science fiction television drama

- Opening titles, featuring "Into Infinity" subtitle
- Also known as: Into Infinity
- Genre: Science fiction
- Written by: Johnny Byrne
- Directed by: Charles Crichton
- Starring: Brian Blessed; Joanna Dunham; Nick Tate; Katharine Levy; Don Fellows
- Narrated by: Ed Bishop
- Composers: Derek Wadsworth; Steve Coe
- Country of origin: United Kingdom
- Original language: English

Production
- Producer: Gerry Anderson
- Cinematography: Frank Watts
- Editor: David Lane
- Running time: 47 minutes
- Production company: Gerry Anderson Productions
- Budget: £105,000

Original release
- Network: NBC
- Release: 9 December 1975
- Network: BBC1
- Release: 11 December 1976

The Day After Tomorrow (also known as Into Infinity in the United Kingdom) is a 1975 British science fiction television special produced by Gerry Anderson between the two series of Space: 1999. Written by Johnny Byrne and directed by Charles Crichton, it stars Brian Blessed, Joanna Dunham, Nick Tate, Katharine Levy and Martin Lev, with narration by Ed Bishop. Set in a future where environmental damage on Earth threatens the survival of humanity, The Day After Tomorrow follows the interstellar mission of Altares, a science vessel that uses photon energy to travel at the speed of light. After leaving the Solar System and reaching Alpha Centauri, their primary destination, the crew of Altares push deeper into space; there, they encounter phenomena including a meteor shower, a red giant and, finally, a black hole, which pulls the ship into another universe.

Originally commissioned to produce a child-friendly introduction to Albert Einstein's theory of special relativity, Anderson and Byrne conceived The Day After Tomorrow as a pilot for a TV series, with the episode title "Into Infinity". Anderson was ultimately unable to raise funding for additional episodes, making the pilot a standalone special. With a cast and crew that included veterans of earlier Anderson productions, The Day After Tomorrow was filmed between July and September 1975; this comprised 10 days' principal photography and six weeks' special effects shooting. The visual style of Space: 1999 provided inspiration to both effects artist Martin Bower, who built the scale models, and production designer Reg Hill, who recycled sets from Space: 1999 to create the Altares interiors. The theme music was composed by newcomer Derek Wadsworth.

The Day After Tomorrow was first broadcast in the United States in December 1975 as the third episode of NBC's after-school series Special Treat. In the UK, it was transmitted on BBC1 as a special, first in December 1976 and again in December 1977; a re-edited version aired on BBC Four in November 2014. Critical responses to The Day After Tomorrow have been mixed: while its model effects and music have been praised, it has divided opinion with its "psychedelic" images, which have been compared to the visual style of film director Stanley Kubrick. In addition, the story has been criticised for lacking suspense due to the fact that it was devised primarily to educate, rather than entertain. A novelisation by Douglas R. Mason was cancelled after the planned TV series failed to appear; a new novelisation by Gregory L. Norris was published in 2017.

== Plot ==
In the future, human survival is threatened by rising pollution, environmental damage and depletion of the Earth's natural resources. A narrator (Ed Bishop) introduces the science vessel Altares as the first spacecraft to "harness the limitless power of the photon". This allows it to move at the speed of light, potentially causing "effects predicted by Einstein's theory of relativity – effects that could shrink the very fabric of space, distort time, and perhaps alter the structure of the universe as we understand it."

Altares and a crew of five are due to depart Space Station Delta for Alpha Centauri to seek out Earth-like planets for colonisation. As astronauts travelling at light speed age more slowly than their families on Earth, the crew is made up of two "family units": Captain Harry Masters and his daughter Jane, and Doctors Tom and Anna Bowen and their son David. The Bowens arrive in a United Nations shuttle and transfer to Altares. After Jane leaves her dog, Spring, in the care of station commander Jim Forbes, Captain Masters pilots Altares away from the station and activates the photon drive, beginning the ship's 4.3-light-year journey to Alpha Centauri. As Altares leaves the Solar System, Jane and David observe how Pluto turns blue, then red, due to the shortening and lengthening of light waves caused by the Doppler effect.

Arriving at Alpha Centauri, the crew launch a series of satellites to transmit data back to Earth. Having completed their primary objective, they agree to push deeper into space. When Altares encounters a star cluster, Anna tells Jane of Einstein's discoveries in special relativity and unified field theory. Shortly after, the ship is hit by a meteor shower that damages key systems and causes the photon drive to re-activate, sending the ship hurtling through space at incredible speed and knocking the crew unconscious. A fail-safe halts the ship within the gravitational field of a red giant on the brink of supernova. Captain Masters dons a heat suit and enters the reactor core in a dangerous bid to repair the photon drive by hand. He succeeds, and Anna and Jane pilot the ship away from the star before it explodes.

After detecting a signal from Delta, the travellers are able to calculate their position and set a course for Earth. However, disaster strikes when Altares is caught in the pull of a black hole. Although the ship cannot reach the faster-than-light speeds needed to break free, Anna believes that the hole may lead to another universe and urges her companions not to give up hope. Crossing the event horizon, the travellers experience mind-bending spacetime distortions. They emerge on the other side of the hole safe and well, albeit unable to return home. As Altares approaches an unknown planet, the narrator concludes: "One thing is sure – this is not the final word. Not the end, but the beginning. A new universe, a new hope? Only time will tell."

== Cast ==
- Brian Blessed as Dr Tom Bowen
- Joanna Dunham as Dr Anna Bowen
- Nick Tate as Captain Harry Masters
- Katharine Levy as Jane Masters
- Martin Lev as David Bowen
- Don Fellows as Commander Jim Forbes
- Ed Bishop as The Narrator
- Bones the Dog as Spring

== Production ==
I wanted young people to watch this film on television and find it exciting enough that, in the course of viewing the programme, they would be able to acquire an understanding of Einstein's theory of relativity. When the teacher wrote E = mc^{2} on the board, I wanted the young viewer to recall the programme and say, "Yeah, I saw a programme about that. I want to learn more about it," instead of, "It's just one more thing I have to memorise and what good is it gonna do me?"

— George Heinemann on the inspiration

After filming on the first series of Space: 1999 came to an end in the spring of 1975, producer Gerry Anderson was contacted by NBC executive George Heinemann with an idea for an educational science fiction TV series. This would comprise seven one-hour episodes designed to teach children science in the form of an action-adventure. NBC intended to promote the series by distributing information leaflets to schools. To launch the series, Heinemann commissioned Anderson to produce an episode about Albert Einstein's theory of special relativity, which holds that the speed of light cannot be exceeded and remains constant whether an object is still or moving.

By 1975, Anderson's production company, Group Three, had received no assurance from distributor ITC Entertainment that it would order a second series of Space: 1999. Faced with the prospect of cancellation, Anderson and Space: 1999 story editor Johnny Byrne conceived Heinemann's episode, which they had named "Into Infinity", as a pilot for a new series, provisionally titled The Day After Tomorrow. Anderson was ultimately unable to secure the funding needed to make further episodes, leaving "Into Infinity" – now more commonly known by the series title – as a one-off special.

=== Writing ===
Anderson's preparations included researching Einstein's work; he later said that he had not understood any of the theories and suggested that some of Einstein's ideas are essentially impossible to demonstrate on TV. Byrne wrote the script, which instructed that the equation E = mc^{2} – Einstein's formula that relates mass to energy – should appear on screen at intervals. According to Anderson, the writing process was "extremely difficult" as it was a challenge to "get over in a few words the problems of time changes that affect long-distance travel. You also have to do it in a language that young people can comprehend."

Gerry said to me "Could [I] do a story for school kids?" and I said "No problem." I went into my office and wrote a little thing that took the principle of a ship travelling at the speed of light and put a family in it – so by not leaving them separated meant they wouldn't age at different rates because of the dilation effect. Gerry read it over the phone and we got the go-ahead straight away.

— Johnny Byrne on the premise

Byrne – who, like Anderson, had no scientific background – found the central concept hard to grasp: "Once I got the go-ahead I suddenly realised I knew very little about the theory of relativity ... I went out and read Relativity for the Layman, and realised I was in deep trouble because there were so many aspects of it." Struggling with the plot, Anderson and Byrne engaged Professor John G. Taylor of the University of London, an expert on black holes, as a scientific adviser. However, according to Byrne, "there wasn't an awful lot [Taylor] could do. In the end the story simplified itself down by necessity. I gave an illustration of the Doppler shift, and gave an idea of how planets destroy themselves, and how they can become a black hole. Then we tried to duplicate the effect of sending people into the black hole."

Despite the focus on relativity, the special also discusses time dilation: an effect whereby time decelerates at a rate proportional to an object's acceleration. For the crew of Altares, which travels at light speed, the journey to Alpha Centauri takes only a few years; during this time, whole decades pass on Earth. Recognising that the child characters Jane and David would serve to represent the young audience's curiosity and ask questions on its behalf, Heinemann wanted them to be "just like real children" rather than "[coming] across like kids do on Saturday morning programmes." Byrne wrote the dialogue in such a way that the characters give only partial explanations of the phenomena they encounter, the aim being to encourage the audience to study the topics in their own time and develop their researching skills.

=== Casting ===
Most of the cast had appeared in earlier Anderson productions. Nick Tate had played regular character Alan Carter in Space: 1999, while Brian Blessed and Joanna Dunham had both appeared as guest characters on the same series – Blessed in the episode "Death's Other Dominion", Dunham in "Missing Link". The credits billed Blessed first, Dunham second and Tate third. Don Fellows had played an uncredited role in Space: 1999's first episode, "Breakaway". Ed Bishop had voiced Captain Blue in the puppet series Captain Scarlet and the Mysterons before taking on the role of Ed Straker in Anderson's first live-action series, UFO.

Neither Katharine Levy nor Martin Lev had significant acting experience, though the filming at Pinewood Studios coincided with that of Bugsy Malone, in which Lev played the role of Dandy Dan. The Masters' dog, Spring, was played by Byrne's terrier, Bones.

=== Design ===
Inspired by designs used in Space: 1999, special effects artist Martin Bower built a six-foot-long (1.8 m) scale model of Altares (shown here above Space Station Delta). His work has been praised.

The production was budgeted at £105,000 (about £816,000 in 2025). In the absence of Bob Bell and Keith Wilson, who were working on The New Avengers and Star Maidens, Anderson's business partner Reg Hill assumed the role of production designer. The Altares interiors were the first sets that Hill had designed for Anderson since the production of Fireball XL5 more than a decade earlier. They were built from parts of the Ultra Probe set originally made for the Space: 1999 episode "Dragon's Domain", along with design elements from other episodes. Other sets and props were also recycled from the earlier series.

The scale models of Altares were designed and built by uncredited model-maker Martin Bower, who took inspiration from the various spaceships that had appeared in Space: 1999 and was initially under the impression that his work was to appear in that series. A three-foot-long (0.91 m) model was used for long shots; close-ups used a larger, six-foot (1.8 m) version, which was fitted with a powerful light for the photon drive as well as freon gas-powered jets to simulate exhaust. The 10-foot-wide (3.0 m) Space Station Delta model was adapted from the SS Daria model that had appeared in "Mission of the Darians". Some of props that were newly made for the special would re-appear in Space: 1999's second series.

=== Filming ===
Filming began on 21 July 1975 under production code number "DAT 1". Principal photography was conducted at Pinewood Studios and completed in ten days, ending on 1 August. This was followed by six weeks of special effects shooting at Bray Studios. Post-production continued until October.

The special was directed by Charles Crichton, who had directed eight episodes of Space: 1999. Other members of the crew – including cinematographer Frank Watts, effects director Brian Johnson, effects lighting cameraman Nick Allder and editor David Lane – had also worked on the series. As Anderson's regular composer Barry Gray had other commitments, newcomer Derek Wadsworth was contracted to produce the theme and incidental music (the latter in collaboration with Steve Coe). Wadsworth would later be appointed composer for the second series of Space: 1999, replacing Gray.

Like the title sequences of Anderson's earlier productions, The Day After Tomorrow opens with a fast-paced montage of action shots from later in the episode, giving a preview of the story to come.

== Broadcast ==
The Day After Tomorrow was first broadcast in the United States on 9 December 1975 as the third episode of the NBC anthology series Special Treat. In the UK, it was first shown on 11 December 1976 on BBC1. In the original cut, the opening scenes showed two titles: the series title, The Day After Tomorrow, superimposed on a starfield, followed by the episode title, "Into Infinity", on a model shot of the lift transferring the Masters and Bowen families from Space Station Delta to Altares. As it would be transmitting the programme as a special, rather than an episode of a series, the BBC edited the title sequence to remove the series title, believing that the appearance of two titles would confuse the audience. (In any case, deleting the episode title would have been more difficult as the lift shot was dynamic and had multiple elements.) Consequently, the special was listed in Radio Times and other press as Into Infinity.

The special was repeated on BBC1 on 6 December 1977. In 1997, the BBC deleted the master tape from its archives but retained an edited copy for future repeats. The same year, clips from The Day After Tomorrow and the Space: 1999 episode "Black Sun" were featured in "Black Holes", an instalment of the Channel 4 documentary series Equinox. On 9 November 2014, the special was repeated on BBC Four under the title The Day after Tomorrow: Into Infinity. It was introduced by Professor Brian Cox of the University of Manchester, who stated that he had been a fan of the special since he was a child and praised its scientific accuracy.

== Reception ==
The premise is a good one, offering scope for a potential series, although it lacks the originality of previous Anderson series and is perhaps too close to Lost in Space in that it features a family crew with a malfunctioning spaceship (but without the robot and talking carrot).

— Vincent Law

The Day After Tomorrow has attracted a range of comment on its writing, design and effects, as well as the performances of its cast. Some critics have compared the premise to that of Lost in Space or Stanley Kubrick's 2001: A Space Odyssey, and view the special effects as an imitation of the latter.

In a review for TV Zone magazine published in 2002, Andrew Pixley praised the acting, music and direction, commenting that the programme "oozes with the charm associated with the golden era of Anderson." However, he added that the premise "falls flat. Rather than making physics a palatable piece of escapist hokum, the format is dragged down to the level of a scantily-illustrated physics textbook ... something isn't quite right." Elizabeth Howell, a science journalist, believes that The Day After Tomorrow is remarkable for its depiction of space exploration "in the colonisation sense, rather than Star Wars and its descendants who show space as a spot to be conquered." She further comments that the themes are "strangely timeless ... the true, unknown part hits you at the very end." Chris Bentley, author of The Complete Gerry Anderson: The Authorised Episode Guide, draws parallels with the Fireball XL5 episode "Faster Than Light", whose plot concerns the problems encountered by the crew of spacecraft travelling at light speed.

Altares is stranded in another universe. Reaction to the special effects has been mixed, drawing comparisons to the work of Stanley Kubrick, while one commentator has called the repeated appearances of the equation E = mc^{2} confusing.

In a review for Anderson fanzine Andersonic, Vincent Law describes The Day After Tomorrow as an "oddity" and "uncharacteristically lacklustre" by Anderson's standards, stating that while the special "cracks along at a fair old pace", its educational aspects inhibit the story and characterisation. He argues that Jane is the only character who develops over the course of the plot; meanwhile, the adults are "pretty much peripheral" and David is essentially a "miniature Spock". Law also criticises the narration, remarking that Bishop occasionally sounds "like a presenter of one of those old schools programmes from the '70s, just imparting a string of dry facts." He believes the quality of the design and effects to be lower than that of Space: 1999, praising the miniature model work but suggesting that some of the effects are "more in keeping with Blake's 7". He also regards the "info dump" introduction as a weak imitation of the Space: 1999 opening titles and argues that the repeated appearances of the mass–energy equivalence equation, E = mc^{2}, only confuse the audience. According to Law, the plot about an accident-prone spaceship reflects shifting public attitudes to space exploration during the 1970s, a time "when optimism in the space programme was on the wane". He considers the special to have aged poorly, noting that while Altares is presented as a "lightship" of the future, some of the on-board equipment resembles 20th-century devices such as slide rules and punched cards.

John Kenneth Muir praises the "lyrical" script, "stunning" photography and "top-notch" effects. Calling The Day After Tomorrow a "high-tech, science-minded update of the whole Lost in Space format", he comments that its plot mixes action with "psychedelic" moments like the fall into the black hole ("a Kubrickian wonder, a montage dominated by double images, slow-motion photography and the use of a creepy distortion lens. Pretty powerful stuff for a kids' show.") Law regards the faster-than-light travel shots as the best effects, negatively comparing the black hole sequence to the ending of 2001: A Space Odyssey: "Kubrick's Star-Gate it is not." He also describes the special as "less minimalist ... in colour and costume" than the first series of Space: 1999, believing that elements like Wadsworth's "hard-hitting, hard-driving" score liven up the proceedings.

Despite the mostly cold and inexpressive characters, lack of dramatic conflict, or really, even much of a narrative, Into Infinity is still entertaining. The sets are convincing (if familiar), the design of the Altares is fantastic, and the passage through the black hole is appropriately psychedelic.

— Christopher Mills

Science fiction writer and critic Christopher Mills likens the special to a 2001 "for kids", noting that the plot features "wonky pseudo-science and insanely improbable coincidences". He considers the slow-motion fall into the black hole "a bit of a hoot", criticising the actors' exaggerated body movements. Mills also expresses surprise at "how 'British' ... the characters [are], facing each new peril with remarkable calm and 'stiff upper lip' stoicism ... they're apparently so resigned to being jerked around by the universe that they just hold hands and calmly await their fate." He sums up The Day After Tomorrow as a "solid little piece of '70s juvenile sci-fi" that is perhaps "not quite as 'scientifically accurate' as it pretends to be, but fun".

Muir describes the special as a "time capsule of once-state-of-the-art science fiction". For Law, it is a "half-forgotten experiment" of interest only to dedicated Anderson fans, but also provides "an interesting look at what might have been" had Anderson gone on to make a full series. David Hirsch of Starlog magazine suggests that the lack of interest from TV networks in funding a series may have been due to the fact that the special's first appearance preceded the release of Star Wars (1977), which triggered a renewal of the science fiction genre. Richard Houldsworth of TV Zone attributes the special's failure as a TV pilot to ITC's decision to order a second series of Space: 1999: "As Anderson concentrated on making 1999 'bigger, better and more exciting than ever', Into Infinity just got swallowed up in its own black hole, and stayed there."

== Other media ==
Douglas R. Mason, an author of several Space: 1999 novels, wrote a novelisation of the special for Futurama Publications. As The Day After Tomorrow was conceived as a pilot, Futurama intended Mason's book to be the first in a series. However, when it became apparent that no further episodes would be made, Futurama cancelled the novelisation, which to date remains unpublished. In 2017, a new novelisation by Gregory L. Norris was published by Anderson Entertainment, followed by a sequel in 2019.

The special has been rated "U" by the British Board of Film Classification since 1997. In 2002, a DVD of The Day After Tomorrow and Star Laws, Anderson's 1986 pilot for a series that would later be made as Space Precinct, was released by Fanderson as part of its members-only merchandise range. In 2015, the special was re-issued on DVD as part of the compilation release "The Lost Worlds of Gerry Anderson" by Network Distributing.

In early 2024, Anderson Entertainment released a remastered version on Blu-ray. As the original film elements are long lost, the Blu-ray was created using AI upscaling with colour correction.

== See also ==
- 1975 in British television
- Albert Einstein in popular culture
- Space stations and habitats in fiction
- Stars in fiction
