= The Last Enemy (Space: 1999) =

- Space: 1999 episode
- Episode no.: Series 1 Episode 6
- Directed by: Bob Kellett
- Written by: Bob Kellett
- Editing by: Derek Hyde Chambers
- Production code: SP 18
- Original air date: 9 December 1975

Guest appearances
- Caroline Mortimer as Dione; Maxine Audley as Commissioner Theia; Kevin Stoney as Supreme Commander Talos; Carolyn Courage as 1st Bethan Woman; Linda Hooks as 2nd Bethan Woman; Tara Faraday as 3rd Bethan Woman; John Lee-Barber as Eagle 5 Astronaut; Alan Bennion as Male Bethan

Episode chronology
← Previous "The Testament of Arkadia"	Next → "Mission of the Darians"

"The Last Enemy" is the sixth episode of the first series of Space: 1999. The screenplay was written by Bob Kellett (with additional material contributed by Johnny Byrne); Kellett also directed. Working titles included "The Second Sex" and "The Other Enemy".

The final shooting script is dated 25 October 1974. Live-action filming took place Friday 8 November 1974 through Tuesday 19 November 1974. A three-day re-mount was scheduled from Tuesday 25 February 1975 through Thursday 28 February 1975. This re-mount concluded the filming of the first series.

The episode was first broadcast on 9 December 1975 in the United States and 19 February 1976 in the UK.

== Plot ==
The Moon is crossing a solar system containing twin inhabited planets, Betha and Delta, which lie on opposite sides of their star. On Moonbase Alpha, Professor Bergman confirms that the orbits are such that each planet is always hidden from the other.

On Betha, military leader Dione observes the Moon. Her female superior, Theia, reports that Betha's ruling council has decided on a pre-emptive strike and orders Dione to launch her warship, Satazius. Travelling to the Moon, the all-female crew remotely disable Alpha's key systems before the base can defend itself. Landing nearby, they deploy a multi-barrelled missile launcher that appears to take aim at Alpha – only to fire on Delta, which immediately retaliates with unguided missiles. One of them hits Satazius, crippling the ship. Bergman surmises that the Moon has become a battlefield for two warring worlds, neither of which can see the other; any ground-launched weapons would fall into the star.

Activating an escape pod, Dione abandons Satazius and lands at Alpha, seeking refuge. She explains her mission: use the Moon as a platform to launch a surprise attack on Delta – which evidently, the Deltans were prepared for. A Deltan warship arrives and fires on Betha, which responds in kind. A Bethan missile destroys the Deltan vessel. Commander Koenig uses the stalemate to propose a ceasefire, and three-way communication is set up between Alpha, Theia, and the Deltan leader, a man called Talos. As negotiations commence, it becomes clear this is a literal "battle of the sexes" between male- and female-dominated societies. Eventually Talos and Theia agree a truce. Koenig hopes that it lasts until the Moon moves out of missile range.

Dione uses mental powers to teleport herself to her pod and return to Satazius, whose crew are unhurt. Over radio, she reveals her deception: the "damage" to the ship was caused by a controlled explosion. She resumes bombarding Delta's missile bases. Koenig informs Talos of the betrayal. Firing more salvos at the Moon, Talos threatens to destroy Alpha unless Koenig gives him the target coordinates for Satazius. Dione warns Koenig that if he complies, she will destroy Alpha.

Koenig offers to meet Dione on Satazius. The Bethans see a Moon buggy with a single space-suited occupant leaving Alpha. Over radio, Koenig demands shelter on Satazius, but Dione tells him to turn back. Koenig orders her to stop her attack first, but she refuses. Koenig cryptically remarks that, if this is her final decision, she has only herself to blame. The driver's helmet slips off, revealing that the spacesuit is empty. With Koenig safe on Alpha, the remote-controlled buggy collides with Satazius, detonating the buggy's payload of nuclear ordnance and destroying the ship. Delta ceases firing on the Moon.

As the Moon leaves the system, Bergman expresses hope that Betha and Delta will one day be at peace. Dr Russell says that she would rather take her chances drifting through space than live under a permanent state of war.

== Regular cast ==
- Martin Landau as Commander John Koenig
- Barbara Bain as Dr Helena Russell
- Barry Morse as Professor Victor Bergman
- Prentis Hancock as Controller Paul Morrow
- Clifton Jones as David Kano
- Zienia Merton as Sandra Benes
- Anton Phillips as Dr Bob Mathias
- Nick Tate as Captain Alan Carter
- Suzanne Roquette as Tanya Alexander (uncredited)

== Production ==
The original idea for this 'battle of the sexes' corollary reportedly came from series star Barbara Bain. Writer/director Bob Kellett gave the concept a science-fiction twist in his only credited writing contribution to the programme with the age-old conflict between men and women carried out with space-age warfare. The original title, "The Second Sex", is an obvious reference to Simone de Beauvoir's 1949 book of the same name.

The final cut ran short, prompting script editor Johnny Byrne to write several new scenes and re-work others already shot to extend the episode to the required fifty minutes. All scenes on Satazius were part of the re-mount, as was Dione's visit to Sandra's quarters. Footage was added to nearly all the Main Mission scenes involving Dione. The ending was greatly extended with the last-minute addition of Koenig's plan to either convince Dione to cease fire or destroy her should she refuse. Originally, Koenig revealed Dione's coordinates and watched as a Deltan missile destroyed her.

Guest artist Alan Bennion, better known for his appearances in Doctor Who as the Ice Warrior Commanders Slaar ("The Seeds of Death"), Izlyr ("The Curse of Peladon") and Azaxyr ("The Monster of Peladon"), was filmed as a male Bethan subordinate conferring with Dione, but his dialogue was reworked and given to Maxine Audley's character Theia for the re-mount.

Ironically, several segments originally filmed were dropped: (1) A scene in which Bergman and Helena express their anxiety as the first gunship approaches Alpha: Bergman states that tension makes him cheerful and chatty and Helena congratulates him for suffering from 'Lyle's Syndrome'. (2) Koenig ordering the Alphans to board the Eagles and stand by to fly to Betha in the event of a missile hit on Main Mission and subsequent shots of people boarding the ships and the ships standing by in the maintenance hangar.

An insight into the close relationship between the male- and female-dominated societies would have been provided with the visual effects: the gunships of both planets were originally intended to be the same model with two different paint colours. Taking into account that many British households in the early 1970s did not have a colour television and most viewers would not be able to discern any difference, this idea was dropped and the Martin Bower "Alpha Child"/"War Games" battleship was altered to portray the Deltan gunship.

=== Music ===
In addition to the regular Barry Gray score—drawn primarily from "Breakaway" and "Another Time, Another Place" — Georges Teperino's composition 'Cosmic Sounds No. 3' (previously heard in "Force of Life") was used as atmosphere during the Dione-on-Betha scenes; played at a slower speed, it gave the women's planet an ethereal quality.

== Reception ==
John Kenneth Muir praised the episode, calling it "splendid television on all fronts". He found the premise "gripping", the model effects "fantastically detailed" and the climax "well acted and memorable". He considered the episode "far more credible than 1999's other war story, 'War Games'", in which the attacks on Alpha are merely an illusion.

Calling the episode a "typical" instalment from Space: 1999 Series 1, Dreamwatch Bulletin criticised the presentation of the Bethans and Deltans as well as Koenig's role. It added that although the episode is "low on plot, there are enough flashes and bangs to keep the techno freaks happy."

TV Zone magazine praised the writing, the direction, and Mortimer's performance. SFX gave the episode a C rating, calling it a "fairly standard" entry with a predictable betrayal by Mortimer's character, but still "entertaining enough". SciFiNow rated it 3 out of 5.

Video Watchdog was critical, describing the episode as "silly and wholly predictable". The reviewer further characterised it as "another episode where logic conveniently goes missing whenever the author writes himself into a corner."

== Novelisation ==
The episode was adapted in the fifth Year One Space: 1999 novel Lunar Attack by John Rankine, published in 1975. The adaptation was drawn exclusively from the final shooting script, dated 25 October 1974; none of the re-mounted material from February 1975 was included.
