= End of Eternity (Space: 1999) =

- Space: 1999 episode
- Episode no.: Series 1 Episode 11
- Directed by: Ray Austin
- Written by: Johnny Byrne
- Cinematography by: Frank Watts
- Editing by: Derek Hyde Chambers
- Production code: SP 16
- Original air date: 15 November 1975

Guest appearances
- Peter Bowles as Balor; James Smillie as Mike Baxter; Vincent Wong as Dr Fujita; Martin Grace and Colin Skeaping as Security Guards; Annie Lambert and Andy Sutcliffe as Alphans

Episode chronology
← Previous "War Games"	Next → "The Full Circle"

"End of Eternity" is the 11th episode of the first series of Space: 1999, a 1970s British science fiction television series produced by Group Three for ITC Entertainment. Written by Johnny Byrne and directed by Ray Austin, it was the 16th episode to be produced and was filmed at Pinewood Studios in October 1974.

Opening in 1999, the series follows the crew of lunar colony Moonbase Alpha after a nuclear explosion pushes the Moon out of Earth orbit and into interstellar space. Unable to control the rogue planet's trajectory, the Alphans encounter various astronomical phenomena and alien civilisations as they search for a way back to Earth or a new world to settle on. In "End of Eternity", the Alphans encounter an immortal alien (played by Peter Bowles) who torments them for his amusement.

The episode first aired on 15 November 1975 in the United States. Although it was disliked by Byrne, it received largely positive reviews from critics. Bowles' performance divided opinion.

== Plot ==
An Eagle crew conducts a survey of a passing asteroid. Sensors detect an underground cavity which appears to have a breathable atmosphere. The Alphans set off explosives, revealing the outer hatch of an airlock. Once inside, they attempt to cut through the inner door using laser equipment. The door suddenly explodes outwards, stunning Eagle pilot Mike Baxter. In the chamber beyond lies a male humanoid, seriously wounded in the blast. He is evacuated to Moonbase Alpha but declared dead on arrival in Medical. Baxter is found to have suffered optic nerve damage, putting an end to his piloting career.

The alien mysteriously returns to life, unconscious but no longer showing any signs of injury. Dr Russell reports that his cells heal at an incredible rate, making him virtually indestructible. While testing rock samples from the survey, Professor Bergman discovers the asteroid can also regenerate: although its fragments disappear under antimatter bombardment, they quickly rematerialise. Bergman speculates the asteroid could be an unknown form of life.

The alien wakes up and breaks out of Medical, displaying phenomenal strength while knocking out a pair of security guards. He is invulnerable to laser weapons, even ones set to kill. However, he stands down when confronted by Koenig and Captain Carter. Explaining that he was acting in self-defence because of his earlier injuries, he introduces himself as Balor, a scientist from the planet Progron. His people were masters of cell regeneration, experimenting on themselves until they were able to halt the ageing process and become functionally immortal. This caused the Progrons to grow apathetic and corrupt until their society collapsed. Reasoning that his people needed to embrace death again, Balor tried to reverse the experiments, but the other Progrons turned on him and imprisoned him in the asteroid, where he has remained for 1000 years. Although he grants Balor sanctuary on Alpha, Koenig wonders why a civilisation so advanced would impose so cruel a punishment, suspecting Balor is hiding something.

Entering Baxter's quarters, Balor uses a psychic ability to place the pilot in a state of murderous elation. When Koenig stops by, Baxter laughingly beats him with a miniature model biplane, then falls to the floor dead. Balor uses his powers to heal Koenig's wounds. The Commander's fears are realised when the psychopathic Balor, overthrown tyrant of Progron, says he will dominate and terrorise the Alphans. When Koenig refuses to submit, Balor begins rampaging through Alpha. He destroys equipment and kills a Medical orderly.

The senior staff plan to eliminate Balor by isolating him in one of the sections and depressurising it. Koenig removes the signs from an airlock, then lures Balor inside. After a violent struggle, Balor throws Koenig clear of the airlock, allowing Controller Morrow to close the inner hatch and eject Balor into space. The Alphans use an Eagle's laser weapons to blow up the asteroid. Koenig, Russell and Bergman are aware that when they freed Balor, they inadvertently defeated Progron justice. Though tempted by the gift of immortality, Koenig is in no doubt it came at too high a price.

As the Moon pushes on into space, the asteroid rematerialises.

== Regular cast ==
- Martin Landau as Commander John Koenig
- Barbara Bain as Dr Helena Russell
- Barry Morse as Professor Victor Bergman
- Prentis Hancock as Controller Paul Morrow
- Clifton Jones as David Kano
- Zienia Merton as Sandra Benes
- Anton Phillips as Dr Bob Mathias
- Nick Tate as Captain Alan Carter
- Suzanne Roquette as Tanya Alexander

== Production and broadcast ==
"End of Eternity" was written by Johnny Byrne, one of the series' script editors. Byrne named the villain for Balor (or Balar), an evil god in Irish mythology, as well as for the Phoenician deity Baal.

The episode was filmed over 12 days between 9 and 28 October 1974. It was the first acting job for Andy Sutcliffe, a former racing driver, who plays an unnamed operative in Main Mission. The fight scenes were arranged by Alf Joint, the stunt double for Peter Bowles. The scene showing Balor's escape from Medical was filmed on 21 October. The incidental music included library tracks by composers including Robert Farnon, Roger Roger and David Snell.

By 21 January 1975, the episode had been completed. Prior to transmission, the scene of Baxter's assault on Koenig was cut to remove shots of Koenig lying bloodied and unconscious on the floor, as these were thought to be too explicit for a family-friendly timeslot.

"End of Eternity" was first transmitted in the UK on 20 November 1975 by Associated Television. It had previously aired in the United States on 15 and 18 November.

== Reception ==
"End of Eternity" was disliked by its writer but received mostly positive reviews from critics. It is considered by some commentators, including John Kenneth Muir and TV Zone magazine, to be one of the series' best episodes. TV Zone praised Byrne's "absorbing and adult" script and Austin's "quite brilliant direction"; it called the result "something of a classic". SFX magazine gave the episode an "A" grade, describing it as "genuinely frightening and harrowing", while SciFiNow rated it 4 out of 5. In contrast, DreamWatch Bulletin gave 5 out of 10, finding the episode poorly directed. Video Watchdog considered the ending weak, but found the incidental music more original than that of other episodes. It also called Austin's direction "more aggressive and imaginative" than before.

In interviews, Byrne remembered the episode as "not one of my favourite stories". Noting that it is set largely within Moonbase Alpha, he added that the plot needed "opening out onto another landscape. I felt it was too claustrophobic and confined." He also said the story lost believability in its second half and the villain was "very one-dimensional", requiring "a higher purpose than simply the urge to indulge in mindless killing."

Byrne and DreamWatch Bulletin thought Bowles' casting was a mistake. Byrne considered the actor "very competent, but wrong for the part", while the magazine found him "totally miscast", adding that his costume (with black platform shoes and bell-bottoms) left him "looking like Noddy Holder at a funeral". Other commentators praised Bowles' role. Fred McNamara wrote that he "excels" as Balor and provides one of Space: 1999's "most enjoyably devilish performances". Muir described the character as "probably the most memorable" of the series' alien villains. SFX called Bowles outstanding despite his character's "outrageous flares and wedge shoes".

Muir noted "classical references" in the episode, writing that Balor's mention of being "cast out" from Progron "makes for a good Milton-like Lucifer analogy", while Koenig's struggle with Balor echoes the story of David and Goliath. He complimented "End of Eternity" for its "revealing production design" and "stylistic editing", calling the overall episode "a near-perfect blend of cinematic visual style with a thoughtful science fiction premise". He especially liked the use of low camera angles to make Balor look more imposing, as well as the point-of-view shots and "shock cutting" employed for Baxter's assault on Koenig. Muir also praised the "suspenseful" amplifying or muting of sound effects. For example, he pointed out that Balor's revival is dominated by the noise of his heartbeat, while scenes of the character attacking the Alphans feature no sound except incidental music, emphasising his "otherworldliness". TV Zone found these scenes "particularly unnerving".

According to Henry Keazor, "End of Eternity", like the earlier episode "Death's Other Dominion", signals a moral rejection of immortality; instead, it presents death "as a necessity for understanding life". Noting that in "Death's Other Dominion" Koenig asks whether death "gives a meaning to life", Keazor observes that the question is "indirectly answered" in "End of Eternity" when Balor says he instructed the immortal Progrons to remember that "only death gives a purpose to life [...] But how can you value life, if you do not fear death?"
