= The Immunity Syndrome =

The Immunity Syndrome may refer to:

- "The Immunity Syndrome" (Space: 1999), a 1977 episode of Space: 1999
- "The Immunity Syndrome" (Star Trek), a 1968 second-season episode of Star Trek: The Original Series
