= Collision Course (Space: 1999) =

- Space: 1999 episode
- Episode no.: Series 1 Episode 14
- Directed by: Ray Austin
- Written by: Anthony Terpiloff
- Editing by: Alan Killick
- Production code: SP 13
- Original air date: 4 August 1975

Guest appearances
- Margaret Leighton as Arra; Sarah Bullen as Kate; Annie Lambert as Operative Julie; Alf Joint as Balcony Jumping Man

Episode chronology
← Previous "Death's Other Dominion"	Next → "Voyager's Return"

"Collision Course" is the 14th episode of the first series of Space: 1999. The screenplay was written by Anthony Terpiloff; the director was Ray Austin. The final shooting script is dated 13 August 1974. Live-action filming took place Tuesday 27 August 1974 through Tuesday 10 September 1974.

The episode first aired on 4 August 1975 in Australia and 18 September 1975 in the UK.

== Plot ==
An asteroid is on a collision course with the Moon. As Moonbase Alpha is within the impact zone, the Alphans devise a plan to blow up the asteroid using nuclear ordnance. The Eagle squadron place charges at strategic points on the asteroid's surface. Due to a malfunction of his Eagle, Captain Carter fails to deliver his charge on time and the other charges detonate with his Eagle inside the blast radius. The Eagle survives but Carter is left insensate.

Although the asteroid has been destroyed, radio interference from the debris cloud makes it impossible to contact Carter. Commander Koenig refuses to believe he is dead and departs Alpha in a rescue Eagle. Professor Bergman reports that the field is emitting an unknown and potentially lethal form of radiation, but Koenig disregards the warning.

Guided by a disembodied female voice, Koenig and Carter manage to locate each other and navigate back to Alpha. Suddenly a planet appears out of nowhere, moving towards the Moon. After dropping Carter off at Medical, Koenig is informed that the planet, which is marginally habitable, will strike the Moon in 105 hours. Bergman proposes detonating nuclear bombs in space to create a shockwave that will force the Moon and the planet apart. If "Operation Shockwave" fails, the Alphans could evacuate to the far side of the planet – if it withstands the collision.

In Medical, Carter comes face to face with a hooded woman speaking in the same voice that he and Koenig heard earlier. The unidentified figure assures him that he is safe. Believing Carter to be suffering from radiation-induced hallucinations, the staff sedate him.

While surveying the planet from orbit, Koenig is intercepted and his Eagle swallowed up by a colossal space vessel. He exits the Eagle and enters a throne room occupied by a woman who introduces herself as Arra, Queen of Atheria – the approaching planet. Arra says that the Moon's departure from Earth was no accident: millions of years ago, her people foretold that the Moon and Atheria would meet. The Moon will survive the collision, which will act as a catalyst enabling the Atherians to evolve into noncorporeal beings. The Alphans must not interfere.

Arra releases the Eagle and Koenig returns to Alpha. To his subordinates' dismay, he cancels Operation Shockwave. Dr Russell and Bergman have him sedated and confined to quarters. Controller Morrow is put in command with orders to initiate Shockwave without delay. Sensing this treachery, Arra telepathically appeals to Koenig and Carter. Roused from their drugged sleep, the men overpower Alpha's security guards and storm Main Mission with laser-guns. Koenig insists that the Alphans have nothing to fear from Atheria, but his desperation only reinforces everyone's belief that he has gone mad. A struggle breaks out and Koenig and Carter are restrained. Russell moves to detonate the nuclear bombs, but the countdown expired during the fight and the collision is now inevitable. However, at the moment of contact, Atheria vanishes.

Russell apologises to Koenig, who replies that her actions were completely understandable. How could anyone have known that two bodies on a collision course would not collide, but merely touch?

== Cast ==
- Martin Landau as Commander John Koenig
- Barbara Bain as Dr Helena Russell
- Barry Morse as Professor Victor Bergman
- Prentis Hancock as Controller Paul Morrow
- Clifton Jones as David Kano
- Zienia Merton as Sandra Benes
- Anton Phillips as Dr Bob Mathias
- Nick Tate as Captain Alan Carter
- Suzanne Roquette as Tanya Alexander (uncredited)

== Production ==
Along with "Black Sun" and "War Games", "Collision Course" is considered to be one of the programme's most successful instalments by actors, crew and fans alike, exemplifying its metaphysical approach to science fiction. Penned by American-born British television writer Anthony Terpiloff, this story would showcase the author's pet theme of the perseverance of faith and trust over logic and reason. This approach would be seen in his subsequent contributions to the series ("Death's Other Dominion" and "Catacombs of the Moon").

The casting of Margaret Leighton as Arra was a coup for the series. Suffering from multiple sclerosis, the role of Arra was her penultimate performance (she died 13 January 1976 at the age of 53, four months after the episode was broadcast by ATV). Production designer Keith Wilson recalls while she had no difficulty with her craft, she required direction from Ray Austin to understand her abstract and complicated dialogue. Austin recalls her being transported to and from the set via wheelchair. She would tell him "You'd better get this shot, because I'm not going to last long," and they ploughed through her fifteen pages of work in an unprecedented two days.

The final shooting script contains unaired dialogue between Arra and Koenig. Cut for time, it had Arra explaining to the Alphan that if he were to consider the Universe as a microscopic cell, his galaxy could be thought of as a single chromosome, the Solar System as one gene and himself as a minuscule fragment of that gene. This missing sequence made sense of Arra's later line that the gene of which she and her people were part would mutate. Also lost was the end of the epilogue, where Koenig would leave Helena alone at the window. Gazing out into space, she was to suddenly assume an enraptured expression and utter "Arra..."

The Atherian spaceship and nuclear charge miniatures were constructed by Martin Bower. The spaceship model took 10 days to make and was sculpted in jelutong and plywood. The charges were adapted from a set of plastic picnic plates. Both would reappear in later spaceship graveyard sequences in "Dragon's Domain" and "The Metamorph".

=== Music ===
In addition to the regular Barry Gray score (drawn primarily from "Breakaway" and "Another Time, Another Place"), music tracks composed by Gray for the previous Anderson productions Captain Scarlet and the Mysterons, Joe 90 and the film Thunderbird 6 were also used.

== Reception ==
SFX magazine rated the episode B-plus, calling it generally "unremarkable" but elevated by the performances of the cast. SciFiNow magazine gave it 3 out of 5, stating that the plot "isn't anything to write home about". Video Watchdog praised the special effects and art direction but was less positive on the script, commenting that Terpiloff "tries to instil mystery mainly by being vague."

John Kenneth Muir praised the episode's production values and suspense, remarking that the last act is "filled with masterful direction and editing". He also wrote that the conflict between Koenig's faith and his colleagues' scepticism made for "an extremely exciting and thought-provoking" story.

John Brosnan was critical of the episode, characterising its story as "pseudo-mystical gobbledegook". He commented that it "[ended] with the Moonbase people looking awed and mystified by it all, while the viewer was left simply mystified. Even Star Trek at its silliest never got that silly." Dreamwatch Bulletin was also negative, calling the episode "so obfuscatory as to be incomprehensible". A later Dreamwatch issue rated it 4 out of 10.

Cinefantastique magazine described Leighton's role as "well-written" and "fascinating" and found her character's meeting with Koenig to be a rare moment of "poetry" in Space: 1999. On the ending, it commented: "The huge planet vanishes, having spiritually absorbed the mere Earthlings. Everyone congratulates Koenig. [...] But, wait, what about the integral theme – the issue of trust? What about the staggering implications of their magnificent metaphysical encounter'? Oh."

== Novelisation ==
The episode was adapted in the fourth Year One Space: 1999 novel Collision Course by E.C. Tubb, published in 1975. While being true to the script, Tubb would attempt to address the scientific criticism that shock waves cannot propagate through the vacuum of space. Bergman would theorise that the atomic blast would divert the Moon and Atheria by the creation of a 'sub-etheric' shock wave; the creation of a 'sub-atomic vortex' would act on not actual particles of matter, but on the 'sub-spatial matrix' confining them. It would be like moving bricks by moving the mortar binding them.
