= The Full Circle =

- Space: 1999 episode
- Episode no.: Series 1 Episode 12
- Directed by: Bob Kellett
- Written by: Jesse L. Lasky Jr. & Pat Silver
- Editing by: Alan Killick
- Production code: SP 15
- Original air date: 29 September 1975

Guest appearances
- Oliver Cotton as Spearman; Colin Rix as Eagle 1 Co-Pilot; Sarah Bullen as Kate; Chai Lee as Nurse; Alan Meacham as Dead Caveman (Sandos)

Episode chronology
← Previous "End of Eternity"	Next → "Death's Other Dominion"

"The Full Circle" is the 12th episode of the first season of Space: 1999. The screenplay was written by Jesse L. Lasky Jr. and Pat Silver; the director was Bob Kellett. The final shooting script is dated 17 September 1974. Live-action filming took place Tuesday 24 September 1974 through Tuesday 8 October 1974. The episode was first broadcast on 29 September 1975 in Australia and 11 December 1975 in the UK.

== Plot ==
An Eagle crew fail to return from a survey mission to a forest planet codenamed "Retha" (an anagram for Earth). The ship is flown back to Moonbase Alpha by remote control. Its only occupant is a dead humanoid who resembles a caveman. The incident reduces the Alphans' chances of colonising Retha before the Moon travels out of range.

Commander John Koenig and Captain Carter lead two Eagles in a rescue mission. Landing where the survey team set down, Koenig and Dr Russell's crew follow their trail into a ravine containing a wall of mist. As night falls, neither Carter nor Moonbase can raise Koenig's team. Carter lands and he and crewmate Sandra Benes prepare to look for their comrades in the morning. At dawn, however, Carter leaves on his own without waking Benes. He is caught in a trap and knocked unconscious by more cavemen, who abduct Benes. Recovering, Carter returns to the landing site as a third Eagle, carrying Professor Bergman and David Kano, arrives to investigate the loss of contact.

Benes' kidnappers take her to their tribe's caves. She catches the eye of the chief, who takes her for himself over the protests of his wife. Underneath their weathered faces, rotten teeth and unkempt hair, the chief and his wife look just like Koenig and Russell. Benes is made to swap her tunic for a leopard skin. The chief attempts to seduce her, but she knocks him out with a rock to the head and flees the caves. The wife orders the other tribespeople to hunt Benes down.

Avoiding the ravine, Bergman's group arrive at the caves as the chief's wife is conducting funerary rites for her dying husband. The tribespeople scatter at the sight of the Alphans. Carter searches for Benes. Near the mist, Bergman and Kano find Koenig knocked out by a concussion. They evacuate him to Alpha and he recovers. Dr Mathias reports that the man on the survey Eagle was its pilot, Sandos, who had somehow de-evolved by about 40,000 years. He died of heart failure, terrified when the Eagle lifted off on remote. Bergman, who noticed the chief's resemblance to Koenig, reasons that if Sandos regressed into a caveman, the same may have happened to Koenig. The answer lies at the ravine.

Koenig and Bergman return to Retha to save the rest of the Alphans. The tribespeople have re-captured Benes but are unaware that Carter is taking aim at them with his laser-gun. The newly arrived rescuers storm the cave, seize Benes and Carter, and withdraw. Pursued to the ravine, they intimidate the tribespeople with deliberate laser misses to force them to step into the mist. As chief's wife is enveloped, she recognises Koenig and utters her first intelligible word: "John". On the other side of the mist, Russell and the others emerge as their true selves.

As the Moon leaves the Retha system, Bergman speculates that the mist was the nexus of a time warp: entering it caused regression of body, mind and anything artificial to Cro-Magnon levels of human development. None of the affected Alphans remember the experience. Bergman, pondering human evolution, regrets that there is no opportunity for further study.

== Regular cast ==
- Martin Landau as Commander John Koenig
- Barbara Bain as Dr Helena Russell
- Barry Morse as Professor Victor Bergman
- Prentis Hancock as Controller Paul Morrow
- Clifton Jones as David Kano
- Zienia Merton as Sandra Benes
- Anton Phillips as Dr Bob Mathias
- Nick Tate as Captain Alan Carter
- Suzanne Roquette as Tanya Alexander (uncredited)

== Production ==
Director Bob Kellett embraced the opportunity this screenplay-offered to 'open up' the feel of the programme. Reportedly, he re-wrote much of the script (penned by American husband-and-wife writing team Jesse L. Lasky Jr. and Pat Silver) to realise his desire for this series' first (and only) extensive location shoot. As the Landaus disliked leaving the confines of Pinewood Studios, their scenes were shot on Stage 'M' (the ravine) and on the back lot behind the studio's ceremonial gardens. The rest of the cast assembled in nearby Black Park for the scenes set in Retha's lush forests.

Though delighted by the large role for her character and the idea of the location work, Zienia Merton recalls the trials of this shooting this episode. First, director Kellett handed her a leopard skin from which to improvise her own costume; he did not want fashionable caveman 'ready-to-wear'—à la Raquel Welch's 'fur-trimmed Maidenform bra' (in the 1966 film One Million Years B.C.), he would say. The weather was abominable, her uncooperative costume repeatedly exposed her bare chest, and a swarm of insects attacked her legs while she lay on the ground after her chase scene. At night, the crew gave her brandy to keep warm, and she claims to have gotten rather tipsy.

Production designer Keith Wilson was able to effectively revamp the infamous 'Ice Palace' set from the previous episode "Death's Other Dominion" into the Stone-Age home of the cavemen. The cavemen were mostly portrayed by the regular Moonbase background extras (including Glenda Allen, Tony Allyn, Sarah Bullen, Andy Dempsey and Christopher Williams). Alan Meacham, who played the dead caveman in the episode's 'hook', was Martin Landau's stand-in.

A student of Lee Strasberg and his Method acting, Barbara Bain went home in her cave-woman make-up to practise her primitive vocalisations. She recalls how her daughter chose this time to bring her first boyfriend home to meet her parents, only to find her mother's face smeared with dirt while she practised her banshee-like howls.

=== Music ===
An original score was composed for this episode by Barry Gray. The primitive, percussive compositions would be supplemented with his work from previous Space: 1999 episodes (especially "Another Time, Another Place") and a track from the film Thunderbird 6. This would be Gray's last contribution to the programme or any future Gerry Anderson production. After this, the two men went their separate ways, ending an eighteen-year collaboration.

== Reception ==
SciFiNow magazine rated the episode 2 out of 5, calling it "dull and overblown". SFX gave it a "C" grade and described the premise as "ridiculous". Awarding one out of four stars, commentator James O'Neill judged the episode "an easy-to-ridicule mess". TV Zone summed it up as "fifty minutes of dry ice, bearskins and nonsense".

Video Watchdog found the lead actors' portrayals of cavemen amusing, commenting that Landau's performance "[crosses] into outright camp." It criticised the writing, believing the story to be one of Space: 1999's "dullest and dumbest, making Hammer's Creatures the World Forgot seem inspired by comparison." According to Dreamwatch Bulletin, which rated the episode 5 out of 10, "[i]f ever there was a case of a real stinker of a story being inserted into the middle of a series to make the rest of the episodes look good by comparison, then 'The Full Circle' is it."

In a mostly positive review, John Kenneth Muir called the episode an "entertaining, straightforward adventure" featuring "stunning" location filming. He praised Landau and Bain's interpretation of de-evolved humans as well as the larger, more independent roles given to the supporting cast, such as Merton. In a later article, he wrote positively of the episode as a study of human nature. Also stating that the location shooting gives the story a "remarkable boost in terms of visuals and excitement", he applauded the plot twist about the Eagle's caveman passenger, the filming of the chase scene involving Benes, and Barry Gray's musical score, which he thought "underlines the action brilliantly". However, he noted that the origin and purpose of the "time warp mist" are not explained.

== Novelisation ==
The episode was adapted in the first Year One Space: 1999 novel Collision Course by E.C. Tubb, published in 1975. Tubb would make several changes to fit the story into the narrative of his novel: (1) As this story immediately follows 'Collision Course', Retha would appear from behind Atheria after that world's disappearance; (2) Carter and Sandra were romantically involved after her previous (unseen) break-up with Morrow; (3) The temporally-transformative mist was not confined to one area; when Koenig fired into the ground to frighten away whatever was watching him and Helena, mist rose up from the hole blasted in the soil and engulfed the pair.
