= Death's Other Dominion =

- Space: 1999 episode
- Episode no.: Series 1 Episode 13
- Directed by: Charles Crichton
- Written by: Anthony Terpiloff & Elizabeth Barrows
- Cinematography by: Frank Watts
- Editing by: Derek Hyde Chambers
- Production code: SP 14
- Original air date: 11 August 1975

Guest appearances
- Brian Blessed as Dr Cabot Rowland; John Shrapnel as Colonel Jack Tanner; Mary Miller as Freda; David Ellison as Ted; Jack Shepherd as Joe; Valerie Leon as a Thulian woman; Adrienne Burgess as a Revered One; Sarah Bullen, Andy Dempsey, Annie Lambert & Robert Philips as Alphans

Episode chronology
← Previous "The Full Circle"	Next → "Collision Course"

"Death's Other Dominion" is the 13th episode of the first series of Space: 1999, a 1970s British science fiction television series produced by Group Three for ITC Entertainment. Written by the husband-and-wife duo of Anthony Terpiloff and Elizabeth Barrows, and directed by Charles Crichton, it was the 14th episode produced and was shot at Pinewood Studios in September 1974.

Opening in 1999, the series follows the crew of lunar colony Moonbase Alpha after a massive nuclear explosion pushes the Moon out of Earth orbit and leaves it drifting through interstellar space. Unable to control the rogue planet's course or speed, the Alphans encounter various astronomical phenomena and alien civilisations as they search for a way back to Earth or a new world to settle on. In "Death's Other Dominion", the Alphans encounter a lost expedition of humans, stranded on an ice planet, who appear to have discovered the secret of immortality.

The episode first aired on 11 August 1975 in Australia and 2 October 1975 in the UK. It received mostly positive reviews from critics, who noted Shakespearean influences in its guest characters and dialogue.

== Plot ==
On a frozen planet, two humans – Dr Cabot Rowland and Colonel Jack Tanner – observe the approach of Earth's Moon. This event was predicted by Tanner. Rowland transmits a message to Moonbase Alpha inviting its occupants to visit the planet, christened "Ultima Thule". However, Tanner warns them not to.

With the Moon passing through the Thulian system, Commander Koenig takes an Eagle crew down to the planet. Unable to locate the people who contacted them, the group turn back but are caught in a blizzard and separated. Captain Carter makes it back to the Eagle and returns to Alpha. The Thulians find Koenig, Dr Russell and Professor Bergman unconscious in the snow and take them to their underground shelter.

The Thulians are the survivors of a 1986 expedition to Uranus which was caught in a space warp and hurled out of the Solar System. While little more than a decade has passed on Earth and the Moon, they have been stranded on Thule for centuries. However, they are no older now than when they arrived: somehow, they were displaced in time and have become incapable of ageing. Rowland, who is certain that he can isolate the immortality factor, believes the Thulians to be "gods" of the universe. They are building a spacecraft, Phoenix, to enable themselves to leave Thule and travel the cosmos.

Tanner senses Koenig's suspicion and shows him the failures of Rowland's immortality experiments. These are the "Revered Ones", expedition members who have been left mindless and zombie-like. Koenig rushes to Rowland's lab and finds Bergman in the experimental chamber. Tanner's wife Freda leads a revolt and Rowland's equipment is destroyed. Koenig faces backlash from Russell and Bergman, who find Rowland's goal laudable.

Rowland had shorted out the transceiver to cut off communication with Alpha, but Tanner and Koenig repair it. Launching an Eagle, Carter and Controller Morrow pick up Koenig's signal and land at the shelter. Attracted by the Thulian women, they request leave to remain on Thule. Koenig refuses to allow them a choice, pointing out that Alpha needs at least a skeleton crew to maintain operations. Either all the Alphans stay on Alpha, or they all settle on Thule.

It is decided to return to Alpha and debate the matter. Rowland, confident the Thulians and Alphans have a shared future, goes with them to make the case for Thule. Freda insists on accompanying them to warn of the dangers. Tanner says that neither Rowland nor Freda can leave, calling Thule a "jealous mother" who will never let them go. Shortly after launching the Eagle, Koenig and Carter hear Russell screaming in the passenger cabin. Rowland is dead, leaving only a rotted corpse – having left Thule, he has caught up with his true biological age. Now none of the Alphans want to move to Thule.

As the Moon leaves the system, Tanner and some of the other Thulians contact Alpha again. They have agreed to suspend the Phoenix project and devote themselves to restoring the Revered Ones instead. Koenig wonders whether death is what gives life true meaning.

== Regular cast ==
- Martin Landau as Commander John Koenig
- Barbara Bain as Dr Helena Russell
- Barry Morse as Professor Victor Bergman
- Prentis Hancock as Controller Paul Morrow
- Clifton Jones as David Kano
- Zienia Merton as Sandra Benes
- Anton Phillips as Dr Bob Mathias
- Nick Tate as Captain Alan Carter
- Suzanne Roquette as Tanya Alexander

== Production ==
The plot of "Death's Other Dominion" was loosely based on the 1933 fantasy adventure novel Lost Horizon, which had seen a second film adaptation released in 1973. The episode's title was inspired by a verse in Romans 6: "death hath no more dominion over him", concerning the resurrection of Jesus. In the script, the cold open contained more footage set on Alpha. Additionally, while the Alphans were described as wearing spacesuits on Ultima Thule, in the finished episode they wear ski salopettes, jackets and goggles. The script stated that Tanner was to have "the manner of a Shakespearean fool in search of an audience". As well as lines from King Lear, the character's dialogue includes references to works by John Keats and Gilbert and Sullivan.

Terpiloff and Barrows finished the script in late August 1974. Principal photography for the regular cast began on 9 September, with the guest cast joining them two days later. By 18 September, the shoot was about a day behind schedule. Photography was completed on 23 September with a busier-than-expected final day.

Fake ice was created by spraying the sets with formaldehyde. The resulting fumes gave the cast and crew breathing difficulties and streaming eyes, so pumps were brought in to purify the air. The set was ruled safe by an environmental health officer and a private doctor, and guest cast members Blessed and Shrapnel were happy to carry on filming their scenes. However, the Landaus' agents in the United States remained concerned and insisted on more pumps, as well as firm assurances there would be no lasting health effects, before allowing their clients to continue.

The Phoenix filming miniature, built by Martin Bower, was modelled on the ark spacecraft from the 1951 film When Worlds Collide. One of the effects shots of the Thulian surface was recycled for the Series 2 episode "One Moment of Humanity", in which it represents the planet Vega.

The incidental music was recycled from other Space: 1999 episodes, as well as the Thunderbirds episodes "End of the Road", "Edge of Impact" and "30 Minutes After Noon" and the Joe 90 episodes "Big Fish" and "Arctic Adventure". Post-production work concluded on 27 November 1974.

== Broadcast ==
"Death's Other Dominion" first aired on 11 August 1975 in Australia. In the UK, Associated and Yorkshire Television broadcast the episode on 2 October, followed by London Weekend on 4 October and Granada on 24 October. In the US, it was syndicated in late December 1975. On 24 August 1998, it was repeated on BBC Two in the UK.

== Reception ==
When "Death's Other Dominion" first aired in the Midlands, a reviewer for the Birmingham Daily Post criticised the scene of Rowland's demise, finding the sight of the character's corpse too horrific for child audiences. James Van Hise was critical of the overall episode, finding it hampered by "lacklustre" writing, a plot that is "so sluggish", and "the most incredibly wooden acting I've ever seen". However, he liked the special effects.

Later reviews were generally positive. DreamWatch Bulletin rated the episode 10 out of 10, describing it as a "serious adult drama" that exemplifies "the high standard the series could achieve when it tried." The magazine also stated that Blessed "excels" as Rowland. SFX magazine gave the episode "A-plus", praising the "bravura performances" from Blessed and Shrapnel and the "genuinely shocking" twist ending. TV Zone summed up the episode as "a great script, with great direction [...] and great thespians". Video Watchdog found it "enjoyable", adding that while the fake snow "looks suspiciously like shaving foam, [...] the other technical components are commendable [...]" SciFiNow rated it 3 out of 5.

Jay Allen Sanford found the episode "hokey", interpreting it as "kind of an inferior 'Who Mourns for Adonais?' Trek rip-off". However, he liked the production design and Blessed, commenting that the actor "rises above it all with an excellent (if unintentionally funny) performance."

In a complimentary review, John Kenneth Muir praised the direction, Blessed and Shrapnel's performances, and the "extremely effective and grisly climax". He found Ultima Thule highly believable, believing it to represent "some of the finest production values" in Space: 1999. Thematically, he considered the episode to be one of several that allude to "the downfall of technological man, and human arrogance". He also regarded it as the series' "best exploration of the issue of immortality".

Commentators have discussed the Shakespearean influences on the writing. Andrew Pixley described Rowland and Tanner as "two very Shakespearean characters". He noted that Rowland, like Lear, is a "ruler" who is "doomed because of a terrible flaw in his character", while Tanner can be compared to Lear's fool "or the prophet in Julius Caesar". Muir, who was pleased by the episode's "theatricality", observed that Rowland, "[l]ike Lear or Caesar, [...] is accompanied by a 'fool' and prophet in the form of Captain [sic] Tanner."
