= The Last Sunset (Space: 1999) =

- Space: 1999 episode
- Episode no.: Series 1 Episode 17
- Directed by: Charles Crichton
- Written by: Christopher Penfold
- Editing by: Alan Killick
- Production code: 11
- Original air date: 8 December 1975

Guest appearances
- James Fagan as Pete Johnson; Quentin Pierre as Security Guard; Sarah Bullen as Kate

Episode chronology
← Previous "Alpha Child"	Next → "Force of Life"

"The Last Sunset" is the 17th episode of the first series of Space: 1999. The screenplay was written by Christopher Penfold; the director was Charles Crichton. The final shooting script is dated 21 July 1974, with blue-page amendments dated 22 July 1974 and pink-page amendments dated 23 July 1974. Live-action filming took place from Tuesday 23 July 1974 through Tuesday 6 August 1974. A day of second-unit location work was completed on Wednesday 21 August 1974, during production of "Voyager's Return".

The episode first aired in Australia on 8 December 1975. In the UK, it was first broadcast on 1 January 1976.

== Plot ==
The Moon appears to have been captured by a planetary system and is on course to settle into orbit around its star. The system contains a single planet, which the crew of Moonbase Alpha have nicknamed "Ariel" and believe to be habitable. Unexpectedly, the Moon is visited by artificial probes from Ariel which emit a vapour that blankets the lunar surface. When the mist clears, the Alphans are astonished to find that the Moon has gained an Earth-like atmosphere and surface gravity. All probes except the first depart.

Before long, Alpha resembles a holiday resort as its crew relax and play on the moonscape. Taking a walk, Paul Morrow and Sandra Benes confess their love for each other and share a kiss.

As Professor Bergman proposes using cloud seeding to establish a rain cycle, the remaining probe fires energy bolts into the sky, generating clouds and rain. Noting that Alpha is built into Plato crater, Commander Koenig realises that a prolonged downpour would spell doom for the base – it will soon be at the bottom of a lake. He orders the Eagle squadron to scout for relocation sites.

Captain Carter, Dr Russell, Morrow and Benes are surveying the Taurus Mountains when their Eagle encounters a thunderstorm and crashes after being struck by lightning. Alpha organises an aerial search, but the Eagle is partly buried under a dune and cannot be found. Meanwhile, the other Eagles are grounded by system failures. An unknown element in the atmosphere is corroding all metals except those coated with a graphite compound. Koenig orders Alpha re-sealed and an Eagle reinforced with graphite.

The storm rages. Inside the crashed Eagle, Benes is injured and the survival rations are contaminated. Morrow cannot bear to see Benes suffering and sets out for Alpha on foot to bring back help. However, he collapses in the storm. His situation looks hopeless until he finds a mushroom-like organism that provides moisture and sustenance, giving him the strength to build a shelter.

Bergman calculates that Alpha's projections were wrong and the Moon is now exiting the system. Koenig is grim: as the temperature falls, the Moon's atmosphere will freeze and crush Alpha. He sets off in the graphite-coated Eagle to continue the search.

Morrow brings his crewmates to his shelter. Clearly delusional, he declares himself the founder of a civilisation in a new "Garden of Eden". As the probes return, Russell sights Koenig's Eagle. To draw his attention, she destroys the crashed Eagle by flooding it with oxygen and blowing it up with a shot from her laser rifle. Koenig lands, his instruments indicating that the air pressure is falling: the probes are removing the atmosphere. He is attacked by Morrow but knocks him unconscious.

Back at Alpha, Bergman discovers that Morrow's food source was a hallucinogen. As the probes depart, the voice of an Ariel native tells the Alphans that its people terraformed the Moon to dissuade them from coming to Ariel. Koenig insists that their intentions were peaceful, but the voice replies that they do not trust humanity. As the atmosphere dissipates, the star sinks below the horizon and the Alphans see their last sunset.

== Regular cast ==
- Martin Landau as Commander John Koenig
- Barbara Bain as Dr Helena Russell
- Barry Morse as Professor Victor Bergman
- Prentis Hancock as Controller Paul Morrow
- Clifton Jones as David Kano
- Zienia Merton as Sandra Benes
- Anton Phillips as Dr Bob Mathias
- Nick Tate as Captain Alan Carter
- Suzanne Roquette as Tanya Alexander (uncredited)

== Production ==
This story was one of the original outlines conceived for the writers' bible. Executive producer Gerry Anderson thought that effects supervisor Brian Johnson would be able to save money by filming most of the visual effects against the real sky and with natural lighting. As it turns out, the wires supporting the models were always visible; the method would have cost much more than filming in the Bray Studios' stages and the idea was abandoned.

This episode featured the first location filming for the series with the scenes set on the Moon surface during the rain storm. Erecting some modular flats to represent the Moonbase airlock exterior, this sequence was shot in the Pinewood Studios car-park two weeks after principal photography was completed.

This episode highlights the Morrow-Benes romance (whose tenuous beginnings were seen in "Black Sun") evolving into a true relationship in this story. A line of dialogue was trimmed directly before the kissing scene where, after Morrow guesses wrong, Sandra was supposed to answer her own question 'Do you know the sound I miss most in the silence of space?' with the reply, 'The sound of children.' Both actress Zienia Merton and director Charles Crichton felt this made the character seem too desperate on what was essentially a first date and they substituted an enigmatic look.

Scenes shot, but cut from the final print include: (1) A segment in the Technical Section where technicians replace the shattered window with a panel that can be opened. The end of the scene is left in where the window is opened and Koenig, Bergman and Helena are shown enjoying the breeze; (2) A line trimmed from the later scene where they discover the corrosive quality of the atmosphere (but retained for clarity in the above synopsis) has Koenig ordering all the windows replaced. With these two cuts, many viewers were left with the impression that the Alpha windows were always able to be opened; (3) More bits with Bergman poring over maps and satellite photos, proclaiming where rivers would flow and cities should be built were trimmed for time.

"The Last Sunset" is the only episode of the first series to feature only the regular cast and background extras. Zienia Merton recalls, though, early drafts had the Paul-Morrow-as-hallucinating-prophet role written for an Italian guest artist. As the filming date approached, the actor became unavailable at the time of filming, and his material was given to Prentis Hancock.

The Italian edition was lost in the RAI buildings, but with many registrations of the series, was taken by a worker of a closed company, then, after many vicissitudes, the episode was transmitted, but the first minutes are with English audio!

=== Music ===
In addition to the Space: 1999 Barry Gray score (drawn primarily from "Matter of Life and Death" and "Black Sun"), music tracks from the previous Gerry Anderson television productions Joe 90, The Secret Service, Stingray, Supercar and the film Thunderbird 6 also composed by Gray were used.

== Reception ==
SFX rated the episode "A-plus", commenting that it "gives the supporting cast an opportunity to shine." Video Watchdog found it particularly "enjoyable, thanks mainly to Charles Crichton's direction and a satisfying curtain". SciFiNow gave it 4 out of 5.

John Kenneth Muir wrote that the episode was overloaded with incident and criticised its failure to link the aliens' terraforming to the discovery of the hallucinogenic food. However, he praised the expanded roles of Bain, Hancock and Merton's characters. Dreamwatch Bulletin rated the episode 7 out of 10, commenting that while "a little short on plot", the episode contains "enough interesting quirks and twists to give it the pace it requires."

TV Zone magazine considered the episode a disappointment. The review called the plot about the crashed Eagle "unstimulating" and the aliens' terraforming strategy "ludicrous".

== Novelisation ==
The episode was adapted in the second Year One Space: 1999 novel Moon Odyssey by John Rankine, published in 1975.
