= Mission of the Darians =

- Space: 1999 episode
- Episode no.: Series 1 Episode 7
- Directed by: Ray Austin
- Written by: Johnny Byrne
- Editing by: Derek Hyde Chambers
- Production code: SP 22
- Original air date: 30 October 1975

Guest appearances
- Joan Collins as Kara; Dennis Burgess as Neman; Aubrey Morris as High Priest; Paul Antrim as Bill Lowry; Robert Russell as Hadin; Gerald Stadden as Male Mute; Jackie Horton as Female Mute; Ann Maj-Britt as Ann; Sarah Bullen as Kate; Linda Hooks as Female Darian; Ron Tarr as Male Survivor; Jenny Cresswell as Female Survivor

Episode chronology
← Previous "The Last Enemy"	Next → "The Troubled Spirit"

"Mission of the Darians" is the seventh episode of the first series of Space: 1999. The screenplay was written by Johnny Byrne; the director was Ray Austin. The original title was "Mission of the Darya". The final shooting script is dated 7 January 1975. Live-action filming took place Friday 10 January 1975 through Friday 24 January 1975.

== Plot ==
The Moon is passing a colossal spaceship, Daria. Moonbase Alpha picks up a recorded distress call from the ship, telling of heavy damage and casualties. A rescue team headed by Commander Koenig flies to Daria in an Eagle, but no one greets them at the airlock. The party split up to explore the ship. Koenig and Professor Bergman are captured by men in radiation suits. Dr Russell and security officer Lowry encounter a pair of mute dwarves, then a band of cavemen-like savages. The savages abduct Russell, Lowry and one of the dwarves while the other dwarf hides in the Eagle. Returning to the Eagle, Controller Morrow and Captain Carter discover the dwarf and persuade him to take them to their shipmates.

The savages call themselves "the Survivors" and are led by Hadin. They take Russell, Lowry and the dwarf to their camp, where they worship a mural of a god called Neman. They declare the dwarf a "mutant" and kill her by placing her in a vaporisation chamber. Lowry, who is missing a joint in one of his fingers, is murdered in the same way. Russell, who has no birth defects, is spared the chamber but presented to Neman as a sacrifice. The Survivors' high priest summons "the Spirits" and the mural opens, revealing radiation-suited crewmen who seize Russell. Morrow and Carter attack. One of the crewmen is overpowered but the other drags Russell away. Morrow goes after them before the hatch closes.

The remaining crewman agrees to lead everyone to the command area, where Koenig and Bergman have been taken. Koenig and Bergman are met by Kara, who recounts the plight of the Darians. Nine hundred years ago, all but one of the ship's nuclear reactors exploded. Many of the 50,000 crew survived, albeit mutated; only the 14 in the command area were shielded from the fallout. Kara introduces the captain, Neman – the spitting image of the Survivors' god. Neman reveals that their home planet was destroyed and the ship is a generational ark carrying them to a new world. He invites the Alphans to join them.

Koenig and Bergman learn that with their food supplies exhausted, the Darians have resorted to cannibalism. Kara and Neman explain that the Survivors were taught to give the mutated and infirm to the food recycling system and preserve the healthy for sacrifice. They reveal their cause: a gene bank which will be used to create a new Darian race to replace the declining Survivor population. The sacrifices are harvested for their organs to provide life-extending transplants for the 14 "true" Darians – the centuries-old command crew, including Neman and Kara. Rescuing Russell, Koenig realises this is the intended fate for the Alphans. Neman offers Koenig immortality in exchange for Alpha's population.

Carter's group storm the command area and overwhelm the crew. Hadin rejects Neman's divinity and smashes his head through the gene bank, killing him and destroying the equipment. Koenig orders an end to the violence. With both factions gathered around him, he persuades them that their only hope is to work together. With Daria at peace, Koenig and his team return to Alpha.

== Regular cast ==
- Martin Landau as Commander John Koenig
- Barbara Bain as Dr Helena Russell
- Barry Morse as Professor Victor Bergman
- Prentis Hancock as Controller Paul Morrow
- Clifton Jones as David Kano
- Zienia Merton as Sandra Benes
- Nick Tate as Captain Alan Carter

== Production ==
This story, Johnny Byrne's favourite of his contributions to the series, was based on real-life events surrounding the 1972 plane-crash of an Uruguayan rugby team in the Andes Mountains. After ten weeks, sixteen survivors (out of forty-five passengers) were rescued; shortly after, the truth came out they had resorted to cannibalism to stay alive. The fact that, after 'a million years of civilisation', the Darians could commit technological cannibalism formed the episode's primary theme. This tale was combined with a spin on racial purity (for 'Darians' read 'Aryans') and placed in similar circumstances as author Brian Aldiss' novel Non-Stop, involving two disparate cultures existing on a generation ship.

Guest star Joan Collins was already a science-fiction icon at the time of the shoot, having appeared as Captain Kirk's doomed love Edith Keeler in the Hugo Award-winning Star Trek episode "The City on the Edge of Forever" in 1967. A prolific actress, she had appeared in dozens of films and television programmes produced on both sides of the Atlantic before taking the role of the Darian aristocrat, Kara. In 1981, she would assume the defining role of her career: the scheming, flamboyant man-eater Alexis Carrington in the American prime-time television drama Dynasty.

The design of the Daria miniature model was inspired partly by the look of the space arks in the film Silent Running (1972). The hull of Daria is seen to include one of the conical atomic-waste pit caps from Nuclear Disposal Area Two in "Breakaway"; the model's large central dome structure would be used in the second series as the 'transference dome' building seen in "Journey to Where". The Survivors' settlement area was revamped from the expansive Gwent interiors constructed for the previous episode, "The Infernal Machine". The eternal flame in the Shrine of Knowledge burned in the shell of the Ariel satellite prop seen in "The Last Sunset".

Two actresses playing background Darians, Linda Hooks and Jenny Cresswell, would make subsequent appearances in the series: Hooks would be cast in the remounted scenes of "The Last Enemy" as a member of Dione's crew; Cresswell (Miss Anglia of 1969) would appear throughout the second series as a background extra.

=== Music ===
In addition to the regular Barry Gray score (drawn primarily from "Another Time, Another Place"), the 'space horror music' composed by Vic Elmes and Alan Willis for "Ring Around the Moon" is heard during scenes portraying the Survivors' acts of violence. The introduction from Frank Cordell's composition 'The White Mountain' is used as the Darian theme. Robert Farnon's 'Experiment In Space—Vega' makes an appearance, as do excerpts from previous Joe 90 and Stingray scores, composed by Barry Gray. The ditty hummed by Bill Lowry is 'A Wand'ring Minstrel I' from the Gilbert and Sullivan comic opera The Mikado.

== Reception ==
SFX magazine rated the episode A-plus, praising its "clever, exciting" script and "superb" special effects. SciFiNow gave it 3 out of 5, calling it one of the series' "darkest" stories.

John Kenneth Muir described the episode as a "full-scale triumph", praising the premise and aspects such as the Daria filming model and interior set design, as well as Collins' performance. He commented that Byrne "successfully suggests that how a race survives is just as important as survival itself", also writing that "rarely has the idea [of an interstellar ark] been presented in such realistic and grotesque terms".

Video Watchdog was critical of the episode, commenting that "[t]he silliness of Christopher Penfold's [sic] script is compounded by laughable costumes and some of the tackiest special effects of the [Space: 1999's first] season." It considered Collins' character the "silliest alien" of the series.

== Novelisation ==
The episode was adapted in the sixth Year One Space: 1999 novel Astral Quest by John Rankine, published in 1975.
