= The Troubled Spirit =

- Space: 1999 episode
- Episode no.: Series 1 Episode 8
- Directed by: Ray Austin
- Written by: Johnny Byrne
- Editing by: Alan Killick
- Production code: SP 19
- Original air date: 27 December 1975

Guest appearances
- Giancarlo Prete as Dr Dan Mateo; Hilary Dwyer as Laura Adams; Anthony Nicholls as Dr James Warren; Jim Sullivan as Alphan Musician; Tony Allyn as Security Guard; Vernon Morris as Male Botanist; Xanthi Gardner as Female Botanist; Valentino Musetti as Spirit Mateo

Episode chronology
← Previous "Mission of the Darians"	Next → "Space Brain"

"The Troubled Spirit" is the eighth episode of the first season of Space: 1999. The screenplay was written by Johnny Byrne; the director was Ray Austin. The final shooting script is dated 11 November 1974. Live-action filming took place Wednesday 20 November 1974 through Wednesday 4 December 1974. The episode was first broadcast on 27 December 1975 on Yorkshire Television.

== Plot ==
Alphan botanists led by Dr Dan Mateo conduct an experiment to further Mateo's aim of establishing communication between plants and humans. Mateo has discovered that plant life emits electrical waves comparable to human brainwaves. He hopes to isolate the waves in his mind, amplify them using the group's mental power, and project them at plants nearby. Linked by electrodes to a transmitter, the botanists hold hands around a table and Mateo slips into a trance.

Mateo's superior Dr Warren, who had warned Mateo about the dangers of the experiment, arrives and halts the proceedings. As the circle is broken, Mateo collapses in agony, the lights dim, and a freezing wind blows. Mateo is taken to Medical, where Dr Russell notes that he is unusually sensitive to psychic phenomena. Laura Adams, Mateo's girlfriend, is furious that Warren's interference could have killed Mateo.

Russell feels a chilling breeze and sees a humanoid figure with a deformed face and hand. A security sweep finds no one else in the area except Mateo, who is under sedation. Concluding that Russell had a psychic episode linked to Mateo's experiment, Koenig officially cancels his project.

After being discharged, Mateo experiences several mysterious incidents: sounds of footsteps in empty corridors, doors anticipating his commlock instructions, and a sourceless shadow stalking him. Livid to find Warren dismantling his transmitter, he threatens the doctor's life. He then flees when he sees his own hand briefly transform into a withered claw. The wind returns and Warren is murdered by a figure hiding among the plants.

Professor Bergman reveals that each time the temperature dropped, Alpha's instruments also detected Mateo's electrical waves. Bergman theorises that they are newly discovered form of psychic energy. It is speculated that Mateo, while exploring the most primitive area of the human brain, has awakened a latent paranormal ability with the power to kill. Frightened by what Mateo has unleashed, Adams begs him not to reassemble the transmitter. Mateo angrily ejects her from his workshop and she is killed by the figure shortly after.

Grief-stricken, Mateo admits to threatening Warren and Adams but insists that the murders were committed by someone else: an entity which is somehow bound to him, carrying out his subconscious urges. To force it into the open, he obtains permission to recreate his experiment. With the mental power of a larger group, he conjures up his mutilated doppelganger. It is a vengeful spirit hunting those who ended Mateo's project, thus destroying the spirit. Mateo collapses and spirit fades away.

Bergman is fascinated by the idea of a spirit avenging its death pre-emptively. To neutralise it, he proposes a scientific version of exorcism. Mateo is given a psychotropic drug to induce violent emotions. He is then placed behind a force field. He awakens, and his anger at being confined escalates to making death threats against Koenig. The wraith springs from his body and launches itself at Koenig, only to be repelled by the force field. Mateo grapples with it, but it overpowers him and pushes his face into the energy barrier. After an explosion of energy, the spirit has vanished and Mateo lies dead on the floor – his body burned in the same way as the spirit.

== Regular cast ==
- Martin Landau as Commander John Koenig
- Barbara Bain as Dr Helena Russell
- Barry Morse as Professor Victor Bergman
- Prentis Hancock as Controller Paul Morrow
- Clifton Jones as David Kano
- Zienia Merton as Sandra Benes
- Anton Phillips as Dr Bob Mathias
- Nick Tate as Captain Alan Carter
- Suzanne Roquette as Tanya Alexander (uncredited)

== Production ==
Script editor Johnny Byrne's idea for "The Troubled Spirit" arose from his desire to write a science-fiction ghost story. He was pleased with the symmetry that organically evolved—the spirit coming to avenge a death that had not yet occurred, and the Alphans, in their attempts to counter the dangerous presence in their midst, actually causing the death they are trying to avert. In the early 1970s, the idea of human-plant communication was a popular concept, as was the notion that the human brain contained many underused areas which contained paranormal super-powers.

Both Byrne and production designer Keith Wilson recall that producer Sylvia Anderson was greatly involved in the creative development of this episode. Mrs Anderson's usual concerns were production design and the supervision of the actors; executive producer Gerry Anderson normally oversaw the writing staff. Her interest in Byrne's tale had her running the story meetings for this instalment, rather than her husband.

In 1973, when RAI had agreed to co-finance the series, they had one stipulation: the programme would feature Italian talent. The characters that became Sandra Benes and Alan Carter were originally written as Italian nationals. Giancarlo Prete had been selected to play 'Captain Alfonso Catani', head of Reconnaissance. Shortly before production began, the Italian actor resigned, unwilling to commit to the twelve-month stay in England the role would require. (The part was quickly rewritten and awarded to Nick Tate.) Prete would be the first of four Italian guest artists chosen to fulfil the agreement. Sylvia Anderson selected him because he was not intimidated by series' star Martin Landau; Landau's ego, she recounts, was threatened by the Italian actors visiting for screen testing.

The script contained several differences from the finished episode: (1) The music programme was written as a string quintet, of which Professor Bergman was a member—this was suggested by the presence of a violin in his quarters in the earlier episode "Alpha Child"; (2) Characters were to have spoken Mateo's given name 'Dan' throughout the segment; in the televised version, everyone only used his surname—including his girlfriend – the cast in fact pronounced it as "Matteo" sounds in Italian, i.e. "Matthew"; (3) In a scene cut for time (but glimpsed in the 'This Episode' sequence), Bergman demonstrated his method to destroy the spirit: energy matching the spirit's wave pattern, but with reversed polarity. When in contact, the two opposing forces would cancel each other out.

The animated energy shimmer seen when the spirit vanishes and is absorbed into Mateo's body was the only new visual effect seen in this instalment; the shots of Moonbase were library footage. The superimposed images of the spirit were practical effects, done 'in camera' with a half-silvered mirror.

=== Music ===
Supplemented by the regular Barry Gray score (drawn primarily from "Another Time, Another Place"), English musician 'Big Jim' Sullivan would compose an eerie, atmospheric composition for the sitar to serve as the primary music track. Sullivan, a prolific session guitarist of the time, also appeared on camera—dressed in an Alpha uniform. He is the performer seen playing the piece in the story's opening scenes.

== Reception ==
Critical response has been mixed. Jay Allen Sanford of the San Diego Reader commented positively on the episode. Journalist and Space: 1999 fan Shaqui Le Vesconte called it "one of the best stories, featuring a twist to the usual 'ghost story' with an Alphan haunted by his future self seeking vengeance for his death. The use of Indian sitar music gives this tale a quite unique and chilling atmosphere." David Scott of Dreamwatch Bulletin regarded the episode as the best of Space: 1999's first series: "Perhaps this one stands out because mood pieces are rare in Space: 1999 [...]" Although he conceded that the episode "doesn't make a lot of logical sense" and has "another of those open-mouthed endings", he found the premise "a nice idea, pursued with an excellent spooky atmosphere." A later Dreamwatch article praised the episode as "a television rarity – a genuinely scary ghost story", with a "brilliantly sustained" introduction. SFX magazine rated the episode "A-plus".

Video Watchdog's John Charles found the episode "satisfying if predictable", helped by its "transplanting of horror standbys (like a séance and a discussion of exorcism) into a futuristic setting", as well as its "atmospheric moments" and "eerie" use of sitar. TV Zone's Richard Houldsworth called it "a mediocre 1999 story; as ever it is impeccably made, but the basic idea is rather corny [...] and features some implausible moments [...]" He also wrote that as the series' "first attempt at a supernatural story", it was "perhaps too successful for its own good". However, he praised its "remarkable camera work", particularly the use of tracking shots, as well as the "eerie lighting" and Mateo's "sterling prosthetics make-up". He also noted that despite the episode's horror content, in some parts of the UK it was first shown in a morning children's timeslot, which "must surely have proved too much for some young stomachs."

John Kenneth Muir praised the direction, music and performances, but found aspects of the plot (such as the plants' relationship to the spirit) confusing, commenting: "[o]ne wishes that Austin were using all that directorial skill in the service of a more comprehensible story." SciFiNow magazine rated the episode 2 out of 5, calling it "abject nonsense that's just saved by the earnest delivery of the cast". Dreamwatch Bulletin found Landau and Bain's acting "hammy" and detrimental to the story.

== Novelisation ==
The episode was adapted in the fifth Year One Space: 1999 novel Lunar Attack by John Rankine, published in 1975.
