= Hazel McBride =

British actress

- Born: 24 March 1949 (age 76); Enfield, Middlesex, England
- Occupation: Actress

Hazel McBride (born 24 March 1949) is a British actress known for her role as Madeleine Duclos in the BBC television drama series Secret Army.

McBride became involved in amateur dramatics while reading history at Bristol University and her first professional engagement was working in a children's theatre company in Glasgow before her work for repertory theatres around the UK.

With a solid list of theatre credits including runs in the West End and Bristol Old Vic, McBride began to make appearances in television dramas in the 1970s before gaining the role of Madeleine in Secret Army, appearing in its second and third series in 1978 and 1979.

After the series ended its run, McBride continued her acting career mostly in theatre and television. She was interviewed about her time on Secret Army for the special features of the third series DVD release in 2004.

As of 2010, she is the director of School English Scene, a theatre company created to support English teaching in British secondary schools. In this capacity, she has written, produced, and directed.

== Selected TV credits ==
Year	Title	Role	Episode
1974	Within These Walls	Heather	Labour of Love
1975	Thriller	Nurse	A Killer with Two Faces
1975	Edward the Seventh	Jeanne Granier	The Peacemaker
1976	Dickens of London	Margaret Beadnell	Love
1976	Sutherland's Law	Susan Abercrombie	The Eye of the Chameleon
1977	Survivors	Alice	Bridgehead
1977	The Mackinnons	Debbie Hodge	Working Weekend
1977	Van der Valk	Stewardess	Dead on Arrival
1977	Space:1999	Medical officer	The Dorcons
1978-79	Secret Army	Madeleine Duclos	Regular role (2 series)
1980	Take the High Road	Jackie Ogilvie	Recurring role
1981	Maybury	Anne Mieggs	Trouble at Home
1981	The House on the Hill	Hester	The Mistress of the House
1982	The Professionals	Liz Spalding	You'll Be All Right
1983	Tales of the Unexpected	Louise Medway	The Luncheon
1983	Hart to Hart	Lady Claire Belgrave	Harts and Hounds
1987	Rumpole of the Bailey	Mrs. Addison	Rumpole and the Judge's Elbow
1989	Only Fools and Horses	Snobby girl	Yuppy Love
1989	The Bill	Kate Power	Only a Bit of Thieving
2001	Coupling	Giselle	The End of the Line
2007	After You've Gone	Mrs. Campbell	Look Back in Anger
2008	Midsomer Murders	Governor	Midsomer Life
