= The Testament of Arkadia =

- Space: 1999 episode
- Episode no.: Series 1 Episode 5
- Directed by: David Tomblin
- Written by: Johnny Byrne
- Editing by: Derek Hyde Chambers
- Production code: SP 24
- Original air date: 2 December 1975

Guest appearances
- Orso Maria Guerrini as Luke Ferro; Lisa Harrow as Anna Davis; Tony Allyn as Guard 1 (Irwin); Quentin Pierre as Guard 2 (N'Dole); Sarah Bullen as Kate

Episode chronology
← Previous "Dragon's Domain"	Next → "The Last Enemy"

"The Testament of Arkadia" is the fifth episode of the first series of Space: 1999. The screenplay was written by Johnny Byrne; the director was David Tomblin. The final shooting script is dated 5 February 1975, with a revised final shooting script dated 25 February 1975. Live-action filming took place Tuesday 11 February 1975 through Tuesday 25 February 1975. The episode was first broadcast on 2 December 1975 in the United States and 12 February 1976 in the UK.

In the episode, the Moon is inexorably pulled towards a planet devastated by a nuclear war, causing Moonbase Alpha energy reserves and essential supplies to be rapidly depleted. The Alphans discover the planet was once inhabited by an ancient human civilisation predating Earth's own.

== Plot ==
The Moon changes direction and enters a solar system, coming to a halt near a potentially habitable planet. Moonbase Alpha begins to steadily lose power. The cause is presumed to be an unidentified force emanating from the planet.

With Alpha on course for total power failure, the planet could be the crew's only chance for survival. Commanding an Eagle, Koenig leads a survey mission. The team includes two specialists: polymath Anna Davis and engineer Luke Ferro. The planet is lifeless, having been devastated by nuclear war in the distant past, and its survivability prospects are grim: it will take two years to reclaim the soil and sow crops, but Alpha's food supply will run out in less than a year.

In a cave, the team find a collection of skeletons and wall markings resembling the root language Sanskrit. Analysis shows that the beings, who died of radiation poisoning some 25,000 years ago, were virtually indistinguishable from humans. Translating the markings, Davis realises that they are a historical record: the "Testament of Arkadia", which notes that some of the planet's population left for other worlds. The testament ends with a plea to make Arkadia live again. Ferro believes that the Arkadians were humanity's forebears. His theory is corroborated by petrified leaves found by Davis, which match those of Earth trees. Unknown to the rest of the team, Ferro and Davis are distracted by an intense, eerie chord. Wordlessly, their fear turns to understanding.

During the flight back to the Moon, Alpha's power drain miraculously stabilises at 50%. As the base can continue to run on half power, Koenig cancels the evacuation to Arkadia. Fanatically believing that they are destined to revitalise the planet, Ferro and Davis request permission to settle there – just the two of them. Koenig refuses: dividing Alpha's food supply would condemn the base to starvation. Undeterred, the pair take Dr Russell hostage, demanding an Eagle and three years' provisions in exchange for her life. Koenig agrees, but Ferro refuses to surrender Russell until they are beyond Alpha's reach.

On the journey back to Arkadia, Russell tries to reason with Ferro and Davis. However, the pair are adamant that Arkadia's restoration gives meaning to the Moon's voyage through space. Docking with an Eagle piloted by Captain Carter, they release Russell. Koenig, who had a homing device put on Ferro and Davis' Eagle, initially plans to locate them and take back the provisions. He rescinds the order when the Moon stirs into motion – now free of the unknown force – and Alpha's power returns, making the lost supplies irrelevant. As the Moon leaves Arkadia, Ferro and Davis, watching from the planet's surface, take comfort in the knowledge that they are home. Koenig and Russell speculate on the nature of what drove them there.

Koenig concludes that with humanity's return to Arkadia, history has come full circle. He adds that while Ferro and Davis may be a new Adam and Eve, the other Alphans must keep faith in the "higher purpose" of the Moon's journey.

== Regular cast ==
- Martin Landau as Commander John Koenig
- Barbara Bain as Dr Helena Russell
- Barry Morse as Professor Victor Bergman
- Prentis Hancock as Controller Paul Morrow
- Clifton Jones as David Kano
- Zienia Merton as Sandra Benes
- Anton Phillips as Dr Bob Mathias
- Nick Tate as Captain Alan Carter
- Suzanne Roquette as Tanya Alexander (uncredited)

== Production ==
"The Testament of Arkadia" was the final episode produced for Space: 1999's first series. Script editor Johnny Byrne and director David Tomblin worked closely together to craft this episode—mostly, Byrne recalls, as there was little money left in the series' budget. The idea of the 'ancient astronaut' was popularised by Swiss author Erich von Däniken in his book Chariots of the Gods? published in 1968. Melding this premise with the spirituality of the Adam and Eve story of Creation excited Tomblin, but Byrne felt it was a little too 'on the nose' with the imposed religious context. Though he was enjoying the story, he felt it was let down by the time limitations of the one-hour episode format and the necessary under-budgeting. Fan response was positive, as the episode is seen to bring the (unintended) story arc of the Moon's predestined journey through space to a conclusion.

Orso Maria Guerrini was the last of four Italian artists employed by the series as per an agreement with RAI, the Italian production company and series financial partner. Guerrini's English proved difficult to understand and his dialogue was dubbed by renowned voice artist Robert Rietti. Tony Allyn and Quentin Pierre had played unnamed Security guards throughout the series. The script for this episode listed their surnames as 'Irwin' and 'N'Dole', though these were never spoken aloud. Koenig's voice-over narration throughout the story was a last-minute addition, used to clarify several abstract plot points.

Producer Sylvia Anderson felt that 'we were really just getting into our stride in this episode—episode twenty-four. It was probably a little slower than some of the other episodes, but quite profound. I think Johnny Byrne was taking a very interesting concept, and more to the point...we learned about the characters.' However, her personal and professional partnership with husband Gerry Anderson came to an end soon after the conclusion of filming. Before the wrap party, he made known his intentions of asking for a legal separation. Afterwards, she resigned as both the programme's producer and a partner in the Group Three production company.

It was decided hiring an American head writer would end the time-consuming necessity of ITC New York vetting the scripts (plus bring a more American outlook to the programme). Experienced writer/producer Fred Freiberger would be selected for this position, mainly due to his position as showrunner for the final season of Star Trek. With the producer's chair now vacated by Sylvia Anderson, he would assume the dual position of head writer and producer.

Though the programme was an international success, Sir Lew Grade was disappointed by the series' failure to secure an American network sale. This was coupled with its lukewarm reception in Britain (due to the lack of a coordinated network showing on ITV and having been labelled an 'American import'). In the autumn of 1975, as work progressed on the second series, ITC Entertainment announced to the production team that, unless the format was drastically retooled (specifically favouring American viewers), Space: 1999 would be cancelled.

=== Music ===
In addition to the regular Barry Gray score (drawn from "Breakaway" and "Another Time, Another Place"), excerpts from Paul Bonneau and Serge Lancen's composition Suite Appassionata – Andante are featured throughout the episode and Jack Arel and Pierre Dutour's Picture of Autumn is used during Ferro and Anna's encounter with the Arkadian intelligence.

== Reception ==
John Kenneth Muir called the episode "a literate and profound story with a true sense of wonder", aided by the Dutour and Lancen incidental music and the performances of Guerrini and Harrow. He viewed it as Series 1's "most important" episode for showing how the Moon's journey is being guided by a "cosmic intelligence" – thus "making profound, almost spiritual sense" of several of the earlier episodes in the series. SFX magazine rated the episode "A-plus" and named it a "surreal triumph of direction" by Tomblin. SciFiNow gave it 4 out of 5, calling it "great".

TV Zone gave a mixed review, calling the Arkadians' reveal "over-the-top" and the music increasingly "intrusive" but conceding that the episode has "some great moments". Video Watchdog found the episode reasonably suspenseful with a "satisfying" conclusion, even though the writing was "weak".

In contrast, DVD Review magazine considered it "possibly the most cringingly embarrassing" episode of Space: 1999, stating: "Remember the 'space hippies' episode of Star Trek? This is Space: 1999's equivalent." Dreamwatch Bulletin reviewers found the plot "an intolerably pompous variant on the Shaggy God story" or a "load of pseudo-religious clap trap, but done very atmospherically".

== Novelisation ==
The episode was adapted in the sixth Year One Space: 1999 novel Astral Quest by John Rankine, published in 1975.
