= The Dorcons =

- Space: 1999 episode
- Episode no.: Series 2 Episode 24
- Directed by: Tom Clegg
- Written by: Johnny Byrne
- Editing by: Alan Killick
- Production code: SPII 24
- Original air date: 2 April 1977

Guest appearances
- Patrick Troughton as the Archon; Ann Firbank as Consul Varda; Gerry Sundquist as Malic; Laurence Harrington as Stewart; Hazel McBride as the Dorcon doctor; Roy Scammell as Maya/Creature

Episode chronology
← Previous "The Immunity Syndrome"	Next → —

"The Dorcons" is the series finale of Space: 1999. The screenplay was written by Johnny Byrne; the director was Tom Clegg. Working titles were "The Last of the Psychons" and "Return of the Dorcons". The final shooting script is dated 17 November 1976. Live-action filming began on Tuesday 7 December 1976 and wrapped on Thursday 23 December 1976.

The episode was first broadcast in the UK on 30 October 1977 by Granada Television, having previously aired on KRON-TV, San Francisco on 2 April 1977.

== Plot ==
An alien probe approaches the Moon and fires an energy beam at Moonbase Alpha, immobilising the crew and scanning their minds before vanishing. The probe then changes its molecular structure to become a spaceship.

Maya identifies the vessel as a Dorcon ship and says that its crew are searching for her. A highly technologically advanced race, the Dorcons are the archenemies of her people, the Psychons. Their ships are equipped with meson converters that give them power over matter, enabling them to transform it into energy and project it through space.

Aboard the ship, the Dorcons – led by their supreme ruler, the Imperial Archon – debate how to capture the last of the Psychons without killing her. Malic, the Archon's nephew and heir to the throne, proposes an all-out assault on Alpha, but the Archon backs chief advisor Varda's more diplomatic approach.

On Alpha, Maya explains that the Dorcons have been hunting down the Psychons to acquire the secret of immortality. Before she can say any more, Varda contacts Commander Koenig and formally demands that he hand over Maya, threatening to attack Alpha unless he complies. Koenig refuses and puts the base on maximum alert.

Maya reveals that the Dorcons want her for her biology. Dorcon brainstems eventually fail, causing death, but Psychon brainstems have regenerative properties that can last forever; when a Psychon brainstem is surgically grafted onto a Dorcon brain, the result is virtual immortality.

The Dorcons bombard Alpha with energy weapons. The base returns fire but none of its armaments can penetrate the Dorcon ship. Not wanting to be taken alive, Maya begs to be killed, which gives Koenig an idea. Pressing a laser gun to Maya's head, he contacts the Dorcons and swears to kill her unless they cease fire. The Dorcons have no choice but to obey.

Devising a new plan, the Dorcons activate their meson converter and transport Varda and her guards into Alpha's Command Center. After forcing the Alphans' surrender, the Dorcons seize Maya and beam her back to the ship with them. Koenig follows them into the beam but is quickly restrained when he rematerialises among the Dorcons. While Maya is taken away for brainstem extraction, the Dorcons begin recharging the converter to transport Koenig back to Alpha. Koenig breaks free and runs into an armed Malic – who shoots his own guards and gives Koenig a head start before alerting Varda to his escape. As Varda and others pursue Koenig, Malic corners and murders the Archon.

Koenig rescues Maya and together they make for the converter. Declaring himself Archon, Malic orders the Dorcons to capture Maya and kill Koenig. Reaching the converter, Koenig and Maya are confronted by Varda, who intends to kill everyone on Alpha for the Archon's murder. Malic arrives and Koenig exposes him as the real killer. Malic shoots Varda – whose dying act is to destroy the converter, causing the ship's molecular structure to start breaking down. Jumping into the transporter beam, Koenig and Maya make it back to Alpha as the ship disintegrates, killing Malic and the remaining Dorcons.

== Regular cast ==
- Martin Landau as Commander John Koenig
- Barbara Bain as Dr Helena Russell
- Catherine Schell as Maya
- Tony Anholt as Tony Verdeschi
- Nick Tate as Captain Alan Carter
- Alibe Parsons as Alibe

== Production ==
The episode carried the working title "Return of the Dorcons" on a shooting script dated 19 October 1976. With much of the same scene structure and dialogue, several differences exist: (1) The script notes the title 'Archon' should be pronounced the same as 'march on' to avoid confusion with the episode title "The Mark of Archanon"; (2) Helena is relegated to the underground shelters with her patients before the attack and is not seen until the epilogue; (3) Maya transforms into a potted plant to hide from Varda and threatens to shoot herself with Verdeschi's gun when outed. Koenig talks her out of committing suicide; (4) A different epilogue was scripted where the six regular characters relax in Koenig's quarters. The question of her Psychon past caused Maya to recollect an encounter with a handsome Psychon boy during a holiday to her planet's Southern Flora Region. Jealous, Verdeschi sweeps her off her feet and out of the room. When left alone, Koenig and Helena reflect that "What's in the past has gone...fate has played us some strange hands but we've won through in the end. As for the future...that starts right here and now," and would close the scene with a kiss. (This seems to acknowledge the staff's awareness this would be the programme's final instalment.)

Many of the changes from the above version of the script would be motivated by the budgetary restrictions of this being the series' last episode. Scenes set in Medical and Koenig's quarters would take place in Command Center in the re-write. The scene showing Helena in an underground shelter was cut. Carter would have been shown coordinating Bill Fraser and the Eagle attack force on the Dorcon ship from Command; in the final draft, Fraser went unmentioned, and Carter himself was seen via TV monitor in the pilot's seat, leading the strike. The Dorcon vessel's sets were constructed out of pre-existing flats and set-dressings from previous episodes.

This instalment would fulfil first-season script editor Johnny Byrne's three-script commitment to producer Fred Freiberger. After seeing his scripts "The Biological Soul" and "The Face of Eden" (later "The Metamorph" and "The Immunity Syndrome") extensively re-worked (for the worse by his reckoning) for new series format, he gave the man a 'Freddie Freiberger/Johnny Byrne' action adventure story which would revolve around Maya, but done in such a way she would be rendered helpless. Tired of Maya being used to get out of every perilous situation, he created a race that hunted Psychons—as they would be able to control them.

The episode was a replacement another Byrne script, "Children of the Gods", which Byrne wanted to use for the series finale but Freiberger disliked. In it, the Alphans are terrorised by a pair of sociopathic children with formidable mental powers. The children are revealed to be their distant descendants, brought back in time by an alien race. The aliens have caused these children to be raised alone, without any human contact, to prove that Mankind is inherently amoral. They intend to destroy Alpha in the present to prevent the birth of these future Alphans. Koenig then must prove Mankind's worthiness to survive.

=== Music ===
The score was re-edited from previous Space: 1999 incidental music tracks composed for the second season by Derek Wadsworth and draws primarily from the scores of "The Metamorph" and "Space Warp".

== Reception ==
The episode has had a mixed critical response. SFX magazine rated it a B+, while Dreamwatch gave it 5 out of 10. John Kenneth Muir regarded it as Series 2's best episode, with "a strong cohesive storyline, an intense pace and incredible production values." On the other hand, TV Zone magazine commented that even though the script is "entertaining enough, [...] as a conclusion to a two-year space saga, one might have hoped for something a little more substantial." Greg Jameson of website Entertainment Focus found the episode wanting for a series finale, noting that it "doesn't resolve the premise of the show." However, he added that it was arguably "a fitting end to a series that never quite figured out how to make the most of its premise."

An earlier article in TV Zone praised Schell's performance, writing that she "acts her heart out." It called Maya's reaction to seeing the Dorcon ship "one of the series' most dramatic moments".

== Novelisation ==
The episode was adapted in the sixth Year Two Space: 1999 novel The Edge of the Infinite by Michael Butterworth published in 1977. This novel was not released in the United Kingdom and only as a limited edition in the United States and West Germany. The adaptation was based on the earlier version "Return of the Dorcons".
