= Jane Hansen (model) =

New Zealand beauty queen

Jane Cheryl Hansen (born, 1952) is a New Zealand model and beauty queen who was crowned Miss International 1971.

Hansen, became the first, and up to now the only, Miss New Zealand to win the Miss International crown. She was among the 50 delegates who competed in the pageant when it was held in Long Beach, California.

Awards and achievements
Preceded by (Philippines) Aurora Pijuan	Miss International; 1971	Succeeded by (United Kingdom) Linda Hooks
