= The Immunity Syndrome (Space: 1999) =

- Space: 1999 episode
- Episode no.: Series 2 Episode 23
- Directed by: Bob Brooks
- Written by: Johnny Byrne
- Cinematography by: Frank Watts
- Editing by: Mike Campbell
- Production code: SPII 23
- Original air date: 19 March 1977

Guest appearances
- Nadim Sawalha as Zoran; Karl Held as Jerry Travis; Sam Dastor as Dr Ed Spencer; Hal Galili as the voice of the alien; Roy Boyd as Joe Lustig; Jack Klaff and Harry Fielder as Alphans

Episode chronology
← Previous "Devil's Planet"	Next → "The Dorcons"

"The Immunity Syndrome" is an episode of the second series of Space: 1999, a 1970s British science fiction television series produced by Gerry Anderson Productions for ITC Entertainment. Written by Johnny Byrne and directed by Bob Brooks, it was filmed at Pinewood Studios in November and December 1976. It first aired in the UK on 23 October 1977 on Granada Television and 29 October 1977 on London Weekend Television, having previously aired on KRON-TV, San Francisco on 19 March 1977.

Opening in 1999, the series follows the crew of lunar colony Moonbase Alpha after a nuclear explosion pushes the Moon out of Earth orbit and into interstellar space. Unable to control the rogue planet's trajectory, the Alphans encounter various astronomical phenomena and alien civilisations as they search for a way back to Earth or a new world to settle on.

In "The Immunity Syndrome", a group of Alphans survey a planet which seems perfect for colonisation, only to find themselves fighting for survival when they are attacked by an incorporeal alien and the planet's biosphere suddenly and inexplicably turns toxic. The episode received a mixed response from commentators.

== Plot ==
The Moon is passing an Earth-like planet which seems perfect for colonisation. A survey team led by Commander Koenig finds water sources and fruit-bearing trees. There are no signs of civilisation except a hatch built into a rock wall. The Alphans reactivate its solar power source, hoping to open the hatch once the cells are charged. The fruit and water are found safe to consume, and various Alphans sample them.

Joe Lustig is dazzled by a pulsating light. This makes him take leave of his senses and point his laser sidearm at Controller Verdeschi. Verdeschi tackles Lustig, and in the ensuing struggle the laser goes off, killing Lustig. Verdeschi is attacked by the light and found delirious by Koenig. Verdeschi fires his laser at Koenig but misses, then collapses.

Lacking a treatment for Verdeschi, who is now comatose, Dr Spencer urges medical evacuation to Moonbase Alpha. Koenig has just taken off in an Eagle carrying Verdeschi when inexplicable events occur. The water and fruit become toxic and those who tried them are fatally poisoned. Transceivers explode, leaving the survivors cut off from Alpha. In the air, the Eagle's metal components corrode, forcing Koenig to crash-land. Observing from Alpha, Maya and Dr Russell discover that the planet's biosphere is now teeming with harmful elements.

Spencer discovers that Lustig's brain cells were expanding, causing intense intracranial pressure. The same is happening to Verdeschi. With the solar cells for power, the Alphans use non-metal components to build a transmitter. Establishing one-way communication with Alpha, Koenig forbids a rescue: any Eagles sent down to the planet will disintegrate. Fearing for their comrades, Russell and Maya realise they could safely reach the surface in a non-metal glider.

The solar cells are charged and the team open the hatch. The chamber beyond contains the remains of Zoran, last survivor of a party who met their demise after they encountered the light, went insane, then lapsed into coma and death as the planet turned on them. In holographic recordings, Zoran says the light represents a powerful, yet peaceful, incorporeal being. The environmental changes are simply its way of attempting to make friendly contact with other life-forms.

Launching an Eagle carrying the glider, Fraser flies Russell and Maya into the planet's atmosphere. As the Eagle starts to degrade, Fraser releases the glider containing Russell and Maya, and climbs to safe altitude. After a rough landing, Russell and Maya are reunited with the others. Maya tends to Verdeschi, who is nearing death.

Zoran's recordings reveal that he built a protective suit so he could make safe contact with the alien. However, the visor was defective and he was struck down by the light. The Alphans fix the suit and Koenig volunteers to confront the alien in it. Koenig and the alien meet in a clearing. At first, the alien has no concept of corporeal beings and can only repeat Koenig's words back to him. Eventually, trust and understanding are reached. Removing the visor, Koenig looks at the alien with no ill effects.

Learning of the death and destruction it has caused, the alien is overcome with grief and returns the planet to its idyllic state. However, the Alphans can no longer settle there because the Moon is moving out of range, forcing them to return to Alpha.

== Regular cast ==
- Martin Landau as Commander John Koenig
- Barbara Bain as Dr Helena Russell
- Catherine Schell as Maya
- Tony Anholt as Controller Tony Verdeschi
- Nick Tate as Captain Alan Carter
- John Hug as Pilot Bill Fraser
- Alibe Parsons as Alibe

== Production ==
Johnny Byrne's script was extensively rewritten by Series 2 producer Fred Freiberger. It was previously an unused Series 1 submission titled "The Face of Eden" – Eden being the nickname the Alphans gave the planet. As scripted by Byrne, the story spanned two weeks and most of it was presented as flashbacks narrated by Dr Russell. Commander Koenig was among the Alphans who fell victim to the alien, a female entity called Kwali who shapeshifted into a young woman at the end of the story. Guest character Jerry Travis was originally called Yuri Salkov. Freiberger's initial rewrite changed Kwali's name to "I Am I" and made the alien an embodiment of the planet. The harmful environmental changes were revealed to be a form of immune response, I Am I believing the Alphans to be an infection. Subsequent revisions made the alien's precise nature and motives more ambiguous.

The title "The Immunity Syndrome", matching that of a 1968 Star Trek episode, has been attributed to Freiberger, who produced Star Trek's third season.

"The Immunity Syndrome" was filmed over 14 days in November and December 1976. Zoran's log entries were filmed live in-studio with actor Nadim Sawalha seated behind a gauze screen to create a cost-effective holographic look. The sound accompanying the incorporeal's appearances was a stock effect originally recorded for the 1961 film The Innocents.

== Reception ==
Commentators noted that the episode shares its title with an episode of Star Trek. Some expressed confusion at the title, believing it irrelevant to the story. John Kenneth Muir considered it to be the episode's greatest weakness, stating that the plot has nothing in common with the Star Trek episode. He wrote: "In a season where so many stories were reminiscent of Star Trek, it is a real shame to saddle a more original and more satisfying story with such a derivative title!" According to James F. Iaccino of Benedictine University, while the plot is "vastly superior" to that of the Star Trek episode, the title "probably infuriated Trekkies, who saw Space: 1999 using as many elements of their show as possible in order to capture ratings as well as their audience".

Muir wrote positively of the episode in general, stating that it "works surprisingly well" for the most part. He praised its "fast action, great special effects and strong character moments", particularly Anholt's performance as the injured Verdeschi. He regarded the episode as part of Series 2's "final upswing", coming after a number of "mid-season yawners". Although satisfied by the reveal of the alien's benevolence, he argued that the link between the alien and the environmental changes is not well explained.

Rating "The Immunity Syndrome" 7 out of 10, Dreamwatch magazine called it "a breath of fresh air" compared to some earlier Series 2 episodes, with "respectable" action scenes, some "genuine drama" and "a real sense of impending catastrophe". Reviewer Anthony McKay added that – choice of title aside – the episode provides "the right mix of action and science fiction to produce an enjoyable 50 minutes of escapism". SFX magazine found the premise engaging but argued that the plot ends weakly, stating that Koenig just "stands and talks". It graded the episode a "B" or "fairly average".

Reviewers for TV Zone were critical of the episode. According to Matthew Cooke, it comes across as "unusually tired" as well as "unforgivably cheap and cheerful". He found it ill served by its entirely in-studio production, arguing that the setting deserved a location shoot. Richard Houldsworth considered it to be one of Byrne's lesser episodes, describing the result as "a final fling from a flagging series". He wrote that it "tries desperately hard to be a good, action-packed adventure, but falls sadly short of the mark due to its tired plot." He compared the incorporeal being, the sight of which drives people mad, to an alien in the Star Trek episode "Is There in Truth No Beauty?" (1968), and the outbreaks of corrosion to the plastic-eating virus in "The Plastic Eaters" (1970), the first episode of Doomwatch.
