= John Rankin =

John Rankin may refer to:

== Sports ==
- Jack Rankin (rugby union) (John Rankin, 1914–1989), New Zealand rugby player
- John Rankin (footballer, born 1983), Scottish footballer with Ross County, Hibernian, Dundee United etc.
- John Rankin (1910s footballer), Scottish footballer Third Lanark, Airdrieonians
- Johnnie Rankin (1901–1952), Scottish footballer with Hamilton, Dundee, Charlton, Chelsea etc.

== Government ==
- John Rankin (Canadian politician) (1820–?), represented Renfrew North in the 1st Canadian Parliament
- John E. Rankin (1882–1960), United States Representative from Mississippi
- John M. Rankin (1873–1947), Iowa state representative and attorney general
- John Walker Rankin (1823–1869), American politician
- John Rankin (British politician) (1890–1973), Scottish member of parliament, 1955–1973
- John Rankin (diplomat) (born 1957), British diplomat

== Other people ==
- John Rankin (abolitionist) (1793–1886), American Presbyterian minister, educator and abolitionist
- John W. Rankin, captain of the USS Phoenix (CL-46) cruiser at Pearl Harbor
- John Morris Rankin (1959–2000), Canadian pianist and fiddler, member of The Rankin Family

== See also ==
- John Rankine (disambiguation)
- Jon Rankin, middle and long-distance runner
