= Matter of Life and Death (Space: 1999) =

- Space: 1999 episode
- Episode no.: Series 1 Episode 2
- Directed by: Charles Crichton
- Written by: Art Wallace & Johnny Byrne
- Editing by: Derek Hyde Chambers
- Production code: SP 2
- Original air date: 27 November 1975

Guest appearances
- Richard Johnson as Lee Russell; Stuart Damon as Astronaut Parks; John Oxley as Astronaut Bannion; Tony Allyn as Security Guard One; Quentin Pierre as Security Guard Two; Barbara Kelly as Computer Voice

Episode chronology
← Previous "Breakaway"	Next → "The Infernal Machine"

"Matter of Life and Death" is the second episode of the first series of Space: 1999. The screenplay was written by Art Wallace and Johnny Byrne; the director was Charles Crichton. The original title was "Siren Planet". The final shooting script is dated 8 January 1974. Live-action filming took place Monday 14 January 1974 through Wednesday 30 January 1974.

== Plot ==
While surveying the newly discovered "Terra Nova", an Earth-like planet on which the Alphans hope to settle, an Eagle is struck by an energy bolt that knocks its crew unconscious. Flying on automatic pilot, the Eagle returns to Moonbase, where the Alphans discover an impossible stowaway – Dr Helena Russell's husband, Lee, the medical officer on a Jupiter-bound ship which was believed destroyed when it became trapped in the planet's atmosphere and burned up.

Alpha's medical technology reads no vital signs from the seemingly resurrected Lee, who is barely coherent and initially refuses to speak to anyone but Russell. When she expresses her desire to make her home on Terra Nova, he is greatly disturbed and dispenses an electric shock that temporarily incapacitates them both. Medical imaging shows that Lee has normal body temperature and metabolism only when Russell is present, suggesting that whatever force is sustaining him is being drawn from her.

Lee remembers being on Terra Nova, but cannot recall for how long or how he came to be there. He tells the Alphans that the planet is inhabited, but not in a way they would understand. If they land there, they face power beyond comprehension – their "opposite" — which will "annihilate" them. Seeing he has failed to dissuade them from going, he dies. Russell realises that Lee never truly returned.

While Commander Koenig and Russell fly another Eagle survey team to Terra Nova, examination of Lee's corpse shows that his cells are undergoing polarity reversal – transforming them into antimatter. Professor Bergman notes that a matter-antimatter collision causes annihilation. The corpse discharges more electricity, then vanishes. Bergman contacts Koenig and Russell's Eagle, imploring Koenig to abort the survey and return to Alpha before they hit any antimatter, but Koenig refuses.

Landing on Terra Nova, the survey team discover a lush, fertile world. Bergman calls with news that Alpha's atmospheric seals are melting. The Eagle smokes and combusts, then the Moon itself is shattered by a massive explosion. The shockwave ravages Terra Nova, causing widespread devastation that kills the whole team except Koenig and Russell. Koenig then sacrifices himself to save Russell from a rockslide.

Russell is met by "Lee", who regrets that he was unable to convince the Alphans of the danger. It is revealed that Lee and his crew encountered a form of radiation that transported Lee through space and turned him into the opposite of his original self – what humans would call antimatter. He tells Russell to leave; if she stays, the destruction will increase. She begs him for help, and he embraces her and tells her to see what she wants to see. Sharing in Lee's power, Russell is able to reverse time, restoring Terra Nova, the survey team, and the Moon. She tells Koenig that they cannot stay, and the Commander cancels plans to settle on Terra Nova.

After the team return to Alpha, Koenig joins Russell on an observation balcony. As the Moon leaves the Terra Nova system and the planet fades from view, Russell bids Lee a final, silent farewell.

== Regular cast ==
- Martin Landau as Commander John Koenig
- Barbara Bain as Dr Helena Russell
- Barry Morse as Professor Victor Bergman
- Prentis Hancock as Controller Paul Morrow
- Clifton Jones as David Kano
- Zienia Merton as Sandra Benes
- Anton Phillips as Dr Bob Mathias
- Nick Tate as Captain Alan Carter
- Suzanne Roquette as Tanya Alexander (uncredited)

== Production ==
When Irish author and poet Johnny Byrne was hired for six weeks to quickly produce shootable material for the series (which had gone into production with only one completed script—its premiere episode, "Breakaway"), he was handed a screenplay from American television writer Art Wallace entitled "Siren Planet". With the script written for an earlier format of the series, Bryne was forced to do a complete re-write. Byrne reconceived the story as a science-fiction mystery, retaining as its core concept the return of Helena's dead husband and adding the threat of antimatter. Completed in two weeks, it was this script that convinced story consultant Christopher Penfold to bring Byrne on staff full-time.

The original material seemed to be more of an homage to the 1970 novel Solaris by Polish author Stanisław Lem, with facsimiles of the staff's dead relatives appearing on Alpha to prevent their landing on the planet. Rather than give warning, aliens in the guise of Helena's late husband (named Telford Russell at this point) and, in the climax, Koenig's late father would use deception and trickery to manipulate the Alphans.

Zienia Merton recalls when reading the script, she was expected to sweep a large spider off the shoulder of Prentis Hancock's character Morrow. Suffering from arachnophobia, she panicked and stormed the office of producer Sylvia Anderson. Taking in Merton's agitated state, Anderson jumped to conclusions and asked if she was pregnant. Fortunately, the real problem was easily solved with a minor re-write of the script: Hancock's character was killed and Merton's blinded.

This episode introduced the character of David Kano, head of the Technical Section and resident computer expert, played by Clifton Jones. Jones had been brought in quickly to replace actor Lon Satton, who had proved unpopular with the cast during the filming of "Breakaway"; the shooting script still contained his character's name, Benjamin Ouma.

In a 1995 interview, Anton Phillips (who played Dr Mathias) named "Matter of Life and Death" his favourite Space: 1999 episode.

=== Music ===
An original score was composed for this episode by Barry Gray. The electric guitar solo track played while Lee Russell goes berserk was conceived and performed by Sylvia Anderson's son-in-law, musician Vic Elmes. A music track from the Gerry Anderson film Thunderbirds Are Go also composed by Gray was used. With production delays plaguing the premiere episode, "Breakaway", the music for this segment was the first to be composed and recorded.

== Reception ==
Calling the episode "one of the best so far", the Los Angeles Times suggested that Wallace and Byrne should receive an Emmy Award nomination for their script. Reviewer Dick Adler praised Crichton's direction, adding that the whole cast "reflect the stress and yearning of the predicament beautifully".

SciFiNow magazine rated the episode 4 out of 5. SFX gave it "B-plus", calling it "a little dull" but "mysterious and atmospheric". Reviewer Chris Bentley praised the production design and music but believed that the conclusion was a letdown. TV Zone commented negatively on the episode, criticising how it presents main characters dying then "[bouncing] back to life later on for no apparent reason."

John Kenneth Muir described "Matter of Life and Death" as "a confused story with an implausible ending", commenting that the episode is "crippled by plot holes and poor character motivation". He wrote that Koenig is shown to act with uncharacteristic rashness and the Russells' relationship lacks credibility. He also criticised the episode's depiction of antimatter, believing it to be inaccurate, as well as the way in which the characters are resurrected. He called the climax "dramatically bankrupt" and more an "excuse" for elaborate stunts and special effects.

== Novelisation ==
The episode was adapted in the first Year One Space: 1999 novel Breakaway by E. C. Tubb, published in 1975. Tubb made several significant changes to fit the story into the narrative of his novel: (1) As this story immediately follows "Breakaway", Meta and Terra Nova are made the same planet. This adds another mystery to the story, as how could a rogue planet far beyond the warmth of the sun maintain a shirt-sleeve environment; (2) Lee Russell is a representative of the alien race, masquerading as Helena's dead husband to gain her trust; (3) The deaths of Koenig and company, the destruction of Terra Nova and the Moon, and Lee Russell's miraculous act of restoration are explained away as a bad 'trip'; the fruit Helena sampled is discovered to contain hallucinogenic compounds and is presented as a more logical explanation for the events concluding the story.
