= George Heinemann =

American television producer

George Heinemann (9 December 1918 – 21 August 1996) was an American television producer. He was a recipient of Peabody Award which he received for producing children-related programming in 1971.

== Career ==
In 1971, he received the Peabody Award. He also received Emmy Award nominations; for NBC Children's Theatre in 1966 and Tut: The Boy King in 1978.

== Notable work ==
- Ding Dong School
- Take a Giant Step
- Watch Your Child/The Me Too Show
