= The Infernal Machine (Space: 1999) =

- Space: 1999 episode
- Episode no.: Series 1 Episode 3
- Directed by: David Tomblin
- Written by: Anthony Terpiloff; Elizabeth Barrows
- Editing by: Alan Killick
- Production code: SP 21
- Original air date: 8 January 1976

Guest appearances
- Leo McKern as Companion and Gwent; Gary Waldhorn as Winters; Tony Allyn as Security Guard 1; Quentin Pierre as Security Guard 2; Sarah Bullen as Kate; Barbara Kelly as Computer Voice

Episode chronology
← Previous "Matter of Life and Death"	Next → "Dragon's Domain"

"The Infernal Machine" is the third episode of the first series of Space: 1999. The screenplay was written by Anthony Terpiloff and Elizabeth Barrows; the director was David Tomblin. The final shooting script is dated 11 December 1974. Live-action filming took place between 20 December 1974 and 9 January 1975.

== Plot ==
An unidentified spacecraft lands on the lunar surface close to Moonbase Alpha. The ship is crab-like, flanked by two rotating sets of legs. Making contact with Alpha, the alien pilot orders Commander Koenig, Dr Russell and Professor Bergman to come aboard. The group drive over in a buggy and enter a vast control centre. They meet a sickly old man who introduces himself as "Companion". He is aide to the ship's master, an unseen entity called "Gwent" – which addresses the Alphans, stating that part of its purpose in landing is to obtain materials vital to its wellbeing. Gwent is not a person, but the ship itself, which is a cybernetic intelligence.

Gwent has infiltrated Alpha's Computer and identified the supplies it needs from the base's stores. It demands immediate delivery, but Koenig, angered by the intrusion, refuses. Gwent responds by threatening Alpha, activating the ship's legs and moving towards the base. Eagles are launched to disable the ship, but it is invulnerable to their weapons. The dying Companion reveals that he is actually Gwent's creator – but as the intelligence evolved, its personality was corrupted and he became its slave. He expires, leaving Gwent distraught.

Repeating its demands, Gwent tries to secure Koenig's cooperation by torturing him with a pain-inducing light ray. It quickly tires and goes into a "rest" mode to save power. Bergman suspects that as well as supplies, their host came to the Moon to seek a replacement for Companion.

Deducing that Gwent is blind as well as increasingly frail, Koenig silently transmits code to Alpha, ordering the base to resume its attack. Squads of Eagles and laser-equipped tanks mount an all-out assault on the ship. Alpha has the upper hand until Gwent deploys its punishment beam on the whole base, forcing Koenig's surrender. Once an Eagle has delivered the supplies, Gwent will release Bergman; Koenig and Russell, however, will spend the rest of their lives as Companions.

In a rescue attempt, Alpha switches the Eagle crew for an armed security team led by Captain Carter. As the supplies are being unloaded, Gwent uncovers the ruse. It keeps Bergman as retaliation and forces Carter's group away with the punishment beam. It then orders Koenig's group to assist in its re-fuelling process. They decline and are punished again, but the beam is weaker than before. Seeing this as evidence of Gwent's failing power, Koenig taunts Gwent. Demanding obedience, Gwent reveals its original identity: Delmer Powys Plebus Gwent, a scientist from the planet Zemo, who built this vessel by uploading his personality into a computerised brain.

Reasoning that if Gwent uses the last of its strength to destroy Alpha, it too will be destroyed, Koenig smashes the new fuel rod. Gwent realises that its efforts to achieve immortality – travelling the cosmos, blind and dependent on others – have left it empty and isolated. What began as an instinct for self-preservation has turned into vanity. Embracing death, it shuts down. Koenig jams a fuel rod fragment into an access port to restore minimal power, enabling him and the others to escape. Gwent takes off, then destroys itself by deliberately crashing into a lunar mountain. Koenig eulogises it as a "lonely, blind creature looking for its death."

== Regular cast ==
- Martin Landau as Commander John Koenig
- Barbara Bain as Dr Helena Russell
- Barry Morse as Professor Victor Bergman
- Clifton Jones as David Kano
- Zienia Merton as Sandra Benes
- Nick Tate as Captain Alan Carter

== Production ==
Husband-and-wife writing team Anthony Terpiloff and Elizabeth Barrows based this episode on the 1934 play The Infernal Machine by Jean Cocteau—which itself was based on Sophocles' tragedy Oedipus Rex. In it, the blinded Oedipus is portrayed as pompous, prideful and arrogant. To give the story a science-fiction twist, Terpiloff and Barrows made the main character a rampaging cybernetic entity. The writers hoped to have Ralph Richardson play the dual role of Gwent and Companion; instead, the role went to Australian actor Leo McKern (best known in the genre for his being one of several actors to portray the enigmatic 'Number Two' in the espionage-fantasy series The Prisoner).

When interviewed, model-builder Martin Bower stated the motorised 'Gwent' miniature used in this episode provided the least happy experience for the Bray Studios' effects crew during production. With its twin set of rotating legs, it was almost impossible to get a realistic shot of the heavy model rolling across the miniature lunar landscape during the required take-off and touchdown sequences. At the end of filming, visual effects director Nick Allder picked the five-foot-wide model up bodily and, throwing it across the studio in sheer frustration, destroyed it. A fourteen-inch version built for distance shots survived.

Bower also built three different designs of laser tank for the episode, the only time they appear significantly in the series. All were based on 1/25 scale Tamiya Chieftain tank models.

During the production of the previous episode "Space Brain", a make-up artist had noted a small lump on actor Prentis Hancock's neck. That weekend, he went to hospital and the tumour was surgically removed. Fortunately, the mass was found to be benign. As "The Infernal Machine" was scheduled to begin filming during his convalescence, Paul Morrow was replaced by the one-off character Winters, portrayed by Gary Waldhorn.

=== Music ===
In addition to the regular Barry Gray score (drawn primarily from "Breakaway" and "Another Time, Another Place"), a number of library compositions were used: 'Outer Space' by Robert Farnon, 'Lunar Landscape' by Roger Roger, 'Mission Control' by Harry Sosnik, 'The Monsters' by Ivo Vyhnalek, 'Dark Suspense No. 1' by Beda Folten, and 'Suspense' by Joe Venuto. An excerpt from the Thunderbirds score, composed by Gray, was used to score the Alphans' second attack on Gwent.

== Reception ==
John Kenneth Muir considered "The Infernal Machine" to be just above average, finding the script tonally inconsistent and Tomblin's direction unable to "keep [the] story moving forward satisfactorily", given that most of the episode is set in a single, vast room on the Gwent ship. He praised the episode for its "solid" premise and "interesting" guest character, played "excellently" by McKern.

SciFiNow magazine rated the episode 3 out of 5.

SFX gave it an "A-plus", praising McKern's performance. Reviewer Chris Bentley found "The Infernal Machine" to be a "superior" example of the "supercomputer episode" commonly featured in television science fiction.

TV Zone praised the performances and special effects, describing the Gwent ship as a "marvellous" creation. It called the episode "a delightful example of science fiction drama".

Video Watchdog found the episode "unremarkable" apart from McKern's performance. Reviewer John Charles commented: "The ending can be seen a mile away, but the quality of McKern's work holds one's attention throughout."

== Novelisation ==
The episode was adapted in the sixth Year One Space: 1999 novel Astral Quest by John Rankine, published in 1975. Following the final shooting script, it would include Morrow rather than the substitute character, Winters.
