= John Rankine =

John Rankine may refer to:

- John Rankine (Australian politician) (1801–1864), colonial Australian landowner and politician
- John Rankine (Wyoming politician), American politician
- John Rankine (moderator) (1816–1885) Scottish minister
- John Rankine (legal author) (1846–1922), Scottish jurist
- John Rankine (colonial administrator) (1907–1987), governor of Western Nigeria, acting governor of Fiji
- John Rankine (writer) (1918–2013), British writer

== See also ==
- John Rankin (disambiguation)
