= Spacewarp =

Spacewarp or Space Warp may refer to:

== Entertainment ==
=== Toys ===
- Spacewarp (toy), a 1980s build-it-yourself marble coaster originally sold by Bandai.
- Spacewarp (transformer), a female Decepticon originally based on Jetfire.

=== Video games ===
- Spacewarp, a software product by Bug-Byte.
- Space Warp, an ASCII game loosely based on Star Trek.

=== Other media ===
- "Spacewarp", a 2015 song by Mark Sherry.
- "Space Warp", the 39th episode of Space: 1999.
- "The Invaders from the Space Warp", a story in Detective Comics which introduced Zook.

== Science and technology ==
- Asynchronous SpaceWarp, a framerate smoothing technique used on the Oculus Rift.
- Hyperspace, a method of traveling in science fiction.
- Warp drive a fictitious spacecraft propulsion system.

== See also ==
- Warp (disambiguation)
