= Voyager's Return =

- Space: 1999 episode
- The Queller Drive activates on Voyager One
- Episode no.: Series 1 Episode 15
- Directed by: Bob Kellett
- Written by: Johnny Byrne
- Editing by: Derek Hyde Chambers
- Production code: SP 12
- Original air date: 1 September 1975

Guest appearances
- Jeremy Kemp as Ernst Queller; Barry Stokes as Jim Haines; Alex Scott as Aarchon

Episode chronology
← Previous "Collision Course"	Next → "Alpha Child"

"Voyager's Return" is the 15th episode of the first series of Space: 1999. Written by Johnny Byrne from an idea by Joe Gannon, and directed by Bob Kellett, it was first broadcast on 1 September 1975 in Australia and 9 October 1975 in the UK. The final shooting script was dated 31 July 1974 and the episode was filmed between 7 and 21 August. The plot concerns the Moon's encounter with Voyager One, an Earth space probe with a dangerous power source.

== Plot ==
A space probe approaches the Moon transmitting the message "This is the voice of Voyager One, with greetings from the people of planet Earth." This causes consternation in Alpha's Main Mission, for Voyager is fitted with a Queller Drive: a propulsion system enabling high-velocity space travel through emission of fast neutrons. The probe's neutron field is extremely destructive to any objects within a certain distance – something that becomes clear when two Eagles sent to investigate the probe experience violent vibrations from the drive. One Eagle manages to pull away, but the other disintegrates.

Voyager was launched in 1985 to investigate faraway regions of space for signs of intelligent life and habitable solar systems. The dangers of the Queller Drive were shown when an accident with the drive on Voyager's sister probe, Voyager Two, caused the destruction of a lunar colony. Although it is decided to destroy Voyager, Professor Bergman argues that there must be a way to save the massive amount of data that the probe has gathered on its travels.

Dr Ernst Linden, a scientist working in Alpha's experimental laboratory, overhears that Voyager One has returned. He approaches Commander Koenig and reveals that he is in fact Dr Ernst Queller, inventor of the drive, who was given a new identity by Space Command following the Voyager Two disaster. Queller is asked if there are any means of overriding Voyager's security codes to enable instructions to be given shutting down the drive. While Queller attempts to hack the probe, his assistant Jim Haines, whose parents were among the Voyager Two victims, learns his true identity. He assaults Queller, who, despite his injury, manages to shut down Voyager with seconds to spare.

As the Alphans explore the captured Voyager, an image of an alien appears. He is Aarchon, Chief Justifier of the Worlds of Sidon. Aarchon explains that Sidon is seeking revenge for the millions on two of their worlds who were killed when the Queller Drive poisoned them. Three Sidonian warships approach Alpha, intending to destroy it. Aarchon will not listen to Koenig's protests that Alpha was not responsible for Voyager. As the Sidonians close in, Queller escapes from Medical, forces his way onto Voyager and launches the probe towards the ships. His pleas for mercy dismissed by Aarchon, Queller brings the probe within range of the ships and reactivates the drive – destroying the ships, Aarchon, the probe and himself.

== Writing ==
The story concept originated from a young writer named Joe Gannon, although his idea was more complicated. Writer Johnny Byrne used only the idea of a space probe from Earth encountering Alpha. He created the character of Queller, inspired by Wernher von Braun and "father of the hydrogen bomb" Edward Teller, saying "I saw [Queller] like one of these haunted Germans who has done things during the war and felt ashamed of them later and tried to atone in some way." Byrne said that he thought the story worked well and reflected "misty-eyed notions about mankind sending universal messages of love, hope and peace," as well as being a metaphor for Western civilisations sending missionaries to undeveloped countries to "civilise" them.

== Reception ==
"Voyager's Return" generally received positive reviews. SciFiNow magazine gave it 4 out of 5, writing that "a neat premise, plenty of action and a solid human element make this a fantastic episode." SFX rated it "B-plus", calling it "above average" for Series 1. The Guardian's Phelim O'Neill described "Voyager's Return" as a "typically imaginative episode" of Space: 1999.

Many reviews mentioned strong performances from the cast; according to TV Zone, "[b]asically it's a character piece; Queller has to come to terms with his remorse, his assistant Jim Haines has to come to terms with his hatred and the aliens have come for revenge. Some strong acting complements the strong storyline." Jeremy Kemp was especially well praised, Dreamwatch Bulletin commenting that the actor "turns in a magnificent performance as the guilt-ridden Queller." It noted that the story avoided sentimentality and gave the episode 9 out of 10.

John Kenneth Muir described the episode as "another high-quality Space: 1999 story that examines mankind's place in the universe", comparing Koenig and Russell's disagreement over what to do with Voyager to "a dialogue that would be repeated again and again between Dr Crusher and Captain Picard on Star Trek: The Next Generation." He wrote that the episode explores themes of "atonement, redemption, and even revenge". Steven D. Bloom of Hampden–Sydney College noted the "twofold" ethical dilemma facing the characters: Queller's trustworthiness, and weighing the value of the probe's data against the threat the probe represents.

Discussing the writing of the episode, Henry Keazor commented that the story "not only looks back at the people involved in pushing forward the technical progress of science, but it also casts a glance at the then still ongoing launch of probes, while fantasising about the possible consequences of such activities." He suggested that the twin Voyager probes were based on Pioneers 10 and 11, the real-life Voyager probes being unfinished and unnamed when the episode was written.
