= The Immunity Syndrome (Star Trek: The Original Series) =

- Star Trek: The Original Series episode
- Episode no.: Season 2 Episode 18
- Directed by: Joseph Pevney
- Written by: Robert Sabaroff
- Cinematography by: Jerry Finnerman
- Production code: 048
- Original air date: January 19, 1968

Guest appearances
- John Winston – Lt. Kyle; Frank da Vinci – Lt. Brent; Eddie Paskey – Lt. Leslie; William Blackburn – Lt. Hadley; Robert Johnson – Starfleet Voice

Episode chronology
← Previous "A Piece of the Action"	Next → "A Private Little War"
- Star Trek: The Original Series season 2

"The Immunity Syndrome" is the eighteenth episode of the second season of the American science fiction television series Star Trek. Written by Robert Sabaroff and directed by Joseph Pevney, it was first broadcast on January 19, 1968.

In the episode, the crew of the Enterprise encounters an energy-draining, space-dwelling organism.

== Plot ==
The Federation starship USS Enterprise, scheduled for rest and relaxation, receives a garbled message from Starfleet mentioning the USS Intrepid, a Federation starship crewed entirely by Vulcans. First Officer Spock suddenly looks shocked and announces that he felt the Intrepid "die". Starfleet then succeeds in making contact, and orders Captain Kirk to investigate the Gamma 7A system, the Intrepid's last known position. Ensign Chekov reports that the sensors show no life readings in the billion-inhabitant system.

Meanwhile, Spock is examined by Chief Medical Officer Dr. McCoy in sickbay, where he explains he felt the combined shock and terror in the minds of 400 fellow Vulcans aboard the Intrepid as they died. McCoy is amazed that Spock felt anything over the distance involved, but admits there is a lot about Vulcans he still doesn't understand.

Spock returns to the bridge just as Lt. Uhura announces she has lost contact with Starfleet. Kirk has Spock scan a dark zone that appears on the main viewscreen. Suddenly, half the crew are sickened or faint. Spock is unable to determine the nature of the zone, but suggests it is some kind of energy turbulence, and possibly responsible for the death of the system inhabitants and the Intrepid crew. Kirk has Chekov launch a sensor probe into the void. The probe transmits a piercing, high-pitched noise before contact with it is lost.

Kirk orders the ship into the zone, and as it enters, the piercing sound returns and all the stars disappear from the viewscreen. Dr. McCoy then reports that the crew are getting worse, and Chief Engineer Scott reports a loss of power. Spock surmises that the ship has entered a sort of negative energy field that interferes with biological and mechanical processes.

The Enterprise appears to accelerate of its own accord, and the ship's engines seem to operate in reverse: forward thrust slows the ship down. Kirk suggests that all available power be channeled into a massive forward thrust, in the hope of breaking free of the zone, but the effort succeeds only in bringing the ship to a halt.

Their quarry is finally revealed to be a gigantic, multicolored object resembling an amoeba. Kirk launches a sensor probe into it, which reveals that the object is indeed made of protoplasm, and alive. McCoy believes that a crewed probe must be sent into the creature to gather data needed to destroy it, and volunteers himself. Spock insists that he is better qualified. Kirk is reluctant to send either, arguing that it would be a suicide mission and that if anyone should go it should be he, the captain. But Spock points out that Kirk is not a science specialist and is much better served commanding the Enterprise.

Kirk is then forced to choose which of his two friends to send out, with a realistic probability he won't return. Kirk ultimately chooses Spock, agreeing that he is better equipped to handle the mission. Spock pilots the shuttle through the creature's outer membrane and makes his way toward the nucleus. Eventually, he reports that the creature is ready to reproduce, and suggests a method of destroying it, but the key part of the message is garbled. Kirk and McCoy meet to discuss the situation, and Kirk speculates that if the organism is like an invading virus, then an equivalent of "antibodies" is needed to destroy it.

Kirk takes the Enterprise into the creature's body, and orders Chief Engineer Scott to prepare an antimatter bomb with a timer set for a seven-minute delay. The bomb is fired into the cell's nucleus and the Enterprise backs out using what little power remains. With seconds remaining, Spock's shuttle is finally located and Kirk orders Scott to tow it with a tractor beam. With power levels nearly exhausted, the ship approaches the outer membrane just as the bomb explodes. Both the Enterprise and the shuttle are thrown clear of the organism as it is destroyed. The Enterprise is restored to full power and sustains only minor damage. Kirk, while glancing at a female yeoman, says he looks forward to recreation.

== Music ==
Music from the episode "The Doomsday Machine" was reused in this episode.

== Production and reception ==
When this episode was filmed, George Takei was filming The Green Berets and therefore unavailable to portray his character, Lt. Sulu. John Winston's character, Lt. Kyle, occupied Sulu's helmsman's seat, wearing a gold command tunic instead of his usual red engineering tunic that he wore as transporter chief. However, Kirk repeatedly mispronounced his name in this episode as "Cowell".

Robert J. Sawyer of TrekMovie.com felt the episode reminded him too much of other "mindless giant space thingy threatening the galaxy" episodes, but praised the interaction of McCoy and Spock.
