= Johnny Byrne (writer) =

Irish screenwriter, script editor, and poet

- Born: John Christopher Byrne; 27 November 1935; Dublin, Ireland
- Died: 2 April 2008 (aged 72); Norwich, Norfolk, England
- Resting place: Heydon, Norfolk
- Occupations: Television writer; screenwriter; script editor; writer; poet
- Spouse: Sandy Carrington-Mails (m. 1975)
- Children: 3
- Writing career
- Language: English
- Period: 1960s–2005
- Genres: Science fiction, drama
- Notable works: Created Heartbeat and Noah's Ark; Wrote for Space: 1999, All Creatures Great and Small, Tales of the Unexpected and Doctor Who.

John Christopher Byrne (27 November 1935 – 2 April 2008) was an Irish television screenwriter and script editor. He travelled extensively in his youth as a travelling poet. During the 1960s he worked as a literary editor, and wrote short stories that were published in Science Fantasy magazine.

Byrne's other works include the novel Groupie (1969, co-written with Jenny Fabian), the BBC "Wednesday Play" Season of the Witch (1971), and the scripts for the films Adolf Hitler: My Part in His Downfall (1972, co-written with original author Spike Milligan and Norman Cohen), and Rosie Is My Relative (1976). He was script editor of the TV series All Creatures Great and Small (1976, 1978, 1985, 1988–1990), writing 29 episodes, and also produced scripts for One by One (1987). Byrne was the creator of the TV drama series Heartbeat (which was loosely based on the Constable books by Nicholas Rhea), writing 23 episodes for 17 series between 1992 and 2005. He also created and wrote for Noah's Ark (1997–98).

== Space: 1999 ==
Byrne was the most prolific scriptwriter for the first series of Space: 1999 (1973–75), and was initially assigned the role of creative consultant for the second season (1976–77). However, hoping to make a greater impact on the American market, the producers desired a consultant from the United States, and the job was subsequently given to Fred Freiberger.

Byrne's scripts for series one of Space: 1999 were "Matter of Life and Death" (based on a draft by Art Wallace), "Another Time, Another Place", "Force of Life", "Voyager's Return" (based on an idea by Joe Gannon), "End of Eternity", "The Troubled Spirit", "Mission of the Darians", and "The Testament of Arkadia". For series two, he wrote "The Metamorph", "The Immunity Syndrome", and "The Dorcons".

== Doctor Who ==
Byrne is also known for his contributions to the British science-fiction TV series Doctor Who. The first of his three scripted and screened stories was The Keeper of Traken (1981), which resurrected the Master and served as the first instalment in a trilogy of stories (continuing with Logopolis and Castrovalva) involving the character. For the same story, Byrne created the character of Nyssa, who the production chose to retain as a companion.

Byrne's second story, Arc of Infinity (1983), featured the Time Lord villain Omega, who had first appeared in The Three Doctors a decade earlier. His final screened story was Warriors of the Deep (1984), which saw the return of monsters the Silurians and the Sea Devils.

In 1991, Byrne wrote the final draft script for an unmade Doctor Who movie called Doctor Who: Last of the Time Lords.

== Personal life ==
Byrne left Ireland for the United Kingdom in 1956. For a time, he worked as a teacher of English as a foreign language in various cities in Europe. In 1975 he married Sandy Carrington-Mail, with whom he had three sons.

== Death ==
Byrne died in 2008, aged 72. He last resided, and is buried in, Heydon, Norfolk.
