= Martin Bower =

British model maker and designer

- Born: 1952 (age 73–74)
- Occupations: Miniature model-maker; Special effects artist
- Years active: 1969–present
- Known for: Alien (1979); Flash Gordon (1980); Outland (1981)
- Television: Space: 1999 (1975–1978); Blake's 7 (1978–1981)
- Website: Official website

Martin Bower (born 1952) is a British miniature model-maker and special effects artist for film and television. He built 50 scale models for the TV series Space: 1999.

His other credits include the TV series The Tomorrow People (1973–1979), Blake's 7 (1978–1981), The Hitchhiker's Guide to the Galaxy (1981), Doctor Who and The Tripods (1984–1985), as well as the films The Medusa Touch (1978), Alien (1979), Flash Gordon (1980) and Outland (1981).

He has a long-standing professional relationship with effects director Brian Johnson.

== Notable designs ==
=== Blake's 7 ===
- The Liberator models, and the teleport bracelets, as seen in multiple episodes of the series

=== Space: 1999 ===
- Mark IX Hawk in "War Games"
- Ultra Probe in "Dragon's Domain"
- Laser Tank model in "The Infernal Machine"
- Super Swift model in "The Bringers of Wonder"
- Voyager One model in "Voyager's Return"

=== The Tripods ===
- Models of the eponymous tripods used throughout the two series
