= Annie Lambert =

British actress (born 1946)

- Born: 3 January 1946 (age 80)
- Occupation: Actress
- Known for: Doctor Who (1982)

Annie Lambert (born 3 January 1946) is a British actress, best known to fans of the science fiction television series Doctor Who for her role as Enlightenment in the 1982 serial Four to Doomsday.

She grew up in East Sussex and her first work in London was as a fashion assistant at Vogue, but several of the photographers she worked with persuaded her to sit for them, and she soon moved into acting. She is the younger half-sister of Kit Lambert, who was the manager of The Who.

== Filmography ==
- The Sweeney
- Space: 1999
- The New Avengers
- All Creatures Great and Small
- Bluebell
- Inspector Morse
- Poirot
- Rockliffe's Babies
- Howards' Way
- Lovejoy
- Minder
- Making News
- The Old Boy Network
- Westbeach
- 2point4 Children
