= WMG Academy for Young Engineers =

See:

- WMG Academy for Young Engineers, Coventry
- WMG Academy for Young Engineers, Solihull
