= Lee-style tai chi =

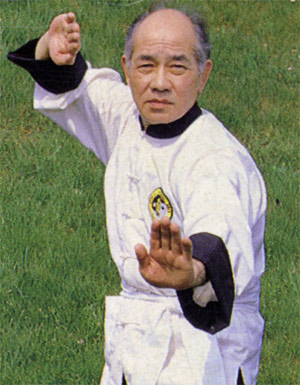
Chee Soo practicing the Lee style T'ai Chi Dance

The Lee style of tai chi (李氏太極拳) is closely related to a range of disciplines of Taoist Arts taught within the Lee style including Qigong, Daoyin, Ch'ang Ming, Traditional Chinese Medicine, Taoist alchemy, Feng Shou kung fu, and weapons practice. According to practitioners, it was first brought to the West in the 1930s by Chan Kam Lee and was subsequently popularized by Chee Soo who was the President of the International Taoist Society from 1958 until his death in 1994. The Lee style of tai chi comprises two forms known as 'the dance' (跳舞; tiàowǔ) and 'the form'. Other exercises include Yifu Shou or 'sticky hands', Whirling Hands, Whirling Arms, and various qi and Li development exercises. Lee style t'ai chi is related to Martial Arts training, and there are five distinct areas of development that comprise the whole Art:

1. Physical
2. Mental
3. Breathing
4. Sheng Qi (生气; Internal energy)
5. Ching Sheng Li (精生力; External energy).

== History ==
According to Chee Soo the Lee style is the only true Taoist art and the oldest form of tai chi in existence. It is derived from an original set of eight movements created by Ho-Hsieh Lee from Beijing at the beginning of the Western Zhou dynasty around 1000 BC. His family moved to a fishing village called Weihaiwei on the East coast of China in Shandong Province and settled there and practised a range of Taoist Arts. The techniques were passed on from one generation to the next and kept within the family until the last in their line, Chan Kam Lee, fled the war torn China of the 1930s and emigrated to London to establish a business in the jewel trade. Here he met and adopted a young orphan named Chee Soo, and he passed the techniques on to him as he had no children of his own.

In 1977 Chee Soo was interviewed by Brian Hayes on LBC radio and talked about Lee-style tai chi, and meeting his teacher Chan Kam Lee:

Chee Soo: It's rather curious, by a very strange coincidence, probably another Chinese fairy tale really. When I left Doctor Barnardo homes at fourteen years of age I became a page boy in Earl's Court in a nursing home, and I used to go over to Hyde Park and have a kick around on my day off on Sundays, and I happened to be playing with my ball when my ball actually hit the back of the head of a gentleman sitting on a park bench.

Interviewer: Who was doing these gentle movements.

Chee Soo: No he was sitting there, just sitting there very quietly, and I went over to retrieve my ball, and I came up to the front of him to apologise, and I saw he was Chinese, and we got talking and he was an importer/exporter, very much alone he had no family, and I was of course actually an orphan and having no family of my own, and the friendship gradually grew and grew, and till eventually in actual fact after many meetings he invited me to his club in Holborn, Red Lion Square, which he had a little club meeting three or four times a week, and from then on I practised under him almost continuously.

According to a British Movietone News documentary filmed on 21 May 1970 at Guildford in Surrey - UK, Chee Soo had over 2000 students studying Wu Shu in Britain as part of the British Wu Shu Association.

In 1976 a book about Lee-style tai chi written by Chee Soo was published entitled The Chinese Art of T'ai Chi Ch'uan which describes the history and philosophy of the style in detail including descriptions of each aspect of the Art with photographs and descriptions of the Lee-style tai chi form. Chee Soo wrote several books about the various aspects of the Lee style Taoist Arts published by HarperCollins which became best-sellers and were subsequently licensed by HarperCollins to other major international publishers and translated into various languages including French (distributed in Canada, France, Belgium, Switzerland, Portugal), German, Italian, Spanish, Portuguese (Brazilian), Polish, and Indonesian.

According to an interview with Marilyn Soo - Chee Soo's widow and the President of the International Taoist Society - Chee Soo moved to Coventry in the 1980s and trained a group of teachers to continue his work teaching the Lee style Taoist Arts.

Since his death in August 1994 there are now several schools teaching the Lee-style tai chi based in the British Isles each of which emphasise different aspects of the Lee style Taoist Arts.

The emblem of the Lee family is the Seahorse which represents Yin within Yang as it is the only creature where the male incubates and gives birth to the offspring.

== Qigong ==
Chee Soo's tai chi classes invariably included Qigong or energy cultivation, and Daoyin or breathing exercises. The Lee style qigong exercises are called K'ai Men (开门) or 'Open Door'. Chee Soo wrote a book in 1983 under the title Chinese Yoga (later re-titled "Taoist Yoga"), which was devoted entirely to this aspect of the Arts. This book contains details of Taoist alchemy energy cultivation methods involving deep breathing into the dantian or "Golden Stove" or "Lower Cauldron" in order to stimulate the flow of qi or internal energy, circulating it through various energy centres located along the meridians and vessels which are usually associated with acupuncture and known as the Microcosmic orbit. Various types of breathing exercises are described and categorized in terms of Yin and Yang breathing and recommendations are given in terms of regulating the body in accordance with the peak of energy flowing through each organ and its corresponding line of meridian depending on the time of day and season of the year. There are also various recommendations for constant good health regarding the Chang Ming diet or Chinese food therapy based on the underlying principles of Traditional Chinese Medicine.
An important aspect of this style of qigong is that it not only deals with qi or internal energy but also teaches the practitioner to supplement their personal store of ch'i with energy drawn from the energy field of the Universe itself which Chee Soo called external energy or 'Ching Sheng Li' (jīng shēng lì 精生力).

== Forms ==
The Lee style includes a number of forms comprising set sequences of movements. These movements are based upon fourteen basic stances which are named after animal movements. These stances are also grouped into sequences with names like "Drive the Tiger Away" and "The Fair Lady Weaving". The movements can be performed at various speeds and may be timed with breathing. There are two forms, one known as the tai chi dance that is about 400 years old, and the tai chi form itself, known as 'The Form'. The etymology of the Chinese character wu (Wu 舞) suggests that the Lee-style tai chi dance may have its origins in Wu shamanism. The dance is 185 stances or steps long whereas the form is 140 stances split into 42 sequences.

== Sticky Hands ==
The Lee style also includes various partner exercises for two or three people, the most important of which is called "sticky hands" (Yīfù shǒu 依附手). Two people stand opposite each other making contact on the back of the wrist and move in circles gently testing each other's balance. The emphasis is on sensitivity and yielding to force.

I Fu Shou is an exercise in which two people participate. Each person tries to upset the balance of the other whilst maintaining their own stability. Contact is through the arms and hands throughout the exercise. No matter what stance is adopted, there may always be a weakness in the balance of the body whether one moves left or right, backward or forward, upward or downward, and it is by taking advantage of these six directional weaknesses that the participants in I Fu Shou try to ‘uproot’ each other - to cause the other to lose their footing. The most difficult way to do this is to lift the other off the ground, but even this may be achieved provided that one has practiced diligently and developed a faultless technique.

A full description is available to read online on Chee Soo's publisher's website.

== Self-defence ==
Whirling Arms and Whirling Hands are the two exercises in the Lee style of tai chi which are used to teach basic principles of self-defence.

Like I fou shou, Whirling Arms (Lun Pei) and Whirling Hands (Lun Shou) encourage the development of quick mental and physical reactions and a high level of sensitivity. Both are characterized, as their names suggest, by circular movements of the arms and hands.
The two arts include techniques to ward off, parry and deflect thrusts which may be made towards your body, and with constant practise you can develop the ability to recognize your partner's intentions before they are carried out. You will learn how to feel and exploit the weaknesses in their movements and postures, and in so doing you will come to understand your own weaknesses and develop greater concentration and awareness. You will build the foundations for a stronger balance, learn how to synchronize your body movements, and become much more sensitive and perceptive. In addition to all these, the control and utilization of your Ch'i energy plays a very big part in your practise.

== Weapons ==
Taijijian
According to Master Chee Soo in his book about the Lee-style tai chi:

T'ai Chi sword makes full use of the combined techniques of Whirling Hands and Whirling Arms, but these are made more difficult by the weight and length of the sword. Greater mental concentration is required to retain complete control of the arms, wrists and hands, while maintaining perfect balance, especially in a few sequences where the body makes a complete whirl to demonstrate the 'order of the universe'....the 'Sword' form, which comprises 216 movements, has no straight lines

Tai Chi stick
Lee style tai chi stick comprises a form of 270 movements. The tai chi stick is a staff approximately six feet long.
