= Chee Soo =

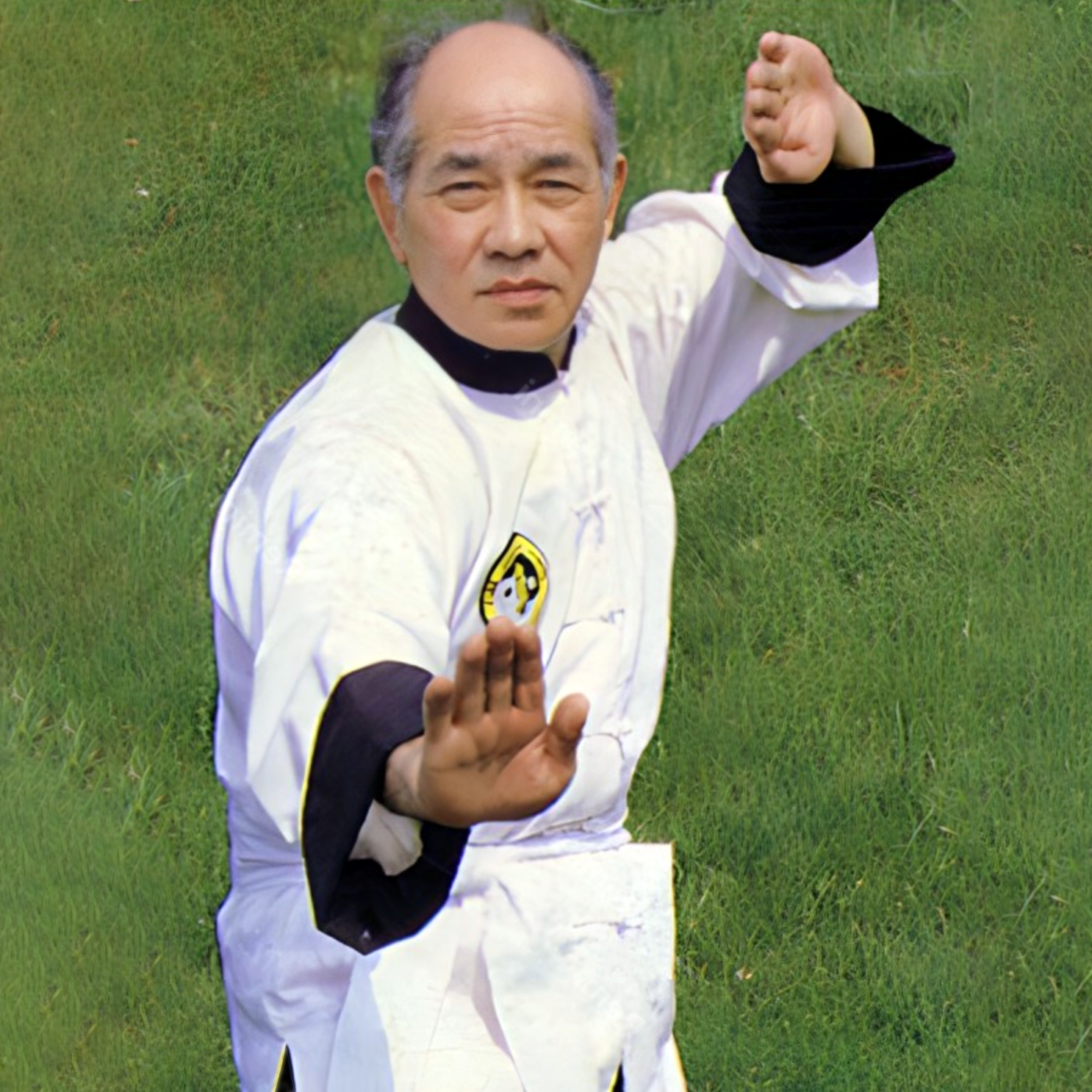
- Chee Soo performing the Lee-style tai chi dance
- Born: Clifford Soo; 4 June 1919; Marylebone, London, England
- Died: 29 August 1994 (aged 75)
- Style: Lee-style tai chi

Other information
- Occupation: Author, soldier, herbalist, martial artist

Chee Soo (born Clifford Soo, also known as Clifford Gibbs, 4 June 1919 – 29 August 1994) was an author of books about the philosophy of Taoism and in particular Lee-style tai chi, qigong, Ch'ang Ming, Traditional Chinese Medicine and Feng Shou 'Hand of the Wind' kung fu.

== Biography ==
=== Early life ===
Born on 4 June 1919 in All Souls, Marylebone, London, Chee Soo was the son of Ah Chee Soo, a Chinese seaman and a pastry chef at the Westminster restaurant. His English mother was Beatrice Annie Alice Gibbs. They lived in Westminster. Although he enlisted in the British Army under the name Clifford Gibbs, his mother's maiden name, in later life he took his father's name and was known as Chee Soo. In a 1977 LBC radio interview Chee Soo described meeting a Chinese Martial Arts teacher from Shandong called Chan Kam Lee in Hyde Park when he was fourteen years old. Chee Soo said he was invited to Chan Lee's class in the summer of 1934, and this was the beginning of his martial arts training. Chee Soo said that Chan Kam Lee adopted him as a nephew, and taught him the arts whenever his work and time permitted.

=== Military career ===
In 1937 Chee Soo joined the 2nd Battalion of the Royal Tank Regiment part of the 7th Armoured division known as the Desert rats. During the Second World War, he was promoted to Lance-Corporal and Corporal in 1941, then to "Acting Serjeant" in 1942. He was awarded the Military Medal after the Battle of Beda Fomm in Libya in February 1941, part of Operation Compass. After his regiment were transferred to Burma he was captured by the Japanese on 19 April 1942 during the Battle of Yenangyaung and forced to work on the Death Railway as a POW where he contracted Malaria, he was later classified as a war crimes witness:

In 1939 the Second World War broke out, and Chee Soo did his share of fighting as a Tank Commander in the Second Battalion of the Royal Tank Corps, in France, in North Africa — where he won the Military Medal, and in Burma where, after a hectic battle, he was finally taken prisoner by the Japanese. He went through many periods of beatings, torture, starvation and very hard work as a member of a working party in the mountains between India and Burma. Finally, three years later, as the Japanese started to retreat from the advancing Allies, he managed to escape into the Shan Mountains of West Burma and made his way over very rugged terrain and through many jungles, till finally one month afterwards he was able to make contact with the Allies again. Three months after recuperation and treatment (for he then weighed only 84 lbs), he was flown back to England, where he was able to enjoy a long leave with his wife. After that, he was discharged from the forces and took a course in book-keeping, stock control, commercial history and sales promotion. Chee Soo claimed that he managed to make contact with Chan Lee again after the war was finished, and the class in Holborn was restarted. In 1950, Chee Soo formed his own class in Manor Road School, West Ham, East London.

The author Rupert Croft-Cooke who was Chee's friend from 1938 provides us with some biographical details of this period in Chee Soo's life in his book 'The Dogs of Peace'.

Clifford Gibbs had got his rather grand name from Dr Barnardo's Homes, for he had been reared in one of these, the son of a Chinese father and English mother, neither of whom he had ever seen. I had known him before the war and was as proud as he was of the Military Medal he had earned as a Corporal in the Royal Armoured Corps in North Africa. He had been sent to Burma and taken prisoner by the Japanese, and suffered unspeakable tortures and humiliations because of his race, separated as he was from his fellow British. He had survived and, inwardly as inscrutable as a Conrad character, a little like Wang in Victory, he had married a blonde English girl and had an exquisite baby daughter whose godfather I became at a Sunday afternoon service in an East End Anglican church. Clifford, who went about life methodically, was severely industrious and found the means of saving for his family even in those days of grudging wages. But he had a humorous cheerful side to his character and enlivened my flat during his weekly visits between office hours and his return to Durban Street, E.15. He was an expert wrestler and had earned the Judo black belt. Only from the depths of his character emerged sometimes the exotic or oriental; in speech and manner he was very much an Englishman, and it was strange to hear from his curved lips words that might have been used by any London ex-soldier. I am glad to have had his friendship throughout those years.

=== Teaching the Taoist Arts ===
Chee Soo said that after the death of his teacher Chan Kam Lee, he went on to become the President of the International Taoist Society and taught a variety of martial arts ranging from self-defence techniques to healing and spiritual disciplines based on Chinese Medicine, ch'i kung and meditation.

Chee Soo's daughter Lavinia Soo-Warr adds that Chee Soo began learning Judo and Kendo in London after World War 2, and followed this up with training in Aikido with Kenshiro Abbe after his arrival in London in 1955. This history states that Chee Soo "switched back to the Chinese arts", possibly influenced by his negative experiences as a Japanese prisoner-of-war during WW2. Lavinia states that Chee Soo began teaching a small group in Dunstable in "Ch'i Shu". This is probably the Aikido-influenced system which Chee Soo demonstrates and is called "Qi Shu" or "Chinese Aikido" in contemporary Movietone footage. The history says that later "as the Chi'Shu and Kung Fu systems became more popular, he introduced [tai chi] and the Chang Ming Diet", which suggests that Chee Soo was not teaching tai chi up to this point. Lavinia's history says that Chee Soo changed his teachings fundamentally "at least three times" during his teaching career.

According to Chee Soo, Chan Lee died in the winter of 1953–4 off the coast of China, near Canton, when the ship he was travelling in sank in a severe storm, and he was asked to take over the leadership of the association. Since then the association has grown in The British Isles, Australia, South Africa, France, Germany, the Netherlands, Mauritius and New Zealand.

Chee Soo taught 'The Eight Strands of the Brocade', comprising :

- Ch'ang Ming — Taoist long life health diet therapy
- Ts'ao Yao — Taoist herbal therapy
- Anmo — Taoist massage
- Tao Yin – Taoist respiration therapy
- Tien Chen — Taoist Acupressure (Spot Pressing)
- Chen Tuan — Taoist diagnosis techniques
- Chili Nung — (The way of occlusion)

There are two associations which are affiliated to the Chinese Cultural Arts Association and the International Wu Shu Association.

The Chinese Cultural Arts Association teach :

- Tai chi — The Supreme Ultimate
- K'ai Men — (Taoist Yoga or the Taoist form of qigong)
- I Fu Shou — (Sticky Hands)
- Li Kung — (Taoist development of Li energy)
- Mo Kun — (Taoist Wand for Li energy control)
- Mo Hsiang — (Taoist Meditation)
- Tai chi Dance
- Tai chi Stick
- Tai chi sword

The International Wu Shu Association teach:

- Feng Shou — (‘Hand of the Wind' Kung fu, very soft, very gentle, and very fast, and suitable for women and men of all ages).
- Chi Shu — (A form of self defence with throws & breakfalls similar to Aikido, which Chee Soo studied after World War 2 )
- Tao Shu (Sword)
- Kan Shu (Stick/Spear)

Chee Soo, Diana Rigg and Film Stunt arranger Ray Austin worked together on The Avengers TV series

Chee Soo was also involved as a fight choreographer with the TV series The Avengers during the 1960s as is evidenced by publicity photographs of him with Ray Austin (himself a Black Belt third dan Kung Fu Master and pupil of Soo's) and Diana Rigg probably taken around 1967. He brought Kung Fu before a western audience years before Bruce Lee had even been heard of.
The Guinness world record site states that "In 1965, Dame Diana Rigg (UK) became the first western actress to perform kung fu on Television when the combat choreographers Ray Austin (UK) and Chee Soo (UK/China) worked elements of the martial art into her fight scenes on The Avengers. Certificate presentation was done on The New Paul O'Grady Show."

During the 1970s he ran a Chinese Health and Herbal clinic in London.

According to a British Movietone News documentary filmed on 21 May 1970 at Guildford in Surrey – UK, Chee Soo had over 2000 students studying Wu Shu in Britain as part of the British Wu Shu Association, and was one of only three men outside of Beijing qualified to teach Wu Shu.

Chee Soo appeared in a BBC Nationwide TV interview on 21 September 1973 where he demonstrated Kung fu self-defence techniques and inner power live in the studio with presenter Bob Wellings. Chee Soo talked about the history of Kung Fu and the difference between Northern and Southern kung fu styles in China and how it differs from Karate.

In 1975 Chee Soo was filmed by the BBC at his Feng shou kung fu class in Seymour Hall in London and subsequently appeared in a documentary broadcast for schools entitled Scene:Looking for a fight. His soft style kung fu self-defence class was contrasted with boxing and hard style kung fu.

In 1977 he was interviewed by Brian Hayes on LBC radio and talked about Lee-style tai chi, meeting his teacher Chan Kam Lee and Reincarnation.

=== Writings ===
According to an interview with Marilyn Soo who is Chee Soo's widow, during the 1980s he moved to Coventry and spent his time writing and teaching courses in Lee-style tai chi and Feng Shou kung fu at the Alderman Callow School in Coventry (now called The Westwood Academy) and other locations around Britain, as well as visiting some of his students overseas in places like Australia and around Europe. Chee Soo was the author of five books published during his lifetime and one book published posthumously about Taoist philosophy. He died in Ebbw Vale on 29 August 1994 as a result of an abdominal aneurism caused by Deep vein thrombosis probably aggravated by several long haul plane flights during the previous two years.

== Books ==
Chee Soo's books were first published in hardback by Gordon and Cremonesi from 1976, then by Aquarian Press (Thorsons/HarperCollins) from 1983 who published reprints throughout the 1980s which topped the best sellers listings for several years. They have been translated into various languages including Portuguese (Brazilian), Polish, German, French (distributed in Canada, France, Belgium, Switzerland, Portugal), Indonesian, Spanish, and Italian and published throughout the world. His books are now published by Seahorse Books.

- Soo, Chee (2003). The Chinese Art of T'ai Chi Ch'uan. Seahorse Books. ISBN 978-0-9545244-0-1.
  First published by Gordon and Cremonesi in 1976 (ISBN 0860330370). This book was republished by the Aquarian Press, Wellingborough, Northants in 1984 (Thorsons/HarperCollins), (ISBN 0850303877) and the same edition with minor changes and a new cover is now published by Seahorse Books (ISBN 978-0-9545244-0-1). This book describes the Lee-style of tai chi which Chee Soo – by his own account – learned from Chan Lee who was the last member of the Lee family and who came to London to trade precious stones in the 1930s. There is a detailed history of the Lee-style and over 150 black and white photographs and descriptions detailing the Lee-style tai chi 'form' as well as explanations of Taoist philosophy and partner exercises such as I fou Shou or 'sticky hands'.
- Soo, Chee (2006). The Taoist Art of K'ai Men. Seahorse Books. ISBN 978-0-9545244-1-8.
  First published by Gordon and Cremonesi in 1977 under the title "The Chinese Art of K'ai Men" and then reprinted by Aquarian Press (Thorsons/HarperCollins) under the title "Taoist Yoga" in 1983, now published by Seahorse Books (ISBN 978-0-9545244-1-8) describes the Taoist Ch'i gung exercises and Breathing exercises taught by Chee Soo.
- Soo, Chee (2006). The Taoist Art of Feng Shou. Seahorse Books. ISBN 978-0-9545244-2-5.
  First published by Aquarian Press (Thorsons/HarperCollins) in 1983 (ISBN 0850303605) now published by Seahorse Books (ISBN 978-0-9545244-2-5) describes in Chee Soo's own words the Lee-style of Feng Shou or "Hand of the Wind" kung fu or wu shu self-defence training as taught by Chee Soo.
- Soo, Chee (2008). The Tao of Long Life. Seahorse Books. ISBN 978-0-9545244-3-2.
  First published by Gordon and Cremonesi in 1979 (ISBN 0860330680) later published by Aquarian Press (Thorsons/HarperCollins). This book describes the natural foods diet and some Chinese Medicine techniques Chee Soo taught in his health and massage classes and has now been re-printed by Seahorse Books (ISBN 978-0-9545244-3-2).
- Soo, Chee (2011). The Taoist Ways of Healing. Seahorse Books). ISBN 978-0-9545244-4-9.
  First published by Aquarian Press (Thorsons/HarperCollins) in 1986 (ISBN 085030475X) This book describes Taoist Healing methods including massage, acupressure and diagnostic techniques of Chinese Medicine, now published by Seahorse Books (ISBN 978-0-9545244-4-9)
- Soo, Chee (2006). The Tao of My Thoughts. Seahorse Books. ISBN 978-0-9545244-5-6.
  First published by Seahorse Books in 2006 (ISBN 978-0-9545244-5-6) - is a diary of Chee Soo's thoughts regarding Taoist philosophy written down over eight years from 1976 to 1984, it is a guide for those interested in pursuing the study of Taoist philosophy in their daily lives.
