= Shirley's World =

Television series from ITC entertainment

- Created by: Frank Tarloff and Melville Shavelson
- Directed by: Ray Austin
- Starring: Shirley MacLaine; John Gregson
- Opening theme: Laurie Johnson
- Composer: Laurie Johnson
- Country of origin: United Kingdom
- Original language: English
- No. of series: 1
- No. of episodes: 17 (list of episodes)

Production
- Executive producers: Sheldon Leonard in association with Ronald Robin
- Producers: Raymond Auystin, Barry Delmaine
- Editor: Keith Palmer
- Running time: 25mins
- Production company: ITC Entertainment

Original release
- Network: ABC, ITV
- Release: 15 September 1971 – 5 January 1972

Shirley's World is a television series that aired on ABC during the 1971–72 television season. The sitcom was co-produced by the British ITC Entertainment and American producer Sheldon Leonard, with English producer-director Ray Austin; it starred Shirley MacLaine as a photojournalist and John Gregson as her editor at World Illustrated magazine.

Three months after the ABC broadcasts ended, the seventeen-episode series was aired in its entirety on ITV in the United Kingdom.

== Cast and characters ==
- Shirley MacLaine as Shirley Logan
- John Gregson as Dennis Croft

== Episode list ==
Filmed on location and at Pinewood Studios England

Production # is the order of the Network DVD.

No.	Title	Directed by	Written by	Original release date	UK airdate	Prod. code
1	"The Berkley Club Caper"	Ralph Levy	Frank Tarloff	15 September 1971	7 April 1972	101
Shirley Logan arrives in London to take up her new job at World Illustrated and her new boss, Dennis Croft, gives her the task of interviewing Sir Harold Willbright-Manners at his club. The members are aghast and she is thrown out. Croft had not told her it was men only club even though he was a member. Undaunted Logan recruits a number of striptease artists and they invade the club while she takes photos of the men in embarrassing situations. She gets the interview and the members order copies of their photos reassured the negatives will be destroyed. Stars Charles Lloyd-Pack and Erik Chitty.
2	"Thou Shalt Not be Found Out"	Ray Austin	Peter Miller	22 September 1971	14 April 1972	103
Sent to interview a self-righteous sanctimonious actor going through a divorce because his wife was unfaithful Shirley decides to spoil the story, to the displeasure of Croft, by reconciling the marriage by pretending to his wife that she is his other woman. Stars Nigel Davenport Lelia Goldoni Jeremy Lloyd and Cardew Robinson (uncredited)
3	"The Defective Defector"	Ray Austin	John Muir and Brian Degas	29 September 1971	21 April 1972	109
4	"The Lovers"	Ray Austin	Peter Miller	6 October 1971	28 April 1972	107
From a tear on a photograph Shirley breaks up the arranged marriage of the children of two Japanese businessmen but the couple realise they love each other and Shirley has to undo what she has done. Stars Akiko Wakabayashi
5	"The Islanders"	Charles Crichton	Lew Schwarz	13 October 1971	5 May 1972	108
On a remote island in Scotland Shirley lets slip to a tax inspector about their illicit homemade whisky which causes the islanders to declare independence and Shirley leads the resistance against first the army, then the navy until the Prime Minister sends Dennis Croft to sort it out. Stars Peter Dyneley and Sally Thomsett Filming Date: 21 July 1971
6	"The Colonel"	Ray Austin	Peter Miller	20 October 1971	12 May 1972	110
7	"To Dream the Impossible Dream"	Ralph Levy	Phillip Mishkin and Rob Reiner	27 October 1971	19 May 1972	102
Shirley tries to help a pavement artist receive the recognition his talent deserves but despite her best efforts only succeeds in denting the man's confidence. Stars Ron Moody Nicky Henson
8	"A Hell of an Engineer"	Ray Austin	Lew Schwarz	3 November 1971	26 May 1972	106
Photographing Temples in Japan Shirley meets a farmer working as a taxi driver with dreams of becoming an engineer. Going to his farm she meets his wife who secretly repairs all the farm machines while he prays. Her promise to make the taxi driver an engineer seems impossible to fulfill. Stars Burt Kwouk, Joss Ackland and Yasuko Nagazumi.
9	"The Reunion"	Frank Cvitanovich	Peter Miller	10 November 1971	2 June 1972	111
10	"Follow that Rickshaw"	Ralph Levy	Tom Brennard and Roy Bottomley	17 November 1971	9 June 1972	114
11	"A Mother's Touch"	Leslie Norman	Richard DeRoy	24 November 1971	16 June 1972	105
Sent to interview a reclusive tycoon Shirley discovers he has a love of painting but his protective mother ties him up in the business of making money as his secret advisor and that he is merely a puppet doing her bidding. Stars James Booth, Patrick Newell and Dandy Nichols
12	"A Girl Like You"	Ray Austin	Anthony Skene	1 December 1971	23 June 1972	104
On assignment in Japan Shirley meets a young honeymooning couple where the husband is more interested in the Japanese sights and customs. Shirley dresses as a geisha at a teahouse and with the other girls performs a tale of the neglected wife. Stars Rodney Bewes, Una Stubbs and Yoki Tani
13	"Evidence in Camera"	Ralph Levy	T. E. B. Clarke	8 December 1971	30 June 1972	115
14	"The Rally"	Peter Hunt	Peter Miller	15 December 1971	4 July 1972	116
15	"Figuratively Speaking"	Ralph Levy	Patrick Alexander	22 December 1971	11 July 1972	117
16	"Knightmare"	Peter Sasdy	Jeremy Burnham	29 December 1971	18 July 1972	112
17	"Always Leave Them Laughing"	Sydney Hayers	Jack Seddon and David Pursall	5 January 1972	25 July 1972	113
