= At Risk (1994 film) =

- Directed by: Elana K. Pyle
- Written by: Elana K. Pyle; David E. Pyle
- Produced by: Kari Nevil; David E. Pyle
- Starring: Elana K Plye; Kim Meyers; Daniel McDonald; Vince Vaughn
- Cinematography: David Scardina
- Edited by: James Philip Curtis; Robert Grahamjones
- Music by: Kevin Hedges
- Release date: 1994
- Running time: 95 minutes
- Country: United States
- Language: English

At Risk is a 1994 American romantic drama film directed by and starring Elana Krausz. The film also stars Kim Meyers, Daniel McDonald, and Vince Vaughn.

== Plot ==
Lara spends a year in Mexico unsuccessfully trying to save her marriage to Steven. She returns to the United States to find Max, her lover, who has AIDS.

== Cast ==
- Elana K. Pyle (aka Elana Krausz) as Lara Wade
- Daniel McDonald as Steven Wade
- Kim Meyers as Jennifer Rich
- Vince Vaughn as Max Nolan
- Shirley Anne Field as Mrs. Nolan
- Randy Travis as Ellison
- Matthew Flint as Mark

== Reception ==
Variety said, "In its present form and shape, “At Risk” is so underdeveloped that it needs substantial work before it’s shown to the public again. Helmer Pyle seems to lack technical knowledge of such vital points as camera placement and movement, lighting and framing. The acting is almost uniformly unpolished and, except for Hedges’ serviceable music, tech credits are on the raw side."
