= West Midlands Collaborative Commerce Marketplace =

The West Midlands Collaborative Commerce Marketplace (WMCCM) is an online marketplace that promotes the services of small-medium-sized engineering enterprises (engineering SMEs) in the English county West Midlands. It is financed by the European Regional Development Fund, based within WMG, University of Warwick at Coventry. The marketplace was founded by Professor Jay Bal with Dr Mark Swift. As of 2006, 2,000 firms had joined the website.
