= Canley =

Neighbourhood in Coventry, England

Coordinates: 52.39599°N 1.54890°W

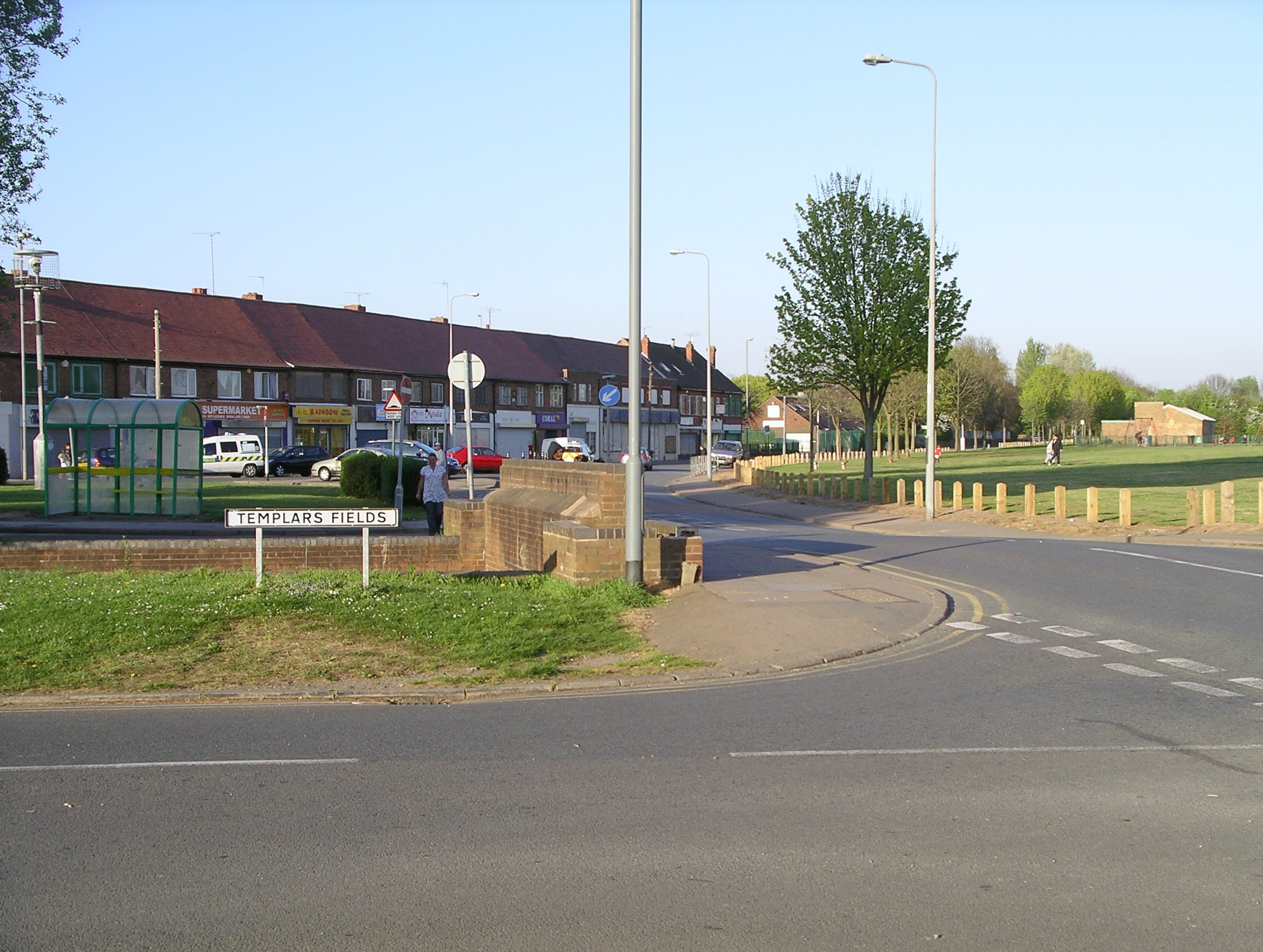
- Shops on Prior Deram Walk and the playing field, Canley

- Location within the West Midlands
- Metropolitan borough: Coventry
- Metropolitan county: West Midlands
- Region: West Midlands
- Country: England
- Sovereign state: United Kingdom
- Post town: COVENTRY
- Postcode district: CV4
- Dialling code: 024
- UK Parliament: Coventry South

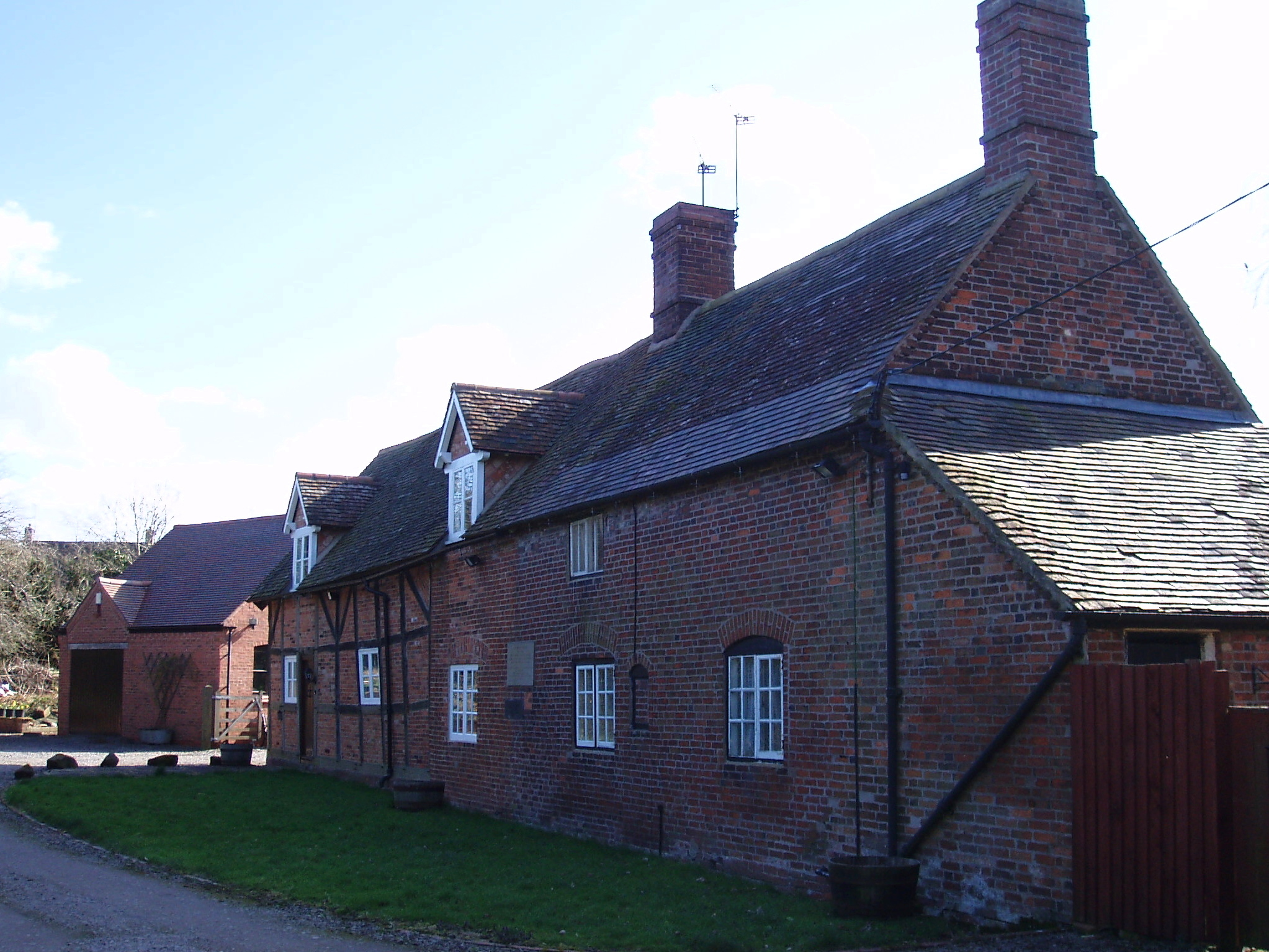
Sir Henry Parkes' Birthplace, Moat House Lane.

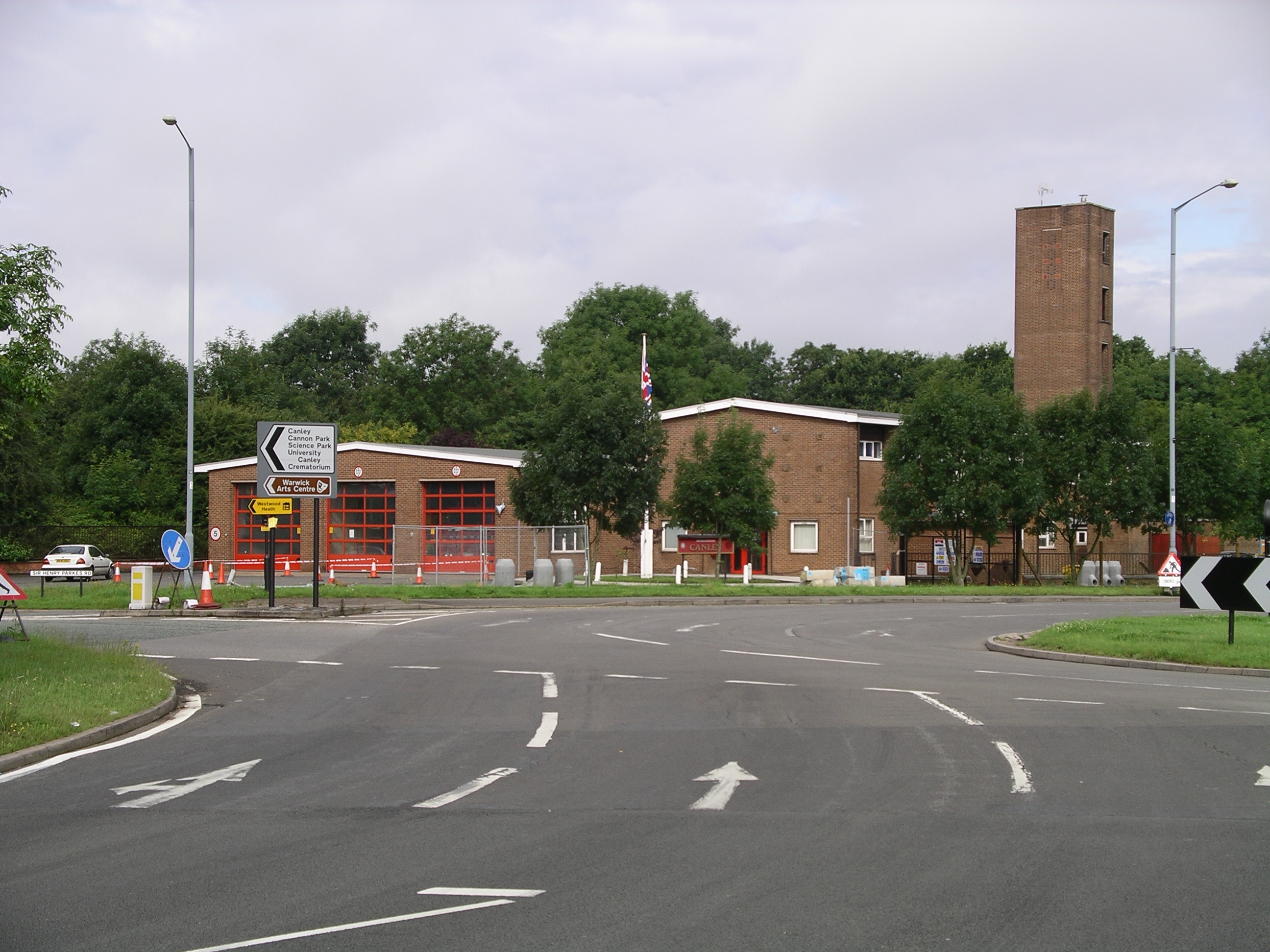
Canley Fire Station

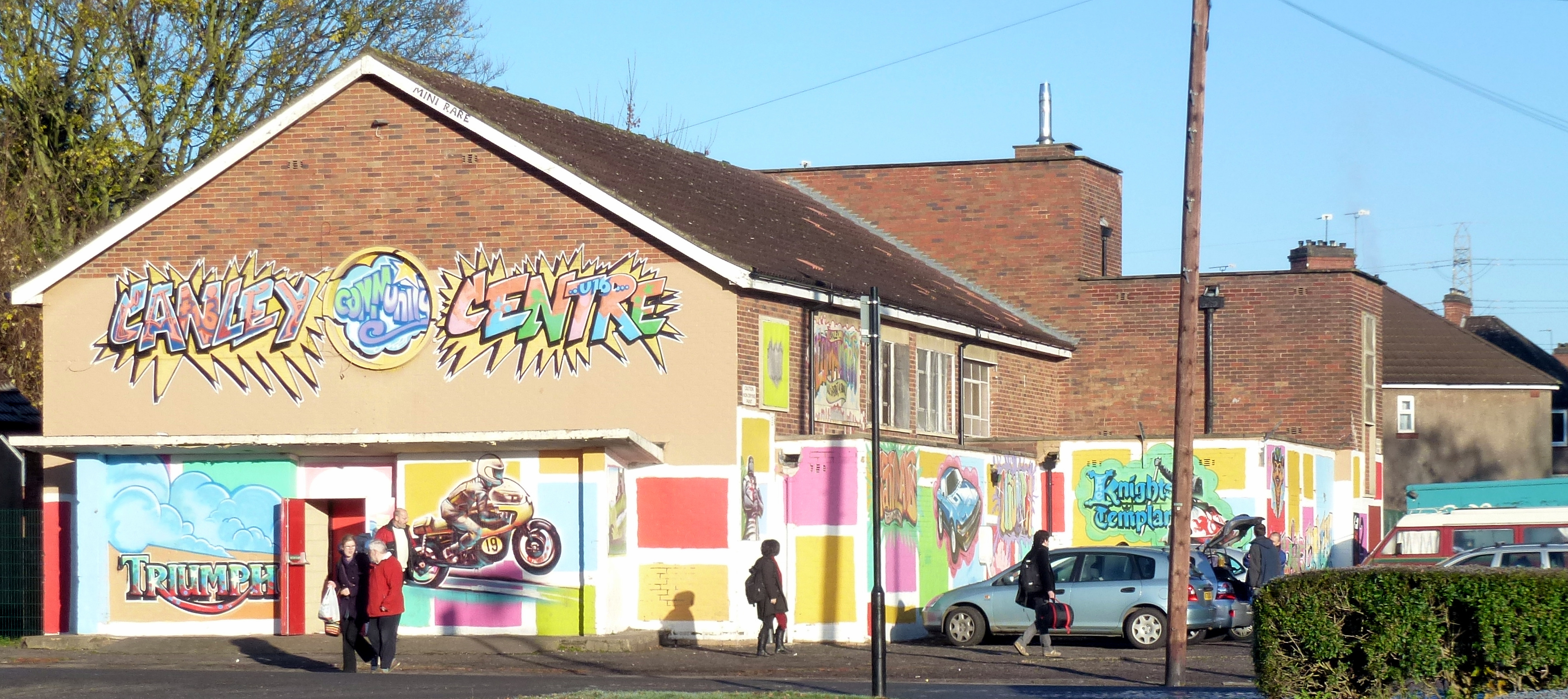
Canley Community Centre

Canley is a suburban neighbourhood located in south-west Coventry, England. Canley became part of Coventry as a result of successive encroachment of the latter's boundaries between 1928 and 1932, having historically been part of the Stoneleigh parish. Electorally, it is largely in Westwood ward and partially within the Wainbody and Earlsdon wards.

The area is home to many students attending the nearby University of Warwick.

There was a level crossing adjacent to Canley railway station until 2003, when the road was closed and a footbridge was built over the railway.

The suburb is bisected by the A45 dual-carriageway, with a major state housing development (built in the early-1950s) lying to the south and an area of private housing (Canley Gardens) situated north of this road towards Canley rail station. Adjacent districts include Cannon Park and Cannon Hill to the east, Tile Hill South to the north and Westwood Heath to south.

== History ==
Canley is known as the site of the main factory of the Standard Motor Company and was all open farmland before 1916. The initial factory was built around 'Ivy Cottage', near the Canley Train Halt and was first used in 1916 to build First World War fighter aircraft. 'Standard' cars were produced there from 1918 onwards. The factory continued to expand over the site throughout the 1920s and most significantly just before the Second World War when two additional Shadow Factories were added. Production of Standard and Triumph cars continued until car production ceased in August 1980 as part of British Leyland's rationalisation, although the Triumph brand survived until 1984 with the last Triumph badged car being built at the Cowley plant near Oxford.

Some of the Triumph car factory site was retained as a technical centre until the mid-1990s but was successively demolished thereafter. A commemorative sculpture of the Standard-Triumph badge now stands on the site of the works, on Herald Avenue, close to the Standard Triumph Club, which is now the only remaining building of the industrial complex where thousands of Coventry people once worked.

Sir Henry Parkes (1815–1896), Australian statesman and five times Premier of New South Wales, was born in Canley, in a cottage off Moat House Lane. Canley Fire Station is located in Sir Henry Parkes Road near to the A45. A school named after him in Canley was demolished in 2006.

== Schools ==
- The Westwood School, a comprehensive secondary school
- Charter Academy, Castle Phoenix Trust (formed from merging Sir Henry Park School and Alderman Harris School)
- WMG Academy for Young Engineers, Coventry

== Local landmarks ==
Some of the notable landmarks in the Canley area include:

- The Phantom Coach public house
- The Sovereign public house
- Cannon Park Shopping Centre
- Canley Fire Station
- Canley Community Centre
- Canley Library
- Canley Evangelical Church
- St Stephens Church
- Xcel Leisure Centre
- Coventry Technical Rugby Club
- Canley Railway Station
- Canley Social Club (now demolished)
- Charter Avenue Industrial Estate

The University of Warwick is situated directly to the south of Canley.

== See also ==
- Austin Rover Group
- Triumph Motorcycles
- Canley railway station
