= Marcia nuziale =

- Directed by: Marco Ferreri
- Written by: Rafael Azcona (writer); Diego Fabbri (writer)
- Music by: Teo Usuelli
- Release date: 1965
- Running time: 100 minutes
- Country: Italy
- Language: Italian

Marcia nuziale is a 1965 Italian film directed by Marco Ferreri.

== Cast ==
- Ugo Tognazzi
- Shirley Anne Field
- Alexandra Stewart
- Gaia Germani
- Catherine Faillot
- Tecla Scarano
- Gianni Bonagura
- Julia Drago
- Tom Felleghy
