= Feng Shou =

Type of martial art style

Feng Shou (風手) is a 20th-century Martial Arts style as taught by Chee Soo, a Barnardo's orphan and soldier originally named Clifford Soo, who grew up in London. According to Chee Soo, Feng Shou originated in the 1930s when Chan Kam Lee, an importer and exporter of precious stones, taught a class in Red Lion Square in Holborn, though there are no verified records of the existence of Lee, or the martial arts class. According to Chee Soo, Chan Kam Lee met Chee Soo and taught him the style regularly from 1934, though by 1937, Chee Soo was recorded as enlisted full-time in the British Army. It is an internal or soft style, though the style has not been historically practiced in China, and may originate from a mix of Japanese styles that Soo learned in London after the end of World War 2, according to an article from Chee Soo's daughter, Lavinia.

Feng Shou Ch’uan Shu can be translated as 'Hand of the wind boxing'. The name originates from the ‘Earl of the Wind’, who in Chinese mythology was called Feng Po.

== Feng Shou techniques ==
Feng Shou is a soft or internal style so the techniques are relaxed and generally involved circular motion with no blocking. In his training manual of Feng Shou Chee Soo details several areas of technique such as for example:

=== Partner exercises ===
- Foot flow patterns which teach students fluidity of movement on the feet.
- Rollaways which is a repeated pattern of striking and warding off blows targeted at different parts of the body. Rollaways can also be practised with weapons such as staff and sabre.
- Evasion exercises such as Teacup, Clockface and Four lotus petals. Strikes and kicks are avoided with stepping patterns in various directions orientated to the compass points.
- Arm locks and wrist locks similar to Chin Na.
- Grip and breakout - taking turns to escape from different holds using soft techniques.
- Sticky hands a free style exercise to develop sensitivity similar to Taiji Pushing Hands.
- Qishu or throwing similar to Aikido and incorporating Chinese wrestling or Shuai jiao.

=== Forms ===
- Chee Soo Shou Bei Fa - literally Chee Soo hand and arm technique, a series of defences against typical attacks.
- Tu Shou or poisoned hands - slow defences and rapid striking patterns with usually three strikes to vital areas of the body.
- Active Mist - similar to Tu Shou but with slow attacks and fast defence.
- Weapons forms with staff or Gun, and sabre or Dao.

== History ==
- 1930 Chan Kam Lee emigrated to Britain from Weihaiwei a British colony in Shandong China and established his Taoist Arts club in Holborn, London.
- In 1934 Chee Soo met Chan Kam Lee and started his training in the Taoist Arts including Feng Shou kung fu.
- In 1950 Chee Soo established his first club in Manor road school West Ham.
- Chee Soo was awarded a Guinness World Record for showing Feng Shou kung fu on television as part of the classic cult TV show The Avengers which was shown in eighty countries worldwide: "In 1965, Dame Diana Rigg (UK) became the first western actress to perform kung fu on Television when the combat choreographers Ray Austin (UK) and Chee Soo (UK/China) worked elements of the martial art into her fight scenes on The Avengers. Certificate presentation was done on The New Paul O'Grady Show."
- According to a British Movietone News documentary filmed on 21 May 1970 at Guildford in Surrey - UK, Chee Soo had over 2000 students studying Wu Shu in Britain as part of the British Wu Shu Association. He was only one of three men outside of Beijing qualified to teach Wu Shu.
- Chee Soo appeared in a BBC Nationwide TV interview on 21 September 1973 where he demonstrated Feng Shou kung fu self-defence techniques and inner power live in the studio with presenter Bob Wellings.
- In 1974 Chee Soo published his first book A Step by Step guide to Kung Fu.
- Chee Soo and one of his London Feng Shou kung fu clubs were featured in a 1975 BBC Television documentary about the kung fu boom of the early 1970s and its effects on teenagers contrasting traditional western boxing with hard and soft styles of kung fu.
- In 1983 Chee Soo wrote The Taoist Art of Feng Shou, published by HarperCollins, a definitive training manual with various details about the style.
- From 1982 Chee Soo moved to Coventry and taught regular evening classes in Feng Shou Kung Fu at the Alderman Callow School in Canley where he also taught weekend classes for students and instructors of Feng Shou from around Britain and also from classes in France and Germany and the Netherlands. He also taught a week-long course during the summer.
- In 1990 Chee Soo moved to Ebbw Vale in South Wales where he continued teaching Feng Shou kung fu as well as visiting his students around the UK.
- Since the death of Chee Soo in August 1994 there are now several schools teaching Feng Shou kung fu based in the British Isles with clubs in France, Germany, The Netherlands, Australia and New Zealand, each of which emphasize different aspects of the Lee style Feng Shou kung fu.
