= House of the Living Dead =

1974 British film by Ray Austin

- Directed by: Ray Austin
- Written by: Marc Marais
- Produced by: Matt Drucker; Phillip N. Krasne; Basil Rabin
- Starring: Mark Burns; Shirley Anne Field; David Oxley; Margaret Inglis
- Cinematography: Lionel Friedberg (lighting cameraman)
- Edited by: Diana Friedberg (as Diana Ginsberg)
- Music by: Peter J. Elliott (as Peter Elliot)
- Production company: Associated Film Productions
- Release date: 1974
- Running time: 86 minutes
- Countries: Great Britain; South Africa
- Language: English

House of the Living Dead (Skaduwees Oor Brugplaas, or Shadows over Bridge Farm), also known as Doctor Maniac, is a 1974 science-fiction horror film directed by Ray Austin and starring Mark Burns, Shirley Anne Field and David Oxley. The film, an international co-production between Great Britain and South Africa, takes place on a plantation in South Africa and deals heavily with the occult.

== Plot ==
The storyline follows a white family running a plantation farm on the Cape Colony in South Africa. The family consists of a mother and her two sons, Michael and Breck. Michael runs the house while Breck spends his time alone in his room, deformed and insane, conducting experiments to try to prove the soul is an organic object able to live outside the human body. Michael's fiancée Mary arrives to marry him, much to the mother's dismay as she wants the family to end so the long history of madness can stop. Meanwhile, strange things begin to happen at the plantation, such as voodoo, which is assumed to be the work of the local black neighbors, and murder.

== Cast ==
- Mark Burns as Sir Michael Brattling / Dr. Breckinridge Brattling
- Shirley Anne Field as Mary Anne Carew
- David Oxley as Dr. Collinson
- Margaret Inglis as Lady Brattling
- Dia Sydow as Lina
- Lynn Maree as Annie
- Bill Flynn as Simeon
- William Baird Clark as Capt. Turner
- Ronald France as Col. Pringle
- Don Furnival as Brand
- Pieter Geldenhuys as Shoemaker
- Ben Dekker as Jan
- Limpie Basson as Hugo de Groot
- Amina Gool as Aia Kat

== Content ==
The film contains very little gore and no zombies at all, as would generally be expected of a title containing "Living Dead". It is sometimes confused with the substantially more popular video game series House of the Dead.

== Release ==
The film is 86 minutes long (85 in the UK cut version) and is rated Australia: R (and UK PG). It goes under various names – Doctor Maniac in the UK and US, Curse of the Dead also in the US, and Kill, Baby, Kill when released to video.

== Reception ==
The Monthly Film Bulletin wrote: "First, there is the laboratory with its flasks, coloured fluids, and pop-eyed scientist indicating Doctor Maniac's probable descent from Baron Frankenstein; another set of references, such as the decaying manor, the hereditary madness of the Bratling heirs, and the hints of incest suggest that this is really a House of Usher, or at any rate, closer to Poe than to Ms. Shelley. When the atmosphere subsequently switches to one of drums in the night, voodoo and black magic, I Walked with a Zombie immediately springs to mind. That screenwriter De V Marais and director Austin were conscious of their film's innumerable allusions and derivations seems unlikely given the vastly inefficient manner in which they have assembled this stale Gothic smorgasbord. However, with the aid of some execrable performances, the film does rise to a very amusing climax with Collins, the middle-aged hero, racing to the rescue on a white steed while Breck rambles on about 'soular' intercourse and how he doesn't enjoy being called a loony."

== Awards ==
Mark Burns was recognized as Best Actor at the 1974 Sitges Film Festival.

== See also ==
- Night of the Living Dead
