= Hell Is Empty =

1967 British film by John Ainsworth and Bernard Knowles

- Directed by: John Ainsworth; Bernard Knowles
- Screenplay by: John Ainsworth
- Based on: a screenplay by Bernard Knowles & George Fowler; and the novel Hell Is Empty by J.F. Straker (1958)
- Produced by: Michael Eland
- Starring: Anthony Steel; Shirley Anne Field; James Robertson Justice; Jess Conrad; Martine Carol
- Cinematography: Sasa Hunka; Jan Stallich
- Edited by: Jim Connock
- Music by: Georges Garvarentz
- Production company: Dominion Films
- Distributed by: Rank Film Distributors (UK)
- Release date: December 1967
- Running time: 109 minutes
- Country: United Kingdom
- Language: English

Hell is Empty is a 1967 British crime film directed by Bernard Knowles and John Ainsworth, and starring Martine Carol, Anthony Steel, Shirley Anne Field and James Robertson Justice. It was written by Ainsworth from a screenplay by Knowles and George Fowler, based on the 1958 novel of the same title by J.F. Straker.

== Premise ==
On the run from the police, thieves stumble upon an abandoned mansion on a deserted island.

== Cast ==
- Martine Carol as Martine Grant
- Anthony Steel as Major Morton
- James Robertson Justice as Angus McGee
- Shirley Anne Field as Shirley McGee
- Isa Miranda as Isa Grant
- Carl Möhner as Carl Schultz
- Robert Rietti as Robert Grant
- Jess Conrad as Jess Shepherd
- Anthony Dawson as Paul Grant
- Catherine Schell as Catherine Grant (as Catherine von Schell)
- Irene von Meyendorff as Helen McGee
- Patricia Viterbo as Patricia
- Anna Gaël as Anna
- Eugene Deckers as counsel
- Sheila Burrell as judge

== Production ==
The film was made by Absorbing Films, which had been set up by Michael Eaton-Eland, a prominent London figure, who wanted to move into filmmaking. Filming started in December 1965 on the isle of Capri. It was Martine Carol's first movie in three years and one of a number of films Steel made in Europe.

Filmink called the movie "one of several thrillers made by Rank that were co-productions partly shot in Europe using international 'names'."

The film was shot in Italy and Yugoslavia. However several of the actors and technicians claimed they had not been paid. Filming came to a halt. Carol married Eaton-Eland in June 1966, at which stage the film had not been completed.

Carol died of a heart attack in February 1967. Production resumed under director John Ainsworth.

== Reception ==
The Monthly Film Bulletin wrote: "The nonsensical story, which ten years ago might at least have had an overtone of reality within a small budget black-and-white framework, has here exploded into sumptuous colour, extravagant locations and a gimcrack way with camera zooms. But beneath the reconditioned exterior, the old-fashioned gears set up an awful grinding: the crooks are a coarse lot, their robbery is by modern standards very rudimentary, and their hostages make a determined English parlour setting out of their indeterminate foreign locale. James Robertson Justice's Shakespearian authority is as tedious as his usual blustery impersonations; but no one could be expected to perform any miracles with the dilapidated dialogue, and no one does."
