= Daniel McDonald (actor) =

American actor (1960–2007)

- Born: July 30, 1960; Scranton, Pennsylvania, U.S.
- Died: February 15, 2007 (aged 46); New York City, U.S.
- Spouse: Mujah Maraini-Melehi (m. 1999)
- Children: 2
- Relatives: Christopher McDonald (brother)

Daniel McDonald (July 30, 1960 – February 15, 2007) was an American actor who guest-starred in many TV shows such as CSI: Miami, Law & Order, Murder, She Wrote and Sex and the City. He was also involved in Broadway, performing in Mamma Mia!

== Personal life ==
McDonald was born the youngest of seven children in Scranton, Pennsylvania, and raised in Romulus, New York. He graduated from Ithaca College.

McDonald's older brother, Christopher McDonald, is also an actor who is seen in many films and television shows.

He met Mujah Maraini-Melehi during the rehearsals for Steel Pier. The couple were married in 1999 and had two children.

== Career ==
He was a life member of the Actors Studio. He also studied at the Royal Academy of Dramatic Art in London, with Paul Curtis of the American Mime Theatre, and with Sanford Meisner on the island of Bequia in the British West Indies where he met long-time friend and photographer Michael Sanville.

McDonald received a 1997 Tony Award nomination for his lead role in Steel Pier, which co-starred Karen Ziemba and Gregory Harrison.

In 2002, Daniel McDonald replaced Alan Campbell as lead in the national tour of Contact.

The Gift: Life Unwrapped, McDonald's last film, was released posthumously in May 2007.

He recorded an album True Love.

== Death ==
Steel Pier director Scott Ellis said in a Feb. 16 [2007] statement, "What made Daniel so special as a performer was what made him so special as a person. He had an incredible openness, honesty, integrity that made him remarkable both onstage and off."

McDonald died on February 15, 2007, at his home in New York, aged 46. The cause was brain cancer, said Jason Brantley, a spokesman for Mr. McDonald's family. Funeral services were held February 24, 2007, at the Cathedral Church of Saint John the Divine in New York City.

== Filmography ==
=== Movies ===
| Year | Title | Role | Notes |
|---|---|---|---|
| 1984 | Where the Boys Are '84 | Camden Roxbury | |
| 1985 | The Falcon and the Snowman | Clay | Credited as Dan McDonald |
| 1987 | Million Dollar Mystery | Crush | |
| 1993 | Blood In Blood Out | Gallery Assistant | |
| 1993 | What's Love Got to Do with It | London Announcer | |
| 1994 | At Risk | Steven | |
| 1995 | Let It Be Me | Fred | |
| 1997 | The Ice Storm | Weatherman | |
| 1998 | Jaded | Bart | |
| 2007 | The Gift: Life Unwrapped | Stephen | Archive Footage |

=== Television ===
| Year | Title | Role | Notes |
|---|---|---|---|
| 1985 | The Fall Guy | Brian Carlin | 1 Episode: Her Bodyguard |
| 1985 | Call to Glory | Nick Oliver | 2 episodes: JFK: Part 1 & 2 |
| 1985 | Shadow Chasers | Hall | 1 Episode: Spirit of St. Louis |
| 1985–88 | Cagney & Lacey | Frank Myerling | 2 episodes: Lost and Found, Yup |
| 1986 | Thompson's Last Run | Casino | TV movie |
| 1986 | A Year in the Life | Eric Castle | 2 episodes: Springtime/Autumn, Christmas '86 |
| 1987 | The Betty Ford Story | Mike Ford | TV movie |
| 1987 | Mr. President | Fred | 1 Episode: Pilot |
| 1987 | Home Fires | | TV movie |
| 1988 | Freddy's Nightmares | Mark | 1 Episode: Freddy's Tricks and Treats |
| 1989 | Murder, She Wrote | Bobby Shipton | 2 episodes: Mirror, Mirror, on the Wall: Part 1 & 2 |
| 1990 | The Baby-Sitters Club | Photographer | 1 Episode: Stacey's Big Break |
| 1992 | Columbo | Strassa | 1 Episode: No Time to Die |
| 1994 | Herman's Head | Roy | 1 Episode: Sweet Obsessions |
| 1995 | As Good as Dead | Thomas A. Rutherford | TV movie |
| 1995 | New York News | | 1 Episode: Cost of Living |
| 1995 | New York Undercover | Milton Allen | 1 Episode: Color Lines |
| 1996 | All My Children | Dr. Brad Phillips | 2 episodes: #1.6768, #1.6969 |
| 1998 | Law & Order | Bernard Dressler | 1 Episode: Under the Influence |
| 1999 | Sex and the City | Roger Cobb | 1 Episode: Shortcomings |
| 2000 | D.C. | Dryder | 3 episodes: Blame, Party, Guns and Roses |
| 2000 | Dov'è mio figlio | McCarthy | TV movie |
| 2000 | Madigan Men | Serge | 1 Episode: Love's Labor Lost |
| 2001 | Law & Order: Special Victims Unit | Dr. Byron Marks | 1 Episode: Secrets |
| 2004 | CSI: Miami | Gary Nielson | 1 Episode: The Oath |
| 2004 | Tempting Adam | Miles | TV movie |
