= WMG Academy for Young Engineers, Coventry =

WMG Academy for Young Engineers Trust, Coventry

Location
- Mitchell Avenue; Coventry, West Midlands, CV4 8DY; England; 52.3890°N 1.5713°W

Information
- Type: University technical college
- Established: 1 September 2014
- Founder: Professor Lord Kumar Bhattacharyya
- Local authority: Coventry
- Department for Education URN: 140961 Tables
- Ofsted: Reports
- Chair: John Leighfield CBE
- Executive Principal: Stewart Tait
- Gender: Coeducational
- Age: 14 to 19
- Website: coventry.wmgacademy.org.uk

WMG Academy for Young Engineers is a University Technical College in the Canley area of Coventry, England. The college opened in 2014 on a site adjacent to The Westwood Academy.

== Trust ==
The WMG Academy trust has two academies: the first opened in Coventry in September 2014, and the second at Solihull in September 2016. The trust's board is chaired by Chief Engineer at JLR, James Morgan, and the executive leadership consists of Stewart Tait (CEO), Adele Wallis (Associate Principal Coventry), Dan Thomson (Assistant Principal Coventry), Claire Morris (Associate Principal Solihull) and Sian O'Malley (Assistant Principal Solihull)

== Sponsors ==
The UTC's sponsors include WMG, University of Warwick, and the major local employer Jaguar Land Rover, together with local firms such as OLEO Savery and Automotive Insulations, and national companies including Bosch and National Grid.

== Academics ==
UTCs take students at the age of 14 (Key Stage 4) and 16 (Key Stage 5). The academy focuses on technical education. In Key Stage 4, the curriculum focuses on STEM subjects. Before being admitted students attend a guidance interview to discuss their career path and the most appropriate programme of study.

== See also ==
- The Westwood Academy
- WMG Academy for Young Engineers, Solihull
