= Shirley Anne Field =

English actress (1936–2023)

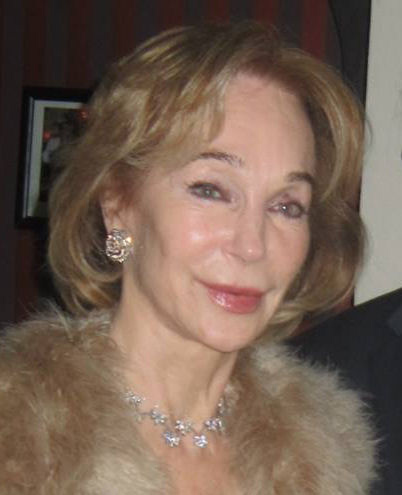
- Field in 2014
- Born: Shirley Broomfield; 27 June 1936; Forest Gate, Essex, England
- Died: 10 December 2023 (aged 87)
- Occupation: Actress
- Years active: 1955–2023
- Spouse: Charles Crichton-Stuart (m. 1967; div. 1975)
- Children: 1

Shirley Anne Field (born Shirley Broomfield; 27 June 1936 – 10 December 2023) was an English actress who performed on stage, film and television from 1955 until her death. She was prominent during the British New Wave.

== Early life ==
Shirley Broomfield was born in Forest Gate, Essex (in the London Borough of Newham) on 27 June 1936. She was the third of four children, with two elder sisters and a younger brother, Earnest "Guy" Broomfield (c. 1939–1999).

At the age of six, Shirley was placed in the National Children's Home at Edgworth, near Bolton, Lancashire, and four years later was moved to another children's home in Blackburn, where she attended Blakey Moor School for Girls. She subsequently returned to Edgworth until she was 15, when she moved to a children's home hostel in London, training as a typist while still attending school.

== Acting career ==
=== Early roles ===
After a course at the Lucie Clayton School and Model Agency, Field became a photographic model for pin-up magazines like Reveille and Titbits. She was subsequently spotted by Bill Watts, who ran a theatrical agency and obtained for her roles in late 1950s British films, usually uncredited.

Field first appearance in a film was as an extra in Simon and Laura (1955). She had small parts in All for Mary (1955), Lost (1956), Yield to the Night (1956) (directed by J. Lee Thompson), It's Never Too Late (1956), It's a Wonderful World (1956), The Weapon (1956), Loser Takes All (1956), The Silken Affair (1956), Dry Rot (1956), The Good Companions (1957) (again for Thompson), Seven Thunders (1957), and The Flesh Is Weak (1957). She was in episodes of The New Adventures of Martin Kane (1957) and International Detective.

Field's first sizeable film role was in Horrors of the Black Museum (1959). She had minor parts in Once More, with Feeling! (1960) and And the Same to You (1960). Field had a larger role in the controversial Peeping Tom (1960). She appeared on stage in The Lily White Boys with Albert Finney.

=== Stardom ===
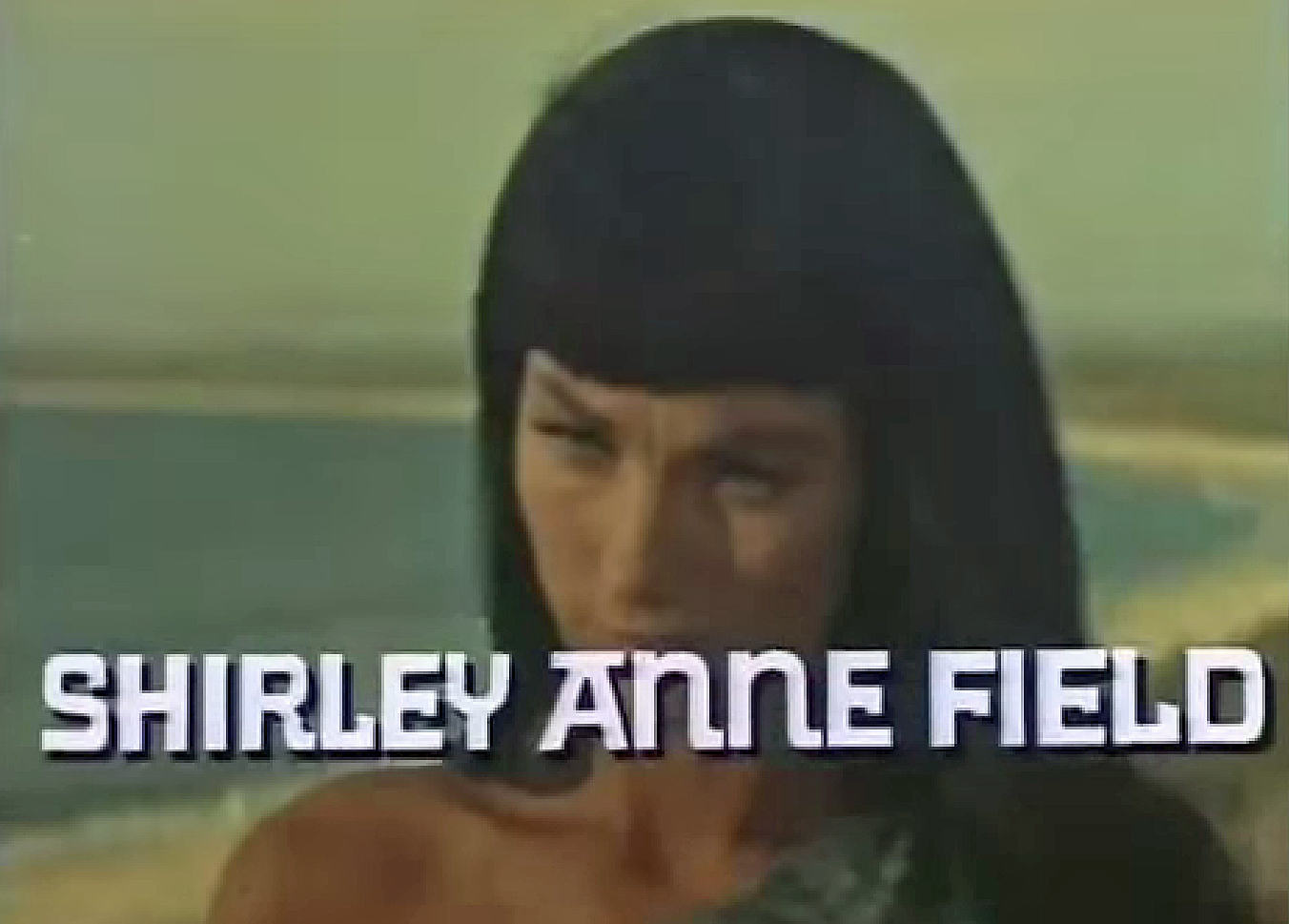
Field (age 27) in trailer for Kings of the Sun (1963).

In 1960, Field's breakthrough came when she was chosen by Tony Richardson to play the role of model Tina Lapford in The Entertainer (1960), starring Laurence Olivier, distributed by Bryanston Films. Half a century later, she clarified that she did not owe her break to Olivier: "It was Tony Richardson I owe it all to."

Field had a supporting role in Beat Girl (1960), then appeared in probably her best known role as Doreen, the would-be girlfriend of rebellious Arthur Seaton (played by Albert Finney), in the New Wave film for Bryanston, Saturday Night and Sunday Morning (1960). Director Karel Reisz described her as "difficult to play with". Co-star Finney had previously had a small role in The Entertainer. The film was a huge hit.

Field starred alongside Kenneth More in Man in the Moon (1960). With those three big film starring roles in 1960, she became one of the very few actors ever to have their name above the titles in all the major cinemas around Leicester Square simultaneously.

Although offered a role in A Kind of Loving (1962), Field turned it down to play the female lead in a Hollywood financed film, The War Lover (1962), with Steve McQueen. Four decades later she admitted that the shoot was not ideal:

It was the stuff dreams are made of, but I didn't get to enjoy it like I should have. When I arrived I was so panicked and tired and the sun was just too yellow and the orange juice too orange. It was very stressful and I had a headache all the time. I just wasn't used to it. I didn't have anyone to look after me.

In the UK Field had the lead in Lunch Hour (1962), which was one of her favourite films.

For Hammer films, Field starred in The Damned (1963), directed by Joseph Losey. She went to Hollywood to play the female lead in an epic directed by J. Lee Thompson, Kings of the Sun (1963). Thompson had her under personal contract at this stage. She says she turned down roles in a James Bond movie and an Elvis Presley movie.

Field went to Italy to appear in The Wedding March (1966), then back in England made Doctor in Clover (1966) and Alfie (1966). She had a supporting role in Hell Is Empty (1967).

== Later career ==
Field starred in With Love in Mind (1970) and A Touch of the Other (1970), then made House of the Living Dead (1974).

By the late 1970s Field was more commonly seen on TV, in shows such as Centre Play, Shoestring, Buccaneer, Never the Twain and a long run on Santa Barbara as well as TV movies like Two by Forsyth. She had roles in films, inter alia, My Beautiful Laundrette (1985), Shag (1989), Getting It Right (1989), The Rachel Papers (1989), Hear My Song (1991), U.F.O. (1993), Taking Liberty (1993), Loving Deadly (1994), and At Risk (1994).

Her later television roles included Anna Lee: Headcase (1993), Murder She Wrote, Lady Chatterly, Rumble, Bramwell, Barbara, Madson, Dalziel and Pascoe, The Bill, Where the Heart Is, Waking the Dead, Monarch of the Glen, Last of the Summer Wine, Doctors. Her most recent films are The Kid, The Power of Three and Beautiful Relics.

== Personal life and death ==
On 7 July 1967, Field married the aristocratic RAF pilot and racing driver Charles Crichton-Stuart (1939–2001). They had a daughter, Nicola Crichton-Stuart, who was born in 1969. The marriage ended in divorce in 1975. Her autobiography, A Time for Love, was published in 1991.

On 14 November 1993, Field appeared on BBC Radio 4's Desert Island Discs, talking to Sue Lawley about her upbringing in different children's homes in Northern England and her success as an actress in the 1960s. She also reminisced about her friendship with John F. Kennedy and an ill-fated date with Frank Sinatra. Her record choices included Beethoven's Piano Concerto No. 1 in C major and pieces by Rachmaninov, Elvis Presley and the Carpenters.

In September 1999 Field's brother Guy was killed in his San Francisco home, by his girlfriend's son Harry Dalsey, the son of DHL founder Adrian Dalsey. Field flew to the US to begin a civil action alleging wrongful death.

In the September 2009 issue of Cinema Retro, there was a long interview with Field, where she candidly talked about her childhood and the making of Peeping Tom, The Entertainer, Beat Girl and The War Lover.

Field died on 10 December 2023, at the age of 87.

== Filmography ==
=== Film ===
Years	Title	Role	Notes
1955	Simon and Laura	Extra	uncredited
1955	All for Mary	Young Woman on Aeroplane	uncredited
1955	Lost	Miss Carter	uncredited
1956	Yield to the Night	Extra	uncredited
1956	It's Never Too Late	Extra	uncredited
1956	It's a Wonderful World	Pretty Girl	
1956	The Weapon	Girl in Nightclub	uncredited
1956	Loser Takes All	Girl at Roulette Table	uncredited
1956	The Silken Affair	Young Lady	uncredited
1956	Dry Rot	Waitress in Cafe	uncredited
1957	The Good Companions	Redhead	
1957	The Flesh Is Weak	Susan	
1957	Seven Thunders	Prostitute	uncredited
1959	Horrors of the Black Museum	Angela Banks	
1959	Upstairs and Downstairs	Passenger	uncredited
1960	Once More, with Feeling!	Angela Hopper	
1960	And the Same to You	Iris Collins	
1960	Peeping Tom	Pauline Shields	
1960	The Entertainer	Tina Lapford	
1960	Beat Girl	Dodo	
1960	Saturday Night and Sunday Morning	Doreen	
1960	Man in the Moon	Polly	
1960	Jungle Street	Jaqui	
1962	The War Lover	Daphne	
1962	The Damned	Joan	
1963	Kings of the Sun	Ixchel	
1963	Lunch Hour	Girl	
1965	The Wedding March	Laure	
1966	Doctor in Clover	Nurse Bancroft	
1966	Alfie	Carla	
1967	Hell Is Empty	Shirley McGee	
1970	With Love in Mind	Jane	
1970	A Touch of the Other	Elaine	
1974	House of the Living Dead	Mary Anne Carew	
1985	My Beautiful Laundrette	Rachel	
1988	Shag	Mrs. Clatterback	
1989	Getting It Right	Anne	
1989	The Rachel Papers	Mrs. Smith	
1991	Hear My Song	Cathleen Doyle	
1993	U.F.O.	Supreme Commander	
1994	Loving Deadly	Madame	
1994	At Risk	Mrs. Nolan	
1999	A Monkey's Tale	The Governess	Voice
2000	Christie Malry's Own Double-Entry	Mary	
2010	The Kid	Margaret	
2011	The Power of Three	Jenni	

=== Television roles ===
Years	Title	Role	Notes
1957	The New Adventures of Martin Kane	Miss Craig	Episode: "The Escape Story"
1959	International Detective	The Girl	Episode: "The Conway Case"
1966	Five More	Madeleine	Episode: "Shotgun"
1977	Centre Play	Joanne Clewes	Episode: "Risking It"
1979	Shoestring	Barbara Knight	Episode: "Knock for Knock"
1980	Buccaneer	Janet Blair	11 episodes
1987	Never the Twain	Stephanie	Episode: "Affairs of the Heart"
1987	Santa Barbara	Pamela Capwell Conrad	42 episodes
1992	El C.I.D.	Dolly	Episode: "Nothing Is Forever"
1992	Murder, She Wrote	Anne Gillen	Episode: "The Wind Around the Tower"
1993	Anna Lee: Headcase	Mrs. Westerman	TV film
1993	Lady Chatterley	Mrs. Bolton	All 4 episodes
1995	Rumble	Vatwoman	Episode: #1.2
1995	Bramwell	Peggy Heart	Episode: "The Threat of Reprise"
1995	Barbara	Jean	Episode: "Job"
1996	Madson	Elaine Dews	4 episodes
1999	Dalziel and Pascoe	Cissy Kohler	Episode: "Recalled to Life"
2000	The Bill	Janice Laughlin	Episode: "Crime and Punishment"
2001	Where the Heart Is	Linda	5 episodes
2003	Waking the Dead	Monica Reynolds	2 episodes
2005	Monarch of the Glen	Sadie	Episode: #7.6
2008	Last of the Summer Wine	Eva	Episode: "Eva's Back in Town"
2010	Doctors	Flora Reid	Episode: "Swansong"

== Bibliography ==
- Field, Shirley Anne (1991). A Time for Love: An Autobiography. Bantam. ISBN 978-0-593-01161-4.
- Halliwell, Leslie (1981). Halliwell's Who's Who in the Movies. Harper-Collins. ISBN 0-06-093507-3.
- Katz, Ephraim (2005). The Film Encyclopedia. Collins. ISBN 0-06-074214-3.
