= The National B2B Centre =

The National B2B Centre is a Limited company which focusses on supporting small and medium-sized businesses located in the West Midlands region of Britain. The centre was based in the International Digital Lab at the University of Warwick

== Events ==
The B2B Centre runs regular events and workshops for small and medium businesses within the West Midlands region to help them understand and to apply low cost tools and techniques to their business processes.

== Regional Partnerships ==
The company was originally funded by Advantage West Midlands, the European Regional Development Fund and supported by the Warwick Manufacturing Group (WMG) at the University of Warwick.

The National B2B Centre supports the Business IT Guide for the West Midlands, writes regular e-business articles for BusinessZone and sponsors The Manufacturing Excellence Award for Integrated e-Business.
