= Chan Kam Lee =

Practitioners of Lee-style tai chi believe Chan Kam Lee was a Taoist teacher who brought Taoist Arts to the West. According to Chee Soo, Chan Kam Lee established a Taoist Arts school in Red Lion Square in Holborn in 1930 teaching Lee-style tai chi, Qigong, Traditional Chinese Medicine and Feng Shou 'Hand of the Wind' kung fu, and used his knowledge of Chinese Medicine and Herbalism to adapt the Ch'ang Ming diet for Westerners. Chan Kam Lee is referenced in several books written by Chee Soo and published by HarperCollins, but there is no corroboration of his existence independent of Chee Soo's accounts.

== Taoist Arts club in London 1930 ==
- Chee Soo talked about his first meeting with his teacher in a radio interview with Brian Hayes on LBC in 1977:

No he was sitting there, just sitting there very quietly, and I went over to retrieve my ball, and I came up to the front of him to apologise, and I saw he was Chinese, and we got talking and he was an importer/exporter, very much alone he had no family, and I was of course actually an orphan and having no family of my own, and the friendship gradually grew and grew, and till eventually in actual fact after many meetings he invited me to his club in Holborn, Red Lion Square, which he had a little club meeting three or four times a week, and from then on I practised under him almost continuously.

- Lavinia Soo-Warr wrote about Chan Lee in an article in Combat magazine saying that he was a teacher of Taoist Arts from Weihai in Shandong province and derived from a religious or possibly political group called the "Sons of Reflected Light"." Lavinia says the Arts included martial arts and healing techniques including Daoyin breathing exercises which were not passed on openly during the time of the political upheavals of the Cultural Revolution in China 1966 - 1976 when Taoist practices like tai chi were banned.

== Business ==
Chan Kam Lee is said to have been the last in line of the Lee family from Weihaiwei in northern China, and as he was an importer and exporter of precious and semi-precious stones, he travelled thousands of miles promoting his business, which was mainly between Hong Kong, Japan, Singapore and England. After he had built up a stable business he finally set up his main office in London, and from there he did most of his trade.

== Arts ==
Chee Soo says that, after a while, Chan Kam Lee began to get restless, and he sought an outlet for his physical, mental and spiritual needs. As a result, he established a small and select class in a schoolroom in Red Lion Square, near Holborn, in Central London, teaching and practising his Chinese Taoist arts. He catered only for his own personal friends and their sons, so the total number of his students was very small, and at the most there were only a dozen people attending. All of them were in business and travelled quite a lot, so the average attendance at any one time was only in the region of six people. However, this did not deter Chan Lee for he was able to keep up his own practice as well, which was the main objective in the first place, so he was very happy.

== Death and legacy ==
According to Chee Soo's account: "In the winter of 1953-4, Chan Lee died, off the coast of China, near Canton, when the ship he was travelling in sank in a severe storm," Chan Lee's student went on to teach the Taoist Arts and during the cultural revolution his group was the largest group teaching Taoist Arts in the world. After the death of Chee Soo in 1994 several groups have continued to teach the Taoist Arts of the Lee family style in Britain, France, Germany, the Netherlands, and in other countries around the world.
