= Kumar Bhattacharyya, Baron Bhattacharyya =

British-Indian engineer and advisor (1940–2019)

The Right Honourable The Lord Bhattacharyya CBE FRS FREng FIMechE
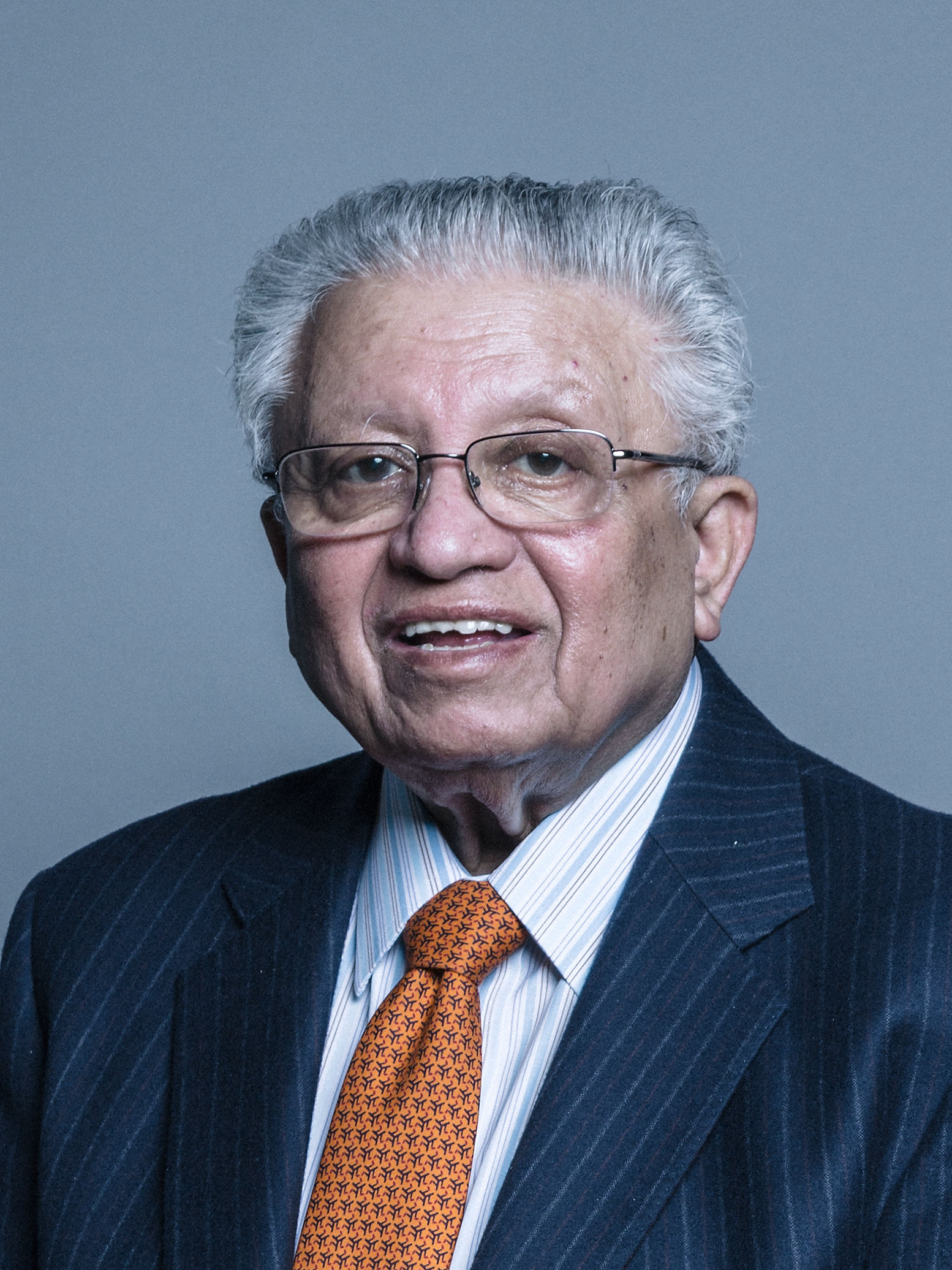
- Official portrait, 2018

Member of the House of Lords
- Lord Temporal
- Life peerage 3 June 2004 – 1 March 2019

Personal details
- Born: Sushanta Kumar Bhattacharyya; 6 June 1940 Dhaka, Bengal Presidency, British India
- Died: 1 March 2019 (aged 78) Birmingham, United Kingdom
- Party: Labour
- Education: Indian Institute of Technology Kharagpur (BTech); University of Birmingham (MS, PhD)
- Known for: Founder of WMG, University of Warwick
- Website: WMG's Page

Sushanta Kumar Bhattacharyya, Baron Bhattacharyya (6 June 1940 – 1 March 2019), was a British-Indian engineer, educator and government advisor. In 1980, he became Professor of Manufacturing Systems at the University of Warwick and founded the Warwick Manufacturing Group. In 2004, he was made a life peer and became a member of the House of Lords.

== Early life and education ==
Sushanta Kumar Bhattacharyya was born on 6 June 1940 to a Bengali Brahmin family in Dhaka. He was the elder son of Sudhir Kumar Bhattacharyya (1909–1987) and Hemanalini Chakravarti. The Bhattacharyyas were an aristocratic zamindar family based in the Dacca district of the Bengal Presidency of British India (now Bangladesh). At the time, his father, a distinguished professor of physical chemistry and subsequently Fellow of the Indian National Science Academy, was a professor at the Indian Institute of Science in Bangalore, where Bhattacharyya spent the first 12 years of his life. In 1952, upon his father's appointment as head of the chemistry department at the new Indian Institute of Technology, Kharagpur, the family moved to Kharagpur.

Bhattacharyya studied at Hijli High School, situated inside IIT Kharagpur campus & then studied Mechanical Engineering at the Indian Institute of Technology, Kharagpur, successfully sought honours and titles, taking his Bachelor of Technology (BTech) degree in 1960. The following year, he moved to Britain, where he worked for six years as a graduate apprentice at Lucas Industries, a large British manufacturing company. During this time, he studied at the University of Birmingham, where he was awarded a Master of Science (MSc) degree in engineering production and management, followed by a PhD in engineering production in 1970. While completing his PhD at Birmingham, he was appointed as a lecturer and began the process of establishing a manufacturing education programme for industry there.

== Career and research ==
In 1980, he moved to the University of Warwick and, with the support of Vice-Chancellor Jack Butterworth, he founded WMG (Warwick Manufacturing Group) of which he served as chairman until his death. WMG is now one of the largest academic departments of the university and is known for its collaborative research and education programmes with industry. During this time, he was instrumental in brokering significant partnerships for UK manufacturing including the takeover of Jaguar Land Rover by Indian firm Tata Motors in 2008 and the investment in the National Automotive Innovation Centre at the University of Warwick.

Lord Bhattacharyya's contribution to innovation in academia and industry led to several prime ministerial visits to WMG. Margaret Thatcher called Bhattacharyya "a true pioneer" in a 1990 speech opening WMG's Advanced Technology Centre. A decade later, Labour Prime Minister Tony Blair said WMG was "an outstanding example of combining academic excellence with industrial relevance." In a 2007 speech, Blair's successor, Gordon Brown, said that WMG "provides a prime example of how the knowledge created in our universities can be transferred to make a difference in the real world".

In 2016, Prime Minister Theresa May visited WMG with Chancellor Philip Hammond as part of her government's development of a UK Industrial Strategy.

Bhattacharyya was appointed a Commander of the Order of the British Empire (CBE) in the 1997 New Year Honours and knighted in 2003. On 3 June 2004, he was created a life peer as Baron Bhattacharyya of Moseley in the County of West Midlands. He sat on the Labour benches in the House of Lords.

In 2014, he was elected a Fellow of the Royal Society (FRS). He was also a Fellow of the Royal Academy of Engineering and a number of other professional bodies including the Institution of Engineering and Technology, Institution of Mechanical Engineers, Indian National Academy of Engineering and the Chartered Institute of Logistics and Transport.

Kumar Bhattacharyya was a past member of the UK Council for Science and Technology and a past board member of Advantage West Midlands, the West Midlands Regional Development Agency (RDA). He also served as a scientific adviser to the government of South Africa. He sat on the Policy Advisory Council of the Institute for Public Policy Research and served on the National Consumer Council from 1990 to 1993.

=== House of Lords ===
Kumar Bhattacharyya sat on the Labour benches in the House of Lords. His focus was on policy areas such as business and industry, economy and finance, education, international affairs and science and technology. Throughout his career, he was a passionate advocate for engineering innovation and the revival of British industry. Lord Baker paid tribute to his enormous contribution to technical education in the UK as "quite remarkable".

=== Books ===
In 2002, Andrew Lorenz wrote a book about Bhattacharyya's career and the growth of WMG, entitled Kumar Bhattacharyya: The Unsung Guru.

=== Awards and honours ===
- 1992: Doctor of the University (DUniv) awarded by University of Surrey.
- 1997: Awarded CBE for Services to Industry and Technology; Honorary Doctorate of Science (DSc) awarded by University of Technology, Malaysia (also holds Honorary Professorship).
- 1998: Mensforth International Gold Medal for outstanding international contribution to manufacturing engineering and management – Institution of Electrical Engineers.
- 1999: Sir Robert Lawrence Award for Services to Logistics – Institute for Logistics and Transport.
- 2002: Padma Bhushan awarded by President of India for services to Science and Technology.
- 2003: Knighthood for Services to Higher Education and Industry; Honorary Doctor of Business Administration (DBA) awarded by Hong Kong Polytechnic University (also holds honorary professorship).
- 2004: Life Peer as Baron Bhattacharyya, of Moseley in the County of West Midlands; Honorary D.Eng. awarded by University of Birmingham.
- 2005: The Duncan Davies Medal for outstanding contribution to research and development in the UK – The Research and Development Society.
- 2008: Honorary Doctorate of Science (DSc) from IIT Kharagpur.
- 2011: Honorary Membership – Society of Manufacturing Engineers (SME) given for ability and stature, plus contribution of substantial skills and talent to accomplish the goals of the society.
- 2013: Honorary DSc – Indian Institute of Technology Bhubaneswar, presented by the president of India.
- 2014: Coventry Award of Merit for outstanding personal achievement in raising the status of UK engineering and manufacturing and for his service to the promotion of the University of Warwick and the City of Coventry.
- 2014: Elected as Fellow of The Royal Society for his contribution to engineering research and education.
- 2015: Made Honorary Freeman of the City of Coventry, alongside Ratan Tata.
- 2016: WMG awarded a Regius Professorship, Lord Bhattacharyya becoming Regius Professor of Manufacturing (Engineering).
- 2017: Received the Great Wall Friendship Award, described as "Beijing's highest award for foreign experts" from Beijing Acting Mayor Mr. Chen Jining on behalf of the People's Government of Beijing Municipality.
- 2017: Received the China Friendship Award, described as "China's highest honor granted to a foreigner" from Vice-Premier Ma Kai.
- 2018: Honorary D.Phil. from the University of York
- 2018: Honorary Doctorate from the University of Science and Technology, Beijing.
- 2018: Honorary Doctorate from the Kalinga Institute of Industrial Technology, Bhubaneswar, Odisha.
- 2018: Honorary Doctorate from the Indian Institute of Information Technology, Allahabad.
- 2018: Awarded Zienkiewicz medal by Swansea University and delivered the Swansea University College of Engineering annual Zienkiewicz Lecture.

His nomination for the Royal Society reads:

"Kumar Bhattacharyya is the founder and leader of the Warwick Manufacturing Group (WMG) whose mission is to improve the competitiveness of industry through innovative collaborative research, educational and knowledge transfer programmes WMG employs over 300 staff with a similar number seconded from industry. It has a global reputation in automotive research, the built environment, digital technology and healthcare systems. Kumar Bhattacharyya was the primary architect of the Integrated Graduate Development Scheme, now considered best practice in CPD by many Universities, and was the first to run the Eng Doc programme on similar principles. In 30 years, the Education programmes have involved over 25,000 individuals and over 500 UK companies. Bhattacharyya has received many international honours, awards and honorary doctorates."

Named after Lord Bhattacharyya

In November 2018, Coventry City Council deputy leader Abdul Khan announced that the council had asked the University of Warwick to rename part of University Road as Lord Bhattacharyya Way. The university agreed, and additionally announced that the UK's National Automotive Innovation Centre building, which will be sited on Lord Bhattacharyya Way, would be named The Lord Bhattacharyya building.

== Personal life ==
Bhattacharyya and his Irish wife, Bridget, had three daughters, Anita, Tina and Malini. As well as Bengali and English, he either spoke or understood Hindi, Tamil and Telugu. He wrote a regular opinion column for the Birmingham Post.

== Death ==
Professor Lord Bhattacharyya died on 1 March 2019 following a short illness.
