= Duncan Davies Medal =

English research award

The Duncan Davies Medal is a medal of Research and Development Society to "an individual who has made an outstanding contribution toward making the UK the best-performing research and development environment in the world.". The medal is named in honor of Duncan S. Davies (1921–1987), a prominent figure in British science and government.

Recipients of the Duncan Davies Medal are typically invited to give a public lecture or address on a topic related to R&D and innovation in the UK.

== Recipients ==
- 1990 Robert Malpas – Marketing the Future
- 1991 Sir Austin Bide – The influence of science and technology on social progress
- 1992 Brian Newbould – The Birth And Growth Of The Pharmaceutical Industry
- 1993 Derek Roberts – How To Get The Best Out Of Academic Research
- 1994 Sir Robin Nicholson – Industrial R&D In The UK: A New Future?
- 1995 David McMurtry – Cost-Effective R&D In A Small High-Tech Environment
- 1996 Sir Geoffrey Allen – A Sporting Attitude To R&D
- 1997 Sir Richard Sykes – Science In The Business Context: Turning Technology Into Health And Wealth
- 1998 Alan Rudge – Research, Relevance, And The Road To Ruin
- 1999 Sir Peter Williams – Barriers To Innovation: Myth Or Reality?
- 2000 Lord Bragg – Enhancing The Level Of Public Debate On Scientific Matters
- 2001 Philip Ruffles – Linking Research & Development To Corporate Strategy And Growth
- 2002 Richard Brook – Maecenas And The Multitude: Reflections On Peer Review
- 2003 Lord Sainsbury – Exploiting R&D At Regional Level
- 2004 Dame Bridget Ogilvie – The Quixotic Nature Of The Involvement Of The Community In The Development Of New Medical Treatments
- 2005 Lord Bhattacharya – The Expanding World Of Technology
- 2006 Sir Tom McKillop – The Challenges of Innovation
- 2007 Sir Robin Saxby – From start up in a barn in Cambridge to global standard and beyond
- 2008 Sir David King – The challenges of the 21st century
- 2009 Dame Wendy Hall – Research 2.0: the Age of Networks
- 2010 Dame Sue Ion - Fuel for thought – meeting the energy challenges of the 21st Century
