= David Oxley =

English actor (1920–1985)

- in Yesterday's Enemy (1959)
- Born: 7 November 1920; Wellington, Somerset, England
- Died: 30 October 1985 (aged 64); Málaga, Andalusia, Spain
- Education: Royal Central School of Speech and Drama
- Occupation: Actor
- Years active: 1947-75

David Oxley (7 November 1920 – 30 October 1985) was an English actor who made many film, television and stage appearances over a 28-year period. He is best known for portraying Gilles de Rais in Saint Joan (1957), Sir Hugo Baskerville in The Hound of the Baskervilles (1959) and for the major role of Captain W. Stanley Moss in Ill Met by Moonlight (1957), based on the true story of the Kidnap of General Kreipe in 1944.

Oxley was noted for his striking presence, as he had an extraordinarily powerful voice that he used to great effect, being able to fill an auditorium without the aid of microphones, and seen to best effect as Sir Hugo Baskerville. He trained at the Central School of Dramatic Art in 1946. His stage work included early appearances at Stratford, as well as touring New Zealand with J. C. Williamson Theatres in 1961 as Henry Higgins, in one of two original Australasian productions of My Fair Lady. Oxley suffered a stroke in October 1985 whilst sunbathing at his hotel in Málaga, Spain. His friend, author Graham Murray, was at his bed-side when he died.

He also appeared in Bonjour Tristesse (1958), Sea Fury (1958), Yesterday's Enemy (1959), Life at the Top (1965), Bunny Lake Is Missing (1965) and House of the Living Dead (1974). His television appearances included Danger Man (1960).

== Filmography ==
Year	Title	Role	Notes
1950	The Elusive Pimpernel	Captain Duroc	
1952	The Armchair Detective	Terry	
1954	Beau Brummell	Footman	Uncredited
1954	Svengali	Dodor	
1957	Ill Met by Moonlight	Captain W. Stanley Moss, M.C.	
1957	Saint Joan	'Bluebeard' - Gilles de Rais	
1957	Black Ice	Matt	
1958	Bonjour Tristesse	Jacques	
1958	Sea Fury	Blanco	
1959	The Hound of the Baskervilles	Sir Hugo	
1959	Yesterday's Enemy	Doctor	
1965	Life at the Top	Doctor	
1965	Bunny Lake Is Missing	Tim	
1974	Oh Brother..!	Edward Kingsley	
1974	House of the Living Dead	Dr. Collinson	(final film role)
