= WMG Academy for Young Engineers, Solihull =

WMG Academy for Young Engineers (Solihull)

Location
- Chelmsley Road, Chelmsley Wood; Birmingham, B37 5FD; England; 52°28′57″N 1°44′32″W

Information
- Type: University Technical College
- Established: 2015
- Local authority: Solihull
- Department for Education URN: 142900 Tables
- Ofsted: Reports
- Chair of Governors: Christine Ennew
- Associate Principal: Claire Morris
- Gender: Mixed
- Age: 14 to 19
- Enrolment: 640
- Website: http://solihull.wmgacademy.org.uk/

The WMG Academy for Young Engineers (Solihull) is a mixed university technical college in Solihull which opened in 2016. It caters for students aged 14–19.

The Academy is part of the same trust as the WMG Academy for Young Engineers, Coventry. It is sponsored by WMG, University of Warwick.
