= Ray Austin (director) =

British director (1932–2023)

- Austin in The Saint, 1963
- Born: 5 December 1932; London, UK
- Died: 17 May 2023 (aged 90); Virginia, US
- Occupations: Television and film director; Television writer and producer; Crime novelist
- Years active: 1955–2023
- Spouses: Yasuko Nagazumi (m. 1976; div. 1983) Wendy DeVere Knight-Wilton (m. 1984)

Raymond Austin (5 December 1932 – 17 May 2023) was a British television and film director, television writer and producer, and stunt performer and actor who worked in both the United Kingdom and the United States.

== Life and career ==
Austin was born in London on 5 December 1932. He started his career as a stunt performer on such films as North by Northwest (1959) and Spartacus (1960). From 1965 to 1967 he served as stunt coordinator on 50 episodes of The Avengers. For The Champions he initially became involved as a second unit director, subsequently rising to the position of full director.

His work as a television director included episodes of The Avengers (1968), Randall and Hopkirk (Deceased) (1969–70), Space: 1999 (1975–76), four episodes of Vega$,The New Avengers (1976–77), and V (1984). He directed 50 of the 88 episodes of the series Zorro, which was filmed in Madrid between 1989 and 1992 for the American ABC Family channel. He had also directed some made-for-TV films, including The Return of the Man from U.N.C.L.E. (1983), and some feature films such as 1,000 Convicts and a Woman (1971), Virgin Witch (1972), and House of the Living Dead (1974).

The Guinness World Records states that "In 1965, Dame Diana Rigg (UK) became the first western actress to perform kung fu on Television when the combat choreographers Ray Austin (UK) and Chee Soo (UK/China) worked elements of the martial art into her fight scenes on The Avengers. Certificate presentation was done on The New Paul O'Grady Show."

== Personal life and death ==
In 1976, Austin married actress Yasuko Nagazumi, who performed in some of the series he worked on, notably Space: 1999. His step-daughter, Miki Berenyi of the band Lush, describes her relationship with him in part 1 of her memoir Fingers Crossed. He later divorced Nagazumi and married British producer and writer Wendy DeVere Knight-Wilton in 1984; they later lived in Earlysville, Virginia, US.

Austin died at his home in Virginia on 17 May 2023, at the age of 90.

=== Television ===
==== Stunts ====
- Highway Patrol, 1955–59 (stunt performer)
- Thunder Road, 1958 (stunt performer)
- North by Northwest, 1959 (stunt performer)
- Operation Petticoat, 1959 (stunt performer)
- Spartacus, 1960 (stunt performer)
- The Sundowners, 1960 (stunt performer)
- Have Gun – Will Travel, 1957–63 (performer)
- Peter Gunn, 1958–60, 1960–61 (performer)
- Guns of Navarone, 1961 (stunt performer)
- Saturday Night and Sunday Morning, 1961 (stunt arranger)
- The Loneliness of the Long Distance Runner, 1962 (stunt arranger)
- Tarzan, 1963 (stunt performer)
- Tom Jones, 1963 (stunt arranger)
- Cleopatra, 1963 (stunt arranger)
- The Dirty Dozen, 1967 (stunt performer)
- The Avengers (arranger)

==== Actor ====
- The Saint, 1963–64, 1966
- The Loneliness of the Long Distance Runner, 1962 (Mr Clay)
- Tom Jones, 1963 (Thug)
- Clash by Night, 1963 (Intruder)
- The V.I.P.s, 1963 (Chauffeur)
- Ghost Squad, 1964
- The Avengers, 1965

==== Director ====
- The Baron, 1966
- The Saint, 1968 (2 episodes)
- The Avengers, 1968 (2 episodes)
- The Champions, 1968
- Journey to the Unknown, 1968–69
- The Ugliest Girl in Town, 1968–69
- Department S, 1969 (4 episodes)
- Randall and Hopkirk (Deceased), 1969–70 (6 episodes)
- Strange Report, 1971
- Shirley's World, 1971–72
- The Adventures of Black Beauty, 1974
- Space: 1999, 1975–76
- The New Avengers, 1976 (1 episode)
- The Hardy Boys/Nancy Drew Mysteries, 1977–79
- W.E.B., 1978
- The Professionals, 1978 (2 episodes)
- Return of the Saint, 1978 (1 episode)
- Barnaby Jones, 1978 (1 episode)
- Sword of Justice, 1978 (2 episodes)
- Vega$, 1978–81
- Salvage 1, 1979 (2 episodes)
- A Man Called Sloane, 1979 (1 episode)
- Hawaii Five-O, 1979 (1 episode)
- B. J. and the Bear, 1979–80 (1 episode)
- Hart to Hart, 1979–80, 1984 (5 episodes)
- Wonder Woman, 1979
- From Here to Eternity, 1980
- The Love Boat, 1980 (4 episodes)
- House Calls, 1980–82
- Quincy, M.E., 1981 (2 episodes)
- Magnum, P.I., 1981–86
- Simon & Simon, 1982 (2 episodes)
- Tales of the Gold Monkey, 1982 (pilot episode)
- The Mississippi, 1983–84
- The Return of the Man from U.N.C.L.E., 1983 (pilot)
- Jessie, 1984
- The Master, 1984
- Airwolf, 1984 (1 episode)
- The Fall Guy, 1984 (2 episodes)
- Lime Street, 1985, 1987 (5 episodes, including pilot)
- V, 1985 (1 episode)
- Our House, 1986–87
- The Return of the Six Million Dollar Man and the Bionic Woman, 1987 (film)
- Snoops, 1989
- The New Alfred Hitchcock Presents, 1989 (3 episodes)
- Zorro, 1992
- The Boys of Twilight, 1992
- Highlander: The Series, 1992–93 (5 episodes)
- JAG, 1996–97 (7 episodes)
- Pensacola: Wings of Gold, 1997 (1 episode)
- Police Academy: The Series, 1997–98 (5 episodes)
- Silk Stalkings, 1997 (1 episode)
- CI5: The New Professionals, 1999 (5 episodes)

==== Writer ====
- Randall and Hopkirk (Deceased), 1969
- Department S, 1971
- Shirley's World, 1971–72
- The Adventures of Black Beauty, 1974
- Magnum, P.I., 1980–86
- Hart to Hart, 1984
- The Master, 1984
- The Zany Adventures of Robin Hood, 1984 (TV film)
- Airwolf, 1985
- Lime Street, 1985
- Spenser: For Hire, 1986
- Our House, 1986–88

==== Producer ====
- Shirley's World, 1971–72
- JAG, 1995–96, 1997
- The New Avengers
- Zorro

=== Film ===
==== Stunts ====
- North by Northwest, 1959 (stunt performer)
- Operation Petticoat, 1959 (stunt performer)
- Spartacus, 1960 (stunt performer)
- Saturday Night and Sunday Morning, 1961 (stunt arranger)
- The Loneliness of the Long Distance Runner, 1962 (stunt arranger)
- Cleopatra, 1963 (stunt arranger)
- Tom Jones, 1963 (stunt arranger)

==== Director ====
- Saturday Night and Sunday Morning, 1961 (second unit)
- Fun and Games, 1971
- Virgin Witch, 1972
- House of the Living Dead, 1973

==== Actor ====
- The Loneliness of the Long Distance Runner (1962) as Craig
- The V.I.P.s (1963) as Rolls-Royce chauffeur
- Clash by Night (1963) as Intruder

=== Novelist ===
- Beauford Sloan Mysteries series:
  - The Eagle Heist (2002)
  - Dead Again (2002)
  - Your Turn to Die (2006)
- Keep Running Or Die (2020)
- Love Loves A Mystery (2020)
- Home For The Holiday (2021)
