= The Westwood Academy =

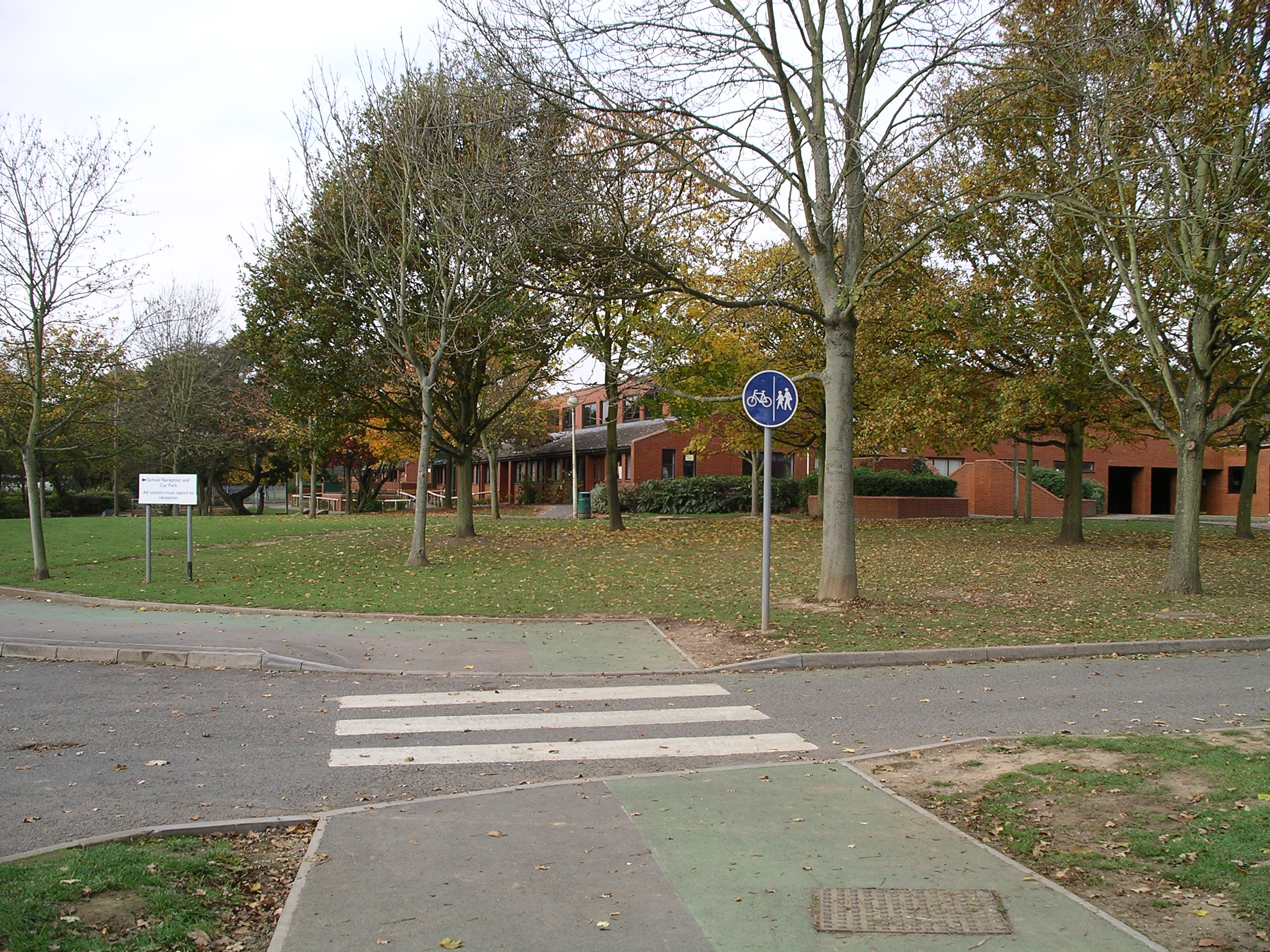

Location
- Mitchell Avenue; Coventry, West Midlands, CV4 8DY; England; 52.3902°N 1.5704°W

Information
- Type: Academy
- Motto: Where better never stops
- Trust: Kenilworth multi-academy trust
- Department for Education URN: 137225 Tables
- Ofsted: Reports
- Head teacher: Deborah Talbot
- Gender: Coeducational
- Age: 11 to 18
- Enrolment: 611 As of April 2021
- Capacity: 864
- Website: http://thewestwoodacademy.co.uk/

The Westwood Academy (formerly The Westwood School) is an academy school for children aged 11–18 in Canley, Coventry, England. Its sports centre was completed in July 2008.

== History ==
Opened in September 1974 as Alderman Callow School and Community College, named after the former Lord Mayor of Coventry (1961), Alderman William Callow.

In 2008, The Westwood School converted to 'Trust' school status with the Local Authority, Warwick University, Coventry Sports Foundation and a local ICT company. The school gained The BECTA ICT Mark in recognition of its use of ICT in teaching and learning (the only school in Coventry to have gained this award).

The school was previously known as Alderman Callow School and Community College, built to serve the nearby Canley housing estate; however the estate was never completed to its original anticipated size, meaning the school has always had a significantly smaller intake than other schools in Coventry. It was designated a Specialist Technology College in September 2004. This is an area with considerable social deprivation. The student population is predominantly White British, although other ethnic heritages are represented. The number of students who have learning difficulties or disabilities, and the proportion who are eligible for free school meals, are higher than average.

It converted to an academy in August 2011.

In 2019 joined the Kenilworth Multi Academy Trust as a partner school.

== Academics ==
Virtually all maintained schools and academies follow the National Curriculum, and are inspected by Ofsted on how well they succeed in delivering a 'broad and balanced curriculum'. Schools endeavour to get all students to achieve the English Baccalaureate (EBACC) qualification; this must include core subjects, a modern or ancient foreign language, and either History or Geography.

The school operates a three-year Key Stage 3, where all the core National Curriculum subjects are taught. There is a sophisticated system of setting into broad bands, that is driven by students' previous exposure to Spanish or French at primary school, and the results in their Key Stage 2 tests. Pupils are set by ability in Mathematics and Science, and communication groups in English, Computing, RE, Geography and History. They also have classes in PE, Drama, Technology, Art, Music & Dance, and Spanish or French.

In Years 10 and 11 (Key Stage 4) students study a core of English Language, English Literature, Mathematics, Double Award Science, and Non-exam Core PE. They choose at least one further EBAC subject: either History, Geography, or Computer Science.

They can choose a further two GCSEs to create a personalised curriculum which matches their skills and abilities. The subjects currently offered are: Music, Drama, History, Engineering, BTEC Sport, GCSE PE Food Technology, ICT, Geography, Business, Art, Health and Social Care, and Computing.

Most pupils will choose to study a language as an additional GCSE, with slightly less curriculum time being allocated to Maths and English.

== Sports ==
Students from the Westwood school benefit from the facilities of the adjacent Xcel Leisure Centre (which also serves as the head office for Coventry Sports Foundation, now operating as CV Life). These facilities include astro turf pitches, which are used by Westwood school students until 5 pm.

== Notable former pupils ==
- Tamla Kari, British actress
- Paul Boileau, Oxfordshire Property Investor and Business Leader.
- Angela Lamont, TV presenter (It'll Never Work) and keynote speaker

== See also ==
- WMG Academy for Young Engineers, Coventry
