= Yasuko Nagazumi =

Japanese businesswoman and former actress (born 1943)

- 永積靖子
- Born: 1943 (age 82–83); Tokyo, Japan
- Occupations: Businesswoman; actress
- Years active: 1967–1983 (actress)
- Spouses: Ivan Berenyi; Ray Austin (m. 1976; div. 1983)
- Children: Miki Berenyi

Yasuko Nagazumi (永積靖子, Nagazumi Yasuko; born 1943) is a Japanese producer, manager, and former actress.

== Careers ==
She is responsible for print advertising campaigns on behalf of clients such as Armani, Donna Karan, Guess?, Pirelli and Vogue magazine, working with photographers such as Peter Lindbergh, Herb Ritts, Helmut Newton and others.

A former actress, she is best known for her roles in British television as a regular cast member of the 1970s series The Protectors (as Suki) and Space: 1999 (as Yasko). She also appeared in the Bulldog Drummond film Deadlier Than the Male (1967), the James Bond film You Only Live Twice (1967), the TV spin-off film Wombling Free (1977), the World War II comedy series It Ain't Half Hot Mum, and the TV series From Here to Eternity.

== Personal life ==
She has a daughter, Miki Berenyi, who was the lead singer and guitarist of the English alternative rock band Lush.

== Filmography ==
Year	Title	Role	Notes
1967	Deadlier Than the Male	Mitsouko	
1967	You Only Live Twice	Bath Girl #4	Uncredited
1975	Rollerball	Masseuse	Uncredited
1977	Wombling Free	Doris Takahashi	
1976	Space: 1999	Yasko	
