= Ch'ang Ming =

Series of Taoist dietary recommendations

Ch'ang Ming (長命 Pinyin: Chángmìng) (literally "long life") is a series of dietary and health recommendations based on Taoist philosophy. It was first introduced to the West by Chan Kam Lee (李陈金 Pinyin: Lǐ chén jīn), a Taoist teacher and Chinese herbal medicine practitioner who came to London in 1930 from Shandong Province in China. He took the Taoist principles of Traditional Chinese Medicine and adapted them to Western foods and eating habits.

== History ==
Ch'ang Ming gained popularity in the West when Chee Soo, a student of Chan Kam Lee, published his book "The Tao of Long Life" in 1979. The paperback edition published in 1982 which was acquired by HarperCollins and translated into several different languages is still available. As well as dietary guidelines this book contains information about Taoist philosophy, the nutritional values of various foods' vitamin and mineral content, a list of useful herbs, and information about Traditional Chinese Medicine diagnosis. Chang Ming is not just a diet but is also a method of preventative medicine whereby people can learn how to avoid illnesses through simple methods of the Eight principles and five elements principles of diagnosis and understanding the causes of illnesses according to Traditional Chinese Medicine. Chee Soo ran a herbal clinic in London in the 1970s and used the Ch'ang Ming approach to help people with various illnesses. When he came to Coventry in 1982, he taught Ch'ang Ming as part of a program of Health and Massage courses. He also published several books which include details of the Ch'ang Ming diet which was recommended to be used in conjunction with other methods of Traditional Chinese Medicine such as Anmo or Taoist massage, daoyin breathing exercises, K'ai Men Qigong, herbal therapy and contact thermogenesis or heat treatment (including moxibustion).

== Basic principles ==
The basic principles of Ch'ang Ming are to eat natural, organic wholefoods which have been grown without the use of artificial fertilizers or pesticides, which do not contain chemical additives, and which are locally grown and in season. Highly refined and processed foods are to be avoided and food should be cooked as little as possible to retain all the vital nutrients.

"The colourings, flavourings, additives, preservatives, artificial fruit acids and so on that are contained in the packaged and canned foods on sale in supermarkets and shops greatly add to the amount of chemicals regularly consumed, plus the drugs taken for illnesses, by the average Westerner. Added to all this, a great many things that are eaten contain residues of pesticides, detergents, and so forth. The strain of the human body trying to cope with such toxic matter that you consume every day of your life is considerable and in addition, there are the natural toxins and acids that the body produces during its own daily work which weaken the metabolism and make it a prey to ill health when it need not be."

Some common foods are considered poisonous: "There are a number of vegetables that contain poison and so are best left alone. These are potatoes, tomatoes, aubergines (egg-plants), spinach and rhubarb which contain solanine or oxalic poison and these are harmful to the nervous system, create apathy, reduce the efficiency of the mind, and have other ill effects."

Although it is not a strictly vegetarian diet it advocates reducing consumption of meat especially red meat and animals which include a lot of animal fats. The basic principle of this approach is to eat mostly Yang foods and avoid Yin fresh fruit and cold energy foods such as citrus fruit, although the approach is also to eat locally grown seasonal fruit and vegetables. This means the diet varies depending on location and local climate.

== Foods to avoid ==
1. Refined and processed foods. If any colourings, preservatives, flavourings, or other chemicals are included, don't touch it.
2. Any grain foods that have been processed, especially white bread and anything made from white flour.
3. All deep fried foods.
4. Coffee, alcohol, tobacco, chocolate and other sweets.
5. Spices, rock salt, mustard, pepper, vinegar, pickles, curry.
6. Meat such as pork, beef, mutton and lamb.
7. Salmon, mackerel, shark, swordfish, tuna and whale.
8. Sugar.
9. Ice cream, artificial jellies, synthetic fruit juices.
10. Potatoes, tomatoes, aubergines, rhubarb, spinach.
11. Concentrated meat extracts, soups and gravies.
12. Milk, cheese, butter, dairy yoghurt, boiled or fried eggs.
13. Lard or dripping that comes from animal fats.
14. Any bird or fish that has a lot of fat tissue.

== Foods that may be eaten. ==
1. Anything made from natural whole grain, that has not been refined, e.g. brown rice, buckwheat, wheat, barley, millet, rye, maize and includes bread, cakes, puddings, biscuits, breakfast foods, etc.
2. All locally grown vegetables that are in season, especially root vegetables, excluding those items in previous list, No. 10.
3. Soya-bean and mung-bean shoots.
4. Seaweed.
5. Locally grown fruit and berries (moderately).
6. Nuts, preferably roasted—but not salted.
7. Low fat natural yoghurt.
8. Honey (sparingly).
9. Cottage cheese or vegetarian cheese.
10. Herb teas and China teas.
11. Vegetable margarine and oils (e.g. sesame, sunflower, safflower).
12. Eggs, but only scrambled or in omelettes—better still eat the yolks only.
13. Natural sea salt, sesame seed salt, soya sauce.
14. All dried fruits—cherries, raisins, currants etc.
15. All grain milks, rice milk and coconut milk.
16. Wild vegetables and herbs.
17. Fruit drinks made from locally grown fresh fruit—ideally, make your own.

=== Use the following, if necessary. ===
1. Non-fat fish excluding those in Food to avoid list, No. 7.
2. Seafood—shrimps, prawns etc. But be wary of crab.
3. Wild birds—pheasant, pigeon etc.
4. Wild or free range chicken, turkey etc.
5. Skimmed milk or powdered skimmed milk.
