= WMG, University of Warwick =

University of Warwick department, England

Coordinates: 52.3833°N 1.5610°W

WMG
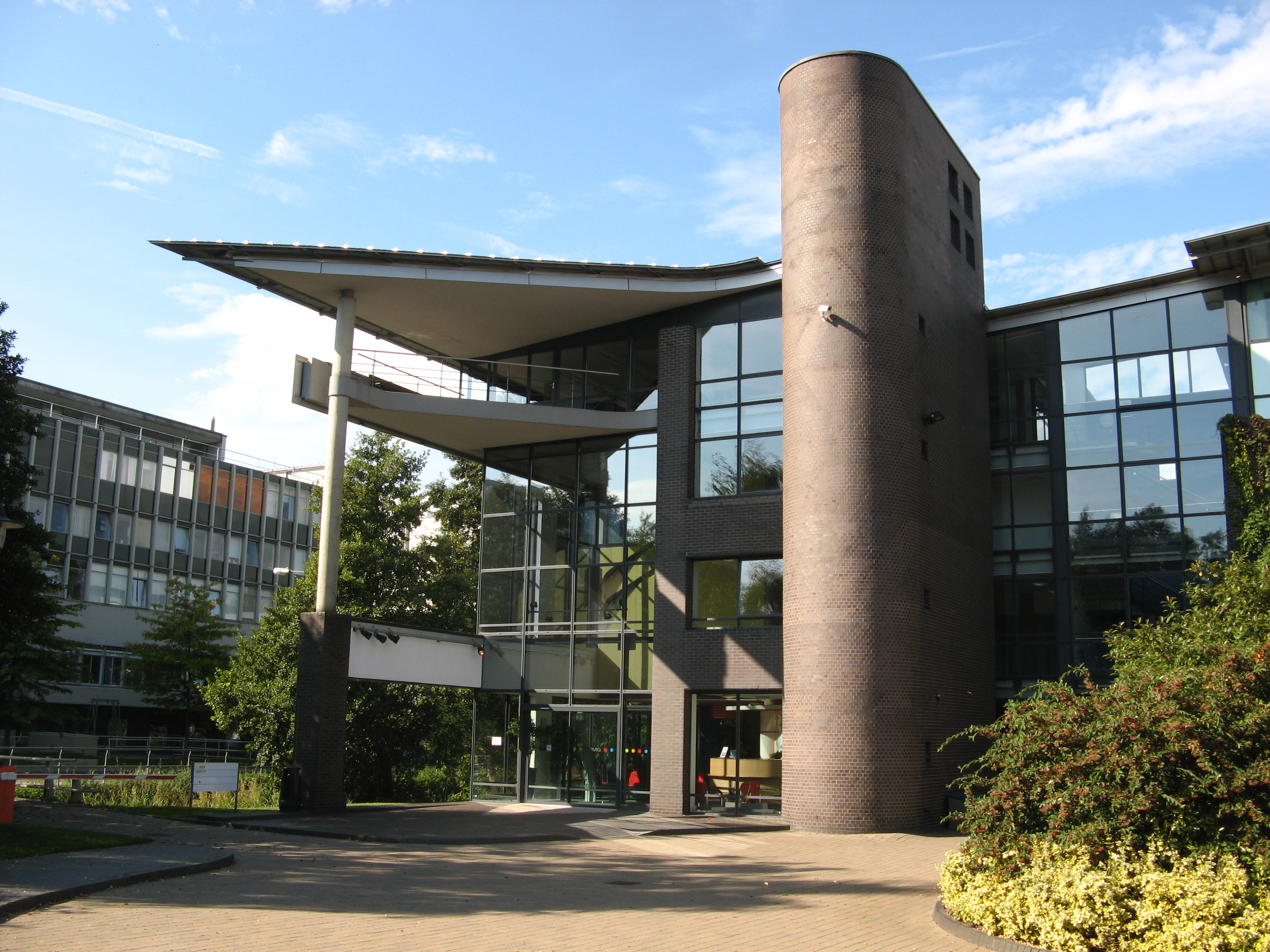
- Entrance to the International Manufacturing Centre at WMG, University of Warwick
- Established: 1980
- Dean: Professor Kerry Kirwan
- Location: Coventry, United Kingdom
- Campus: Semi-rural (University of Warwick)
- Website: warwick.ac.uk/fac/sci/wmg

Warwick Manufacturing Group (WMG), University of Warwick, is a UK-based research and education group combining collaborative research and development with education programmes working in applied science, technology and engineering. An academic department of the University of Warwick and a centre of the High Value Manufacturing Catapult, WMG was founded by Kumar Bhattacharyya in 1980.

== History ==
Warwick Manufacturing Group was founded in 1980 by Kumar Bhattacharyya to support UK manufacturing through research and knowledge transfer (Bhattacharyya, made a life peer in 2004, became chairman of WMG). Its first venture was a part-time master's degree for senior industry staff; this considered technology and management as a unified whole, with modules taught at a purpose-built residential centre. The course proved popular with industry and companies began to send staff to WMG in greater numbers.

Bhattacharya then decided to provide industry-related research services too, convincing the university to loan money for a centre where academics could collaborate with industrialists on the development of new products for the aerospace and automotive industries. The advanced technology centre was officially opened on 8 January 1990 by Margaret Thatcher and its success (and the income generated) allowed WMG to build two further buildings to enable expansion into other areas, including healthcare, construction, pharmaceuticals, mining, information technology and food and drink where learning from the manufacturing industry could be applied to similar processes and services.

Several subsequent British prime ministers visited WMG. Tony Blair visited WMG during the 1997 and 2001 election campaigns. Gordon Brown laid the foundation stone of WMG's International Digital Laboratory shortly before becoming Prime Minister and stated that "WMG's work is based on very strong collaboration with industry and provides a prime example of how the knowledge created in our universities can be transferred to make a difference in the real world".

In 2009, WMG was awarded the Queen's Anniversary Prize for Higher and Further Education, formally presented at a ceremony at Buckingham Palace on 19 February 2010.

In 2011, WMG accounted for 30 per cent of the University's research activity and had over 2,500 postgraduate students, 650 studying full-time at Warwick. Twenty of 450 staff, and 10 per cent of its £120 million annual research budget, was funded by the Higher Education Funding Council for England.

UK Prime Minister Theresa May and her Chancellor Philip Hammond visited WMG together in 2016. May's visit was later credited with inspiring the Prime Minister to support a British industrial strategy by the Business Secretary, Greg Clark. Clark stated that "Kumar (Lord Bhattacharyya, former chairman of WMG) created this, all those connections, all of those links between education and jobs and technology. During all the time I’ve known Lord Bhattacharyya he’s been a big champion for the West Midlands. One of Theresa May’s first visits as Prime Minister was here and she saw for herself what is possible. As a result, I think the industrial strategy has taken such a prominent position in the post-Brexit plan".

WMG has links in China, where WMG has been engaged since the 1980s, and in India, where it helped establish a technical university.

== Research ==
Research is organised into a number of research groups covering design, materials, manufacturing, systems and business research. Areas of focus include business innovation, low-carbon mobility and healthcare. Further programmes focus on supporting small to medium-sized enterprises through projects such as the National Business to Business Centre, the West Midlands Collaborative Commerce Marketplace and the International Institute for Product and Service Innovation.

WMG is a partner in the Technology Strategy Board's High Value Manufacturing Catapult.

WMG is also home to the Institute of Digital Healthcare, a partnership with Warwick Medical School which aims to bring improvements to health and wellbeing through innovative digital technologies and services.

Past research programmes have included the Premium Automotive Research and Development (PARD) Programme, the Low Carbon Vehicle Technology Project (LCVTP), the Premium Vehicle Customer Interface Technologies (PVCIT) Centre and the Vehicle Energy Facility.

== Education ==
WMG provides undergraduate engineering courses (in conjunction with the School of Engineering), including a full-time undergraduate BSc Cyber Security course.

However, its student population is mainly postgraduate students engaged in:

- Full-time master's degrees in management, engineering, technology operations and business
- Part-time professional programmes for those working in industry
- Overseas programmes
- PhD and Engineering Doctorate (EngD) programmes

WMG also offers specialised courses in supply chain management and e-business management.

WMG is a partner in the WMG Academy Trust, which operates WMG Academy for Young Engineers in Coventry and Solihull, university technical colleges sponsored by the University of Warwick.

=== Buildings ===
WMG is made up of 13 buildings, including:

- Professor Lord Bhattacharyya Building
- Degree Apprenticeship Centre (DAC)
- Energy Innovation Centre, formerly the International Automotive Research Centre (EIC)
- International Manufacturing Centre (IMC)
- Materials Engineering Centre (MEC)
- Advanced Materials Manufacturing Centre (AMMC)
- Engineering Management Building (EMB)
- International Digital Laboratory - completed 2008 (IDL)
- International Institute for Product and Service Innovation - completed in 2012 (IIPSI)
- International Institute for Nanocomposites Manufacturing - completed in 2014 (IINM)
