= New York Edition =

Fiction collection by Henry James

Volume 16 of the 1960s Scribner's reprint of the New York Edition

The New York Edition of Henry James' fiction was a 24-volume collection of the Anglo-American writer's novels, novellas and short stories, originally published in the U.S. and the UK between 1907 and 1909, with a photogravure frontispiece for each volume by Alvin Langdon Coburn. Two more volumes containing James' unfinished novels, The Ivory Tower and The Sense of the Past, were issued in 1917 in a format consistent with the original set. The entire collection was republished during the 1960s by Charles Scribner's Sons. The official title of the set was The Novels and Tales of Henry James, though the more informal title was suggested by James himself and appears as a subtitle on the series title page in each volume. It has been used almost exclusively by subsequent commentators.

== Prefaces ==
James wrote a series of prefaces for the set which have become the focus of intense critical attention. Written in the ornate style of his final years, the prefaces discuss such important topics in the writing of fiction as point of view, the central intelligence of the protagonist, "foreshortening" or the presentation of complex material in a reasonable length, creating the sense of wonder necessary for effective storytelling, the need for attention on the part of the reader, the proper selections and exclusions of additional developments of the original narrative idea, the relationship between narrative art and ordinary human life, and the contrast between romanticism and realism. James also explored the origins of many of his fictions and often recounted personal experiences involved in their writing, such as the distracting beauty of Venice where he wrote much of The Portrait of a Lady.

== Construction and criticism ==
James excluded much of his fiction from the edition, especially many early works from the 1860s, 1870s and 1880s. Critical controversy has swirled around the exclusion of such works as Washington Square and The Europeans. Although he spent a great deal of time and effort on the edition, James' hopes for financial returns were largely disappointed. The edition sold poorly, as James lamented in his letters. To his friend Edmund Gosse, James wrote in 1915:

"That Edition has been, from the point of view of profit either to the publishers or to myself, practically a complete failure; vulgarly speaking, it doesn't sell...[and] has never had the least intelligent critical justice done it—or any sort of critical attention at all paid to it..."

James was an inveterate reviser of his works, and for the edition he made extensive alterations in many of his fictions, especially earlier works like Roderick Hudson and The American. These revisions have also come under extensive critical scrutiny. Some commentators such as F.R. Leavis have decried the revisions as verbose and unnecessary tinkerings with the original, superior versions. Other writers such as Philip Horne have generally favored the revisions as heightening and deepening the effects of James' fiction. A number of biographers and critics, including Leon Edel and Michael Anesko, have discussed the construction of the edition and the compromises James made in selecting and excluding certain works due to commercial demands and his own tastes and preferences.

== List of volumes ==
1. Roderick Hudson
2. The American
3. The Portrait of a Lady (part one)
4. The Portrait of a Lady (part two)
5. The Princess Casamassima (part one)
6. The Princess Casamassima (part two)
7. The Tragic Muse (part one)
8. The Tragic Muse (part two)
9. The Awkward Age
10. The Spoils of Poynton, A London Life, The Chaperon
11. What Maisie Knew, In the Cage, The Pupil
12. The Aspern Papers, The Turn of the Screw, The Liar, The Two Faces
13. The Reverberator, Madame de Mauves, A Passionate Pilgrim, The Madonna of the Future, Louisa Pallant
14. Lady Barbarina, The Siege of London, An International Episode, The Pension Beaurepas, A Bundle of Letters, The Point of View
15. The Lesson of the Master, The Death of the Lion, The Next Time, The Figure in the Carpet, The Coxon Fund
16. The Author of Beltraffio, The Middle Years, Greville Fane, Broken Wings, The Tree of Knowledge, The Abasement of the Northmores, The Great Good Place, Four Meetings, Paste, Europe, Miss Gunton of Poughkeepsie, Fordham Castle
17. The Altar of the Dead, The Beast in the Jungle, The Birthplace, The Private Life, Owen Wingrave, The Friends of the Friends, Sir Edmund Orme, The Real Right Thing, The Jolly Corner, Julia Bride
18. Daisy Miller, Pandora, The Patagonia, The Marriages, The Real Thing, Brooksmith, The Beldonald Holbein, The Story In It, Flickerbridge, Mrs. Medwin
19. The Wings of the Dove (part one)
20. The Wings of the Dove (part two)
21. The Ambassadors (part one)
22. The Ambassadors (part two)
23. The Golden Bowl (part one)
24. The Golden Bowl (part two)
25. The Ivory Tower (issued posthumously 1917)
26. The Sense of the Past (issued posthumously 1917)
