= Julie Rivkin =

American literary critic

Julie H. Rivkin (born 1952) is an American literary critic and professor of English at Connecticut College since 1982. She is best known for her publications on literary theory and Henry James, and has published several works on both subjects. Rivkin received her B.A. and PhD from Yale University and is currently the Associate Dean of Faculty at Connecticut College, a member of the Modern Language Association, and Vice President of the Henry James Society. Her other specializations include American literature and gender studies (publisher of the Henry James Review).

== False Positions ==
In 1996, Rivkin published a book of essays titled False Positions: The Representational Logics of Henry James's Fictions, which explores theoretical complications in Henry James's novels The Ambassadors, The Wings of the Dove, What Maisie Knew, and The Awkward Age.

== Literary Theory: An Anthology ==
In 1998, Rivkin, co-editing with Michael Ryan, published Literary Theory: An Anthology, a comprehensive guide to contemporary Literary Theory which is used in many undergraduate and graduate courses of Literary Theory and cultural criticism at universities and colleges ranging from Dartmouth College to the University of Tennessee. The large anthology covers topics ranging from Russian Formalism to the post-structuralist work of Jacques Derrida and Michel Foucault. It has influenced other books on the subject and has been cited in publications by Bruce McComiskey in English Studies as well as Mary Klage's Literary Theory: A Guide for the Perplexed and other publications on literary theory.
