= Philip Horne =

Philip Horne (born 1957) is a teacher and literary critic specializing in 19th century literature, particularly Henry James and Charles Dickens. Educated at King's College School and Cambridge University, he is currently Professor of English at University College London.

Horne has authored or edited a number of book about Henry James. In 1990 he published Henry James and Revision: The New York Edition, a careful study of the extensive revisions James made in his novels and tales for the many-volumed but ill-fated New York Edition (1907-1909). He published a related article, Henry James at Work: The Question of Our Texts, as part of the 1998 collection of essays, The Cambridge Companion to Henry James edited by Jonathan Freedman. Horne generally favors the late revisions that James made in his fiction, and in his Cambridge Companion essay he emphasizes the importance for the critic of complete acquaintance with the various texts of a James novel or tale:

The serious critic of a fiction by James not only needs to know about its main recent critics, I would argue, but also its early critical history, its critical reception, and James' own remarks about it in the Prefaces and letters. As I have suggested, James's revisions and adaptations can be seen as part of the critical dossier.

Horne has edited two editions of James' works: A London Life and The Reverberator (1989) and The Tragic Muse (1995). Not surprisingly he used the New York Edition texts for all these works, and he included extensive textual notes. Horne has also published an epistolary biography of James, Henry James: A Life in Letters (1999). The book used 296 of James' letters as the framework for a biography that concentrated on the novelist's professional career. Approximately half the letters were previously unpublished. As usual, Horne wrote thorough textual notes on the letters.

Horne published an edition of Oliver Twist in 2003, and has written on such varied topics as telephones and literature, zombies and consumer culture, and the texts of Emily Dickinson. His research interests include the films of Alfred Hitchcock and Martin Scorsese, and publishing history.
