= The Portrait of a Lady =

1881 novel by Henry James

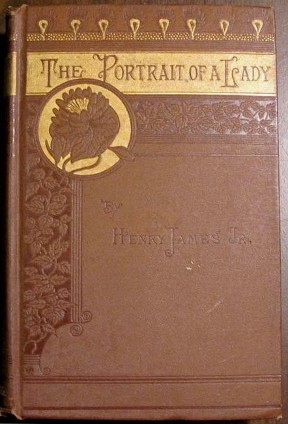
- First edition (US)
- Author: Henry James
- Language: English
- Genre: Novel, tragedy
- Publisher: Houghton, Mifflin and Company, Boston; Macmillan and Co., London
- Publication date: 29 October 1881 (Houghton); 16 November 1881 (Macmillan)
- Publication place: United Kingdom; United States
- Media type: Print (hardback and paperback)
- Pages: Houghton: 520; Macmillan: volume one, 266; volume two, 253; volume three, 248
- Preceded by: Washington Square
- Followed by: The Bostonians
- Text: The Portrait of a Lady at Wikisource

The Portrait of a Lady is a novel by Henry James, first published as a serial in The Atlantic Monthly and Macmillan's Magazine in 1880–81 and then as a book in 1881. It is one of James's most popular novels and is regarded by critics as one of his finest.

The Portrait of a Lady is the story of a spirited young American woman, Isabel Archer, who, "affronting her destiny," finds it overwhelming. She inherits a large amount of money and subsequently becomes the victim of Machiavellian scheming by two American expatriates. Like many of James's novels, it is set in Europe, mostly England and Italy. Generally regarded as the masterpiece of James's early period, this novel reflects James's continuing interest in the differences between the New World and the Old, often to the detriment of the former. It also treats in a profound way the themes of personal freedom, responsibility, and betrayal.

== Plot summary ==
Twenty-three year old Isabel Archer, from Albany, New York, is invited by her maternal aunt, Lydia Touchett, to visit Lydia's rich husband, Daniel, at his estate near London, following the death of Isabel's father. There, Isabel meets her uncle, her friendly invalid cousin Ralph Touchett, and the Touchetts' robust neighbor, Lord Warburton.

Isabel later declines Warburton's sudden proposal of marriage. She also rejects the hand of Caspar Goodwood, the charismatic son and heir of a wealthy Boston mill owner. Although Isabel is drawn to Caspar, her commitment to her independence precludes such a marriage, which she feels would demand the sacrifice of her freedom.

The elder Touchett grows ill and, at the request of his son, Ralph, leaves much of his estate to Isabel upon his death. With her large legacy, Isabel travels the Continent and meets an American expatriate, Gilbert Osmond, in Florence. Although Isabel had previously rejected both Warburton and Goodwood, she accepts Osmond's proposal of marriage, unaware that it has been actively promoted by the accomplished but untrustworthy Madame Merle, another American expatriate, whom Isabel had met at the Touchetts' estate.

Isabel and Osmond settle in Rome, but their marriage rapidly sours, owing to Osmond's overwhelming egotism and lack of genuine affection for his wife. Isabel grows fond of Pansy, Osmond's presumed daughter by his first marriage, and wants to support her wish to marry Edward Rosier, a young art collector.

The snobbish Osmond would prefer that Pansy accept the proposal of Warburton, who had previously proposed to Isabel. Isabel suspects, however, that Warburton may just be feigning interest in Pansy to get close to Isabel again, and the conflict creates even more strain within the unhappy marriage after Osmond demands that Isabel should leverage her supposed influence over Warburton to bring about his marriage to Pansy.

Isabel then learns that Ralph is dying at his estate in England and prepares to go to him for his final hours, but Osmond selfishly opposes this plan, threatening revenge if she proceeds against his disapproval. After this dispute, Isabel learns from her sister-in-law that Pansy is actually the daughter of Madame Merle, who has had an adulterous relationship with Osmond for several years.

Isabel pays a final visit to Pansy, who was sent to a convent by Osmond as an implicit demonstration of his authority vis-à-vis his wife, and their meeting terminates with Pansy begging her to return some day, which Isabel reluctantly promises to do. A meeting with Madame Merle, who too had been visiting Pansy at the same hour, confirms Isabel's suspicions of her relations to Osmond and Pansy. She then leaves, without telling her spiteful husband, to comfort the dying Ralph in England, where she remains until his death. While previously she had concealed the unhappiness of her marriage with Osmond to Ralph, Isabel discloses it to him on his deathbed. Ralph grieves that in delivering his father's fortune to his cousin, he has ruined her, but urges that she may still, as she is yet young, regain the freedom that she had relinquished in marrying.

Goodwood encounters her at Ralph's estate and begs her to leave Osmond and come away with him. He passionately embraces and kisses her, but Isabel flees. Goodwood seeks her out the next day but is told she has set off again for Rome.

The ending is ambiguous, and the reader is left to imagine whether Isabel will return to Osmond to endure her marriage in noble forbearance (perhaps for Pansy's sake), or instead rescue Pansy and leave Osmond.

== Major themes ==
James's first idea for The Portrait of a Lady was simple: a young American woman "affronting her destiny," whatever it might be. Only then did he begin to form a plot to bring out the character of his central figure. This was the uncompromising story of the free-spirited Isabel losing her freedom—despite (or because of) suddenly coming into a great deal of money—and getting "ground in the very mill of the conventional."

== Literary significance and criticism ==
The Portrait of a Lady has received critical acclaim since its first publication in The Atlantic Monthly, and it remains the most popular of James's longer fictions. Contemporary critics recognise that James had pushed the analysis of human consciousness and motivation to new levels, particularly in such passages as Chapter 42, where Isabel meditates deep into the night about her marriage and the trap she seems to have fallen into. James gave an in-depth account of Isabel's deepest terrors in his preface to the novel's 1908 New York Edition.

More recent criticism has been levelled by feminists. In particular, Isabel's final return to Osmond has fascinated critics, who have debated whether James sufficiently justifies this seemingly paradoxical rejection of freedom. One interpretation is that Isabel feels as honour-bound to the promise she has made to stepdaughter Pansy as she does to her marriage, and that she believes the scene her "unacceptable" trip to England will create with Osmond will leave her in a more justifiable position to abandon her marriage.

The extensive revisions James made for the 1908 New York Edition generally have been accepted as improvements, unlike the changes he made to other texts, such as The American or Roderick Hudson. The revision of the final scene between Isabel and Goodwood has been especially applauded. Edward Wagenknecht wrote that James "makes it as clear as any modern novelist could make it by using all the four-letter words in the dictionary that [Isabel] has been roused as never before in her life, roused in the true sense perhaps for the first time in her life." James's verbal magic allowed him to both obey and evade the restrictive conventions of his day for the treatment of sexuality in literature.

Critic Alfred Habegger has written that the main character of Portrait was inspired by Christie Archer, the protagonist of Anne Moncure Crane's novel Reginald Archer (1871). Crane may have influenced James, who Habegger believes was interested in Crane's female characters.

In the preface to the 1908 New York Edition, James referred to several of George Eliot's female protagonists as possible influences. Habegger questions this and quotes others doing the same.

In another critical article, "Rewriting Misogyny: The Portrait of a Lady and the Popular Fiction Debate", Paul M. Hadella mentions the similarities to Crane.

== Adaptations for stage and screen ==
In 1884, when the actor Lawrence Barrett wanted James to turn the novel into a play, James replied that he did not think it could be done. In his opinion, given in the preface to the New York Edition, the best scene in the book consists of Isabel sitting motionless in a chair.

The story was adapted as a Broadway play by William Archibald, which opened in December 1954, with Barbara O'Neil in the role of Madame Serena Merle.

In 1968 the BBC produced a television miniseries of The Portrait of a Lady starring Suzanne Neve as Isabel and Richard Chamberlain as Ralph Touchett.

The Portrait of a Lady was adapted in 1996 by New Zealand director Jane Campion into a film starring Nicole Kidman as Isabel, John Malkovich as Osmond, and Barbara Hershey as Madame Merle.

It was also adapted into the Urdu language in 1976 for a Pakistani television drama Parchaiyan. It was translated into Urdu by Haseena Moin and the central characters were played by Rahat Kazmi, Sahira Kazmi, Talat Hussain and Shakeel.

In July 2026, an upcoming series adaptation was announced by BBC and PBS, with Rebecca Lenkiewicz adapting the novel and Aisling Walsh serving as director. It stars Nell Tiger Free, Gemma Arterton, Jim Sturgess, Bill Nighy and Miranda Richardson as Isabel Archer, Madame Merle, Gilbert Osmond, Mr. Touchett and Mrs. Touchett respectively.

== Editions ==
- James, Henry. The Portrait of a Lady. Mifflin and co., 1881
- James, Henry. The Portrait of a Lady. Mifflin and co., 1882
- James, Henry. The Portrait of a Lady. Vol.2, 1908
- James, Henry. The Portrait of a Lady, 1910
- James, Henry. The Portrait of a Lady, Macmillan and co., 1921
- James, Henry. The Portrait of a Lady. Oxford: World's Classics, 1981 (ed. Nicola Bradbury), ISBN 978-0192815149
- James, Henry. The Portrait of a Lady. Bantam Classics, 1983
- James, Henry. The Portrait of a Lady, Penguin Classics, 1984
- James, Henry. The Portrait of a Lady. Bantam Books, 1987
- James, Henry. The Portrait of a Lady, Knopf, 1991
- James, Henry. A Norton critical edition The Portrait of a Lady, Norton and co., 1995
- James, Henry. The Portrait of a Lady. Wordsworth Editions Ltd, 1997
- James, Henry. The Portrait of a Lady, Penguin Classics, 2003
- James, Henry. The Portrait of a Lady. New York: Oxford University Press, 2008.
- James, Henry. The Portrait of a Lady. with illustrations, 2016
- James, Henry. The Portrait of a Lady. Macmillan Collector's Library, 2018

== Sources ==
- The Great Tradition by F. R. Leavis (London: Chatto and Windus 1948)
- The Novels of Henry James by Oscar Cargill (New York: Macmillan Co. 1961)
- The Novels of Henry James by Edward Wagenknecht (New York: Frederick Ungar Publishing Co. 1983) ISBN 0-8044-2959-6
- Modern Critical Views: Henry James edited by Harold Bloom (New York: Chelsea House Publishers 1987) ISBN 0-87754-696-7
- The Portrait of a Lady: Maiden, Woman and Heroine by Lyall Powers (Boston: Twayne Publishers 1991) ISBN 0-8057-8066-1
- Meaning in Henry James by Millicent Bell (Cambridge, MA: Harvard University Press 1991) ISBN 0-674-55763-8
- A Companion to Henry James Studies edited by Daniel Fogel (Westport, CT: Greenwood Press 1993) ISBN 0-313-25792-2
- Henry James: A Collection of Critical Essays edited by Ruth Yeazell (Englewood Cliffs, NJ: Prentice Hall 1994) ISBN 0-13-380973-0
- The Cambridge Companion to Henry James edited by Jonathan Freedman (Cambridge, UK: Cambridge University Press 1998) ISBN 0-521-49924-0
- Portrait of a Novel: Henry James and the Making of an American Masterpiece by Michael Gorra (Norton 2012) ISBN 0-8714-0408-7
- Funston, Judith E. "Crane, Anne Moncure." American National Biography Online, Feb 2000
- Bamberg, Robert (2003). The Portrait of a Lady: An Authoritative Text, Henry James and the Novel, Reviews and Criticism. New York: W.W. Norton & Company. ISBN 0-393-96646-1.
- James, Henry. The Portrait of a Lady. New York: Oxford University Press, 2009.
- Lamm, Kimberly. "A Future for Isabel Archer: Jamesian Feminism, Leo Bersani, and Aesthetic Subjectivity". The Henry James Review. Project Muse. Volume 32, 2011. 4 February 2013.
- Jöttkandt, Sigi. "Portrait of an Act: Aesthetics and Ethics in The Portrait of a Lady". The Henry James Review. Volume 25.1, 2004.67–86. 4 February 2013.

== See also ==
- Mrs Osmond, a 2017 novel by John Banville that continues the story of The Portrait of a Lady
