= Mrs. Medwin =

- Short story by Henry James
- Country: United Kingdom
- Language: English
- Genre: Short story

Publication
- Publication type: Periodical
- Publisher: Punch
- Media type: Print (Magazine)
- Publication date: August 28—September 18, 1901
- Pages: 8 pp

"Mrs. Medwin" is a short story by Henry James, first published in Punch in 1900. The story slyly satirizes fashionable society in fin-de-siècle England. The central characters are an American brother and sister who both entertain and live off this society, which has grown bland and bored and almost exhausted.

== Plot summary ==
Mamie Cutter is an American living in London. She supports herself by getting questionable people into fashionable social circles, in return for a fee. Her worthless but personable half-brother Scott Homer turns up at her apartment looking for a handout.

A particularly tough case for Mamie is a certain Mrs. Medwin, who is apparently beyond the pale even by the lax standards of current English society. But Scott comes to Mamie's rescue by charming the snooty Lady Wantrigde into inviting Mrs. Medwin to one of her exclusive parties. Mamie collects her fee and Scott becomes an unexpected social success.

== Major themes ==
In his Notebooks James bestowed the adjective "cynical" on his idea for this story, and it's hard to disagree. Never did James describe English high society with a more sarcastic tone than in this worldly-wise tale of how jaded socialites will accept anything and anybody for the sake of an even slightly fresh experience.

Scott Homer puts it in his usual blunt way: "The bigger bugs they are the more they're on the lookout...for anything that will help them to live...They're dead, don't you see? And WE'RE alive." James endows Scott with enough charm to make his success with the "bugs" believable, and Mamie doesn't mind collecting the financial rewards. The story's brevity (under eight thousand words) and simplicity of style help keep its sardonic message from seeming clumsy or forced. The satirical magazine Punch was a perfect vehicle for this astringent view of hoity-toity social circles.

== Critical evaluation ==
Critics such as Clifton Fadiman, Edward Wagenknecht and Robert Gale have been quite kind to this "little cynical comedy", as its author dubbed it. James handles his material with the lightest touch, never blundering into a ham-handed condemnation of social hypocrisy. Abundant humor makes it clear that James is unshockable and amused.

The idea for the tale came from a few bits of gossip, and the finished product shows how the thoroughly experienced novelist could turn the smallest hint into a minor masterpiece. Keeping the story as brief as possible for commercial and artistic reasons, James still gets his characters into sharp outline and makes his satire memorable.
