= Michael Anesko =

US literary critic, writer and professor

- Born: State College, Pennsylvania, U.S.
- Occupations: Literary critic Writer

Academic background
- Education: Penn State University

Michael Anesko is a U.S. literary critic, writer and professor. He is perhaps best known for his studies of 19th-century American novelists, in particular, Henry James and William Dean Howells. He is currently a professor of English at Pennsylvania State University and previously served as faculty advisor for the department's undergraduate honors program. He lives in State College, Pennsylvania, where he was born, and also in Cambridge, Massachusetts.

Educated at Penn State and Harvard, Anesko published in 1986 a study of the economic factors that shaped Henry James's literary career. Titled "Friction with the Market": Henry James and the Profession of Authorship, the book argued against the image of James as a mandarin artist who ignored the dictates of the marketplace. Anesko showed how James actively sought the best prices for his works, used literary agents extensively, and was not afraid to pit one publisher against another. The book also calculated James's income from his writings for each year of his career, and explored how James constructed the New York Edition (1907–1909) of his works.

In 1997 Anesko published a selected edition of the correspondence between James and his friend and editor, William Dean Howells. The collection, Letters, Fictions, Lives: Henry James and William Dean Howells showed how the two writers' careers developed from their earliest days to eventual prominence in their profession. Again, the focus was on the interaction between professional demands and artistic development.

Anesko’s next project, The French Face of Nathaniel Hawthorne: Monsieur de l’Aubépine and His Second Empire Critics (Ohio State, 2011), was a collaborative effort, featuring six essays originally published in French periodicals during Hawthorne’s lifetime and never before translated into English. The discovery that Henry James plagiarized some of them in his 1879 biographical study, Hawthorne, made this work even more compelling.

The following year, Anesko published Monopolizing the Master: Henry James and the Politics of Modern Literary Scholarship (Stanford, 2012), a ground-breaking historical analysis of the attempts of others to shape and control Henry James’s posthumous reputation and cultural capital.

Anesko is one of four general editors of the first scholarly edition of James’s work—The Complete Fiction of Henry James, being published by Cambridge University Press. His particular contribution to the series, The Portrait of a Lady, appeared in 2016. Anesko’s extensive editorial experience with this and another of James’s major titles (The Ambassadors) allowed him to complete another book, Generous Mistakes: Incidents of Error in Henry James (Oxford, 2017).

Asked to curate a centennial exhibition at Harvard's Houghton Library in 2016 (marking the 100th anniversary of Henry James's death), Anesko discovered new material that inspired his next book, Henry James and Queer Filiation: Hardened Bachelors of the Edwardian Era (Palgrave/Macmillan, 2018). His latest project, James Framed: Material Representations of the Master, the first in-depth analysis of all the incarnations of James in the visual and plastic arts (commissioned during the author's lifetime), will be published by the University of Nebraska Press in 2022.

In 2014 Anesko also became co-editor of The Complete Letters of Henry James, an on-going project of the University of Nebraska Press.

Besides these books Anesko has contributed many articles to journals and anthologies on American literature, especially the 19th century realists. He is a past president of the Henry James Society (publisher of the Henry James Review). His research interests include the history of book publishing, authorship as a profession, and sociological aspects of literature.

== Bibliography ==
- "Friction with the Market" : Henry James and the Profession of Authorship by Michael Anesko, Oxford University Press 1986 ISBN 0-19-504034-1
- Letters, Fictions, Lives : Henry James and William Dean Howells by Michael Anesko, Oxford University Press 1997 ISBN 0-19-506119-5
- The French Face of Nathaniel Hawthorne: Monsieur de l’Aubépine and His Second Empire Critics by Michael Anesko and N. Christine Brooks, Ohio State University Press 2011 ISBN 0-81-421143-7
- Monopolizing the Master: Henry James and the Politics of Modern Literary Scholarship by Michael Anesko, Stanford University Press 2012 ISBN 0-80-476932-X
- The Portrait of a Lady edited by Michael Anesko, Cambridge University Press 2016 ISBN 1-10-700400-4
- Generous Mistakes: Incidents of Error in Henry James by Michael Anesko, Oxford University Press 2017 ISBN 0-19-879488-6
