= Todorov's narrative theory of equilibrium =

Literary theory of narrative structure

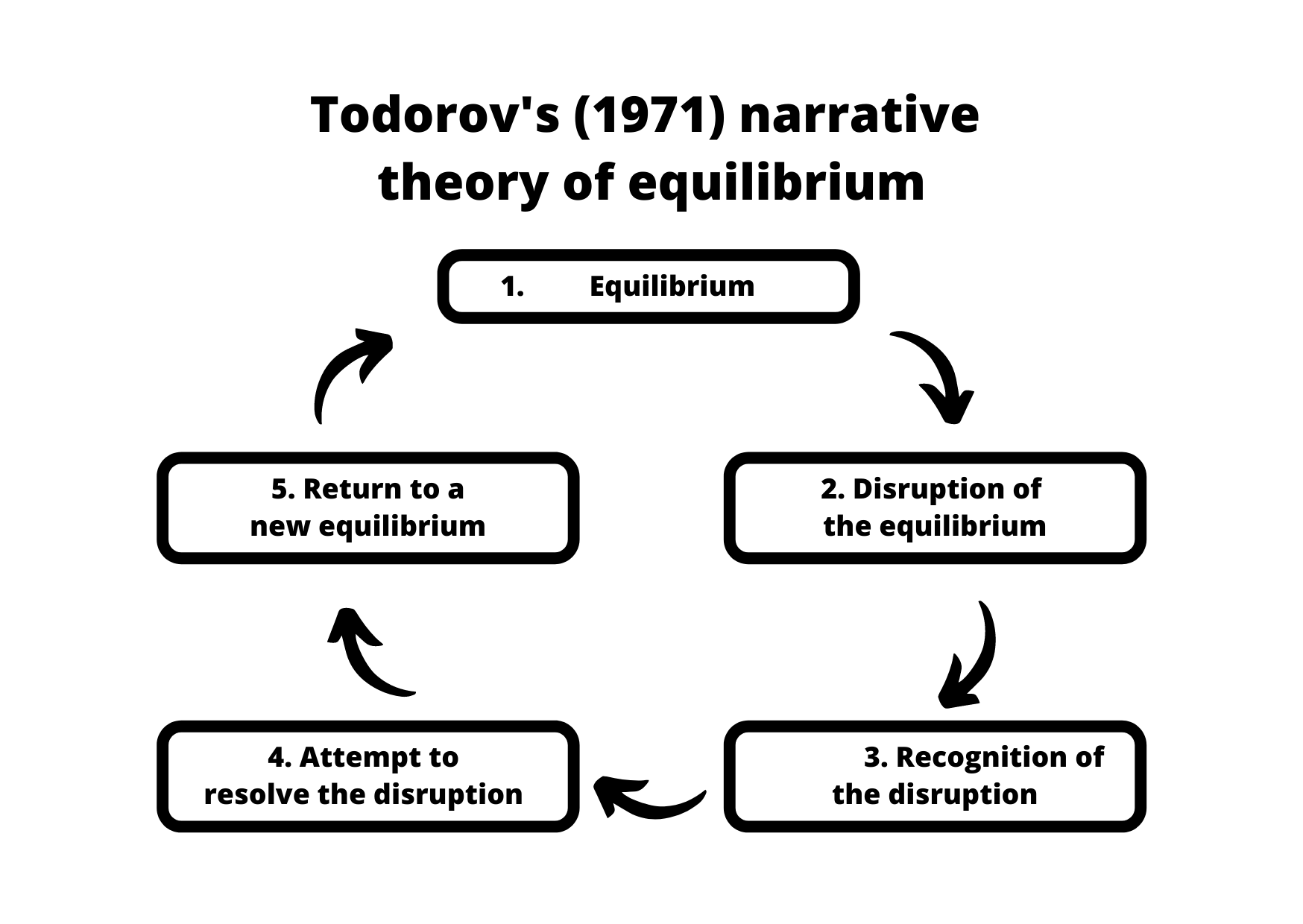
An infographic summarising Tzvetan Todorov's narrative theory of equilibrium.

The narrative theory of equilibrium was proposed by Bulgarian narratologist Tzvetan Todorov in 1971. Todorov delineated this theory in an essay entitled The Two Principles of Narrative. The essay claims that all narratives contain the same five formal elements: equilibrium, disruption, recognition, resolution, and new equilibrium.

== Narratology ==
The narrative theory of equilibrium derives from narratology. This discipline examines story construction and its effect on human consciousness. Narratology perceives stories as sense-making mechanisms, which allow citizens to understand history, morality, and contemporary social structures. Narratives appear in artistic media, like novels and films, and discursive exchanges between citizens. They often reflect societal values and are thus capable of influencing individual identity formation.

Todorov’s conception of narrative references Russian formalism. This mode of literary criticism construes narrative as a series of events, which should be analysed independently of their progenitorial medium. It was pioneered throughout the 1920s by Vladimir Propp. Propp identified 31 narrative elements repeated throughout European folktales. This formalistic practice inspired Todorov’s narratological pursuits.

The narrative model also borrows from French structuralism. Structuralism inspects narrative’s properties, functions and formal elements. Claude Levi-Strauss assessed narrative grammar in anthropological circles. Roland Barthes, Todorov’s professor at L’Ecole des Hautes Etudes en Sciences Sociales, combined structuralism with semiotics. In works such as 1957’s Mythologies, Barthes appraised the sign systems that ascribe meaning to popular culture.

== Structural Analysis of Narrative (1969) ==
Todorov’s Structural Analysis of Narrative anticipated his equilibratory model. Citing Boccaccio’s The Decameron, this essay espouses a structural analysis of plot. Boccaccio’s narratives move from one state of equilibrium, or ecological balance, to another. This plot type comprises “the imaginary universe of [a] book”, Todorov argues, wherein culture, nature, society and subjectivity intersect. Structural analysis acknowledges these factors, which indicate the social norms and literary conventions that influenced The Decameron’s publication.

== Description ==
The Two Principles of Narrative (1971) extends Todorov’s structural analysis of Boccaccio. Todorov posited that all narratives contain equilibrium, disequilibrium, recognition, resolution, and new equilibrium. "Logical and artistic necessity" mandates these formal similarities. Narrative, Todorov suggests, is a language that humans are conditioned to speak. This communicative device marries description with temporal transformation. Audiences cannot recognise a narrative unless it contains the sequential developments that typify the genre.

Todorov uses The Swan-geese to clarify these developments. The Swan-geese, a traditional Russian fairy-tale, invokes narrative conventions to promote empathy and obedience amongst children. These conventions include:

1. Equilibrium

The Swan-geese commences in a state of normality. Readers are familiarised with setting and character, as they observe a peasant girl's everyday life. The protagonist is entrusted with the care of her infant brother, but prioritises playing outdoors above familial obligation.

2. Disruption

An unforeseen event disturbs this equilibrium. Villainous birds abduct a baby in The Swan-geese’s inciting incident. Chronology is upheld, as his sister’s abdication of responsibility makes the kidnapping possible.

3. Recognition

The narrative acknowledges the aforementioned disruption. The Swan-geese’s heroine, an audience surrogate, embodies this recognition. When the girl returns from the woods, she and the audience discover that her brother is missing.

4. Resolution

A character, driven by the psychological need for uncertainty resolution, aims to restore equilibrium. The Swan-geese’s protagonist endeavours to rescue her brother from the Baba Yaga who ordered his capture. She encounters numerous challenges in a quest that strengthens her moral fibre.

5. New equilibrium

The character and plot development culminate in a new equilibrium. The Swan-geese’s antagonists are defeated; the girl and her brother return home. The conclusion sates a desire for resolution, whilst reaffirming the tale’s morality.

Todorov states that The Decameron, Arthurian legend, Les Liaisons dangereuses, and Henry James’s In the Cage also exemplify the narrative model.

== Examples ==
- The narrative structure of Chuck Palahniuk’s 1996 novel, Fight Club, utilises elements of Todorov’s narrative theory. The text begins with equilibrium and descends into disequilibrium as it progresses.
- 1Q84, a Japanese novel written by Haruki Murakami, employs the narrative theories of Todorov, Gerard Genette, Shlomith Rimmon-Kenan and William Nelles. Its paradoxical discussion of narrative strategies and structures creates a “complex novel world”.
- One Thousand and One Nights, a compilation of Middle Eastern folktales, reflects Todorov’s notion that “narrating equals living”. It does so by presenting the “therapeutic value of storytelling” as a motivation for equilibrium.

== Criticisms ==
While Todorov’s theory has gained widespread acceptance, theorists have noted several limitations.

Yoseph Taum discusses Todorov’s narrative theory in relation to Panji stories, a UNESCO-recognised cycle of Javanese legends. He finds that, while Todorov’s five narrative units accommodate Panji stories superficially, it struggles to explain cultural particularities and the transformation from physical reality to spiritual reality. Keanu Adepati also challenges the universality of Todorov’s theory, noting that the model is not applicable to every story.

James Phelan observes that it is difficult to expand the theory’s scope beyond literary narrative and the paradigm of literary history. Regardless, he posits that narrative theory should be more central to the study of the humanities as a way of organising knowledge. Phelan deems it important to distinguish between narrative and other representations, including those of cultural artifacts.

Raphael Baroni argues that narrative theory’s excess formalism is a “toolbox” for literary study. Baroni accuses Todorov of confining commentary to an objective overview of narrative structure, instead of analysing functions, meanings and sociohistorical contexts. He concludes that narrative theory falls short of discussing the ethical and immersive experiences of the narrated world.

== Further applications ==
Helder Prior’s The Political Scandal as Narrative Experience addresses the relationship between complex narratives that develop in the press and their presentation as ‘stories’. Helder inspects the media and narrativity, arguing that scandals acquire a narrative framework indebted to Todorov’s theory. This framework considers the textual organisation of events, including their fragmentation into major and minor episodes, the individualisation of character identification, and the construction of plot. Prior characterises the mass media as a narrative device, with narratology applicable to celebrity culture and its communication to the public. Elements of Todorov’s theory, like equilibrium and disequilibrium, are believed to align with real-life phenomena.

== See also ==
- Aarne-Thompson-Uther Index
- Binary opposition
- Comparative mythology
- French structuralism
- Hero’s journey
- Morphology
- Myth
- Narratology
- Russian formalism
- Semiotics
