= A Bundle of Letters =

- Short story by Henry James
- Country: France
- Language: English
- Genre: Short story

Publication
- Published in: The Parisian
- Publication type: Periodical
- Media type: Print (Magazine)
- Publication date: December 18, 1879
- Pages: 3 pp

"A Bundle of Letters" is a comic short story by Henry James, originally published in The Parisian magazine in 1879, which is also when the story takes place. The story is one of James' few ventures into epistolary fiction. As he did so often, especially in the early stages of his career, James made the tale part of his international theme: his letter-writers represent a number of different countries. Although some of the characters look like well-worn stereotypes — the wolfish Frenchman, the pedantic and aggressively nationalistic German, the snobbish upper-class English siblings — James manages to endow most of them with enough twists and turns of personality to interest the reader. One character has even been taken as a sly satire on himself.

== Plot summary ==
Several residents of a Paris boarding-house write letters to their friends and family back home; their primary subject is their reaction to each other. The main character is Miranda Hope, an angular but likeable Yankee Miss from Bangor, Maine who, quite bravely for a young woman of that era, is traveling in Europe alone. In her letters, she chatters to her mother about seeing the sights in Europe but doesn't like the Old World's treatment of its women, "and that is a point, you know, on which I feel very strongly." Her expressions of petulance with William Platt, who we realize must have been a suitor of hers back in Maine, are so offhand as to be amusing. Although she is in general the least affected and most sympathetic character in the story, her unawareness of the disdain in which most of the characters hold each other (including herself) makes her seem somewhat naive.

Meanwhile, society girl Violet Ray of New York writes to a friend that Miranda, who she sees as provincial, is "really too horrible." Another boarder, wannabe aesthete Louis Leverett (quite possibly a self-satire by James) gushes in his letter that "the great thing is to live, you know," amid much precious verbiage about the good, the true and the bee-a-u-tiful. An English boarder, Evelyn Vane, pens a scoffing note that Louis is always talking about the color of the sky, but she doubts if he's ever seen it except through a window-pane; and the German sees Leverett's "decadence" as further evidence that the English-speaking world is weak and ripe for takeover.

The Frenchman Leon Verdier almost drools in his letter about the charms of ces demoiselles among the boarders, and focuses primarily on their appearance. The rather threatening German professor is the only character both cynical and intelligent enough to realize how disdainful all the English speakers are of each other. However, he's also the least sympathetic character in the story. (James disliked Germany and its culture.) While the other characters despise each other mostly on personal grounds, or from cultural misunderstanding, Herr Professor despises them all based on their national traits and general sub-human status (he calls the Frenchman "simian"). In a letter to his German friend, he simultaneously brags of his erudition and predicts that the weakness of these other nationalities augurs a bright future "for the deep-lunged children of the Fatherland!"

== Major themes ==
In his New York Edition preface James says that he wrote this relaxed, very funny story in a single sitting: "an unusual straightness of labour." Not much about the story seems labored, though, as James brought a great deal of the wit and sparkle of his own letters to those of his imagined correspondents.

The story makes mostly light work of national differences, but the penultimate letter from Dr. Staub, the Deutschland-über-alles fanatic, sounds a jarring note of reality. James gives a final letter from Miranda to soften the harshness of Staub's rants—and the similar harshness of James' attitude towards Germany. But readers today can't help but remember how Staub's words would find terrible fulfillment in the bloody first half of the 20th century.

Finally, much of the humor in the piece comes from the characters' undercutting of each other's lies and pretensions, while none of them are aware that the others are writing about them. Only the reader really sees what's going on, which adds to the entertainment value of the piece.

== Critical evaluation ==
This story was pirated in an unauthorized version before James could get the legitimate book through the press, which proves how popular and salable it was. The humor is immediate and vivid, and few critics have resisted the charm of James' sharply drawn characters. This was perhaps the best way James could approach writing for the drama, a long-cherished dream of his. He could forget about stage business and just let his characters reveal themselves in letters.

Much critical talk has centered on the ranting German, Dr. Staub. Writing from a wartime point of view in 1945, Clifton Fadiman avowed that Staub showed how barbaric the German nation was. After four decades had allowed passions to cool, Edward Wagenknecht demurred that James' portrait of the doctrinaire pedant was jingoistic and unfair. Whatever the reader may make of these opinions, there's no question that Staub's letter is much different from the others and far more disturbing in its implications.
