= The Death of the Lion =

- Short story by Henry James
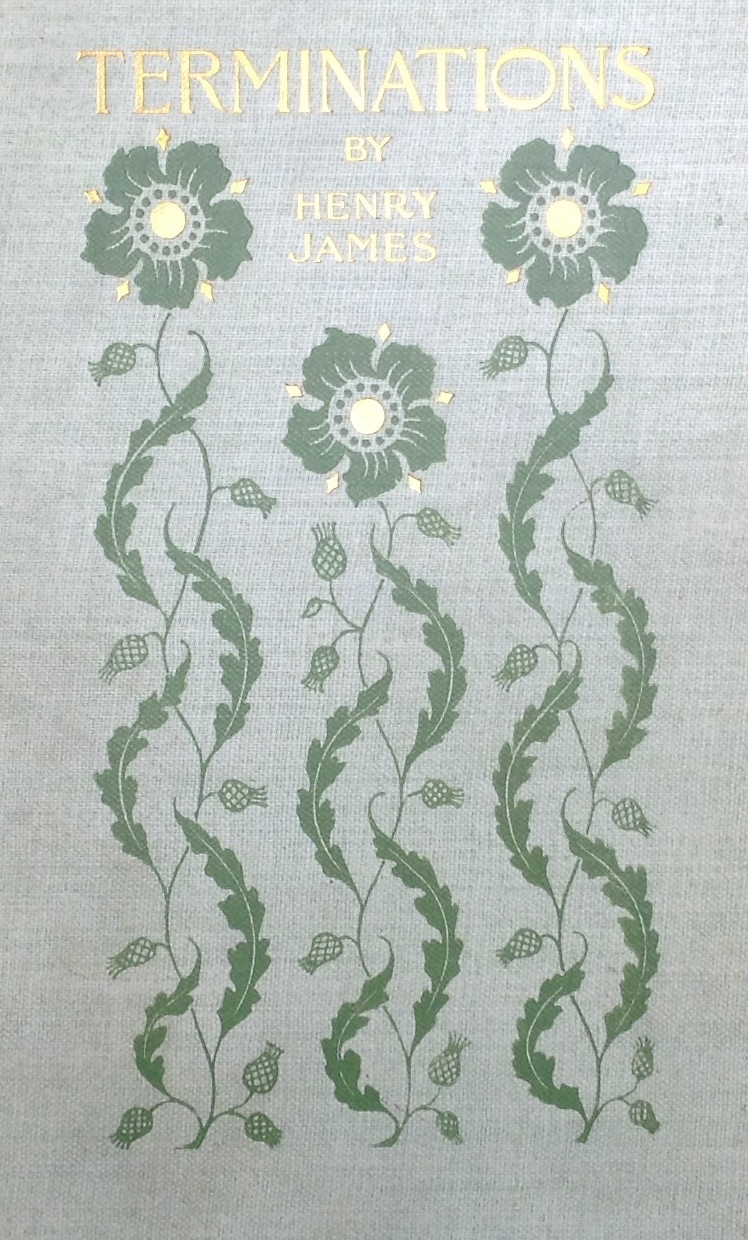
- Terminations, 1895, first U.S. edition of "The Death of the Lion"
- Country: United Kingdom
- Language: English
- Genre: Short story

Publication
- Published in: The Yellow Book
- Publication type: Periodical
- Publisher: William Heinemann; Harper & Brothers Publishers
- Media type: Print (Magazine)
- Publication date: 1894
- Pages: 55

"The Death of the Lion" is an 1894 short story by Henry James.

== Plot summary ==
The narrator suggests writing an article on Neil Paraday an author; his new editor agrees. The former spends a week with Neil and writes the article whilst there, alongside reading Paraday's latest book. His editor rejects the article however; he decides to write an article for another newspaper, but it goes unnoticed. Neil Paraday gets excited about writing another book, despite the fact that he doesn't seem successful still. However the narrator comes across a praiseful review in The Empire.

Mr Morrow, a journalist suddenly interested in writing about Neil Paraday's life now that he is successful, comes round and ends up scaring the writer; the narrator manages to see him off. He tells Mr Morrow all there is to know about Paraday is in his work; the journalist is not amused. Later, he publishes an article on Neil's house in the Tatler. Embracing his fame, Paraday takes to going to London luncheons with women.

The narrator meets Miss Hurter, an American admirer of the writer's, in his house. As the writer is again busy with Mrs Wimbush, he explains to the girl that the best thing she can do is not to bother Paraday and only admire him from afar, so as not to interfere with his writings. Nevertheless, he keeps her autograph album to show it to him. Later, he meets with her to read passages from Paraday; once while they are at the opera he points Paraday out to her.

The narrator is annoyed with Mrs Wimbush for inviting Paraday to a party at Prestidge. Subsequently, he quotes from a letter sent to Miss Hurter while he was at the party. In this mise en abyme, he describes the way the other guests have not read Paraday's works; worse still, Lady Augusta confesses to having mislaid the text is expected to read out the next day - there is no extra copy. Paraday falls gravely ill; the guests, enhanced by the Princess, are merry since the party seems to be a success. Dora Forbes joins them - later to become Mrs Wimbrush's next 'henpecked' writer. The party is called off on doctors order; the Princess lets him pass away in one of her houses. Before his death, Paraday had asked the narrator to publish an unfinished text by him. Although the one lost by Lady Augusta has not been found again, the narrator and Miss Hurter, who eventually marry, shall keep Paraday's memory alive through their dedication to his texts.

== Characters ==
- The unnamed narrator
- Mr Pinhorn, the narrator's new editor
- Mr Deedy, the narrator's former editor
- Mrs Deedy, Mr Deedy's wife
- Neil Paraday, a writer
- Mr Paraday's parlour-maid
- Mr Morrow, a name-dropping journalist
- Guy Walsingham, writer of Obsession (masculine pen name of Miss Collop)
- Dora Forbes, writer of The Other Way Round (feminine pen name of a male writer)
- Mrs Wimbush, an overbearing woman
- Miss Hurter, an American admirer of Paraday's
- Mrs Milsom, Miss Hurter's sister, who lives in Paris
- Mr Rumble, a young painter seeking fame
- The Princess
- The Duke
- Lady Augusta Minch, who loses a text by Paraday
- Lord Dorimont

== Origins and author's discussion ==
Henry James first discussed the idea for The Death of the Lion in a February 3, 1894 entry in his Notebooks. The subject was close to his personal experience, as he emphasized in the first lines of the notebook entry: "Could not something be done with the idea of the great (the distinguished, the celebrated) artist - man of letters he must, in the case, be - who is tremendously made up to, feted, written to for his autograph, portrait, etc., and yet with whose work, in this age of advertisement and newspaperism, this age of interviewing, not one of the persons concerned has the smallest acquaintance? It would have the merit, at least, of corresponding to an immense reality - a reality that strikes me every day of my life."

James goes on to imagine plot details that correspond closely to the finished story - "They must kill him" - and to sketch some of the characters who would later become the narrator, Mrs. Wimbush, Guy Walshingham and Dora Forbes. He emphasizes that the style of the story must be "admirably satiric, ironic" to avoid any hint of mawkishness or self-pity.

The story appeared in James' New York Edition. In his preface James recalled how happy he was that the editors of The Yellow Book, where The Death of the Lion was first published, allowed him to expand the tale beyond the rigid length limitations often imposed on short story writers. He then discusses the tale's plot, noting how society often cares little for the subjects of its fawning attention, even to the point of literally killing them with overdone consideration. In a wryly humorous note James says of the lion, Neil Paraday: "I yet had met him - though in a preserve not perhaps known in all its extent to geographers."

== Criticism ==
The Death of the Lion has enjoyed generally favorable criticism over the decades. Reviewers have admired the tale's sardonic, tartly comic view of literary "lionization" by unknowing and careless admirers, who may have only the slightest (if any) acquaintance with the lionized author's works. Frank Kermode, for instance, in his introduction to a Penguin collection which includes the story, appreciated James' "achievement of rendering a tragic donnée in the mode of irony and even, at moments, of farce."

The story clearly has autobiographical resonance, as James himself states in the Notebook entry. But the story's style eliminates any hint of self-pity, as Robert Gale pointed out: "James must have seen himself as lionizable; so the story has an autobiographical touch, although totally without self-pity and although James would never have submitted to social exploitation the way Paraday foolishly does...The story is saved from being sad not only by its pervasive ironic and comic tone, but also by its unique ending: two young people marry and pursue an impossible dream, symbolized by a sought-for but never-to-be-found literary treasure."
