= The Reverberator =

1888 novel by Henry James

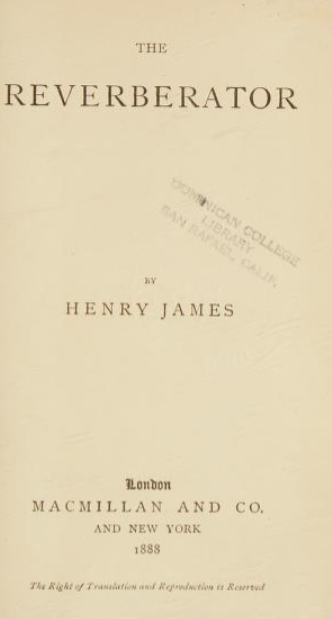
- Title page for The Reverberator (1888)
- Author: Henry James
- Language: English
- Genre: novel
- Publisher: Macmillan and Co., London, New York City
- Publication date: 5 June 1888
- Publication place: United Kingdom, United States
- Media type: Print (Hardback & Paperback)
- Pages: Volume one, 190; volume two, 207

The Reverberator is a short novel by Henry James, first published as a serial in Macmillan's Magazine in 1888, and then as a book later the same year. Described by a web authority on Henry James as "a delightful Parisian bonbon," the comedy traces the complications that result when nasty but true stories about a Paris family get into the American scandal sheet of the novel's title.

== Plot summary ==
George Flack is the Paris correspondent for an American scandal sheet called The Reverberator. Francie Dosson, a pretty but not always tactful American girl, confides to Flack some gossip about the Proberts, the Frenchified (but originally American) family of her fiancé, Gaston Probert.

Predictably, to everybody except Francie, the nasty gossip winds up in The Reverberator, much to the horror of the stuffy Proberts. Francie makes no attempt to hide her role in giving Flack the juicy details. Gaston is initially dismayed by his fiancée's indiscretions. But with the somewhat surprising support of his sister Suzanne, he decides to accept Francie, who never tries to shift the blame to Flack. Gaston stands up to the outraged members of his family and marries his fiancée.

== Key themes ==
James had no love for publicity himself, so he doesn't spare Francie's gaucherie in blabbing about the Proberts' dirty laundry. On the other hand, he doesn't mind drubbing the stick-necked snobbery of many members of the Probert family. In the last analysis, James clearly sides with his heroine and grants her a happy ending.

Flack, the archetypical newspaperman who can't wait to splatter the latest gossip in newsprint, comes in for a predictable trashing by James. "For the convenience of society" in identifying Flack, says James, "he ought always to have worn something conspicuous is a green hat or a yellow necktie." Francie has divided critics somewhat. She's honest and appealing, but also naive to a fault. Gaston wavers and hesitates like many a Jamesian male, but he eventually does the right thing.

== Critical evaluation ==
Even the ever-critical William James liked his younger brother's work in this "Parisian bonbon." Almost everybody concedes the novel's charm, but some have demurred at the slightness of the material. Of course, after the critical failure of The Bostonians and The Princess Casamassima, James might have been gun-shy about weightier topics.

In the New York Edition preface, James calls the novel a jeu d’esprit and "so slight a composition." But he then launches into a long, dense discussion of the structure, origins and characters of the book.

== Stage adaptation ==
In 1952, the British writer Dodie Smith adapted the novel into a play Letter from Paris, which ran for 27 performances at London's Aldwych Theatre.
