= The Awkward Age =

1899 novel by Henry James

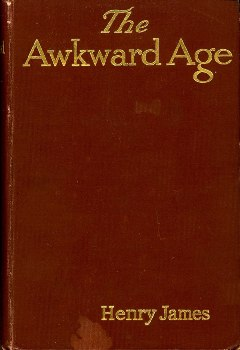
- First US edition
- Author: Henry James
- Language: English
- Publisher: William Heinemann, London; Harpers Brothers Publishers, New York City
- Publication date: Heinemann: 29 April 1899; Harpers: 22 May 1899
- Publication place: United Kingdom, United States
- Media type: Print (Serial)
- Pages: Heinemann: 414; Harpers: 457

The Awkward Age is a novel by Henry James, first published as a serial in Harper's Weekly in 1898–1899 and then as a book later in 1899. Originally conceived as a brief, light story about the complications created in her family's social set by a young girl coming of age, the novel expanded into a general treatment of decadence and corruption in English fin de siècle life.

== Synopsis ==
Mr. and Mrs. Edward Brookenham host an effete, rather corrupt social circle. They are the parents of worthless Harold and sweet but knowledgeable Nanda (age 18). Mr. Longdon attends one of their social functions and is amazed at how much Nanda resembles her grandmother, his long-ago love who married another man. Vanderbank, a young civil servant with little money, admires both Mrs. Brookenham (nicknamed "Mrs. Brook") and Nanda. Mrs. Brook seems to want an affair with "Van" but he appears more interested in Nanda. Mr. Longdon promises him a dowry if he marries Nanda.

Mrs. Brook is instead trying to get her daughter married to Mitchy, a very rich but rather naive member of her social circle. But Nanda urges Mitchy to marry Aggie, the supposedly sheltered step-niece of one of Mrs. Brook's friends (the Duchess). Mitchy follows the advice, then watches helplessly as Aggie kicks over the traces and starts playing around on him. Van constantly hesitates about proposing to Nanda. She finally tells him and Mitchy to be kind to her mother, then prepares to stay at Mr. Longdon's country home as a kind of surrogate daughter.

== Key themes ==
James originally wanted this novel to resemble one of Gyp's superficial but entertaining novels of social decadence. But the material drew him on, and he wound up with a lengthy book about Nanda's eventual rejection of the often sleazy social circle around her mother. A lot of the characters who drop by Mrs. Brook's house are certainly no saints, and hypocrisy and deceit seem to be their favorite pastimes.

Mr. Longdon represents an idealized previous age of better morals and manners. He wants to see Nanda safely married and away from what he views as her mother's corrupting influence. Although the book ends with Nanda preparing to stay at his country house, there are no guarantees as to how her future will play out.

With the novel cast almost entirely in dialogue, it's sometimes difficult for the reader to detect the characters' genuine motives. But there's little doubt James meant the book as an attack on what he saw as the increasing irresponsibility and immorality of the society around him. James was always careful to sweeten this rather dour message with a lot of witty satire on the foibles of Mrs. Brook's social circle. He was particularly proud of his treatment of the resourceful if not overly honest Mrs. Brook herself.

Many critics see the novel as parallel in theme and setting to James's earlier novel What Maisie Knew, with Nanda as a slightly older version of Maisie.

== Critical evaluation ==
Critics have strongly disagreed on the worth of The Awkward Age. F.R. Leavis praised it highly, calling it "one of James' major achievements." Edmund Wilson, on the other hand, showed little patience with the "gibbering crew" surrounding Nanda with their vaguely corrupt schemes. More recent commentators have expressed similar differences.

Many critics, such as Edward Wagenknecht, have detected over-treatment in the almost-all-dialogue presentation, which often strings out scenes to great length and complexity. James rejected this criticism emphatically in the New York Edition preface.
