= The Great Good Place =

The Great Good Place may refer to:

- The Great Good Place (book), 1989 book by Ray Oldenburg
- "The Great Good Place" (short story), 1900 short story by Henry James
