= The Middle Years =

- Short story by Henry James
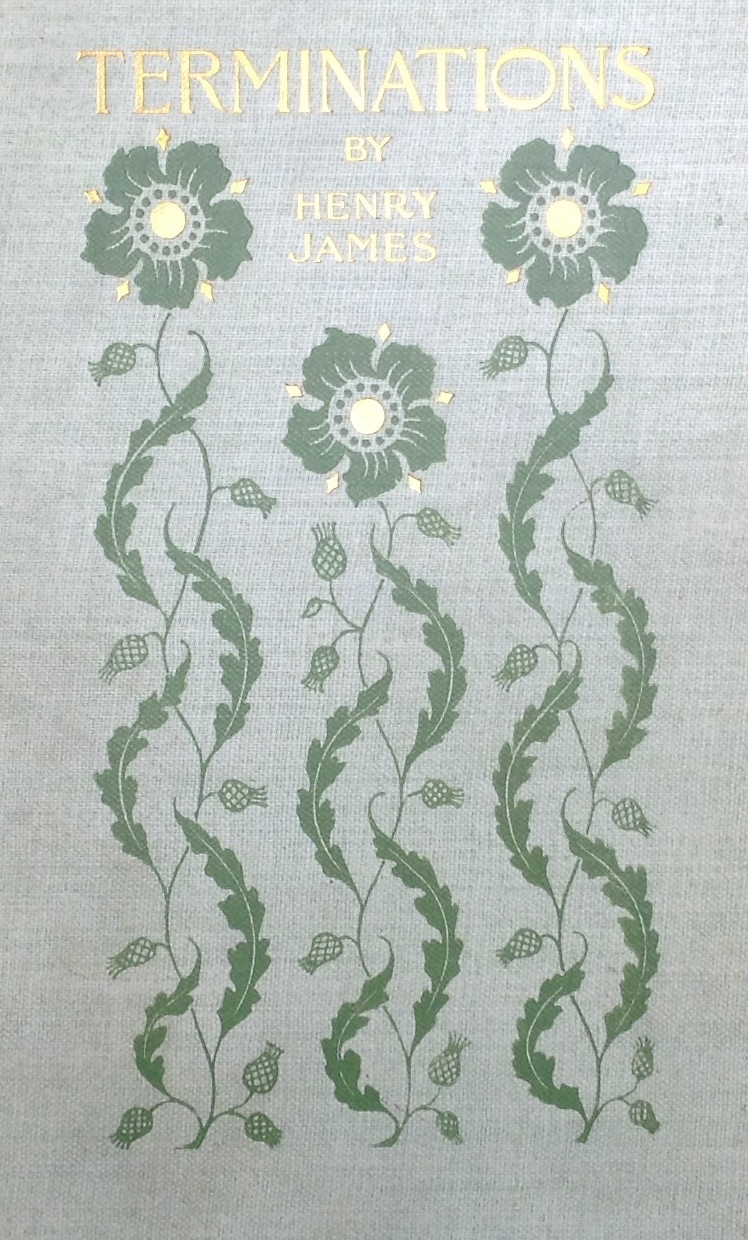
- Terminations, 1895, first U.S. edition of "The Middle Years"
- Country: United States
- Genre: Short story

Publication
- Published in: Scribner's Magazine
- Publication type: Periodical
- Publisher: Charles Scribner's Sons
- Media type: Print (Magazine)
- Publication date: May 1893
- Pages: 11

"The Middle Years" is a short story by Henry James, first published in Scribner's Magazine in 1893. The novelist in the tale speculates that he has spent his whole life learning how to write, so a second life would make sense, "to apply the lesson." Second lives are not usually available, so the novelist says of himself and his fellow artists: "We work in the dark—we do what we can—we give what we have. Our doubt is our passion and our passion is our task. The rest is the madness of art."

== Plot summary ==
Dencombe, a novelist who has been seriously ill, is convalescing at the English seaside town of Bournemouth. He is sitting near the water and reading his latest book entitled The Middle Years. A young physician named Dr. Hugh comes over to Dencombe and begins to talk about his admiration for the novel, though he does not realize that he's speaking to the book's author.

The weakened Dencombe suddenly loses consciousness. When he revives, he finds that Dr. Hugh has recognized him, and that the physician is also attending a wealthy woman referred to only as the Countess. Over the next few days Dr. Hugh pays more attention to Dencombe than to the Countess, and he is warned about this by the wealthy woman's companion, Miss Vernham.

A few days later Dencombe relapses. Dr. Hugh tells Dencombe that the Countess has died and left him nothing in her will. Close to death Dencombe whispers to Dr. Hugh the eloquent words quoted above. The tale's final sentence tells how Dencombe's first and only chance at life and art has ended.

== Major themes ==
Many of James's stories about writers show some evidence, usually smothered in ironic humor, of resentment that his own fiction did not reach a much larger audience. "The Middle Years" is free from such rather querulous regrets. Instead, the tale shows the artist's quest as something far more important than a search for popularity and material rewards.

The plot is so simple that it almost seems an afterthought. Dr. Hugh's devotion is genuine and touching, but it serves mainly to inspire Dencombe to his sad, wise reflections on a lifetime of artistic effort. Dencombe never will enjoy "an extension" of his life, "another go" at his art. But he comes to realize that his life's work is already enough for him to "possess his kingdom" and to die with a genuine sense of having achieved all he could.

== Critical evaluation ==
Many critics have noted how "The Middle Years" differs from James's other tales of writers and their troubles. As Frank Kermode said: "'The Middle Years' stands somewhat apart from the other stories of the literary life; the tone is darker, the ironies less vivid, the relationship between old and young more intimate and more understanding." This gentler approach, free from bitterness about James's own problems as an artist, has attracted sometimes hyperbolic praise. Edward Wagenknecht, for instance, called it "by all means the most beautiful" of James' stories about writers, and said the tale made him want to cry rather than lecture.

In his own New York Edition preface to the story, James expressed pride at compressing his material into the short length magazine editors often demanded. The mature and unobtrusive technique of the tale masks the complexity of its treatment of the artist, doomed and triumphant, tragic and victorious.

== Influence ==
Philip Roth in his 1979 work The Ghost Writer references and quotes from "The Middle Years" extensively with long sections being quoted verbatim. A part of the theme of The Ghost Writer can be seen as a homage to "The Middle Years" with Nathan Zuckerman and E.I Lonoff representing Dr. Hugh and Dencombe respectively.
