= The Great Good Place (short story) =

- Short story by Henry James
- Country: United States
- Language: English
- Genre: Short story

Publication
- Published in: Scribner's Magazine
- Publication type: Periodical
- Publisher: Scribners
- Media type: Print (magazine)
- Publication date: January 1900
- Pages: 13

"The Great Good Place" is a short story by Henry James, first published in Scribner's Magazine in 1900. The story portrays George Dane, a harried writer who dreams of escaping to a place where he can rest and recover before returning to the grind of his overloaded life. Dane gets his wish, at least in a memorable fantasy.

== Plot summary ==
After a long night of unfinished work, the morning dawns for George Dane, a writer whose life has grown too busy with his career and relationships. An unexpected breakfast guest appears and suddenly Dane is transported to a new environment, the great good place of the title. James describes this place as an unreal paradise. Guests even have to pay for service. The place seems more like a retreat or getaway resort, where Dane eventually recovers his peace of mind.

Dane spends three weeks at the place, and tells a Brother of his former life and the mysterious breakfast guest. Back in his usual world, Dane is eventually awakened by his servant after eight hours' sleep, and he realizes that his vision is gone. But the mysterious guest has straightened up his study, and Dane's life seems clearer and more manageable.

== Major themes ==
The place that Dane visits in his dream—or his supernatural and time-expanding experience, as James cleverly doesn't specify—seems a combination of retreat house, convent, country home, hotel, spa, resort and club. It's a very worldly place, not at all an earthly paradise or a Dante-like afterlife or an achievement of nirvana. Dane does not become a different person or encounter strange beings. He just meets ordinary people like himself who need a break from the grind.

Leon Edel even sniffed that the place seems rather "mundane and country-clubbish". James might not have taken this as particularly hurtful criticism, because he seems to have intended the great good place as something not out of the realm of normal human experience. Rather it's a temporary rest-stop to recharge and refresh, an accessible and comforting place instead of a weird or frightening one.

== Critical evaluation ==
When a book reviewer of The Morning Post criticized the story, James's friend H. G. Wells wrote to the paper's editor defending it: "His review cuts me the more keenly because 'The Great Good Place', concerning which story he uses this phrase, 'a succession of incoherent remarks and its drift quite unascertainable', has been a source of particular delight to me. I have read and re-read it many times. It seems to me to be just one of those happy, perfect things that come to reward the good artist for many laborious, not quite perfect days. And then—your reviewer's voice is heard. I cannot imagine the lack of imagination that fails to see that restful place Mr James has so happily invented." Many critics, such as Edward Wagenknecht and Clifton Fadiman, have praised the story as a parable about a necessary retreat from the overwhelming detail of an overstuffed life. Others, such as Edel and Pelham Edgar, have found James' great good place too routine or lazy or simply uninteresting.

James himself turned coy about the story and its origins, refusing in his New York Edition preface to discuss it much at all. He spends exactly 58 words on the tale, and says little more than that it "embodies a calculated effect."
