= The Ivory Tower =

Unfinished novel by Henry James

- First US edition
- Author: Henry James
- Language: English
- Publisher: Collins (UK); Scribners (US)
- Publication date: 6 September 1917
- Publication place: United Kingdom
- Media type: Print (Hardback & Paperback)
- Pages: 348 pp

The Ivory Tower is an unfinished novel by Henry James, posthumously published in 1917. The novel is a brooding story of Gilded Age America. It centers on the riches earned by a pair of dying millionaires and ex-partners, Abel Gaw and Frank Betterman, and their possibly corrupting effect on the people around them.

== Plot summary ==
Graham ("Gray") Fielder returns from Europe to the wealthy resort of Newport, Rhode Island, to see his dying uncle Frank Betterman. Rosanna Gaw, the daughter of Betterman's embittered ex-partner Abel Gaw, is also at Newport. She has succeeded in bringing about a partial reconciliation between the two elderly men.

Gaw and Betterman both die, and Fielder receives a large inheritance from his uncle. Gray is inexperienced at business, so he entrusts the management of the fortune to the unscrupulous Horton Vint. At this point the novel breaks off. From his extensive notes it appears that James intended Vint to betray Fielder's trust much as Kate Croy did with Milly Theale in The Wings of the Dove. Fielder would then magnanimously forgive Vint, but it is not certain if he would marry Rosanna, who may be in love with Gray.

== Major themes ==
James meant this novel as an attack on the gigantic wealth of the Gilded Age plutocrats. He presents Abel Gaw with almost Gothic intensity as a predatory financier, "with his beak, which had pecked so many hearts out, visibly sharper than ever." James portrays Betterman, as his name suggests, in a slightly more favorable light if only because he has repented somewhat for his past financial sins.

The younger people are equally reprehensible, with the possible exceptions of Rosanna and Gray. "We're all unspeakably corrupt," admits Vint. Vint and his lover Cissy Foy are reminiscent of Amerigo and Charlotte in The Golden Bowl in their love of wealth and pleasure.

According to James' notes, Fielder eventually comes to recognize "the black and merciless things that are behind the great possessions" and how those possessions have been "so dishonored and stained and blackened at their very roots, that it seems...they carry their curse with them." Which is probably as definite a statement of the novel's import as can be found.
