= Paste (story) =

1899 Short story by Henry James

- Short story by Henry James
- Country: United States
- Language: English
- Genre: Short story

Publication
- Published in: Frank Leslie's Popular Monthly
- Publication type: Periodical
- Media type: Print (Magazine, Hardback & Paperback)
- Publication date: December 1899
- Pages: 14 pp

"Paste" is a 5,800-word short story by Henry James first published in Frank Leslie’s Popular Monthly in December 1899. James included the story in his collection, The Soft Side, published by Macmillan the following year. James conceived the story as a clever reversal of Guy de Maupassant's "The Necklace".

== Plot summary ==
After the death of her aunt, the protagonist Charlotte and her aunt’s stepson Arthur Prime, find a tin of imitation jewelry which includes a string of pearls. Charlotte is immediately fascinated with the pearls, and wonders if they could be a gift from when her aunt was an actress. Arthur disputes this and is insulted at the thought of some gentleman other than his father giving his stepmother such a gift. Charlotte quickly apologizes and agrees that the pearls could be nothing more than paste. Arthur offers them to Charlotte, who accepts them in memory of her aunt.

When Charlotte returns to her governess job, her friend, Mrs. Guy, asks her if she has anything to add color to her dress for an upcoming party. When Charlotte shows Mrs. Guy the jewelry, she too becomes fascinated with the string of pearls, insisting that they are genuine. Mrs. Guy wears the string to the party; and when Charlotte finds out that everyone believed that they were real, she insists that they must be returned to Arthur. Mrs. Guy claims that it was Arthur's foolishness to have given away the necklace, and that Charlotte should feel no guilt in keeping it.

However, Charlotte decides to return the pearls to Arthur, who still refuses to consider the pearls real and says that he will take them to a store to determine whether they are real or merely paste. A month later Mrs. Guy shows her a wonderful string of pearls, telling Charlotte that they are the same ones that Charlotte had inherited from her aunt. Charlotte is surprised because Arthur claimed that the store had "pronounced them utter paste" and "that he had smashed them", when in fact, if Mrs. Guy was telling the truth, he had sold them to the store where Mrs. Guy bought them. But Charlotte wonders whether Mrs. Guy had "dealt with Arthur directly", and she realizes "that she had had his address".

== Major themes ==
"Paste" is one of James's briefer short stories, but it explores the contrast between reality and illusion that often fascinated its author in such longer and weightier tales as The Turn of the Screw. By his own account in the New York Edition preface, James consciously reversed Maupassant's grim melodrama of a fake necklace thought to be real into a more pleasant tale of a real necklace thought to be fake.
