= A London Life =

1888 novella by Henry James

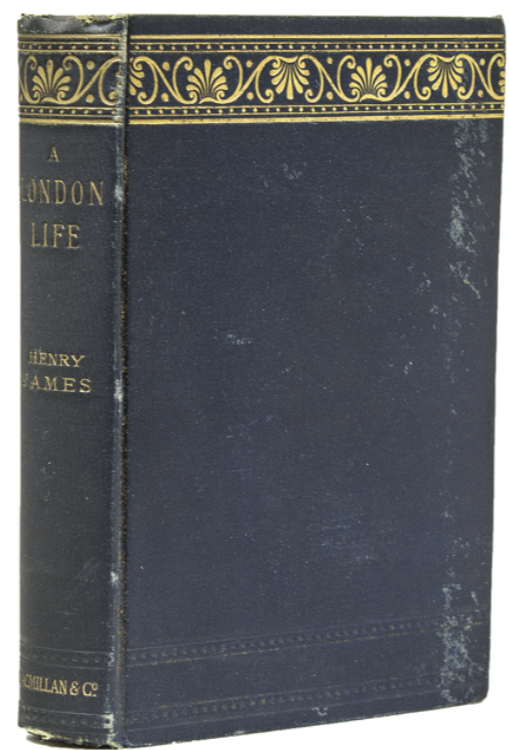
- Author: Henry James
- Language: English
- Genre: Novella
- Publisher: Scribner's Magazine
- Publication date: June–September 1888
- Publication place: United States
- Media type: Print
- Pages: 40

A London Life is a novella by Henry James, first published in Scribner's Magazine in 1888. The plot revolves around a crumbling marriage and its impact on many other people, especially Laura Wing, the sister of the soon-to-be-divorced wife. Laura is a classic Jamesian "central consciousness," whose reflections and emotions color the presentation of the storyline and the other characters. The tale is notable for its straightforward, even hard-edged approach to sexuality and divorce. This might reflect the influence of French naturalism on James during the 1880s.

== Plot summary ==
Laura Wing, an impoverished American girl, is visiting her sister Selina Berrington in London. Selina's husband Lionel, boorish and often drunk, is preparing to divorce his wife for her adultery with Charlie Crispin. Laura challenges Selina about her affair and doubts Selina's protestations of innocence. Lady Davenant, an elderly friend of the family, counsels Laura not to take her sister's marital troubles so hard.

Laura meets a pleasant but boring American named Wendover, who becomes a suitor. Eventually, after a tempestuous scene at the opera, Selina leaves her husband and goes to Brussels with Crispin. Laura spurns Wendover's marriage proposal which she believes is insincere and pursues her sister to Brussels, where she accomplishes nothing. Laura finally goes back to America, where Wendover follows her though there is no assurance as to how their future will play out. The story ends with a reminder that the case of Berrington v. Berrington and others is upcoming in the courts.

== Key themes ==
The rather Victorian adjective "unpleasant" has been applied to this story, much as it was long ago used for the products of Émile Zola and other French naturalists. James certainly tells his story in a blunt fashion, with no illusions about the delicacy or virtue of the Berringtons. The reader can sympathise with neither the oafish husband nor the frivolous wife. Even Laura Wing, the Jamesian central intelligence, is presented as extreme in her horrified reaction to the breakup of this distasteful couple.

Lady Davenant tries to supply a much needed dose of common sense to Laura when she advises that Selina and Lionel aren't worth the bother. The atmosphere of the story is similar to the corrupt and irresponsible milieu of What Maisie Knew, and Laura simply can't abide the inevitable sleaziness of, well, a London life. She proves completely ineffective in her attempts to save a marriage not worth saving, and her eventual flight to America is a sad admission of defeat.

Although several of the characters are American, James makes nothing of the international contrast. Many critics have wondered why James bothered with such an odd echo of his international theme, when all the characters could easily have been English without affecting the story in any way.

== Critical evaluation ==
Edmund Wilson liked this story for its no-nonsense approach to the realities of a marital breakup. He classed it as part of what he saw as James's best period, when the novelist "reaches what seems to me indisputably his completist artistic maturity: he has got over a certain stiffness, a certain naivete, which characterized his earlier work and he has acquired a new flexibility and a personal idiom."

Others have been much less kind. As mentioned above, Robert Gale tagged the story as "unpleasant" and Edward Wagenknecht found it "not technically impressive," with a "hurried ending" and a "rather forced" international note. Critics have also divided on Laura Wing, with Leon Edel dismissing her as "rigid and meddlesome" while Wagenknecht sympathizes with her in strong terms: "There is no character in his books—not even Isabel Archer, not even Fleda Vetch—to whom James commits himself more unreservedly than to Laura Wing". Such forceful reactions may testify to the power of the story's unembarrassed portrayal of a messy divorce.
