= The Tragic Muse =

1890 novel by Henry James

- First UK edition
- Author: Henry James
- Language: English
- Genre: Theatre-fiction
- Publisher: Houghton, Mifflin and Company, Boston; Macmillan and Co., London
- Publication date: Houghton: 7 June 1890; Macmillan: 28 June 1890
- Publication place: United States, United Kingdom
- Media type: Print (Serial)
- Pages: Houghton: volume one, 422; volume two, 460; Macmillan: volume one, 248; volume two, 252; volume three, 258

The Tragic Muse is a novel by Henry James, first published as a serial in The Atlantic Monthly in 1889–1890 and then as a book in 1890. This wide, cheerful panorama of English life follows the fortunes of two would-be artists: Nick Dormer, who throws over a political career in his efforts to become a painter, and Miriam Rooth, an actress striving for artistic and commercial success. A cast of supporting characters help and hinder their pursuits.

== Synopsis ==
Nicholas "Nick" Dormer wants to pursue a career in painting instead of his family's traditional role in British politics. This upsets his family and particularly his lady friend, Julia Dallow, a beautiful but demanding woman deeply involved in political campaigns. But Nick's old Oxford friend Gabriel Nash encourages him to follow his desire to become an artist. Despite his misgivings Nick goes through an election campaign, supported by Julia, and wins a seat in Parliament. He proposes marriage to Julia but they agree to wait.

Meanwhile, Nick's cousin Peter Sherringham, a rising young man in the British diplomatic service, encounters a young actress, Miriam Rooth, in Paris. He falls in love with Miriam, who shows great energy but is a woefully raw talent. Peter introduces Miriam to French acting coach Madame Carre, and Miriam begins to improve her acting technique greatly.

Nick seeks to become an artist and resigns from Parliament. He thus loses a large bequest from his political patron, Mr. Carteret. Nick becomes a full-time painter, and when Miriam comes to London in search of theatrical success, she sits to Nick for her portrait as "the tragic muse." Julia finds the two together in the studio. Although nothing improper is going on, Julia suddenly and bitterly realizes that Nick is dedicated to art and will never return to politics.

Peter proposes marriage to Miriam, but she refuses. Peter accepts a diplomatic assignment in Central America. Miriam eventually triumphs as an actress, especially as Juliet. Peter returns to London to see her debut in this role, and to propose to her again; but she is already married to Basil Dashwood, her fellow actor and business manager. Peter marries Nick's sister Biddie instead, and the novel ends with a suggestion that Nick and Julia may eventually marry, after all.

== Major themes ==
Because of its focus on theatre, The Tragic Muse has been discussed as theatre-fiction, which Graham Wolfe explains as "referring to novels and stories that engage in concrete and sustained ways with theatre as artistic practice and industry". James completed this novel just as he embarked on his ultimately disastrous attempt to conquer the stage. The book reflects his lifelong fascination with the theater—and his ambivalent attitude towards theatrical people. Miriam Rooth is a magnificent creation, and the reader can't help but admire her tireless energy as she perfects her talent and earns great success. But James hardly portrays her as a saint, as he never minimizes her faults. In the preface to the New York Edition text of the novel, James regretted that he hadn't succeeded completely with Nick Dormer. The ambivalent politician turned painter does suffer in comparison with the radiant Miriam, but his dilemma is still interesting and sharply drawn.

This novel seems strangely "un-Jamesian" in that it wanders amiably along, with a large cast—the Henry James Encyclopedia counts more than fifty named characters, although only a dozen or so play an active role—and a lot of things happening in a sometimes disjointed way. The overarching and solidly constructed form that James usually imposes on his material appears absent here. The double plot makes for a rather sprawling book, less reminiscent of James' other novels and more like the great Victorian epics by Dickens and Thackeray.

== Critical evaluation ==
The Tragic Muse largely failed with critics and public when it was originally published. To this day the novel has attracted relatively little critical attention. This lukewarm attitude may stem from the "un-Jamesian" nature of the book mentioned above. Aside from its preoccupation with the theater and art in general, The Tragic Muse does not address many of James' more characteristic themes.

Critics have generally applauded Miriam Rooth as one of James' liveliest creations. There has been some speculation about the model for Gabriel Nash, who sounds at times like Oscar Wilde. However, James actually seems to have based the character on an acquaintance named Herbert Pratt, a well-heeled, guitar-playing American wanderer, who was a Cambridge friend of William James. Having listened to Pratt's colourful stories, James jotted down in his Notebooks on November 25, 1881: "[Pratt] was a most singular, most interesting type, and I shall certainly put him in a novel. I shall even make the portrait close and he won't mind...A good deal might be done with Herbert Pratt".

Many commentators are willing to grant James' assertion in the New York Edition preface that the novel maintains a pleasant "tone" or charm or ambiance.

== Stage adaptation ==
A dramatization of the novel was presented as part of the Gilded Stage Festival at The Metropolitan Playhouse in New York City in January 2014. The adaptation was written by Mark Dundas Wood and was directed by Jesse Jou.
