= Under Heaven (film) =

- Directed by: Meg Richman
- Written by: Meg Richman
- Based on: The Wings of the Dove by Henry James
- Produced by: Mickey Liddell; Robin Schorr; Brian Swardstrom
- Starring: Joely Richardson; Aden Young; Molly Parker
- Cinematography: Claudio Rocha
- Edited by: Debbie Zeitman
- Music by: Marc Olsen
- Production company: Banner Entertainment
- Distributed by: Banner Entertainment
- Release dates: 19 January 1998 (Sundance Film Festival); 17 July 1998 (United States)
- Running time: 112 minutes
- Country: United States
- Language: English

Under Heaven, also known as In the Shadows, is a 1998 American drama film directed by Meg Richman and starring Joely Richardson, Aden Young, and Molly Parker. The film premiered at the 1998 Sundance Film Festival and received a limited release on July 17, 1998. The story is a modern reworking of the Henry James novel The Wings of the Dove.

== Plot ==
In Seattle, Cynthia and Buck are a pair of struggling musicians. The ambitious Cynthia decides to break up with Buck, who is unemployed and has a drug addiction. She answers an ad for a live-in caretaker placed by Eleanor Dunston, a wealthy, terminally ill woman. After Cynthia is hired, the two women gradually form a bond despite coming from opposite ends of the economic spectrum. However, Cynthia harbors an envy of Eleanor's luxurious life.

Buck comes back into Cynthia's life when she accidentally runs into him. Realizing she is still in love with Buck, who now claims to be sober, Cynthia arranges for him to work at Eleanor's house and introduces him as her half-brother. Buck secures a job as a gardener for Eleanor. At nights he meets up for trysts with Cynthia.

Cynthia notices Eleanor developing a physical attraction to Buck and subsequently comes up with a scheme that she believes will solve her and Buck's problems. The plan involves Buck courting Eleanor. Buck is at first reluctant to do so, but soon a tempestuous ménage à trois-like relationship forms between the three of them.

== Cast ==
- Joely Richardson as Eleanor Dunston
- Aden Young as Buck
- Molly Parker as Cynthia
- Kevin Phillip as John
- Krisha Fairchild as Cynthia's Mother
- Marjorie Nelson as Mrs. Fletcher

== Production ==
The script had been developed at the Sundance Screenwriters' Lab and was initially titled Wings of an Angel. The film had originally been announced in 1995 as part of the first slate of the newly formed Fox Searchlight Pictures. It later moved to Beacon Entertainment before Banner Entertainment acquired it. Filming took place during December 1997 in Seattle.

== Release ==
The film premiered not long after the release of another adaptation of The Wings of the Dove, directed by Iain Softley.

== Reception ==
Emanuel Levy of Variety gave a negative review, writing that the film is "marred by an obvious narrative, shallow psychological motivations and pat ending." Though he praised Richardson's acting, Levy wrote, "Deviating from James’ great and complex novel, in which emotional ambiguity and moral dilemmas prevail up to the end, Richman's script is too simplistic. Its incidental humor is not enough to make the yarn engaging."

Ruthe Stein of the San Francisco Chronicle was more positive, writing that compared to Softley's film, "what this version lacks in lavishness it makes up for in raw emotion." Stein was also complimentary of Richman's visual style, the Seattle scenery, and Richman's "bold decision to graphically portray the illness." Criticisms were mainly of the film's script, which Richard von Busack of Metro Silicon Valley described as having "the scent of secondhand experience, the air of student drama, complete with blocky morals; a happy, beautiful death; and a preposterous renunciation."

Joely Richardson was nominated for an Independent Spirit Award for Best Supporting Female for her performance.
