= The Ambassadors (novel) =

1903 novel by Henry James

- Cover of the first UK edition
- Author: Henry James
- Language: English
- Genre: Dark Comedy
- Publisher: Methuen & Company, London; Harper & Brothers, New York City
- Publication date: Methuen: 28 September 1903; Harpers: 9 November 1903
- Publication place: United Kingdom, United States
- Media type: Print (Serial)
- Pages: Methuen: 458; Harpers: 432
- OCLC: 503867

The Ambassadors is a 1903 novel by Henry James, originally published as a serial in the North American Review. The novel is a dark comedy which follows the trip of protagonist Lewis Lambert Strether to Paris, France to bring Chad Newsome, the son of his widowed fiancée, Mrs Newsome, back to the family business. The novel is written in the third-person, from Strether's point of view.

== Synopsis ==
Lewis Lambert Strether, the protagonist of the novel, is a cultured man who is 55 years old from the fictional town of Woollett, Massachusetts, who is dispatched to Paris, France to find Chad Newsome, the 28-year-old wayward son of his fiancée Mrs Newsome. The book is entirely told from Strether's point of view and chronicles his change from an American view of things to a European one.

Strether, a middle-aged 55-year-old American of insignificant means, is sent to Paris by Mrs. Newsome, his wealthy fiancée. The task he has been given is to coax her 28-year-old son, Chad, into returning to the family business in Woollett, Massachusetts. The Newsome family becomes suspicious of Chad, believing he might be overstaying his European tour because of an inappropriate and scandalous romantic liaison with a French woman named Madame Marie de Vionnet. The reader is given to understand, in indirect ways, that if Strether fails, his engagement to Mrs. Newsome is at risk. Strether meets Maria Gostrey who delivers valuable insights about things European to him (and the reader).

Once Strether locates Chad, he is surprised to discover that Chad has improved from when he last knew him in America. Chad exhibits restrained urbanity, elegance and manners. This is not what Strether expected of someone in the grip of an inappropriate romantic entanglement. Strether wonders what has caused the transformation he sees in Chad. When Chad offers to introduce him to some of his close friends—Madame de Vionnet and her grown daughter Jeanne—Strether eagerly accepts. Miss Gostrey is also in Paris and continues as Strether’s advisor. She reveals she knew Madame de Vionnet at finishing school in Switzerland. When the introduction occurs, Strether finds the mother and the daughter to be refined, virtuous and thoroughly admirable. He wonders if the lovely daughter is what has brought about the improvements in Chad. He learns that Madame de Vionnet is married but has been separated from her husband for years.

Strether himself is introduced to Paris in a way that starts to open his own mind and heart to a larger vision of the world's possibilities. He feels alive and renewed. His own interest in returning to America wanes. It is also clear that he is not exerting himself to talk Chad into returning. He develops an admiration for Madame de Vionnet. Chad has made clear he has no interest in marrying Jeanne de Vionnet, for whom he arranges a suitable marriage, while his liaison continues "virtuously" with Mme de Vionnet.

Meanwhile, Mrs. Newsome grows tired of Strether's failure to act. She sends over a set of new ambassadors to accomplish the mission—including her daughter and son-in-law. The group clearly doesn't see Paris, life's possibilities, Chad or Madame de Vionnet in the same way that Strether does. Sarah (Newsome) Pocock demands that Strether get himself in line and insist to Chad that Chad return. The Pocock party departs on a brief tour before their departure for home.

Strether takes a day for himself to enjoy the countryside, and happens upon Chad and Madame de Vionnet in a manner that makes it evident that they are romantically and sexually involved. He feels disappointed but still acknowledges the improvements in Chad's character.

Chad seems tempted to return to Woollett, which might mean the sundering of his relationship with Madame de Vionnet, despite his acknowledgement that this would abandon her to a condition of social and emotional desolation.

Strether will return to Woollett.

The story ends abruptly, leaving the characters' future movements an open question.

== Publication history ==
The publishing history of The Ambassadors is complex, even for a work by James. The novel was written between October 1900 and July 1901, before The Wings of the Dove (1902), yet he did not immediately find a publisher. To fit the eventual North American Review serialization (from January to December 1903), passages were omitted, including three chapters.

For the book versions, James expected to use the serial-version proofs to provide the majority of copy to the London and New York City publishers, but the North American Review supplied him only one set, instead of the requested two; thus, in August 1903, James supplied the British publisher with a carbon-copy of the unrevised, original typescript to enable them to meet their scheduled publication date. Moreover, at that time, he also lacked duplicate copies of the omitted passages, and those two circumstances resulted in significant textual variations in the Methuen edition.

One of the most serious variations was that a chapter, not published in the serial version, was inserted before 'chapter 28', not after it, as in the Harper edition (which James thoroughly proof-read). Five years later, when he prepared the revised text for the collection New York Edition, James worked from the Harper edition, and the two chapters (numbers 28 and 29) became chapters 1 and 2 in book 11.

In 1950, Robert E. Young, knowing neither the Methuen edition difference nor the details of James's work on the novel, argued that the New York Edition order was incorrect, based upon the chronology of the story's events. Most critics agreed with Young, especially when Leon Edel noted the Methuen edition order, and, since then, most published versions of The Ambassadors, which usually use the New York Edition text, have reversed the order of the two chapters; however, the textual and bibliographical scholar Jerome McGann reopened the question in 1992. He noted that the publishing history revealed by Birch made it unlikely that James had the order wrong in the editions he closely supervised. Moreover, he controversially claimed that when James wrote to novelist Mary Augusta Ward mentioning a "fearful ... weakness" he was referring to the chapter order in her Methuen edition copy.

McGann explained the chronological discrepancies by noting that the start of (the Harper edition) chapter 28 tells that it will describe a conversation that will occur in the 'future' (relative to the juncture reached in the story), and that the 'that evening' line, at the start of chapter 29, refers not to the evening just described in chapter 28, but to the previous one.

Since 1992, few publishers of new editions of The Ambassadors have followed McGann's research and restored James's apparently preferred order, but, in characteristic postmodern way, it is now up to the reader to decide in which order these chapters should be read.

== Major themes ==
Henry James got the idea for The Ambassadors from his friend, novelist William Dean Howells, who while visiting his son in Paris was so impressed with European culture that he wondered if life hadn't passed him by.

The theme of liberation from a cramped, almost starved, emotional life into a more generous and gracious existence plays throughout The Ambassadors, yet it is noteworthy that James does not naïvely portray Paris as a faultless paradise for culturally stunted Americans. Strether learns about the reverse side of the European coin when he sees how desperately Marie fears losing Chad, after all she has done for him. As one critic proposed, Strether does not shed his American straitjacket only to be fitted with a more elegant European model, but instead learns to evaluate every situation on its merits, without prejudices, by selection. The final lesson of Strether's European experience is to distrust preconceived notions and perceptions from anyone, anywhere, but to rely upon his own observation and judgment.

Mediation/Intermediation: a major theme of the novel involves Strether's position as an ambassador. Strether, when giving his final account to Maria Gostrey, justifies his decisions by connecting his intermediary position to his concerns about gaining experience (and pleasure) whilst working on behalf of others. This conflict between personal desire and duty is important to consider when thinking about Strether's psychology.

== Literary significance and criticism ==
In the New York Edition preface Henry James proclaimed The Ambassadors as the best of his novels. Critics have generally agreed that it ranks high in the list of his achievements, though E. M. Forster and F. R. Leavis have been notable dissenters. James's evocation of Paris has gained many plaudits, as the city becomes a well-realized symbol of the beauty and the sorrow of European culture.

Critical controversy has swirled over Strether's refusal of Maria Gostrey, with some seeing it as a perverse rejection of his best chance for happiness. Others have said that Strether, whilst a great friend of Maria's, is not in love with her, and that the couple could not have made a successful marriage. Critics also have speculated about whether or not Chad will heed Strether's advice to remain with Marie, or if he will return to America for the substantial rewards of family business – their general verdict is that Chad will follow the money.

In a letter to a friend, James said that Strether bears a vague resemblance (though not facial) to his creator. It is true that Strether shows an ability to grow in understanding and good judgment, although some critics have seen him as limited and timid, despite his European experiences.

A continuing literary mystery is the nature of the "little nameless object" made in Woollett. Strether calls it: "a little thing they make—make better, it appears, than other people can, or than other people, at any rate, do"; and he calls the business: "a manufacture that, if it's only properly looked after, may well be on the way to become a monopoly". In an article in Slate magazine, Joshua Glenn proposes that the nameless object is a toothpick, while other critics have proposed matches, toilet articles, button hooks, et cetera.

In 1998, the Modern Library ranked The Ambassadors 27th on its list of the 100 best English-language novels of the 20th century.

== Adaptations and influences ==
=== Literature ===
- Patricia Highsmith's novel, The Talented Mr. Ripley (1955), begins with the protagonist, Tom Ripley, traveling to Europe in pursuit of a wealthy man's son with orders to bring him back to the family business. The inspiration is acknowledged in the novel with an explicit mention of James' The Ambassadors.
- Cynthia Ozick's novel, Foreign Bodies (2010), tells the story of The Ambassadors with a woman as the protagonist.

=== Stage productions ===
A musical theatre version of The Ambassadors, titled Ambassador, was first produced in 1971 in London's West End, then on Broadway in 1972; it proved unsuccessful.

=== Television ===
The BBC television adaptation of the novel for their Play of the Month television series first aired on March 13, 1977, with Paul Scofield as Strether and Lee Remick as Maria Gostrey, directed by James Cellan Jones.
