= Europe (short story) =

1899 Short story by Henry James

- Short story by Henry James
- Country: United States
- Language: English
- Genre: Short story

Publication
- Published in: Scribner's Magazine
- Publication type: Periodical
- Publisher: Charles Scribner's Sons
- Media type: Print (Magazine)
- Publication date: June 1899
- Pages: 9 pp

"Europe" is a short story by Henry James first published in Scribner's Magazine in June 1899. In his preface to the story in the New York Edition (1907–1909) of his fiction, James says he got one hint for this domestic tragicomedy from a visit to an elderly lady who largely lived in her recollections of an early trip to Europe. James later heard about her aging daughters who had never been to Europe and much regretted the fact. He combined the two suggestions in a clever plot and produced a brilliant, polished gem of short narrative.

== Plot summary ==
The narrator visits the New England home of an ancient widow, Mrs. Rimmle, and her three aging daughters: Becky, Jane and Maria. Long ago Mrs. Rimmle visited Europe, which was the great event of her life. The daughters would also like to see Europe but their mother falls ill whenever their plans get close to materializing. Finally, family friends take Jane to Europe, where she is too happy ever to return.

When the narrator next sees Mrs. Rimmle, she tells him that Jane has died abroad, which is not true, and that Becky will soon be going to Europe. Becky never actually gets away from the family house and finally dies. When he last visits the family, the nearly mummified Mrs. Rimmle tells the narrator that Becky has "gone to Europe," a sad euphemism for her death.

== Major themes ==
The story is a black comedy variant of James' old "international theme" of the Old World versus the New. The comedy grows bitter, though, as the witch-like Mrs. Rimmle slowly squeezes the life out of her daughters with her unrelenting psychological dominance. Although one of the daughters escapes Mrs. Rimmle's grasp to enjoy a ripe second youth in Europe, the other two are not so lucky.

Mrs. Rimmle has been seen as the embodiment of New England Puritanism in her ability to control her daughters by guilt-tripping them. James ridicules the old woman fairly severely but she is by no means powerless to enforce her will. James was proud of the compression he achieved in this story and the way he dramatized the quiet but intense struggle between the ancient widow and her daughters. The narrative's dark humor only heightens the pathos of thwarted and wasted lives.

== Critical evaluation ==
The story has generally been a favorite of critics for the bittersweet account of each daughter's fate and the suavity of the narrator in relating the sometimes grim details. Although the story wastes little time on local-color description, the entire narrative is imbued with the atmosphere of primitive New England, as personified by the aged Mrs. Rimmle.

The domineering widow seems almost as old as the Salem witch trials and brings more than a little of their spirit into the story. In his book-length study of Nathaniel Hawthorne, James noted how adroitly the older novelist used New England's Puritan heritage to deepen and darken his tales. James achieves something of the same effect in "Europe".
