= The Bostonians =

1886 novel by Henry James

- First edition
- Author: Henry James
- Language: English
- Publisher: Macmillan and Co., London
- Publication date: 16 February 1886
- Publication place: United Kingdom
- Media type: Print (serial)
- Pages: Volume one, 244; volume two, 226; volume three, 232
- OCLC: 3179002

The Bostonians is a novel by Henry James, first published as a serial in The Century Magazine in 1885–1886 and then as a book in 1886. This bittersweet tragicomedy centres on an odd triangle of characters: Basil Ransom, a political conservative from Mississippi; Olive Chancellor, Ransom's cousin and a Boston feminist; and Verena Tarrant, a pretty, young protégée of Olive's in the feminist movement. The storyline concerns the struggle between Ransom and Olive for Verena's allegiance and affection, though the novel also includes a wide panorama of political activists, newspaper people, and quirky eccentrics.

== Publication ==
Henry James originally entered into an agreement with the Boston publisher James R. Osgood & Co. to publish the book in the United States for $4,000. Osgood made a separate agreement with The Century for the magazine to serialize the novel. In May 1885, before the serialization had finished and James had been paid any of the money owed to him, Osgood's firm went bankrupt. James was able to recover part of the lost sum by selling the copyright to Macmillan and Co., which published The Bostonians in a three-volume edition in Britain in February 1886, and in a one-volume edition in the US in May 1886. James was not, however, able to recover any money for the serialization in The Century.

== Synopsis ==
When Basil Ransom, a Mississippi lawyer and Confederate Civil War veteran, visits his affluent cousin Olive Chancellor in Boston, she reluctantly takes him to a political meeting where Verena Tarrant delivers a feminist speech. Ransom, a stubborn conservative who opposes women's suffrage, is discomfited by the speech but fascinated with the speaker. Olive, who has never seen Verena before, is equally fascinated. She persuades Verena to leave her parents' house, move in with her, and study in preparation for a larger role in the feminist movement. Meanwhile, Ransom returns to his law practice in New York, which is not doing well. Still enchanted with Verena, he visits Boston again, travels to Cambridge where she is visiting her parents, and walks with her through the grounds of Harvard College, including the Civil War Memorial Hall. Verena finds herself attracted to the charismatic Ransom and, without telling him of her decision, accedes to his request not to disclose their encounter to Olive, who, she well understands, strongly objects to her southern cousin's beliefs and fears he will come between her and Verena.

As Olive prepares Verena to become a platform speaker supporting the cause of feminism and the liberation of women from male domination, she accepts an invitation to speak in New York to a gathering of fashionable women from Mrs. Burrage, a very rich society woman whose son, Henry, had courted and been rejected by Verena in Boston when he was a student at Harvard College. Basil, invited by Mrs. Burrage at the request of Verena, comes to her talk. When Olive learns that Verena had requested Basil be invited and that, back in Boston, she had received a letter from him, she begins to fear that he will take her young protegée away. When the two women return to their temporary quarters on Tenth Avenue before going out to dine with Henry Burrage, they find two notes, one from Basil requesting an hour of Verena's time and another from Mrs. Burrage inviting Olive to her house for a conversation. During her meeting with Mrs. Burrage, Olive discovers that she is acting on behalf of her son, who still wants to marry Verena. Though she despises men and wants to hold onto Verena, Olive gives serious thought to supporting Mrs. Burrage's proposal after she leaves her house. But when she returns to Tenth Avenue, she discovers that Verena has gone out walking with Basil. During their walk, Basil expounds on his belief that women should not be granted suffrage and legal equality to men because their proper sphere is within the home wives and mothers. Attracted by his manner and personality, but appalled by his views, Verena leaves him and falls into Olive's arms, begging in tears that they immediately leave New York and return to Boston.

Some time later, Olive and Verena are taking an August holiday in Marmion, a fictional seaside community in Cape Cod, where Verena is preparing for her first important public appearance as an advocate of feminism. Olive has hired an agent and rented the Boston Music Hall for Verena's speech. When Basil shows up in Marmion, he tells Verena that he finally feels able to ask her to marry him because, with the imminent publication of an article setting forth his conservative views, he now believes he has a future he can share with her. Verena is more drawn to him than ever, but the death of Miss Birdseye, a companion in their rented cottage and a notable reformer and abolitionist, makes Verena flee again. Unable to bear the thought of abandoning Miss Birdseye's ideals and wounding Olive, she goes into hiding to prevent Basil from following her.

On the night that Verena is to speak at the Boston Music Hall, she sees Basil in the audience before she comes out to give her address and becomes unable to take the stage. Despite the presence of a policeman guarding the door backstage, Basil forces his way in and compels Verena to elope with him, to the distress of Olive and her fellow feminists. The final sentence of the novel mentions Verena in tears—not to be her last, James's narrator assures the reader.

== Themes ==
Unlike much of James' work, The Bostonians deals with explicitly political themes: feminism and the general role of women in society. James was at best ambivalent about the feminist movement: he wrote to a suffragette friend on April 6, 1909: "I confess I am not eager for the avènement of a multitudinous & overwhelming female electorate—& don't see how any man in his senses can be." Another theme in the book, much discussed recently, is Olive's possible lesbian attraction to Verena. The term Boston marriage came to connote just such an ambiguous co-habiting long-term relationship between two women. James is not explicit here, partially due to the conventions of the time. But this vagueness—because it creates possible ambiguity about Olive's motives—may enrich the novel.

People divide over how to read the book. To some, as Ransom gets closer to winning Verena, he seems to lose at least some of his creator's sympathy; to others, none at all. To some, he becomes more sympathetic to Olive in the later chapters as she begins to lose Verena; to others, he merely observes her suffering. Some think her painful recognition of her situation somewhat similar to Isabel Archer's long nighttime meditation in chapter 42 of The Portrait of a Lady; others do not.

The three central characters are surrounded by a vivid supporting cast of would-be reformers, cynical journalists, and sometimes sinister hangers-on.

The title refers, not to the people of Boston in general, but to the two characters Olive and Verena, "as they appeared to the mind of Ransom, the southerner, and outsider, looking at them from New York".

== Critical evaluation ==
The Bostonians was not well received by contemporary critics, especially in North America. James himself once wrote an observation that The Bostonians had never, "even to my much-disciplined patience, received any sort of justice". James' portrayal of Boston reformers was denounced as inaccurate and unfair, especially because some felt James had satirised actual persons in the novel. Darrel Abel observes that when the novel was first published in Century Magazine in 1885, the people of Boston were very displeased:

The Bostonians resented its satire upon their intellectual and humanitary aspirations. They resented the author's evident sympathy with his reactionary Southern hero—a sympathy perhaps partly picked up from the British, who admired the Southern gentleman more than the Yankee reformer. The Bostonians considered Miss Birdseye an insulting caricature of Miss Elizabeth Peabody, the sister-in-law of Hawthorne, associate of Alcott, and friend of Emerson, and therefore too sacrosanct a personage to be placed in a humorous light. But probably most offensive to Boston propriety were the unmistakable indications of Lesbianism in the portrait of Olive Chancellor, which made it a violation of Boston decency and reticence.

Horace Scudder reviewed the book in 1886, calling it an unfair treatment of characters whom the author simply did not like, although James had a definite interest in them:

When we say that most of the characters are repellent, we are simply recording the effect which they produce upon the reader by reason of the attitude which the author of their being takes toward them. He does not love them. Why should he ask more of us? But since he is extremely interested in them, and seems never wearied of setting them in every possible light, we also accede to this interest, and if we have time enough strike up an extraordinary intimacy with all parties. It is when this interest leads Mr. James to push his characters too near the brink of nature that we step back and decline to follow.

Mark Twain vowed that he would rather be damned to John Bunyan's heaven than read the book. The letter in which Twain wrote this remark also contains invectives against the works of George Eliot and Nathaniel Hawthorne. Albert Bigelow Paine wrote in his annotation: "It is as easy to understand Mark Twain's enjoyment of Indian Summer as his revolt against Daniel Deronda and The Bostonians. He cared little for writing that did not convey its purpose in the simplest and most direct terms".

Rebecca West described the book, in her biography of Henry James, as "a foolish song set to a good tune in the way it fails to 'come off'". She praised the book's language and themes, but thought the book's political content was strained and unnecessary; she believed that James, by emphasising the political aspects of the subject matter, had inadvertently distracted the reader from what he actually had set out to say: "The pioneers who wanted to raise the small silvery song of art had to tempt their audiences somehow from the big brass band of America's political movements".

Some later critics, though uncomfortable with what they think the novel's rather static nature and perhaps excessive length, have found more to praise in James' account of the contest for Verena and his description of the wider background of feminism and other reform movements. Edmund Wilson wrote in 1938, in his book The Triple Thinkers: Ten Essays on Literature: "The first hundred pages of The Bostonians, with the arrival of the young Southerner in Boston and his first contacts with the Boston reformers, is, in its way, one of the most masterly things that Henry James ever did". The quiet but significant struggle between Olive Chancellor and Basil Ransom does seem more pertinent and engrossing today than it might have appeared to 19th century readers, because it records the struggles of a historical period that has had a profound impact upon the kind of country America has become.

F. R. Leavis praised the book as "one of the two most brilliant novels in the language", the other being James's The Portrait of a Lady. Leavis described it as "wonderfully rich, intelligent and brilliant . . . It could have been written only by James, and it has an overt richness of life such as is not commonly associated with him".

James bemoaned the adverse effect that this novel and The Princess Casamassima (published in the same year) had on his critical fortunes. Although he did not turn away from political themes completely, he never again gave political ideas such a prominent place in his fiction.

According to Henry James' 'Notebooks', the "initial idea" of The Bostonians came from Alphonse Daudet's novel The Evangelist, also about an evangelical older woman who draws a young woman under her sway to serve her cause (religion, rather than suffrage).

== Film version ==
The Bostonians was filmed in 1984 by the Merchant Ivory team (director James Ivory, producer Ismail Merchant, writer Ruth Prawer Jhabvala) with Christopher Reeve, Vanessa Redgrave and Madeleine Potter in the three central roles.

The film earned good reviews, with an 81% "fresh" rating on Rotten Tomatoes. Vanessa Redgrave's performance also received high marks, as well as nominations for the 1984 Golden Globe and Academy Award for Best Actress, while the film itself earned other award nominations for costume design and cinematography.

The 2005 independent drama film The Californians is an updated adaptation of the story.

== Cultural references ==
- A young Olive Chancellor appears as a character in Alan Moore's The League of Extraordinary Gentlemen, appearing alongside Rosa Coote, Rebecca Randall, Katy Carr, and Pollyanna Whittier in the 'Correctional Academy of Young Gentlewomen'.

== See also ==
- Boston marriage
- Misogyny
