= In the Cage =

1898 novella by Henry James

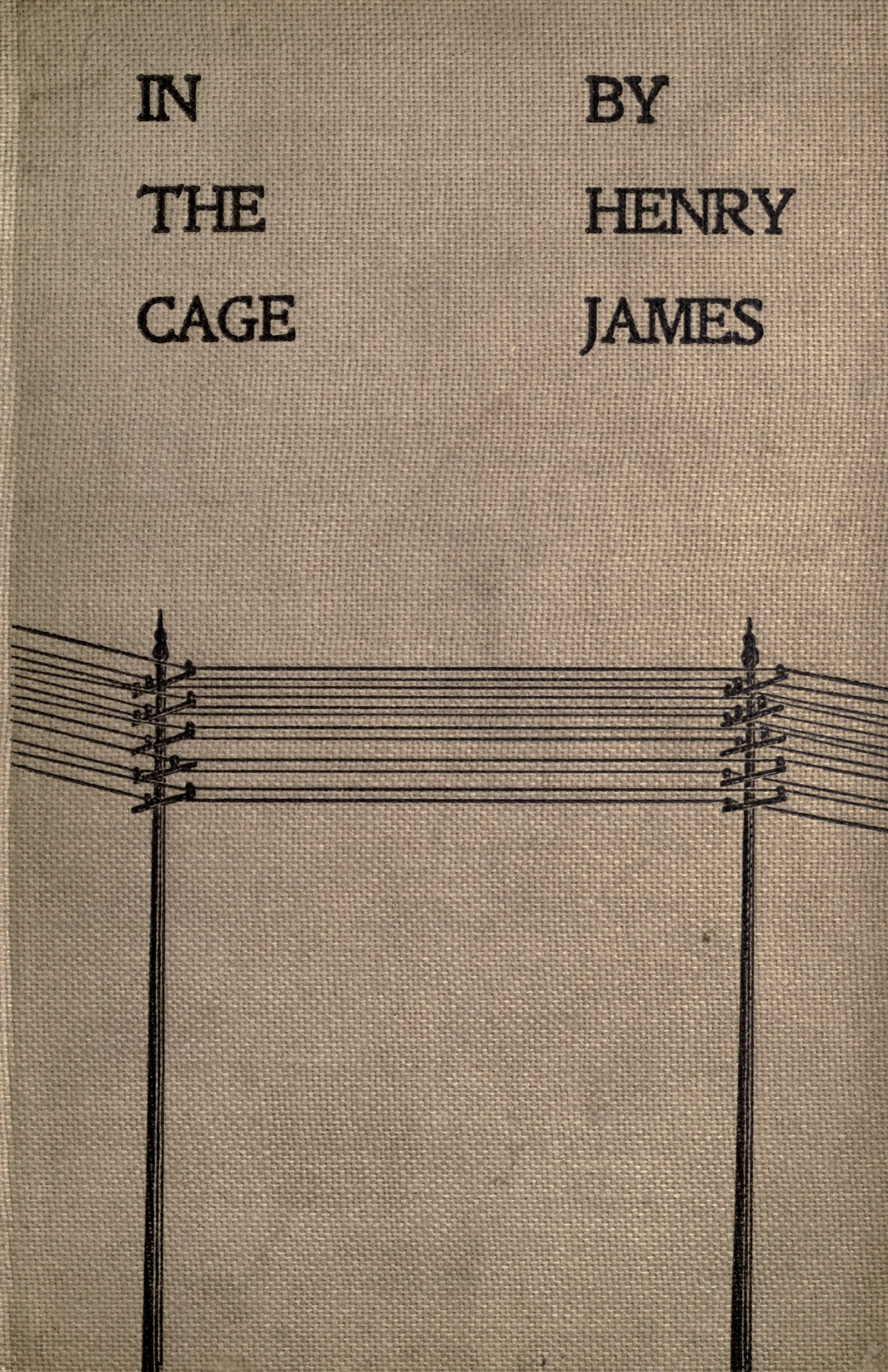
- First UK edition
- Author: Henry James
- Language: English
- Publisher: Duckworth, London; Herbert S. Stone & Company, Chicago
- Publication date: Duckworth: 8-Aug-1898; Stone: 26-Sept-1898
- Publication place: United Kingdom, United States
- Media type: Print
- Pages: Duckworth: 187; Stone: 229

In the Cage is a novella by Henry James, first published as a book in 1898. This long story centers on an unnamed London telegraphist. She deciphers clues to her clients' personal lives from the often cryptic telegrams they submit to her as she sits in the "cage" at the post office. Sensitive and intelligent, the telegraphist eventually finds out more than she may want to know.

== Plot summary ==
An unnamed telegraphist works in the branch post office at Cocker's, a grocer in a fashionable London neighborhood. Her fiancé, a decent if unpolished man named Mr. Mudge, wants her to move to a less expensive neighborhood to save money and to be near him at all times. She refuses because she likes the glimpses of society life she gets from the telegrams at her current location.

Through those telegrams, she gets "involved" with a pair of lovers named Captain Everard and Lady Bradeen. By remembering certain code numbers in the telegrams, she manages to reassure Everard at a particular crisis that their secrets are safe from detection. Later she learns from her friend Mrs. Jordan that Lady Bradeen and Everard are getting married after the recent death of Lord Bradeen. The unnamed telegraphist also learns that Everard is heavily in debt and that Lady Bradeen is forcing him to marry her, as Everard is really not interested in her. The telegraphist finally decides to marry Mudge and reflects on the unusual events of which she was a part.

== Key themes ==
James frequently sent telegrams (over a hundred are still extant) and he got the idea for this clever tale from his experiences at the telegraphist's office. The unnamed protagonist of In the Cage can be seen as a version of the Jamesian artist, constructing a complex finished work from the slightest hints. Her knack of deducing the details of her customers' lives from their brief, cryptic telegrams is similar, in some ways, to James' ability to invent stories from the tiniest suggestions - an ability he often discussed in the New York Edition prefaces.

== Critical evaluation ==
Critics have generally been very kind to this relatively little-known story. The detailed and convincing portrait of the telegraphist has garnered much praise. More politically-inclined critics have appreciated James's ability to present a working-class woman with sympathy and accuracy.

Some have compared the story to The Turn of the Screw, published just before In the Cage. The unnamed protagonists of both stories do display active imaginations, but the telegraphist seems much better grounded in reality. At least critics do not ask whether she has imagined Captain Everard and Lady Bradeen. A few critics have amused themselves by trying to guess exactly what the telegraphist deciphered from the telegrams between Captain Everard and Lady Bradeen. James himself said that he didn't know and he didn't want to know.

The young lady has read perhaps a few too many ha'penny novels, has a lively imagination and a nearly photographic memory. Her decision to marry her ordinary young man—as soon as possible—is a revolt against her discovery that the necessary "hero" and "heroine" she has created from their telegrams-aren't that at all. Although James sees the telegraphist as a member of her class, surely, the story is not one of class conflict. It is not that she believes all young, wealthy men and women are good, only that, well, her wealthy young man and women must surely be. Unfortunately, they prove to be more real than wonderful.
