= The American (novel) =

1877 novel by Henry James

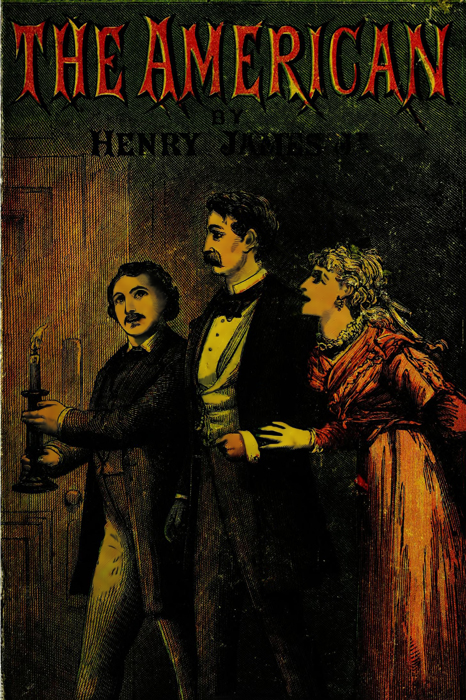
- Cover of The American
- Author: Henry James
- Language: English
- Genre: Novel
- Publisher: James R. Osgood and Company, Boston
- Publication date: 28 May 1877
- Publication place: United States
- Media type: Print (Serial, Hardback & Paperback)
- Pages: 435 pp
- Preceded by: Roderick Hudson
- Followed by: The Europeans
- Text: The American at Wikisource

The American is a novel by Henry James, originally published as a serial in The Atlantic Monthly in 1876–77 and then as a book in 1877.

The novel is an uneasy combination of social comedy and melodrama concerning the adventures and misadventures of Christopher Newman, an essentially good-hearted but rather gauche American businessman on his first tour of Europe. Newman is looking for a world different from the simple, harsh realities of 19th-century American business. He encounters both the beauty and the ugliness of Europe, and learns not to take either for granted. The core of the novel concerns Newman's courtship of a young widow from an aristocratic Parisian family.

== Synopsis ==
In May 1868, 35-year-old Christopher Newman, an American expatriate and businessman, visits Europe on a Grand Tour. Having worked for a living since age 10 (interrupted by service in the Union Army during the American Civil War), he has made a large fortune and retired in his thirties, and is now looking to settle down and get married.

At the Louvre in Paris, he watches a painter named Noémie; he offers to buy the copy she is making and meets her father, M. Nioche. About the same time a mutual friend introduces Newman to Claire de Cintré (née de Bellegarde), a young widow. Newman hires M. Nioche to teach him French and the two become friendly; Newman, learning that M. Nioche worries about his daughter's future since he is poor, says that he will buy enough paintings from Noémie to give her a respectable dowry. Meeting Newman at the Louvre the next day, though, Noémie frankly tells him that she has no talent and her paintings are worthless. She scorns the men she could marry even with a dowry, and hints that she would prefer a more exciting life. Newman either doesn't understand the hint or ignores it, and he leaves her to her work. He pays a visit to the Bellegarde estate, where he meets Claire's two brothers: the cheerful Valentin and the aloof Marquis de Bellegarde, who coldly rebuffs him.

Newman and Valentin become good friends, and eventually he tells Valentin that he wishes to marry Claire; Valentin tells Newman that he has his support but he will find it hard going against the class prejudices of the Marquis and his mother, royalist supporters of the Bourbons. Newman proposes to Claire; after hesitating, because her first husband was abusive, Claire says she will consider it.

Newman and Valentin visit the Louvre and find Noémie at work in a gallery. Noémie tells Newman she has finished none of the work she was to do for him, and in irritation she slashes a large red cross over her painting, obliterating it. Afterward Valentin tells Newman that Noémie is certain to become the mistress of some rich man, though Newman objects that her respectable father would never allow it.

Claire's mother tells Newman his "commercial" background makes him unfit, but when he tells her how rich he is, she reluctantly agrees not to oppose him. After some months Claire agrees to marry him, and the Bellegardes have a party in honor of the engagement. Newman hears town gossip that Noémie has become a courtesan; he goes to see M. Nioche, and finds him drinking in misery.

While Newman is occupied with arranging the upcoming wedding, Valentin becomes involved with Noémie. At a theater he exchanges insults with a rival and they agree to a duel; he leaves for Switzerland to fight the duel despite Newman's exasperated attempt to talk him out of it. The next day the Bellegardes tell Newman that the engagement is off, and Claire has been ordered to leave for the family's estate in Poitiers. He hardly has time to digest this when he gets a telegram telling him that Valentin, wounded in his duel, is dying. Newman hurries to Geneva where he sits by Valentin's deathbed. Valentin, ashamed of his family's behavior, tells Newman that the Bellegardes have a terrible secret, which he can discover in Poitiers and use against them. Newman goes to Poitiers to attend Valentin's funeral, and afterwards urges Claire to disobey her family and marry him. Claire cannot stand against her mother and intends to become a Carmelite nun.

Newman discovers the family secret: Claire's mother indirectly murdered the old Marquis, Claire's father, by throwing out his medicine during his illness and keeping doctors away from him until he died. At first, he plans to use the secret against the family but soon decides that that would be beneath him, and he leaves Paris. Walking in Hyde Park in London he sees Noémie, now a successful woman of fashion, flirting with wealthy men as M. Nioche sits forlornly nearby, and he walks away from them in disgust. After restlessly traveling to New York and San Francisco, he hears that Claire has become a nun; he returns to Paris to look at the walls of the convent from the street and then leaves Paris for good, resolving never to think of the Bellegarde family again.

== Major themes ==
The American was popular as one of the first international novels contrasting the rising and forceful New World and the cultured but sinful Old World. James originally conceived the novel as a reply to Alexandre Dumas, fils' play L'Étrangère, which presents Americans as crude and disreputable. While Newman is occasionally too forward or cocksure, his honesty and optimism offer a much more favourable view of America's potential.

== Literary significance and criticism ==
At the time of the novel's serialization in The Atlantic, James rebuffed suggestions from his editor William Dean Howells to give the novel a happy ending with the marriage of Newman and Mme de Cintré. He wrote to Howells that:

"we are each the product of circumstances and there are tall stone walls which fatally divide us. I have written my story from Newman's side of the wall, and I understand so well how Madame de Cintré couldn't really scramble over from her side. If I had represented her as doing so I should have made a prettier ending, certainly; but I should have felt as if I were throwing a rather vulgar sop to readers who don't really know the world and who don't measure the merit of a novel by its correspondence to the same. Such readers assuredly have a right to their entertainment, but I don't believe it is in me to give them, in a satisfactory way, what they require."

When James came to revise the book in 1907 for inclusion in the New York Edition of his fiction, he realised how fanciful much of the plot was. He made enormous revisions in the book to try to make all the goings-on more believable, but he was still forced to confess in his preface that The American remained more of a traditional romance rather than a realistic novel.

Most critics have regretted the New York Edition revisions as unfortunate marrings of the novel's original exuberance and charm. The earlier version of the book has normally been used in modern editions. Critics generally concede that the second half of the novel suffers from improbability but still find the book a vivid and attractive example of James's early style. More recently, some have taken the French characters to task for being obnoxious and imperialistic Europeans. But James' New World hero still finds many supporters, among critics and readers in general.

The American generally flows well and is easily accessible to today's reader, more so than some of James's later novels. Newman's friendship with Valentin de Bellegarde is particularly well drawn, and the descriptions of upper-class Parisian life are vivid.

== Theatrical and TV adaptations ==
Always yearning for success in the theatre, James converted The American to a play in the early 1890s for the British actor-manager Edward Compton. This dramatic version altered the original novel severely, and even ended happily to please theatre-goers. The play was produced in London and other English cities, and enjoyed moderate success.

The Public Broadcasting Service (PBS) produced a television film version of The American in 1998, directed by Paul Unwin and starring Matthew Modine as Christopher Newman, Diana Rigg as Madame de Bellegarde, and Aisling O'Sullivan as Claire De Cintré. Michael Hastings wrote the script, which deviates significantly from James's text, including sexual scenes between Newman and Noémie and between Valentin and Noémie.

== Sources ==
- The American: an Authoritative Text, Backgrounds and Sources, Criticism edited by James Tuttleton (New York: W.W. Norton & Company 1978) ISBN 0-393-09091-4
- The Complete Plays of Henry James edited by Leon Edel (New York: Oxford University Press 1990) ISBN 0-19-504379-0
- Henry James Letters Vol. II: 1875-1883 edited by Leon Edel (Cambridge: Harvard University Press 1975) ISBN 0-674-38781-3
