= The Henry James Review =

- Discipline: Literature
- Language: English
- Edited by: Greg Zacharias

Publication details
- History: 1979-present
- Publisher: Johns Hopkins University Press for the Henry James Society, Creighton University (United States)
- Frequency: Triannually

Standard abbreviations
- ISO 4: Henry James Rev.

Indexing
- ISSN: 0273-0340 (print); 1080-6555 (web)
- LCCN: 80648614
- OCLC no.: 860371909

Links
- Journal homepage; Online access at Project MUSE

The Henry James Review is a triannual peer-reviewed academic journal established in 1979 and is the official publication of the Henry James Society part of The Center for Henry James Studies at Creighton University. It is dedicated to the scholarly, critical, and theoretical study of the American writer Henry James. Each issue focuses on a specific theme of interest and seeks to promote understanding and study of James' contributions. The journal is published by the Johns Hopkins University Press and the current editor-in-chief is Greg W. Zacharias (Creighton University).
