= The Princess Casamassima =

1886 novel by Henry James

- First edition
- Author: Henry James
- Language: English
- Publisher: Macmillan and Co., London
- Publication date: 23 November 1886
- Publication place: United Kingdom
- Media type: Print (Hardback & Paperback)
- Pages: Volume one, 252; volume two, 257; volume three, 242

The Princess Casamassima is a novel by Henry James, first published as a serial in The Atlantic Monthly in 1885 and 1886 and then as a book in 1886. It is the story of an intelligent but confused young London bookbinder, Hyacinth Robinson, who becomes involved in radical politics and a terrorist assassination plot. The book is unusual in the Jamesian canon for dealing with such a violent political subject. But it is often paired with another novel published by James in the same year, The Bostonians, which is also concerned with political issues, though in a much less tragic manner.

== Synopsis ==
Amanda Pynsent, an impoverished seamstress, has adopted Hyacinth Robinson, the illegitimate son of her old friend Florentine Vivier, a French woman of less than sterling repute, and an English lord. Florentine had stabbed her lover to death several years ago, and Pinnie (as Miss Pynsent is nicknamed) takes Hyacinth to see her as she lies dying at Millbank prison. Hyacinth eventually learns that the dying woman is his mother and that she murdered his father.

Many years pass. Hyacinth, now a young man and a skilled bookbinder, meets revolutionary Paul Muniment and gets involved in radical politics. Hyacinth also has a coarse but lively girlfriend, Millicent Henning, and one night they go to the theatre. There Hyacinth meets the radiantly beautiful Princess Casamassima (Christina Light, from James' earlier novel, Roderick Hudson).

The Princess has become a revolutionary herself and now lives apart from her dull husband. Meanwhile, Hyacinth has committed himself to carrying out a terrorist assassination, though the exact time and place have not yet been specified to him. Hyacinth visits the Princess at her country home and tells her about his parents. When he returns to London, Hyacinth finds Pinnie dying. He comforts her in her final days, then travels to France and Italy on his small inheritance.

This trip completes Hyacinth's conversion to a love for the sinful but beautiful world, and away from violent revolution. Still, he does not attempt to escape his vow to carry out the assassination. But when the order comes, he turns the gun on himself instead of its intended victim.

== Characters ==
- Hyacinth Robinson, the illegitimate son of Lord Frederick Purvis. He works as a bookbinder and ultimately joins the anarchist movement
- Christina Light, the Princess Casamassima a revolutionary who appeared in Henry James' previous novel Roderick Hudson. She is thought to have been based on Elena Lowe, a woman James met in Rome in 1873.
- Amanda 'Pinnie' Pynsent, a seamstress who serves as the devoted guardian to Robinson
- Paul Muniment, a tough-minded anarchist
- Rosy Muniment, the invalid sister of Paul Muniment
- Lady Aurora Langrish, an philanthropic aristocrat who is friends with Muniment
- Millicent Henning, the girlfriend of Robinson who is warm but fickle
- Captain Godfrey Sholto, the attendant of Princess Casamassima
- Prince Gennaro Casamassima, Christina Light's husband who married her at the end of Roderick Hudson
- Madame Grandoni, a friend of Christina Light who appeared in Roderick Hudson
- Diedrich Hoffendahl, a shadowy figure who leads the anarchist movement in Europe

== Themes ==
At first glance, the novel seems very different from James' usual work because of its concentration on radical politics and less-than-wealthy characters. But the novel also explores themes familiar from James' other works. Just as in The Bostonians, which was published in the same year, the novel concerns a group with a specific purpose- in this case, anarchists- who aim to make use of a talented but naïve individual. In the same way that The Bostonians revolves around various characters attempting to win the loyalty of Verena Tarrant, so too does The Princess Casamassima focus on Hyacinth Robinson, and his involvement in complex politics.

Hyacinth finds himself in a difficult position, torn between the differing claims of elite culture and of socio-political justice for the poor, claims that he associates with his aristocratic father and his impoverished mother. He is attracted to the beauty of the world, but can't enjoy it completely because he sees how it is purchased at the cost of so much human suffering. The aristocracy is portrayed as corrupt, artificial, and extravagant; the anarchists, meanwhile, are ineffectual or power-hungry. Such hesitations and divided loyalties are common among James' perceptive central characters.

The novel shows a broad panorama of European life at all levels, and the many supporting characters are presented with a generous helping of humour in a story which shows the influence of Dickens and Thackeray from James' early reading.

== Reception ==
The Guardian's review, published in 1887, noted that The Princess Casamassima kept to the promise of Roderick Hudson, which James's other novels had not met. The review praised James's characterisation of Hyacinth's friends and comrades, but nonetheless found that James "does not understand" the English, with the result that his characters are "rather extremely clever attempts and conjectures than real life studies." The review concluded: "there is a great deal of interest in the book, interest which is not lessened by the fact that its catastrophe is quite unexpected, or rather is one which most readers are likely not to expect, exactly because it is so obvious."

== Adaptations ==
=== Radio ===
In 1956, Mary Hope Allen's three-part radio adaptation was broadcast by the BBC.

=== Stage ===
Frank J. Morlock's dramatic adaptation of the same name was published in 2012.

== In popular culture ==
A vampiric incarnation of Christina Light features prominently in Kim Newman's Anno Dracula series. She appears alongside Paul Muniment in Anno Dracula 1895: Seven Days of Mayhem (2017), where she is a member of an anarchist council taken from G.K. Chesterton's The Man Who Was Thursday. She also features as a major character in Anno Dracula 1899: One Thousand Monsters (2017), where she is one of several vampires seeking sanctuary in Japan, and as a supporting antagonist in Anno Dracula 1999: Daikaiju (2019). Newman has referred to this series of novels as 'the Christina Light trilogy'.
