= Notebooks of Henry James =

Private notes by Henry James

Notebooks of Henry James edited by Leon Edel and Lyall Powers, Oxford University Press edition 1987

Notebooks of Henry James edited by F. O. Matthiessen and Kenneth Murdock, First edition 1947

The Notebooks of Henry James are private notes made by the American-British novelist and critic. Usually the notes are of a professional nature and concern ideas for possible or ongoing fictions, but there are a number of personal notes as well. James made entries in the Notebooks throughout most of his career. The notes were first published posthumously in 1947, in an annotated edition compiled by F. O. Matthiessen and Kenneth Murdock. The novelist Graham Greene ranked it with the G. H. Hardy's A Mathematician's Apology as "the best account of what it was like to be a creative artist."

== Publication history ==
The Notebooks weren't published until 1947, when they appeared in a heavily annotated edition compiled by F. O. Matthiessen and Kenneth Murdock. The editors pointed out notebook entries that eventually turned into finished works by James, and then went beyond that simple editorial function to discuss and evaluate the works themselves.

Some objected to such critical commentary, while others accepted it as the editors' opinion and nothing more. In 1987 Leon Edel and Lyall Powers published another edition of the Notebooks that eliminated critical commentary on James' finished works, and added substantial new material from other, less formal notes written by James. The new edition also cleared up some obscure references to people mentioned in the Notebooks.

== Notebook contents ==
For those interested in the planning and writing of fictional narratives, the Notebooks are of substantial value. They show James thinking through various possibilities for character and plot development in his fictions, as well as their overall structure and length. James himself seems to have referred to the Notebooks frequently when he wrote the prefaces to the New York Edition (1907-1909) of his fiction.

Occasionally the Notebooks feature encouraging comments by James to himself. A famous example is his brief but emotional note after the failure of his play, Guy Domville. The later Edel-Powers edition includes many more personal notes. Though sometimes trivial, this additional material gives some insight into James' everyday schedule, his wide circle of friends and acquaintances, and even his financial affairs.
