= Roderick Hudson =

1875 novel by Henry James

- First UK edition (1879)
- Author: Henry James
- Language: English
- Genre: Novel of manners, bildungsroman
- Publisher: James R. Osgood and Company, Boston (US), Macmillan & Co. (UK)
- Publication date: 6 December 1875
- Publication place: United States
- Media type: Print (Hardback & Paperback)
- Pages: 482
- Preceded by: Watch and Ward
- Followed by: The American

Roderick Hudson is a novel by Henry James. Originally published between January and December 1875 as a serial in The Atlantic Monthly, it is a bildungsroman that traces the development of the title character, a sculptor.

== Synopsis ==
Rowland Mallet, a wealthy bachelor and art connoiseur from Boston, visits his cousin Cecilia in Northampton, Massachusetts, before leaving for Europe. There he sees a Grecian figure he thinks is a remarkable work of art. Cecilia introduces him to the local sculptor, Roderick Hudson, a young law student who sculpts in his spare time. Rowland—who loves art but is without artistic talent himself—sees an opportunity to contribute: he offers to advance Roderick a sum of money against future works which will allow Roderick to join him in moving to Italy for two years. Rowland believes that in Rome, Roderick will be exposed to the kind of artistic influences which will allow his natural talent to fully mature. Roderick is galvanized by the offer, but he fears his highly protective mother's disapproval and urges Rowland to meet with and reassure her. Rowland does so, eventually overcoming the woman's doubts. At the meeting, Rowland is also introduced to Mary Garland, a distant poor cousin of the Hudsons who has been living with them as a companion to Mrs. Hudson. Rowland finds himself unexpectedly attracted to the young woman—to her simplicity, her lack of affectation, her honesty. During a farewell picnic attended by many of the Hudsons' friends and family, Rowland realizes he has fallen in love for the first time in his life. But, because of his natural reserve and imminent departure for two years, he fails to declare his feelings, yet still harbors hopes that something may yet come of the relationship.

That hope is crushed when, on the voyage across the Atlantic, Roderick reveals that just before leaving he asked Miss Garland to marry him and she accepted. "...You came and put me into such ridiculous good-humor," Roderick tells Rowland, "that I felt an extraordinary desire to tell some woman that I adored her." Rowland listens to all this with the feeling that fortune has played an elaborately devised trick on him; that just as he had finally found love, it had been stolen away because of his own act of generosity.

After a rough start in Rome, Roderick begins to flourish in the arts community, building a reputation as an original talent and a charming, if ill-mannered, character. Meanwhile, Rowland attempts to suppress his feelings for Mary Garland by cultivating a relationship with Augusta Blanchard, another expatriate American artist living in Italy. When Roderick decides to visit Switzerland or Germany, Rowland travels with him part way before going on to visit friends in England. There Rowland writes to Mrs. Hudson to inform her of the situation. She replies saying she is pleased the situation has gone so well. However, when Rowland finally hears from Roderick, he begs him for money to cover the debts he incurred while gambling at Baden-Baden.

The two men return to Rome where, one fateful day, Christina Light enters Roderick's studio to peruse his artwork. Christina has grown up on the Continent, tended by her ambitious mother and the mother's aging Italian escort, the Cavaliere. She is, by general agreement, one of the most startlingly beautiful young women in Europe, and her mother is determined to marry Christina to a wealthy and titled gentleman. The impoverished Roderick is nonetheless instantly infatuated with Christina, eventually obtaining approval to sculpt her bust and thereby ingratiating himself with the family. Although the prematurely world-weary Christina is slow to show her feelings for Roderick, she comes increasingly to be attracted to him and to his status as an artistic "genius". Rowland finds himself in a wrenching emotional bind – attempting to prevent Roderick from consummating his love with Christina so as to protect Mary Garland from emotional injury; knowing all the while that doing so will foreclose forever any possibility that he himself can marry the only woman he has ever loved.

Later Rowland encounters Christina and Roderick at the Colosseum. He saves Roderick from falling to his death attempting to pick an out-of-reach flower for Christina. Rowland subsequently happens to meet Christina at the church of St. Cecilia, and when he discovers that the relationship between Roderick and Christina is more serious than he had thought, urges her to give up her flirtation with Roderick.

Rowland writes a letter to Cecilia about Roderick's fall. Later Roderick decides not to complete his sculpture for Mr. Leavenworth, leading Rowland to be annoyed with him. Rowland visits Madame Grandoni and meets Christina there. He then decides to leave for Florence, but decides to make up with Roderick and bring his mother and his betrothed over to Italy to save him. While doing some sightseeing, Miss Garland admits to being afraid of changing. They walk into Christina and Roderick says she might not marry the Prince after all.

Roderick then does a sculpture of his mother. Mrs. Hudson thinks she owes something to Rowland for all he has done. Upon completing the bust, Roderick says he will not marry Miss Garland. Rowland and Gloriani witness another of Roderick's tantrums. Later, Mrs. Grandoni says Miss Blanchard is marrying Mr. Leavenworth, although she is in love with Rowland. She then throws a party and Christina turns up uninvited to observe Miss Garland and be vituperative. The next day the latter admits she takes Christina to be fake. Later after the Prince has left, the Cavaliere visits Rowland and entreats him to advise Christina, as she has no father to turn to. After checking on Roderick because his mother has received a note from him saying he didn't want to be disturbed, he goes to the Lights' and talks to Christina. She says she doesn't like the Prince but likes Roderick as a friend. She has however married the Prince...

Roderick admits to his mother he is unable to work and is crippled with debts. Upon Rowland's counsel, they move to cheaper accommodation in Florence. When his morale isn't improving, his mother suggests moving back to Northampton, Massachusetts. Instead, Rowland persuades them to move to Switzerland. There, he seems a little closer to Miss Garland; Rowland asks him about Christina, but he avoids the question. Later, they walk into Sam; then Rowland chances upon Christina and the Prince; Roderick comes along and he is stupefied with her beauty. He then wants to join her in Interlaken as she has asked of him. He begs Rowland, his mother, and Miss Garland for money. Rowland admits that he is in love with Miss Garland. Finally, Roderick dies in a storm while on his way to Interlaken; Rowland and Sam find his corpse the next day. Mrs. Hudson and Miss Garland return to Massachusetts.

== Characters ==
- Rowland Mallet a wealthy Bostonian bachelor and art connoisseur.
- Cecilia, Rowland's cousin. She is the widow of a nephew of Rowland's father. She has lost her fortune and lives in Northampton, Massachusetts.
- Roderick Hudson, a law student in Northampton, Massachusetts, sculptor by hobby.
- Mrs. Hudson, Roderick's mother.
- Stephen Hudson, Roderick's brother. Died in the U.S. Civil War and is only mentioned a few times in the novel.
- Miss Mary Garland a distant poor cousin of the Hudsons who has been living with them as a companion to Mrs. Hudson. Rowland finds himself unexpectedly attracted to the young woman—to her simplicity, her lack of affectation, and her honesty.
- Mr. Striker, an attorney who lent books to Roderick when he was studying law.
- Mrs. Striker, Mr. Striker's wife.
- Miss Petronilla Striker, the Strikers' daughter.
- Mrs. Light, Christina Light's mother.
- Miss Christina Light, later the Princess Casamassima. A beautiful American woman with whom Roderick Hudson falls in love.
- The Cavaliere, Mrs. Light's companion, a somewhat mysterious Italian.
- Gloriani, an Italian sculptor whose work Roderick despises. He is in his forties.
- Sam Singleton, an American painter and a friend of Rowland's.
- Miss Augusta Blanchard, a friend of Rowland's. She is American, young and pretty.
- Madame Grandoni, Miss Blanchard's neighbour.
- Prince Casamassima, a rich Neapolitan.
- Mr. Leavenworth, a gentleman who made money in Midwestern borax mines. He is a friend of Miss Blanchard's, and eventually affianced to her.

== Allusions to other works ==
- Other writers and works mentioned are: Greek mythology (Hylas, Narcissus, Paris, Endymion, Juno, Olympus, Apollo, Phidias, Praxiteles, Hero, Aphrodite, Venus, Mercury, Bacchus, Medusa, Niobe), Faust, the Bible (Adam and Eve, David, Judas), William Makepeace Thackeray, Honoré de Balzac, Charles Dickens's Oliver Twist, Samuel Taylor Coleridge's The Rime of the Ancient Mariner, Ludovico Ariosto, Dante's Inferno, Alfred Tennyson, Stendhal, Jean Charles Léonard de Sismondi's The History of the Italian Republics in the Middle Ages, William Shakespeare's Romeo and Juliet, William Wordsworth, Homer.
- Writers and works from the visual arts mentioned are: Domenico Ghirlandaio, Sandro Botticelli, Guercino, Michelangelo, Titian, Paolo Veronese, Antonio Canova, Johann Friedrich Overbeck, Fra Angelico, Giovanni Battista Salvi da Sassoferrato, Pinturicchio, the Dying Gladiator, Raphael, Gian Lorenzo Bernini.

== Place in James's oeuvre ==
The first book publication was in 1876, and a second edition was published in 1879. In 1907 James revised the book extensively for the New York Edition of his fiction. His preface to the revised version harshly criticized some aspects of the novel. James felt that the time-scheme of the book was too short and that certain plot elements strained credulity.

James brought back Christina Light as the title character of his 1886 novel The Princess Casamassima. He confessed in the preface that Christina was too fascinating a character to be dropped after only one appearance.
