= What Maisie Knew =

1897 novel by Henry James

- First edition (UK)
- Author: Henry James
- Language: English
- Genre: Novel
- Publisher: William Heinemann, London; Herbert S. Stone, Chicago
- Publication date: 18 September 1897 (Heinemann); 17 October 1897 (Stone)
- Publication place: United Kingdom; United States
- Media type: Print (Serialized)
- Pages: 304 pp (Heinemann); 470 pp (Stone)

What Maisie Knew is a novel by Henry James, first published as a serial in The Chap-Book and (revised and abridged) in the New Review in 1897 and then as a book later that year. It tells the story of Maisie Farange, the sensitive daughter of divorced, irresponsible, narcissistic, vindictive, and vile parents, Beale and Ida Farange. The book follows the title character from earliest childhood to precocious maturity.

== Synopsis ==
When Beale and Ida Farange divorce, the court decrees that their only child, the very young Maisie, will shuttle back and forth between them, spending six months of the year with each. The parents are immoral and frivolous, and they use Maisie to spite each other. Beale Farange marries Miss Overmore, Maisie's pretty governess, while Ida marries the likeable but weak Sir Claude. Maisie gets a new governess: the frumpy, somewhat ridiculous, but devoted Mrs. Wix.

Both Ida and Beale are soon unfaithful to their spouses; in turn, Sir Claude and the new Mrs. Farange begin an affair with each other. Maisie's parents abandon her and she becomes largely the responsibility of Sir Claude. Eventually, Maisie must decide if she wants to remain with Sir Claude and Mrs. Farange. In the book's long final section, set in France, the older (probably teenaged) Maisie struggles to choose between them and Mrs. Wix, and concludes that her new parents' relationship will likely end as her biological parents' did. She leaves them and goes to stay with Mrs. Wix, her most reliable adult guardian.

== Literary significance and criticism ==
What Maisie Knew has attained a fairly strong critical position in James's canon. Edmund Wilson was one of many critics who admired both the book's technical proficiency and its judgment of a negligent and damaged society. When Wilson recommended What Maisie Knew to Vladimir Nabokov, the author of Lolita, Nabokov said he thought the book was terrible. F. R. Leavis, on the other hand, declared the book to be "perfection". The psychoanalytic critic Neil Hertz has argued for a parallel between James' narrative voice and the problem of transference in Freud's Dora case.

A film adaptation was released in 2012, directed by Scott McGehee and David Siegel, and starring Julianne Moore, Alexander Skarsgård, and Onata Aprile. It is based largely on James' plot, with some alterations. The film is set in present-day New York City, and the professions of Maisie's parents are changed. Unlike in the book, Maisie's step parents are highly dependable and love her and each other deeply. Maisie finds a happy life with them, and the character of Mrs. Wix is virtually eliminated.

== Themes ==
A major theme of the novel is that of childhood innocence. Despite the dissolute and morally corrupt nature of her parents, the eponymous Maisie Farange retains an innocent perception of respect and love; she is an incorruptible figure in a corrupt world. The adults around her are presented as casually cruel and sadistic, but Maisie is nevertheless able to extract proper moral lessons from them. The title's reference to "What Maisie Knew" refers to a performative creation of a pure world distinct from her unpleasant surroundings; in the end, Maisie's innocence triumphs over the depravity of those around her.

== Bibliography ==
- Cargill, Oscar (1961). The Novels of Henry James. New York: Macmillan. ISBN 978-0-02-842540-5.
- Jeffers, Thomas L. (2005). Apprenticeships: The Bildungsroman from Goethe to Santayana. New York: Palgrave. pp. 89–118. ISBN 1-4039-6607-9.
- Wagenknecht, Edward (1983). The Novels of Henry James. New York: Frederick Ungar Publishing Co. ISBN 0-8044-2959-6.
