= The Wings of the Dove =

1902 novel by Henry James

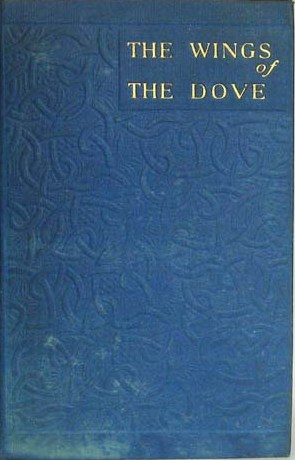
- Cover of the first UK edition
- Author: Henry James
- Language: English
- Publisher: Archibald Constable & Co., London; Charles Scribner's Sons, New York City
- Publication date: Constable: 8 September 1902; Scribner's: 26 August 1902
- Publication place: United Kingdom, United States
- Media type: Print
- Pages: Constable: 576; Scribner's: volume one, 329; volume two, 439
- OCLC: 25895745

The Wings of the Dove is a 1902 novel by Henry James. It tells the story of Milly Theale, an American heiress stricken with a serious disease, and her effect on the people around her. Some of these people befriend Milly with honourable motives, while others are more self-interested.

== Synopsis ==
Kate Croy and Merton Densher are two betrothed Londoners who desperately want to marry but have little money. Kate is constantly put upon by family troubles, and is now living with her domineering aunt, Maud Lowder. Into their world comes Milly Theale, an enormously rich young American woman who had previously met and fallen in love with Densher, although she has never revealed her feelings. Her travelling companion and confidante, Mrs. Stringham, is an old friend of Maud. Kate and Aunt Maud welcome Milly to London, and the American heiress enjoys great social success.

With Kate as a companion, Milly goes to see an eminent physician, Sir Luke Strett, because she worries that she is suffering from an incurable disease. The doctor is noncommittal but Milly fears the worst. Kate suspects that Milly is deathly ill. After the trip to America where he had met Milly, Densher returns to find the heiress in London. Kate wants Densher to pay as much attention as possible to Milly, though at first he doesn't quite know why. Kate has been careful to conceal from Milly (and everybody else) that she and Densher are engaged.

With the threat of serious illness hanging over her, Milly decides to travel to Venice with Mrs. Stringham. Aunt Maud, Kate, and Densher follow her. At a party Milly gives in her Venice palazzo (the older Palazzo Barbaro, called "Palazzo Leporelli" in the novel), Kate finally reveals her complete plan to Densher: he is to marry Milly so that, after her presumably soon-to-occur death, he will inherit her money, enabling them to marry. Densher had suspected this was Kate's idea, and he demands that she consummate their affair before he will go along with her plan.

Aunt Maud and Kate return to London while Densher remains with Milly. Unfortunately, the dying girl learns from a former suitor of Kate's about the plot to get her money. She withdraws from Densher and her condition deteriorates. Densher sees her one last time before he leaves for London, where he eventually receives news of Milly's death. Milly does leave him a large amount of money despite everything. But Densher does not accept the money, and he will not marry Kate unless she also refuses the bequest. Conversely, if Kate chooses the money instead of him, Densher offers to make the bequest over to her in full. The lovers part on the novel's final page with a cryptic exclamation from Kate: "We shall never be again as we were!"

== Inspiration ==
James based the character Milly on Minny Temple (1845–1870), his beloved cousin who died from tuberculosis. In his autobiography James wrote of The Wings of the Dove as his attempt to wrap her dying in the "beauty and dignity of art". He also said in the preface to the New York Edition text of the novel, that he had to prepare the situation that was to occupy Milly for the last months of her life; he established the background of Kate and Densher's inability to marry due to a lack of money.

Though the image of a dove has traditional associations with love and peaceful harmony, specific reference to a dove's wings may connote wealth or money: "Though you lie down among the sheepfolds, the wings of the dove are covered with silver, and her feathers with shimmering gold." (Psalm 68:13)

The premise of the novel is founded on that of French writer Edmond About's 1857 novel, Germaine.

== Literary significance and criticism ==
The Wings of the Dove holds one of the most esteemed critical positions of any of James' works, although James himself sometimes expressed dissatisfaction with it. In his preface to the New York Edition, James spent much time confessing to supposed faults in the novel: defective structure, characters not as well presented as they could be, and a general failure to realise his initial plan for the book.

By and large, critics have regarded these faults as venial or nonexistent. Instead, they have concentrated on the central characters and supporting cast, and the technique that James uses in their presentation. Drawing on Eve Kosofsky Sedgwick's work, critic Rachel Haines has commented on lesbian themes in the novel—what Haines calls its "queer metaphorics of influence and impressibility"—incarnate in desire between Milly, Kate, and Susan (Mrs. Stringham).

In 1998, the Modern Library ranked The Wings of the Dove 26th on its list of the 100 best English-language novels of the 20th century.

== Theatrical, television, and film adaptations ==
The first television production of The Wings of the Dove, presented in 1952 on Westinghouse Studio One on CBS, was directed by Franklin J. Schaffner and featured Charlton Heston in one of his earlier roles as Merton Densher. It was adapted for television again in 1959, when it was presented on Playhouse 90, also by CBS. It starred Dana Wynter as Kate Croy. Merton Densher, played by James Donald, was renamed Miles Denshaw for this version.

Playwright Guy Bolton adapted the novel for Broadway as Child of Fortune in 1956. It played a total of 23 performances, opening 13 November 1956 and closing less than three weeks later on 1 December. It starred Mildred Dunnock as Susan Shepherd, Norah Howard as Mrs. Lowder, Edmund Purdom as Richard Denning (Merton Densher in the novel), Pippa Scott as Milly Temple (Theale in the novel), and Betsy von Furstenberg as Kate Croy. It played the Royale Theatre (now the Jacobs Theatre) and was directed by Jed Harris.

Composer Douglas Moore adapted the work into an opera which was given its premiere at the New York City Opera on 12 October 1961 with Regina Sarfaty as Kate Croy.

Christopher Taylor adapted the work into a play for the West End's Lyric Theatre, London in 1963. Directed by Frith Banbury, it starred Gene Anderson as Kate Croy, Susannah York as Milly Theale, Wendy Hiller as Susan Shepherd, Elspeth March as Maud Lowder, and James Donald as Merton Densher.

It was again adapted as a television play by the BBC in 1965, directed by Rudolph Cartier. Another TV adaptation occurred in 1979 starring John Castle and Suzanne Bertish.

The Wings of the Dove has been made into theatrical films three times, first in 1981, again in 1997, and lastly in 1998. Iain Softley directed the 1997 adaptation starring Helena Bonham Carter as Kate Croy, Alison Elliott as Milly Theale, and Linus Roache as Merton Densher. The film received mostly favourable reviews, and fared well at the box office. Bonham Carter received an Academy Award nomination for Best Actress. In 1998, the story was adapted into a modernized version for the film Under Heaven. In this version, the story is transplanted from London to Seattle.
