= Edward Wagenknecht =

American literary critic and teacher

Edward (Charles) Wagenknecht (March 28, 1900 – May 24, 2004) was an American literary critic and teacher who specialized in 19th-century American literature. He wrote and edited many books on literature and movies, and taught for many years at various universities, including the University of Chicago and Boston University. He also contributed many book reviews and other writings to such newspapers as the Boston Herald, The New York Times and the Chicago Tribune, and to such magazines as The Yale Review and The Atlantic Monthly.

== Life ==
Wagenknecht was born in Chicago to Henry E. and Mary F. (Erichson) Wagenknecht, and grew up and went to school in Oak Park, Illinois. He was attracted from an early age to various art forms: theater, opera, movies, and the Oz novels of L. Frank Baum. He was particularly interested in the writings of critic Gamaliel Bradford, who immersed himself in the life and works of an author and then wrote what he called a "psychography" about the writer.

Wagenknecht received his Ph.D. from the University of Washington in 1932. His doctoral dissertation was a Bradford-like psychograph, Charles Dickens: A Victorian Portrait. In the same year when he was awarded his Ph.D., Wagenknecht married Dorothy Arnold; the couple had three sons.

Wagenknecht spent a long career teaching at a number of schools: University of Chicago (1923–25), University of Washington (1925–1943), Illinois Institute of Technology (1943–1947), Boston University (1947–1965), and the extension division of Harvard University (1965–1972). His style of teaching was rigorous and traditional, and he challenged his students with tough examinations.

Throughout his teaching career and beyond, Wagenknecht wrote on his great loves of literature and film. Perhaps his best known books are Cavalcade of the English Novel (1943, second edition 1954) and Cavalcade of the American Novel (1952). A thinker of broad range, Wagenknecht wrote or edited books on Henry James, Marilyn Monroe, Lillian Gish, John Milton, Geoffrey Chaucer, Jenny Lind, and Theodore Roosevelt. His first publication appeared in 1927; his last in 1994. He even wrote novels (under the pseudonym Julian Forrest) about Joan of Arc and Mary, Queen of Scots. The list of his books includes more than sixty titles.

After his retirement from teaching, Wagenknecht stayed active as a writer into his nineties. A review of one of his books described him as a Jamesian hero, which is appropriate because he wrote three books on Henry James and personified the intelligence, perception and decency that James prized.

== Criticism ==
The Novels of Henry James by Edward Wagenknecht (1983)

Wagenknecht practiced a form of criticism pioneered by French critic Charles Augustin Sainte-Beuve and taken up by Gamaliel Bradford. He would explore the full range of a writer's works, then form an overall picture of the writer's point of view and technique. He was particularly interested in characterization, style, and moral issues. He favored the Jamesian well-made novel but made an effort to be open to other types of writing, such as stream-of-consciousness works. He is cited in Jack Green's book Fire the Bastards! as one of the many book reviewers who ought to lose his job for not perceiving the merits and importance of William Gaddis' first novel, The Recognitions.

Writing in the Dictionary of Literary Biography, Herbert F. Smith commented: "The critical and biographical writing of Edward Wagenknecht represents the epitome of a style of subjective criticism which began with the nineteenth-century critic Charles Augustin Sainte-Beuve." Wagenknecht himself pointed out his debt to Bradford and Sainte-Beuve:

My specialty as a writer was the psychograph or character portrait, which I learned from Gamaliel Bradford, who, in turn, had been inspired by Sainte-Beuve. Bradford furnished an introduction to my first book of consequence, The Man Charles Dickens: A Victorian Portrait, and in fact placed it with Houghton Mifflin Co. I use the psychographic method in all my books which deal with individuals."

He also produced an enormous amount of film criticism, much of it before the movies became a fashionable subject of academic attention. He enjoyed writing about women artists in both literature and film, although it would be hard to call his viewpoint a feminist one. He was more courtly in his approach to the women he wrote about.

Above all, Wagenknecht was a completely professional writer who always had an eye on publication. In his memoir As Far as Yesterday (1968) he wrote:

Though I have always written to please myself first of all, I have never been bashful about wooing the printing press, and I began sending my things out very early. For a long time, of course, they all came back, but in the long run nothing that was publishable failed of publication, though, except for book reviews, I have always been more successful with book publishers than with magazine editors. Here, again, I am sure my irrefragable independence has been the root cause. Magazine editors have 'policies' and 'interests.' So have I, and I have never considered dropping mine to take up those of somebody else.

== Selected works ==
Lillian Gish: An Interpretation (1927); Utopia Americana (1929); The Man Charles Dickens: A Victorian Portrait (1929); A Guide to Bernard Shaw (1929); Jenny Lind (1931); Mark Twain: The Man and His Work (1935); Cavalcade of the English Novel (1942); Six Novels of the Supernatural (editor, 1944); The Fireside Book of Christmas Stories (1945); The Fireside Book of Ghost Stories (1947); The Fireside Book of Romance (1948); Cavalcade of the American Novel (1952); Longfellow: A Full-Length Portrait (1955); The Seven Worlds of Theodore Roosevelt (1958); Chaucer: Modern Essays in Criticism (editor, 1959); Nathaniel Hawthorne: Man and Writer (1961); Washington Irving: Moderation Displayed (1962); The Movies in the Age of Innocence (1962); Edgar Allan Poe: The Man Behind the Legend (1963); Seven Daughters of the Theater (1964); Harriet Beecher Stowe: The Known and the Unknown (1965); Henry Wadsworth Longfellow: Portrait of an American Humanist (1966); Fotheringay: A Novel about Mary, Queen of Scots (1966); John Greenleaf Whittier: A Portrait in Paradox (1967)	As Far as Yesterday: Memories and Reflections (1968); The Personality of Chaucer (1968); The Glory of the Lilies: A Novel about Joan of Arc (1969); Marilyn Monroe: A Composite View (editor, 1969); William Dean Howells: The Friendly Eye (1970); The Personality of Milton (1970); James Russell Lowell: Portrait of a Man-Sided Man (1971); Ambassadors for Christ: Seven American Preachers (1971); Ralph Waldo Emerson: Portrait of a Balanced Soul (1974); The Personality of Shakespeare (1972); The Films of D. W. Griffith (1975) (co-authored by Anthony Slide); Eve and Henry James: Portraits of Women and Girls in His Fiction (1978); What Manner of Man? Henry David Thoreau (1981); American Profile 1900–1909 (1982); Daughters of the Covenant (1983); The Novels of Henry James (1983); The Tales of Henry James (1984); Stars of the Silents (1987); Sir Walter Scott (1991); Willa Cather (1994)
