= Theodora Bosanquet =

British writer and editor (1880–1961)

Theodora Bosanquet MBE
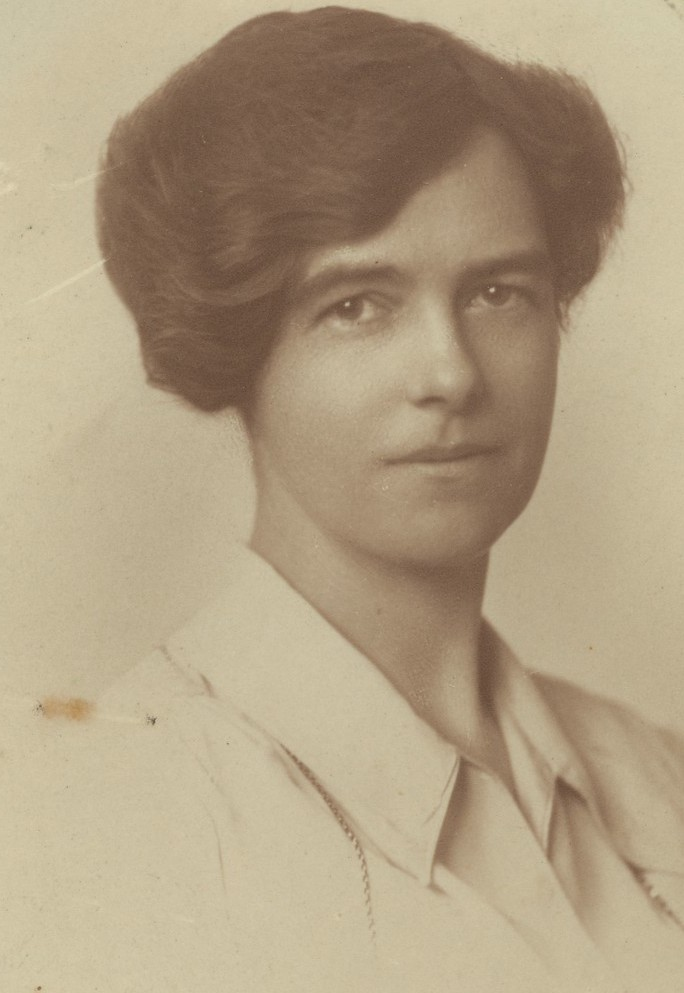
- Born: 3 October 1880; Sandown, Isle of Wight
- Died: 1 June 1961 (aged 80); Chelsea, London
- Education: Cheltenham Ladies’ College (1996–1998), University College London
- Occupations: Writer; reviewer; editor; secretary; amanuensis
- Employer: Time and Tide
- Organization: International Federation of University Women
- Known for: Being amanuensis to novelist Henry James
- Partner: Lady Margaret Rhondda

Theodora Bosanquet MBE (3 October 1880 – 1 June 1961) was a writer, reviewer, editor, secretary, and amanuensis to Henry James. She worked as Executive Secretary of the International Federation of University Women, as well as being a contributor to, and subsequently director and literary editor of, the political and literary magazine Time and Tide. Her memoir, Henry James at Work (1924) is viewed today as "a pioneer work of critical biography".

== Early life ==
Theodora Bosanquet was born on 3 October 1880 at Sandown, Isle of Wight to Gertrude Mary Fox (1854–1900) and Frederick Charles Tindal Bosanquet (1847–1928), a curate. Her family called her "Dora". She was educated at Cheltenham Ladies' College, one of England's earliest educational institutions for women, founded in 1853. She then gained her BSc from University College London, having studied biology, geology, and physics. In 1907, Bosanquet enrolled at Mary Petherbridge's Secretarial Bureau, learning skills including typing and shorthand.

== Henry James (1907-1916) and wartime ==
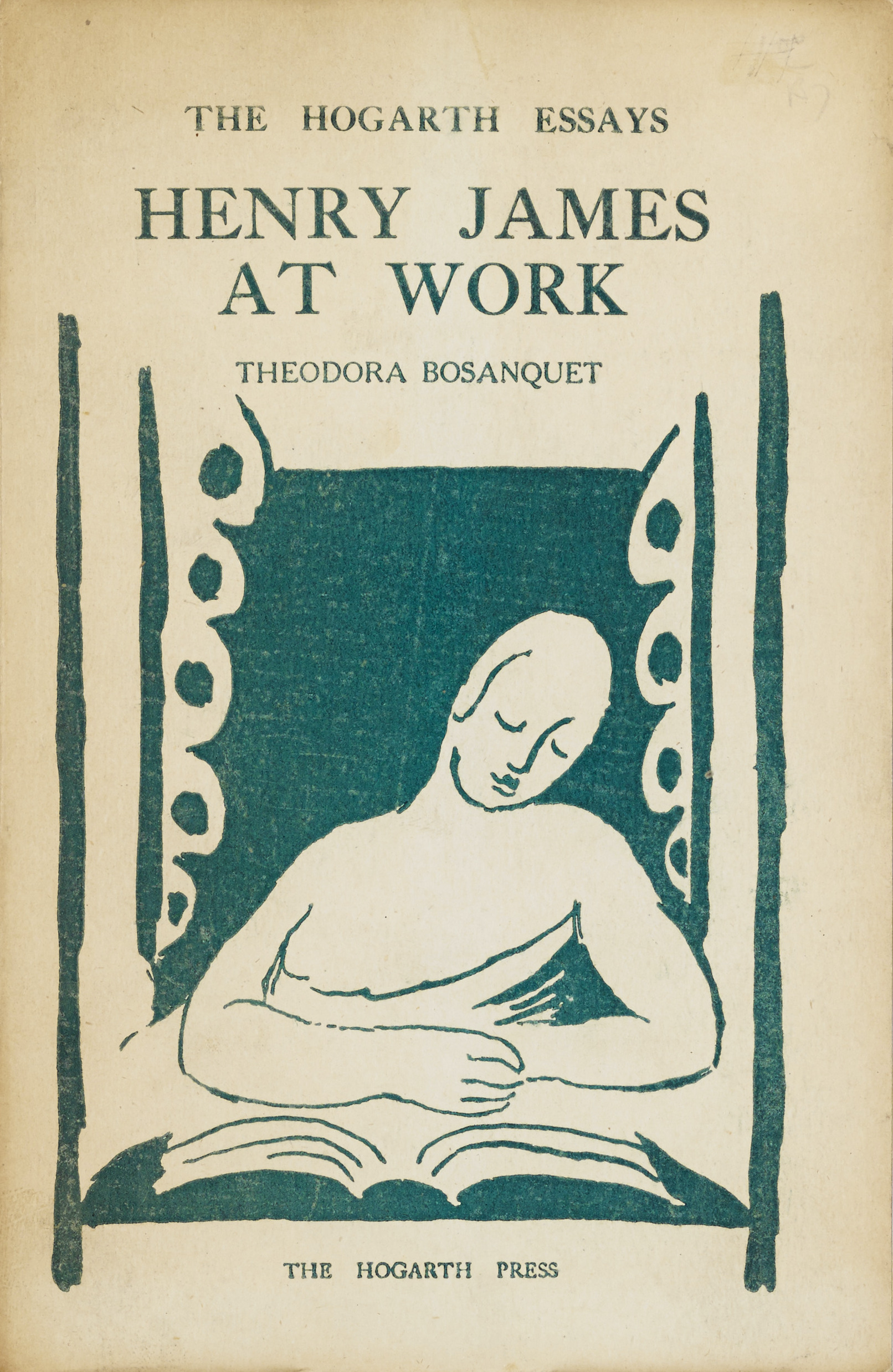
Henry James at Work (1924)

In October 1907, shortly after her 27th birthday, Bosanquet began work for Henry James. His request had been for someone to transcribe edits and additions to his substantial body of work, James having undertaken a revision of his writings for the twenty-four-volume New York Edition. Bosanquet was an admirer of James's work, and had been introduced to his writings as a pre-teenager. She became a loyal amanuensis or, as James once referred to her, his 'Remington priestess', remaining with him until his death in 1916. A week after she had started in the role, James wrote to his brother William to describe:

a new excellent amanuensis... a young boyish Miss Bosanquet, who is worth all the other (females) that I have had put together... There is no comparison!

As James's health ailed during the last months of his life, Bosanquet remained loyal, including keeping the novelist's friends updated on his health. With the arrival of William James's wife and daughter, however, she and others were kept away from James. Bosanquet wrote of the in-laws as viewing her as too "presumptuous", particularly in keeping figures such as Edith Wharton - whose adultery they disapproved of - informed about the novelist's wellbeing. When James died in 1916, Bosanquet turned down an invitation to become Wharton's secretary in Paris, choosing instead to work for the final two years of the First World War in the War Trade Intelligence Department and Ministry of Food. In 1919, she received an MBE for her wartime work.

Following James's death, Bosanquet had written a number of articles about him for magazines in England and America, including for the Fortnightly Review, and the American modernist magazine The Little Review (1918). She later developed, at the Woolfs' request, the Little Review article into a memoir, published by the Hogarth Press in 1924 as Henry James at Work, and reprinted, slightly revised, in 1927. This memoir is viewed today as a pioneering work of critical biography, and particularly valuable for Bosanquet's "objective and comparatively unbiased point of view" as "an intelligent and observant witness and reporter".

== Post-war years ==
In 1920, Bosanquet became Secretary to the International Federation of University Women (IFUW), an organisation formed the year before "to promote international understanding and friendship between university women around the world". She held this role for fifteen years, until 1935. That year, she became literary editor at the journal Time and Tide, a post she held for eight years, before being appointed to the board of directors, on which she remained until 1958. Bosanquet had been a regular reviewer for the magazine since 1927, contributing pieces on art, biography, and modernist literature. As well as her journalism, she wrote and published studies of Harriet Martineau and Paul Valéry.

From the early 1930s, Bosanquet developed an increasingly close relationship with Time and Tide founder Lady (Margaret) Rhondda, and the two lived together from 1933. Feminists and active suffragists, the two were life partners for 25 years, dividing their time between homes in London and Kent, until Lady Rhondda's death in 1958.

== Death and legacy ==
Following the death of her partner, Lady Rhondda, in 1958, Bosanquet moved to a single room in Crosby Hall, Chelsea, owned by the British Federation of University Women. She died in 1961. Her obituary in The Times, written by C. V. Wedgwood, noted Bosanquet's "organizing ability, her wide human sympathies, and her sustained idealism and belief in international cooperation", which had "most admirably fitted her for her position with the International Federation of University Women". Bosanquet's writing Wedgwood described as "distinguished by a breadth of knowledge, a fine precision of writing, a balanced judgement and a quiet humour". In her will, Bosanquet left money to the Crosby Hall Endowment Fund, and to the Society for Psychical Research, of which she had been a longtime member. Her funeral took place at Chelsea Old Church on 6 June 1961, following which she was cremated. Her ashes were interred in the grave of her mother and brother at Uplyme, Devon.

In 1973, the Theodora Bosanquet Bursary for Women Graduates was founded in her memory, providing assistance to women scholars or postgraduate students undertaking research in history or English literature.

In recent years, more note has been paid to Bosanquet's invaluable assistance in helping to transcribe and select Henry James's correspondence for the preparation of Leon Edel's The Letters of Henry James. She has also increasingly been viewed not merely as James's amanuensis, but as his "creative counterpoint" and "closest literary associate". A 2007 edition of Henry James at Work, edited by Lyall H. Powers:

... rescues Bosanquet from the shadows of literary history and shows her to be a fascinating figure in her own right, a skilled writer and editor, an early feminist, and a contemporary of the Bloomsbury literary community.

Reviewers of the work noted its revelation of Bosanquet as a woman of intellection "as fully engaged in the life of ideas and cultural production as her male counterparts, making as much of her putatively secondary status as she possibly could."

There have also been multiple fictional depictions of her life and work alongside James, including Author, Author (2004), The Typewriter’s Tale (2005), Dictation (2008) and The Constant Listener: Henry James and Theodora Bosanquet (2017).

An entry for Theodora Bosanquet was added to the Oxford Dictionary of National Biography in September 2022.

== Bibliography ==
- Henry James at Work, London: Leonard and Virginia Woolf at The Hogarth Press (1924)
- Harriet Martineau; An Essay in Comprehension, London: F. Etchells & H. Macdonald (1927)
- Paul Valéry, London: Leonard and Virginia Woolf at the Hogarth Press (1933)
