= Passionate Pilgrim =

The Passionate Pilgrim is an anthology of twenty poems published in 1599 as the work of William Shakespeare, though his authorship of many of the individual poems in the collection is doubted.

Passionate Pilgrim may also refer to:

- A Passionate Pilgrim, an 1871 novella by Henry James
- The Passionate Pilgrim (1921 film), an American film directed by Robert G. Vignola
- The Passionate Pilgrim (1984 film), a British short feature film starring Eric Morecambe
- The Passionate Pilgrim, or Eros and Anteros (1858), a volume of autobiographical writing by Francis Turner Palgrave, published under the pseudonym Henry J. Thurstan
- The Man from Australia: A Passionate Pilgrim (1925) by Katharine Tynan
