= Georgina's Reasons =

1884 novella by Henry James

- Author: Henry James
- Language: English
- Genre: Novella
- Published in: The Sun
- Publication date: 1884

Georgina's Reasons is an 1884 novella by American-British author Henry James. It was first serialized in The Sun (July-August 1884), and later reprinted in James's 1885 collection Stories Revived. Georgina's Reasons was excluded from the New York Edition of James's fiction, along with Washington Square, "The Romance of Certain Old Clothes" and several other works. In 2012, a Spanish translation of the novella by Pilar Lafuente was released by the publishing company Navona.

== Plot ==
=== Part I ===
In 1850s New York City, naive naval officer Raymond Benyon falls in love with the strange but coquettish Georgina Gressie. Georgina's parents disapprove of the relationship, intending to send their daughter away to Europe as a means of separating the pair. At Georgina's behest, Raymond marries her in a private ceremony. Georgina swears Raymond to secrecy regarding their union. Raymond impregnates his wife shortly there afterwards and is subsequently called away on duty. The Gressies' friend Mrs. Portico accompanies Georgina on her trip to Europe as a chaperone. Before they begin traveling, Georgina nonchalantly confesses her clandestine marriage and pregnancy to Mrs. Portico, indicating that she does not plan to see Raymond again. When the two are in the Italian countryside, Georgina gives birth and gives the baby to an Italian peasant woman. Mrs. Portico writes to Raymond about the whereabouts of his child, but subsequently dies of an illness that is worsened by her guilt at concealing the reality of Georgina's situation. After he receives Mrs. Portico's letter, Raymond searches for his child, but his efforts are in vain.

=== Part II ===
In the first half of the 1860s, American expatriate Kate Theory is residing in Italy with her invalid sister, Mildred. The two meet Raymond, and begin receiving visits from him on a regular basis. Mildred begs Kate to marry him, as she fears her sister will be forced to live in poverty as a dependant and a spinster. Mildred dies, and Kate loses contact with Raymond.

=== Part III ===
Kate and Raymond reunite when they are both invited to a Venetian palazzo. Kate is accompanied by her well-to-do cousin and his wife. Raymond sees a portrait of Georgina, and is informed that she has married a Mr, Roy and has become integrated into society. Raymond promises Kate that he will marry her, and travels to America in order to pay a visit to Georgina. Finding her in a lavish but tastelessly decorated home, Raymond begs Georgina to annul her first marriage, but she gleefully refuses. As he is too honorable to marry bigamously, it is implied that Raymond never weds Kate.

== Scholarship ==
In the early 1960s, literary scholar and James biographer Leon Edel referred to the novella as a "strange unmotivated sensational little story" [sic].

The scholar Roslyn Jolly observes that Georgina's Reasons is deeply influenced by the sensation fiction of the 1860s, particularly Mary Elizabeth Braddon's works- namely Aurora Floyd and Lady Audley's Secret. Although critics have posited that James used his novella's titular character to criticize the "New Woman" of the fin de sciècle, Joslyn argues that this is not the case.

The scholar Raymond Thorberg points out that Mildred Theory is obviously based on James's cousin, Minny Temple, and also exists as a prototype of Millie Theale, one of the principle characters in James's late-period novel, Wings of the Dove (1902). Thorberg also observes that Madame Chermidy's physically repulsive but devoted servant, Lump, in Edmond About's 1857 novel, Germaine, likely suggested the character of the Italian peasant in Georgina's Reasons.

== Adaptations ==
Volker Schlǒndorff adapted the novella for French television in 1975.

== Bibliography ==
- James, Henry, and Edward W Said. Complete Stories, 1884-1891. New York, Literary Classics Of The United States, 1999.
