= Martha Elizabeth Duncan Walker Cook =

American author, translator, and editor (1806–1874)

- Born: July 23, 1806; Northumberland
- Died: September 15, 1874; Hoboken
- Occupation: Translator
- Spouse: William Cook
- Children: Eugene Beauharnais Cook
- Father: Jonathan Hoge Walker
- Relatives: Robert J. Walker

Martha Elizabeth Duncan Walker Cook (23 July 1806 – 15 September 1874) was an American author, translator, and editor.

Martha Elizabeth Duncan Walker was born on 23 July 1806 in Northumberland, Pennsylvania, the daughter of Jonathan Hoge Walker and Mary Duncan Walker. Her siblings included Senator Robert J. Walker. In 1824, she married General William Cook. They were the parents of Eugene Beauharnais Cook, a writer of books on chess.

In 1863, she became editor of the Continental Review after her brother Robert purchased a half-interest in the journal. She toned down the strident political content and published her own poetry in the journal. The most notable work she published was "A Tragedy of Error" in February 1864, the first published story by Henry James. The journal folded later that year.

Cook had a particular affinity for Poland and Polish culture. She translated two works related to Poland from French and German: The Life of Chopin (1863) by Franz Liszt and The Undivine Comedy and Other Poems (1875) by Zygmunt Krasiński. She also published translations of Polish drama in the Continental Review.

Her other works include a translation of a biography of Joan of Arc by Guido Görres, serialized in Freeman's Journal. She also wrote the hymn "In some way or other the Lord will provide".

Martha Elizabeth Duncan Walker Cook died on 15 September 1874 in Hoboken, New Jersey.
