= Pierre-Marie-Charles de Bernard du Grail de la Villette =

French writer (1804 - 1850)

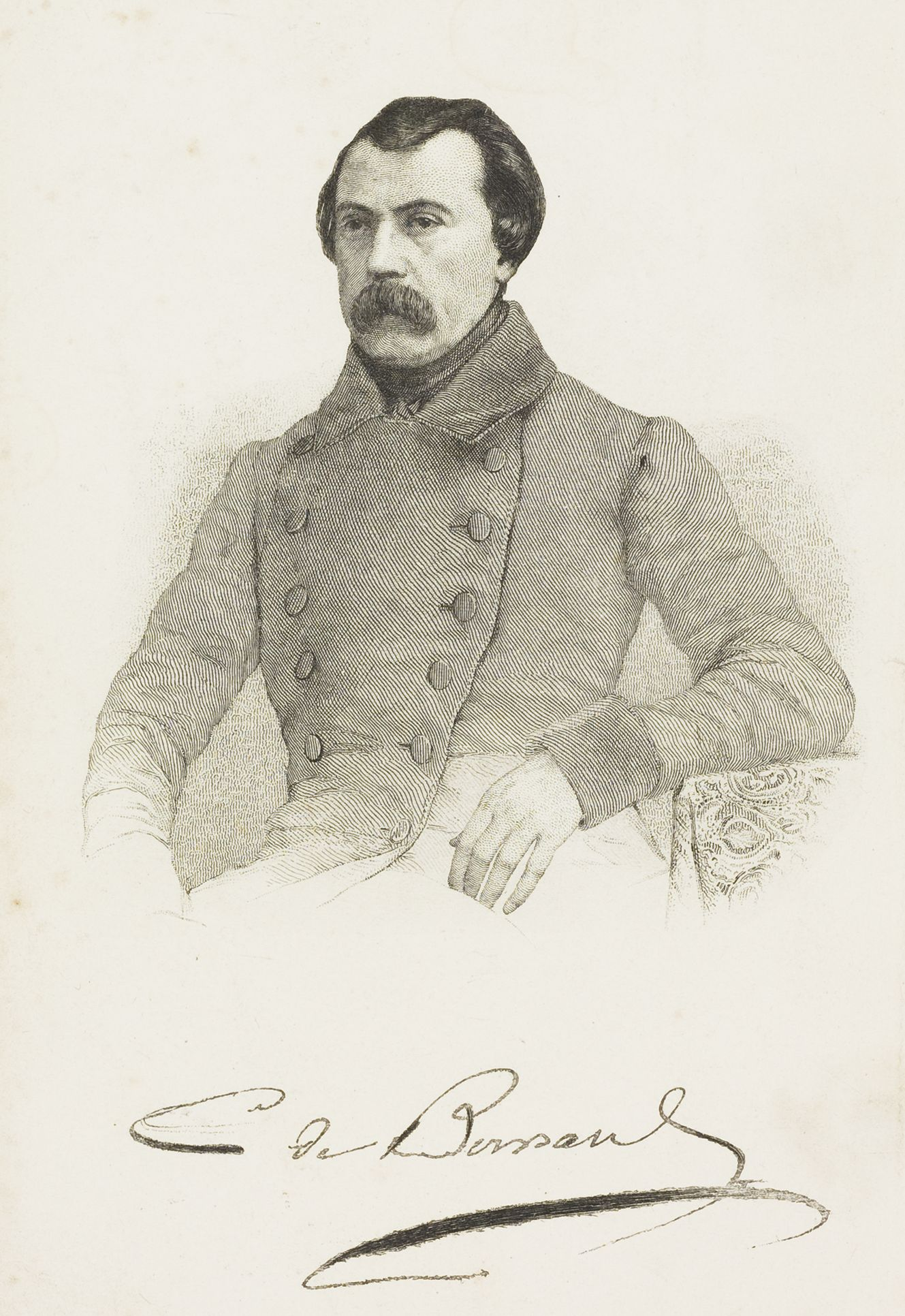
Charles de Bernard

Pierre-Marie-Charles de Bernard du Grail de la Villette (24 February 1804 – 6 March 1850), better known simply as Charles de Bernard, was a French writer.

== Biography ==
He was born in Besançon, member of a very ancient family of the Vivarais, was educated at the college of his native city, and studied for the law in Dijon and at Paris. He was awarded a prize by the Académie des Jeux Floraux for his Une fête de Neron in 1829. This first success in literature did not prevent him aspiring to the Magistrature, when the July Revolution broke out and induced him to enter politics.

He became one of the founders of the Gazette de Franche-Comté and an article in the pages of that journal about La peau de chagrin earned him the thanks and the friendship of Honoré de Balzac. The latter induced him to take up his domicile in Paris and introduced him to the art of novel-writing.

== Writing ==
Bernard had published a volume of odes: 'Plus Deuil que Joie' (1838), which was not much noticed, but a series of stories in the same year gained him the reputation of a genial 'conteur'. They were collected under the title 'Le Noeud Gordien', and one of the tales, 'Une Aventure du Magistrat,' was adapted by Victorien Sardou for his comedy 'Pommes du voisin'.

'Gerfaut', generally acclaimed as his greatest work, crowned by the Academy, appeared also in 1838, then followed 'Le Paravent', another collection of short stories (1839); 'Les Ailes d'Icare' (1840); La Peau du Lion and La Chasse aux Amants (1841); L'Écueil (1842); Un Beau-père (1845); and 'Le Gentilhomme campagnard,' in 1847. Bernard wrote two comedies in collaboration with "Léonce" (Charles-Henri-Ladislas Laurençot, 1805–1862). A collection of Bernard's complete works in 12 volumes was published after his death. His writings have been mostly forgotten today.

== Assessment by other writers ==
Jules Arsène Arnaud Claretie wrote about Bernard with much praise:

He surpasses [Balzac] in energy and limpidity of composition. His style is elegant and cultured. His genius is most fully represented in a score or so of delightful tales ... full of invention and originality, and saturated with the purest and pleasantest essence of the spirit which ... made French literature the delight and recreation of Europe.

In The Paris Sketch Book William Makepeace Thackeray discusses Bernard's writing:

M. de Bernard's characters are men and women of genteel society--rascals enough, but living in no state of convulsive crimes; and we follow him in his lively, malicious account of their manners, without risk of lighting upon any such horrors as Balzac or Dumas has provided for us.

Henry James, in his French Poets and Novelists (1878), wrote:

Charles de Bernard has at the present day hardly more than an historical value, and his novels are not to be recommended to people who have anything of especial importance at hand to read. But in speaking of the secondary French novelists it is but fair to allow him a comfortable niche, for if he be not especially worth studying he at least leaves you a very friendly feeling for him if he comes in your way.
