= A Tragedy of Error =

Short story by Henry James

"A Tragedy of Error" is a short story by American writer Henry James, his first, written at the age of 21 and published anonymously in the February 1864 issue of Continental Monthly by its editor Martha Elizabeth Duncan Walker Cook. This story was never collected or published by James in book form, but appears in the Library of America edition of his stories that cover the years 1864–1874.

The story is approximately 7500 words in length, is divided into four parts, and is written using the third person narrative voice.

== Plot summary ==
Mrs. Hortense Bernier receives a letter notifying her of her lame husband's return after an absence of two years. She is greatly affected by the letter; It is implied that she has been carrying on an affair with Monsieur de Meyrau and is certain her husband will find out. The next day, she rents a boat from a "dogged, brutal, and sullen" ferryman. In conversation, she learns that he is very poor and has killed several men. She asks him to meet her husband at the port when he arrives and kill him in return for payment. He agrees. The next day, M. de Meyrau goes to meet M. Bernier at the dock. On hearing that he had already been carried off by a boatman, he asks a different boatman to take him to Madame Bernier's. This boatman, who mistakes him for Monsieur Bernier, says, "You're just the man I want." An hour later, Hortense Bernier steps out of her house to see a limping man come toward her with outstretched arms.
