= A Passionate Pilgrim =

1871 novella by Henry James

A Passionate Pilgrim, and Other Tales
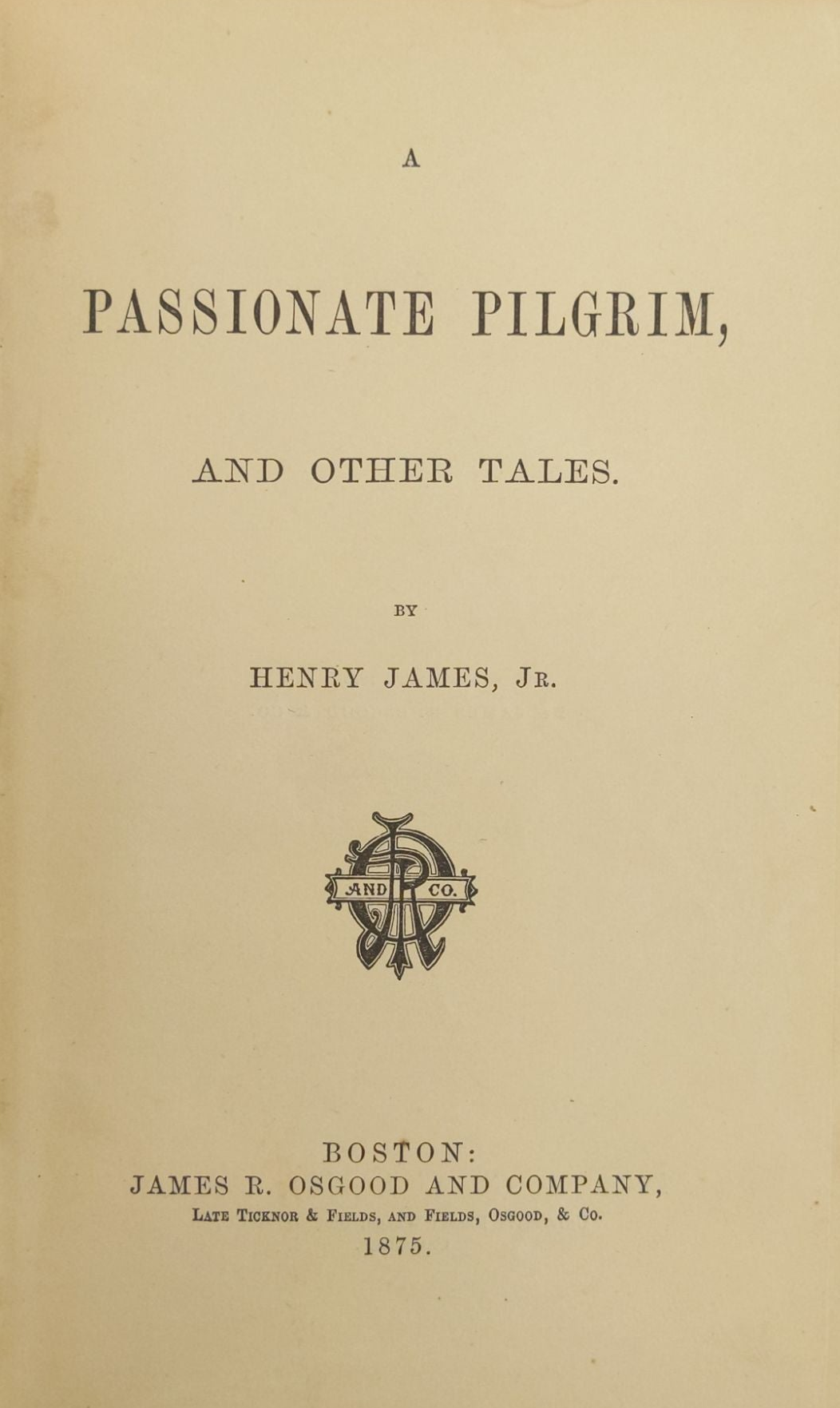
- Title page for A Passionate Pilgrim (1875)
- Author: Henry James
- Language: English
- Genre: Novella
- Publisher: The Atlantic Monthly
- Publication date: March–April 1871
- Publication place: United States
- Media type: Print
- Pages: 40

A Passionate Pilgrim is a novella by Henry James, first published in The Atlantic Monthly in 1871. The story was the earliest fiction that James included in the New York Edition (1907–1909) of his works. Set in England, the tale shows James' strong interest in the contrast between the Old World and the New. In fact, the difference between America and Europe erupts into open conflict in the story, which leads to an ironic ending.

== Plot summary ==
The narrator meets fellow American Clement Searle at an old-fashioned London inn. Searle has long wanted to settle in England to escape what he considers his arid life in America. But he is physically ailing, and he's also depressed because his lawyer cannot uphold his claim to a share in a country estate currently owned by Richard Searle, a distant relation. Clement and the narrator visit the estate, where they meet the ethereal Miss Searle, who supports Clement's cause.

They also meet Miss Searle's brother Richard, who is at first suspicious and then outright hostile and combative toward Clement. Upset by the conflict Clement and the narrator travel to Oxford, where they help a gentleman, Mr Rawson, down on his luck to travel to America. Clement is now very sick and sends for Miss Searle. She responds to his call and tells him that her brother has been thrown from a horse and killed. Clement might now have a real chance for a share of the estate, but the opportunity comes too late for him. He dies and is buried in the England which proved so inhospitable to him.

== Key themes ==
Clement Searle is an early example of James' imaginative and sensitive protagonists who are often defeated by less fastidious adversaries. The perhaps overly blunt irony of the story is that Clement might have realized his dream of living on an English estate if his physical frailty had not betrayed him.

The story shows James still in his apprentice stage. Although written in an assured and fluent manner, there are many passages of local color description that intrude rather obviously into the narrative. These passages do give substance to Clement's dream of settling and living in the England he has long idealized. Of course, Clement's creator would realize that dream by living and prospering in England for most of his adulthood.

The story also plays on another common theme in James' fiction: the simultaneous allure and danger of experience. The closer Clement gets to his goal of a home in the English countryside, the sicker he becomes. James' fiction would often show imaginative characters getting near the dense, "passionate" experience they desire, only to find that such experience can be destructive as well.

== Critical evaluation ==
In his New York Edition preface James admitted the story's technical shortcomings. But the tale meant much to him as an early example of his international theme, the vivid contrast between Europe and America. Critics have generally agreed that the story makes the theme immediate and appealing, though there has been disagreement as to whether the tale is really all that much better than other early fiction James excluded from the New York Edition.

Some critics have expressed impatience with Clement Searle as an impractical dreamer and a weak example of James' "poor sensitive gentlemen." Clement's physical illness makes him even less effective in the crude business of the world than some of James' other defeated protagonists. But his desire for a new and more emotionally fulfilling existence may gain him sympathy from readers who can identify with his dreams.

== Publication history ==
"A Passionate Pilgrim" first appeared in two installments in The Atlantic Monthly of 1871 (27(161) (March 1871): 352–371; and 27(162) (April 1871):478–499.

James revised the text for inclusion in A Passionate Pilgrim and Other Tales, his first short story collection and indeed his first published book. There it appears as the first of six stories (pages 7 to 124). A Passionate Pilgrim and Other Tales was published on 31 January 1875 under the imprint "Boston: James R. Osgood and Company", and sold for $2 each. The initial printing was of 1500 copies, but not all copies were bound immediately: about 400 copies that were bound in 1878 or later have the imprint of Houghton Osgood & Co. on their spine. There was no English edition, but copies of the American edition were imported, hand-stamped "London: Trübner & Co." or "London: Trübner & Co. 57 & 59 Ludgate Hill.", and sold for 10/6.

James further revised the text of the story for a continental edition, published by Leipzig: Tauchnitz in 1884 together with "The Siege of London" and "The Point of View".

It went through a fourth authorial revision before appearing in Stories Revived, a collection of east stories by James that had not yet appeared in book form in an English edition. Stories Revived was published in 1885 by London: Macmillan & Co., initially in a three-volume edition, and shortly afterwards in a two-volume reprint.

It was revised for a fifth time for the New York Edition, appearing in 1908 in Volume 13. This is the last published edition in James' lifetime, so as with many other "New York Edition" texts it is widely regarded as the authoritative text.

Since James' death "A Passionate Pilgrim" has been collected numerous times: for example, in The Novels and Stories of Henry James, the first posthumous collection of James' works (1921–23); in Leon Edel's The Complete Tales of Henry James (1862–1864); in the unfinished Oxford edition of The Tales of Henry James (1873–84); in an Everyman's Library edition in 1999; and, the same year, in The Library of America collection of James works.
