= The Outcry =

1911 novel by Henry James

- First edition (UK)
- Author: Henry James
- Language: English
- Publisher: Methuen & Co., London; Charles Scribner's Sons, New York City
- Publication date: Methuen: 5-Oct-1911; Scribner's: 5-Oct-1911
- Publication place: United Kingdom, United States
- Media type: Print (hardback & paperback)
- Pages: Methuen: 311 pp Scribner's: 261 pp

The Outcry is a novel by Henry James published in 1911. It was originally conceived as a play. James cast the material in a three-act drama in 1909, but like many of his plays, it failed to be produced. (There were two posthumous performances in 1917.) In 1911 James converted the play into a novel, which was successful with the public. The Outcry was the last novel he was able to complete before his death in 1916. The storyline concerns the buying up of Britain's art treasures by wealthy Americans.

== Plot summary ==
To cover the gambling debts of his daughter Kitty Imber, the widowed Lord Theign is planning to sell his beautiful painting Duchess of Waterbridge by Sir Joshua Reynolds to American billionaire Breckenridge Bender. Hugh Crimble, a young art critic, argues against the sale, saying that Britain's art treasures should stay in the country. He is supported by Theign's perceptive daughter, Lady Grace. When the newspapers get wind of the potential sale of the Reynolds, they raise a patriotic outcry, which delights Bender.

Meanwhile, Crimble has found another painting in Theign's collection that he suspects is a rarity by Mantovano. (James thought this artist was a fiction, but it later turned out that there really was an obscure painter of that name.) Eventually, Crimble's hunch about the Mantovano turns out to be correct. Theign decides to donate the Mantovano to the National Gallery and not to sell the Reynolds to Bender. His friend Lady Sandgate also donates her family's Sir Thomas Lawrence painting to the Gallery, which unites her and Theign.

== Key themes ==
While the controversy in this novel might seem hopelessly remote and trivial, it is seemingly similar to the furor that erupted during the 1980s in the United States, when Japanese buyers were snapping up "trophy acquisitions" in America. American newspapers at the time created much the same stink as the British newspapers in James' book. Eventually, the fuss simmered down due to Japan's own economic troubles.

Although James did not like his adopted country selling out its art treasures to foreign bidders, he was well aware that Britain's hands were far from clean in this regard. He has Lady Grace make a pointed reference to the Elgin Marbles, a sore subject to this day. The novel maintains a sprightly pace and features many appealing characters, especially the high-tempered but basically good-hearted Theign. The conventional happy ending may seem rather insipid, but a book like this could hardly end unhappily.

== Critical evaluation ==
Critics have generally regarded The Outcry as a pleasant trifle turned out in James' declining years. There have been criticisms of the novel's sometimes artificial dialogue and the stage business inherited from the dramatic version.

James confessed in a letter to Edith Wharton that such a light, half-length novel was the most he could manage in his late sixties.
