= French Poets and Novelists =

- First edition
- Author: Henry James
- Language: English
- Genre: Literary criticism
- Publisher: Macmillan and Co., London
- Publication date: 19-Feb-1878
- Publication place: United Kingdom
- Media type: Print
- Pages: 439

French Poets and Novelists is a book of literary criticism by Henry James published in 1878. The book collected essays that James had written over the preceding several years. From an early age James was fluent in French and read widely in the country's literature. These essays show a deep familiarity with the techniques and themes of many French writers. The book also includes an interesting essay on Russian novelist Ivan Turgenev, who James read in a German translation.

== Summary and themes ==
This was James' first book of literary criticism, and it's no surprise he made it a collection of essays about French writers (and Turgenev). As a child he had visited France for long periods with his family, and he had lived in Paris for about a year before moving permanently to England in 1876. Thoroughly familiar with the language and personally acquainted with many French writers, James could offer insight into the country's literature that few Americans of his time (or any time) could match.

James' familiarity with French literature hardly meant that he approved of everything the country produced. He ripped into Baudelaire's Fleurs du mal for what he thought was a puerile conception of evil: "...evil for him begins outside and not inside, and consists primarily of a great deal of lurid landscape...an affair of blood and carrion and physical sickness—there must be stinking corpses and starving prostitutes and empty laudanum bottles in order that the poet shall be effectively inspired...Our impatience is of the same order as that which we should feel if a poet, pretending to pluck 'the flowers of good', should come and present us, as specimens, a rhapsody on plumcake and eau de Cologne."

This was indicative of how James would portray evil in his own fiction, as a "thing at its source, deep in the human consciousness". In his essay on Turgenev, James proclaimed in stirring tones his own conception of reality and how the novelist had to face it: "Life is, in fact, a battle. On this point optimists and pessimists agree. Evil is insolent and strong; beauty enchanting but rare; goodness very apt to be weak; wickedness to carry the day; imbeciles to be in great places, people of sense in small, and mankind generally unhappy. But the world as it stands is no illusion, no phantasm, no evil dream of a night; we wake up to it again for ever and ever; we can neither forget it nor deny it nor dispense with it." James would often portray his sensitive protagonists ground down and defeated by treacherous but inescapable life.

The book also offered two long, instructive essays on the novelist James would always regard as his most important guide and mentor, Balzac: "He believed that he was about as creative as the Deity, and that if mankind and human history were swept away the Comédie Humaine would be a perfectly adequate substitute for them." James wouldn't make such grandiose claims for his own fiction, but he always tried to make his novels and tales into equally precise and comprehensive documents on human nature.

=== Table of contents ===
Alfred de Musset; Théophile Gautier; Charles Baudelaire; Honoré de Balzac; Balzac's Letters; George Sand	Charles de Bernard and Gustave Flaubert; Ivan Turgénieff; The Two Ampères; Madame de Sabran; Mérimée's Letters; The Théâtre Français

== Critical evaluation ==
The maturity and assurance of these early essays is striking. James obviously benefitted from a thorough saturation in French literature, and he was not intimidated by reputation or other critics. He would often return to some of the writers discussed in this book, particularly Balzac and George Sand, and occasionally modify his opinions.

James never thought the last word could be said about any writer deserving of extended review. His later essays on the novelists considered in this book would sometimes show greater maturity and knowledge. But he always treated his fellow writers with an independent, inquiring spirit free from preconceptions and allegiances to narrow critical doctrines.
