= The Story of a Year =

1865 short story by Henry James

"The Story of a Year" is a short story by American writer Henry James that first appeared in the March 1865 issue of the Atlantic Monthly. This story was never collected and published by James in book form, but appears in the Library of America edition of his stories that cover the years 1864-1874.

The story is approximately 16,600 words in length and divided into five parts.

== Plot summary ==
The story starts in "early May, two years ago" during the American Civil War. Jack and Elizabeth, a newly-engaged young couple, walk through the country to their New England home. Jack asks Elizabeth to keep their engagement a secret, and she agrees. That night Jack confides in his mother about the engagement. His mother, who is also Elizabeth's guardian, does not approve—she accuses Lizzie of being shallow. The next day Jack gets called off to war. While he is away, Lizzie goes to Leatherborough to stay with a friend, Mrs. Littlefield. While there, she meets Mr. Bruce, whom she falls in love with. No one knows that she is engaged, so his courtship is encouraged. Jack comes home fatally wounded and dies with Elizabeth by his side. Mr. Bruce proposes to Elizabeth and is refused.
