= Partial Portraits =

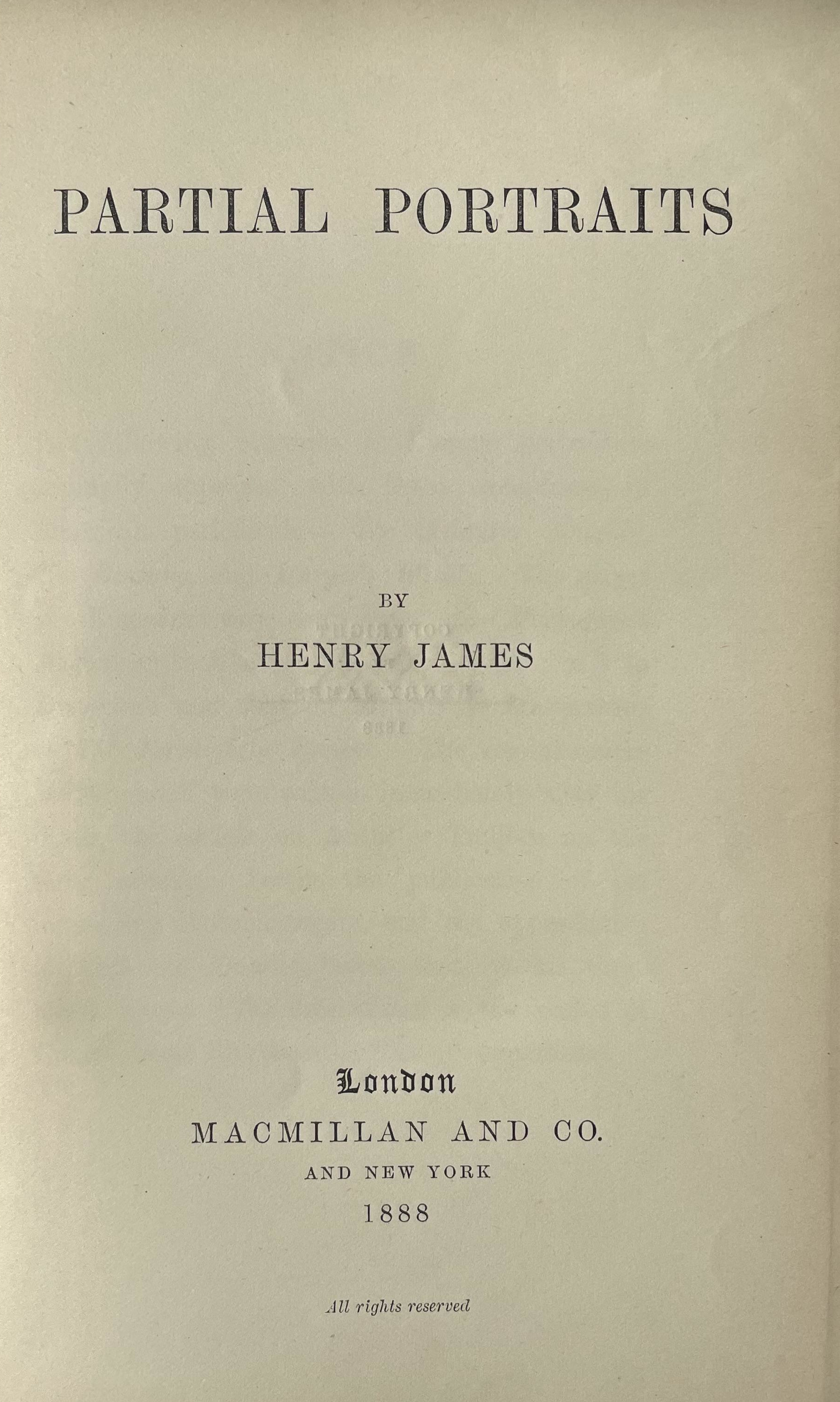
- Title page of Partial Portraits (1st edition, 1888)
- Author: Henry James
- Language: English
- Genre: Literary criticism
- Publisher: Macmillan and Co.
- Publication date: 8 May 1888
- Publication place: London, England, United Kingdom
- Media type: Print (Hardback)
- Pages: 408
- OCLC: 327051

Partial Portraits is a book of literary criticism by Henry James published in 1888. The book collected essays that James had written over the preceding decade, mostly on English and American writers, but also on the works of Alphonse Daudet, Guy de Maupassant, and Ivan Turgenev. Perhaps the most important essay was The Art of Fiction, James' argument for the widest possible freedom in content and technique in narrative fiction.

== Summary and themes ==
In his essay “The Art of Fiction”, Henry James suggests that, “the story and the novel, the idea and the form, are the needle and thread, and I never heard of a guild of tailors who recommended the use of the thread without the needle or the needle without the thread.” The essay The Art of Fiction was written in response to an article by English critic Walter Besant that attempted to establish the "laws of fiction." For instance, Besant insisted that novelists should confine themselves to their own experience: "A young lady brought up in a quiet country village should avoid descriptions of garrison life." James argued that a sufficiently alert novelist could obtain knowledge from everywhere and use it to good purpose: "The young lady living in a village has only to be a damsel upon whom nothing is lost to make it quite unfair (as it seems to me) to declare to her that she shall have nothing to say about the military. Greater miracles have been seen than that, imagination assisting, she should speak the truth about some of these gentlemen."

James continually argues for the fullest freedom in the novelist's choice of subject and method of treatment: "The only obligation to which in advance we may hold a novel, without incurring the accusation of being arbitrary, is that it be interesting." In particular, James is suspicious of restraining fiction with specific moral guidelines: "No good novel will ever proceed from a superficial mind; that seems to me an axiom which, for the artist in fiction, will cover all needful moral ground."

James followed his own advice in criticizing the various writers included in Partial Portraits. In his essay on Maupassant, for instance, he wrote of the Frenchman's propensity for what James called the "monkeys' cage" view of human existence. But James from praisied Maupassant's vigour, precision and conciseness in describing life as he saw it.

Similarly, James praised the intellectual force of George Eliot, the stolid but comprehensive detail-work of Anthony Trollope, the unbounded imagination of Robert Louis Stevenson, and the genial common sense of Alphonse Daudet. All very different writers, but all speak with validity from their personal view on life. This wide range presages the "house of fiction" image James would include in the New York Edition preface to The Portrait of a Lady, where each novelist looks at life from a particular window of the house and thus composes a unique and personally characteristic account.

=== Table of contents ===
Chapter	Original publication
Emerson	Macmillan's Magazine (December 1887), volume LVII, number 338, page 86
The Life of George Eliot	"George Eliot's Life", The Atlantic Monthly (May 1885), volume LV, page 668
Daniel Deronda: A Conversation	The Atlantic Monthly (December 1876), volume XXXVIII, page 684
Anthony Trollope	The Century Magazine (July 1883), volume XXVI, number 4, page 385
Robert Louis Stevenson	Written 1887; published in The Century Magazine (April 1888), volume XXXV, number 6, page 869
Miss Woolson	Harper's Weekly (12 February 1887), volume XXXI, number 1573, page 114
Alphonse Daudet	The Century Magazine (August 1883), volume XXVI, number 4, page 498
Guy de Maupassant	The Fortnightly Review (1 March 1888), volume XLIII (New Series), number CCLV, page 364
Ivan Turgénieff	Written 1884; published in The Atlantic Monthly (January 1884), volume LIII, number CCCXV, page 42
George du Maurier	"Du Maurier and London Society", The Century Magazine (May 1883), volume XXVI, number 1, page 49
The Art of Fiction	Longman's Magazine (September 1884), volume IV, number XXIII, page 502

== Critical evaluation ==
Although later critics have often disagreed with James' particular judgments of individual writers or works, almost all acknowledge that James helped to make narrative fiction discussable as one of the fine arts. Partial Portraits contains some of James' most memorable and comprehensive essays on his fellow writers, and with grace and style he took their works seriously as artistic efforts of the first importance.

A personal note is the essay on Constance Fenimore Woolson, a woman who played an important if still uncertain role in James' life. This is the only essay in Partial Portraits on a writer of minor significance, and it has provided grist to the mill of biographical speculation.
