= F. W. Dupee =

Frederick Wilcox Dupee (AKA Fred Dupee and F. W. Dupee) (June 25, 1904 – January 19, 1979) was a distinguished American literary critic, essayist for Partisan Review and The New York Review of Books, and professor of English at Columbia University. He evolved from radical Marxist penning political essays to highly respected literary critic.

== Early life and career ==
Dupee was born in Chicago on June 25, 1904. He was the son of Leroy Church and Frances Wilcox Dupee. He earned a PhD from Yale University in 1927.

In the 1930s, he was a Marxist radical, whose circle included: Robert Cantwell, Edmund Wilson, Malcolm Cowley, John Chamberlain, Erskine Caldwell, Matthew Josephson, Harry Hansen, James T. Farrell, Meyer Schapiro, John Dos Passos, Newton Arvin, Kenneth Burke, Granville Hicks, Kenneth Fearing, and Whittaker Chambers. With Cantwell and others, Dupee held an abiding interest in Henry James. Within this circle, Dupee, Chambers, and Arvin were gay or bisexual.

He taught at Bowdoin College and Bard College before going to Columbia University in 1948, where he taught modernist literature. Mary McCarthy was a colleague of his at Bard.

He was an eminent scholar of Henry James, wrote on contemporary American literature and culture, and edited editions of Austen, Dickens, Gertrude Stein, and Leon Trotsky.

== Personal and death ==
Dupee was a Marxist, and an organizer for the Communist Party in New York City in the mid-1930s.

He was a founding editor of the Partisan Review and the literary editor of The New Masses. By 1937 he had had become disillusioned with the party, although he maintained his socialist thought and activism for the rest of his life.

He died of a drug overdose in 1979.

== Selected works ==
- Henry James for the American Men of Letters Series by F.W. Dupee (1974)
- The Question of Henry James: A Collection of Critical Essays (1947)
- The King of the Cats and Other Remarks on Writers and Writing (1965) A collection of essays consisting mostly of previously published book reviews.
- The Russian Revolution (1959)
