= Hawthorne (book) =

1880 book by Henry James

- Original 1879 Macmillan and Co. edition
- Author: Henry James
- Language: English
- Genre: Literary criticism
- Publisher: Macmillan and Co., London; Harper & Brothers, New York City
- Publication date: Macmillan: 12-Dec-1879; Harper: 15-Jan-1880
- Publication place: United Kingdom, United States
- Media type: Print
- Pages: Macmillan: 183; Harper: 177

Hawthorne is a book of literary criticism by Henry James published in 1879. The book was a study of James' great predecessor Nathaniel Hawthorne. James gave extended consideration to each of Hawthorne's novels and a selection of his short stories. He also reviewed Hawthorne's life and some of his nonfiction. The book became somewhat controversial for a famous section in which James enumerated the items of novelistic interest he thought were absent from American life.

== Summary and themes ==
This is the only book-length study James wrote about a fellow novelist, and it is not surprising he picked Hawthorne for such extended treatment. The tradition Hawthorne began in American literature – the morally intense exploration of the universality of guilt and the ambiguities of human choice – was clearly carried on by James.

Although James expressed misgivings about some of Hawthorne's more extravagant symbolism and heavy reliance on allegory, he shared his predecessor's constant interest in moral quandaries, divided loyalties, and the inevitable conflicts between imaginative protagonists and intractable reality. James also shared Hawthorne's passion for careful craftmanship and thorough, unsparing analysis of character.

James' ranking of Hawthorne's novels, from The Scarlet Letter down to The Marble Faun, has generally been accepted by later critics. Although James, at least in his earlier work, was more of a consistent realist than Hawthorne, the later novelist's work always betrays the influence of his predecessor's tendency towards metaphorical expression. In James' final novels such as The Golden Bowl, this influence becomes even more pronounced in extended metaphor and complex symbolism.

== Critical evaluation ==
By and large James' book has enjoyed favorable reviews from later critics. They have usually recommended the book as one of permanent interest and still well worth reading. Critics have disagreed about how closely James followed Hawthorne's example, though there's general agreement that the influence was considerable, especially as James' fiction became more symbolic and dominated by psychological introspection.

The book is free from critical jargon and easily accessible to readers with little or no knowledge of Hawthorne's works. James can be surprisingly cutting and humorous about some of Hawthorne's more questionable flights of fancy. When Arthur Dimmesdale in The Scarlet Letter supposedly beholds an immense letter A marked out in dim red lines in the night sky, James says that Hawthorne is "crossing the line which separates the sublime from its intimate neighbor. We are tempted to say that this is not moral tragedy, but physical comedy."
