= The Middle Years (autobiography) =

- First edition (UK)
- Author: Henry James
- Language: English
- Genre: Autobiography
- Publisher: Collins UK; Scribners (US)
- Publication date: Collins: 18-Oct-1917; Scribner's: 23-Nov-1917
- Publication place: United Kingdom, United States
- Media type: Print
- Pages: Collins: 118; Scribner's: 119

The Middle Years is an incomplete book of autobiography by Henry James, posthumously published in 1917. The book covers the early years of James' residence in Europe and his meetings with writers such as George Eliot, Alfred Tennyson, and James Russell Lowell.

== Summary and themes ==
The seven chapters of this fragment show promise as a record of James' young manhood in Europe. He met many of the leading writers of the day, though his opinions of them were not always flattering. Tennyson he found rather dull and commonplace, not at all the fine mind he expected. The poet's reading of Locksley Hall left James unimpressed.

George Eliot appealed much more to James with her interesting conversation and alert consideration of ideas. James tells a story of how he helped summon a doctor when George Eliot's injured stepson required urgent medical aid. He compliments the novelist on how carefully she attended to the young man.

James also has much to say about the London of his first impressions: the rooms he stayed in, the Londoners he talked with on the streets, the theaters and museums he visited. The fragment concludes with a remembrance of Lady Waterford, a painter who possessed "that combination of rare beauty and rare talent which the Victorian age had for many years not ceased to acclaim."
