= The Birthplace =

1903 short story by Henry James

- Short story by Henry James
- Country: United Kingdom, United States
- Language: English
- Genre: Short story

Publication
- Published in: The Better Sort
- Publication type: Anthology
- Publisher: Methuen & Co., London; Charles Scribner's Sons, New York City
- Media type: Print (Hardback and Paperback)
- Publication date: Methuen: February 26, 1903; Scribner's: February 26, 1903

"The Birthplace" is a short story by Henry James, first published in his collection The Better Sort in 1903. A witty satire on the excesses of bardolatry, the story reflects James's skepticism about the authorship of Shakespeare's plays. Beyond the narrow scholarly issue, the story also shows a typically imaginative Jamesian protagonist inventing an alternative reality in his lecture on the Bard's supposed childhood activities.

== Plot ==
Morris Gedge is a librarian at a dull provincial library in England that is "all granite, fog and female fiction". He gets a welcome offer to become the custodian of the Shakespeare house at Stratford-on-Avon. Although Shakespeare's name is never mentioned in the story (James used the name twice in his Notebooks when he was planning the tale), it's obvious to whom "the supreme Mecca of the English-speaking race" is devoted.

Once installed as the custodian, Morris begins to doubt the chatter he is forced to give to tourists who visit the home. He starts to qualify and hesitate in his spiel. This brings anguish to his wife and a warning from the shrine's proprietors. Gedge finally decides that if silliness is what's wanted, he'll supply it abundantly. The last section of the story shows him delivering a hilarious lecture on how the child Shakespeare played around the house. Receipts from tourists increase, and Gedge gets a raise.

== Major themes ==
This story is a superbly humorous play on James' common theme of how the imaginative "children of light" inevitably find trouble in the real, unforgiving world. Morris is something of an exception in that he triumphs over the world's attempts to grind him down...by giving the world exactly what it wants. The story illustrates T. S. Eliot's dictum that humankind cannot bear very much reality.

But the story does not read at all as a grim reminder of how people would rather hear sweet fiction than sour fact. James clearly sympathizes with the amusing way Gedge devises a more appealing "reality" in his great parodic lecture on Shakespeare's imagined childhood. As for the authorship question itself, James found it very hard to believe that the "Stratford man" wrote the plays and sonnets. But he had found it almost as difficult to believe in any of the other supposed authors, such as Sir Francis Bacon. The final message of The Birthplace seems to be that Shakespeare's works themselves are far more important than the biographical details of whoever wrote them.

== Critical evaluation ==
Some critics have seen Morris' compromise not as the development of an artist but rather as the prostitution of an honest man. To some extent this view has validity because Gedge is forced to sacrifice scholarly scruples in favor of a more entertaining presentation. But the story's light touch indicates that James probably admired Morris' ability to construct a clever and detailed fantasy. After all, that's what James himself did in his own fiction.

Most critics agree that the story is delightfully told, no matter what the verdict may be on Gedge's intellectual integrity. Morris' final lecture is particularly memorable for its brilliant satire of tourist-trap hucksterism:

Across that threshold He habitually passed; through those low windows, in childhood, He peered out into the world that He was to make much happier by the gift to it of His genius; over the boards of this floor [...] His little feet often pattered; and the beams of this ceiling [...] He endeavoured, in boyish strife, to jump up and touch.
