= Hendrik Christian Andersen =

Norwegian-American sculptor and painter (1872–1940)

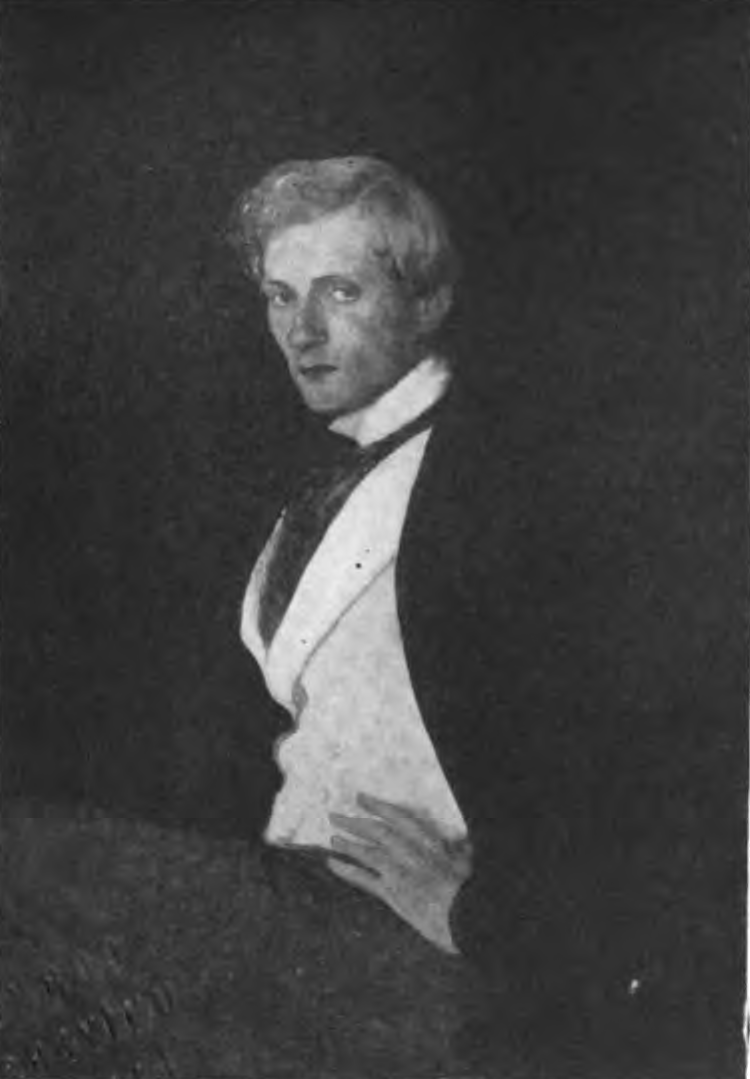
- portrait by Andreas Andersen
- Born: 15 April 1872; Bergen
- Died: 19 December 1940; Rome
- Occupations: Sculptor, painter
- Relatives: Andreas Martin Andersen

Hendrik Christian Andersen (15 April 1872 – 19 December 1940) was a Norwegian-American sculptor, painter and urban planner.

== Background ==
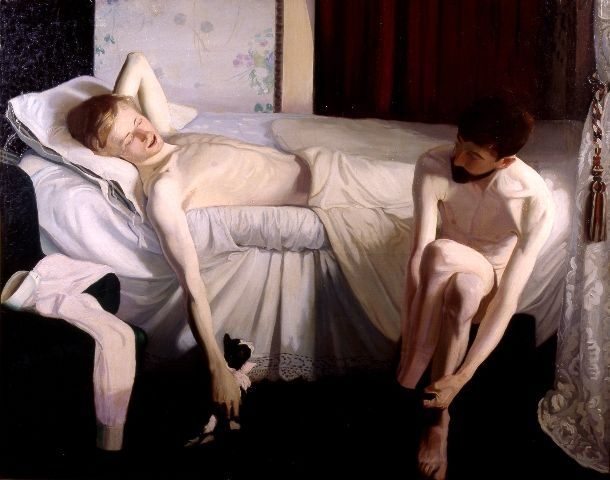
Hendrik Andersen and John Briggs Potter in Florence (1894). Painting by Andreas Martin Andersen, brother of the former (now in Museo Hendrik Andersen, Roma)

Andersen was born in Bergen, Norway to parents Anders Andersen from Lærdal and Helene Monsine Monsen from Bergen. He emigrated as an infant with his family to Newport, Rhode Island the following year. As a young man in Newport, Andersen began his work as a sculptor and learned to mingle among the city's wealthy elite, including serving as an art instructor for Gertrude Vanderbilt Whitney. In 1893, Andersen traveled to Europe to study art and eventually settled in Rome. There he ingratiated himself with other artists as well as a number of wealthy expatriate patrons and pursued his work.

== The World City ==
Andersen's sculpture, paintings, and writings demonstrate a fondness for large monumental classically inspired pieces, which, he believed, stirred in the viewer a desire for self-improvement. Much of his work was done in contemplation of the single idea of designing a perfect "World City," filled with art, which would motivate humanity to achieve a near-Utopian state. His urban planning philosophy is evident in his 1913 A World Center of Communication. This enormous tome (the text weighed over ten pounds) was written with Ernest Hébrard and grew out of Andersen's earlier writing, The Fountain of Life. Central to the work was Andersen's belief that art, more specifically monumental Beaux-Arts architecture, could bring about world peace and international harmony. The plan called for the creation of a central world capital. In his words, the city would be "a fountain of overflowing knowledge to be fed by the whole world of human endeavour in art, science, religion, commerce, industry, and law; and in turn to diffuse throughout the whole of humanity as though it were one grand, divine body conceived by God, the vital requirements which would renew its strength, protect its rights, and enable it to attain greater heights through a concentration of world effort."

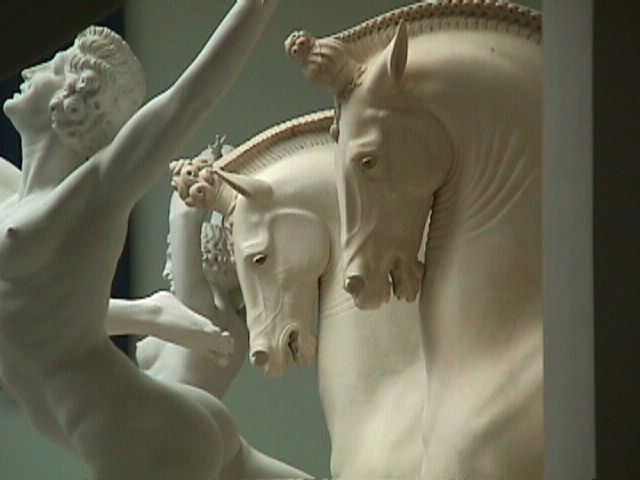
Stone sculpture by Hendrik Andersen. Rome, Andersen Museum

Evident in the treatise is Andersen's philosophy that art could change humanity and produce perfection. While roundly criticized by urban planners of the time for its political naïveté coupled with an over-emphasis on the monumental, the work demonstrates an appreciation of the political and social conflicts necessitated by the rampant nationalism of the early 20th Century and sought to use art to bring about an Utopian world. Andersen's view of the power of art and architecture to transform society can be seen as a precursor to similar concepts advanced later in the 20th century by a variety of urban planners including Le Corbusier in his Contemporary City.

== Relationship with Henry James ==
In 1899 Andersen met the American expatriate writer Henry James. Although James was almost 30 years his senior the two developed a close relationship that was to last until James' death in 1916. While the precise nature of the relationship is still unclear and may always be so—the two actually met on just a few occasions, and then for only brief periods of time—they exchanged numerous letters, which evidence a close, loving, homoerotic bond perhaps best illustrated by a letter from James to Andersen following the death of Andersen's brother, dated 9 February 1902 where James wrote:

The sense that I can't help you, see you, talk to you, touch you, hold you close & long, or do anything to make you rest on me, & feel my deep participation – this torments me, dearest boy, makes me ache for you, & for myself; makes me gnash my teeth & groan at the bitterness of things. ... This is the one thought that relieves me about you a little - & I wish you might fix your eyes on it for the idea, just, of the possibility. I am in town for a few weeks, but return to Rye April 1st, & sooner or later to have you there & do for you, to put my arm round you & make you lean on me as on a brother & a lover, & keep you on & on, slowly comforted or at least relieved of the bitterness of pain – this I try to imagine as thinkable, attainable, not wholly out of the question.

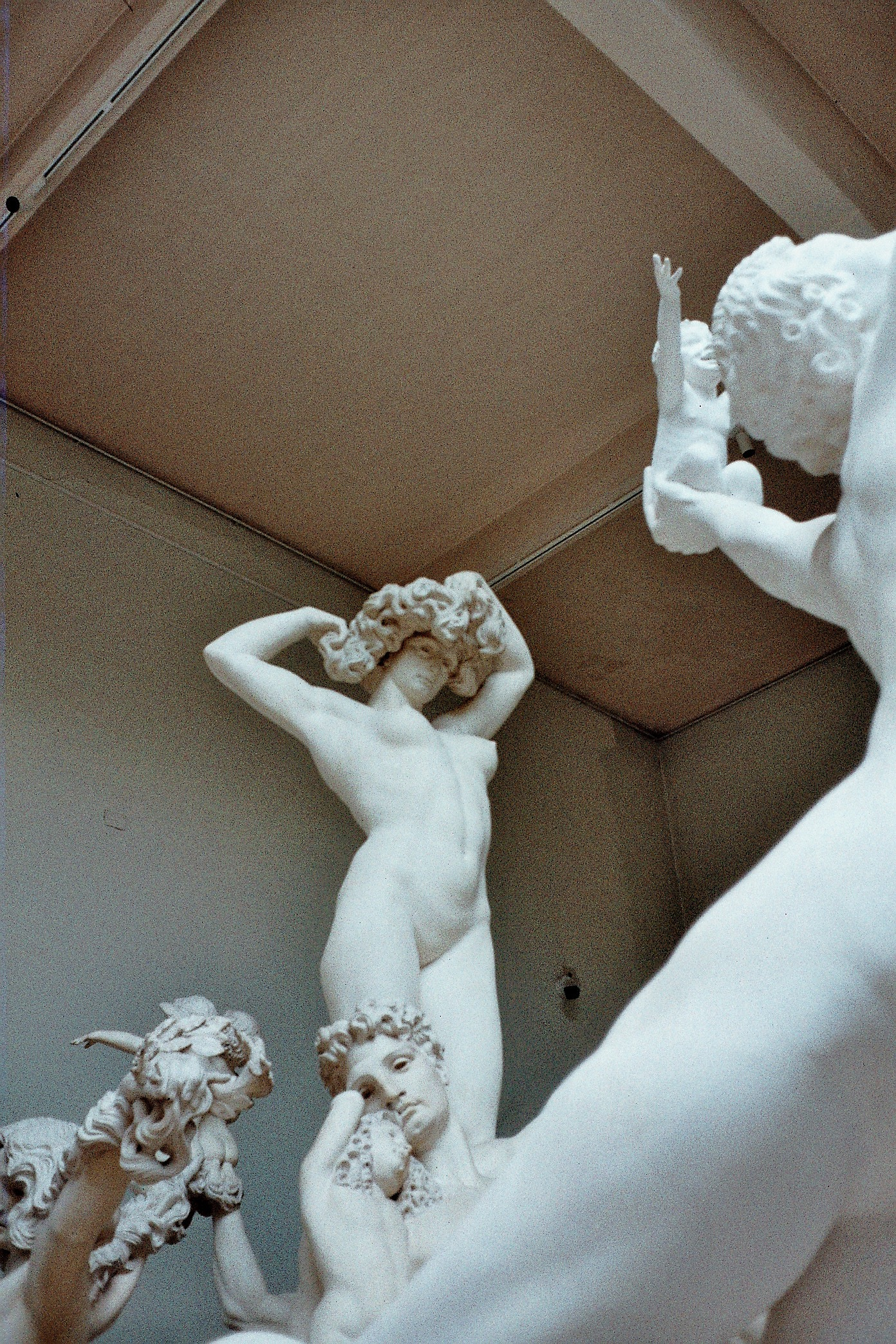
Plaster statue by Hendrik Andersen. Rome, Andersen Museum

Despite such affection, James lost patience with Andersen when the sculptor tried to interest him in the grandiose plans for the "World City." In response to Andersen's request that James endorse such plans, the novelist wrote on 4 September 1913:

I simply loathe such pretentious forms of words like "World" anything—they are to me mere monstrous sound without sense. The World is a prodigious & portentous & immeasurable affair, & I can't for a moment pretend to sit in my little corner here & "sympathise with" proposals for dealing with it. It is so far vaster in its appalling complexity than you or me, or than anything we can pretend without the imputation of absurdity & insanity to do to it, that I content myself, & inevitably must (so far as I can do anything now) with living in the realities of things, with "cultivating my garden" (morally & intellectually speaking) & with referring my questions to a Conscience (my own poor little personal) less inconceivable than that of the globe.

In another letter of April 14, 1912, James warned Andersen that he was slipping into megalomania with his plans for the "World City."

Colm Toibin's 2004 novel The Master draws upon many sources to explore and give insight into beginnings of the James/Andersen relationship.

== Hendrik Christian Andersen Museum ==
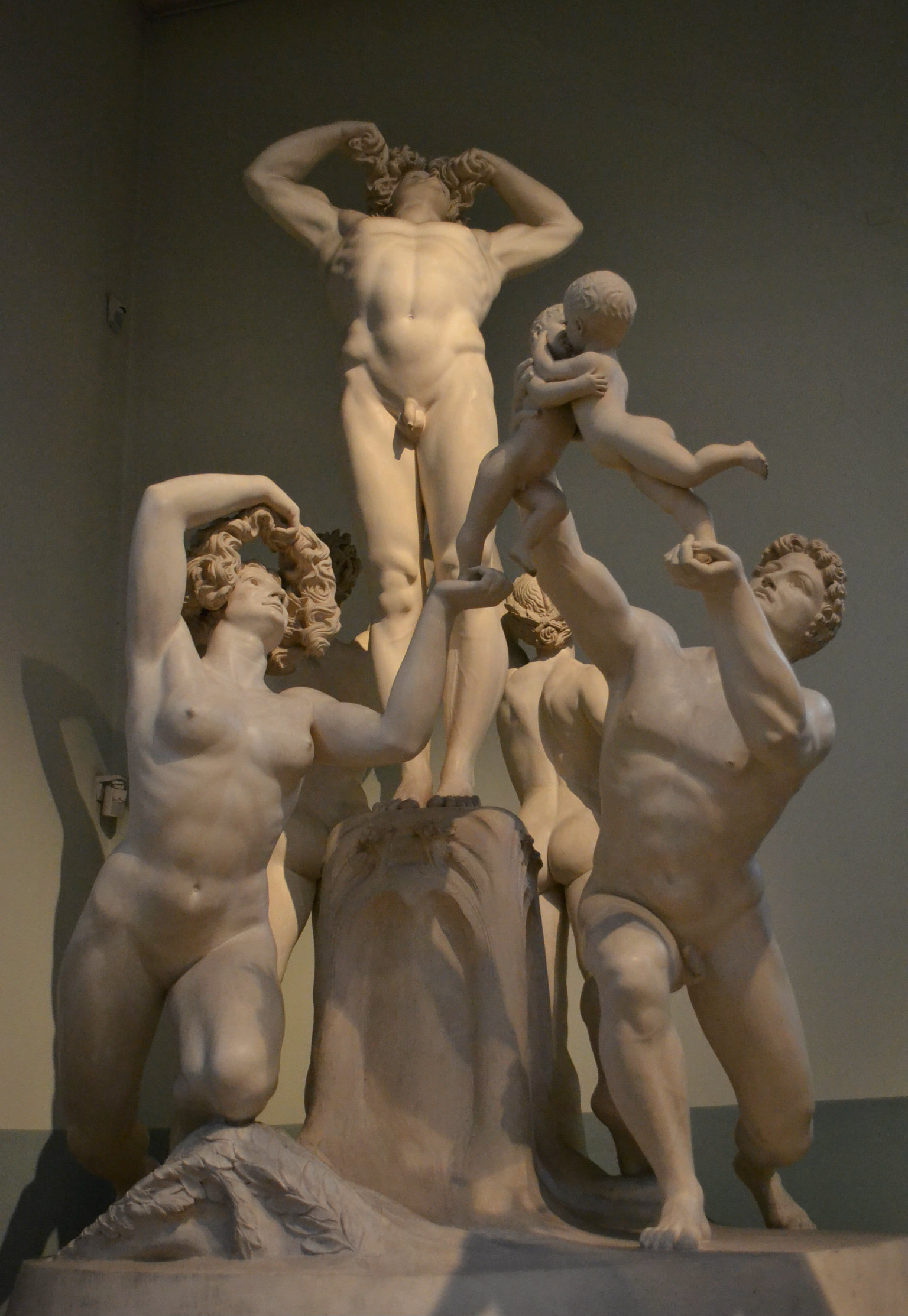
La famiglia e i piccoli innamorati

Andersen died in Rome in 1940. He bequeathed his home, studio, papers and more than 400 pieces of his work to the Italian Government. The home has been renovated and now is a museum located at Via Pasquale Stanislao Mancini, 20 (piazzale Flaminio). The museum is open to the public Tuesday through Sunday 9 a.m. to 8 p.m. and contains much of Andersen's work as well as that of other contemporary artists and photographers.

== Burial ==
Andersen died in Rome and is buried in the Protestant Cemetery, Rome (Cimitero acattolico).
