= Lyall Powers =

American academic (1924–2018)

Lyall H. Powers (July 13, 1924 – May 15, 2018) was a professor of English at the University of Michigan, where he taught since 1958. He was granted emeritus status by the University's Regents during their October 1992 meeting.

Powers wrote widely on modern American authors, and with Leon Edel, edited the complete notebooks of Henry James (Oxford University Press, 1987). One of his most widely circulated books is Alien Heart (University of Manitoba Press, 2005), a biography of Canadian author Margaret Laurence. A lifelong friend of Laurence, Powers met her when they were students together in the 1940s. The book is described as "the first full-length biography of Margaret Laurence that combines personal knowledge and insights about Laurence with a study of her work".

Powers' archives are held at the University of Manitoba Archives & Special Collections.
