= Henry James =

American British writer (1843–1916)

Henry James OM
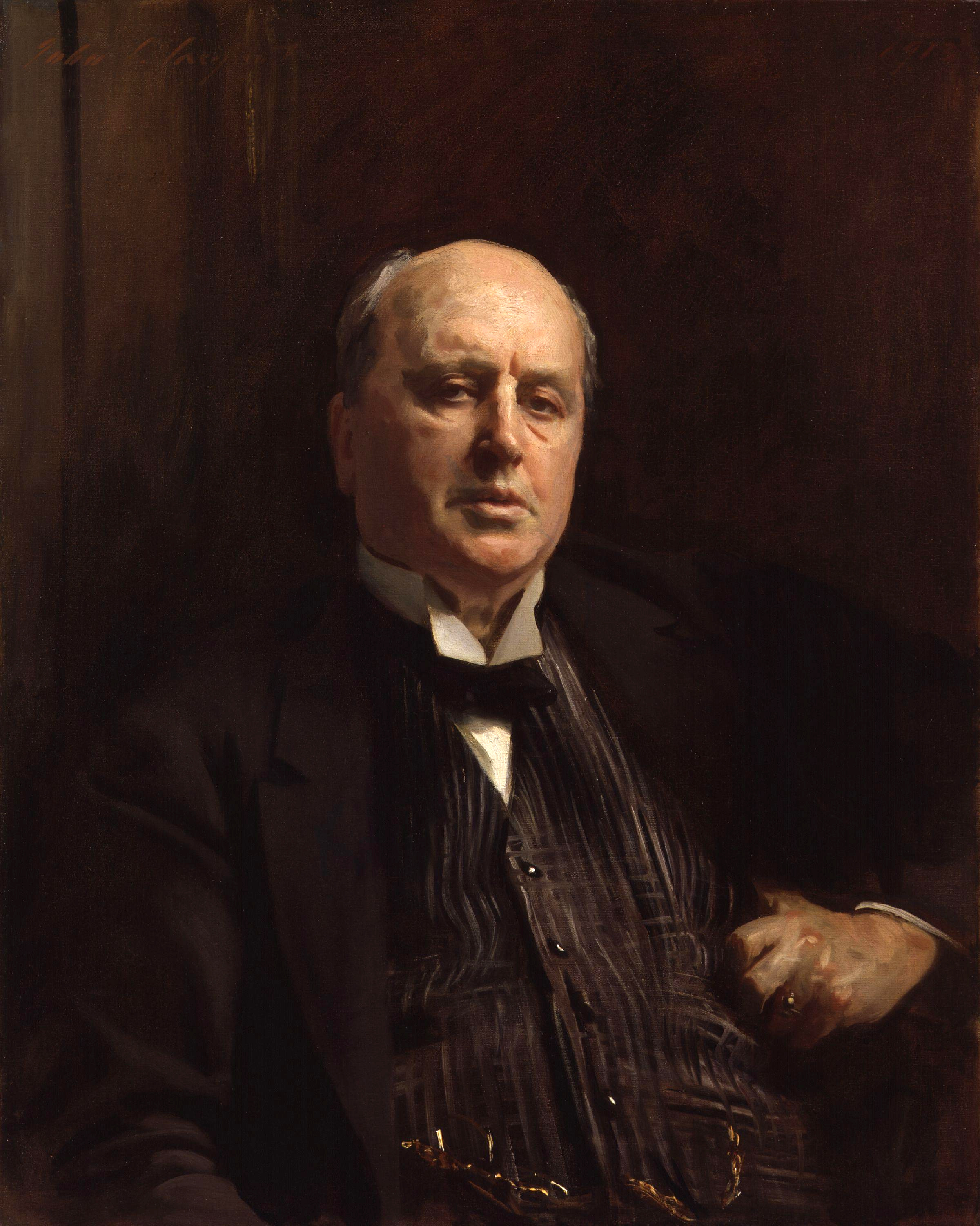
- Portrait of Henry James by John Singer Sargent, 1913
- Born: 15 April 1843; Manhattan, New York City, New York, U.S.
- Died: 28 February 1916 (aged 72); Chelsea, London, England
- Citizenship: American (1843–1915); British (1915–1916)
- Education: Harvard University
- Occupation: Writer
- Relatives: Henry James Sr. (father); William James (brother); Alice James (sister)
- Writing career
- Period: 1863–1916
- Notable works: Roderick Hudson (1875); The American (1877); Daisy Miller (1879); Washington Square (1880); The Portrait of a Lady (1881); The Bostonians (1886); The Aspern Papers (1888); What Maisie Knew (1897); The Turn of the Screw (1898); The Wings of the Dove (1902); The Ambassadors (1903); The Golden Bowl (1904)

Signature
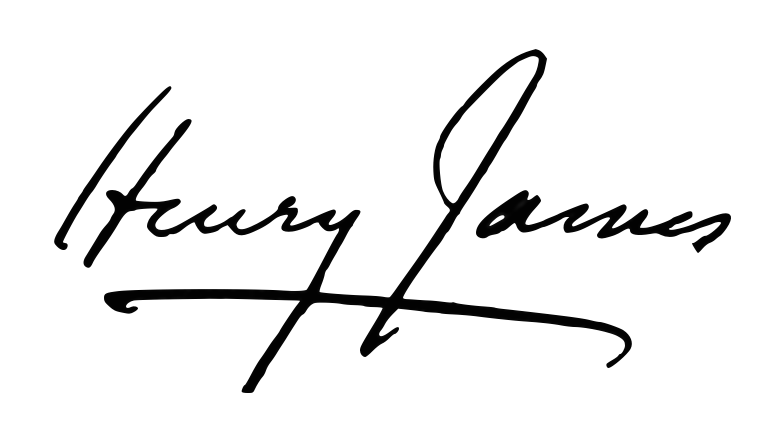

Henry James (15 April 1843 – 28 February 1916) was an American-British author. He is regarded as a key transitional figure between literary realism and literary modernism, and is considered by many to be among the greatest novelists in the English language. He was the son of theologian Henry James Sr. and the brother of philosopher and psychologist William James and diarist Alice James.

James's novels deal with the social and marital interplay between émigré Americans, the English, and continental Europeans, such as The Portrait of a Lady (1881). His later works, such as The Wings of the Dove (1902), The Ambassadors (1903), and The Golden Bowl (1904) were increasingly experimental. In describing the internal states of mind and social dynamics of his characters, James often wrote in a style in which ambiguous or contradictory motives and impressions were overlaid or juxtaposed in the discussion of a character's psyche. For their unique ambiguity, as well as for other aspects of their composition, his late works have been described as Impressionist.

His novella The Turn of the Screw (1898) has garnered a reputation as the most analysed and ambiguous ghost story in the English language and remains his most widely adapted work in other media. He wrote other highly regarded ghost stories, such as "The Jolly Corner" (1908).

James published articles and books of criticism, travel, biography, autobiography, and plays. Born in the United States, he spent much of his life abroad. James largely relocated to Europe in his thirties, and eventually settled in England, becoming a British citizen in 1915, a year before his death. James was nominated for the Nobel Prize in Literature in 1911, 1912, and 1916. Jorge Luis Borges said, "I have visited some literatures of East and West; I have compiled an encyclopedic compendium of fantastic literature; I have translated Kafka, Melville, and Bloy; I know of no stranger work than that of Henry James."

== Life ==
=== Early years, 1843–1883 ===
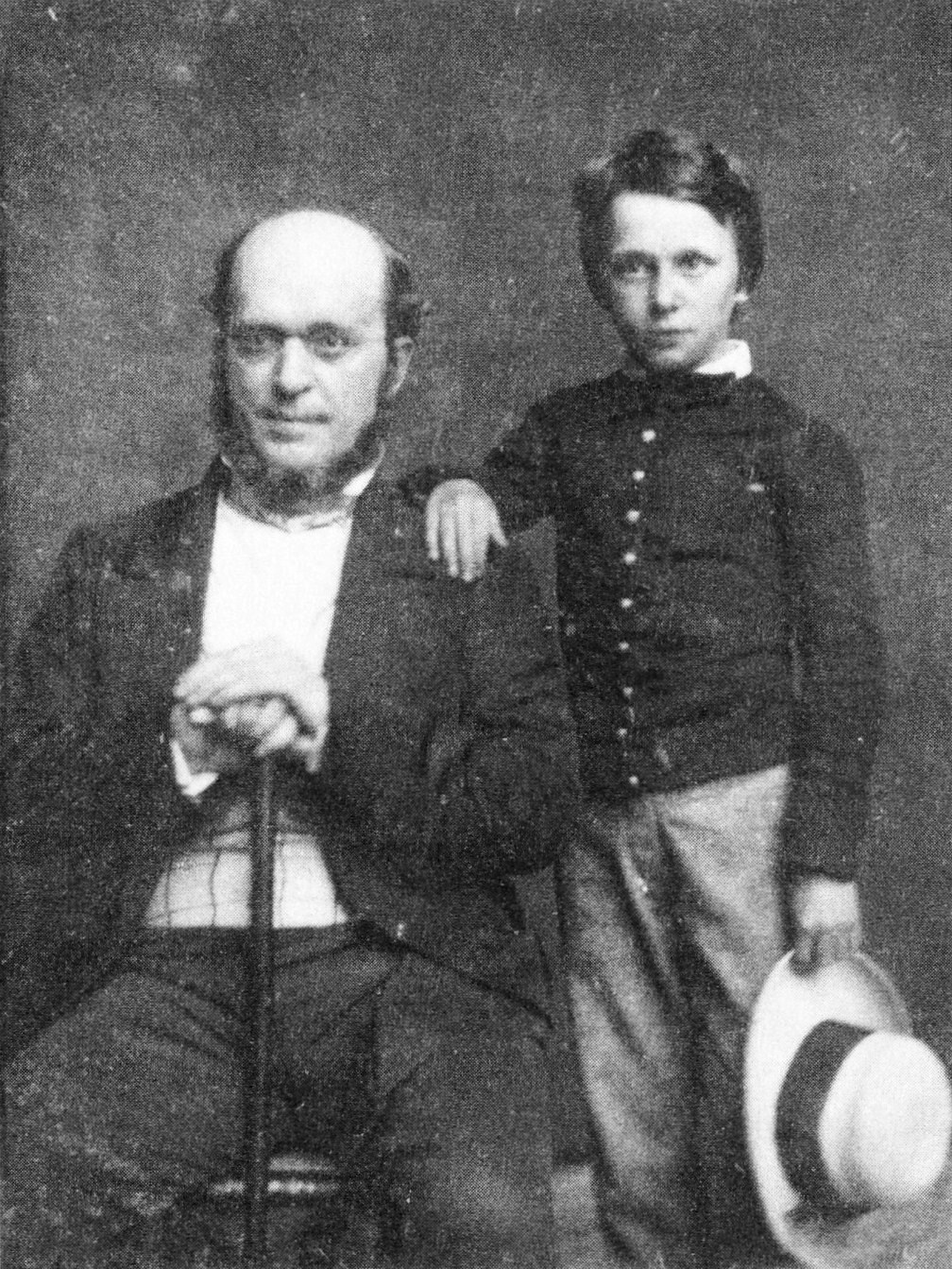
Henry James, age 11, with his father, Henry James Sr. – 1854 daguerreotype by Mathew Brady

James was born at 21 Washington Place (near Washington Square) in the borough of Manhattan in New York City, on 15 April 1843. His parents were Mary Walsh and Henry James Sr. His father was intelligent and steadfastly congenial. He was a lecturer and philosopher who had inherited independent means from his father, William James, a farmer from Corkish, County Cavan, Ireland, who had emigrated to Albany, New York, and became the second richest man in the state after John Jacob Astor through banking and real estate. Mary came from a wealthy family long settled in New York City. Her sister Katherine lived with her adult family for an extended period of time. Henry Jr. was one of four boys, the others being William, who was one year his senior, and younger brothers Garth Wilkinson (Wilkie) and Robertson. His younger sister was Alice. Both of his parents were of Irish and Scottish descent.

Before he was a year old, his father sold the house at Washington Place and took the family to Europe, where they lived for a time in a cottage in Windsor Great Park in England. The family returned to New York in 1845, and Henry spent much of his childhood living between his paternal grandmother's home in Albany and a house on 58 West Fourteenth Street in Manhattan. A painting of a view of Florence by Thomas Cole hung in the front parlour of this house on West Fourteenth. His education was calculated by his father to expose him to many influences, primarily scientific and philosophical; it was described by Percy Lubbock, the editor of his selected letters, as "extraordinarily haphazard and promiscuous." Once, a cousin of the James family came down to the house in Fourteenth Street and, one evening during his stay, read the first instalment of David Copperfield aloud to the elders of the family: Henry Junior had sneaked down from his bedroom to listen surreptitiously to the reading, until a scene involving the Murdstones led him to "loud[ly] sob," whereupon he was discovered and sent back to bed.

Between 1855 and 1860, the James household travelled to London, Paris, Geneva, Boulogne-sur-Mer, Bonn, and Newport, Rhode Island, according to the father's current interests and publishing ventures, retreating to the United States when funds were low. The James family arrived in Paris in July 1855 and took rooms at a hotel in the Rue de la Paix. Some time between 1856 and 1857, when William was fourteen and Henry thirteen, the two brothers visited the Louvre and the Luxembourg Palace. Henry studied primarily with tutors, and briefly attended schools while the family travelled in Europe. A tutor of the James children in Paris, M. Lerambert, had written a volume of verse that was well reviewed by Charles Augustin Sainte-Beuve. Their longest stays were in France, where Henry began to feel at home and became fluent in French. He had a stutter, which seems to have manifested itself only when he spoke English; in French, he did not stutter.

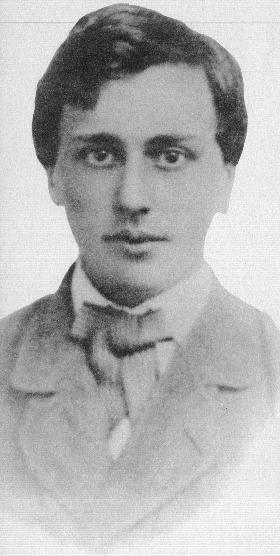
James, age 16

In the summer of 1857, the James family went to Boulogne-sur-Mer, where they set up house at No. 20 Rue Neuve Chaussée, and where Henry was a regular customer at an English lending library. In the autumn of that year, Henry Senior wrote from Boulogne to a friend that "Henry is not so fond of study, properly so-called, as of reading ... He is a devourer of libraries, and an immense writer of novels and dramas. He has considerable talent as a writer, but I am at a loss to know whether he will ever accomplish much." William recorded in a letter to their parents in Paris, while the boys were staying in Bonn, that Henry and Garth Wilkinson would wrestle "when study has made them dull and sleepy."

In 1860, the family returned to Newport in the United States. There, Henry befriended Thomas Sergeant Perry, who was to become a celebrated literary academic in adulthood, and painter John La Farge, for whom Henry sat as a subject, and who introduced him to French literature, and in particular, to Balzac. James later called Balzac his "greatest master", and said that he had learned more about the craft of fiction from him than from anyone else.

In July 1861, Henry and Thomas Sergeant Perry paid a visit to an encampment of wounded and invalid Union soldiers on the Rhode Island shore, at Portsmouth Grove; he took walks and had conversations with numerous soldiers and in later years compared this experience to those of Walt Whitman as a volunteer nurse. In the autumn of 1861, James received an injury, probably to his back, while fighting a fire. This injury, which resurfaced at times throughout his life, made him unfit for military service in the American Civil War. His younger brothers Garth Wilkinson James and Robertson James, however, both served, with Garth Wilkinson James serving as an officer in the 54th Massachusetts.

In 1864, the James family moved to Boston, Massachusetts, to be near William, who had enrolled first in the Lawrence Scientific School at Harvard and then in the medical school. In 1862, Henry attended Harvard Law School, but realised that he was not interested in studying law. He pursued his interest in literature and associated with authors and critics William Dean Howells and Charles Eliot Norton in Boston and Cambridge, Massachusetts, and formed lifelong friendships with Oliver Wendell Holmes Jr., the future Supreme Court justice, and with James T. Fields and Annie Adams Fields, his first professional mentors. In 1865, Louisa May Alcott visited Boston and dined with the James family; she later wrote in her journals that "Henry Jr. ... was very friendly. Being a literary youth he gave me advice, as if he had been eighty, and I a girl."

His first published work was a review of a stage performance, "Miss Maggie Mitchell in Fanchon the Cricket", published in 1863. About a year later, "A Tragedy of Error", his first short story, was published anonymously. James's first literary payment was for an appreciation of Sir Walter Scott's novels, written for the North American Review. He wrote fiction and nonfiction pieces for The Nation and Atlantic Monthly, where Fields was editor. In 1865, Edwin Lawrence Godkin, the founder of The Nation, visited the James family at their Boston residence in Ashburton Place; the purpose of his visit was to solicit contributions from Henry Senior and Henry Junior for the inaugural issue of the journal. Henry Junior was later to describe his friendship with Godkin as "one of the longest and happiest of my life." In 1871, he published his first novel, Watch and Ward, in serial form in the Atlantic Monthly. The novel was later published in book form in 1878.

During a 14-month trip through Europe in 1869–70, he met John Ruskin, Charles Dickens, Matthew Arnold, William Morris, and George Eliot. Rome impressed him profoundly. "Here I am then in the Eternal City", he wrote to his brother William. "At last—for the first time—I live!" He attempted to support himself as a freelance writer in Rome and then secured a position as Paris correspondent for the New York Tribune through the influence of its editor, John Hay. When these efforts failed, he returned to New York City. During 1874 and 1875, he published Transatlantic Sketches, A Passionate Pilgrim and Roderick Hudson. In 1875, James wrote for The Nation every week; he received anywhere from $3 to $10 for brief paragraphs, $12 to $25 for book reviews and $25 to $40 for travel articles and lengthier items. During this early period in his career, he was influenced by Nathaniel Hawthorne.

In the fall of 1875, he moved to the Latin Quarter of Paris. Aside from two extended returns to America, he spent the next three decades in Europe. In Paris, he met Flaubert, Zola, Daudet, Maupassant, Turgenev and others. He stayed in Paris only a year before settling in London, where he established relationships with Macmillan and other publishers, who paid for serial installments that they published in book form. The audience for these serialised novels was largely made up of middle-class women, and James struggled to fashion serious literary work within the strictures imposed by editors' and publishers' notions of what was suitable for young women to read. He lived in rented rooms, but was able to join gentlemen's clubs that had libraries and where he could entertain male friends. He was introduced to English society by Henry Adams and Charles Milnes Gaskell, the latter introducing him to the Travellers' and the Reform Clubs. He was also an honorary member of the Savile Club, St James's Club and, in 1882, the Athenaeum Club.

In England, he met the leading figures of politics and culture. He continued to be a prolific writer, producing The American (1877), The Europeans (1878), a revision of Watch and Ward (1878), French Poets and Novelists (1878), Hawthorne (1879), and several shorter works of fiction. In 1878, Daisy Miller established his fame on both sides of the Atlantic. It drew notice perhaps mostly because it depicted a woman whose behaviour is outside the social norms of Europe. He also began his first masterpiece, The Portrait of a Lady, which appeared in 1881.

In 1877, he first visited Wenlock Abbey in Shropshire, home of his friend Charles Milnes Gaskell, whom he had met through Henry Adams. He was much inspired by the darkly romantic abbey and the surrounding countryside, which feature in his essay "Abbeys and Castles". In particular, the gloomy monastic fishponds behind the abbey are said to have inspired the lake in The Turn of the Screw.

While living in London, James continued to follow the careers of the French realists, Émile Zola in particular. Their stylistic methods influenced his own work in the years to come. Hawthorne's influence on him faded during this period, replaced by George Eliot and Ivan Turgenev. The period from 1878 to 1881 had the publication of The Europeans, Washington Square, Confidence and The Portrait of a Lady.

The period from 1882 to 1883 was marked by several losses. His mother died in January 1882, while James was in Washington, D.C., on an extended visit to America. He returned to his parents' home in Cambridge, where he was together with all four of his siblings for the first time in 15 years. He returned to Europe in mid-1882, but was back in America by the end of the year following the death of his father. His brother Garth Wilkinson James and friend Turgenev both died in 1883.

=== Middle years, 1884–1897 ===
In 1884, James made another visit to Paris, where he met again with Zola, Daudet, and Goncourt. He had been following the careers of the French "realist" or "naturalist" writers, and was increasingly influenced by them. In 1886, he published The Bostonians and The Princess Casamassima, both influenced by the French writers that he had studied assiduously. Critical reaction and sales were poor. He wrote to Howells that the books had hurt his career rather than helped because they had "reduced the desire, and demand, for my productions to zero". During this time, he became friends with Robert Louis Stevenson, John Singer Sargent, Edmund Gosse, George du Maurier, Paul Bourget, and Constance Fenimore Woolson. His third novel from the 1880s was The Tragic Muse. Although he was following the precepts of Zola in his novels of the '80s, their tone and attitude are closer to the fiction of Alphonse Daudet. The lack of critical and financial success for his novels during this period led him to try writing for the theatre.

In the last quarter of 1889, "for pure and copious lucre," he started translating Port Tarascon, the third volume of Daudet's adventures of Tartarin of Tarascon. Serialized in Harper's Monthly from June 1890, this translation – praised as "clever" by The Spectator – was published in January 1891 by Sampson Low, Marston, Searle & Rivington.

After the stage failure of Guy Domville in 1895, James was near despair and thoughts of death plagued him. His depression was compounded by the deaths of those closest to him, including his sister Alice in 1892; his friend Wolcott Balestier in 1891; and Stevenson and Fenimore Woolson in 1894. The sudden death of Fenimore Woolson in January 1894, and the speculations of suicide surrounding her death, were particularly painful for him. Leon Edel wrote that the reverberations from Fenimore Woolson's death were such that "we can read a strong element of guilt and bewilderment in his letters, and, even more, in those extraordinary tales of the next half-dozen years, "The Altar of the Dead" and "The Beast in the Jungle".

The years spent on dramatic works were not entirely a loss. As he moved into the last phase of his career, he found ways to adapt dramatic techniques into the novel form. In the late 1880s and throughout the 1890s, James made several trips through Europe. He spent a long stay in Italy in 1887. In 1888, he published the short novel The Aspern Papers and The Reverberator.

=== Late years, 1898–1916 ===
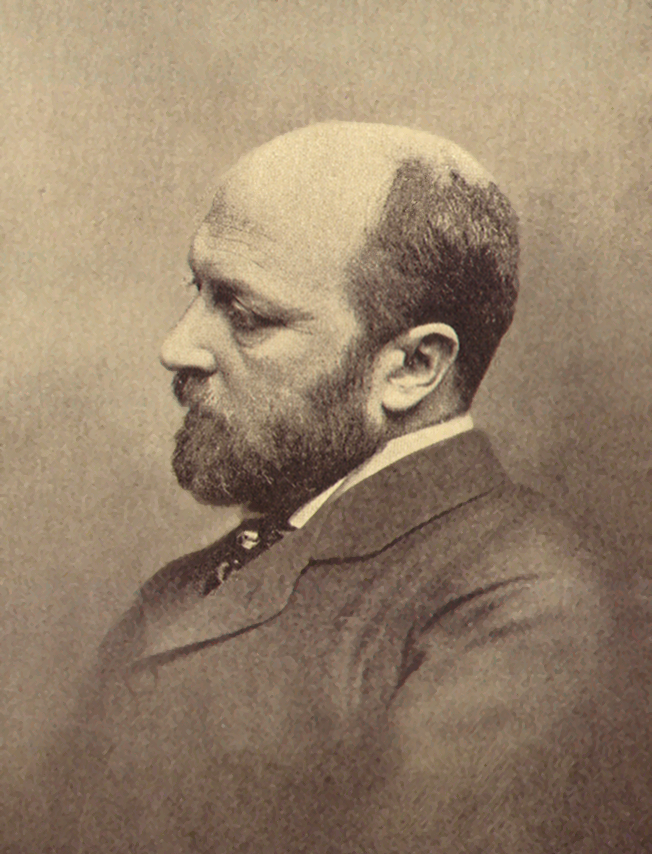
James in 1890

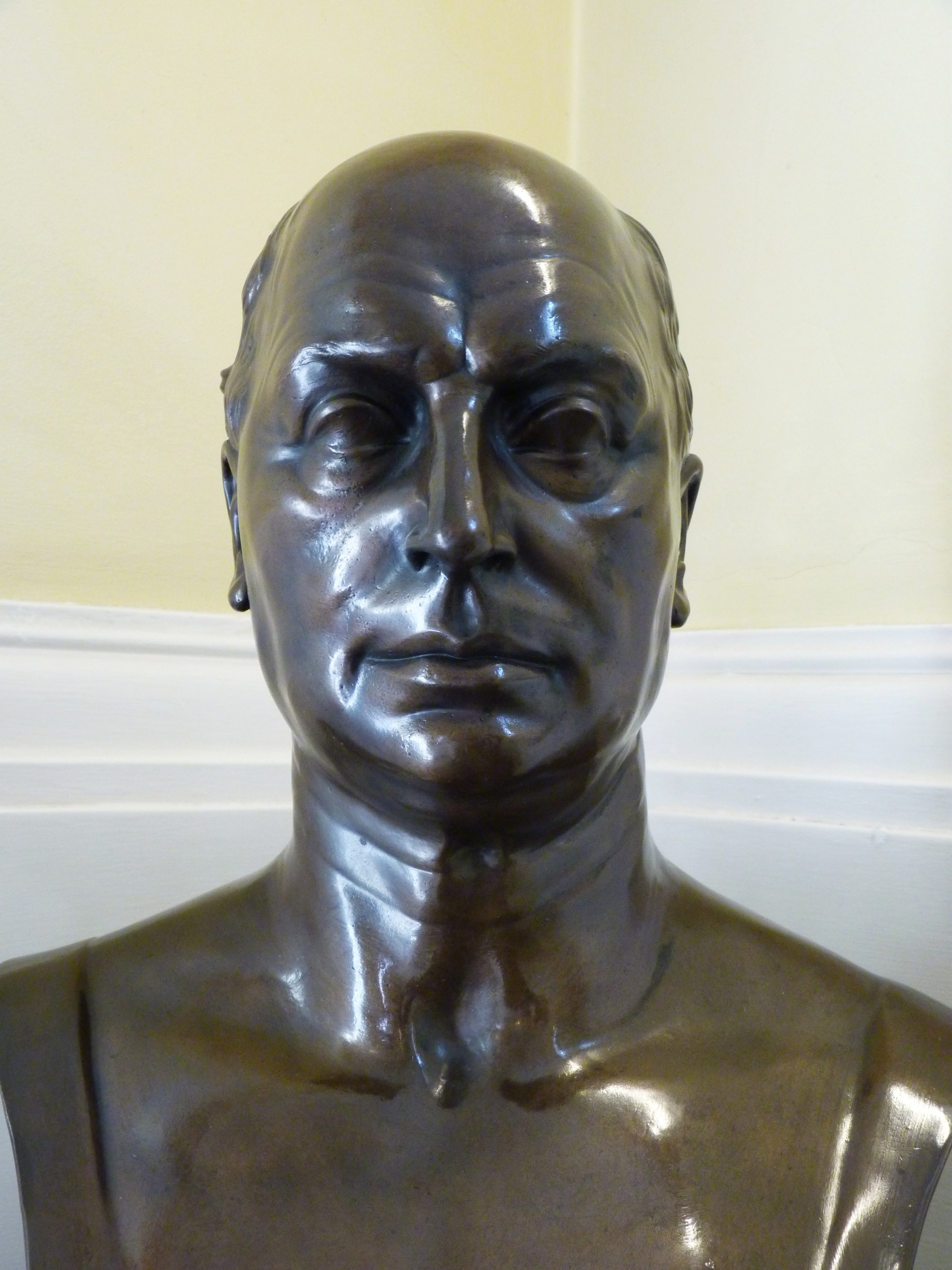
Copy of 1913 statue of Henry James by Francis Derwent Wood, displayed at Chelsea Library.
(Original statue was stolen in 1992.)

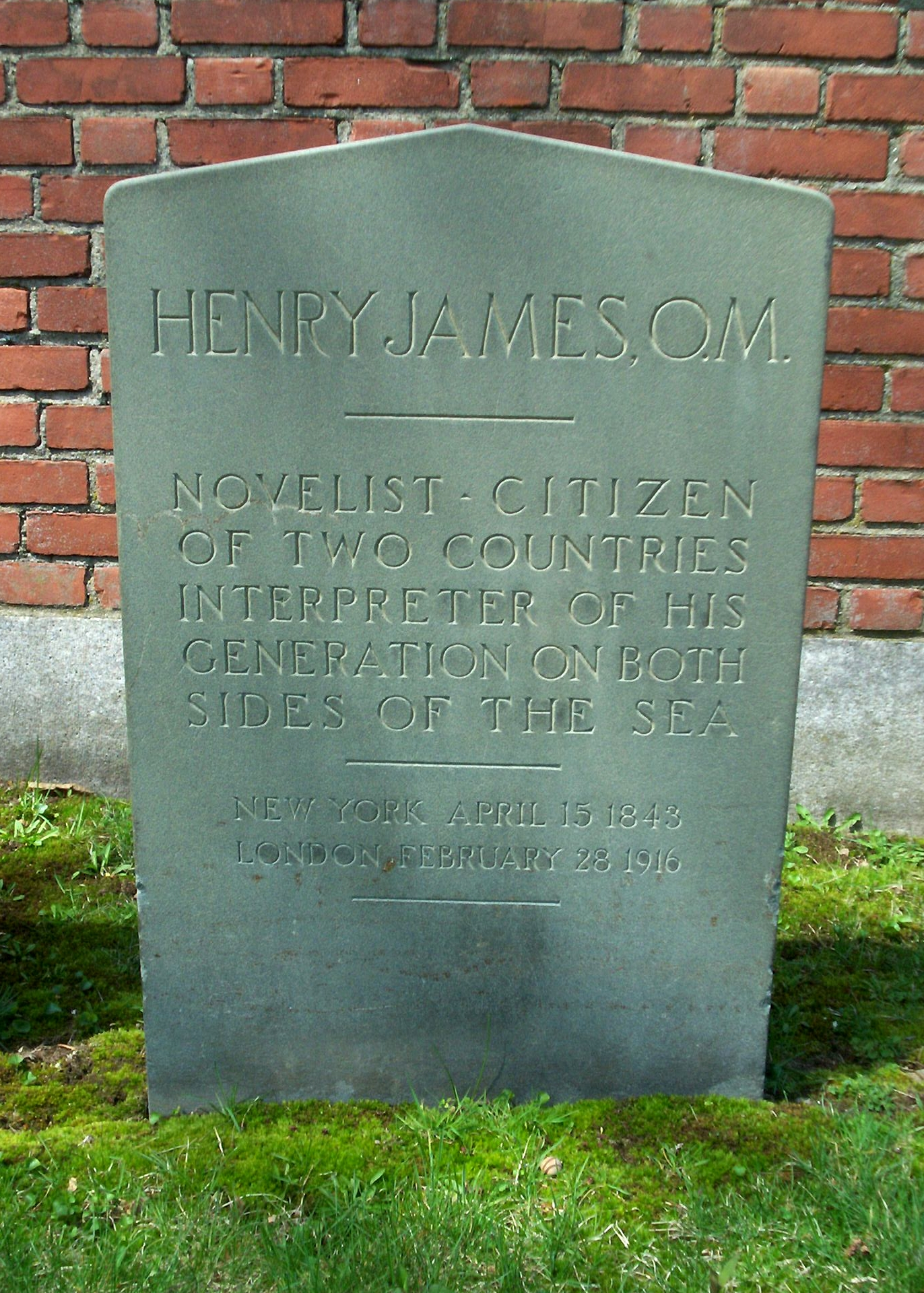
Grave marker in Cambridge Cemetery, Cambridge, Massachusetts

In 1897–1898, he moved to Rye, Sussex and wrote The Turn of the Screw; 1899–1900 had the publication of The Awkward Age and The Sacred Fount. During 1902–1904, he wrote The Wings of the Dove, The Ambassadors, and The Golden Bowl.

In 1904, he revisited America and lectured on Balzac. In 1906–1910, he published The American Scene and edited the "New York Edition", a 24-volume collection of his works. In 1910, his brother William died; Henry had just joined William from an unsuccessful search for relief in Europe, on what turned out to be Henry's last visit to the United States (summer 1910 to July 1911) and was near him when he died.

In 1913, he wrote his autobiographies, A Small Boy and Others and Notes of a Son and Brother. After the outbreak of the First World War in 1914, he did war work. In 1915, he became a British citizen and was awarded the Order of Merit the following year. He died on 28 February 1916, in Chelsea, London, and was cremated at Golders Green Crematorium. A memorial was built to him in Chelsea Old Church. He had requested that his ashes be buried in Cambridge Cemetery in Massachusetts. This was not legally possible, but William's wife smuggled his ashes onboard a ship and sneaked them through customs, allowing her to bury him in their family plot.

=== Sexuality ===
James regularly rejected suggestions that he should marry, and after settling in London, proclaimed himself "a bachelor". F. W. Dupee, in several volumes on the James family, originated the theory that he had been in love with his cousin, Mary ("Minnie") Temple, but that a neurotic fear of sex kept him from admitting such affections: "James's invalidism ... was itself the symptom of some fear of or scruple against sexual love on his part." Dupee used an episode from James's memoir, A Small Boy and Others, recounting a dream of a Napoleonic image in the Louvre, to exemplify James's romanticism about Europe, a Napoleonic fantasy into which he fled.

Between 1953 and 1972, Leon Edel wrote a major five-volume biography of James, which used unpublished letters and documents after Edel gained the permission of James's family. Edel's portrayal of James included the suggestion he was celibate, a view first propounded by critic Saul Rosenzweig in 1943. In 1996, Sheldon M. Novick published Henry James: The Young Master, followed by Henry James: The Mature Master (2007). The first book "caused something of an uproar in Jamesian circles" as it challenged the previous received notion of celibacy, a once-familiar paradigm in biographies of homosexuals when direct evidence was nonexistent. Novick also criticised Edel for following the discounted interpretation of homosexuality "as a kind of failure." The difference of opinion erupted in a series of exchanges between Edel (and later Fred Kaplan filling in for Edel) and Novick, which were published by the online magazine Slate, with Novick arguing that even the suggestion of celibacy went against James's own injunction "live!"—not "fantasize!"

A letter James wrote in old age to Hugh Walpole has been cited as an explicit statement of this. Walpole confessed to him of indulging in "high jinks", and James wrote a reply endorsing it: "We must know, as much as possible, in our beautiful art, yours & mine, what we are talking about—& the only way to know it is to have lived & loved & cursed & floundered & enjoyed & suffered—I don't think I regret a single 'excess' of my responsive youth".

The interpretation of James as living a less austere emotional life has been subsequently explored by other scholars. The often intense politics of Jamesian scholarship has also been the subject of studies. Author Colm Tóibín has said that Eve Kosofsky Sedgwick's Epistemology of the Closet made a landmark difference to Jamesian scholarship by arguing that he be read as a homosexual writer whose desire to keep his sexuality a secret shaped his layered style and dramatic artistry. According to Tóibín, such a reading "removed James from the realm of dead white males who wrote about posh people. He became our contemporary."

James's letters to expatriate American sculptor Hendrik Christian Andersen have attracted particular attention. James met the 27-year-old Andersen in Rome in 1899, when James was 56, and wrote letters to Andersen that are intensely emotional: "I hold you, dearest boy, in my innermost love, & count on your feeling me—in every throb of your soul". In a letter of 6 May 1904, to his brother William, James referred to himself as "always your hopelessly celibate even though sexagenarian Henry". How accurate that description might have been is the subject of contention among James's biographers, but the letters to Andersen were occasionally quasierotic: "I put, my dear boy, my arm around you, & feel the pulsation, thereby, as it were, of our excellent future & your admirable endowment."

His numerous letters to the many young homosexual men among his close male friends are more forthcoming. To his homosexual friend Howard Sturgis, James could write: "I repeat, almost to indiscretion, that I could live with you. Meanwhile, I can only try to live without you." In another letter to Sturgis, following a long visit, James refers jocularly to their "happy little congress of two". In letters to Hugh Walpole, he pursues convoluted jokes and puns about their relationship, referring to himself as an elephant who "paws you oh so benevolently" and winds about Walpole his "well-meaning old trunk". His letters to Walter Berry printed by the Black Sun Press have been known for their lightly veiled eroticism.

However, James corresponded in equally extravagant language with his many female friends, writing, for example, to fellow novelist Lucy Clifford: "Dearest Lucy! What shall I say? when I love you so very, very much, and see you nine times for once that I see Others! Therefore I think that—if you want it made clear to the meanest intelligence—I love you more than I love Others." To his New York friend Mary Cadwalader Rawle Jones: "Dearest Mary Cadwalader. I yearn over you, but I yearn in vain; & your long silence really breaks my heart, mystifies, depresses, almost alarms me, to the point even of making me wonder if poor unconscious & doting old Célimare [Jones's pet name for James] has 'done' anything, in some dark somnambulism of the spirit, which has ... given you a bad moment, or a wrong impression, or a 'colourable pretext' ... However these things may be, he loves you as tenderly as ever; nothing, to the end of time, will ever detach him from you, & he remembers those Eleventh St. matutinal intimes hours, those telephonic matinées, as the most romantic of his life..." His long friendship with American novelist Constance Fenimore Woolson, in whose house he lived for a number of weeks in Italy in 1887, and his shock and grief over her suicide in 1894, are discussed in detail in Edel's biography and play a central role in a study by Lyndall Gordon. Edel conjectured that Woolson was in love with James and killed herself in part because of his coldness, but Woolson's biographers have objected to Edel's account.

== Works ==
=== Style and themes ===
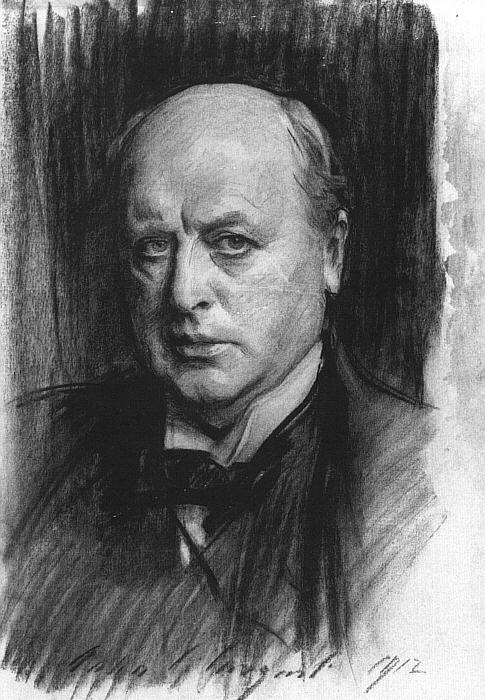
Portrait of Henry James, charcoal drawing by John Singer Sargent (1912)

James is one of the major figures of trans-Atlantic literature. His works frequently juxtapose characters from the Old World (Europe), embodying a feudal civilisation that is beautiful, often corrupt, and alluring, and from the New World (United States), where people are often brash, open, and assertive, and embody the virtues of the new American society—particularly personal freedom and a more exacting moral character. James explores this clash of personalities and cultures, in stories of personal relationships in which power is exercised well or badly.

His protagonists were often young American women facing oppression or abuse, and as his secretary Theodora Bosanquet remarked in her monograph Henry James at Work:

When he walked out of the refuge of his study and into the world and looked around him, he saw a place of torment, where creatures of prey perpetually thrust their claws into the quivering flesh of doomed, defenseless children of light ... His novels are a repeated exposure of this wickedness, a reiterated and passionate plea for the fullest freedom of development, unimperiled by reckless and barbarous stupidity.

Philip Guedalla jokingly described three phases in the development of James's prose: "James I, James II, and The Old Pretender," and observers do often group his works of fiction into three periods. In his apprentice years, culminating with the masterwork The Portrait of a Lady, his style was simple and direct (by the standards of Victorian magazine writing) and he experimented widely with forms and methods, generally narrating from a conventionally omniscient point of view. Plots generally concern romance, except for the three big novels of social commentary that conclude this period. In the second period, as noted above, he abandoned the serialised novel and from 1890 to about 1897, he wrote short stories and plays. Finally, in his third and last period he returned to the long, serialised novel. Beginning in the second period, but most noticeably in the third, he increasingly abandoned direct statement in favour of frequent double negatives, and complex descriptive imagery. Single paragraphs began to run for page after page, in which an initial noun would be succeeded by pronouns surrounded by clouds of adjectives and prepositional clauses, far from their original referents, and verbs would be deferred and then preceded by a series of adverbs. The overall effect could be a vivid evocation of a scene as perceived by a sensitive observer. It has been debated whether this change of style was engendered by James's shifting from writing to dictating to a typist, a change made during the composition of What Maisie Knew.

In its intense focus on the consciousness of his major characters, James's later work foreshadows extensive developments in 20th-century fiction. (Note: See James's prefaces, Horne's study of his revisions for The New York Edition, Edward Wagenknecht's The Novels of Henry James (1983) among many discussions of the changes in James's narrative technique and style over the course of his career.) Indeed, he might have influenced stream-of-consciousness writers such as Virginia Woolf, who not only read some of his novels but also wrote essays about them. Both contemporary and modern readers have found the late style difficult and unnecessary; his friend Edith Wharton, who admired him greatly, said that some passages in his work were all but incomprehensible. James was harshly portrayed by H. G. Wells as a hippopotamus laboriously attempting to pick up a pea that had got into a corner of its cage. The "late James" style was ably parodied by Max Beerbohm in "The Mote in the Middle Distance".

More important for his work overall may have been his position as an expatriate, and in other ways an outsider, living in Europe. While he came from middle-class and provincial beginnings (seen from the perspective of European polite society), he worked very hard to gain access to all levels of society, and the settings of his fiction range from working-class to aristocratic, and often describe the efforts of middle-class Americans to make their way in European capitals. He confessed he got some of his best story ideas from gossip at the dinner table or at country house weekends. (Note: James's prefaces to the New York Edition of his fiction often discuss such origins for his stories. See, for instance, the preface to The Spoils of Poynton.) He worked for a living, however, and lacked the experiences of select schools, university, and army service, the common bonds of masculine society. He was furthermore a man whose tastes and interests were, according to the prevailing standards of Victorian era Anglo-American culture, rather feminine, and who was shadowed by the cloud of prejudice that then and later accompanied suspicions of his homosexuality. (Note: James himself noted his "outsider" status. In a letter of 2 October 1901, to W. Morton Fullerton, James talked of the "essential loneliness of my life" as "the deepest thing" about him.) Edmund Wilson compared James's objectivity to Shakespeare's:

One would be in a position to appreciate James better if one compared him with the dramatists of the seventeenth century—Racine and Molière, whom he resembles in form as well as in point of view, and even Shakespeare, when allowances are made for the most extreme differences in subject and form. These poets are not, like Dickens and Hardy, writers of melodrama—either humorous or pessimistic, nor secretaries of society like Balzac, nor prophets like Tolstoy: they are occupied simply with the presentation of conflicts of moral character, which they do not concern themselves about softening or averting. They do not indict society for these situations: they regard them as universal and inevitable. They do not even blame God for allowing them: they accept them as the conditions of life.

Many of James's stories may also be seen as psychological thought experiments about selection. In his preface to the New York edition of The American, James describes the development of the story in his mind as exactly such: the "situation" of an American, "some robust but insidiously beguiled and betrayed, some cruelly wronged, compatriot ..." with the focus of the story being on the response of this wronged man. The Portrait of a Lady may be an experiment to see what happens when an idealistic young woman suddenly becomes very rich. In many of his tales, characters seem to exemplify alternative futures and possibilities, as most markedly in "The Jolly Corner", in which the protagonist and a ghost-doppelganger live alternative American and European lives; and in others, like The Ambassadors, an older James seems fondly to regard his own younger self facing a crucial moment.

=== Major novels ===
The first period of James's fiction, usually considered to have culminated in The Portrait of a Lady, concentrated on the contrast between Europe and America. The style of these novels is generally straightforward and, though personally characteristic, well within the norms of 19th-century fiction. Roderick Hudson (1875) is a Künstlerroman that traces the development of the title character, an extremely talented sculptor. Although the book shows some signs of immaturity—this was James's first serious attempt at a full-length novel—it has attracted favourable comment due to the vivid realisation of the three major characters: Roderick Hudson, superbly gifted but unstable and unreliable; Rowland Mallet, Roderick's limited but much more mature friend and patron; and Christina Light, one of James's most enchanting and maddening femmes fatales. The pair of Hudson and Mallet has been seen as representing the two sides of James's own nature: the wildly imaginative artist and the brooding conscientious mentor.

In The Portrait of a Lady (1881), James concluded the first phase of his career with a novel that remains his most popular piece of long fiction. The story is of a spirited young American woman, Isabel Archer, who "affronts her destiny" and finds it overwhelming. She inherits a large amount of money and subsequently becomes the victim of Machiavellian scheming by two American expatriates. The narrative is set mainly in Europe, especially in England and Italy. Generally regarded as the masterpiece of his early phase, The Portrait of a Lady is described as a psychological novel, exploring the minds of his characters, and almost a work of social science, exploring the differences between Europeans and Americans, the old and the new worlds.

The second period of James's career, which extends from the publication of The Portrait of a Lady through the end of the 19th century, features less popular novels, including The Princess Casamassima, published serially in The Atlantic Monthly in 1885–1886, and The Bostonians, published serially in The Century during the same period. This period also featured James's celebrated Gothic novella, The Turn of the Screw (1898).

The third period of James's career reached its most significant achievement in three novels published just around the start of the 20th century: The Wings of the Dove (1902), The Ambassadors (1903), and The Golden Bowl (1904). Critic F. O. Matthiessen called this "trilogy" James's major phase, and these novels have certainly received intense critical study. The second-written of the books, The Wings of the Dove, was the first published because it was not serialised. This novel tells the story of Milly Theale, an American heiress stricken with a serious disease, and her impact on the people around her. Some of these people befriend Milly with honourable motives, while others are more self-interested. James stated in his autobiographical books that Milly was based on Minny Temple, his beloved cousin, who died at an early age of tuberculosis. He said that he attempted in the novel to wrap her memory in the "beauty and dignity of art".

=== Shorter narratives ===
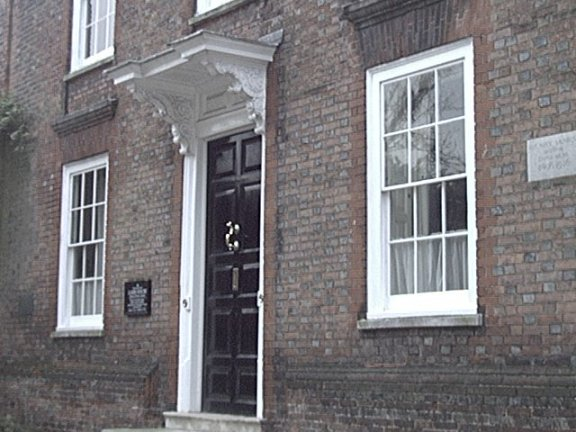
Lamb House in Rye, East Sussex, where James lived from 1897 to 1914

James was particularly interested in what he called the "beautiful and blest nouvelle", or the longer form of short narrative. Still, he produced a number of very short stories in which he achieved notable compression of sometimes complex subjects. The following narratives are representative of James's achievement in the shorter forms of fiction.

- "A Tragedy of Error" (1864), short story
- "The Story of a Year" (1865), short story
- A Passionate Pilgrim (1871), novella
- Madame de Mauves (1874), novella
- Daisy Miller (1878), novella
- Foreign Parts (1883)
- The Aspern Papers (1888), novella
- The Lesson of the Master (1888), novella
- The Pupil (1891), short story
- "The Figure in the Carpet" (1896), short story
- The Beast in the Jungle (1903), novella
- An International Episode (1878)
- Picture and Text
- Georgina's Reasons (1884), novella
- Four Meetings (1885)
- The Madonna of the Future (1887)
- Eugene Pickering (1887)
- A London Life, and Other Tales (1889)
- The Spoils of Poynton (1896)
- Embarrassments (1896)
- The Two Magics: The Turn of the Screw, Covering End (1898)
- In the Cage (1898), novella
- A Little Tour of France (1900)
- The Sacred Fount (1901)
- The Birthplace (1903)
- Views and Reviews (1908)
- The Finer Grain (1910)
- The Outcry (1911)
- Lady Barbarina: The Siege of London, An International Episode and Other Tales (1922)

=== Plays ===
At several points in his career, James wrote plays, beginning with one-act plays written for periodicals in 1869 and 1871 and a dramatisation of his popular novella Daisy Miller in 1882. From 1890 to 1892, having received a bequest that freed him from magazine publication, he made a strenuous effort to succeed on the London stage, writing a half-dozen plays, of which only one, a dramatisation of his novel The American, was produced. This play was performed for several years by a touring repertory company, and had a respectable run in London, but did not earn very much money for James. His other plays written at this time were not produced.

In 1893, however, he responded to a request from actor-manager George Alexander for a serious play for the opening of his renovated St. James's Theatre, and wrote a long drama, Guy Domville, which Alexander produced. A noisy uproar arose on the opening night, 5 January 1895, with hissing from the gallery when James took his bow after the final curtain, and the author was upset. The play received moderately good reviews and had a modest run of four weeks before being taken off to make way for Oscar Wilde's The Importance of Being Earnest, which Alexander thought would have better prospects for the coming season.

After the stresses and disappointment of these efforts, James insisted that he would write no more for the theatre, but within weeks had agreed to write a curtain-raiser for Ellen Terry. This became the one-act "Summersoft", which he later rewrote into a short story, "Covering End", and then expanded into a full-length play, The High Bid, which had a brief run in London in 1907, when James made another concerted effort to write for the stage. He wrote three new plays, two of which were in production when the death of Edward VII on 6 May 1910 plunged London into mourning and theatres closed. Discouraged by failing health and the stresses of theatrical work, James did not renew his efforts in the theatre, but recycled his plays as successful novels. The Outcry was a best-seller in the United States when it was published in 1911. During 1890–1893, when he was most engaged with the theatre, James wrote a good deal of theatrical criticism, and assisted Elizabeth Robins and others in translating and producing Henrik Ibsen for the first time in London.

Leon Edel argued in his psychoanalytic biography that James was traumatised by the opening-night uproar that greeted Guy Domville, and that it plunged him into a prolonged depression. The successful later novels, in Edel's view, were the result of a kind of self-analysis, expressed in fiction, which partly freed him from his fears. Other biographers and scholars have not accepted this account, with the more common view being that of F. O. Matthiessen, who wrote: "Instead of being crushed by the collapse of his hopes [for the theatre] ... he felt a resurgence of new energy."

=== Nonfiction ===
Beyond his fiction, James was one of the more important literary critics in the history of the novel. In his classic essay The Art of Fiction (1884), he argued against rigid prescriptions on the novelist's choice of subject and method of treatment. He maintained that the widest possible freedom in content and approach would help ensure narrative fiction's continued vitality. James wrote many critical articles on other novelists; typical is his book-length study of Nathaniel Hawthorne, which has been the subject of critical debate. Richard Brodhead has suggested that the study was emblematic of James's struggle with Hawthorne's influence, and constituted an effort to place the elder writer "at a disadvantage." Gordon Fraser, meanwhile, has suggested that the study was part of a more commercial effort by James to introduce himself to British readers as Hawthorne's natural successor.

When James assembled the New York Edition of his fiction in his final years, he wrote a series of prefaces that subjected his own work to searching, occasionally harsh criticism.

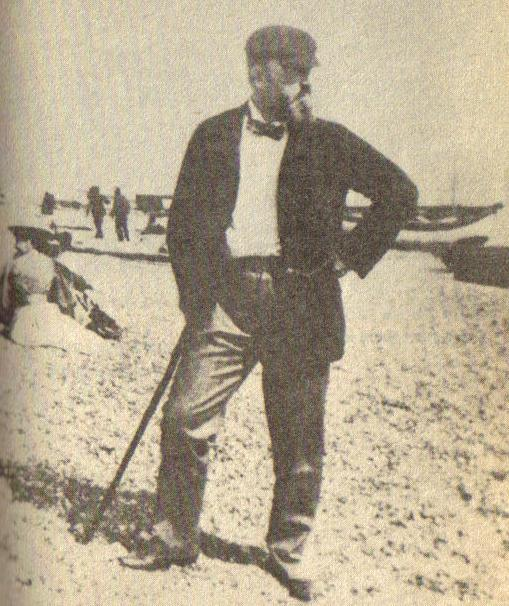
Photograph of Henry James (1897)

At 22, James wrote The Noble School of Fiction for The Nation's first issue in 1865. He wrote, in all, over 200 essays and book, art, and theatre reviews for the magazine.

For most of his life, James harboured ambitions for success as a playwright. He converted his novel The American into a play that enjoyed modest returns in the early 1890s. In all, he wrote about a dozen plays, most of which went unproduced. His costume drama Guy Domville failed disastrously on its opening night in 1895. James then largely abandoned his efforts to conquer the stage and returned to his fiction. In his Notebooks, he maintained that his theatrical experiment benefited his novels and tales by helping him dramatise his characters' thoughts and emotions. James produced a small amount of theatrical criticism, including appreciations of Henrik Ibsen. (Note: For a general discussion of James's efforts as a playwright, see Edel's referenced edition of his plays.)

With his wide-ranging artistic interests, James occasionally wrote on the visual arts. He wrote a favourable assessment of fellow expatriate John Singer Sargent, a painter whose critical status has improved markedly since the mid twentieth century. James also wrote sometimes charming, sometimes brooding articles about various places where he visited and lived. His books of travel writing include Italian Hours (an example of the charming approach) and The American Scene (on the brooding side).

James was one of the great letter-writers of any era. More than 10,000 of his personal letters are extant, and over 3,000 have been published in a large number of collections. A complete edition of James's letters began publication in 2006, edited by Pierre Walker and Greg Zacharias. As of 2014, eight volumes have been published, covering from 1855 to 1880. James's correspondents included contemporaries such as Robert Louis Stevenson, Edith Wharton, and Joseph Conrad, along with many others in his wide circle of friends and acquaintances. The content of the letters range from trivialities to serious discussions of artistic, social, and personal issues.

Very late in life, James began a series of autobiographical works: A Small Boy and Others, Notes of a Son and Brother, and the unfinished The Middle Years. These books portray the development of a classic observer who was passionately interested in artistic creation but was somewhat reticent about participating fully in the life around him.

== Reception ==
=== Criticism, biographies and fictional treatments ===
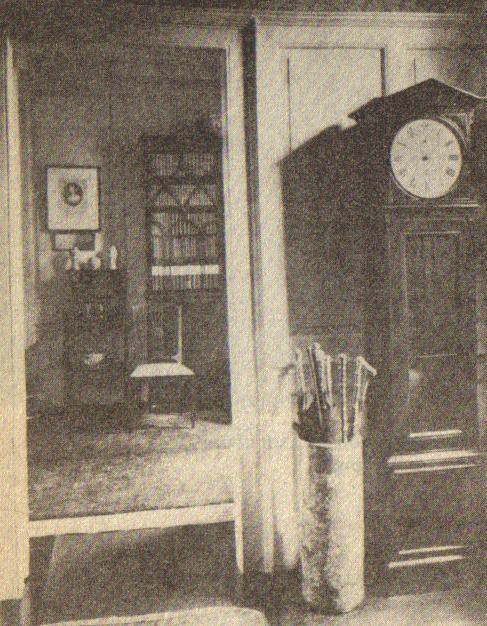
Interior view of Lamb House, James's residence from 1897 until 1914 (1898)

James's work has remained steadily popular with the limited audience of educated readers to whom he spoke during his lifetime, and has remained firmly in the canon, but after his death, some American critics, such as Van Wyck Brooks, expressed hostility towards James for his long expatriation and eventual naturalisation as a British subject. Other critics such as E. M. Forster complained about what they saw as James's squeamishness in the treatment of sex and other possibly controversial material, or dismissed his late style as difficult and obscure, relying heavily on extremely long sentences and excessively latinate language. 'Even in his lifetime,' explains scholar Hazel Hutchinson, 'James had a reputation as a difficult writer for clever readers.' Oscar Wilde criticised him for writing "fiction as if it were a painful duty". Vernon Parrington, composing a canon of American literature, condemned James for having cut himself off from America. Jorge Luis Borges wrote about him, "Despite the scruples and delicate complexities of James, his work suffers from a major defect: the absence of life." And Virginia Woolf, writing to Lytton Strachey, asked, "Please tell me what you find in Henry James. ... we have his works here, and I read, and I can't find anything but faintly tinged rose water, urbane and sleek, but vulgar and pale as Walter Lamb. Is there really any sense in it?" Novelist W. Somerset Maugham wrote, "He did not know the English as an Englishman instinctively knows them and so his English characters never to my mind quite ring true," and argued, "The great novelists, even in seclusion, have lived life passionately. Henry James was content to observe it from a window." Maugham nevertheless wrote, "The fact remains that those last novels of his, notwithstanding their unreality, make all other novels, except the very best, unreadable." Colm Tóibín observed that James "never really wrote about the English very well. His English characters don't work for me."

Despite these criticisms, James is now valued for his psychological and moral realism, his masterful creation of character, his low-key but playful humour, and his assured command of the language. In his 1983 book, The Novels of Henry James, Edward Wagenknecht offers an assessment that echoes Theodora Bosanquet's:

"To be completely great," Henry James wrote in an early review, "a work of art must lift up the heart," and his own novels do this to an outstanding degree ... More than sixty years after his death, the great novelist who sometimes professed to have no opinions stands foursquare in the great Christian humanistic and democratic tradition. The men and women who, at the height of World War II, raided the secondhand shops for his out-of-print books knew what they were about. For no writer ever raised a braver banner to which all who love freedom might adhere.

William Dean Howells saw James as a representative of a new realist school of literary art, which broke with the English romantic tradition epitomised by the works of Charles Dickens and William Thackeray. Howells wrote that realism found "its chief exemplar in Mr. James ... A novelist he is not, after the old fashion, or after any fashion but his own." F. R. Leavis championed Henry James as a novelist of "established pre-eminence" in The Great Tradition (1948), asserting that The Portrait of a Lady and The Bostonians were "the two most brilliant novels in the language." James is now prized as a master of point of view who moved literary fiction forward by insisting in showing, not telling, his stories to the reader.

== Portrayals in fiction ==
Henry James has been the subject of a number of novels and stories, including:

- Boon by H. G. Wells
- Author, Author by David Lodge
- Youth by J. M. Coetzee
- The Master by Colm Tóibín
- Hotel de Dream by Edmund White
- Lions at Lamb House by Edwin M. Yoder
- Felony by Emma Tennant
- Dictation by Cynthia Ozick
- The James Boys by Richard Liebmann-Smith
- The Open Door by Elizabeth Maguire
- The Great Divide by Rex Hunter
- The Master at St. Bartholomew's Hospital, 1914–1916 by Joyce Carol Oates
- The Typewriter's Tale by Michael Heyns
- Henry James' Midnight Song by Carol de Chellis Hill
- The Fifth Heart by Dan Simmons
- Earthly Powers by Anthony Burgess
- The Haunting of Lamb House by Joan Aiken
- Empire by Gore Vidal
- The Maze at Windermere by Gregory Blake Smith
- Ringrose the Pirate by Don Nigro

David Lodge also wrote a long essay about Henry James in his collection The Year of Henry James: The Story of a Novel.

== Adaptations ==
Henry James's stories and novels have been adapted to film, television, and music video over 150 times (some TV shows did upwards of a dozen stories) from 1933 to 2018. The majority of these are in English, but with adaptations in French (13), Spanish (7), Italian (6), German (5), Portuguese (1), Yugoslavian (1), and Swedish (1).

Those most frequently adapted include:

- The Turn of the Screw (28 times)
- The Aspern Papers (17 times)
- Washington Square (8 times), as The Heiress (6 times), as Victoria (once)
- The Wings of the Dove (9 times)
- The Beast in the Jungle (5 times)
- The Bostonians (4 times)
- Daisy Miller (4 times)
- The Sense of the Past (4 times)
- The Ambassadors (3 times)
- The Portrait of a Lady (3 times)
- The American (3 times)
- What Maisie Knew (3 times)
- The Golden Bowl (2 times)
- The Marriages (2 times)
- The Ghostly Rental (once)
- Georgina's Reasons (once)

== Collections ==
Material relating to James is found in many institutions across the world:

- Columbia University, New York holds letters from James to close friends;
- The Library of Congress holds early editions of James' works;
- The Berg Collection at New York Public Library holds manuscripts, typescripts, correspondence and diaries by James collected from various sources;
- University College London Special Collections holds correspondence from James to Charles E. Wheeler;
- The Harry Ransom Center, University of Texas at Austin holds correspondence from James largely relating to British theater;
- The Beinecke Rare Book and Manuscript Library, Yale University holds personal papers, writings, correspondence and printed material relating to James.

== Sources ==
- Harold Bloom (2009) [2001]. Henry James. Infobase Publishing, originally published by Chelsea House. ISBN 978-1-4381-1601-3.
- Jorge Luis Borges and Esther Zemborain de Torres (1971). An Introduction to American Literature. Lexington: University Press of Kentucky.
- Theodora Bosanquet (1982). Henry James at Work. Haskell House Publishers Inc. pp. 275–276. ISBN 0-8383-0009-X
- John R. Bradley, ed. (1999). Henry James and Homo-Erotic Desire. Palgrave Macmillan. ISBN 0-312-21764-1
- John R. Bradley (2000). I Henry James on Stage and Screen Palgrave Macmillan. ISBN 0-333-79214-9
- John R. Bradley (2000). Henry James's Permanent Adolescence. Palgrave Macmillan. ISBN 0-333-91874-6
- Van Wyck Brooks (1925). The Pilgrimage of Henry James
- Gabriel Brownstein (2004). "Introduction," in James, Henry. Portrait of a Lady, Barnes & Noble Classics series, Spark Educational Publishing.
- Lewis Dabney, ed. (1983). The Portable Edmund Wilson. ISBN 0-14-015098-6
- Marysa Demoor and Monty Chisholm, editors (1999). Bravest of Women and Finest of Friends: Henry James's Letters to Lucy Clifford, University of Victoria (1999), p. 79 ISBN 0-920604-67-6
- F.W. Dupee (1951). Henry James William Sloane Associates, The American Men of Letters Series.
- Leon Edel, ed. (1955). The Selected Letters of Henry James. New York: Farrar, Straus & Giroux, Vol. 1
- Leon Edel, ed. (1983). Henry James Letters.
- Leon Edel, ed. (1990). The Complete Plays of Henry James. New York: Oxford University Press. ISBN 0-19-504379-0
- E.M. Forster (1956). Aspects of the Novel ISBN 0-674-38780-5
- Gunter, Susan (2000). Dear Munificent Friends: Henry James's Letters to Four Women. University of Michigan Press. ISBN 0-472-11010-1.
- Gunter, Susan E.; Jobe, Steven H. (2001). Dearly Beloved Friends: Henry James's Letters to Younger Men. University of Michigan Press. ISBN 0-472-11009-8.
- Katrina vanden Heuvel (1990). The Nation 1865–1990, Thunder's Mouth Press. ISBN 1-56025-001-1
- James Kraft (1969). The early tales of Henry James. Southern Illinois University Press.
- Paul Lauter (2010). A companion to American literature and culture. Chichester; Malden, MA: Wiley-Blackwell. p. 364. ISBN 0-631-20892-5
- Percy Lubbock, ed. (1920). The Letters of Henry James, vol. 1. New York: Scribner.
- F. O. Matthiessen and Kenneth Murdock, editors (1981) The Notebooks of Henry James. University of Chicago Press. ISBN 0-226-51104-9
- Novick, Sheldon M (1996). Henry James: The Young Master. Random House. ISBN 0-394-58655-7.
- Sheldon M. Novick (2007). Henry James: The Mature Master. Random House. ISBN 978-0-679-45023-8.
- Ross Posnock (1987). "James, Browning, and the Theatrical Self," in Neuman, Mark and Payne, Michael. Self, sign, and symbol. Bucknell University Press.
- Powers, Lyall H (1970). Henry James: An Introduction and Interpretation. New York: Holt, Rinehart and Winston. ISBN 978-0030789557.
- Ignas Skrupskelis and Elizabeth Berkeley, editors (1994). The Correspondence of William James: Volume 3, William and Henry. 1897–1910. Charlottesville: University Press of Virginia.
- Allan Wade, ed. (1948). Henry James: The Scenic Art, Notes on Acting and the Drama 1872–1901.
- Edward Wagenknecht (1983). The Novels of Henry James.
- Edith Wharton (1925) The Writing of Fiction.
- Virginia Woolf (2003). A Writer's Diary: Being Extracts from the Diary of Virginia Woolf. Harcourt. pp. 33, 39–40, 58, 86, 215, 301, 351. ISBN 978-0-15-602791-5.
- H. G. Wells, Boon. (1915) The Mind of the Race, The Wild Asses of the Devil, and The Last Trump. London: T. Fisher Unwin p. 101.
- Rosella Mamoli Zorzi, ed. (2004). Beloved Boy: Letters to Hendrik C. Andersen, 1899–1915. University of Virginia Press. ISBN 0-8139-2270-4
