= Leon Edel =

American literary critic and historian (1907–1997)

- Born: 9 September 1907; Pittsburgh, Pennsylvania, U.S.
- Died: 5 September 1997 (aged 89); Honolulu, Hawaii, U.S.
- Occupations: Literary critic; biographer
- Known for: Biography of Henry James
- Awards: Pulitzer Prize for Biography; National Book Award for Nonfiction

Academic background
- Education: McGill University; University of Paris

Joseph Leon Edel (9 September 1907 – 5 September 1997) was an American/Canadian literary critic and biographer. He was the elder brother of North American philosopher Abraham Edel.

The Encyclopædia Britannica calls Edel "the foremost 20th-century authority on the life and works of Henry James." His work on James won him both a National Book Award and a Pulitzer Prize.

== Life and career ==
Cover of volume one of Leon Edel's five-volume biography of Henry James, Avon Books paperback edition 1978

Edel was born on 9 September 1907 in Pittsburgh, Pennsylvania, the son of Fannie (Malamud) and Simon Edel. Edel grew up in Yorkton, Saskatchewan. He attended McGill University and the University of Paris. While at the former he was associated with the Montreal Group of modernist writers, which included F. R. Scott and A. J. M. Smith, and with them founded the influential McGill Fortnightly Review. Edel taught English and American literature at Sir George Williams University (now Concordia University, 1932–1934), New York University (1953–1972), and at the University of Hawaiʻi at Mānoa (1972–1978). For the academic year 1965–1966, he was a fellow on the faculty at the Center for Advanced Studies of Wesleyan University. During WWII, Edel trained at Camp Ritchie and was one of the Ritchie Boys. He discussed his time at the camp in his memoir The Visitable Past. From 1944 to 1952, he worked as a reporter and feature writer for the left-wing New York newspapers PM and The Daily Compass.

Though he wrote on James Joyce (James Joyce: The Last Journey, 1947), Willa Cather (Willa Cather: A Critical Biography, 1953) and the Bloomsbury group, his lifework is summed up in his five-volume biography of Henry James (Henry James: A Biography 1953–1972). Edel discussed the notion of biography in Literary Biography (1957), in particular his conviction that literary biography should enfold a subjective author's self-perceptions into his output. Edel's second and third volumes of the James biography earned him the 1963 Pulitzer Prize for Biography or Autobiography and a National Book Award for Nonfiction in 1963. He also edited many collections of James' fiction, plays, literary criticism and personal letters. Edel enjoyed privileged access to letters and documents from James' life housed in the Widener Library at Harvard University, after gaining the blessing of members of James' family. He referred to other scholars who sought access in vain as 'trespassers'.

The discovery of impassioned but inconclusive letters written in 1875–1876 by James to the Russian aristocrat Paul Zhukovski, while Edel was deep in the process of finishing his biography caused an ethical crisis; his decision was to continue to ignore what he considered a peripheral aspect of the self-identified "celibate" and sexually diffident James's life. Edel did treat James's relationships with novelist Constance Fenimore Woolson and sculptor Hendrik Christian Andersen at length, especially in volumes three and four of the biography. After weighing all the evidence, Edel confessed that he was unable to decide whether James experienced a consummated sexual relationship. Although later scholarship and new materials have called into question the accuracy of his portrait of James, Edel's work remains an important source for studies of the author.

In October 1996, about a year before Edel died, Sheldon M. Novick published Henry James: The Young Master (in 2007 Novick also published Henry James: The Mature Master). Novick's volume "caused something of an uproar in Jamesian circles" as, like other more recent biographies of Walt Whitman and John Singer Sargent, it challenged the notion, deriving from a once-familiar paradigm in biographies of homosexuals when direct evidence was non-existent, that James lived a celibate life. Novick also criticized Edel for following a discounted Freudian interpretation of homosexuality "as a kind of failure." The difference of views led to a series of exchanges between Edel and Novick that were published by Slate.

Edel also edited the notebooks and diaries of literary critic Edmund Wilson. His edition (1975–93) appeared in five volumes covering the decades from the 1920s to the 1960s. He died on 5 September 1997.

== Personal life ==
Edel was married three times. He married his first wife Bertha Cohen in 1935. The marriage ended in divorce in 1950. He then married Roberta Roberts and in 1979 that marriage also ended in divorce. His third marriage, to Marjorie Sinclair, lasted until his death in 1997.

== Selected bibliography ==
- James Joyce: The Last Journey (1947)
- Willa Cather: A Critical Biography (1953) (with Edward Brown)
- Henry James: The Untried Years 1843–1870 (1953) (vol. 1)
- Henry James: Selected Fiction (Everyman's Library [New American Edition], no. 649A, 1953)
- The Psychological Novel, 1900-1950 (1955)
- The Selected Letters of Henry James (1955) (editor)
- Henry James: Parisian Sketches (1957) (editor with Ilse Dusoir Lind)
- Literary Biography (1957)
- The Complete Tales of Henry James (1961–64) (editor)
- Henry James: The Conquest of London 1870–1881 (1962) (vol. 2) ISBN 0-380-39651-3
- Henry James: The Middle Years 1882–1895 (1962) (vol. 3) ISBN 0-380-39669-6
- Henry James: Twentieth Century Views (1963) (editor)
- Henry James: The Treacherous Years 1895–1901 (1969) (vol. 4) ISBN 0-380-39677-7
- Henry James: Stories of the Supernatural (1970) (editor) ISBN 0-8008-3829-7
- Henry James: The Master 1901–1916 (1972) (vol. 5) ISBN 0-380-39677-7
- Henry James Letters (1843-1875) (1974) (editor) (vol. 1) ISBN 0-674-38780-5
- Henry James Letters (1875-1883) (1975) (editor) (vol. 2) ISBN 0-674-38781-3
- Edmund Wilson: The Twenties (1975) (editor) ISBN 0-374-27963-2
- Bloomsbury: A House of Lions (1979) ISBN 0-140-58024-7
- Henry James Letters (1883-1895) (1980) (editor) (vol. 3) ISBN 0-674-38782-1
- Edmund Wilson: The Thirties (1980) (editor) ISBN 0-374-27572-6
- A Bibliography of Henry James: Third Edition (1982) (with Dan Laurence and James Rambeau) ISBN 1-58456-005-3
- Henry James Letters (1895-1916) (1984) (editor) (vol. 4) ISBN 0-674-38783-X
- Henry James Literary Criticism – Essays on Literature, American Writers, English Writers (1984) (editor with Mark Wilson) ISBN 0-940450-22-4
- Henry James Literary Criticism – French Writers, Other European Writers, The Prefaces to the New York Edition (1984) (editor with Mark Wilson) ISBN 0-940450-23-2
- Writing Lives: Principia Biographica (1984) ISBN 0-393-01882-2
- Edmund Wilson: The Forties (1984) (editor) ISBN 0-374-51835-1
- Henry James: Selected Letters (1987) (editor) ISBN 0-674-38793-7
- The Complete Notebooks of Henry James (1987) (editor with Lyall H. Powers) ISBN 978-0-19503782-1
- Edmund Wilson: The Fifties (1987) (editor) ISBN 0-374-52066-6
- The Complete Plays of Henry James (1990) (editor) ISBN 0-19-504379-0
- Edmund Wilson: The Sixties (1993) (editor) ISBN 0-374-26554-2
- The Visitable Past: A Wartime Memoir (2000) ISBN 0-8248-2431-8
