= Henry James bibliography =

This is a list of the works of Henry James (15 April 1843 – 28 February 1916), an American writer who spent the bulk of his career in Britain.

== Series ==
1. Roderick Hudson (1875)
2. The Princess Casamassima (1886)
3. The Ambassadors (1903)
4. "The Velvet Glove" (1909)

== Novels ==
1. Watch and Ward (1871)
2. The American (1877)
3. The Europeans (1878)
4. Confidence (1879)
5. Washington Square (1880)
6. The Portrait of a Lady (1881)
7. The Bostonians (1886)
8. The Reverberator (1888)
9. The Tragic Muse (1890)
10. The Other House (1896)
11. The Spoils of Poynton (1897)
12. What Maisie Knew (1897)
13. The Awkward Age (1899)
14. The Sacred Fount (1901)
15. The Wings of the Dove (1902)
16. The Golden Bowl (1904)
17. The Whole Family (collaborative novel with eleven other authors, 1908)
18. The Outcry (1911)
19. The Ivory Tower (unfinished, published posthumously 1917)
20. The Sense of the Past (unfinished, published posthumously 1917)

== Novellas ==
1. A Passionate Pilgrim (1871)
2. Madame de Mauves (1874)
3. Daisy Miller (1878)
4. "An International Episode" (1878)
5. "The Pension Beaurepas" (1879)
6. "The Point of View" (1882)
7. "The Siege of London" (1883)
8. "Lady Barberina" (1884)
9. "The Author of Beltraffio" (1884)
10. The Aspern Papers (1888)
11. A London Life (1888)
12. The Lesson of the Master (1888)
13. "The Pupil" (1891)
14. "The Coxon Fund" (1894)
15. The Turn of the Screw (1898)
16. "Covering End" (1898)
17. In the Cage (1898)
18. "The Birthplace" (1903)
19. The Beast in the Jungle (1903)
20. "The Papers" (1903)
21. "The Jolly Corner" (1908)
22. "The Bench of Desolation" (1909)

== Novelettes ==
1. "The Madonna of the Future" (1873)
2. "The Last of the Valerii" (1874)
3. "Four Meetings" (1877)
4. "A Bundle of Letters" (1879)
5. "Impressions of a Cousin" (1883)
6. Georgina's Reasons (1884)
7. "Pandora" (1884)
8. "A New England Winter" (1884)
9. "The Marriages" (1891)
10. "The Chaperon" (1891)
11. "The Real Thing" (1892)
12. "The Private Life" (1892)
13. "Owen Wingrave" (1892)
14. "The Middle Years" (1893)
15. "The Death of the Lion" (1894)
16. "The Next Time" (1895)
17. "The Altar of the Dead" (1895)
18. "The Figure in the Carpet" (1896)
19. "The Way It Came" (1896, also published as "The Friends of the Friends")
20. "Glasses" (1896)
21. "The Given Case" (1898)
22. "The Special Type" (1900)
23. "Maud-Evelyn" (1900)
24. "The Tree of Knowledge" (1900)
25. "The Abasement of the Northmores" (1900)
26. "The Tone of Time" (1900)
27. "Julia Bride" (1908)

== Short stories ==
- "A Tragedy of Error" (1864)
- "The Story of a Year" (1865)
- "A Landscape Painter" (1866)
- "A Day of Days" (1866)
- "My Friend Bingham" (1867)
- "Poor Richard" (1867)
- "The Story of a Masterpiece" (1868)
- "A Most Extraordinary Case" (1868)
- "A Problem" (1868)
- "De Grey: A Romance" (1868)
- "Osborne's Revenge" (1868)
- "The Romance of Certain Old Clothes" (1868)
- "A Light Man" (1869)
- "Gabrielle de Bergerac" (1869)
- "Travelling Companions" (1870)
- "At Isella" (1871)
- "Master Eustace" (1871)
- "Guest's Confession" (1872)
- "The Sweetheart of M. Briseux" (1873)
- "Adina" (1874)
- "Professor Fargo" (1874)
- "Eugene Pickering" (1874)
- "Benvolio" (1875)
- "Crawford's Consistency" (1876)
- "The Ghostly Rental" (1876)
- "Rose-Agathe" (1878, as "Théodolinde")
- "Longstaff's Marriage" (1878)
- "A Diary of a Man of Fifty" (1879)
- "The Path of Duty" (1884)
- "Mrs. Temperly" (1887)
- "Louisa Pallant" (1888)
- "The Liar" (1888)
- "The Modern Warning" (1888, originally published as "The Two Countries")
- "The Patagonia" (1888)
- "The Solution" (1888)
- "Brooksmith" (1891)
- "Sir Edmund Orme" (1891)
- "Nona Vincent" (1892)
- "Lord Beaupré" (1892)
- "The Visits" (1892)
- "Sir Dominick Ferrand" (1892)
- "Greville Fane" (1892)
- "Collaboration" (1892)
- "The Wheel of Time" (1892)
- "John Delavoy" (1898)
- "Europe" (1899)
- "The Great Condition" (1899)
- "The Real Right Thing" (1899)
- "Paste" (1899)
- "The Great Good Place" (1900)
- "Miss Gunton of Poughkeepsie" (1900)
- "The Third Person" (1900)
- "Broken Wings" (1900)
- "The Two Faces" (1900)
- "Mrs. Medwin" (1901)
- "The Beldonald Holbein" (1901)
- "The Story in It" (1902)
- "Flickerbridge" (1902)
- "Fordham Castle" (1904)
- "Mora Montravers" (1909)
- "Crapy Cornelia" (1909)
- "A Round of Visits" (1910)

== Story collections ==
- Terminations (1893)
- The Soft Side (1900)
- The Better Sort (1903)
- New York Edition (1907–1909), "definitive" edition of James's fiction, selected and revised by James.
- Travelling Companions (1919)

== Travel writings ==
- Transatlantic Sketches (1875)
- Portraits of Places (1883)
- A Little Tour in France (1884)
- English Hours (1905)
- The American Scene (1907)
- Italian Hours (1909)
- Within the Rim (1918)

== Plays ==
- Pyramus and Thisbe (1869)
- Still Waters (1871)
- A Change of Heart (1872)
  - Tenants (1890)
  - Disengaged (1892)
- Theatricals (1894)
- Theatricals: Second Series (1895)
  - The Album (1891)
  - The Reprobate (1891)
- Guy Domville (1895)
- The High Bid (1907)
- The Saloon (1908)
- The Other House (1908)
- Monologue Written for Ruth Draper (1913)

=== Prose Fiction-Related Plays ===
1. Daisy Miller (1882)
2. The American (1890)
3. Summersoft (1895)
4. The Outcry (1909)

== Non-Fiction ==
=== Essays and criticism ===
- French Poets and Novelists (1878)
- Hawthorne (1879)
- Partial Portraits (1888)
- Essays in London and Elsewhere (1893)
- Picture and Text (1893)
- William Wetmore Story and His Friends (1903)
- The Question of our Speech; The Lesson of Balzac. Two Lectures (1905)
- Views and Reviews (1908)
- Notes on Novelists (1914)
- A Most Unholy Trade (1925, published posthumously)
- The Art of the Novel: Critical Prefaces (1934)

=== Memoirs ===
- A Small Boy and Others (1913)
- Notes of a Son and Brother (1914)
- The Middle Years (unfinished, published posthumously 1917)
- Notebooks (various, published posthumously)
