= English Hours =

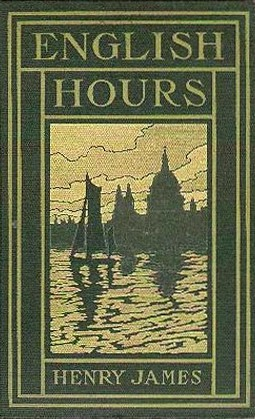
- First US edition
- Author: Henry James
- Language: English
- Genre: Travel writing
- Publisher: William Heinemann, London; Houghton, Mifflin and Company, Boston
- Publication date: Heinemann: 18-Oct-1905; Houghton: 28-Oct-1905
- Publication place: United Kingdom, United States
- Media type: Print
- Pages: Heinemann: 315; Houghton: 330

English Hours is a book of travel writing by Henry James published in 1905. The book collected various essays James had written on England over a period of more than thirty years, beginning in the 1870s. The essays had originally appeared in such periodicals as The Nation, The Century Magazine, Scribner's Magazine, The Galaxy and Lippincott's Magazine. James wrote a new introduction for the book and extensively revised many of the essays to create a more coherent whole.

== Summary and themes ==
England was James' adopted country, so it is not surprising that the essays in English Hours are primarily positive and sometimes downright cheerful. The essay on London which begins the book gives full play to the British capital's definitely non-beautiful impression on James when he arrived in 1869:

"It was not lovely - it was in fact rather horrible; but as I move again through dusky, tortuous miles, in the greasy four-wheeler to which my luggage had compelled me to commit myself, I recognize the first step in an initiation of which the subsequent stages were to abound in pleasant things."

Some of the most pleasant things were James' trips to the English countryside, memorably described in essays such as "North Devon," "In Warwickshire" and "Old Suffolk." James grew particularly affectionate towards his eventual hometown of Rye, East Sussex and its surrounding area, as he recounts in "Winchelsea, Rye and 'Denis Duval'."

But James never loses his love for the metropolis on the Thames, as "he reflects with elation that the British capital is the particular spot in the world which communicates the greatest sense of life." He writes with unfailing enthusiasm of "the dreadful, delightful city" he would come to know so well.

=== Table of contents ===
London; Browning in Westminster Abbey; Chester; Lichfield and Warwick; North Devon; Wells and Salisbury	An English Easter; London at Midsummer; Two Excursions; In Warwickshire; Abbeys and Castles	English Vignettes; An English New Year; An English Winter Watering-place; Winchelsea, Rye and Denis Duval; Old Suffolk

== Critical evaluation ==
The essays in English Hours were written over a span of some three decades, and differences in style are evident despite James' attempt to revise the book into more of a uniform entity. So the book cannot claim the intensity and unity of The American Scene, or even the more relaxed wholeness of A Little Tour in France.

But this poses no real problem for the reader, because James' attitudes toward England did not shift much during his long residence in the country. His knowing affection for "this decent and dauntless people," as he would call the English during World War I, plays through all the essays regardless of their dates.
