= Velvet Glove (disambiguation) =

Velvet Glove is a Canadian air-to-air missile system.

Velvet Glove may also refer to:

- Sam Maceo (1894-1951), sometimes known as the "Velvet Glove", an organized crime boss in Galveston, Texas
- Velvet Glove, a 1977 television play by Andrew Davies
- The Velvet Glove, a 1909 story by Henry James
- "The Velvet Glove", a short story by Harry Harrison, included in his 1962 collection War with the Robots
