= The Next Time (novelette) =

- Short story by Henry James
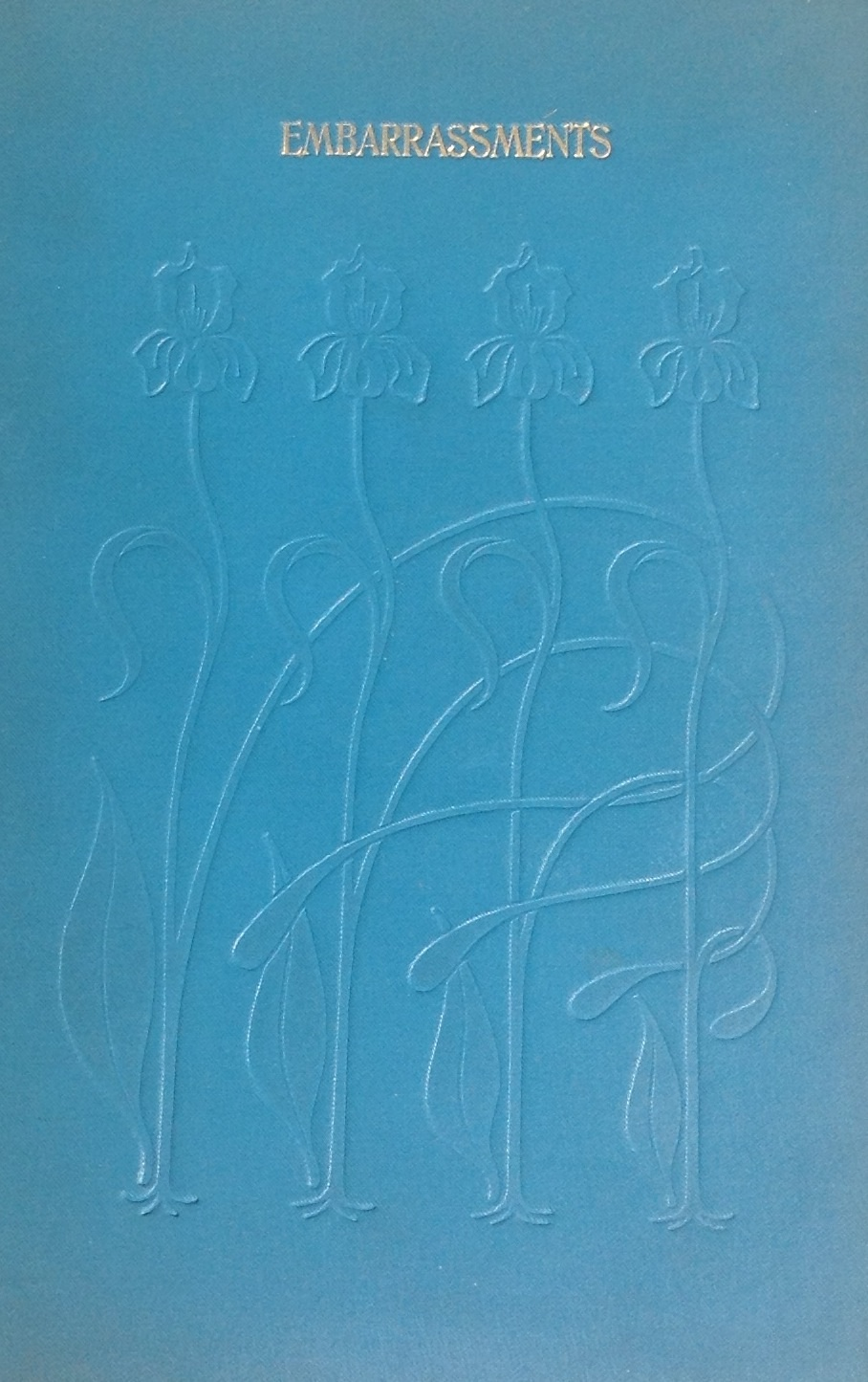
- Embarrassments, 1896, first U.K. hardcover edition of "The Next Time"
- Country: United Kingdom
- Language: English
- Genre: Novelette

Publication
- Published in: The Yellow Book
- Publication type: Periodical
- Publisher: William Heinemann
- Media type: Print (Magazine)
- Publication date: July 1895
- Pages: 48

"The Next Time" is an 1895 novelette by Henry James.

== Plot summary ==
Mrs Highmore, a novelist, asks the narrator, a literary critic, to look through a book by Ralph Limbert which she deems artistic. The author works as a journalist for The Blackport Beacon to support his family. His attempts at writing trashy/journalistic pieces is to not avail, and he gets dismissed from his job for it. He is writing another novel entitled The Major Key - although it is said to be a good book it won't sell much, not enough for him to get married on. He goes on to publish other books without commercial success.

He subsequently takes up work for another newspaper which sets out to let him be more artistic. The narrator comes across a good review on his latest book from an American newspaper. Yet, as Mrs Highmore tells the narrator, Ralph gets dismissed again after having an argument with his editor, Mr. Bousefield, over his elitist writings, the narrator's nagging advice, and satirist Minnie Meadows. The narrator reflects that Limbert is not capable of appealing to the masses.

Ralph then moves to the countryside, poor and humiliated as he is. He writes The Hidden Heart, which again is no success. Unable to afford to spend the winter in Egypt as he should on doctor's order, he writes another novel, Derogation, instead, and passes away before getting it published.

== Characters ==
- The narrator
- Mrs. Highmore, a novelist
- Mr. Cecil Highmore, Mrs Highmore's husband
- Ralph Limbert, a writer
- Maud Limbert, Ralph's wife
- Mrs. Stannace, Maud's mother
- Pat Moyle, another writer
- Lady Robeck (briefly mentioned)
- Mr. Bousefield, a magazine editor

== References to other works ==
- William Shakespeare's King Lear is mentioned to describe Mrs Stannace.
- Mrs Limbert mentions William Shakespeare and Walter Scott.

== Publication history ==
"The Next Time" first appeared in The Yellow Book, issue #6, in July 1895.

Its hardcover debut, in a volume titled Embarrassments, came in June 1896 from London publisher William Heinemann and the Macmillan Company in New York. Three other stories appear in the book: "The Figure in the Carpet", "Glasses", and "The Way It Came".
