= Theatricals: Second Series =

Play collection by Henry James

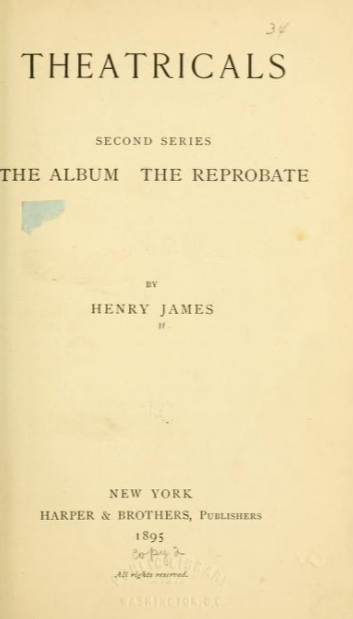
- Author: Henry James
- Language: English
- Genre: Plays
- Publisher: Osgood, McIlvane & Co., London
- Publication date: December 8th, 1894
- Publication place: United Kingdom
- Media type: Print
- Pages: 416

Theatricals: Second Series is a book of two plays by Henry James published in 1895. As a follow-up to his 1894 book Theatricals, James included two more unproduced plays in this volume, The Album and The Reprobate. James wrote a longer preface for this book, where he discussed writing for the theater and the sacrifices involved.

== Plot summaries ==
The Album opens at the country house of Courtland outside London, where the owner Bedford is dying upstairs and the fate of his estate is unclear. Sir Ralph Damant, the nearest heir, believes he has full claim to the estate. Artist Mark Bernal, a distant relative thought to be long dead, also claims he is entitled to the estate, and presents an album of sketches dated "September, '91", leaving the true heir uncertain. There are also three women closely involved with the dispute: Lady Basset, Bedford's friend who now wants Sir Ralph so she can get the Bedford estate; Maud Vincent, beloved by Teddy Ashdown but wanting more; and Grace Jesmond, Bedford's put-upon secretary who falls for Mark.

Eventually, Mark and Grace decide to get married, as do Teddy and Maud. Sir Ralph wants to get rid of the fortune-hunting Lady Basset, and ultimately gives the Bedford inheritance to Mark.

The Reprobate, a play which James described as better than The Album, opens with an unannounced stranger, Mrs. Freshville, appearing at Mr. Bonsor's Hampton Court villa. It is then revealed that she is Nina, Paul Doubleday's lady friend, who spent time with him in Paris many years ago. For the past decade Paul has been kept under close control in the villa, well away from life's temptations, by his widowed stepmother Mrs. Doubleday and his co-guardian, the bachelor Bonsor.

Blanche Amber, Bonsor's niece, meets Paul and dislikes how he is being treated almost as a child because others suspect him of a dissolute and unreliable nature. Meanwhile, Captain Chanter is pursuing Mrs. Doubleday. Eventually, Blanche accepts Paul's marriage proposal, which gets him out of his isolation. The "reprobate" Paul turns out to be mature and responsible.
