= Glasses (short story) =

1896 short story by Henry James

- Short story by Henry James
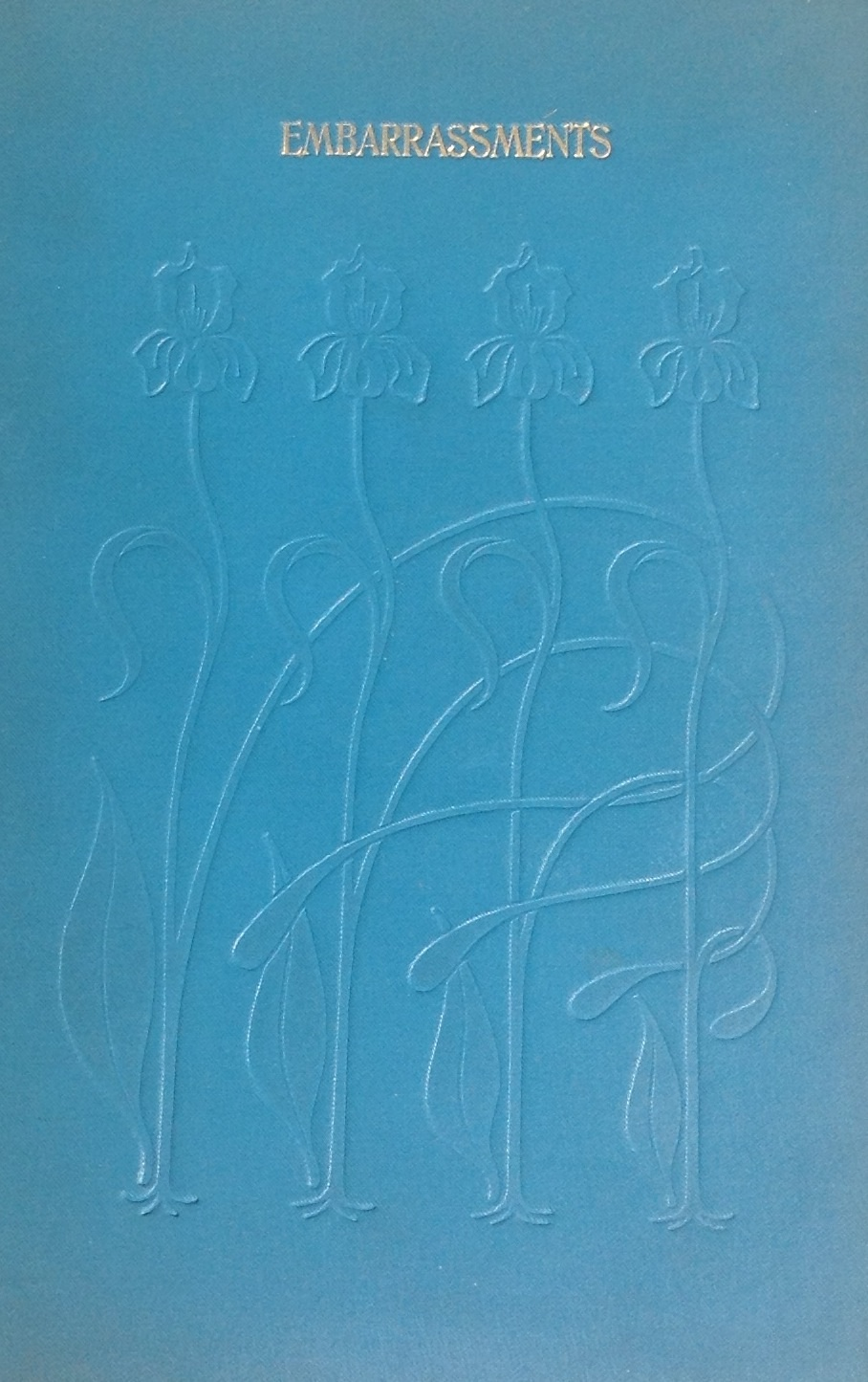
- Embarrassments, 1896, first U.K. hardcover edition of "Glasses"
- Country: United Kingdom
- Language: English
- Genre: Short story

Publication
- Published in: Atlantic Monthly
- Publication type: Periodical
- Publisher: William Heinemann
- Media type: Print (Magazine)
- Publication date: February 1896
- Pages: 55

"Glasses" is an 1896 short story by Henry James. A young woman whose only asset is a supremely beautiful face is about to make a society marriage. That is, until her fiancé discovers that, being virtually blind, she needs thick glasses which ruin her looks.

== Plot summary ==
The anonymous narrator, a bachelor artist, visits Folkestone and sees a young woman with an astonishly beautiful face. From a friend, the widowed Mrs Meldrum who has to wear disfiguring glasses, he learns that she is Flora Saunt, an orphan. She has an admirer in Lord Iffield, heir to a country estate but not very bright. Another admirer, also well off, is Geoffrey Dawling, who is intelligent and sympathetic but not good looking.

Flora agrees to sit for a portrait by the narrator, who discovers that, having little money or brains, her only goal in life is to acquire a husband. After she succeeds in getting engaged to Iffield, the narrator sees the two in a London shop where, to inspect an item, she surreptitiously uses a pince-nez. Momentarily, the beauty of her face is ruined. Revisiting Folkestone later, in the distance he sees a woman in corrective glasses who he takes to be Mrs Meldrum. In fact, to the embarrassment of both, it is Flora. Dropped by Iffield when he realised her sight was failing, she has been given a home by the kindly Mrs Meldrum.

Some time later in London, the narrator attends a performance of Lohengrin. In a box, he sees a beautiful woman wearing expensive jewels who he thinks must be Flora. She points her opera glasses at him and smiles. Going up to her box and kissing her hand in greeting, he realises she is now blind. Geoffrey, her loving husband whose lack of looks she cannot see, rejoins the two.

== Characters ==
- Miss Flora Saunt, a young woman of uncommon beauty and excessive vanity, orphaned
- Mrs. Meldrum, a woman who wears thick eyeglasses
- Mr. Geoffrey Dawling, an undistinguished Oxford intellectual who is not good-looking and who is in love with Flora
- Lord Iffield, soon to be Lord Considine, briefly engaged to Flora
- Narrator, an artist

== Publication history ==
"Glasses" first appeared in the Atlantic Monthly in February 1896.

Its hardcover debut, in a volume titled Embarrassments, came in June 1896 from London publisher William Heinemann and the Macmillan Company in New York. Three other stories appear in the book: "The Figure in the Carpet", "The Next Time", and "The Way It Came".

"Glasses" was the only story in Embarrassments excluded from the New York Edition of 1909.

== Misc ==
- Complete Stories 1892–1898 from Library of America
- Terence Feely's 1974 TV series for ITV (London), Affairs of the Heart included a dramatisation of "Glasses", under title of "Flora". The leading woman was played by Gayle Hunnicutt (beautiful in face, but with large teeth that belie her claim to total beauty). The older, wiser woman with thick spectacles and a heart of gold, was played by Patricia Routledge (later famous for her role as Hyacinth Bucket in the popular comedy series Keeping Up Appearances). The "surgical glasses" shown in the dramatisation are extremely thick, and marked by a "bar" across the centre. They are referred to as "goggles". The aristocrat was played as a Monty Python upper-class twit, with clipped words, and a terrible pronunciation. The gentle eventual-husband was played as having a strong stammer, but a heart, also, of gold, able, when relaxed, to speak freely. At the very end, in the opera-box, when the full, sad consequences are grasped - she is as beautiful as ever, and utterly blind—the husband remarks that the blindness "is irrelevant".
