= The Allies' Fairy Book =

Illustrated compilation of fairy tales (1916)

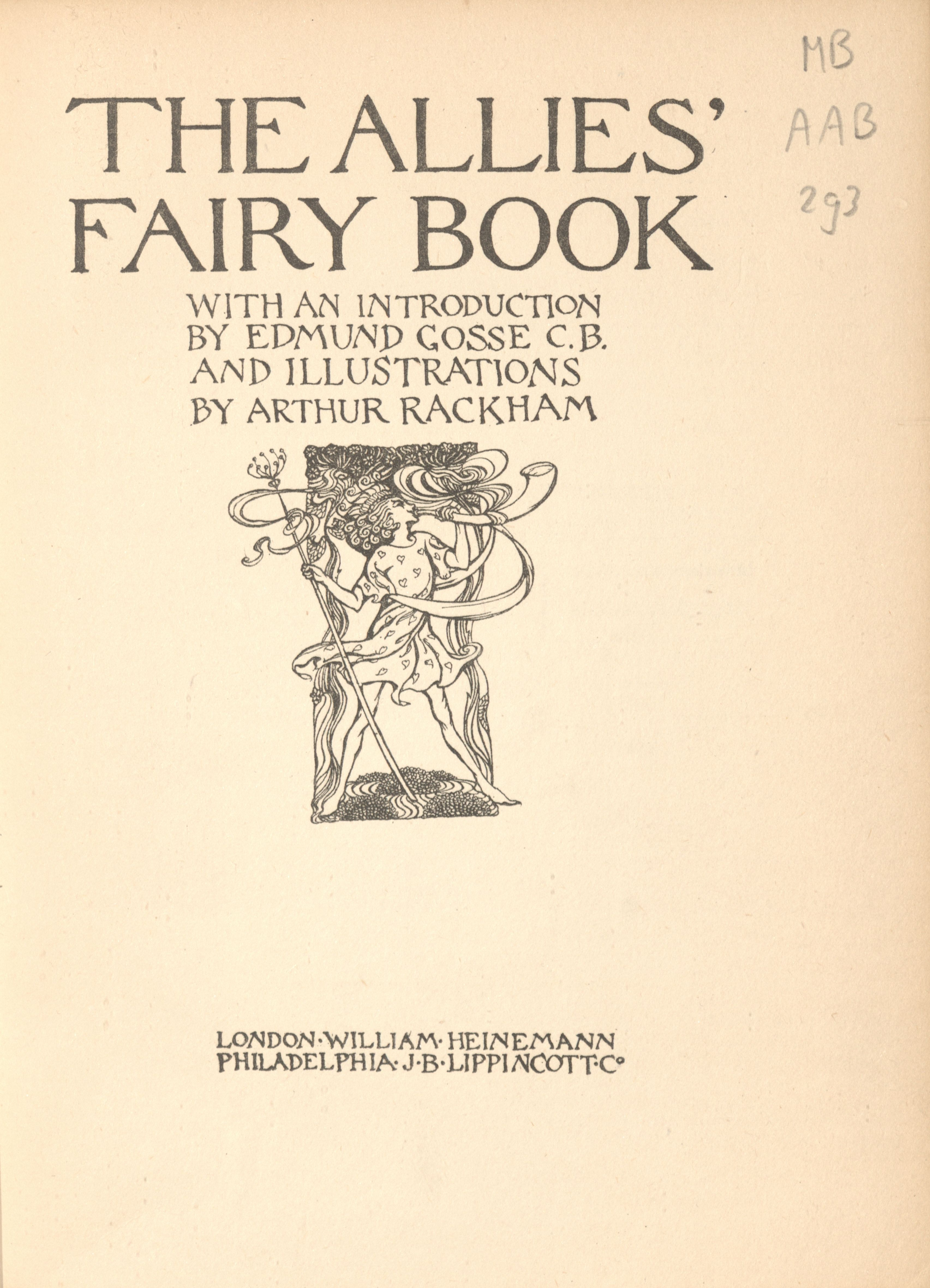
Title page

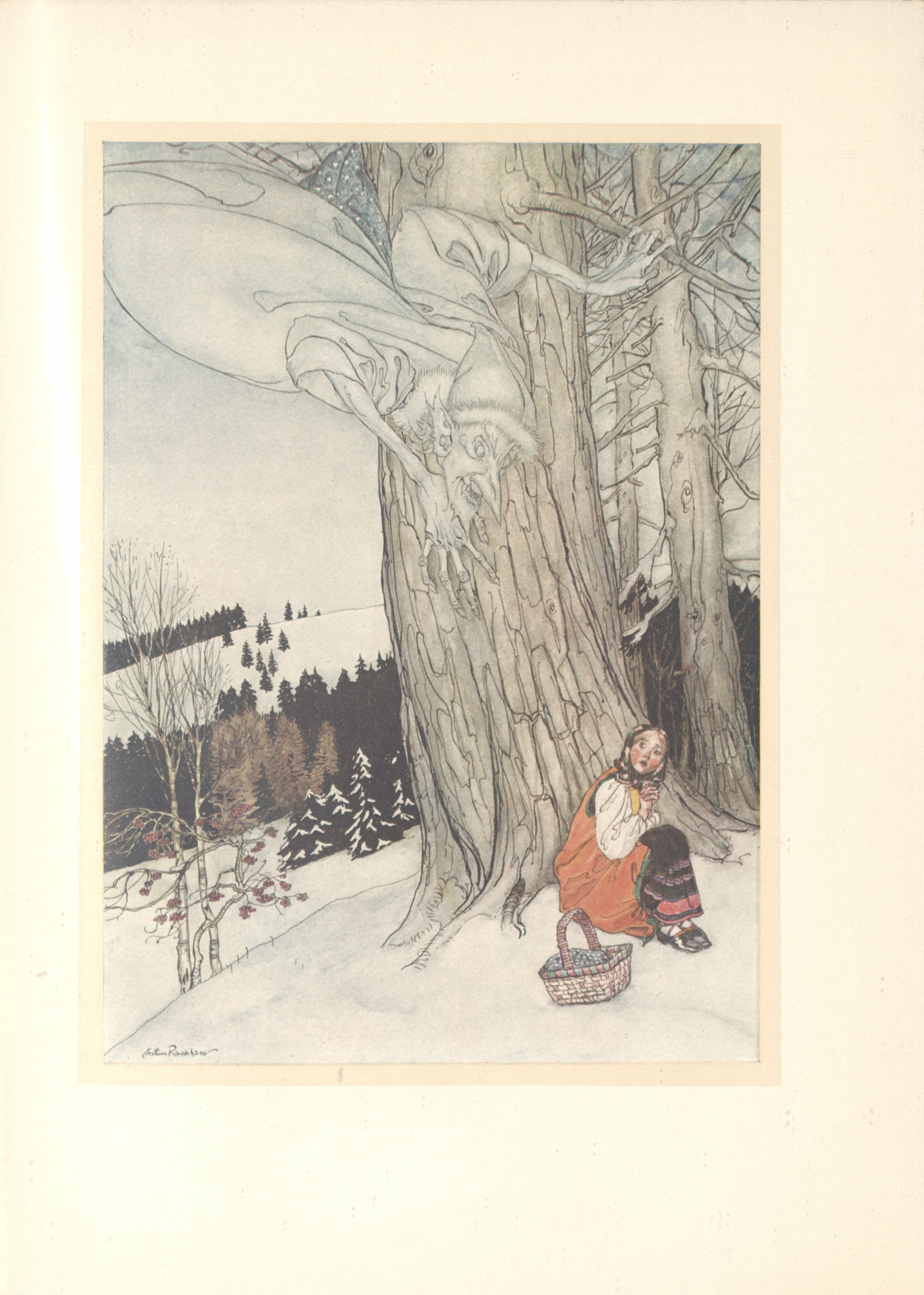
Page from the book

The Allies' Fairy Book is a compilation of fairy tales published by William Heinemann and J.B. Lippincott in 1916. Illustrated by Arthur Rackham, the volume includes an introduction by Edmund Gosse. The children's book contains a selection of thirteen tales from eight allied nations in the First World War. France, Italy, Portugal, Russia, Serbia, and Belgium are all represented by one tale each, as are the four countries of the United Kingdom (England, Scotland, Wales, and Ireland), while Japan has three shorter fairy tales. Some allied forces are not represented as they joined after the time of publication. The book also contains 11 full-page color illustrations as well as smaller monotone illustrations created by Arthur Rackham.

== Context ==
Folklore in the form of fairytales likely goes back to humanities earliest oral stories. Originally intended for adults and children alike, they contained entertaining stories with hidden moral messages. From the moment they were put in writing, they became a literary genre mainly stemming from passed down oral stories in European cultures. Historically fairy tales have been used in different forms of protest and propaganda. In the mid-17th century tales arose in Parisian salons frequented by aristocratic women. In a time where women were prohibited from having formal education, women in the salons would discuss matters such as love and intellectual compatibility between men and women, opposing the system of arranged marriages. The tales that arose commented on the conditions of aristocratic life while the decorative language disguised the rebellious subtext. These salon tales have been preserved in the collection titled Le Cabinet des Fées.

The most notable translations from oral stories to literature where by Charles Perrault and the Grimm Brothers. Perrault's Tales of Mother Goose (1697) included works such as "Cinderella," "Little Red Ridinghood," and "Sleeping Beauty" and the Grimm's Fairy Tales (1812-15) wanted to preserve oral traditions by compiling oral renderings of famous German fairy tales. While the original stories were full of torture, murder, and rape, they are commonly adopted into nursery tales people of the west. They teach children how to deal with certain social situations, helps them find their place in society, and teaches them important moral lessons. During the late 1800 and early 1900 fairy tale popularity peaked with children having a wide variety of fairy tales written and published for them.

Although the production of fairy books decreased with the World War I as resources were rationed and directed towards the war efforts, fairy tales remained popular. The fairy books were published included fairy tales that were reimagined with warlike undertones. These books included the Navy Book of Fairy Tales (1916), Edmund Dulac's Fairy Book: Fairy Tales of the Allied Nations (1916), and The Allies' Fairy Book (1916). The fairy tales in these books were not originally written as war propaganda but they were brought back to serve new political purposes. The introduction by Gosse states "It is when the hearts of country folk are hushed and silent that the mysterious voices of goblins are heard calling...". Themes in these fairy tales include duty and patriotism and were selected to match wartime ideologies. By representing fairy tales from all allied forces, the book suggested commonality and unity among all allied forces.

Before the publication of The Allies' Fairy Book, Heinemann collaborated with Gosse on many of his other famous publications, including, Gossip in a Library (1891), French Profiles (1905), The Collected Poems of Edmund Gosse (1911). During Asquith's reign as Prime Minister from 1908–1916 Gosse was at the height of his influence in England. He was one of Asquith's most trusted advisors as well as part of the Anglo-French Society, the Royal Literary Fund and the Royal Society of Literature. As he had many established links with European writers, Gosse also acted as literary ambassador between France and England during the war. It was during this height of influence in 1916 that Gosse published a collection of Fairy Tales from different allied forces together with Heinemann and Lippencott. The Allies' Fairy Book also contained an introduction from Gosse and illustrations by Rackham.

Rackham is well-known as one of the leading book illustrators in the golden age of illustration before the start of the First World War He gained success with his illustrations of The Fairy Tales of the Brothers Grimm and Peter Pan in Kensington Gardens. Due to the high-quality illustrations available during the 1890s, his books became popular expensive illustrated gift books. This golden age of illustration was starting to come to an end at the start of World War I in 1914 as a result of the shift from gift books to aiding the war efforts. To raise funds many illustrators like Rackham started publishing their work in war related books such as The Allies' Fairy Book.

== Contents and sources ==
The book has 136 pages and 12 unnumbered full page illustrations. It starts with an introduction from literary critic Edmund Gosse. Here he introduces the concept of fairy tales and their importance. Gosse proceeds to introduce the individual fairy tales compiled in the book. The tales are presented per country in the following order:

Jack the Giant-killer (English, from English Fairy Tales by Joseph Jacobs)

The Battle of the Birds (Scotch, from Popular Tales of the West Highlands by John Francis Campbell)

Lludd and Llevelys (Welsh, from The Mabinogion by Lady Charlotte Guest)

Guleesh (Irish, from Beside the Fire by Douglas Hyde)

The Sleeping Beauty (French, from Tales of Mother Goose by Charles Perrault; translated by Samuel Robinson Littlewood)

Cesarino and the Dragon (Italian, from The Facetious Nights by Giovanni Francesco Straparola; translated by William George Waters)

What Came of Picking Flowers (Portuguese, from The Grey Fairy Book by Andrew Lang)

The Adventures of Little Peachling, The Fox's Wedding and The Tongue-cut Sparrow (Japanese, from Tales of Old Japan by Lord Redesdale)

Frost (Russian, from Russian Folk-Tales by William Ralston Shedden-Ralston)

The Golden Apple-Tree and the Nine Peahens (Serbian, from Serbian Folk-Lore by Madame Mijatovic)

The Last Adventure of Thyl Ulenspiegel (Belgian, from the novel The Legend of Thyl Ulenspiegel and Lamme Goedzak by Charles De Coster).

Every story has a full page colour illustration by Arthur Rackham as well as some smaller monochrome images.

== Reception ==
The Allies' Fairy Book was published both in America by J.P Lippencott and in Great Britain by Heinemann in an attempt to increase printing numbers by increasing the area of distribution. Rackham's association with the book was important, as his illustrations were a big selling point. As with other works, Rackham created a deluxe edition with 525 copies that was signed by Rackham and sold to collectors for a much higher price. The book was also advertised in historical advertisements under "This year's Rackham", which highlighted his influence and drawings were a main selling point. After the war, the demand in gift books declined and his popularity shifted from Great Britain to America. Unlike other illustrators, Rackham's fame still provided him a lot of work. He went on to illustrate Cinderella (1919) and The Sleeping beauty (1920) in a silhouettes style and he finished his last illustration of The Wind in the Willows by Kenneth Grahame (1940) three weeks before he died. Gosse also remained popular after the First World War ended in 1918. He received his own forum in the Sunday Times and was knighted in 1925.

During the war the production of Fairy books decreased as resources were limited. This continued through the Great Depression and the demand in Fairy books decreased. However, in 1937, fairy tales began to regain popularity with the introduction of movies by Walt Disney. Recognising the need for escapism in post war times, Disney took classic fairy tales and turned them in to popular motion pictures, shaping fairy tales in the 20th century. They choose fairy tales as they appealed to both adults and children and edited them to fit "the interest of commerce" with the themes of 'happily ever after" becoming a fairy tale norm. During the post World War II period the book industry surged again with paper back version of fairy tales being widely available. During this time they were mass produced and became famous for being educational and entertaining for children.
