= Brooksmith =

- Short story by Henry James
- Country: United Kingdom
- Language: English
- Genre: Short story

Publication
- Published in: The Lesson of the Master
- Publication type: Book

"Brooksmith" is a short story written by Henry James in 1891.

== Plot ==
The narrator tells the story of Brooksmith, a butler he had once known. Brooksmith was responsible for the preservation of the atmosphere in a retired diplomat's salon where the guests enjoyed a high level of intellectual conversation with the diplomat and each other. Brooksmith was regarded by the narrator as "the artist" who insured that the company at each gathering was the optimum number and mix of personalities to provide the highest level of conversation possible. This was partially of benefit to Brooksmith himself, who would linger in the room on some pretext or other in order to eavesdrop on the exchanges. The diplomat was well aware of this, and alluded to it on occasion with dryly humorous remarks. With the diplomat's death, Brooksmith loses his vocation, which to him was almost a calling. Brooksmith, lonely and dispirited, works a few odd jobs but falls into poverty and illness. At the end of the story, the narrator reveals that Brooksmith had disappeared, and implies that he may have committed suicide.
