= The Figure in the Carpet =

1896 short story by Henry James

- Short story by Henry James
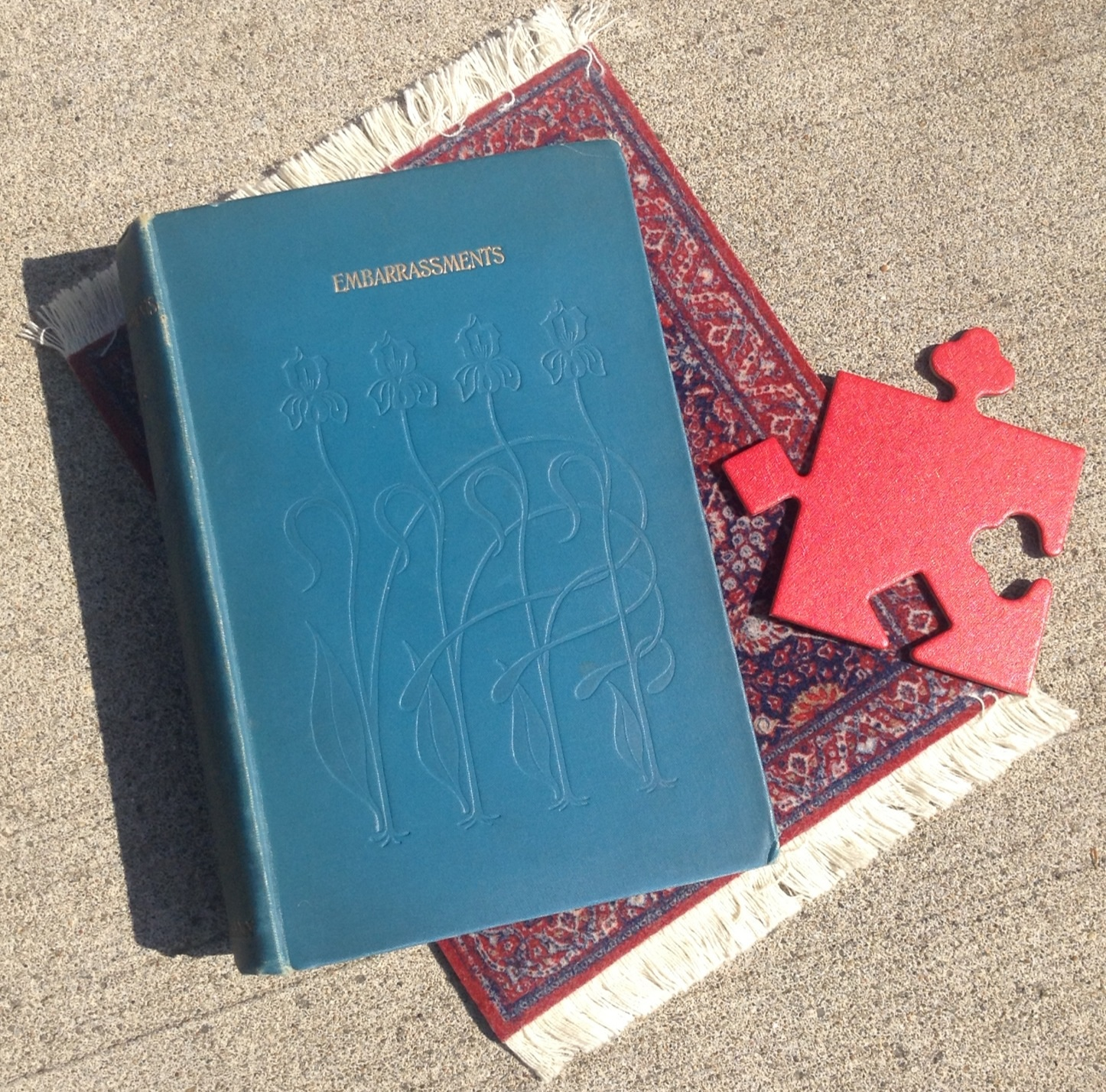
- Embarrassments, 1896, first edition of "The Figure in the Carpet"
- Country: United Kingdom
- Language: English
- Genre: Short story

Publication
- Published in: Cosmopolis
- Publication type: Periodical
- Media type: Print (Magazine)
- Publication date: 1896
- Pages: 64

"The Figure in the Carpet" is a short story (sometimes considered a novella) by American writer Henry James first published in 1896. It is told in the first person; the narrator, whose name is never revealed, meets his favorite author and becomes obsessed with discovering the secret meaning or intention of all the author's works.

"The Figure in the Carpet" has evaded definitive interpretation. In his book Henry James (1913), Ford Madox Ford wrote that after it was published, James's contemporaries set themselves on a quest for the Figure as an identifiable physical entity. In the preface to his A Choice of Kipling's Verse (1941), T. S. Eliot wrote, "Nowadays, we all look for the Figure in the Carpet." It is possible that James's Figure is a palpable object that, like a talisman, facilitates interpretation of his own work.

== Plot ==
The narrator, a writer for a literary newspaper, prides himself on his astute review of Hugh Vereker's latest novel. Vereker inadvertently dismisses his efforts, and then to repair his incivility, confides in the narrator that all critics have "missed my little point," "the particular thing I've written my books most for," "the thing for the critic to find," "my secret," "like a complex figure in a Persian carpet." The narrator racks his brains and, in desperation, tells his friend Corvick about the puzzle. Corvick and his novelist fiancée, Gwendolen, pursue "the trick" without success until Corvick, traveling alone in India, wires Gwendolen and the narrator "Eureka! Immense." Corvick refuses to tell Gwendolen the secret until they are married, and then dies in an accident. Since Gwendolen refuses to share her knowledge, the narrator speculates, "the figure in the carpet [was] traceable or describable only for husbands and wives—for lovers supremely united." She remarries, and after her death, the narrator approaches her new husband to discover the secret. But the widowed husband is surprised and humiliated by the news of his late wife's great "secret," and he and the narrator conclude by sharing the same curiosity.

== Publication history ==
"The Figure in the Carpet" first appeared in the periodical Cosmopolis in January/February 1896.

In hardcover, it was first published in June 1896 in a volume titled Embarrassments, simultaneously issued by London publisher William Heinemann (1250 copies) and the Macmillan Company in New York (1600 copies). Three other stories appear in the book: "Glasses", "The Next Time", and "The Way It Came".
