= The Coxon Fund =

1894 short story by Henry James

- Short story by Henry James
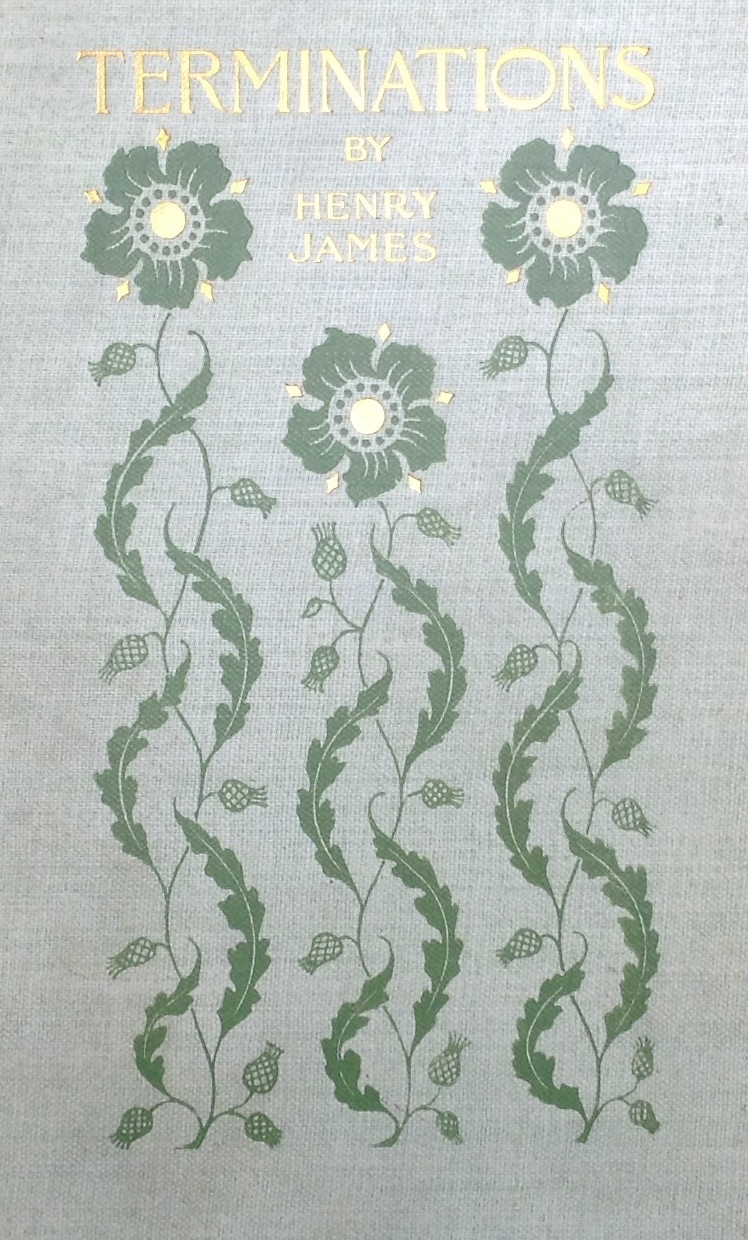
- Terminations, 1895, first U.S. edition of "The Coxon Fund"
- Country: United Kingdom; United States
- Language: English
- Genre: Short story

Publication
- Published in: The Yellow Book
- Publication type: Periodical
- Publisher: William Heinemann, London; Harper & Brothers Publishers, New York City
- Media type: Print (Magazine)
- Publication date: 1894
- Pages: 55

"The Coxon Fund" is an 1894 short story by Henry James.

== Plot summary ==
Frank Saltram is a man who apparently has a towering intellect, but one that manifests itself only in sparkling table-talk. He has a real and powerful gift to delight with his conversation, particularly when intoxicated, but other than conversation he produces nothing. Saltram also recognises no obligations or duties, is ungrateful and utterly unreliable, and is apparently prone to immoral acts. He lives off others, particularly the Mulvilles, who, convinced of Saltram's genius and genuinely enjoying his talk, host him for months at a time. In the opinion of the unnamed narrator, Saltram is not a deliberate conman; he simply suffers from "a want of dignity".

The story revolves around Saltram and a group of people who are fascinated by him. Ruth Anvoy, a young American woman with a wealthy father, comes to Britain to visit her widowed aunt Lady Coxon. There she meets George Gravener, a man with a real intellect and a future in politics, and the two become engaged. She also meets Saltram, and is fascinated and impressed by his talk and intellect, though aware that he has shortcomings of character.

Having made a promise to her now-deceased husband, Lady Coxon has for years been seeking to bestow a sum of 13,000 pounds upon a talented intellectual whose potential has been hampered by lack of money. Having failed to find such a person, Lady Coxon tells Anvoy that upon her death the money will be left to her, and she must carry on the quest.

Anvoy's father suffers heavy financial losses and loses most of what he has. He dies, and shortly afterwards Lady Coxon dies. Anvoy, having lost nearly all her wealth, has only the 13,000 pounds from Lady Coxon, with a moral but not legal obligation to give it away. Gravener urges her to keep the money, as it could be used to buy them a house once they are married. She refuses, and their relationship becomes strained. Later, she entertains the idea of giving the money to Saltram, who Gravener despises as a fraud and "not a gentleman." Eventually their engagement is broken off.

Finally, the unnamed narrator is given a sealed letter and asked to give it to Anvoy. The letter is understood to contain a denunciation of Saltram's most immoral acts. The narrator must decide whether to blight Saltram's prospects by delivering the letter. He is willing to do so if it will save his friend Gravener's engagement with Anvoy, but Gravener is unable to assure him of this.

Eventually he does offer the letter to Anvoy, but Anvoy declines to read it. She awards the Coxon Fund to Saltram, who lives off it exactly as he lived off his friends, producing nothing of intellectual value. Thus the only result of the award is the Mulvilles and others lose the pleasure of Saltram's conversation.

== Characters ==
- Mr Frank Saltram, a debt-ridden writer
- Adelaide and Kent Mulville
- Mr George Gravener
- Mrs Saltram
- Miss Ruth Anvoy, a girl from Boston.
- Lady Coxon, an American widow. She is Miss Anvoy's aunt.
- Sir Gregory Coxon, Lady Coxon's late husband and former mayor of Clockborough.
- The Pudneys
- Lady Maddock

== References to other works ==
- George Gravener is compared to Aristophanes.
- George Sand is referred to as "Madame Sand".
- William Shakespeare's King Lear
- "old man of the sea" classical reference
