= Confidence (novel) =

1879 novel by Henry James

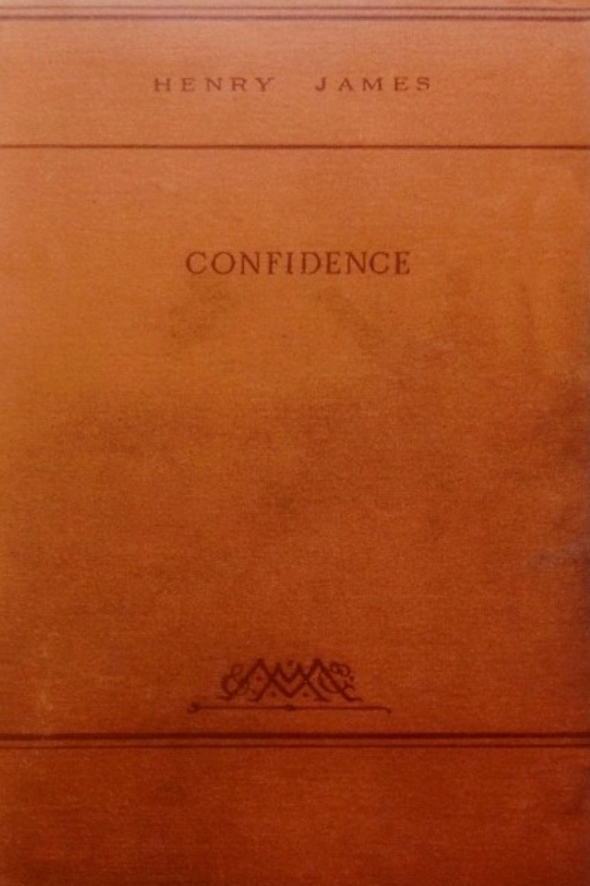
- Author: Henry James
- Language: English
- Publisher: Chatto & Windus, (London); Houghton, Osgood and Company, (Boston)
- Publication date: 10 December 1879 (Chatto & Windus); 7 February 1880 (Houghton)
- Publication place: United Kingdom, United States
- Media type: Print (Serial)
- Pages: Vol. 1: 309 pp, Vol. 2: 253 pp (Chatto & Windus); 347 pp (Houghton)
- Preceded by: The Europeans
- Followed by: Washington Square

Confidence is a novel by Henry James, first published as a serial in Scribner's Monthly in 1879 and then as a book later the same year. This light and somewhat awkward comedy centers on artist Bernard Longueville, scientist Gordon Wright, and the sometimes inscrutable heroine, Angela Vivian. The plot rambles through various romantic entanglements before reaching an uncomplicated, but still believable happy ending.

== Plot summary ==
While sketching in Siena, Bernard Longueville meets Angela Vivian and her mother. Later, Bernard's friend and self-proclaimed "mad" scientist Gordon Wright calls Longueville to Baden-Baden to pass judgment on whether he should marry Angela. Bernard recommends against it, based on his belief that Angela is something of a mysterious coquette.

So Gordon marries the lightweight (in both senses) Blanche Evers. After a couple years Longueville again meets Angela at a French beach resort and realizes he loves her. They get engaged, and Angela tells Bernard that she had refused Gordon when he proposed to her. Eventually Angela manages to reconcile Gordon and Blanche, who were becoming estranged due to a supposed extramarital affair Blanche had. Everybody lives happily ever after.

== Major themes ==
It may well be futile to look for themes in this account of rather entangled romances. The book only seems to say that people can always deceive themselves and life can't be regulated on "scientific" principles, which falls on the shoulders of Gordon as a main character.

Some have suggested that the contrast between scientist Wright and artist Longueville reflects the difference between William and Henry James. That's always a possibility, of course, but the book makes little of the comparison, instead preferring to make new connections between the two heroes. Angela's interventions at the book's conclusion, where she tidies up everybody's lives and makes things just perfect, some critics deem unbelievable.
