= The Real Right Thing =

1899 Short story by Henry James

"The Real Right Thing" is a short story written by Henry James and published in 1899.

== Plot summary ==
The story begins with the mention of Ashton Doyne, a distinguished writer, who left his wife a widow. Mrs. Doyne decides to write a biography about her husband. Three months after the author's death, Mr. George Withermore, a young journalist and friend of the author, is approached by Mr. Doyne's publishers stating that Mrs. Doyne wants him to take on the role of writing her husband's biography. Withermore is surprised with this request. Nevertheless, Withermore takes the offer. Mr. Withermore and Mrs. Doyne make an arrangement to finally meet. Mr. Withermore tells us his impression of Mrs. Doyne. He says she is "strange" and "never thought her an agreeable one". Mrs. Doyne's intention to write the biography was not based on her behalf of her husband but of herself. "She had not taken Doyne seriously enough in life, but the biography should be a solid reply to every imputation on herself." Mrs. Doyne takes George Withermore into her husband's study."

Mrs. Doyne leaves George Withermore alone for him to look over pieces of her husband's past. Every now and then she'd pop her head in to check on him, and he'd thank her for her help. It becomes apparent that even though her husband may not have trusted her, she trusted his friend George. George determines that although she acts okay, Mrs. Doyne is not at peace yet with the death of her husband and the anxiety-causing grief follows her around. Although she leaves the room quite frequently, George thinks that he can feel her; one night while sitting at Ashton's desk looking over his correspondence, he feels as though someone is watching behind him. It was Mrs. Doyne who had entered the room without making a sound. When this encounter happens, George admits that he believed it was Ashton himself standing behind him. Mrs. Doyne admits that she still feels as though Ashton is around her, which George finds very surprising. George tells Mrs. Doyne that working in the place his friend worked, using his utensils and reading his written word, he feels as though Ashton is just out for a walk, and it seems impossible that he is really gone. As their discussion on this matter deepens, Mrs. Doyne reveals to George that she truly believes Ashton is around, to which George laughs and says that they better keep him happy if he is. Mrs. Doyne looks at him with a "vague distress" look in her eyes. Mrs. Doyne exits the room that evening telling George that she only came in to see if he needed help, convincing George that she did only have his best interest at heart."

George starts to anticipate the evenings more and more each day because he enjoys going to the house and feeling a personal connection to Ashton's rumored presence; he looks forward to going there every evening. George is elated with feelings that what he is doing is exactly what his friend wanted him to do, and that he trusted George enough to let him in on his deepest secrets. George is determined to make Ashton and his secrets come out in a very beautiful way - only enhancing people's views on Ashton, not diminishing them. There are moments when George feels his dead friend lightly breathing in his hair and that he was leaning his elbows against the table in front of him. There were even moments where he would peer across the table and see his friend as vividly as he saw the papers in front of him. Ashton's spirit remains quietly within the room, almost like a "discreet librarian," just making sure that his prized possessions were being taken care of in the best way possible. George starts to hear the shuffling of documents that he placed on the table as well as papers he misplaced being put into his line of view. Drawers and boxes started opening on their own, and George is determined that he saw Ashton."

After receiving what he thought to be cues and guidance from the spirit of Ashton, he waited for days and made sure to take notice of anything that felt out of the ordinary and that could have been understood as the next step in the construction of the biography. As time passed, George began to feel “sad” and “uneasy” about not being surrounded by the spirit of Ashton. Suddenly, George found himself restless in the room and felt as if something had been out of place because of this feeling. As George finds himself on the stairs staring at Mrs. Doyne, they suddenly wind up in her room and begin to discuss what seems to be the passing spirit of Ashton throughout the house. Mrs. Doyne seems to have known that the spirit of her husband was in the room with George and knows that the spirit had gone back and forth between his room and hers and even passed them while they were on the stairs. After they speak about where his spirit had been lurking, they sit hand in hand in silence completely alone (at this point, they felt as if the spirit had vanished.) After George interrupts the silence because of a sudden feeling of anxiety, Mrs. Doyne states, “I only want to do the real right thing.” They begin to question what it is that they are doing and whether or not it is the right thing in honor of Ashton. George goes back and reviews what he had previously written to make sure it was thorough and suddenly, Mrs. Doyne feels the spirit.

Although Withermore and Ashton were best friends, the presence did not leave off good a feeling. In fact, Withermore got this negative feeling while he was writing about Ashton. Withermore wanted to let Mrs. Doyne know that maybe we shouldn't do what we are doing we shouldn't just lay out his life in front of this world letting everyone know about him. Withermore is not satisfied with what he is doing. At the end Withermore finally tells Mrs. Doyne to end the completion of the biography. Mrs. Doyne still doesn't want to give up on writing about his life but finally agrees with Withermore to bring an end in writing his biography.

== Characters ==
=== Ashton Doyne ===
- Ashton Doyne is a successful writer who died from undetermined causes. He was a very rich and fake man, always striving to make himself look the absolute best in front of his rich friends. He kept a lot of his personal journals and writings to himself in order to never be judged.

=== Ashton Doyne's Spirit ===
- Ashton Doyne's spirit comes into the study where Ashton always worked in order to keep his own watchful eye on what his wife and friend were doing with his belongings. It becomes apparent toward the end of the story that Ashton's ghost doesn't represent the Ashton people knew when he was alive; he is cold and distant to his wife and friend. He haunts George and Mrs. Doyne in order to stop him from writing the biography; he didn't want the biography to lead to an inaccurate perception of him to those who read it. Eventually he gets his wish when George and Mrs. Doyne stop working on the biography.

=== George Withermore ===
- George Withermore is a young, conscientious journalist and critic who lives a lower class lifestyle with little to show for himself. He had very few writings, and there were not a lot of people he associated with. However, he was a good friend of the more famed writer and recently deceased Ashton Doyne. George goes to meet with the widow Mrs. Doyne in order to collect materials of Ashton. It is very clear that George was very attached to his friend, and still was even after he died. As George compiles information for the biography on his friend, he notices a ghost-like character in the room with him, who he believes to be Ashton himself. He found this spirit to be a stranger; it wasn't kind and warmhearted to him like he remembered his friend as. George eventually gives up on writing the biography when he is haunted and scared too many times by Ashton's ghost.

=== Mrs. Doyne ===
- Mrs. Doyne: Her walk was "ugly and tragic" but also very striking; she gave off a rather elegant presence to those around her. Mrs. Doyne has superficial qualities; she wants complete control of what Mr. Withermore writes in the biography about her husband. She wants to make sure she doesn't come out looking bad to the circle of people her husband and she surrounded themselves with. She cares about "quantity" not "quality" for his book, only caring about how many volumes will be involved, not the context of what will be written. She often speaks for her husband, even though she barely knew him and it is determined that she didn't care to know him. She is a perfectionist who doesn't want to look anything less than stellar. She keeps a very watchful eye on what sources George is using and how he is using them. Like George, she starts to feel the presence of her deceased husband in the office where they work, and she agrees that they should give up on the biography.

== Critical Interpretations ==
=== The Supernatural in "The Real Right Thing" ===
In J.P Telotte's article "The Right Way With Reality," the significance of the supernatural is an important element to note in discussing “The Real Right Thing” by Henry James. The ghost of Ashton Doyne is ambiguous in appearance. Therefore, Telotte notes that the “significance of this distinction, and thus of the haunting and problematic vision it notes, rests, on the one hand, in its reminder of the many similar “ghosts that haunt James’s short fiction in his later period, and, on the other, in its pointed parallel to another problem of removed perception that dominates this story-- Withermore’s attempt to write Doyne’s biography, to reconstruct a life from the paper trail a man has left behind. In the conjunction of the modes of approaching reality, which this supposedly supernatural vision and the act of writing imply, we might discern not only a basic tension informing this story, but also a larger concert with presences and absences and a desire-- common to both readers and writers—to close the gap between the two, for it is a gap that informs much of James’s fiction and gives the reason to his recurrent “ghosts.”

=== Ambiguity in "The Real Right Thing" ===
Telotte discusses the play between the perceptions of our reality and the more concrete forms of reality, like written work, that James uses as a technique for his stories. In the "Real Right Thing", it is Ashton's ghost and the biography that represent these two forms of reality. What is the "Real Right Thing"? Is it this mysterious apparition or is it the biography? The difficulty in answering this question can be found in all of James's works. As readers, we have the desire to "fill in the gaps" and seek some sort of knowledge and certainty within James's works. Henry James poses this question but purposely leaves out the answer.”

=== Queer theory ===
In the reading "Resistance of Queory" by Hugh Stevens, Stevens' argument is that in the short story "The Real Right Thing" it suggests the theory of homosexuality between the characters Mr. Withermore and Ashton's spirit.” The dialogue between the two characters "is described in the kind of erotically charged language and overflowing with innuendo."

Stevens makes a reference to the story's text to support this theory:

"When once this fancy had begun to hang about him he welcomed it, persuaded it, encouraged it, quite cherished it, looking forward all day to feeling it renew itself in the evening, and waiting for the evening very much as one of a pair of lovers might wait for the hour of their appointment...Withermore rejoiced at moments to feel this certitude: there were times of dipping deep into some of Doyne's secrets when it was particularly pleasant to be able to hold that Doyne desired him, as it were, to know them."

Stevens suggests that the presence of the ghost is much more than its mention. Its presence is Doyne "coming out of the closet." Henry James was interested in J.A. Symonds theories of sexuality involving homosexual men. Therefore, Stevens suggests that James's interest in Symonds work is reflected in "The Real Right Thing."

"There is no certainty that James and Symonds shared a homosexual relationship but it is implied that they could have. James was asked to write Symonds biography."

However, James found the task difficult because James did not want to leave out information about Symonds' life. He felt that if he had to keep certain details out of the public's attention than he did not feel fit in writing a biography that does not present the entire colorful personality and life of the dead author.

Therefore, "The Real Right Thing" "meditates on the problematic relationship between a private sexual life, a marriage, and how these two things might be represented in the public biography of a dead writer-- all factors that James perceived as important in writings on Symonds after his death. It is implied that this attempt to write Symonds biography was the inspiration for the short story "The Real Right Thing."
