= The Way It Came =

1896 short story by Henry James

- Short story by Henry James
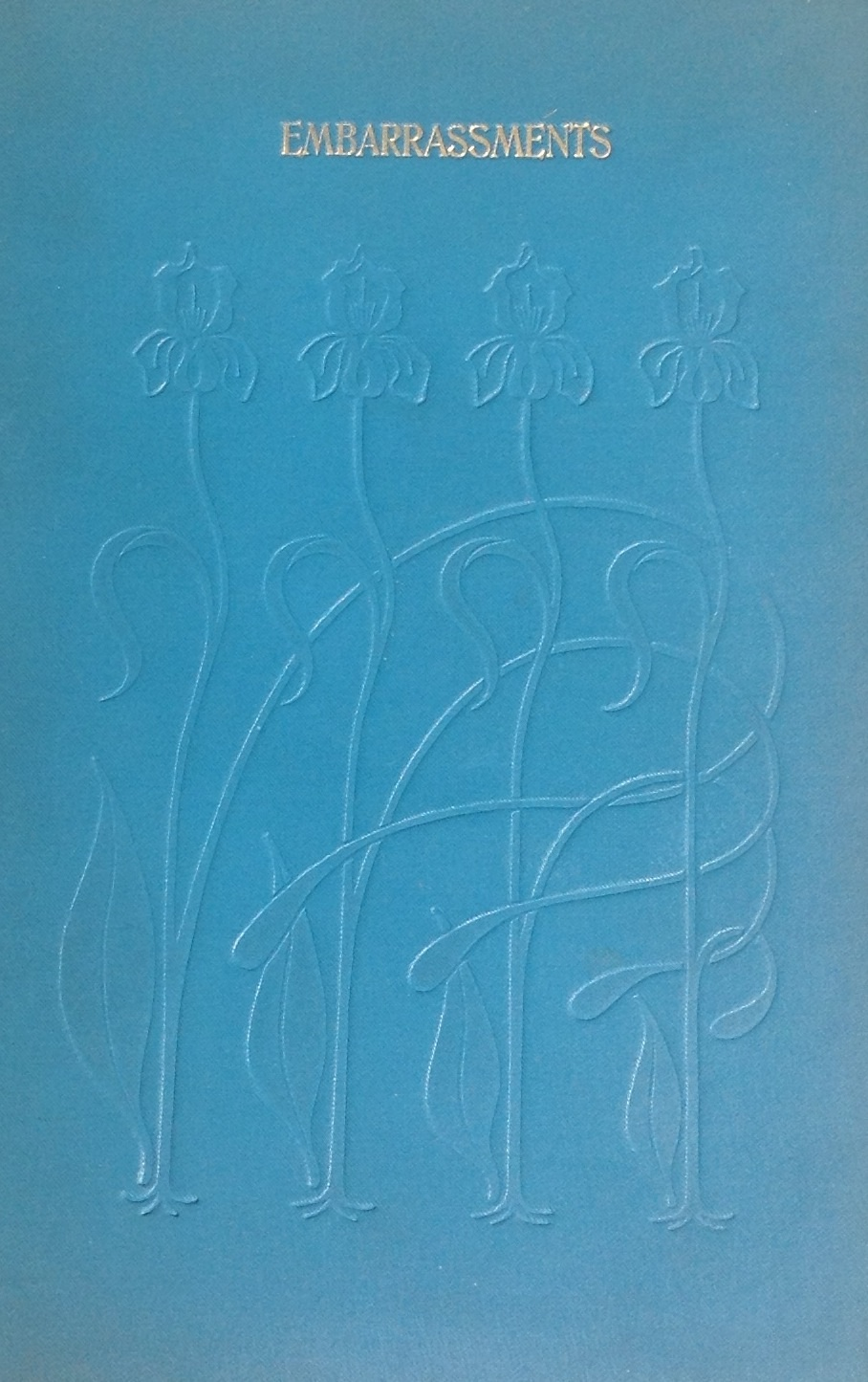
- Embarrassments, 1896, first U.K. edition of "The Way It Came"
- Country: United Kingdom
- Language: English
- Genre: Short story

Publication
- Published in: Chapman's Magazine of Fiction
- Publication type: Periodical
- Publisher: William Heinemann
- Media type: Print (Magazine)
- Publication date: 1896
- Pages: 55

"The Way It Came" is a short story published in 1896 in London by American writer Henry James. The unnamed female narrator recounts her obsession with the mystical coincidence of two friends who seem destined to meet and who apparently do unite in spirit after death.

Calling the story's original title "colourless", James renamed it "The Friends of the Friends" in 1909, revising it for inclusion in the New York Edition.

== Plot ==
"The Way It Came" begins with a frame story prologue, a 'cover note' by a magazine editor who judges a diarist's 'fragment' to be as fantastic as it is stylistically suspect. Because the diary is undated, its author leaving no names or initials to identity herself or her two friends, the editor advises that there is little public benefit to publishing such a sensationalistic account unless some corroborative clue to the characters' real-life identities can be found.

The (unnamed) narrator mentions to her (unnamed) male friend that his experience of "seeing" his mother at the moment of her death, though he was in fact far away and ignorant of her illness, parallels that of an (unnamed) female friend of hers who experienced something similar at the moment her father died. Both the man and woman express interest in meeting and comparing their accounts, but are apparently prevented from being introduced by a variety of accidents and thwarting circumstances. Their similar psychic visions, however, told among an increasingly wider circle of shared friends, gain added luster from the fact that the man and woman also share certain tastes, character traits, and superstitions, including a peculiar unwillingness ever to be photographed (thus they can have no idea what the other looks like, and would not recognize each other on a London street, for example).

After several years of friendship the narrator accepts her male friend's proposal of marriage; she also insists he allow himself to be photographed for the first time. Inviting her female friend for a long-scheduled tea to meet her fiancé, she has last minute reservations about introducing them before her wedding. Laying blame squarely on her fiancé for his unexpected absence—she had written a note to him implying the woman's afternoon visit was cancelled—she shows her female friend the photo of her husband with his address on the back, which she apparently turns over and reads.

Her fiancé's disapproval of her ruse prompts her to apologize to her female friend in person. But she arrives at her friend's home the following morning only to find she has unexpectedly died overnight. Describing her previous day's appearance and costume in detail, however, the narrator's fiancé hears the news of her death insisting that the woman in fact appeared to him without speaking for about 20 minutes in his home on the night of her death, echoing the spirit of his mother which appeared at the hour of her death. But investigation into whether the narrator's female friend had time to physically visit (and enter) the man's house before returning home, having learned his address from the photograph, proves inconclusive.

The narrator grows increasingly jealous of the memory her fiancé has of meeting her late female friend, and in time breaks off the engagement convinced he is bonded to her ghostly presence and possibly even in regular communication with her. Six years later the man dies, still unmarried, with the narrator bitterly insinuating that he took his own life.

== Publication history ==
"The Way It Came" first appeared in Chapman's Magazine of Fiction (London) in May 1896.

It is the final tale in Embarrassments, published June 1896 in a run of 1250 copies from the London publisher Heinemann and 1600 copies from the Macmillan Company in New York. Three other stories appear in the volume: "The Figure in the Carpet", "Glasses", and "The Next Time".
