= The Altar of the Dead =

1895 short story by Henry James

- Short story by Henry James
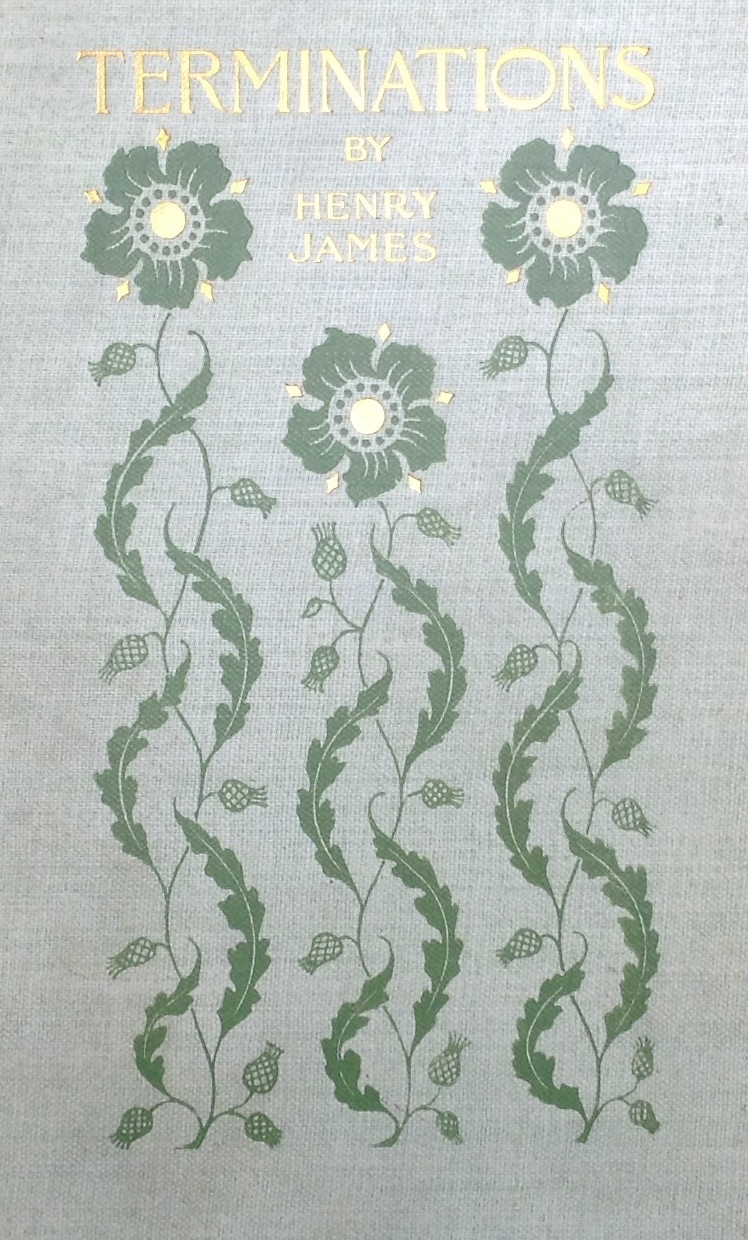
- Terminations, 1895, first U.S. edition of "The Altar of the Dead"
- Country: United Kingdom, United States
- Language: English
- Genre: Short story

Publication
- Publisher: William Heinemann, London; Harper & Brothers, New York City
- Media type: Print; Published as part of the short story collection Terminations
- Publication date: Heinemann: May 15, 1895; Harper: June 18, 1895

"The Altar of the Dead" is a short story by Henry James, first published in his collection Terminations in 1895. A fable of literally life and death significance, the story explores how the protagonist tries to keep the remembrance of his dead friends, to save them from being forgotten entirely in the rush of everyday events. He meets a woman who shares his ideals, only to find that the past places what seems to be an impassable barrier between them. Although James was not religious in any conventional sense, the story shows a deep spirituality in its treatment of mortality and the transcendent power of unselfish love.

== Plot summary ==
Aging George Stransom holds sacred the memory of the great love of his life, Mary Antrim, who died before they could be married. One day Stransom happens to read of the death of Acton Hague, a former friend who had done him a terrible harm. Stransom starts to dwell on the many friends and acquaintances he is now losing to death. He begins to light candles at a side altar in a Catholic church, one for each of his Dead, except Hague.

Later he notices a woman who regularly appears at the church and sits before his altar. He intuitively understands that she too honours her Dead, and they very gradually become friends. However Stransom later discovers that her Dead number only one: Acton Hague. Hague had wronged her too, but she has forgiven him. When his friend realises Stransom's feelings about Hague, she declares that she can no longer honour Hague at Stransom's altar. Stransom cannot bring himself to resolve the issue by forgiving Hague and adding a candle for him. This disagreement drives the two friends apart. Stransom's friend ceases visiting the altar, and Stransom himself can find no peace there.

Months later, Stransom, now dying, visits his altar one last time. Collapsing before the altar, he has a vision of Mary Antrim, and it seems that Mary Antrim is asking him to forgive Hague: "[H]e felt his buried face grow hot as with some communicated knowledge that had the force of a reproach. It suddenly made him contrast that very rapture with the bliss he had refused to another. This breath of the passion immortal was all that other had asked; the descent of Mary Antrim opened his spirit with a great compunctious throb for the descent of Acton Hague."

He turns and sees his friend, who has finally become reconciled to him, having decided to visit the altar to honour not her own Dead but Stransom's. Stransom, dying, tries to tell her that he is ready to add a candle for Hague, but is able only to say "One more, just one more". The story ends with his face showing "the whiteness of death." Thus Stransom's last words are rendered ambiguous.

== Key themes ==
As James got older himself, the deaths of his relatives and friends—especially his sister Alice James and fellow-novelist Constance Fenimore Woolson—began to turn his thoughts to how the "waves sweep dreadfully over the dead—they drop out and their names are unuttered." His Notebooks show this idea crystallizing into the story of a man who would make an actual private religion of remembrance of his dead.

But the story is far from a morbid, obsessive essay on death. The relationship between Stransom and his fellow-worshipper shows how forgiveness and love can overcome the wrongs of the past. The story is a parable for the living even more than an homage to the dead.

== Critical evaluation ==
Critics have generally rated this tale very high among James' works, with some calling it a "glorious fable," "magnificently written," and "one of his finest." James himself proudly placed the story at the head of volume 17 of the New York Edition (1907–09) of his fiction, before even "The Beast in the Jungle". The tale has appeared in a number of later anthologies.

So it is a little odd that in his Notebooks, James seemed dissatisfied with the story after he had started work on it. Some have speculated that James had not yet imagined the back-story of Acton Hague and Stransom's unnamed woman friend when he expressed his impatience with the tale. James was unable to place the story in any magazine, something which many critics have found almost ridiculous for work of such quality.

== Adaptations ==
François Truffaut directed the 1978 film La Chambre verte (The Green Room) based on "The Altar of the Dead". The director himself played the protagonist, with Nathalie Baye as the woman he befriends.
