= Notes on Novelists =

1914 book by Henry James

- First UK edition
- Author: Henry James
- Language: English
- Genre: Literary criticism
- Publisher: J.M. Dent & Sons Ltd., London; Charles Scribner's Sons, New York City
- Publication date: Dent: 13 Oct 1914; Scribner's: 14 Oct 1914
- Publication place: United Kingdom, United States
- Media type: Print
- Pages: Dent: 360; Scribner's: 455

Notes on Novelists is a book of literary criticism by Henry James published in 1914. The book collected essays that James had written over the preceding two decades on French, Italian, English and American writers. The book also contained a controversial essay, The New Novel, 1914, which passed judgment on various contemporary writers and occasioned much disagreement.

== Summary and themes ==
This is one of the last books that James saw through the press, and it contains his most mature and considered opinions on a number of writers. For instance, George Sand, an early enthusiasm of his, here becomes only a fading though pretty memory: "Her work, beautiful, plentiful and fluid, has floated itself out to sea even as the melting snows of the high places are floated."

Balzac, though, remains James' most reliable guide and master. He admires to the last Balzac's accounts of the "generative and contributive circumstances, of every discernible sort," which surround and condition his characters. This is entirely different from George Sand's fatal "looseness" of description and specification.

James includes two essays on Italian writers, Gabriele D'Annunzio and Matilde Serao. He notes the eloquence and power of their descriptions of sexual passion, but he believes sex becomes too isolated from the rest of their characters' lives. It is presented as "...only the act of a moment, beginning and ending in itself and disowning any representative character. From the moment it depends on itself alone for its beauty it endangers extremely its distinction, so precarious at the best. For what it represents, precisely, is poetically interesting; it finds its extension and consummation only in the rest of life." In The Wings of the Dove James provides a memorable example of how Densher and Kate's sexual passion does enter into the rest of their lives and becomes much more than the act of a moment.

In one of the London Notes James offers a last word on the forceful drama of Henrik Ibsen, whose mastery of the stage he clearly envied and could never emulate: "Well in the very front of the scene lunges, with extraordinary length of arm, the Ego against the Ego, and rocks, in a rigor of passion, the soul against the soul." Try as he might, James could never infuse such power into his plays.

=== Table of contents ===
Robert Louis Stevenson, 1894; Émile Zola, 1902; Gustave Flaubert, 1902; Honoré de Balzac, 1902; Honoré de Balzac, 1913; George Sand, 1897	George Sand, 1899; George Sand, 1914; Gabriele D'Annunzio, 1902; Matilde Serao, 1902; The New Novel, 1914; Dumas the Younger, 1895	The Novel in "The Ring and the Book," 1912; An American Art-Scholar: Charles Eliot Norton, 1908; London Notes, January, 1897; London Notes, June, 1897; London Notes, July, 1897; London Notes, August, 1897

== Critical evaluation ==
Some of the judgments James made in these essays, especially his pronouncements on younger novelists in The New Novel, were harshly dismissed as limited and incorrect. Hugh Walpole, among others, thought James got his verdicts in the essay "all wrong." But as he almost always did throughout his career as a critic, James treated his fellow writers with respect and understanding, and tried to enter into their points of view.

James really did believe in his famous "house of fiction" image, where writers looked at life from different windows and thus returned interestingly varied reports. He liked to get at reports very dissimilar to his own, as the easiest way to gain an "extension of life."
