= The Europeans =

1878 novel by Henry James

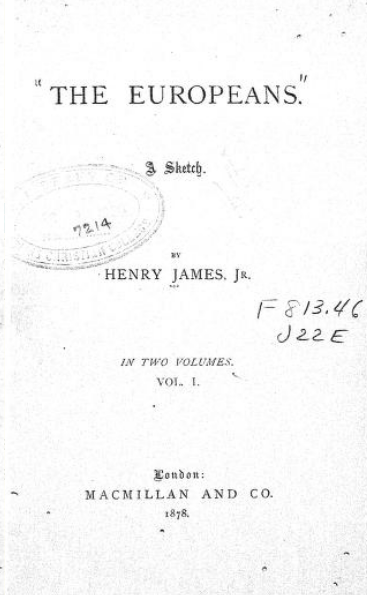
- Title page for The Europeans: A sketch (1878)
- Author: Henry James
- Language: English
- Genre: Novel
- Publisher: Macmillan and Co., London; Houghton, Osgood and Company, Boston
- Publication date: Macmillan: 18 September 1878; Houghton: 12 October 1878
- Publication place: United Kingdom, United States
- Media type: Print
- Pages: Macmillan: volume one, 255; volume two, 272; Houghton: 281, Penguin: 205
- Preceded by: The American
- Followed by: Confidence

The Europeans: A sketch is a short novel by Henry James, published in 1878. It is a comedy contrasting the behaviour and attitudes of two visitors from Europe with those of their relatives living in the "New" World of New England. The novel first appeared as a serial in The Atlantic Monthly for July–October 1878. James made numerous minor revisions for the first book publication.

== Plot introduction ==
The tale opens in Boston and New England in the middle of the 19th century, and describes the experiences of two European siblings shifting from the Old to the New World. The two protagonists are Eugenia Münster and Felix Young, who since their early childhood have lived in Europe, moving from France to Italy and from Spain to Germany. In this last place, Eugenia entered into a morganatic marriage with Prince Adolf of Silberstadt-Schreckenstein, the younger brother of the reigning prince who is now being urged by his family to dissolve the marriage for political reasons. Because of this, Eugenia and Felix decide to travel to America to meet their distant cousins, so that Eugenia may "seek her fortune" in the form of a wealthy American husband.

All the cousins live in the countryside around Boston and spend a lot of time together. The first encounter with them corresponds to the first visit of Felix to his family. Mr Wentworth's family is a puritanical one, far from the Europeans' habits. Felix is fascinated by the patriarchal Mr Wentworth, his son, Clifford, age 20, and two daughters, Gertrude and Charlotte. They spend a lot of time together with Mr. Robert Acton and his sister Lizzie, their neighbours and cousins.

Eugenia's reaction after this first approach differs from Felix's. She realizes she could not live with these relatives, so different from herself, but is happy to accept the gift of a little house—she cherishes her independence and in keeping a certain distance. In contrast, her brother is very happy to share all his time with Charlotte and Gertrude, spending hours in their piazza or garden creating portraits of the two ladies.

== Plot summary ==
Eugenia and her brother Felix arrive in Boston. The next day Felix visits their cousins. He first meets Gertrude, who is shirking attendance at church and reading romantic literature instead. He stays over for dinner. The next day Eugenia visits them. Three days later their uncle Mr Wentworth suggests they stay in a little house close to theirs. Felix suggests making a portrait of his uncle. When Mr. Wentworth refuses, he makes plans to do a painting of Gertrude instead. One day, Gertrude, out walking, encounters a young clergyman, Mr Brand who has been waiting for her. He renews his declaration of love, but Gertrude does not wish to hear it, and asks him to go away, weeping afterwards out of frustration (for her family is pushing her to accept Mr. Brand). She then sits for Felix who is doing her portrait. During their conversation he wonders why his American relatives seem so little concerned for the pleasures of life, living by strict standards, seeming not to think of their own individual happiness.

Eugenia notices the one eligible and wealthy bachelor, Robert Acton, cousin to the Wentworths, and they begin spending time together. Eugenia refers little to her marriage other than telling Mr. Acton she has a paper the husband's family wishes her to sign (which would dissolve the marriage). She pays a visit to Mrs Acton and during their conversation tells a white lie – that her son has been talking about her a lot – which comes across as a faux-pas. In particular, Robert Acton notes the lie. Mr Wentworth tells Felix that his young son Clifford got suspended from Harvard University owing to his drinking problem. Felix suggests that the influence of a cultivated older woman might help him to improve his manners—a woman such as his sister, and indeed, the young Clifford begins visiting Eugenia.

Meanwhile, Felix and Gertrude are falling in love. Eventually, Gertrude tells him her father wants her to marry the minister Mr Brand, though she does not love him. Felix has noticed how Gertrude's sister Charlotte seems attracted to Mr. Brand, and is convinced she is in love with him. He speaks to Mr. Brand, implying as much. He and Gertrude would like to see Mr. Brand and Charlotte get together, as it would leave him and Gertrude free to pursue their own love affair.

One evening, Robert Acton, who has been away a few days (and is beginning to believe he is in love with Eugenia) goes late to visit her. In fact, Clifford was with Eugenia at the time, but when she realized Robert was coming she had Clifford hide in a back room. During her conversation with Mr. Acton, the subject of her marriage comes up again, and he also proposes they go together—alone—to see Niagara Falls. Clifford comes unexpectedly out of his hiding place and there is a very awkward moment. Clifford leaves and Eugenia makes up an untrue story about the young man being at her home. Later, in talking with Clifford, Mr. Acton realizes she had not told the truth. The fact that she can lie begins to weigh upon his thoughts, and he ceases for several days to go visit her.

Meanwhile, Felix tells his sister Eugenia he wants to marry Gertrude; she lies also to her brother in claiming Robert Acton asked her to marry him but that she is not sure she wants to. She has understood that her goal of finding a wealthy man in the United States has failed but she has her pride. She decides to go back to Germany. She makes a farewell visit to Mrs Acton, sees Robert as she is leaving and claims to have sent the annulment papers to Germany (this also will turn out to be untrue). Mr. Acton expresses regret that she has decided to leave—but he makes no definitive proposition to her to keep her there.

Felix makes a visit to his uncle and asks for Gertrude's hand. His uncle is shocked at first, but his other daughter, Charlotte, speaks in favor of the match, then Gertrude comes in and declares she will marry Felix, and finally Mr. Brand comes in to say he would like to marry the young couple. Felix has found his felicity in America—he and Gertrude will marry and then live and travel in Europe—she will see the world she has longed to see. Mr Brand and Charlotte will also later marry, far more suited to one another than Gertrude was for Mr. Brand. But the Baroness Eugenia Münster, unsuccessful in her designs of seeking her fortune in America, refuses even to stay for her brother's wedding. She packs up her things, and returns to Europe.

== Characters ==
- Baroness Eugenia-Camilla-Dolores Münster, age 33, Felix's older sister and the wife of Prince Adolf of Silberstadt-Schreckenstein in a morganatic marriage
- Felix Young, age 28, Eugenia's younger brother; an artist who does portraits and likes music and the theatre
- The Reigning Prince, the brother of Eugenia's husband
- Prince Adolf, of Silberstadt-Schreckenstein, Eugenia's husband in a morganatic marriage, whose family demands their divorce
- Mr Wentworth, Eugenia's and Felix's uncle, who went to Harvard University
- Gertrude Wentworth, age 22 or 23 years old
- Charlotte Wentworth, Gertrude's older sister
- Clifford Wentworth, a young man in his 20s, who has been suspended from Harvard University because of a drinking problem
- Mr Brand, a Unitarian minister, who helps Clifford remain abstemious
- Mr Robert Acton, a young man who increased his fortune in China, who also went to Harvard University
- Miss Lizzie Acton, Robert's sister
- Mrs Acton, their mother, an invalid, age 55 when Eugenia meets her
- Augustine, Eugenia's maid
- Mrs Whiteside, Eugenia's and Felix's mother
- Mr Adolphus Young, Eugenia's and Felix's father
- Mr Broderip, a friend of Mr Wentworth, who also went to Harvard University

== Allusions to other works ==
- The authors and works of fiction mentioned are: John Keats, The Arabian Nights, the Bible (Queen of Sheba, Solomon), Madame de Staël, Madame Recamier, Charles Dickens's The Life and Adventures of Nicholas Nickleby, Ralph Waldo Emerson.
- Mr Wentworth reads the North American Review and the Boston Daily Advertiser.
- The visual arts are alluded to with Raphael.

== Allusions to actual history ==
Eugenia says that her "father used to tell [her]" of General George Washington. Meanwhile, Gertrude imagines that Eugenia will be like the lithograph of Empress Josephine hung in the Wentworth's parlor.

== Major themes ==
One of the more important themes of the novel is the comparison between European and American women, which James stresses through the great difference existing between Eugenia and the Wentworth ladies. Madame Münster is independent, modern, and displays hauteur. Gertrude and Charlotte lack this self-possession. For example, they tend to comply with their father's suggestions. When Mr. Wentworth tries to arrange a marriage between Mr. Brand and Gertrude to which she objects, it is difficult for her to clearly express her preference. The sisters spend most of their free time with the family until the moment in which Gertrude discovers herself to be in love with Felix. Her love encourages her to take a new perspective on the world and to resist the presumptions of her family. She reacts against her father's decision regarding Mr. Brand, explaining that she never will marry a man she does not love. Instead, Gertrude will marry Felix and leave America.

The difference between Europeans and New Englanders manifests itself in particular in the expression of feelings and emotions, which are very sensitive for the former: love is more important than money. Moreover, American people are more straitlaced, and they have closer links with tradition. The most important thing in life for those living in the 'New World' is, ironically, respecting old traditions and accepting moral rules. Mr Wentworth is profoundly surprised and fascinated by Eugenia's marriage experience as is Robert Acton; in the Americans' eyes, Eugenia is a perplexing woman.

== Literary significance and criticism ==
The omniscient narrator uses a very fine and cultivated language, sometimes he prefers Latin diction; preferring to introduce very long, detailed descriptions of the setting and of the characters, from both a psychological and a physical point of view. In addition to the contributions of the narrator, dialogue helps the author to introduce his characters and to show their reactions to unfolding events. Critic Robert Gale credited James with a "specifically well-delineated New England" in the book, which he found "charming".

F.R. Leavis, the influential English literary critic, had a high opinion of this brief work, claiming:

"The Europeans, the visiting cousins, are there mainly to provide a foil for the American family, a study of the New England ethos being James's essential purpose.... Nevertheless James's irony is far from being unkind; he sees too much he admires in the ethos he criticises to condemn it.... James is not condemning or endorsing either New England or Europe.... This small book, written so early in James's career, is a masterpiece of major quality."

Others, most notably the author's brother William James, faulted the novel's "slightness." Henry James replied in a 14 November 1878 letter that he somewhat agreed with the criticism:

"I was much depressed on reading your letter by your painful reflections on The Europeans, but now, an hour having elapsed, I am beginning to hold up my head a little; the more so as I think I myself estimate the book very justly & am aware of its extreme slightness. I think you take these things too rigidly and unimaginatively—too much as if an artistic experiment were a piece of conduct, to which one's life were somehow committed; but I think you're quite right in pronouncing the book 'thin' & empty."

In another letter to his friend Elizabeth Boott, James blamed the shortness of the novel on the fact that the editor of the Atlantic Monthly, William Dean Howells, required that it occupy only 100 pages in the magazine. James had also promised Howells his next story would have a happy ending with "distinct matrimony" after the magazine serialized The American (1877), in which the lovers are separated in the end. According to James he "did [hit] it off mechanically in the closing paragraphs. I was not at all weary of the tale in the end, but I had agreed to write it in one hundred Atlantic pages, and its abrupt ending came from outward pressure - not from internal failing."

James excluded the novel from the New York Edition of his fiction (1907–09). Among others speculating on the reasons for this exclusion, critic Oscar Cargill commented that "the intimate contemporary judgment and misfortune may have been a lingering decisive factor in James' mind."

It has also been suggested by one author that Felix's rootless Bohemian origin, as well as his "eternal gaiety", were signifiers of his covert homosexuality.

== Film adaptation ==
The 1979 Merchant Ivory Productions film The Europeans starred Lee Remick as Eugenia and received six award nominations. The movie received a number of lukewarm reviews as a somewhat over-literary adaptation. Critic Chris Elliot noted the movie's "opaque refinements and elusive intentions, a predilection for intricacies of language and manners." Roger Ebert similarly demurred that the movie was "a classroom version of James, a film with no juice or life of its own."

== See also ==
- Drive-Away Dolls, a 2024 film where one of the main characters reads The Europeans throughout
