= The Real Thing (story) =

- Short story by Henry James
- First book publication
- Country: United Kingdom
- Language: English
- Genre: Short story

Publication
- Published in: Black and White
- Publication type: Periodical
- Media type: Print (Magazine)
- Publication date: April 16, 1892
- Pages: 6

"The Real Thing" is a short story by Henry James, first syndicated by S. S. McClure in multiple American newspapers and then published in the British publication Black and White in April 1892 and the following year as the title story in the collection, The Real Thing and Other Stories published by Macmillan.

== Plot summary ==
The narrator, an unnamed illustrator and aspiring painter, hires a faded genteel couple, the Monarchs, as models, after they have lost most of their money and must find some line of work. They are the "real thing" in that they perfectly represent the aristocratic type, but they prove inflexible for the painter's work. He comes to rely much more on two lower-class subjects who are nevertheless more capable: Oronte, an Italian, and Miss Churm, a lower-class Englishwoman.

The illustrator finally has to get rid of the Monarchs, especially after his friend and fellow artist Jack Hawley criticizes the work in which the Monarchs are represented. Hawley says that the pair has hurt the narrator's art, perhaps permanently. In the final line of the story the narrator says he is "content to have paid the price—for the memory".
