= Picture and Text =

- First edition
- Author: Henry James
- Language: English
- Genre: Art criticism
- Publisher: Harper and Brothers, New York City
- Publication date: 2-June-1893
- Publication place: United States
- Media type: Print
- Pages: 175

Picture and Text is a collection of essays by Henry James on the art of illustration, published in 1893. The essays are brief profiles of the principal illustrators for Harper and Brothers books and magazines, and has been remembered for extensive and perceptive essays on John Singer Sargent and Honoré Daumier. Included with the essays on black-and-white illustration of texts is a discussion in dialogue form about the similar relation between scenery and play in the theater.

== Summary and themes ==
Although originally conceived as an extended puff for Harper artists, who were also personal friends, the book presents some general ideas about the relation between author and illustration, picture and text, as well as the advancing technology of illustration. Both in print and in the theater, James welcomes advances in the technology of realism, but complains if the visual dominates author and actor. He praises the black-and-white engravings of the illustrators for their tact and their illumination of settings, but criticizes elaborate modern stage scenery that overwhelms the actor's art. These essays, although slight, are illustrated with drawings of each other by the artist subjects, and is itself an example of what James extols, as well as being a rare extended essay by James on the unity of the arts.

The illustrators of whom he wrote were an Anglo-American group, all personal friends, at a time when Harper was his principal publisher. They were known in the day for their summer gatherings at the village of Broadway in the Cotswolds, where for several years James joined them, and where Sargent gained his first footing among British artists. Among the artists in the group, Charles Reinhart illustrated some of James' own fiction, Alfred Parsons designed James's gardens at Lamb House, and the sets for James' play Guy Domville whose first, raucous performance he attended. Edwin Abbey and Sargent later collaborated on the enormous wall paintings for the Boston Public Library, and were among the leading artists of their day.

James' treatment of his friend Honore de Daumier was a welcome effort on behalf of an artist many considered little more than a political cartoonist. James found an "impressive depth" in Daumier's portrayal of the peculiar and the (sometimes) ugly. Many of Daumier's subjects are now remembered only in his often slashing work, but that's appropriate because all art "prolongs...preserves...consecrates...raises from the dead."

In his essay on his protégé John Singer Sargent, James marvels at the painter's complete knowledge of his art and his unfailing technical proficiency. James particularly admires Sargent's portraits of women, such as Miss Burckhardt (not identified by name but illustrated in the magazine text of the article) and Madame X (called Madame G in the essay). "There is no greater work of art than a great portrait," James concludes, and Sargent's portraits combine "quick perception" and "lingering reflection."

The essays on Daumier and Sargent have frequently been reprinted, but the book as a whole has been out of print since its first edition, in part because the black-and-white engravings that are its principal subject were so soon to be displaced by photographs and colored illustrations.

=== Table of contents ===
Black and White; Edwin A. Abbey; Charles S. Reinhart; Alfred Parsons	John S. Sargent; Honoré Daumier; After the Play

== Critical evaluation ==
The book has not attracted much attention. In the 1950s some critics held James' enthusiasm for Sargent against him. When Sargent's own critical position improved, James' appreciation of his fellow expatriate seemed more perceptive and praiseworthy.

Many critics have lauded James for his warm and humorous essay on Daumier, which helped establish the caricaturist as a serious artist. James' essays on the other artists in the book have sometimes been dismissed as little more than cheerful compliments for professional acquaintances. In the second volume of his biography of James, Sheldon Novick has noted the importance of the Broadway group of artists to James personally, reproduced some of their portraits and discussed the broader ideas visible in these slight essays.
