= The Liar (short story) =

"The Liar" is a short story by Henry James which first appeared in The Century Magazine in May–June 1888, and in book form the following year (Macmillan and Co., London).

It is the story of a young man's dilemma when he meets a woman he used to love, and finds her married to a man of a vile, dishonest nature. Concerned that her own purity has been spoilt, he tests her to see whether she is only shielding her husband out of love, and is shocked to find that she will go even to the lengths of sacrificing an innocent victim rather than admitting her husband's true character.

== Plot ==
Oliver Lyon, a successful artist, is lodging at the house of an elderly baronet, Sir David, whose portrait he has been engaged to paint. At dinner on the night of his arrival he recognises among the company a woman with whom he used to be in love. He has not seen her for twelve years, and knows her to be married. Her husband, Colonel Clement Capadose, is a brilliant and handsome gentleman with whom she appeared to be very much in love, and Lyon, having accepted her as something unattainable to him, feels no real jealousy towards him, being satisfied with her apparent happiness. He at first admires the Colonel, but over the course of the dinner, when he narrates a good many improbable stories that Lyon cannot believe, his opinion of him is rather altered, although he imputes it to a romantic tendency on the Colonel's part. However, he is rather startled by what appears a plain lie when the colonel tells him of a recent occurrence in the house, which his host Arthur Ashmore, the son of Sir David, states to be completely false.

Afterwards, while painting Sir David's portrait, the baronet explains to him that Colonel Capadose is a compulsive liar. He extenuates his fault, saying that he has no bad intentions, but merely cannot give a straight answer. His wife, Lyon realises, tries to shield him by not revealing his lies, and even supporting what he says. Sufficiently shocked by his, the artist hopes that she never actively participates in her husband's deceptions, and wonders how much her nature has been corrupted. To find out how far she will go to save his name, Lyon spends as much time as possible with them, painting first a portrait of their nine-year-old daughter Amy, and then of the Liar himself.

In the portrait, Lyon attempts to express the Colonel's deceitful nature fully, hoping that he might awaken his wife's moral sense. He tries to draw Mrs Capadose out about her husband's character, but she only says that his nature is noble, and hopes that Lyon will express no more than this in his picture. To capture the spirit of the Liar more fully, he encourages him to talk as much as possible during the sittings, and is given in return a vast amount of invented facts and anecdotes. On one occasion a poor model, Geraldine, comes into the studio seeking work. Lyon sends her away, but Colonel Capadose falsely tells him that she is not a model at all, but a mad woman with a vendetta against him who has been pursuing him for years.

Sometime later the season ends, and the Capadoses leave with the portrait nearly finished. Lyon also leaves the town, but returns briefly to see his unfinished picture, finding that the Capadoses have come unannounced into his rooms. Coming upon them unnoticed, Lyon realises that Mrs Capadose has seen in the picture what he hoped she would, her husband's vile nature, and that she is ashamed of him. She terms the portrait 'cruel' but tries to leave before her husband, in a passion, rips up the canvas. They depart without knowing that Lyon saw them, and he too leaves, having seen the woman Geraldine about the house.

Lyon waits to see how the couple explain events. When they return to the town soon after, they act as if nothing has happened, and ask for the sitting to recommence. When Lyon tells them what has happened, they feign ignorance and Colonel Capadose, who also met Geraldine on the day, instantly accuses her of the deed. This is the last straw for Lyon; despite Sir David's affirmation that the Liar would never harm anyone, he was now 'wantonly sacrificing an innocent person', and his wife was an accessory to the misdeed. After giving her one last chance to confess to the deception, and to admit that she only shielded her husband from love, which Lyon could readily forgive, he leaves her to spare her further pain, remarking, 'She was still in love with the Colonel - he had trained her too well.’
