= The American Scene =

Book by Henry James

- First US edition
- Author: Henry James
- Language: English
- Genre: Travel writing
- Publisher: Chapman and Hall, London; Harper & Brothers, Boston
- Publication date: Chapman: 29 January 1907; Harper: 7 February 1907
- Publication place: United Kingdom, United States
- Media type: Print
- Pages: Chapman: 465; Harper: 443

The American Scene is a book of travel writing by Henry James about his trip through the United States in 1904–1905. Ten of the fourteen chapters of the book were published in the North American Review, Harper's and the Fortnightly Review in 1905 and 1906. The first book publication was in 1907, and there were significant differences between the American and the English versions of the book.

Without question the most controversial and critically discussed of James' travel books, The American Scene sharply attacked what James saw as the rampant materialism and frayed social structure of turn-of-the-century America. The book has generated controversy for its treatment of various ethnic groups and political issues. The book still has relevance to such current topics as immigration policy, environmental protection, economic growth, and racial tensions.

== Summary and themes ==
James spent nearly a year on his American tour from August, 1904 to July, 1905. He travelled the entire country and even made decent money from public lectures, usually to ladies' organizations that he made "pay me through the nose." The American Scene covers his trips up and down the Eastern seaboard, concentrating on New York City and New England. A second volume, which was to recount his experiences in the Midwest and West, never got written.

The book as it stands has been praised and damned, respected and dismissed. The extreme reactions may result from the contradictions inherent in the book itself. To take perhaps the most notorious example, James indulged in racist criticism of black people as incapable of alertness and attention, then praised the "most accomplished" W. E. B. Du Bois' The Souls of Black Folk as "the only Southern book of any distinction for many a year."

Similarly, James was full of misgivings about unrestricted immigration and its effect on America's already thinly stretched social fabric. But he conceded that the strong assimilative forces of American life would work on the children of the immigrants, "the younger generation who will fully profit, rise to the occasion, and enter into the privilege" of full citizenship.

James also constantly criticized the materialism and greed he saw all around him in American business. But he again admitted that the result was a huge increase in material well-being for the average person: "this immense, vivid general lift of poverty and general appreciation of the living unit's paying property in himself." It was in this widespread prosperity "that the picture seems most to clear and the way to jubilation most to open."

Yet James' account was finally a grim one. In the last section of the book he denounced America's spoliation of "the great lonely land", its frantic economic development, and its festering social tensions. The consequence was a "devil's dance" which made the future look uncertain and threatening. This final section was omitted from the American edition of the book, much to James' indignation.

=== Table of contents ===
- New England: An Autumn Impression
- New York City Revisited
- New York City and the Hudson: A Spring Impression
- New York City: Social Notes
- The Bowery and Thereabouts
- The Sense of Newport
- Boston
- Concord and Salem
- Philadelphia
- Baltimore
- Washington
- Richmond
- Charleston
- Florida

== Critical evaluation ==
Sharon Cameron in her study of James' concept of consciousness uses The American Scene to introduce her thesis that James is counterintuitive in his representation of consciousness.
