= The Lesson of the Master =

1888 novella by Henry James

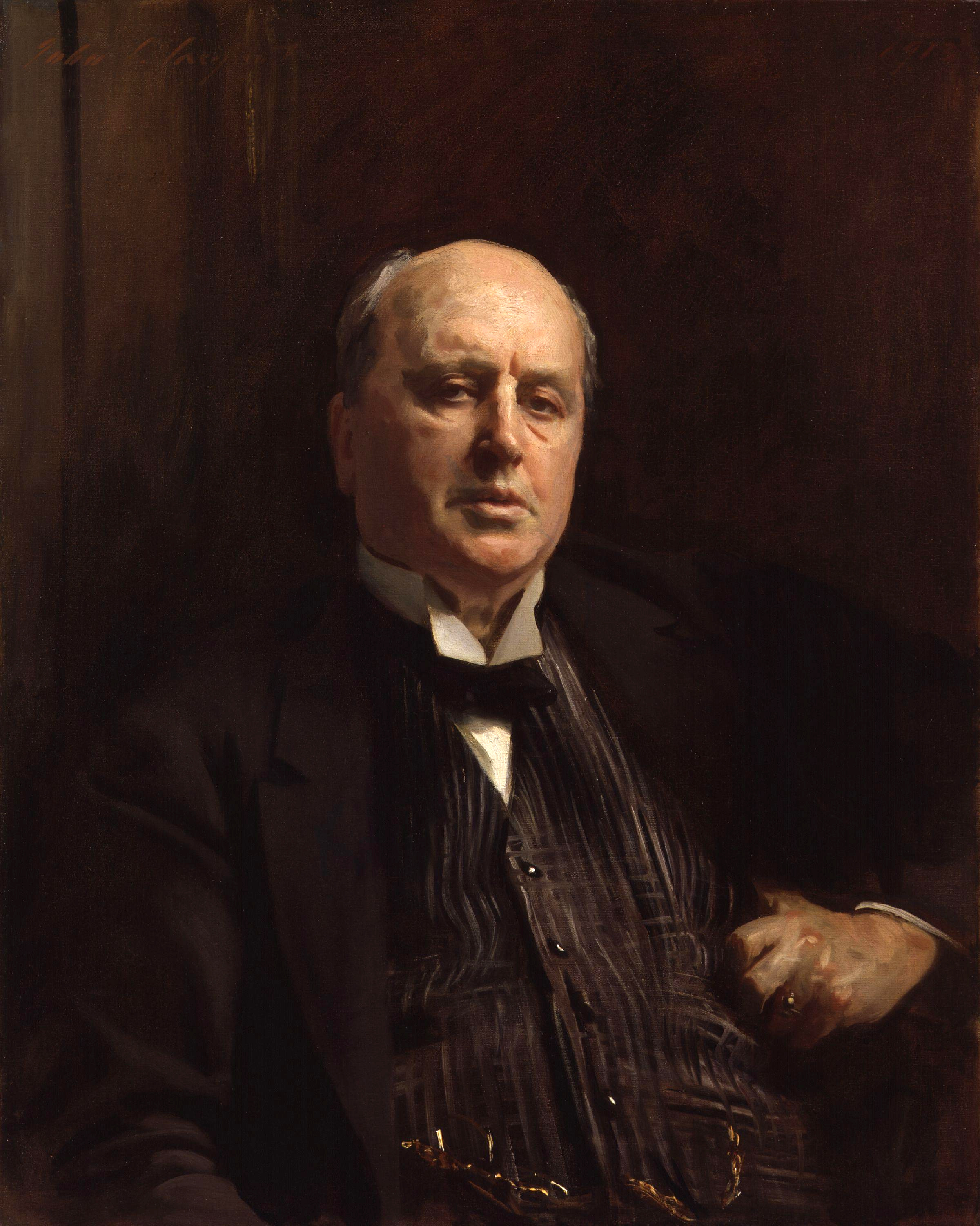
Portrait of Henry James by John Singer Sargent

The Lesson of the Master is a novella written by Henry James, originally published in 1888. The Guardian writer Jonathan Jones described the story as that of "a writer [who] must choose between the perfection of art and the seductive compromises of real life."

== Plot summary ==
The novella tells the story of a young writer, Paul Overt, who meets Henry St. George, a famous novelist Overt admires. During that time, Overt also meets and falls in love with Marian Fancourt, a young woman who admires both St. George's and Overt's work. During their meetings, St. George, who is married, advises Overt against getting married and having children, arguing that a wife and children will be the death of Overt's creativity and career. Overt then takes an extended vacation in which he considers St. George's advice. When he returns, he learns that St. George's wife had died and that St. George and Marian Fancourt had become engaged. Overt feels that St. George had set him up in order to have Miss Fancourt for himself, but St. George insists that by marrying her, he saved Overt and his career.

== Scholarship ==
Scholars have characterized the novella as a retelling of the legend of St. George and the Dragon. The scholar Adeline Tinter regarded James's tale as an ironic variation the story, one in which St. George (Henry St. George) frees himself from one dragon, only to fall into the clutches of another (Marion Fancourt), in order to save the Eastern princess (Paul Overt).
