= Theatricals =

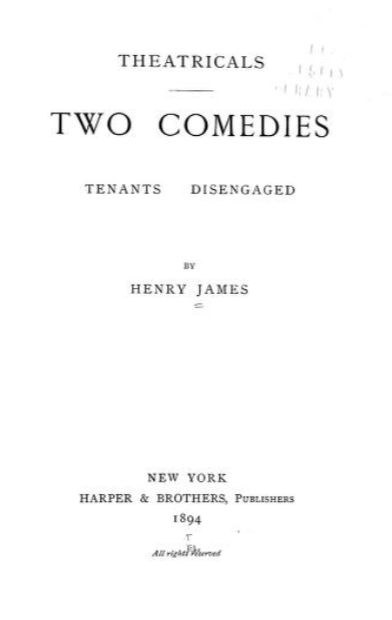
- Author: Henry James
- Language: English
- Genre: Plays
- Publisher: Osgood, McIlvane & Co., London
- Publication date: 9 June 1894
- Publication place: United Kingdom
- Media type: Print
- Pages: 325

Theatricals is a book of two plays by Henry James published in 1894, entitled Tenants and Disengaged.

== Plot summaries ==
Based on a short story Flavien: Scènes de la vie contemporaine by Henri Rivière, Tenants tells the story of a widowed Englishman, Sir Frederick Byng, his son Norman, and his ward Mildred Stanmore. Norman and Mildred are in love, but Sir Frederick disapproves and forces his son to take a post in India. Meanwhile, Sir Frederick's former mistress, the long-widowed Eleanor Vibert, rents his lodge at Clere, near the family house. Eleanor brings along her son Claude, who (unknown to himself) is the illegitimate child of Sir Frederick.

After many complications, Mildred and the returned Norman will marry, Claude learns the truth about his parentage and forgives his mother, and Eleanor refuses Sir Frederick's offer of marriage. Mildred and Eleanor embrace and reconcile.

Disengaged is based on James' own story, The Solution. At Brisket Place, forty miles outside London, a naive army captain, Llewellyn Prime, is made to believe that he has compromised Blandina Wigmore and must propose to her. He does so and is his proposal is accepted.

Eventually, the youthful widow Mrs. Jasper gets Prime out of his engagement to Blandina and then accepts his marriage proposal. She was one of the plotters who had got him to propose to Blandina in the first place, but she quickly repented. Meanwhile, Blandina accepts Percy Trafford, but comes to regret her choice.
