= A Little Tour in France =

Book by Henry James

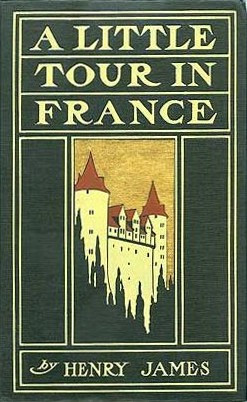
- Cover of the 1900 edition, published by Houghton Mifflin
- Author: Henry James
- Illustrator: Thomas Watson Bell (1900 edition pictured)
- Language: English
- Genre: Travel writing
- Publisher: James R. Osgood and Company, Boston
- Publication date: 5 September 1884
- Publication place: United States
- Media type: Print
- Pages: 255

A Little Tour in France is a book of travel writing by American writer Henry James. Published under the title En Province in 1883–1884 as a serial in The Atlantic Monthly, the book recounts a six-week tour James made of many provincial towns in France, including Tours, Bourges, Nantes, Toulouse, Arles and several others. The first book publication was in 1884. A second, extensively revised edition was published in 1900 with illustrations by Joseph Pennell.

James gives the idea for the book in the first paragraph of the first installment of the original magazine serial: "France may be Paris, but Paris is not France." He conceived the book as a description of and even homage to the provinces. James had tried living in Paris before settling in London in 1876. He returned to France in 1882 to discover more of French provincial life than he had previously been able to see.

== Summary and themes ==
James began his tour in Touraine, then journeyed southwest through Provence, and then north along the flooding Rhône River to Burgundy. The resulting book was a mix of art and architecture criticism, references to classic literature as well as guide-books and pamphlets, sharp observation of people and places, and knowledgeable discussion of French history and culture — all communicated in an easygoing, urbane, witty style.

James could never resist the piquant detail, like the chatty nun who guided him through Marmoutier Abbey or the tough soldiers quartered in the dismal old papal residence at Avignon. He was particularly interested in ancient cathedrals and castles, the less restored the better, though he hardly neglects present-day realities of shabby inns, talkative diners, uncomfortable train rides, and dreary museums. There's little attempt at generalization or abstract theorizing. James is usually content to describe what he saw as accurately as possible. He wrote in a letter of November 12, 1882, to Isabella Gardner: "I have seen more of France than I had ever seen before, and on the whole liked it better."

=== Table of contents ===
Preface; Introductory; Tours; Tours: the Cathedral; Tours; Blois; Chambord; Amboise; Chenonceaux; Azay-le-Rideau; Langeais	Loches; Bourges; Bourges: Jacques Cœur; Le Mans; Angers; Nantes; La Rochelle; Poitiers; Angoulême; Toulouse; Toulouse: the Capitol	Toulouse: Saint-Sernin; Carcassonne; Carcassonne; Narbonne; Montpellier; The Pont du Gard; Aigues-Mortes; Nîmes; Tarascon; Arles	Arles: the Museum; Les Baux; Avignon; Villeneuve-lès-Avignon; Vaucluse; Orange; Mâcon; Bourg-en-Bresse; Beaune; Dijon

== Sources ==
- Henry James Collected Travel Writings - The Continent - A Little Tour in France, Italian Hours, Other Travels edited by Richard Howard (New York: Library of America 1993) ISBN 0-940450-77-1
