= The Beast in the Jungle =

1903 novella by Henry James

- First edition (UK)
- Author: Henry James
- Language: English
- Publisher: Methuen, London; Charles Scribner's Sons, New York City
- Publication date: Methuen: February 26, 1903; Scribner's: February 26, 1903
- Publication place: United Kingdom, United States
- Media type: Print (hardback & paperback); Published as part of the short story collection The Better Sort
- OCLC: 24050323

The Beast in the Jungle is a 1903 novella by Henry James, first published as part of the collection The Better Sort. Almost universally considered one of James' finest short narratives, this story treats appropriately universal themes: loneliness, fate, love and death. The parable of John Marcher and his peculiar destiny has spoken to many readers who have speculated on the worth and meaning of human life.

== Plot summary ==
John Marcher is reacquainted with May Bartram, a woman he knew ten years earlier while living in southern Italy, who remembers his odd secret: Marcher is seized with the belief that his life is to be defined by some catastrophic or spectacular event, lying in wait for him like a "beast in the jungle". May decides to buy a house in London with the money she inherited from a great aunt, and to spend her days with Marcher, curiously awaiting what fate has in store for him. Marcher is a hopeless fatalist, who believes that he is precluded from marrying so that he does not subject his wife to his "spectacular fate".

He takes May to the theater and invites her to an occasional dinner, but does not allow her to get close to him. As he sits idly by and allows the best years of his life to pass, he takes May down as well, until the denouement where he learns that the great misfortune of his life was to throw it away, and to ignore the love of a good woman, based upon his preposterous sense of foreboding.

== Major themes ==
Marcher may appear so eccentric and unrealistic in his obsession that his fate could seem irrelevant and unconvincing. However, many critics and ordinary readers have found that his tragedy only dramatizes, with heightened effect, a common longing for an exalting experience that will redeem a humdrum existence, although most individuals will not endure anything like Marcher's final revelation at May's graveside.

The story has been read as a confession or parable about James' own life. He never married and possibly never experienced a consummated sexual relationship. Although he did enjoy a thorough experience of aesthetic creativity, it is possible that he still regretted what he called the "essential loneliness" of his life. This biographical relevance adds another level of meaning to "The Beast in the Jungle".

== Critical evaluation ==
James placed "The Beast in the Jungle" at the head of volume 17 of the New York Edition (1907–1909) of his fiction, along with another insightful examination of life and death, "The Altar of the Dead." Critics have almost unanimously agreed with the author's own high opinion of the tale, with some going so far as to put the story among the best short narratives in any literature.

Critics have appreciated James' flash of insight in conceiving "the man to whom nothing on earth was to have happened." They have also praised the tale's technique. Beginning in a neutral and rather diffident manner, the story builds to a climax of great power. Many critics have singled out the final paragraph for its intensity and rhetorical impact. In particular, the final sentence ends the tale with a succession of short (for James) but telling phrases:

The escape would have been to love her; then, then he would have lived. She had lived—who could say now with what passion?—since she had loved him for himself; whereas he had never thought of her (ah, how it hugely glared at him!) but in the chill of his egotism and the light of her use. Her spoken words came back to him, and the chain stretched and stretched. The beast had lurked indeed, and the beast, at its hour, had sprung; it had sprung in that twilight of the cold April when, pale, ill, wasted, but all beautiful, and perhaps even then recoverable, she had risen from her chair to stand before him and let him imaginably guess. It had sprung as he didn't guess; it had sprung as she hopelessly turned from him, and the mark, by the time he left her, had fallen where it was to fall. He had justified his fear and achieved his fate; he had failed, with the last exactitude, of all he was to fail of; and a moan now rose to his lips as he remembered she had prayed he mightn't know. This horror of waking—this was knowledge, knowledge under the breath of which the very tears in his eyes seemed to freeze. Through them, none the less, he tried to fix it and hold it; he kept it there before him so that he might feel the pain. That at least, belated and bitter, had something of the taste of life. But the bitterness suddenly sickened him, and it was as if, horribly, he saw, in the truth, in the cruelty of his image, what had been appointed and done. He saw the Jungle of his life and saw the lurking Beast; then, while he looked, perceived it, as by a stir of the air, rise, huge and hideous, for the leap that was to settle him. His eyes darkened—it was close; and, instinctively turning, in his hallucination, to avoid it, he flung himself, on his face, on the tomb.

== Appearances in other media ==
- The novel is directly referenced in the 1958 film The Screaming Skull, in which the protagonist experiencing her own sense of dread and foreboding discusses the novel's themes and plot.

== Adaptations ==
=== Film ===
- The novella was adapted into a film of the same name in 2017 by Brazilian directors Paulo Betti, Eliane Giardini and Lauro Escorel.
- The novella was adapted into a film of the same name in 2018 by Dutch director Clara van Gool.
- The novella was adapted into a film of the same name in 2023 by Austrian director Patric Chiha.
- The 2023 film The Beast by French director Bertrand Bonello was freely inspired by the novella.

=== Music ===
- The opera La Bête dans la jungle based on the novel and composed by Arnaud Petit was first performed at Oper Köln (opera of Cologne, Germany) on April 14, 2023.
