= A Home at the End of the World =

A Home at the End of the World may refer to:

- A Home at the End of the World (novel)
- A Home at the End of the World (film)
