= Restaldi =

Restaldi is a surname. Notable people with the surname include:

- Ari Renaldi, Indonesian music producer, composer, arranger, sound and mixing engineer, music director and musician
- Francesco Renaldi (1755–1798 or later), English-born painter
- Gerald Renaldi, 16th-century Irish Roman Catholic archdeacon
- Richard Renaldi (born 1968), American portrait photographer
