= Specimen Days =

Novel by Michael Cunningham

- First edition cover
- Author: Michael Cunningham
- Language: English
- Genre: Novel
- Publisher: Farrar Straus Giroux
- Publication date: June 2005
- Publication place: United States
- Media type: Print (Hardback & Paperback)
- Pages: 308 pp
- ISBN: 0-374-29962-5
- OCLC: 57531384
- Dewey Decimal: 813/.54 22
- LC Class: PS3553.U484 S64 2005

Specimen Days is a 2005 novel by American writer Michael Cunningham. It contains three stories: one that takes place in the past, one in the present, and one in the future. Each of the three stories depicts three central, semi-consistent character-types: a young boy, a man, and a woman. Walt Whitman's poetry is also a common thread in each of the three stories, and the title is from Whitman's own prose works.

The film rights to the book have been optioned by American movie producer Scott Rudin, who has turned Cunningham's previous novel The Hours into an Academy Award-winning movie.

== Premise ==
The novel is divided into what are essentially three discrete short stories, unified by common threads such as character names and types, story location (New York City), story themes (such as shared humanity), and the presence of Walt Whitman (whether through actual physical presence, quotation of his works via narrator or character, or the spirit of his ideas expressed through narrator or character).

The first short story, "In the Machine", is a ghost story. "In the Machine" takes place in New York City during the Industrial Revolution, as human beings confront the alienating realities of the new machine age. The principal characters are Lucas (a disfigured young boy), Catherine (a young woman who was to marry Lucas' elder brother), and Simon (Lucas' recently deceased elder brother).

The second short story, "The Children's Crusade", is a noir thriller. The story is set in early-21st-century New York City. The story plays with the conventions of the noir thriller as it tracks the pursuit of a terrorist band that is detonating bombs, seemingly at random, around the city. The principal characters are Cat (an African-American woman working in a New York City police department), Simon (Cat's businessman boyfriend), and Luke (a child terrorist).

The third short story, "Like Beauty", is futuristic science fiction. The story is set in a New York 150 years in the future. In the story, New York City is overwhelmed with refugees from the first inhabited planet to be contacted by the people of Earth. The principal characters are Simon (an adult male cyborg), Catareen (an adult female alien lizard living as a refugee on earth), and Luke (a homeless boy).

== Plot summary ==
=== "In the Machine" ===
"In the Machine", set in mid-to-late 19th Century New York, begins in the aftermath of a wake. Simon, a young man working in a factory had been accidentally sucked into a factory machine which crushed him to death. Due to the poverty present in the lower classes during the Industrial Revolution, Simon's family sends Lucas, Simon's disfigured younger brother, to work at the factory in Simon's place.

Lucas has a strange affliction in which he intermittently and uncontrollably spouts the poetry of Walt Whitman's 'Leaves of Grass' (Lucas' favourite book). Walt Whitman was a contemporary of the time and Lucas meets him during the course of the story. Lucas is also concerned Simon has become a ghost and inhabits not only the machine that killed him but all the machines that are becoming commonplace in the city as a result of the Industrial Revolution.

This concern leads Lucas to fear for the life of Catherine, Simon's bereaved girlfriend. Lucas believes Simon's ghost may try to inhabit the machines at the factory where Catherine works as a seamstress with a view to take Catherine to the afterlife by killing her through the machine's function. Lucas embarks on a mission to save Catherine by preventing her from going to work. .

Lucas' fear of Simon's ghost is, at the same time, a fear of the Machine and, on a larger scale, the Industrial Revolution in New York City itself. The machines replace humans, even kill them, and the industrial revolution has demeaned the importance of each human individual with its positioning of people as cogs in its own giant machine. In this light, Lucas' fears and Whitman's transcendental poetry represent the affirmation of humanity and each individual's importance.

== References and influence ==
Scissor Sisters's "The Other Side" from the album Ta-Dah is partially based on "In the Machine", the first third of Specimen Days. Michael Cunningham is a favorite writer of one of Scissor Sisters' lead singers, Jake Shears, and gave Shears an advance copy of Specimen Days. Shears wrote "The Other Side" right after reading it.

Hanya Yanagihara has said she considers her novel To Paradise to be "in conversation" with Specimen Days.

== Quotes ==
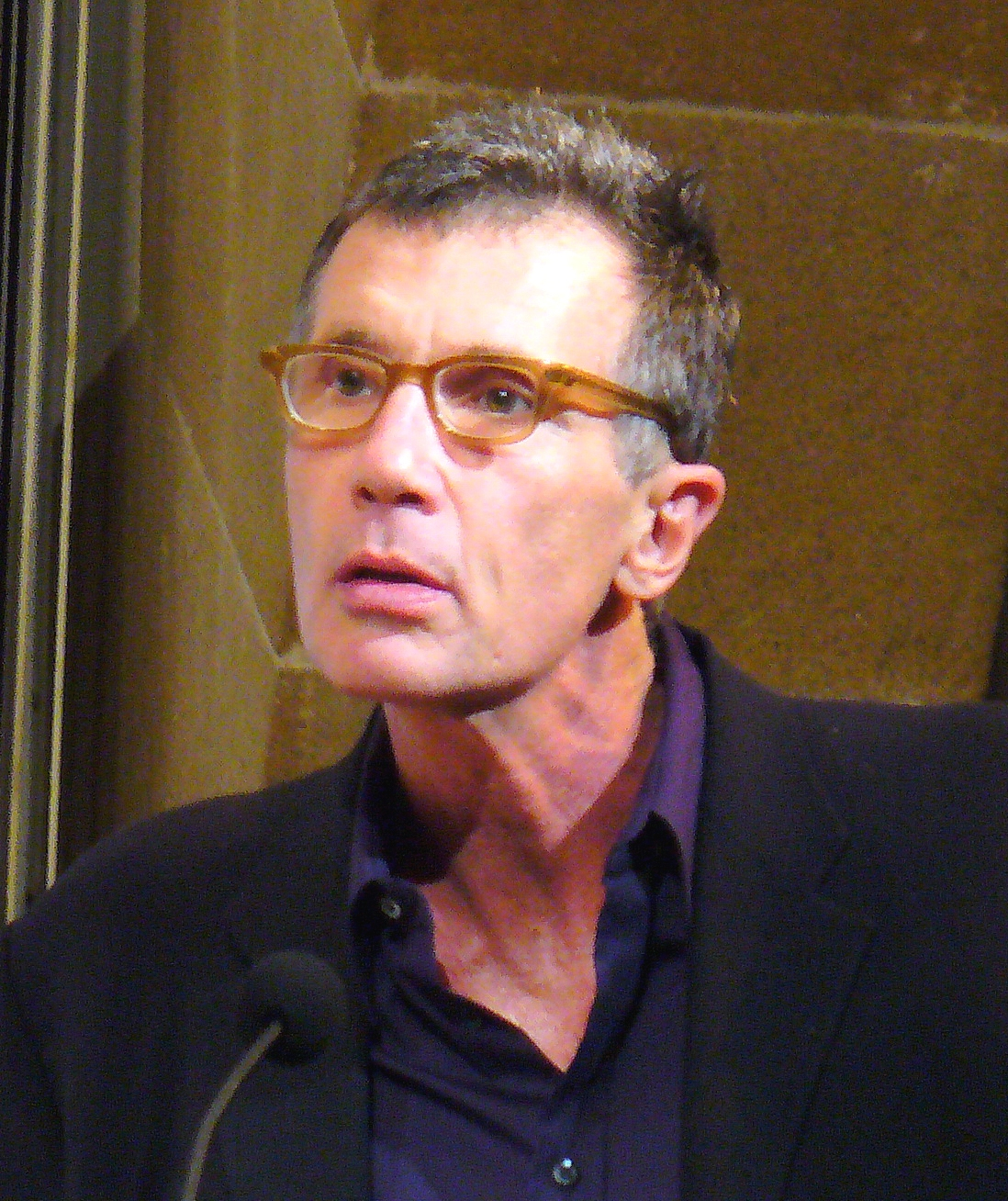
Author Michael Cunningham

- Fear not O Muse! truly new ways and days receive, surround you,

I candidly confess a queer, queer race, of novel fashion,
And yet the same old human race, the same within, without,
Faces and hearts the same, feelings the same, yearning the same,
The same old love, beauty and use the same.
—Walt Whitman
—Foreword, (vii, 1st paperback ed., 2005)
