= A Little Life =

2015 novel by Hanya Yanagihara

- Cover of the first U.S. edition
- Author: Hanya Yanagihara
- Cover artist: Peter Hujar (photo); Cardon Webb (design)
- Language: English
- Publisher: Doubleday
- Publication date: March 10, 2015
- Publication place: United States
- Pages: 814
- Awards: Kirkus Prize for Fiction
- ISBN: 0-385-53925-8
- Dewey Decimal: 813/.6
- LC Class: PS3625.A674 L58 2015

A Little Life is a 2015 novel by American writer Hanya Yanagihara. Lengthy and tackling difficult subject matter, it garnered critical acclaim, was shortlisted for the 2015 Man Booker Prize and the National Book Awards, and became a best seller.

Set primarily in New York City, the story chronicles the lives of four friends as they grapple with substance abuse, sexual assault and depression.

== Structure ==
A Little Life follows a chronological narrative with flashbacks frequently interspersed throughout. The novel's narrative perspectives shift throughout the story's progression. During the beginning of the novel, a third-person omniscient perspective privileging the thoughts of Jude, Willem, JB and Malcolm is employed. As the story gradually shifts its focus towards Jude, its perspective progressively molds entirely around each character's interactions with Jude and the experiences of Jude himself. This literary perspective is punctuated by first-person narratives told by an older Harold, nine years in the future.

The book is divided into seven parts:

1. Lispenard Street
2. The Postman
3. Vanities
4. The Axiom of Equality
5. The Happy Years
6. Dear Comrade
7. Lispenard Street

== Plot summary ==
The novel focuses on the lives of four friends: Jude St. Francis, a disabled genius with a mysterious past; Willem Ragnarsson, a kind, handsome man who aspires to be an actor; Malcolm Irvine, an architect working at a prestigious firm; and Jean-Baptiste "JB" Marion, a quick-witted painter who wants to make a name in the art world. The book follows their relationships changing under the influence of success, wealth, addiction, and pride.

The novel's main focus is the enigmatic lawyer, Jude. He lives with a damaged spine which leaves him with a limp and excruciating pain in his legs that comes and goes. Unbeknownst to his friends, he also frequently self-harms; one such bout of cutting led Willem to take him to Andy Contractor, Jude's doctor and trusted friend. It is clear that he suffers from debilitating mental trauma from his childhood.

Despite this apparent closeness with his friends, Jude finds himself unable to divulge details of his past or his current state of mind to them. Nonetheless, he thrives in his law practice, and develops a close parent-child relationship with his former professor, Harold, and his wife Julia, which results in the pair adopting him when Jude turns 30. While thankful, the time before the adoption is filled with further bouts of self-harm, as Jude believes he is inherently unworthy of affection. Meanwhile, the rest of the group finds success in their respective fields, with Willem becoming a star of theater and then film. JB finds success as an artist but also becomes addicted to crystal meth. The group stages an intervention, where JB mocks Jude by doing a crude imitation of his limp. In spite of successful treatment, and a great deal of apologizing, Jude finds it impossible to forgive JB. Willem refuses to forgive him too, causing the group to fragment, with only Malcolm remaining friends with all three of them.

It becomes clear that Jude was sexually traumatized at a very young age, making it difficult for him to engage in romantic relationships. His friends and loved ones begin questioning this isolation as he enters his forties, with Willem especially being baffled with regard to Jude's sexuality. As his loneliness grows more intense, he enters an abusive relationship with fashion executive Caleb, who is disgusted by Jude's limp and his increasing use of a wheelchair. Jude finally breaks off the relationship after Caleb rapes him, and they meet a final time when Caleb follows him to dinner with Harold, humiliates him, and then follows Jude to his apartment, where he brutally beats and rapes him, leaving him for dead. Jude nonetheless refuses to report the incident to the police, believing he deserved it. Besides Harold, only Andy – Jude's doctor and ongoing confidante – knows the truth of the failed relationship.

Although Jude's body manages to heal, the rape causes him to flash back to his childhood, wherein he was raised in a monastery and repeatedly sexually assaulted by the brothers. He recalls a period when one of the brothers, Brother Luke, ran away with him, forcing him into years of child prostitution. After he was rescued by the police, Jude was placed in state care, where the abuse continued at the hands of the counselors there. After the break-up with Caleb brings back this childhood trauma, Jude finally decides to kill himself but survives the attempt. In the aftermath, Willem comes back home and begins to live with him. Jude continues to refuse therapy but begins to tell Willem the least traumatic stories about his childhood, which Willem finds disturbing and horrifying. The two soon begin a relationship, but Jude continues to struggle with opening up, and does not enjoy having sex with him.

In an attempt to curb his cutting, Jude decides to instead burn himself as a form of self-harm, but accidentally inflicts third-degree burns that require a skin graft. The wound is so severe that Andy tells him he has to tell Willem what happened, or else he will do it for him. Before Jude can tell Willem, Andy accidentally divulges the information. Willem is horrified but, after a difficult fight, Jude finally confesses that he does not enjoy sex, and tells Willem about the years of sexual and physical abuse he endured. Jude also reveals that he escaped state care at age 14 and hitchhiked, performing sexual acts as payment to drivers. He also explains to Willem that the damage to his legs was caused by a man called Dr. Traylor, who picked Jude up and held him captive while he cured him of venereal disease, assaulted him, and eventually ran him over with his car.

The relationship continues, with Willem sleeping with women (and not with Jude). The two settle into a comfortable life together, which is shaken when Jude's legs become worse, and he must reluctantly amputate. He manages to learn to walk again with his new prosthetics, and the pair enter a period of their life which Willem dubs "The Happy Years". However, while picking up Malcolm and his wife from the train station for a visit, Willem is involved in a car crash with a drunk driver, which kills all three occupants. With his close friend and lover dead, Jude descends once again into self-destructive habits, losing such an excessive amount of weight that his remaining loved ones stage another intervention. Though they are able to get him to gain weight and to attend therapy, years of depression and despair finally overtake Jude, and he takes his own life.

== Themes ==
=== Male relationships ===
A core focus of the novel is the evolution of the relationships between Jude, Willem, JB, Malcolm and Jude's adoptive father, Harold. Jude's life in particular is populated by men who love and care about him, as well as men who exploit and abuse him, and those who fall in between the two categories. This is shown from the moment that he follows Brother Luke into the greenhouse, as well as the moments in which he knew what he was doing in the motel rooms was wrong, but still had felt dedication and love for Luke since up until those moments in his life, he was the only person who was kind to him. The social and emotional lives of each male character are the fabric that weaves the novel together, creating a narrative bubble that provides clues about the historical moment in which the story is situated.

=== Trauma, recovery, and support ===
In an article written for New York Magazine, Yanagihara states that "one of the things [she] wanted to do with this book was create a protagonist who never got better... [for him] to begin healthy (or appear so) and end sick – both the main character and the plot itself". The first 16 years of Jude's life, plagued by sexual, physical, and psychological abuse, continue to haunt him as he enters adulthood. His trauma directly affects his mental and physical health, relationships, beliefs, and the ways in which he navigates the world. He struggles to move beyond the damage the past has wrought upon his body and psyche.

Writing in The New Yorker, Parul Sehgal called Jude "one of the most accursed characters to ever darken a page". She went on,

The story is built on the care and service that Jude elicits from a circle of supporters who fight to protect him from his self-destructive ways; truly, there are newborns envious of the devotion he inspires. The loyalty can be mortifying for the reader, who is conscripted to join in, as a witness to Jude's unending mortifications. Can we so easily invest in this walking chalk outline, this vivified DSM entry? With the trauma plot, the logic goes: evoke the wound and we will believe that a body, a person, has borne it.

=== Self-harm and suicide ===
There is evident self-harm in the novel that is depicted in explicit details, with descriptions of how Jude does it and how he feels while doing so. Harold's realization is excruciatingly painful, more so than the news that Jude has indeed finally died by suicide. Harold's self-deception does not save him or Jude from pain; if anything, it adds to both their suffering. Yanagihara has stated that she does not believe in talk therapy, and that "every other medical specialty devoted to the care of the seriously ill recognizes that at some point, the doctor’s job is to help the patient die; that there are points at which death is preferable to life."

== Reception ==
=== Critical reception ===
A Little Life was met with very positive reviews from critics.

In The Atlantic, Garth Greenwell suggested that A Little Life is "the long-awaited gay novel…it engages with aesthetic modes long coded as queer: melodrama, sentimental fiction, and grand opera. By violating the canons of current literary taste, by embracing melodrama and exaggeration and sentiment, it can access emotional truth denied more modest means of expression."

The New Yorker's Jon Michaud found A Little Life to be "a surprisingly subversive novel – one that uses the middle-class trappings of naturalistic fiction to deliver an unsettling meditation on sexual abuse, suffering, and the difficulties of recovery." He praised Yanagihara's rendering of Jude's abuse, saying it "never feels excessive or sensationalist. It is not included for shock value or titillation, as is sometimes the case in works of horror or crime fiction. Jude's suffering is so extensively documented because it is the foundation of his character." He concluded that the book "can also drive you mad, consume you, and take over your life. Like the axiom of equality, A Little Life feels elemental, irreducible – and, dark and disturbing though it is, there is beauty in it."

In The Washington Post, Nicole Lee described Yanagihara's novel as "a witness to human suffering pushed to its limits, drawn in extraordinary detail by incantatory prose." She wrote that "through insightful detail and her decade-by-decade examination of these people's lives, Yanagihara has drawn a deeply realized character study that inspires as much as devastates. It's a life, just like everyone else's, but in Yanagihara's hands, it's also tender and large, affecting and transcendent; not a little life at all."

Jeff Chu of Vox wrote he would "give A Little Life all of the awards." He said that no book he previously read had "captured as perfectly the inner life of someone hoarding the unwanted souvenirs of early trauma – the silence, the self-loathing, the chronic and aching pain." He praised Yanagihara's prose to be "occasionally so stunning" that it would push him "back to the beginning of a paragraph for a second read." As he phrased it, "A Little Life may be the most beautiful, profoundly moving novel I've ever read. But I would never recommend it to anyone." Chu also said that Yanagihara's descriptions embodied his feelings, citing that "Jude's inability to address his wounds" compelled him to begin to address his own: "his struggle to find his peace emboldened me to try to find mine."

Writing in The Wall Street Journal, Sam Sacks called the story "an epic study of trauma and friendship, written with such intelligence and depth of perception that it will be one of the benchmarks against which all other novels that broach those subjects (and they are legion) will be measured." He said, "what's remarkable about this novel, and what sets it apart from so many books centered on damaged protagonists, is the poise and equanimity with which Ms. Yanagihara presents the most shocking aspects of Jude's life. There is empathy in the writing but no judgment, and Jude's suffering, though unfathomably extreme, is never used to extort a cheap emotional response."

Author Steph Cha writing for the Los Angeles Times remarked that "A Little Life is not misery porn; if that's what you're looking for, you will be disappointed, denied catharsis. There are truths here that are almost too much to bear – that hope is a qualified thing, that even love, no matter how pure and freely given, is not always enough. This book made me realize how merciful most fiction really is, even at its darkest, and it's a testament to Yanagihara's ability that she can take such ugly material and make it beautiful."

In John Powers's NPR Fresh Air review, he opined that A Little Life is "shot through with pain", but "far from being all dark"; in that it is "an unforgettable novel about the enduring grace of friendship." Similarly, in Bustle, Ilana Masad wrote that Yanagihara explored "just what the title implies[; …] the little bits of the little lives, so big when looked at close up, of four characters who live together in college and keep alive their friendship for decades after," and dubbed the novel "a remarkable feat, far from little in size, but worth every single page."

A notable negative opinion appeared in The New York Review of Books. Daniel Mendelsohn sharply critiqued A Little Life for its technical execution, its depictions of violence—which he found ethically and aesthetically gratuitous—and its position with respect to the representation of queer life or issues by a presumed-heterosexual author. Mendelsohn's review prompted a response from Gerald Howard, the book's editor, taking issue not with Mendelsohn's dislike of the novel but "his implication that my author has somehow, to use his word, 'duped' readers into feeling the emotions of pity and terror and sadness and compassion."

Christian Lorentzen, writing in the London Review of Books, referred to the characters as "stereotypical middle-class strivers plucked out of 1950s cinema." The New York Times book reviewer Janet Maslin also wrote critically of the novel, saying Yanagihara introduces "great shock value into her story to override its predictability." Andrea Long Chu of New York criticized "the masochism [of the book] and its authorial intent" in writing "[r]eading A Little Life, one can get the impression that Yanagihara is somewhere high above with a magnifying glass, burning her beautiful boys like ants." Chu later received the Pulitzer Prize for Criticism in 2023 for her article.

Some critics situate the book within the broader cultural trend of trauma-focused literature that gained prominence in the early 2000s, alongside the commercial success of misery literature depicting extreme abuse, neglect, and suffering. In her 2021 essay The Case Against the Trauma Plot, published in The New Yorker, Parul Sehgal positions the novel as a prominent example of contemporary trauma fiction, arguing that its emphasis on the protagonist's traumatic past risks reducing character development to a series of psychological wounds and turning suffering into the principal driver of the narrative.

Yanagihara appeared on Late Night with Seth Meyers in July 2015 to discuss the book. In 2019, the novel was ranked 96th on The Guardian's list of the 100 best books of the 21st century. In a 2022 review of A Little Life's theatrical adaptation, Naveen Kumar of The New York Times stated that the novel's reputation "has since become more divisive".

In 2025, A Little Life along with Yanagihara's subsequent novel, To Paradise, were banned from distribution in Belarus citing potential harm to national interests.

=== Awards ===
In July 2015, the novel was longlisted for the Man Booker Prize and made the shortlist of six books in September 2015.

Year	Award	Category	Result	Ref.
2015	Kirkus Prize	Fiction	Won	
2015	Man Booker Prize	—	Shortlisted	
2015	National Book Award	Fiction	Shortlisted	
2016	Andrew Carnegie Medal for Excellence	Fiction	Shortlisted	
2016	Women's Prize for Fiction	—	Shortlisted	
2017	International Dublin Literary Award	—	Shortlisted	

== Adaptations ==
The theatre company Toneelgroep Amsterdam debuted Koen Tachelet's adaptation of A Little Life on 23 September 2018 in Amsterdam, Netherlands. Ivo van Hove directed the adaptation, which had a run time of over four hours. Van Hove collaborated with Yanagihara on the script after being given copies of the novel by two friends. Ramsey Nasr played the lead Jude St. Francis in the adaptation, which received generally positive reviews. Theatre critic Matt Trueman wrote that, despite the play's sometime suffocating trauma and violence, it "is van Hove at his best, theatre that leaves an ineradicable mark". The Dutch-language production with English subtitles was shown at the 2022 Edinburgh International Festival, in October 2022 at the Brooklyn Academy of Music, and in March 2023 at the Adelaide Festival.

In August 2020, the theatre company Liver & Lung presented an unofficial musical adaptation of A Little Life in Kuala Lumpur, Malaysia. Seven songs from the album were released on Spotify on 7 January 2022, to celebrate the release of Yanagihara's new novel, To Paradise.

An English-language version of Tachelet's stage adaptation premiered on 14 March 2023 at the Richmond Theatre in South West London, followed by a West End run at the Harold Pinter Theatre and the Savoy Theatre. James Norton played Jude St. Francis and while the play received mixed reviews, Norton received widespread acclaim for his performance and an Olivier Award nomination. A recording of the adaptation was filmed at the Savoy Theatre, and received a limited cinematic release on 28 September 2023.
