= To Paradise =

2022 novel by Hanya Yanagihara

- Cover of the first U.S. edition
- Author: Hanya Yanagihara
- Language: English
- Publisher: Doubleday
- Publication date: January 11, 2022
- Publication place: United States
- Pages: 720
- ISBN: 0-385-54793-5
- OCLC: 11199140637
- Dewey Decimal: 813/.6
- LC Class: 2021943460

To Paradise is a 2022 novel by American novelist Hanya Yanagihara. The book, Yanagihara's third, takes place in an alternate version of New York City, and has three sections, respectively set in 1893, 1993, and 2093. Though a bestseller, the novel received mixed reviews from critics.

== Plot ==
=== Washington Square ===
In 1893 David Bingham is the 27-year-old high-strung grandson of Nathaniel Bingham, a founder of the Free States. The Free States permit same-sex marriage, white women have the right to education and can vote, but the Free States deny Black people citizenship.

David worries about remaining a bachelor all his life. He is introduced to Charles Griffiths, a middle-aged tradesman, in the hope they will marry. Around the same time, David meets a piano teacher at the school where he volunteers, Edward Bishop. David is immediately attracted to Edward and begins to seek him out. The two quickly enter into a love affair though it is broken off when Edward returns home. During Edward's absence, David allows himself to be courted by Charles, engaging in a sexual relationship with him. However, when Edward returns with poor excuses for his absence, David abruptly cuts Charles off.

Edward suggests that David run away with him to California, where homosexuality is illegal but where he has the prospect of running a silk farm. David agrees, but when he confesses to his grandfather, his grandfather reveals that he has had Edward investigated and found he is a conman and thief who has seduced wealthy men. Nevertheless, David decides to turn his back on his family and his grandfather disowns him.

=== Lipo-Wao-Nahele ===
In 1993 David Bingham is a 25-year-old paralegal descended from Hawaiian royalty who has chosen to turn his back on his heritage and lives in New York City with Charles Griffiths, a wealthy older lawyer. The two are deeply affected by the HIV/AIDS pandemic, with Charles being a dormant carrier and many of his friends dying.

David keeps his heritage a secret from Charles. In an extended flashback David's father, also named David and now in confinement at a care home, reflects on his lonely childhood as the heir to a broken dynasty and how his friend Edward encouraged him to join the Hawaiian independence movement believing that they could one day restore the monarchy, to the detriment of his relationship with his son and his own mother. Encouraged by Edward, the older David eventually moves to Lipo-Wao-Nahele, a worthless piece of land he owns through his grandfather though they are neither able to develop the land nor motivate any followers.

=== Zone Eight ===
In 2093 after a series of pandemics, America has descended into a fascistic state. Charlie Griffiths, a childhood survivor of one pandemic, has been left physically scarred from the disease and suffers from an emotional impairment from the medicine taken to survive it.

In letters to his British friend Peter, Charlie's grandfather Charles Griffiths details his move to the U.S. from Hawaii, the devolution of his marriage, and his increasingly unhappy relationship with his son as well as tracking his career from an influential scientist to later influential statesman to eventual victim of the state.

== Writing and development ==
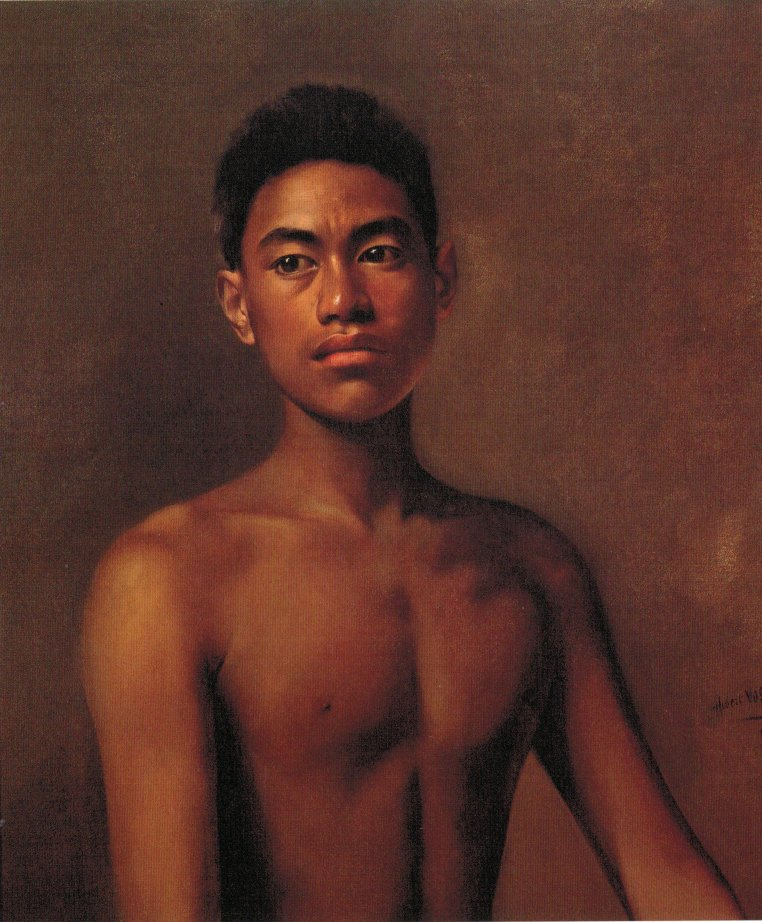
The original I'okepa, Hawaiian Fisher Boy

Yanagihara began writing the book in 2016, after a conversation with her friend Jared Hohlt about the Henry James novel Washington Square. Hohlt and Yanagihara discussed how the novel would change if it were re-imagined to feature same-sex marriage. Yanagihara found Washington Square appealing due to its depiction of the contentious relationship between a father and daughter, and characterizes the father, Sloper, as "one of James's most honest characters". After the conversation with Hohlt, Yanagihara began writing a work set in an alternate reality in which same-sex marriage was made legal in New York in the eighteenth century.

Before beginning to write the piece inspired by Washington Square, Yanagihara had begun writing two other stories, respectively set in a time near the present and in a dystopian future. American novelist Michael Cunningham served as an influence on To Paradise, both through conversations with Yanagihara and through her interest in his work. Cunningham's novel Specimen Days has a three-act structure set in the past, present, and future of New York City, and Yanagihara has said that To Paradise is "to some extent in conversation with" Specimen Days. To combine the three stories she had developed into a single novel, Yanagihara set each in the same townhouse adjacent Washington Square Park.

Though the final portion of the book takes place in a future version of New York City in which climate change and pandemics have devastated the city, Yanagihara had written most of the novel before the coronavirus pandemic began. Pandemics feature prominently in the novel, as Yanagihara is "interested in disease". To guarantee the pandemic in the portion of To Paradise set in the future was accurate, she spoke with virologists at Rockefeller University, and the book was read by David Morens of the National Institutes of Health.

Yanagihara wrote the novel intending to challenge the reader's conceptions of the United States, and to leave citizens of the country with "more questions than they had going in".

=== Publication ===
Yanagihara sold the book to publisher Doubleday in April 2021. Doubleday paid more than US$1 million for the rights to publish the novel. Through New York outlet The Cut, Yanagihara, soon after the sale, revealed some details about the book's contents, including its three-part structure. Yanagihara revealed the novel's cover on Instagram in August 2021. The cover incorporates the 1898 painting I'okepa, Hawaiian Fisher Boy by Dutch painter Hubert Vos, and was created by designer Na Kim.

== Reception ==
=== Critical reception ===
To Paradise received mixed reviews. Two critics praised the book as "ambitious". Gish Jen, in The New York Times, wrote that the novel "[tackled] major American questions and [answered] them in an original, engrossing way". Maggie Doherty qualified her praise for the book's ambition, writing that despite Yanagihara's goals, the novel was nevertheless her "least successful".

In a negative review written for The Wall Street Journal, Sam Sacks contrasted To Paradise with Yanagihara's second book, writing that, despite being "as big and grueling and terror-strewn as its predecessor", To Paradise "is strangely lifeless". Sacks further remarked that, unlike A Little Life, To Paradise is "boring". He also questioned the role of including an alternative history of same-sex marriage in the United States, referring to it as "just randomly switching stuff around". Sacks compared the presence and purpose of the speculative history unfavorably to explorations of gender, sexuality, and related themes in other works – including The Left Hand of Darkness and The Sparsholt Affair.

=== Sales ===
The novel was the top-selling newly released hardcover book the week ending January 15, 2022, with 16,000 copies sold. The novel was the top-selling hardcover fiction book on The New York Times best seller list the week of January 23, 2022.

=== Accolades ===
Claire Allfree included To Paradise in an article, published in The Telegraph, discussing the best fiction of 2022. Allfree praised the novel as "wildly ambitious" and "shapeshifting".
