= The People in the Trees =

2013 novel by Hanya Yanagihara

- Cover of the first U.S. edition
- Author: Hanya Yanagihara
- Language: English
- Publisher: Doubleday
- Publication date: August 13, 2013
- Publication place: United States
- Pages: 362
- ISBN: 0-34580331-0
- OCLC: 1376226215
- Dewey Decimal: 813/.6
- LC Class: PS3625.A674 P46 2013

The People in the Trees is the 2013 debut novel of author Hanya Yanagihara. Yanagihara stated that her book was in part inspired by Daniel Carleton Gajdusek, who was revered in the scientific community before being convicted of child molestation.

The bulk of the novel is made up of the fictional memoirs of Dr. Abraham Norton Perina, a scientific researcher who discovers a turtle with life-prolonging qualities on the fictional island of Ivu'ivu.

Yanagihara based the physical look and shape of Ivu'ivu on Angra dos Reis. The book received critical acclaim.

== Plot ==
In the late 1990s, Dr. Ronald Kubodera, a colleague of Nobel Laureate Dr. Abraham Norton Perina, mourns Norton's downfall after being convicted of sexually abusing his own children. Kubodera encourages Norton to write his memoirs from his prison isolation, and marks them with footnotes.

Norton writes of his childhood in the small town of Lindon, Indiana, where his interest in science was piqued by his paternal aunt Sybil, a doctor. While attending medical school, Norton attracts the attention of Gregory Smythe, and is hired to work in his lab. Norton is eventually invited to Smythe's home for dinner, where Smythe cries in front of him. Repulsed by Smythe, Norton quits the lab. Shortly before graduation, however, Norton is approached to be the medical doctor on an anthropological mission to U'ivu, led by a man named Paul Tallent. Norton realizes that Smythe recommended him in order to send him as far away as possible from him. Despite the fact that the mission is considered career suicide, Norton accepts.

Norton meets Tallent for the first time before they leave from Hawaii to U'ivu, and finds him beautiful and enigmatic. When they arrive in U'ivu, they meet the other member of the team, a woman named Esme Duff, whom Norton immediately dislikes. Tallent leads Norton and Duff to a smaller island that is part of U'ivu, called Ivu'ivu. There they meet three hunter guides, who lead them deep into the jungle of the island, where eventually Tallent reveals to Norton that there is a legend among the U'ivu people about a lost tribe that has been gifted with eternal life but also deep stupidity, and that their guides have actually seen one of these people. Shortly after, they discover a woman who is devoid of language, completely nude and seemingly unable to function as a regular human being. The explorers dub the woman Eve, and quickly discover a tribe of other people like her – whom they dub "Dreamers" – all of whom have varyingly poor grasp of language. Through some of the more lucid dreamers, Tallent discovers that, though they all have a mark of a turtle on them, indicating that they are 60, they are actually all well over 100 years old.

Shortly after discovering the Dreamers, the explorers also discover a group of Ivu'ivu's who had lost contact with the U'ivuians. They are allowed to observe the village, as long as they do not bring the Dreamers in contact with them. While there, Norton observes the villagers engaging in the ritualistic rape of a ten-year-old boy. While Duff finds the ritual disturbing, Norton decides that it is not rape or abuse but simply a cultural difference. Later on, he has a sexual encounter with the boy who was raped, which he claims is consensual.

He and the group also observe the chief of the village engaging in a ritual to celebrate his 60th year, where he eats a turtle. Norton quickly realizes that there is a link between eating the turtle, the seeming immortality, and the brain damage exhibited by the dreamers. After interviewing one of the dreamers, he is taken to a small pond where the turtles come from, and later, against Tallent's advice, he returns and kills one of the turtles to bring back its flesh for experiments in America. He and Tallent also bring back four of the Dreamers for further observation.

Back in America, working at Stanford, Norton feeds the turtle to mice, and realizes that their life cycle can be extended six times that of regular mice. He publishes his paper, at first to derision and, eventually, to acclaim. Tallent warns him that his paper has condemned the people of U'ivu, and this eventually proves true: the turtles of Ivu'ivu are eventually hunted to extinction by pharmaceutical companies, and the island itself is destroyed. Eventually, U'ivu is colonized as well. Norton continues to visit the island, and begins to adopt local abandoned children in great numbers. In 1980, he sees a decrepit man he believes was the boy he had the sexual encounter with when he first came to Ivu'ivu, who foists his son on Norton. Norton takes the boy home and names him Victor.

As Victor grows older, he and Norton develop an increasingly contentious relationship. Norton claims that, on Christmas, Victor locked Norton out of his home, leaving him to die, after which Norton locks Victor in the basement for a few days. When Victor is a teenager, he goes to Norton's brother, Owen, and tells him that Norton raped him, causing a rift between the brothers, and leading to Norton's imprisonment.

In December 2000, Dr. Kubodera writes that he and Norton have escaped from his parole officer. He confesses to feeling guilty for having omitted a portion of Norton's memoirs, and includes it as a post-script. The omitted portion reveals that Norton raped not only Victor but many of his other adopted sons.

== Reception ==
The People in the Trees received positive reviews. The New York Times called her "a writer to marvel at", while The Guardian called the book an "ambitious debut". A review in The Independent called the novel "an absorbing, intelligent and uncompromising novel, which beguiles and unnerves".
