= By Nightfall =

2010 novel by American author Michael Cunningham

- First Edition cover
- Author: Michael Cunningham
- Language: English
- Publisher: Farrar, Straus and Giroux
- Publication date: October 2010
- Publication place: United States
- Pages: 256 pp
- ISBN: 978-0-374-29908-8

By Nightfall is the sixth novel by Pulitzer Prize winning American author Michael Cunningham.

== Plot ==
Peter and his wife, Rebecca—who edits a mid-level art magazine—have settled into a comfortable life in Manhattan's art world, but their staid existence is disrupted by the arrival of Rebecca's much younger brother, Ethan—known as Mizzy, short for "The Mistake." Family golden child Mizzy is a recovering drug addict whose current whim has landed him in New York where he wants to pursue a career in "the arts." Watching Mizzy—whose resemblance to a younger Rebecca unnerves Peter—coast through life without responsibilities makes Peter question his own choices and wonder if it's more than Mizzy's freedom that he covets.
