= Washington Square (novel) =

1880 novel by Henry James

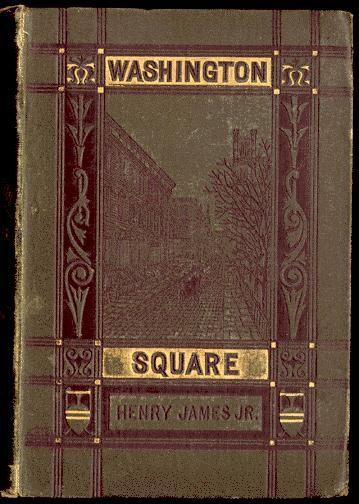
- 1880 first edition cover
- Author: Henry James
- Illustrator: George du Maurier
- Language: English
- Genre: Romance
- Publisher: Harper & Brothers; New York City
- Publication date: 1 December 1880
- Publication place: United States
- Media type: Print: hardcover
- Pages: 266 pp
- OCLC: 9746895
- Dewey Decimal: 813.4
- Preceded by: Confidence
- Followed by: The Portrait of a Lady
- Text: Washington Square at Wikisource

Washington Square is a novel written and published in 1880 by Henry James about Dr. Austin Sloper's attempts to thwart a romance between his naïve daughter Catherine and Morris Townsend, the man he believes wishes to marry her for her money. The novel was adapted into a play, The Heiress, which in turn became an Academy Award-winning film starring Olivia de Havilland in the title role.

== Background ==
The plot of the novel is based upon a story told to James by his close friend, British actress Fanny Kemble. An 1879 entry in James' notebooks details an incident where Kemble told James about her brother, who romantically pursued "a dull, commonplace girl...who had a very handsome private fortune."

== Plot summary ==
In 1840s to 1850s New York City, the conventional, plain, shy, naïve, and introverted 22-year-old Catherine Sloper lives with her highly respected and wealthy physician father, Dr. Austin Sloper, in Washington Square, a then newly-established neighborhood near Greenwich Village. After the deaths of his wife and infant son, Dr. Sloper lives with Catherine with his widowed sister, Mrs. Penniman, who effectively converts her temporary residence into a permanent arrangement and in effect comes to be charged with Catherine's education. Although never disclosed directly to Catherine, Doctor Sloper does not hold his daughter's quiet, reserved personality or plain appearance in high regard, finding these a disappointing contrast with her deceased mother. Catherine is not particularly socially gifted nor possessed of much sense in fashion (a situation not helped by her father's rather parsimonious attitude towards her).

Catherine's cousin Marian gets engaged to a man named Arthur Townsend. At the engagement party, Marian introduces Catherine to Arthur's cousin Morris Townsend, who flirts with her throughout the party, the first time a man has paid her any attention. Catherine is smitten with the attractive and charming Morris, who has wasted his own relatively modest inheritance on wild living and is now impecunious, but claims to be a changed man. Morris is aware that Catherine has an inheritance from her mother and will presumably inherit a greater fortune from her father.

Highly skeptical of Townsend's motivations, Dr. Sloper has him to dinner in the Washington Square home and, relying on his own judgment, decides that Morris cannot be trusted and is really only interested in Catherine's inheritance. His suspicions of Townsend's mercenary motivations are confirmed when he seeks out an interview with Townsend's sister, a woman of modest means but considerable integrity off of whom Townsend is sponging, and who advises, contrary to her own interests, against Catherine marrying her brother.

Despite her father's demand that she end the relationship, Catherine continues to entertain Townsend. Mrs. Penniman, a romantic busybody, invests herself in their relationship as well, taking Townsend's side. When Catherine discloses to Dr. Sloper that they are engaged, the doctor makes plain that any such marriage will result in her exclusion from his will, and reinforces this message by treating his loving and sensitive daughter with deliberate and extraordinary coldness in an attempt to bend her to his will.

Sloper takes his daughter to Europe for a year, hoping she will forget the now somewhat-vacillating Townsend, who, in contrast, hopes Catherine will win her father to his cause during the trip. Aunt Penniman invites Townsend to visit the Sloper home often in their absence, as later discovered by Dr. Sloper through his depleted wine collection. She forwards letters from Townsend in her own letters to her niece. While Dr. Sloper and Catherine are in Switzerland, Dr. Sloper, after several months of declining to discuss Townsend, confronts Catherine angrily over her refusal to renounce Townsend in a way that momentarily leaves her feeling physically threatened. She, however, resolutely refuses to back down, upsetting Sloper with her disobedience.

Once the Slopers arrive back in New York, a calculating Townsend, now unwilling to go through with the marriage in the clear knowledge that Dr. Sloper will disinherit his daughter, breaks off the engagement, indifferent to the pain he is causing Catherine and rationalizing it to the meddling Mrs. Penniman, whom he secretly holds in contempt, that without her full inheritance Catherine will be at a disadvantage.

Deeply wounded by Townsend's desertion and with her relationship with her father badly damaged, Catherine, who finds herself with no-one in whom she can confide her trauma, continues her life at their home in Washington Square with her father and aunt. Although she is courted by two suitors, at least one of whom is very much in love with her and has her father's approval, she refuses both and cultivates a life of her own that includes charity work and caring for her aging father, and never marries. Eventually, Dr. Sloper, in whom Catherine has not confided, demands of Catherine that she will not marry Townsend after his death. Although she has no contact with Townsend and no intention of ever marrying him, she refuses to be forced by her father into making any such commitment. We later discover that her father, whom she subsequently nurses at his demand on his deathbed, has responded to her refusal by cutting her inheritance to a mere fifth of what it otherwise would have been, accompanying this decision with some cutting wording in a codicil to his will. Catherine, although not pleased with the wording, accepts the reduction in her inheritance without any resentment, living as she has been in any case well within the means willed to her by her deceased mother.

After Dr. Sloper's death, Aunt Penniman orchestrates, without permission, a meeting between Catherine and the now middle-aged but still handsome Morris, who has reappeared in New York, having enjoyed little financial success in life and having married in Europe and been widowed. Surprised and dismayed by his unwanted reappearance in her life, which is informed by his knowledge that she has inherited from her father, even if not as much as he expected, she decisively rebuffs Townsend's attempt to re-establish any relationship between them or presence in her life, and continues her unmarried life.

== List of characters ==
- Dr. Austin Sloper - Prestigious, highly respected American physician.
- Catherine Sloper - Austin's wife, née Catherine Harrington.
- Catherine Sloper, Ms. - Austin and Catherine's 22-year-old daughter.
- Lavinia Penniman - Austin's sister.
- Elizabeth Almond - Austin's sister.
- Jefferson Almond - Elizabeth's husband, a prosperous merchant.
- Marian Almond - Jefferson and Elizabeth's daughter.
- Morris Townsend - Ms. Catherine's fiancé, abhorred by Austin.
- Arthur Townsend - Morris' cousin, Marian's fiancé.
- Mrs. Montgomery - Morris' widow sister.

== Literary significance and criticism ==
James himself did not think highly of the novel. He described it as "poorish" and said, "The only good thing in the story is the girl." The literary scholar Edward Wagenknecht noted that the novel "has certainly attracted more favorable attention." The poet and critic Donald Hall wrote, "Everybody likes Washington Square, even the denigrators of Henry James".

== Adaptations ==
Ruth and Augustus Goetz adapted the novel for the stage as The Heiress, originally performed on Broadway in 1947 with Wendy Hiller as Catherine and Basil Rathbone as Dr. Sloper, and revived a number of times since. The play was adapted for film in 1949, and starred Olivia de Havilland as Catherine, Ralph Richardson as Dr. Sloper, and Montgomery Clift as Morris. William Wyler directed. It was nominated for eight Academy Awards and won four.

In 1972, Mexican director Jose Luis Ibañez made a movie version of this novel titled Victoria (based on his own adaptation with Jorge Font) and starring Julissa, Enrique Alvarez Félix, Guillermo Murray and Rita Macedo. This adaptation takes place in modern day Mexico City and takes liberties with the original text.

Rudolf Nureyev choreographed a full length ballet based on the novel and set to the music of Charles Ives for the Paris Opera Ballet in 1985. The time period was updated to the early 1900s.

In 1992, Filipino director Carlos Siguion-Reyna directed a film adaptation titled Ikaw Pa Lang ang Minahal (Only You). It starred Maricel Soriano as Adela (Catherine), Richard Gomez as David Javier (Morris Townsend), Eddie Gutierrez as Dr. Sevilla (Dr. Sloper) and Charito Solis as Tia Paula (Aunt Lavinia). The screenplay was written by Raquel Villavicencio.

Polish director Agnieszka Holland made Washington Square in 1997, starring Jennifer Jason Leigh, Albert Finney, and Ben Chaplin, with Maggie Smith as Mrs. Penniman.

The novel was adapted as an opera by Thomas Pasatieri in 1976.

In 2013, playwright John W. Lowell published a modern gay adaptation called Sheridan Square.

American author Hanya Yanagihara's 2022 novel To Paradise was heavily influenced by Washington Square with the first section taking its title from the novel and loosely following the same setup though re-imagined in an 1890s New York where same-sex marriage is legal.
