= John W. Lowell =

American playwright (born 1962)

- Born: September 9, 1962 (age 63); Smithtown, New York
- Occupation: playwright

John W. Lowell is an American playwright. He lives in the West Village in New York City.

== Education ==
Lowell earned a B.A. in history from Tufts University in Medford, Massachusetts. Additionally, he studied musical theory with Mark DeVoto and musical composition with T.J. Anderson.

== Playwright ==
=== The Letters ===
The Letters is Lowell's most frequently performed work. Exploring themes of censorship, torture, office politics, "...the playwright has said that an inspiration for his play was the impeachment... of President Bill Clinton. The government’s intrusion into private lives infuriated Lowell. In 2004, the U.S.’s torture of prisoners and later, Edward Snowden’s revelations, continued to fuel the subtext of political commentary in the drama. The Letters explores how governments manipulate the truth and use fear and mistrust as psychological controls."

The play is a fictional account of the efforts by the Soviets to censor and suppress the private papers of composer Pyotr Ilyich Tchaikovsky.

==== Productions ====
The Letters was premiered in Los Angeles by the Andak Stage Company on March 14, 2009, and has received subsequent productions by the Writers' Theatre (Glencoe, IL), the Aurora Theatre Company (Berkeley, CA), the Cardinal Stage Company (Bloomington, IN), and MetroStage (Alexandria VA), among others.

==== Critical reception ====
A Time review of a 2012 Writers' Theatre production in Chicago said, "[The Letters] conveys a sense of abstract menace reminiscent of Pinter or Mamet Yet the menace has a specific source, and the play has a concrete sense of time and place... a nearly perfect evening of theater..."

=== Other dramatic works ===
- Autumn Canticle: The play is loosely based on the relationship between Benjamin Britten and Peter Pears. After a developmental production with the Eureka Theatre of San Francisco, the play premiered in 1997 at the Walnut Street Theater in Philadelphia directed by David Ogden Stiers, and was subsequently produced by the Celebration Theatre Los Angeles.
- Drawing Fire: When an American cartoonist becomes the target of assassins, he and his ex-wife wrestle with the concept of free expression in a world where it can cost a person literally everything.
- The Genius Of The System: Why is it that when three ambitious men work together, they can never quite work together?
- The Great Purim Adventure Of Chip Malibu: One son is everything a parent could wish for; the other is a porn star: family gatherings can be such fun! It had a reading in 2004 at the Queens Theatre in the Park directed by Rob Urbinati.
- Leo Tolstoy Is In The Next Room Dying: : When the most famous man in the world arrives at a railway station to die, a prudent station master's wife recognizes the profundity of the moment, and will charge a kopeck and a leg for others to share the moment. It premiered in 1997 at the San Jose Stage Company, San Jose, CA
- Rensselaer: A Jewish family comes to grips with the failures and disappointments of an American dream that did not and could not come true.
- Sheridan Square: a modern "gay" adaptation of the Henry James novel Washington Square.
- The Standby Lear: What happens when the last great opportunity in an actor's life arrives, and the actor realizes that his moment may have already passed?
- Taken In: A middle-aged man tries to save a teenage hustler, but who is really saving whom? It premiered in 2001 produced by The Richmond Triangle Players, and has since been in London and Santa Cruz, and Lima, Peru.
- Two Women In A Garden (Two one-act plays): CHARLOTTE AND OLIVIA: The plight of a brilliant 19th century woman trapped in a world dominated by men; ANGELA AND GRACE: A cook-out at a Long Island home devolves into a mini-Armageddon.

== Other theatrical projects and activities ==
Lowell composed music for Mikhail Kuzmin's The Dangerous Precaution for Theatre Rhinoceros in 2008.

Lowell worked as a dramaturg on Frank Loesser’s Señor Discretion Himself, premiered at Arena Stage and Pleasures And Palaces for which he reconstructed the script and score, and also adapted Charles Dickens's A Christmas Carol for performance by David Ogden Stiers.

He has also been an archivist, historian, editor, rehearsal pianist, musical director, house manager, and Broadway music copyist. He also spent five years employing his musical and literary skills working for both Frank Loesser Enterprises and Jule Styne Enterprises, as well as being was head of materials at Music Theatre International and was the first materials' manager of Theatrical Rights Worldwide.

And under the editorship of Dr. Fred Hammond, Lowell did the first complete typesetting of Alessandro Scarlatti's opera Il Pompeo.

== Awards ==
Autumn Canticle was nominated for a 2004 G.L.A.A.D. Media Award in the Music & Theater category for Outstanding Play in Los Angeles.

He was also nominated Best Playwright by both the 2009 Los Angeles Stage Alliance's Ovation Award and the 2010 Garland award both for the Andak Stage production of The Letters.
