= Michael Cunningham =

American novelist and screenwriter

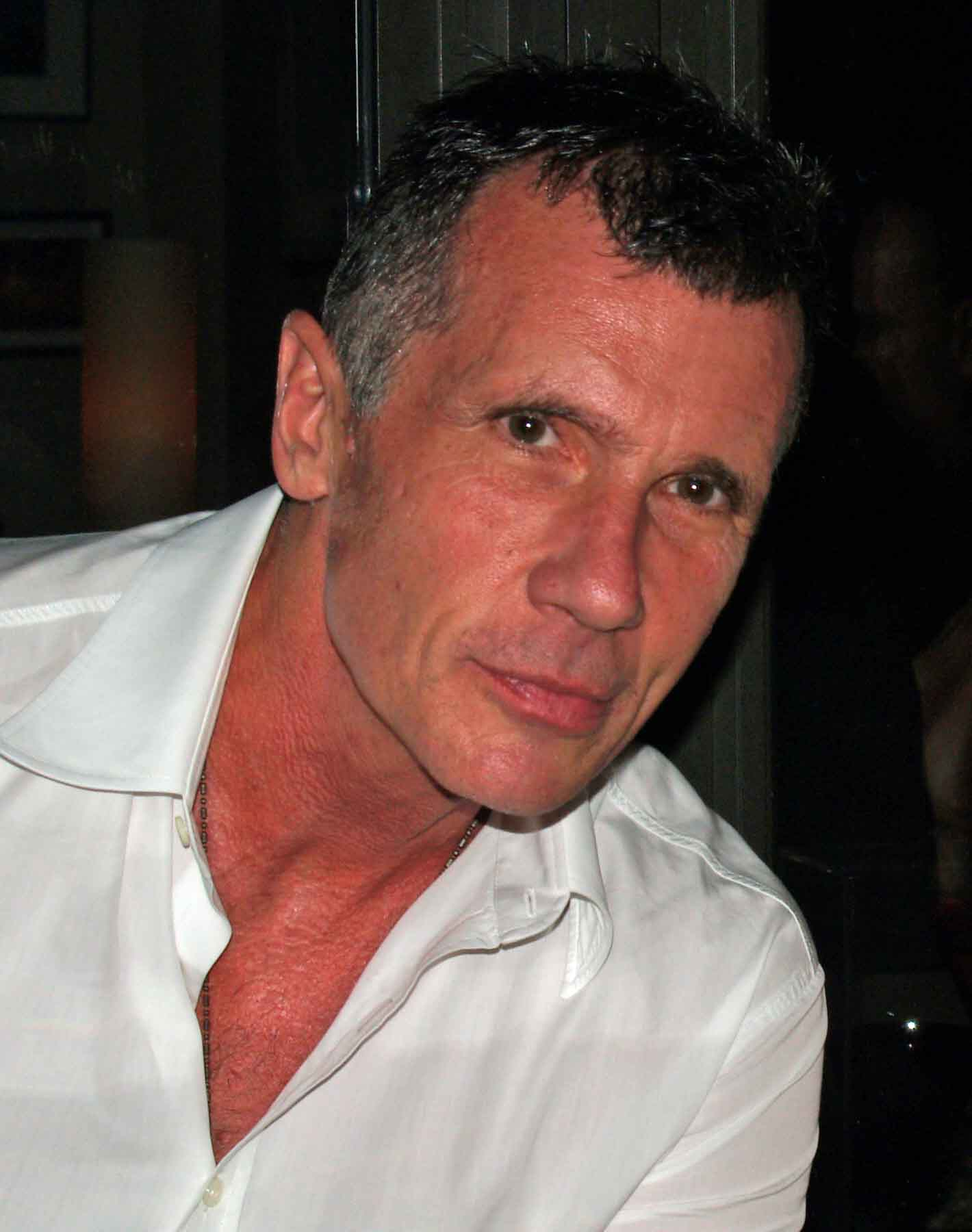
- Born: November 6, 1952 (age 74); Cincinnati, Ohio, U.S.
- Education: Stanford University (BA); University of Iowa (MFA)
- Occupations: Author; screenwriter; Professor in the Practice of creative writing at Yale University
- Writing career
- Notable work: The Hours
- Notable awards: Pulitzer Prize for Fiction; PEN/Faulkner Award

Michael Cunningham (born November 6, 1952) is an American novelist and screenwriter. He is best known for his 1998 novel The Hours, which won the Pulitzer Prize for Fiction and the PEN/Faulkner Award in 1999. Cunningham is Professor in the Practice of Creative Writing at Yale University.

== Early life and education ==
Cunningham was born in Cincinnati, Ohio, and grew up in La Cañada Flintridge, California. He studied English literature at Stanford University, where he earned his degree. Later, at the University of Iowa, he received a Michener Fellowship and was awarded a Master of Fine Arts degree from the Iowa Writers' Workshop. While studying at Iowa, he had short stories published in Atlantic Monthly and The Paris Review. His short story "White Angel" was later used as a chapter in his novel A Home at the End of the World and was included in The Best American Short Stories 1989, published by Houghton Mifflin.

In 1988, Cunningham received a National Endowment for the Arts Fellowship and in 1993 a Guggenheim Fellowship. In 1995 he was awarded a Whiting Award. Cunningham has taught at the Fine Arts Work Center in Provincetown, Massachusetts, and in the creative writing M.F.A. program at Brooklyn College.

== Career ==
The Hours (1998) established Cunningham as a major American novelist. Following its 2002 Academy Award-winning film adaptation directed by Stephen Daldry, the novel entered the top ten U.S. fiction best-seller lists alongside Virginia Woolf's Mrs Dalloway. Cunningham's subsequent novels include Specimen Days (2005), By Nightfall (2010), The Snow Queen (2014), and Day (2023).

Cunningham edited a selection of poetry and prose by Walt Whitman, Laws for Creations (2006), and wrote the screenplay adaptation of his own novel A Home at the End of the World (2004). He also co-wrote, with Susan Minot, the screenplay adapted from Minot's novel Evening and served as a producer for the 2007 film Evening, starring Glenn Close, Toni Collette, and Meryl Streep.

In November 2010, Cunningham judged one of NPR's "Three Minute Fiction" contests. In April 2018, he was announced as consulting producer for the Netflix revival miniseries Tales of the City, based on Armistead Maupin's book series of the same name, which premiered on June 7, 2019.

== Themes and literary style ==
Literary scholars have highlighted Cunningham's use of multiperspectivity, intertextual dialogue with modernist and nineteenth-century classics, and examinations of non-traditional kinship, grief, and historical trauma.

In A Home at the End of the World (1990), Cunningham employs four alternating first-person narrators—Jonathan, Bobby, Clare, and Alice—to trace changing family structures and the impact of the HIV/AIDS epidemic from 1960s Cleveland to New York City and Woodstock. Critic Dominic Ording observes that this polyphonic structure allows disparate, introspective viewpoints on the same domestic events to coexist without collapsing into a single authoritative voice.

The Hours (1998) operates as a postmodern palimpsest of Virginia Woolf's Mrs Dalloway, interweaving a single June day in the lives of three women across different eras: Woolf in 1923 Richmond, housewife Laura Brown in post-World War II Los Angeles, and New York editor Clarissa Vaughan at the end of the twentieth century. Scholar Fadwa AbdelRahman notes that Cunningham binds the three narrative strands together through recurring formal and thematic motifs—such as flowers, domestic ritual, water, and mortality—while contrasting conventional domesticity with queer kinship.

In Specimen Days (2005), Cunningham again uses a triptych structure—comprising a 19th-century industrial ghost story, a post-9/11 noir thriller, and a post-apocalyptic science-fiction narrative—set in New York City and haunted by the poetry of Walt Whitman. Literary critic Aris Mousoutzanis analyzes the novel's recurring characters and motifs through Sigmund Freud's concept of the uncanny (Unheimlich) and trauma theory, arguing that Cunningham uses cyclical repetition to critique industrialization, displacement, and idealized narratives of American progress.

By Nightfall (2010) adopts a tightly focalized, present-tense third-person narration centered on Manhattan art dealer Peter Harris, engaging intertextually with Thomas Mann's Death in Venice and Gustave Flaubert's Madame Bovary. Narratologist Maria Mäkelä points out that Cunningham blends free indirect discourse with gnomic, present-tense reflections to create a "double exposure" between the protagonist's immediate desire and his self-conscious impulse to aestheticize his own life.

== Personal life ==
Although Cunningham is gay and married to psychoanalyst Ken Corbett, he dislikes being referred to solely as a gay writer, according to a PlanetOut article. While he often writes about gay characters, he has stated that he does not "want the gay aspects of [his] books to be perceived as their single, primary characteristic." Cunningham lives in Brooklyn, New York City, and works in Manhattan.

== Bibliography ==
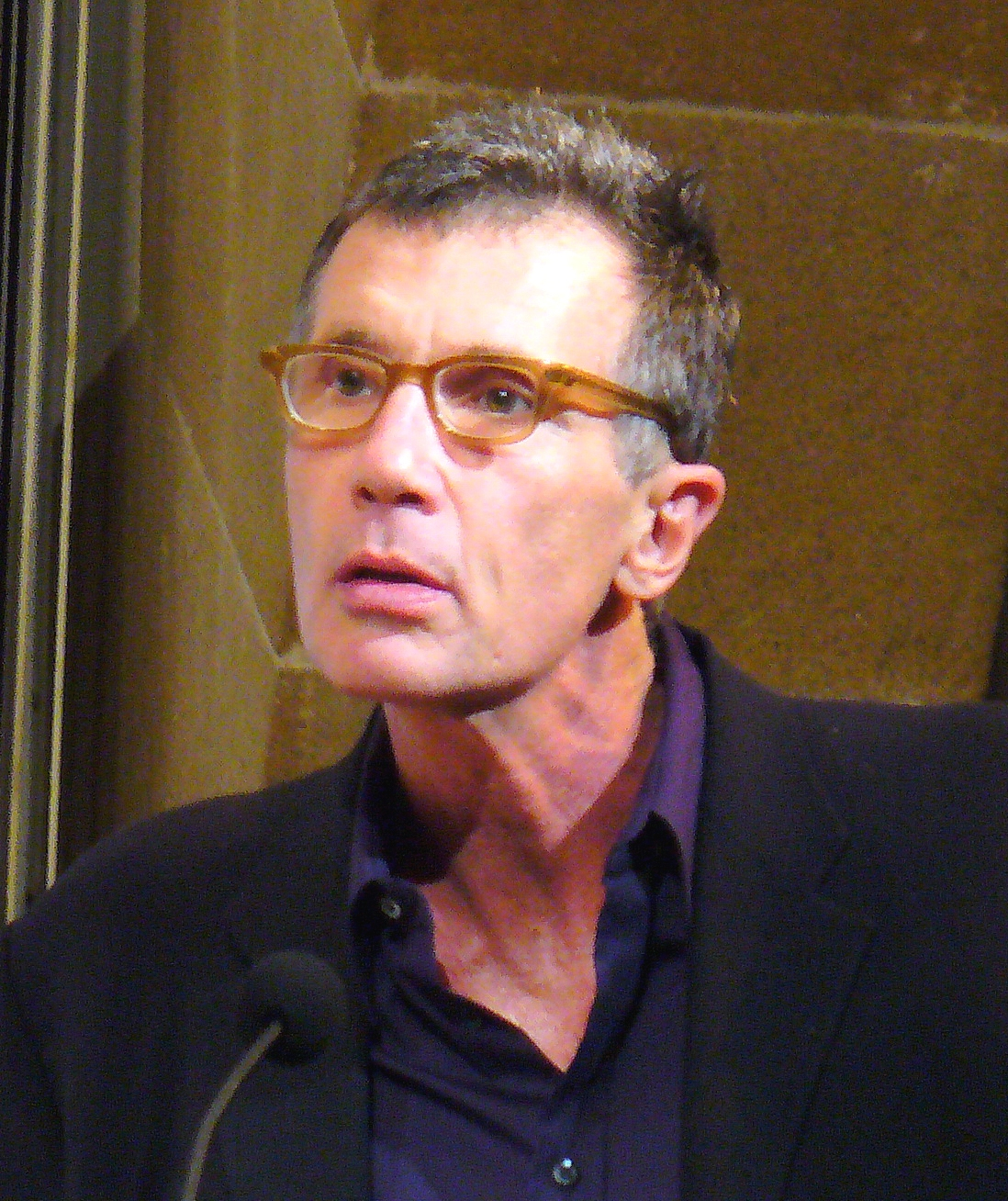
Cunningham reading at a W. H. Auden tribute in New York, 2007

=== Novels ===
- Golden States (1984)
- A Home at the End of the World (1990)
- Flesh and Blood (1995)
- The Hours (1998)
- Specimen Days (2005)
- By Nightfall (2010)
- The Snow Queen (2014)
- Day (2023)

=== Short stories ===
Collections:

- A Wild Swan and Other Tales (2015), Farrar, Straus and Giroux ISBN 978-0374290252, collection of 11 short stories:
  "Dis. Enchant.", "A Wild Swan", "Crazy Old Lady", "Jacked", "Poisoned", "A Monkey's Paw", "Little Man", "Steadfast; Tin", "Beasts", "Her Hair", "Ever/After"

Uncollected short stories:

- "White Angel" (1989), later used as a chapter in novel A Home at the End of the World
- "Mister Brother" (1999)
- "The Destruction Artist" (2007), collected in A Memory, a Monologue, a Rant, and a Prayer (2007), edited by Eve Ensler and Mollie Doyle
- "A Wild Swan" (2010), collected in anthology My Mother She Killed Me, My Father He Ate Me: Forty New Fairy Tales (2010), edited by Kate Bernheimer and Carmen Giménez Smith

=== Non-fiction ===
- "The Slap of Love". Open City. 6. 1996., article
- Land's End: A Walk in Provincetown (2002), travels
- Company (2008), an essay on the influence of Virginia Woolf on Cunningham's writing
- About Time: Fashion and Duration (2020), with Andrew Bolton, couture
- Unsayable: A Life in Writing (2026), a writing memoir

=== Screenplays ===
- A Home at the End of the World (2004)
- Evening (2007)

=== Contributor ===
- Drawn by the Sea (2000) (exhibition catalogue text; 110 signed copies)
- The Voyage Out (2001), by Virginia Woolf (Modern Library Classics edition) (Introduction)
- I Am Not This Body: The Pinhole Photographs of Barbara Ess (2001) (Text)
- Washington Square (2004), by Henry James (Signet Classics edition) (Afterword)
- Death in Venice (2004), by Thomas Mann (new translation by Michael Henry Heim) (Introduction)
- Laws for Creations (2006), poems by Walt Whitman (Editor and introduction)
- Fall River Boys (2012), photo book by Richard Renaldi, introductory essay

== Adaptations ==
- The Hours (2002), film directed by Stephen Daldry, based on novel The Hours
- The Hours (2022), opera with music by Kevin Puts and libretto by Greg Pierce, based on the novel and the film
- A Home at the End of the World (2004), film directed by Michael Mayer, based on novel A Home at the End of the World
- The Destruction Artist (2012), short film directed by Michael Sharpe, based on short story "The Destruction Artist"
- The Hours: A Live Tribute (2016), short film directed by Tim McNeill, based on novel The Hours

== Awards and achievements ==
- "White Angel" was included in the 1989 Best American Short Stories.
- "Mister Brother" was included in the 2000 O. Henry Prize Stories.

For The Hours, Cunningham was awarded the:

- Pulitzer Prize for Fiction – 1999
- PEN/Faulkner Award – 1999
- Gay, Lesbian, Bisexual, and Transgender Book Award – 1999

In 1995, Cunningham received a Whiting Award.

In 1996, Cunningham won the Lambda Literary Award for Gay Fiction for Flesh and Blood.

In 2011, Cunningham won the Fernanda Pivano Award for American Literature in Italy.

In 2024, Cunningham won the Premio Gregor von Rezzori for Day.

== See also ==
- LGBT culture in New York City
- List of LGBT people from New York City
