= Transcendental poetry =

Transcendental poetry is a term related to the theory of poetry and literature and, more precisely, to the fields of aesthetics and romantic philosophy. The expression "transcendental poetry" was created by the German critic and philosopher Friedrich Schlegel (1772-1829) and also used by the poet and philosopher Friedrich von Hardenberg , also known as Novalis. Transcendental poetry links the literary field to the philosophical one, poetry to thinking, and the critical reflection to the artistic creation.

== Origin ==
The German philosopher Immanuel Kant (1724-1804) used the term "transcendental" to mean "a knowledge which does not directly concern the objects of experience, but which concerns our way of knowing such objects. It is a 'knowledge of our way of knowledge', or 'knowledge of limits and possibility of our knowledge.'" The German philosopher Fichte (1762-1814) and then the romantic philosophers Friedrich Schlegel and Novalis found in this kind of self-knowledge the basic principle of the human mind or spirit. "They wanted to show the mechanism and essence of the spirit: self-consciousness is the consciousness that the spirit has of its own activity. Since reality is determined, or structured, or even created by our spirit, self-consciousness is consciousness of reality." Romantic philosophers affirmed that reality is created by the activity of the spirit, and in this way it is poetically produced.

== Definition ==
The most famous definition of transcendental poetry is given by Friedrich Schlegel in the Journal Athenaum (1800):

"There is a poetry whose One and All is the relationship of the ideal and the real: it should thus be called transcendental poetry according to the analogy of the technical language of philosophy. […] But we should not care for a transcendental philosophy unless it were critical, unless it portrayed the producer along with the product, unless it embraced in its system of transcendental thoughts a characterization of transcendental thinking: in the same way, that poetry which is not infrequently encountered in modern poets should combine those transcendental materials and preliminary exercises for a poetic theory of the creative power with the artistic reflection and beautiful self-mirroring."

Friedrich Schlegel writes that transcendental poetry should present the act of artistic creation along with the created work of art. In this way, “this poetry should portray itself with each of its portrayals; everywhere and at the same time, it should be poetry and the poetry of poetry.” A characteristic of transcendental poetry is the self-reflection so that art “in everything that it represents, it must also represent itself.” As a consequence of that, there is no precise difference between a work of art and a work of criticism. A transcendental poem should mirror itself and represent its poetical principle. In doing so, a poem is “poetry of poetry” and a self-conscious, critical production. In this perspective, criticism and artistic self-consciousness are constitutive parts of the creative work. This self-mirroring of the work of art as a reflection on its poetic character is a constitutive element of modern poetic creation, and it also becomes a constitutive element of the work of art.
