= A Home at the End of the World (novel) =

1990 novel by Michael Cunningham

- First edition cover
- Author: Michael Cunningham
- Language: English
- Publisher: Farrar, Straus and Giroux
- Publication date: November 7, 1990
- Publication place: United States
- Media type: Print (Hardcover and Paperback)
- Pages: 344 pp
- ISBN: 0-374-17250-1
- OCLC: 22309642
- Dewey Decimal: 813/.54 20
- LC Class: PS3553.U484 H66 1990

A Home at the End of the World is a 1990 novel by American author Michael Cunningham.

The book is narrated in the first person, with the narrator changing in each chapter. Bobby and Jonathan are the main narrators, but several chapters are narrated by Alice, Jonathan's mother, and Clare. An excerpt from A Home at the End of the World was published in The New Yorker, chosen for Best American Short Stories 1989, and featured on NPR's Selected Shorts.

== Plot summary ==
Bobby had grown up in a home in suburban Cleveland, Ohio during the 1960s and 1970s where partying and drugs were a recurring theme. He has already witnessed the death of his mother and beloved older brother by the time he befriends Jonathan, who comes from a sheltered family. After Bobby finds his father is dead, Jonathan's family takes him in.

Bobby and Jonathan become best friends, and also experiment sexually. The two eventually lose touch, but meet up again in their 20s in 1980s New York, where Bobby moves in with Jonathan and his eccentric roommate Clare. Clare had planned to have a baby with Jonathan (who is openly gay), but Bobby and Clare become lovers, while Jonathan still has feelings for Bobby. Clare and Bobby have a baby and move to a country home together with Jonathan.

The trio form their own family, questioning traditional definitions of family and love, while dealing with the complications of their polyamorous relationship.

== Censorship ==
In April 2025, the Lukashenko regime added the book to the List of printed publications containing information messages and materials, the distribution of which could harm the national interests of Belarus.

== Adaptations ==
- A Home at the End of the World (2004), film directed by Michael Mayer
