= Richard Renaldi =

American portrait photographer

Richard Renaldi (born 1968) is an American portrait photographer. His four main books each contain portraits of people Renaldi met in public, and some landscapes, made over numerous years with an 8×10 large format view camera. Those books are: Figure and Ground (2006)—various people throughout the USA; Fall River Boys (2009)—young men (and some women) growing up in the post-industrial city of Fall River, Massachusetts; Touching Strangers (2014)—strangers posed by Renaldi physically touching in some way, made all over the USA; and Manhattan Sunday (2016)—LGBT people photographed between midnight and 10 am on Sundays mainly on the streets of Manhattan having left nightclubs.

Touching Strangers had a solo exhibition at Aperture Foundation, and Manhattan Sunday, for which Renaldi received a Guggenheim Fellowship in 2015, had a solo show at George Eastman Museum.

== Life and work ==
Renaldi was born in Chicago, Illinois, in 1968 and grew up there. He moved to New York City in 1986. He received a BFA in photography from New York University in 1990. He lived in Los Angeles for two years, starting in 2003.

Figure and Ground was made over seven years. Fall River Boys was made over nine years, beginning in 2000. Touching Strangers was made over seven years, beginning in 2007, and inspired by an earlier series of Renaldi's, Bus Travelers, "that looked at the intimate spaces strangers often share." Manhattan Sunday was made between 2010 and 2016.

Renaldi established Charles Lane Press in 2008 to publish new projects by contemporary photographers.

== Publications ==
=== Publications by Renaldi ===
- Figure and Ground. New York City: Aperture, 2006. ISBN 978-1597110297. With an essay by Roger Hargreaves.
- Fall River Boys. New York City: Charles Lane Press, 2009. With an introductory essay by Michael Cunningham. Edition of 1200 copies.
- Touching Strangers. New York City: Aperture, 2014. ISBN 978-1-59711-249-9. With an introduction by Teju Cole.
- Matte: Richard Renaldi. Matte Magazine, No. 31. Brooklyn, NY: Matthew Leifheit, 2015. (Note: Matte's page about Matte: Richard Renaldi is here and the whole contents can be viewed here at MagCloud.) Includes photographs from Renaldi's Young Americans series.
- Manhattan Sunday. New York City: Aperture, 2016. ISBN 978-1-59711-376-2. Photographs and text by Renaldi.
- Western Lives. Casper, WY: Nicolaysen Art Museum. Lisa Hatchadoorian. ISBN 978-0979848506. Exhibition catalogue.
- I Want Your Love. Tokyo: Super Labo, 2018. ISBN 978-4-908512-22-3.

=== Publications with contributions by Renaldi ===
- Strangers: The First ICP Triennial of Photography and Video. Göttingen, Germany: Steidl; New York City: International Center of Photography, 2003. ISBN 978-3882439298. Exhibition catalogue with essays and artist pages.
- Art Photography Now. Berlin: Braus, 2005. By Susan Bright. ISBN 978-3899041866.

== Solo exhibitions ==
- Touching Strangers, Aperture Foundation, New York City, 2014; Loyola University Museum of Art, Loyola University Chicago, Chicago, 2015.
- Manhattan Sunday, George Eastman Museum, Rochester, New York, 2017.

== Awards ==
- 2015: Guggenheim Fellowship from the John Simon Guggenheim Memorial Foundation
