= Gerald Renaldi =

Archdeacon of Armagh (1556–1559)

Gerald Renaldi (some sources Reynolds) was Archdeacon of Armagh from 1556 to 1559.
