= Chalk outline =

Outline drawn on the ground marking evidence at a crime scene

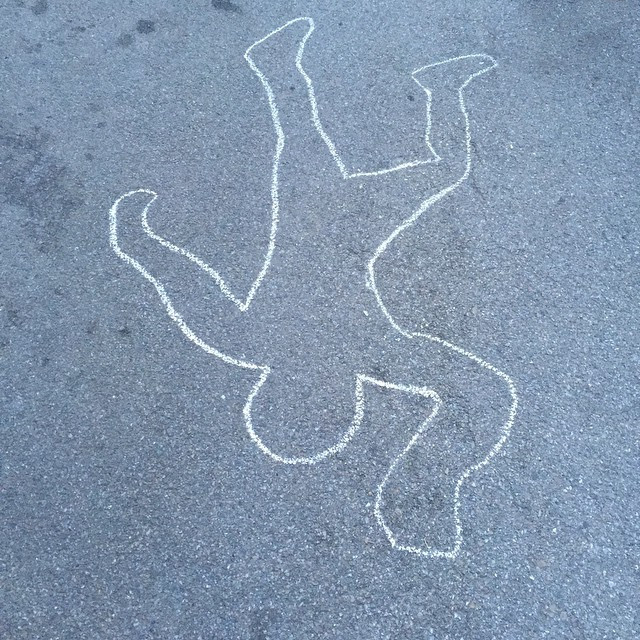
A chalk outline, drawn around a volunteer laying on the ground

A chalk outline is a temporary outline, typically of a person, drawn on the ground, outlining evidence at a crime scene. The outline provides context for photographs of the crime scene and assists investigators in preserving the evidence. Modern investigators almost never use chalk or tape as outlines at a crime scene to avoid contaminating the evidence. Although rare in modern investigations, they have become a literary trope in popular culture.

== Form ==
Classically, chalk outlines are drawn in white or bright yellow chalk, but paint or white tape may also be used. In the case of a body, a chalk outline might be drawn immediately before the body is to be removed, but after the medical examiner has examined the body.

Chalk outlines in practice were typically rough shapes of the body's position and did not include specific arms and leg orientation.

== History and modern use ==
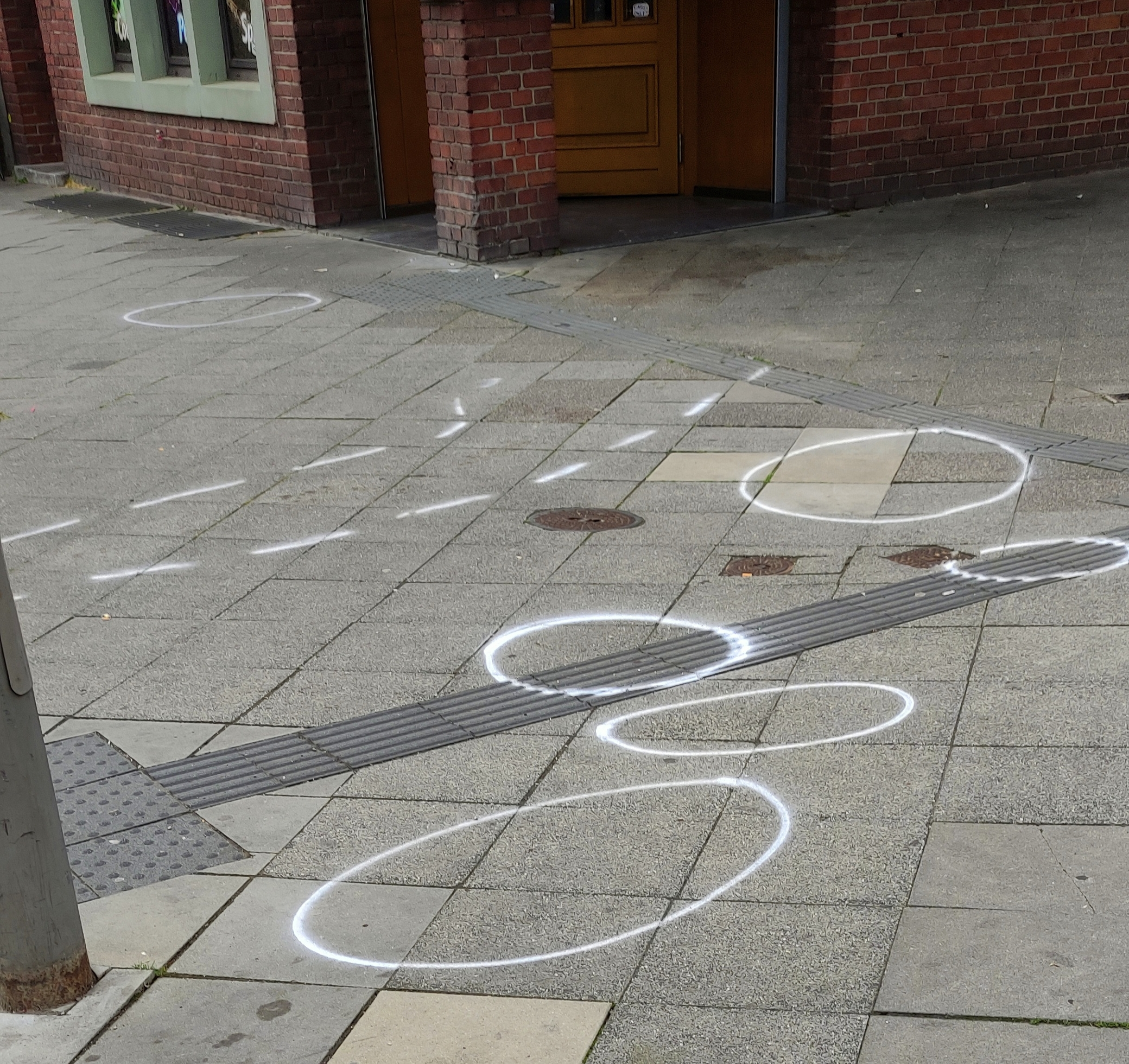
Chalk outlines at the scene of a homicide in Aachen, Germany, in 2025

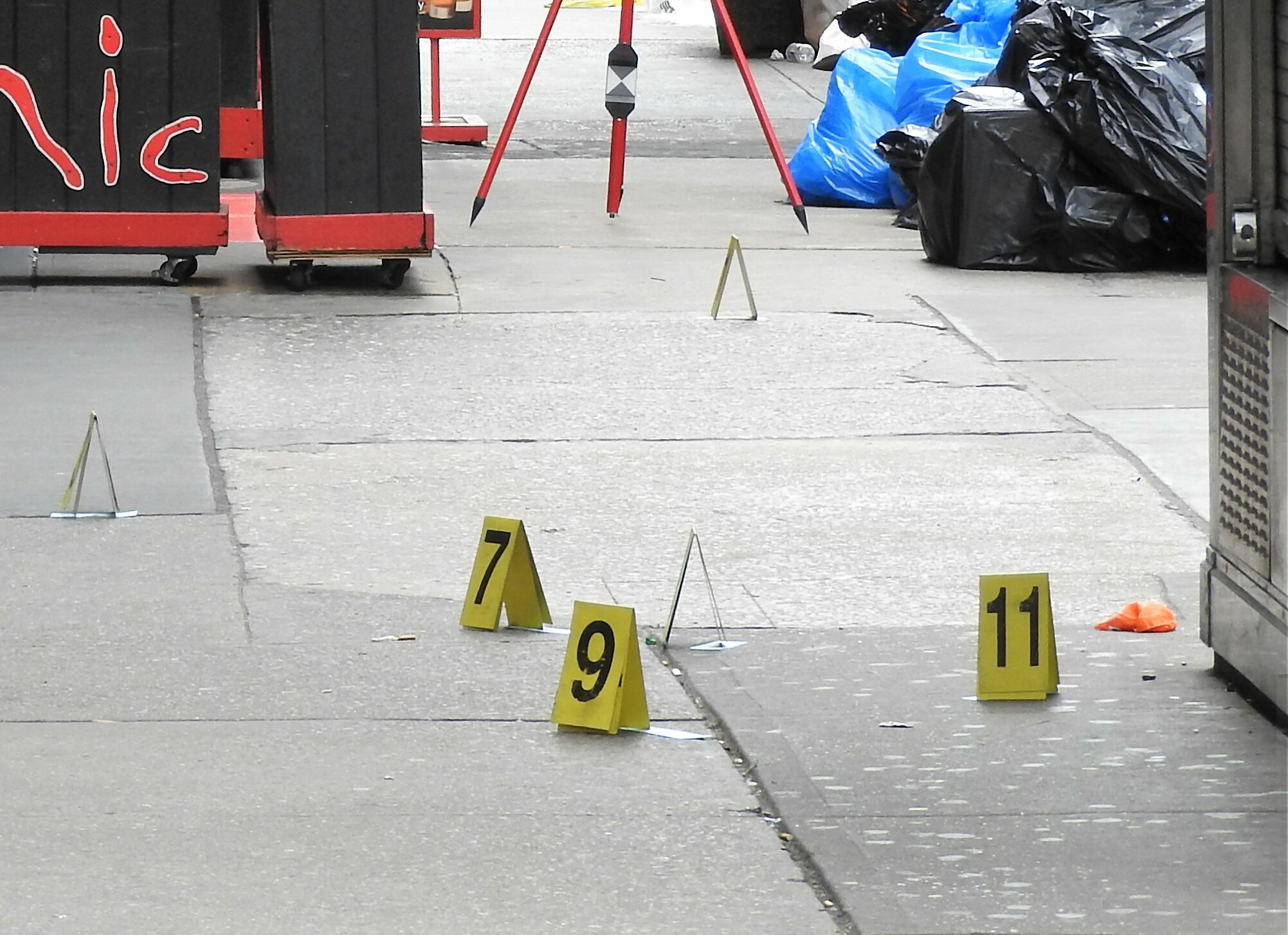
Numbered markers at the scene of a murder in Manhattan, New York City

While chalk outlines were occasionally used in the past, they were often drawn by the police for press photographers, as opposed to investigative purposes. This allowed the press to take a picture and represent the scene accurately without graphically depicting a body.

Some sources indicate that, while not part of official procedure, some uninformed investigators may occasionally draw chalk outlines, particularly in non-homicide accidents. The term "chalk fairy" is occasionally used to describe an officer that makes the chalk outline, often without authorization and while unwittingly contaminating the scene.

While the use of chalk is uncommon, investigators may make smaller marks, or use removable flags, index cards, or markers, to indicate important positions, particularly if other references are not available.

== In popular culture ==
Chalk outlines of bodies are a familiar trope in popular culture. They are often used in humorous ways, depicting awkward positioning or meticulous precision, or portending a character's impending death by having them prematurely fall into a drawn outline. The Naked Gun series made extensive use of the prop, as have a number of other comedies.

More generally, the term has become synonymous with tragic death and has been used in literature, music, and visual arts. Some author guides have listed the procedure as standard.
