= Hanya Yanagihara =

American novelist and travel writer

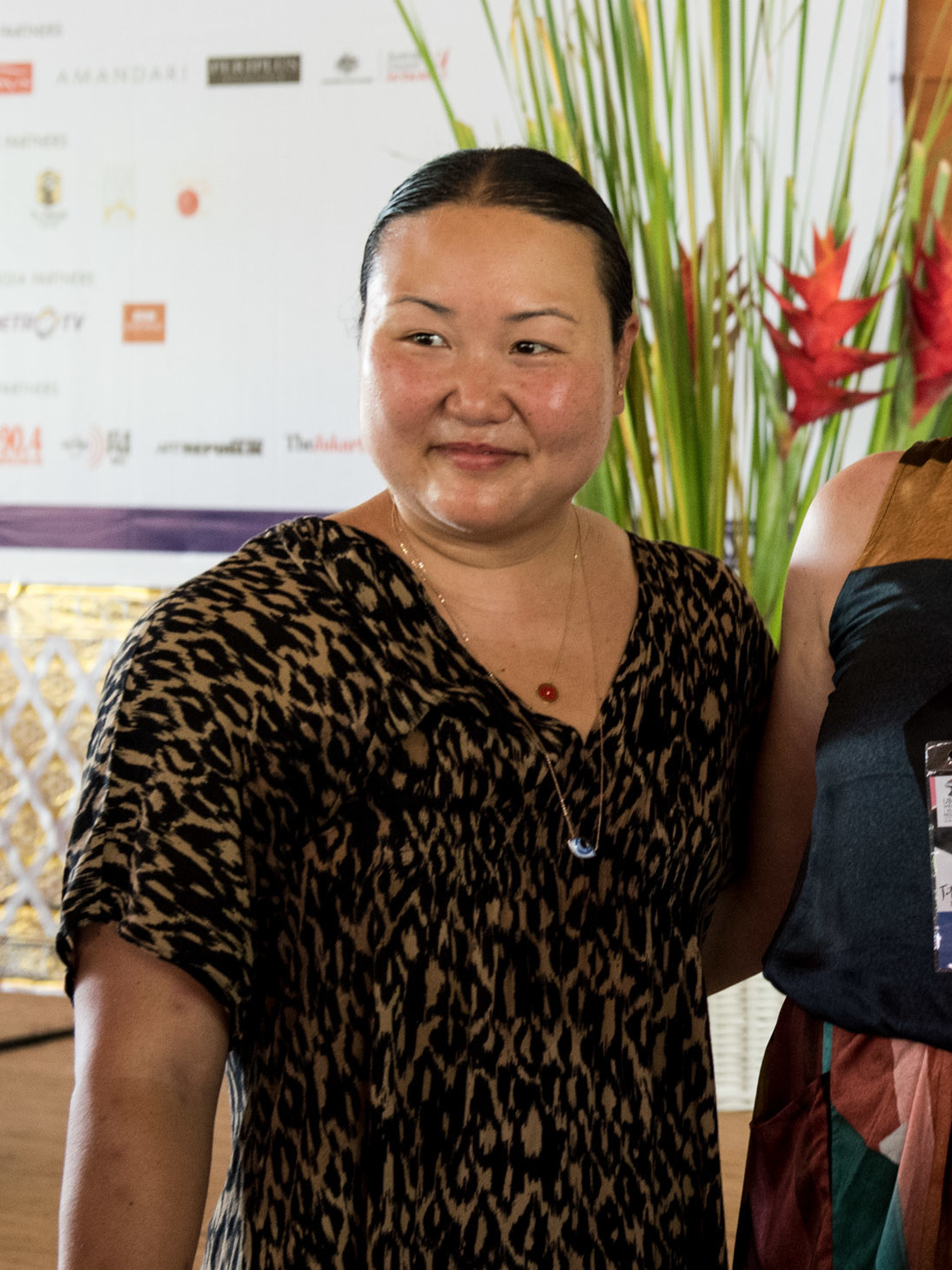
- Yanagihara in 2016
- Born: 1974 (age 51–52); Los Angeles, California, U.S.
- Education: Smith College
- Occupations: Author; writer; journalist

Hanya Yanagihara (born 1974) is an American novelist, editor, and travel writer. Yanagihara grew up in Hawaii. She is best known for her bestselling novel A Little Life, which was shortlisted for the 2015 Booker Prize, and for being the editor-in-chief of T Magazine.

== Early life ==
Hanya Yanagihara was born in 1974 in Los Angeles. Her father Ronald Yanagihara was from Hawaii, and worked as a hematologist and oncologist. Her mother was born in Seoul. Yanagihara is of Japanese descent through her father and of Korean descent through her mother. As a child, Yanagihara moved frequently with her family, living in Hawaii, New York, Maryland, California and Texas. She attended the Punahou School in Hawaii before graduating from Smith College in 1995.

Yanagihara has said that her father introduced her as a girl to the work of Philip Roth and to "British writers of a certain age", such as Anita Brookner, Iris Murdoch, and Barbara Pym. Of Pym and Brookner, she says, "there is a suspicion of the craft that the male writers of their generation didn't have, a metaphysical reckoning of what is it actually doing for the world". She has said that "the contemporary writers I admire most are Hilary Mantel, Kazuo Ishiguro, and John Banville".

== Career ==
After college, Yanagihara moved to New York and worked for several years as a publicist. She wrote and was an editor for Condé Nast Traveler.

Her first novel, The People in the Trees, partly based on the real-life case of the virologist Daniel Carleton Gajdusek, was praised as one of the best novels of 2013.

Yanagihara's A Little Life was published on March 10, 2015, and received widespread critical acclaim. The book was shortlisted for the 2015 Man Booker Prize for fiction and the 2016 Women's Prize for Fiction and won the 2015 Kirkus Prize for fiction. Yanagihara was also selected as a finalist for the 2015 National Book Award in Fiction. A Little Life defied the expectations of its editor, of Yanagihara's agent, and of the author herself, that it would not sell well.

Her 2015 novel A Little Life has also been adapted for the stage. A theatrical adaptation directed by Ivo van Hove premiered in Amsterdam in 2018 and later ran in London at the Harold Pinter Theatre in 2023.

Yanagihara described writing the book at its best as "glorious as surfing; it felt like being carried aloft on something I couldn't conjure but was lucky enough to have caught, if for just a moment. At its worst, I felt I was somehow losing my ownership over the book. It felt, oddly, like being one of those people who adopt a tiger or lion when the cat's a baby and cuddly and manageable, and then watch in dismay and awe when it turns on them as an adult". During an intense stretch while on vacation, Yanagihara wrote from 4 p.m. to 1 or 2 a.m. for four nights in a row, describing the experience as the bleakest, most physically exhausting, and emotionally enervating writing experience she'd had.

In 2015, she left Condé Nast to become a deputy editor at T: The New York Times Style Magazine. She has said that after her sophomore novel became a best seller, people in the publishing industry were baffled by her decision to take a job at T. Describing the publishing world as "a provincial community, more or less as snobby as the fashion industry", she said, "I'd get these underhanded comments like, 'oh, I never knew there were words [in T Magazine] worth reading'". Of working as an editor while writing fiction on the side, she says, "I've never done it any other way". In 2017, she became the editor-in-chief of T. She announced she was stepping down in 2026.

Yanagihara's third novel, To Paradise, was published on January 11, 2022, and reached number one on The New York Times Best Seller list.

In 2025, A Little Life and To Paradise were included on a list of publications that "could harm the national interests of the Republic of Belarus" and banned from distribution in that country.

== Awards and honours ==
Year	Book	Award	Category	Result	Ref
2015	A Little Life	Booker Prize	—	Shortlisted	
2015	A Little Life	Kirkus Prize	Fiction	Won	
2015	A Little Life	National Book Award	Fiction	Shortlisted	
2016	A Little Life	Women's Prize for Fiction	—	Shortlisted	
2017	A Little Life	International Dublin Literary Award	—	Shortlisted	

== Works and publications ==
- The People in the Trees, 2013
- A Little Life, 2015
- To Paradise, 2022
