= List of Captain Scarlet and the Mysterons episodes =

This is a list of episodes of the British science-fiction television series Captain Scarlet and the Mysterons, filmed by Gerry and Sylvia Anderson's production company Century 21 for distribution by ITC Entertainment. The series ran for 32 episodes and was first broadcast between 1967 and 1968 on the Associated Television network.

== Main series (1967–1968) ==
All episodes are of 25 minutes duration. Episodes are listed in the official order published by ITC. Air dates are the original broadcast dates in the ATV Midlands area unless otherwise stated.

No.	Title	Directed by	Written by	Original air date	Prod. code	Prod. no.
1	"The Mysterons"	Desmond Saunders	Gerry & Sylvia Anderson	29 April 1967 (test transmission, ATV London); 29 September 1967 (official premiere, ATV Midlands)	SCA 1	1
When their city on Mars is attacked by human astronauts under the command of Spectrum's Captain Black, the Mysterons vow to destroy all life on Earth. The aliens' first objective is the assassination of the World President.
2	"Winged Assassin"	David Lane	Tony Barwick	6 October 1967	SCA 2	2
No longer under the Mysterons' control, but retaining their power of "retro-metabolism", Captain Scarlet joins Spectrum's operation to protect the aliens' next target – the Director General of the United Asian Republic.
3	"Big Ben Strikes Again"	Brian Burgess	Tony Barwick	13 October 1967	SCA 3	3
The Mysterons target London with a stolen nuclear bomb.
4	"Manhunt"	Alan Perry	Tony Barwick	20 October 1967	SCA 4	5
After Captain Black inadvertently exposes himself to radiation, thus making himself detectable on long-range Geiger counters, Spectrum mobilises its forces to apprehend the Mysterons' primary agent.
5	"Point 783"	Robert Lynn	Peter Curran & David Williams	22 December 1967	SCA 5	4
The Mysterons threaten to assassinate the Supreme Commander of the Earth Forces.
6	"Operation Time"	Ken Turner	Richard Conway & Stephen J. Mattick	17 November 1967	SCA 6	6
Spectrum is initially baffled by the Mysterons' threat to "kill time", which is discovered to be a reference to a prominent army general who is about to undergo experimental neurosurgery.
7	"Renegade Rocket"	Brian Burgess	Ralph Hart	19 January 1968	SCA 7	7
The Mysterons engineer the launch of an experimental variable geometry rocket.
8	"White as Snow"	Robert Lynn	Peter Curran & David Williams	3 November 1967	SCA 8	8
The Mysterons threaten to assassinate the commander-in-chief of Spectrum, Colonel White.
9	"Seek and Destroy"	Alan Perry	Peter Curran & David Williams	5 January 1968	SCA 11	9
The Mysterons threaten to kill one of Spectrum's Angel pilots.
10	"Spectrum Strikes Back"	Ken Turner	Tony Barwick	24 November 1967	SCA 9	10
Following the events of "Operation Time", Spectrum has created two anti-Mysteron devices, both of which are given an early field test when the secret conference hosting the unveiling is sabotaged.
11	"Avalanche"	Brian Burgess	Shane Rimmer	27 October 1967	SCA 10	11
The Mysterons launch a series of crippling attacks on the Frost Line Outer Space Defence System in Canada.
12	"Shadow of Fear"	Robert Lynn	Tony Barwick	2 February 1968	SCA 13	12
With the help of an observatory in the Himalayas, Spectrum lands a probe on the Martian moon Phobos to perform detailed orbital reconnaissance of the Red Planet.
13	"The Trap"	Alan Perry	Alan Pattillo	10 November 1967	SCA 17	17
The Mysterons threaten to assassinate the commanders of Earth's armed forces.
14	"Special Assignment"	Robert Lynn	Tony Barwick	1 December 1967	SCA 22	20
Scarlet is dismissed from Spectrum after incurring a large gambling debt, and is blackmailed by the Mysterons into assisting them in their plans to destroy the entire North American continent.
15	"Lunarville 7"	Robert Lynn	Tony Barwick	15 December 1967	SCA 15	16
The Lunar Controller declares the Moon neutral in the "war of nerves" between Earth and Mars. Dispatched to investigate suspicious activity on the satellite's far side, Scarlet, Captain Blue and Lieutenant Green make a shocking discovery.
16	"The Heart of New York"	Alan Perry	Tony Barwick	8 December 1967	SCA 12	13
A trio of bank robbers plot to outwit Spectrum after the Mysterons threaten to destroy the "heart" of New York City.
17	"Traitor"	Alan Perry	Tony Barwick	14 January 1968 (ATV London)	SCA 21	21
Scarlet and Blue investigate a series of Spectrum hovercraft crashes in the Australian Outback to expose a traitor in the organisation.
18	"Model Spy"	Ken Turner	Bill Hedley	29 December 1967	SCA 18	18
A French intelligence chief, known publicly as a leading fashion designer, is targeted by Mysteron reconstructions of two of his models.
19	"Fire at Rig 15"	Ken Turner	Bryan Cooper	16 February 1968	SCA 14	14
The Mysterons target the oil refinery that supplies fuel for all of Spectrum's vehicles.
20	"Flight to Atlantica"	Leo Eaton	Tony Barwick	24 March 1968 (ATV London)	SCA 28	26
After drinking spiked champagne, Captains Blue and Ochre become mindless pawns in the Mysterons' plot to destroy the world's most important naval complex, Atlantica.
21	"Crater 101"	Ken Turner	Tony Barwick	26 January 1968	SCA 19	22
Following the events of "Lunarville 7", Scarlet, Blue and Green return to the Moon to destroy the Mysteron's newly completed base in the Humboldt Sea.
22	"Dangerous Rendezvous"	Brian Burgess	Tony Barwick	9 February 1968	SCA 20	19
Following the events of "Crater 101", the Mysterons threaten to destroy Cloudbase. Exploiting the unique properties of the crytal pulsator recovered from the Mysterons' lunar complex, Spectrum contacts the aliens directly in an attempt to make peace.
23	"Noose of Ice"	Ken Turner	Peter Curran & David Williams	12 March 1968	SCA 26	27
The Mysterons target an Arctic mine that is extracting a metal to be used to construct a new Earth space fleet.
24	"Treble Cross"	Alan Perry	Tony Barwick	23 February 1968	SCA 27	28
The Mysterons threaten to destroy the world capital, Futura City.
25	"Inferno"	Alan Perry	Tony Barwick & Shane Rimmer	16 April 1968	SCA 31	31
The Mysterons threaten to destroy an irrigation complex in South America.
26	"Flight 104"	Robert Lynn	Tony Barwick	1 March 1968	SCA 24	24
The Mysterons vow to sabotage a Spectrum conference in Switzerland that will determine the manner of Earth's return to Mars.
27	"Place of Angels"	Leo Eaton	Leo Eaton	8 March 1968	SCA 23	23
Threatening to destroy the "Place of the Angels", the Mysterons engineer the theft of a lethal virus from a research centre.
28	"Expo 2068"	Leo Eaton	Shane Rimmer	26 March 1968	SCA 29	29
The Mysterons threaten to obliterate the entire Atlantic Seaboard of North America.
29	"The Launching"	Brian Burgess	Peter Curran & David Williams	2 April 1968	SCA 16	15
When the Mysterons seemingly threaten the President of the United States with assassination, Spectrum implements maximum security measures around his residence. But as the Mysterons' self-imposed deadline approaches, Scarlet realises that the organisation is protecting the wrong target.
30	"Codename Europa"	Alan Perry	David Lee	21 March 1968 (Granada Television)	SCA 25	25
A reconstructed electronics professor targets Europe's three most powerful statesmen.
31	"Attack on Cloudbase"	Ken Turner	Tony Barwick	5 May 1968 (ATV London)	SCA 30	30
The Mysterons themselves arrive on Earth to destroy Cloudbase...or do they?
32	"The Inquisition"	Ken Turner	Tony Barwick	12 May 1968 (ATV London)	SCA 32	32
Clip show episode: Blue is drugged and wakes up three months later facing questioning from a man claiming to be from Spectrum Intelligence.

== Audio episodes ==
In 1967, Century 21 released an additional five Captain Scarlet adventures as 7-inch vinyl EP records (promoted as "mini-albums").

No.	Title	Album Code	Written by	Produced by	First released	Length
1	"Introducing Captain Scarlet"	MA 131	Angus P. Allan	Denis Skelton	September 1967	21 mins approx.
An adaptation of the first episode of the TV series, "The Mysterons", featuring audio flashbacks with some newly recorded dialogue. The plot concerns Colonel White reporting to a security council on the events surrounding Spectrum's first encounter with the Mysterons and its mission to protect the World President. The story ends with the news that the Mysteron double of Captain Scarlet has returned to life and that the officer's loyalty to Spectrum can be restored with the aid of an advanced computer (a feature of Gerry and Sylvia Anderson's original TV script).
2	"Captain Scarlet and the Mysterons"	MA 132	Angus P. Allan	Denis Skelton	September 1967	21 mins approx.
The World Air Force plane Goliath has been taken over by the Mysterons and is now on a collision course with Atlantic Airport. Scarlet must board the aircraft and destroy it before it reaches its target.
3	"Captain Scarlet Is Indestructible"	MA 133	Richard O'Neill	Denis Skelton	November 1967	21 mins approx.
The Mysterons threaten to destroy the World Cultural Council.
4	"Captain Scarlet of Spectrum"	MA 134	Angus P. Allan	Denis Skelton	November 1967	21 mins approx.
The Mysterons threaten to destroy the Moon.
5	"Captain Scarlet versus Captain Black"	MA 135	Richard O'Neill	Denis Skelton	November 1967	21 mins approx.
Captain Black steals a Spectrum Pursuit Vehicle equipped with one of the organisation's new electro-ray rifles. Pursued by Scarlet and Blue, he takes two children hostage.

== Compilation films ==
Two compilation films, each comprising re-edited versions of four of the TV episodes, were originally released in the early 1980s. A third film is due to be released as part of the Captain Scarlet Super Space Theatre Blu-ray box set in October 2026.

No.	Title (Year)	Compilation of	First released	Length
1	Revenge of the Mysterons from Mars (1981)	"Shadow of Fear", "Lunarville 7", "Crater 101", "Dangerous Rendezvous"	1981 or January 1982	91 mins approx.
2	Captain Scarlet vs. the Mysterons (1981)	"The Mysterons", "Winged Assassin", "Seek and Destroy", "Attack on Cloudbase"	1982	96 mins approx.
2	Target: Captain Black! (2026)	"Manhunt", "The Heart of New York", "Model Spy", "Treble Cross"	9 November 2026	96 mins approx.

== CGI test film ==
The 2005 CGI reboot series, New Captain Scarlet, was preceded by a short test film titled Captain Scarlet and the Return of the Mysterons, which had two private screenings (in 2000 and 2001).

Title	Directed by	Written by	Original release date	Length
"Captain Scarlet and the Return of the Mysterons"	Gerry Anderson & John Needham	Gerry Anderson & John Needham	Unaired	4 mins approx.
The Mysterons renew their threat to destroy all life on Earth. Pretending to be free of the aliens' control, Captain Black infiltrates the newly refitted Cloudbase and abducts Captain Blue. It is up to Captain Scarlet to stop Black and the hypnotised Blue destroying Drontenon Power Station with a Spectrum Patrol Car filled with explosives.
