= Noose of Ice =

- Captain Scarlet and the Mysterons episode
- Episode no.: Episode 23
- Directed by: Ken Turner
- Written by: Peter Curran and David Williams
- Cinematography by: Julien Lugrin
- Editing by: Bob Dearberg
- Production code: SCA 26
- Original air date: 12 March 1968

Guest character voices
- Gary Files as Neilson; David Healy as General Rebus; Martin King as the tower controller and the security guard; Jeremy Wilkin as Commander Rhodes

Episode chronology
← Previous "Dangerous Rendezvous"	Next → "Treble Cross"

"Noose of Ice" is the 23rd episode of Captain Scarlet and the Mysterons, a British Supermarionation television series created by Gerry and Sylvia Anderson and filmed by their production company Century 21 Productions. Written by Peter Curran and David Williams and directed by Ken Turner, it was first broadcast on 12 March 1968 on ATV Midlands.

Set in 2068, the series depicts a "war of nerves" between Earth and the Mysterons: a hostile race of Martians with the power to create functioning copies of destroyed people or objects and use them to carry out acts of aggression against humanity. Earth is defended by a military organisation called Spectrum, whose top agent, Captain Scarlet, was murdered by the Mysterons and replaced by a reconstruction that later broke free of their control. Scarlet's double has a self-healing power that enables him to recover from injuries that would be fatal to anyone else, making him Spectrum's best asset in its fight against the Mysterons.

In "Noose of Ice", the Mysterons target an undersea Arctic mine that is extracting a rare metal which is vital to the construction of a new Earth space fleet.

== Plot ==
A new space fleet is being built to enable Earth to launch a counter-offensive against the Mysterons on Mars. To shorten the journey time to the Red Planet, the Space Administration is fortifying the ships with tritonium metal, allowing them to travel faster while withstanding the higher stresses. Tritonium is found only at the North Pole, where the Hotspot Tower mining facility is extracting it from the ocean floor.

When the Mysterons threaten to sabotage the space fleet, Colonel White sends Captains Scarlet and Blue to the Space Administration Headquarters in New York City to be briefed by the head of the Administration, General Rebus. Scarlet and Blue then travel to the Arctic to assess the security at Hotspot Tower. The controller, Commander Rhodes, tells them that the lake around the tower and the undersea mine is prevented from freezing thanks to giant heating elements powered by electric current originating from Eskimo Booster Station.

Unknown to Scarlet, Blue and Rhodes, a maintenance technician, Neilson, has been killed in a blizzard and replaced with a double under Mysteron control. On the orders of Captain Black, the double travels to the booster station and cuts the power to the heating elements. The rapidly-freezing lake forms a "noose of ice" that threatens to crush the mining facility.

With all lifts to the surface rendered inoperative, Scarlet puts on an underwater suit and exits the mine through an airlock. He then races to the booster station, where Neilson holds him at gunpoint. Scarlet throws a loose electric cable at the metal stairs on which Neilson is standing, fatally electrocuting the Mysteron agent. He then restores the power to the heating elements, melting the ice and saving Hotspot Tower. However, the Mysterons have had a partial success: the mine is severely damaged and will be out of operation for at least six months.

== Regular voice cast ==
- Ed Bishop as Captain Blue
- Cy Grant as Lieutenant Green
- Donald Gray as Colonel White, Captain Black and the Mysterons
- Francis Matthews as Captain Scarlet

== Production ==
The closing credits incorrectly state that the episode was written by Tony Barwick. "Noose of Ice" follows on directly from Barwick's episode "Flight 104", in which the nature of Earth's return to Mars has yet to be decided. Although "Noose of Ice" was filmed and originally broadcast after "Flight 104", the running order published by distributor ITC Entertainment places it before that episode, disrupting the series continuity.

The mine tower was designed by special effects assistant Mike Trim. To allow for more realistic effects shots, parts of the miniature filming model were built in a scale larger than what Century 21 normally used. Parts of the mine control room set first appeared in the film Thunderbirds Are Go (1966), while the booster station interior recycled elements of the Skyship One gravity compensator room from Thunderbird 6 (1968). The scale model representing the Space Administration building was a re-use of the SHEF Headquarters exterior from the episode "Point 783".

Some of the incidental music was originally composed for Stingray and Thunderbirds. Scenes featuring music from these earlier productions include Neilson's death in the blizzard, the ice forming around Hotspot Tower and the closing scene of the episode.

The puppet playing Neilson first appeared as Captain Brown in "The Mysterons". "Noose of Ice" marked the fourth occasion in which the puppet's character was killed and reconstructed by the Mysterons: it had also previously played Major Reeves in "Renegade Rocket" and Professor Carney in "Codename Europa". It also appeared as supporting characters in "Flight 104", "Special Assignment" and "Fire at Rig 15". The puppet playing General Rebus also appeared as the Base Concord Commander in "Renegade Rocket" and non-speaking background characters in "Special Assignment" and "Seek and Destroy". The Hotspot Tower guard had previously played Jason Smith in "Fire at Rig 15". Commander Rhodes later appeared as the regular character Sam Loover in Joe 90.

== Reception ==
Andrew Thomas of Dreamwatch magazine regarded "Noose of Ice" as one of the series' best episodes. He praised the episode for highlighting the vulnerability of Scarlet, a former Mysteron agent, to electric current: "there is a very real danger that Scarlet may be electrocuted when re-connecting the power supply." Geoff Willmetts considered the episode, with its "freezing water", to be "one of the cleverest from a special effects point of view", while Shane M. Dallmann of Video Watchdog magazine called it "superlative in the miniatures department". Andrew Pixley and Julie Rogers of Starburst magazine named Neilson's electrocution as one of the series' most violent moments.

In his book, Spectrum Is Indestructible, Fred McNamara considered "Noose of Ice" to be one of the series' "more disposable" instalments, criticising its "interminable exposition" and what he saw as a lack of action. Commenting that it features "little else [...] other than characters sitting and talking, or standing and talking", McNamara thought the episode was let down by the fact that certain plot elements, such as the space fleet and the mine operation itself, are mentioned but never seen on screen. He called it a "bloodthirsty" story, noting the "graphic" electrocution of Neilson's Mysteron double, and expressed disappointment with the time-lapse model shots of ice forming around Hotspot Tower, suggesting that realistic simulations of expanding ice were beyond the abilities of Century 21's effects unit. In a later article, however, he ranked the episode among Captain Scarlet's best, describing it as an "underrated gem" with "exemplary" effects and a "moody" setting that "[elevate] 'Noose of Ice' into a exciting techno-disaster thriller for Captain Scarlet." He also wrote that the "race against time" to stop Neilson leads to a "classically nail-biting climax".
