= Flight 104 =

- Captain Scarlet and the Mysterons episode
- Episode no.: Episode 26
- Directed by: Robert Lynn
- Written by: Tony Barwick
- Cinematography by: Ted Catford
- Editing by: Bob Dearberg
- Production code: SCA 24
- Original air date: 1 March 1968

Guest character voices
- Gary Files as Joe and Novena Airport Worker; David Healy as Dr Conrad; Martin King as Bill Williams (Novena Airport Chief); Liz Morgan as Novena Airport Announcer; Jeremy Wilkin as Harry

Episode chronology
| ← Previous "Inferno" | Next → "Place of Angels" |

"Flight 104" is the 26th episode of Captain Scarlet and the Mysterons, a British Supermarionation television series created by Gerry and Sylvia Anderson and filmed by their production company Century 21 Productions. Written by Tony Barwick and directed by Robert Lynn, it was first broadcast on 1 March 1968 on ATV Midlands.

Set in 2068, the series depicts a "war of nerves" between Earth and the Mysterons: a race of Martians with the power to create functioning copies of destroyed people or objects and use them to carry out acts of aggression against humanity. Earth is defended by a military organisation called Spectrum, whose top agent, Captain Scarlet, was killed by the Mysterons and replaced by a reconstruction that subsequently broke free of their control. Scarlet's double has a self-healing power that enables him to recover from injuries that would be fatal to anyone else, making him Spectrum's best asset in its fight against the Mysterons.

In "Flight 104", the Mysterons take control of an airliner that is flying Scarlet, Captain Blue and an astrophysicist to a secret conference that has been called to discuss a proposed return mission to the Mysterons' planet, Mars.

== Plot ==
A top-secret conference is to be held at Lake Toma, Switzerland to discuss a proposed return to the Mysterons' planet, Mars. One of the conference delegates, astrophysicist Dr Conrad, will be flying to Geneva Airport accompanied by two bodyguards: Spectrum Captains Scarlet and Blue. The Mysterons have threatened to sabotage the conference.

During a pre-flight stay at the Adelphi Hotel, Scarlet and Blue encounter two journalists, Harry and Joe, whose editor is desperate for news stories. Recognising Conrad and sensing a scoop, Harry and Joe follow the Spectrum party to Novena Airport and try to book seats on Flight 104, which will be carrying Conrad, Scarlet and Blue to Geneva. Spectrum has anonymously booked all of the seats to ensure that the trio will be travelling alone. However, Scarlet and Blue ask the airport authorities to admit the journalists to prevent Conrad's movements from being published.

Shortly after Flight 104 takes off, its crew are found unconscious in a storage room. It is discovered that they were drugged by Captain Black and that the airliner is under Mysteron control. On Cloudbase, Colonel White orders the launch of the Angel squadron, who intercept Flight 104 over the Alps. Seeing the empty cockpit, the Angels emit warning smoke to alert Scarlet and Blue. After gaining entry to the cockpit by shooting out the door, the officers discover that Flight 104 is nosediving into the Alps. However, the electricity from a power station breaks the Mysterons' hold on the airliner, and Scarlet and Blue are able to pull out of the dive before they crash into a mountain.

Flight 104 makes its final approach to Geneva, piloted by Scarlet and Blue. However, one of Blue's bullets has damaged the circuit that operates the landing gear, which fails to deploy. Ordering Blue and the others to the back of the plane, Scarlet makes a successful crash landing but is killed when the front of the plane collides with a bunker. Aware of Scarlet's retro-metabolic powers, Blue assures Harry and Joe that the officer is all right.

== Regular voice cast ==
- Ed Bishop as Captain Blue
- Cy Grant as Lieutenant Green
- Donald Gray as Colonel White and the Mysterons
- Francis Matthews as Captain Scarlet
- Liz Morgan as Destiny Angel
- Jeremy Wilkin as Captain Ochre

== Production ==
The subplot of the planned return to Mars is continued in "Noose of Ice", in which a new Earth space fleet is under construction. Although "Noose of Ice" was originally broadcast after "Flight 104", distributor ITC Entertainment's official running order places it before this episode, disrupting the series continuity.

The episode's on-screen title, rendered in the series' regular Microgramma font, reads "Flight I04" with a letter "I" substituting for the "1". This change was made as it was thought that Microgramma "1"s looked too similar to "7"s and that rendering "104" entirely in numerals would confuse viewers. The title of the earlier episode "Crater 101" also uses "I"s in place of "1"s.

The miniature model representing Geneva Airport first appeared as New York Central Airport in the Thunderbirds episode "The Duchess Assignment". The shot of the airport crash tenders moving into position is stock footage originally filmed for "Trapped in the Sky", the first episode of Thunderbirds. The incidental music that accompanies the scene of Flight 104's near miss with the mountain was originally composed for Stingray. The episode also recycles music from Supercar and Thunderbirds.

== Reception ==
Anthony Clark of sci-fi-online.com criticises the pace of the episode, describing "Flight 104" as "torpid".

According to writer Fred McNamara, the episode's "subdued, almost casual tone", which he regards as blending humour with spy themes, "brings a warm, approachable atmosphere to its intimate, neatly unfolding story." He describes scenes in which Joe secretly photographs Scarlet, only for the captain to show up as a black silhouette on the developed image, as "The Man from U.N.C.L.E.‑esque" in their absurdity. However, he also considers the episode's "languid" flavour to be a downside as well as a strength, arguing that the set-up "really feels as though it should gain more focus" and that most of the aerial tension lies in close-up shots of Scarlet and Blue's "sweat-laden faces". McNamara also expresses disappointment that the plot point of the secret conference is not developed in later episodes, though he notes that "Noose of Ice" may serve as an indirect continuation. He concludes that the episode "doesn't rely on death-defying action to constitute effective viewing, but rather digs deeper for that ever-reliable tactic that Captain Scarlet and the Mysterons used so liberally – gently crafting an uneasy atmosphere that builds on speculative horror."
