= White as Snow (Captain Scarlet and the Mysterons) =

- Captain Scarlet and the Mysterons episode
- Episode no.: Episode 8
- Directed by: Robert Lynn
- Written by: Peter Curran; David Williams
- Cinematography by: Julien Lugrin
- Editing by: Harry MacDonald
- Production code: SCA 8
- Original air date: 3 November 1967

Guest character voices
- Gary Files (uncredited) as DJ Bob Lynn and Ensign Soames; Martin King (uncredited) as the TVR-17 controller; Paul Maxwell as the USS Panther II captain; Charles Tingwell as Lieutenant Belmont; Jeremy Wilkin as the helijet pilot

Episode chronology
← Previous "Renegade Rocket"	Next → "Seek and Destroy"

"White as Snow" is the eighth episode of Captain Scarlet and the Mysterons, a British Supermarionation television series created by Gerry and Sylvia Anderson and filmed by their production company Century 21 Productions. Written by Peter Curran and David Williams and directed by Robert Lynn, it was first broadcast on 3 November 1967 on ATV Midlands.

Set in 2068, the series depicts a "war of nerves" between Earth and the Mysterons: a hostile race of Martians with the power to create functioning copies of destroyed people or objects and use them to carry out acts of aggression against humanity. Earth is defended by a military organisation called Spectrum, whose top agent, Captain Scarlet, was murdered by the Mysterons and replaced by a reconstruction that later broke free of their control. Scarlet's double has a self-healing power that enables him to recover from injuries that would be fatal to anyone else, making him Spectrum's best asset in its fight against the Mysterons.

In "White as Snow", the Mysterons, announcing that they intend to assassinate Colonel White, almost succeed in crashing a reconstructed space satellite into Cloudbase. They make another attempt on White's life when he goes into hiding on board a navy submarine.

== Plot ==
Communications satellite TVR-17 is destroyed after Captain Black infiltrates ground control and alters the spacecraft's flight path, causing it to prematurely re-enter the atmosphere and blow up. Re-creating TVR-17 and its crew, the Mysterons lock the satellite on a collision course with Cloudbase. It is shot down by Symphony Angel on the orders of Colonel White despite the protests of Captain Scarlet, who questions whether the satellite was really under Mysteron control.

When the Mysterons threaten to assassinate him, White realises that TVR-17's run at Cloudbase was targeted at him personally and decides to leave the base to protect its personnel. He appoints Captain Blue acting base commander when Scarlet, still indignant at White's decision to destroy the satellite, refuses the role. After White departs, the wreckage of the original TVR-17 is discovered and Scarlet, realising that he was wrong, regrets his earlier behaviour. He asks Lieutenant Green if he knows White's destination, but Green replies that he has been ordered to remain silent.

Posing as a deep-sea fisherman called Robert Snow, White takes up quarters on the World Navy submarine USS Panther II. As the submarine moves out to sea and prepares to dive, Ensign Soames gets his foot caught in a chain on the open deck and drowns as the Panther II submerges. Soames' Mysteron replacement is made White's steward and enters the colonel's cabin with a gun. After a struggle, he fatally shoots the occupant, but with a last effort his victim returns fire and guns down Soames. It is then discovered the man in the cabin is not White, who is found tied up and gagged in a storage locker, but Scarlet, who was killed while disguised as the colonel.

Back on Cloudbase, the revived Scarlet tells White that he pulled rank on Green to obtain the colonel's whereabouts, used his Spectrum ID to get through navy security and stowed away on the submarine before it left its base. White sentences Scarlet to death for gross insubordination but immediately grants him a reprieve, ruefully noting that the captain's indestructibility would make his execution pointless.

== Regular voice cast ==
- Ed Bishop as Captain Blue
- Cy Grant as Lieutenant Green
- Donald Gray as Colonel White and the Mysterons
- Janna Hill as Symphony Angel
- Francis Matthews as Captain Scarlet
- Liz Morgan as Destiny, Rhapsody and Harmony Angels

== Production ==
Filming of the episode began on 6 March 1967.

The TVR-17 scale model was designed by Mike Trim. As an in-joke, the satellite's resident DJ, Bob Lynn, was named after the episode's director, Robert Lynn. As scripted, the episode would have begun with the Mysterons simply taking control of TVR-17 remotely. The scenes of Captain Black hi-jacking ground control and causing the satellite to burn up were added after the first cut of the episode was found to be too short. The puppet-sized ground control room and TVR-17 communications room, both of which were specially designed for this additional material, were built at opposite ends of the same puppet set. The computer props that in the background of the set were originally made for the Thunderbirds episode "Ricochet".

The tune being played by TVR-17 was written by series composer Barry Gray and also titled "White as Snow". It was recorded with the episode's other incidental music on 28 May 1967 in a four-hour studio session attended by a 14-member band. Featuring a Hammond organ that was played by Gray himself, "White as Snow" can also be heard in the later Captain Scarlet episode "Special Assignment" as well as various episodes of Joe 90 and The Secret Service. A commercial version of the tune was included on the CD release of the Captain Scarlet soundtrack.

The scale model representing the USS Panther II was originally made for the Thunderbirds episode "Atlantic Inferno", while the helijet that transfers White to the submarine was first seen in "30 Minutes After Noon". The helijet's puppet-sized cockpit appeared in various episodes of Thunderbirds. In a continuity error, the Mysteron reconstruction of Soames is shown armed with different handguns between shots as he makes his way to White's quarters on the Panther II.

== Reception ==
Paul Cornell, Martin Day and Keith Topping, authors of The Guinness Book of Classic British TV, praise "White as Snow" for its depiction of "Scarlet [losing] faith in Colonel White", naming the episode one of "the finest pieces in the Anderson canon". Chris Drake and Graeme Bassett note the comic depiction of Captain Blue, who makes the most of his stint as commander of Cloudbase by scheduling pointless science lectures and having the Angel squadron conduct unnecessary target practice.

James Stansfield of Den of Geek considers "White as Snow" the third-best episode of the series, also arguing that Blue's "humorous tenure" as White's replacement helps to make it "probably the funniest" instalment. He applauds the tension between Scarlet and White, noting that as "White as Snow" is one of the series' earlier episodes, this is "one of the first times we see the different personalities in Spectrum come out". Fred McNamara writes that the episode places "character-driven drama" above "spectacle-driven adventure" and believes that the conflict between Scarlet and White provides the "essence of its lasting appeal". He praises its "well-placed moments of comedy" but argues that the gunfight between Scarlet and the reconstructed Soames underlines the limitations of the puppets, while the "bizarre finale shows that the writers perhaps didn't quite know how to wrap up the story."

In his review of the Captain Scarlet soundtrack CD, Andrew Pixley of TV Zone magazine names Barry Gray's "White as Snow" as one of two standout tracks. Andrew Thomas of Dreamwatch magazine believes that Soames' drowning is one of many moments in Captain Scarlet to portray a level of violence that is "graphic, even shocking ... for a children's show".
