= Special Assignment (Captain Scarlet and the Mysterons) =

- Captain Scarlet and the Mysterons episode
- Episode no.: Episode 14
- Directed by: Robert Lynn
- Written by: Tony Barwick
- Cinematography by: Julien Lugrin
- Editing by: Harry MacDonald
- Production code: SCA 22
- Original air date: 1 December 1967

Guest character voices
- Gary Files as Kramer, Casino Croupier & Nuclear City Security Chief; Martin King as Steele & Garage Attendant; Shane Rimmer (uncredited) as Mason; Jeremy Wilkin as Bartender

Episode chronology
← Previous "The Trap"	Next → "Lunarville 7"

"Special Assignment" is the fourteenth episode of Captain Scarlet and the Mysterons, a British Supermarionation television series created by Gerry and Sylvia Anderson and filmed by their production company Century 21 Productions. Written by Tony Barwick and directed by Robert Lynn, it was first broadcast on 1 December 1967 on ATV Midlands.

Set in 2068, the series depicts a "war of nerves" between Earth and the Mysterons: a race of Martians with the power to create functioning copies of destroyed people or objects and use them to carry out acts of aggression against humanity. Earth is defended by a military organisation called Spectrum, whose top agent, Captain Scarlet, was killed by the Mysterons and replaced by a reconstruction that subsequently broke free of their control. Scarlet's double has a self-healing power that enables him to recover from injuries that would be fatal to anyone else, making him Spectrum's best asset in its fight against the Mysterons.

In "Special Assignment", the Mysterons threaten to destroy the whole of North America. Shortly after, Scarlet, who has been dismissed from Spectrum for gambling while on duty, is seemingly blackmailed into betraying the organisation.

== Plot ==
Driving a car, Captain Black murders a filling station attendant called Mason by running him over. The Mysterons create a replica of Mason under their control. Later, con artists Steele and Kramer pull in to have their car's brakes serviced. Instead of topping up their brake fluid, the reconstructed Mason drains it. Back on the road, Steele and Kramer are unable to stop at a cliff edge and are killed when they crash onto the slope below. They are then replicated by the Mysterons, who transmit a message to Earth vowing to destroy the whole of North America.

After meeting with Colonel White regarding a "special assignment" concerning the Mysterons' threat, Captain Scarlet visits a casino and, with uncharacteristic poor judgement, ends up losing $5,000 on roulette. When he is unable to pay his debt, the casino informs Spectrum and Scarlet is dismissed from the organisation. Broke, Scarlet moves into an Arizona hotel. He is soon approached by the reconstructions of Steele and Kramer, who offer to write off his debt in exchange for a Spectrum Pursuit Vehicle. Agreeing to this proposal, Scarlet learns that the men intend to use the SPV to attack Nuclear City, Nevada. Their aim is to detonate a nuclear device within the city, creating a chain reaction powerful enough to obliterate the North American continent.

Concerned by Scarlet's recent behaviour, Captain Blue goes AWOL from Cloudbase to track down his friend. When Blue arrives at the desert ranch house where the Mysteron agents are unveiling their plan, Scarlet appears to shoot Blue dead to reassure his new allies that he is on their side. However, he has fired nothing more than a tranquilliser dart and Blue regains consciousness after the others leave to steal an SPV from a nearby garage. He is radioed by a furious White, who informs him that Scarlet has been working undercover to infiltrate and sabotage the Mysterons' plot. From a map left at the ranch house, Blue learns of the threat to Nuclear City and relays this information to White.

The Angels are launched and intercept Scarlet and the Mysteron agents as they speed to Nuclear City in the SPV. Scarlet activates a smoke signal instructing the Angels to attack the vehicle. Realising that he and Kramer have been betrayed, Steele fatally shoots Scarlet, but the captain ejects before the SPV is destroyed, killing Steele and Kramer and saving Nuclear City. Later, the revived Scarlet is joined by Blue, White and Lieutenant Green for an off-duty night at the casino.

== Regular voice cast ==
- Sylvia Anderson as Melody Angel
- Ed Bishop as Captain Blue
- Cy Grant as Lieutenant Green
- Donald Gray as Colonel White, Captain Black and the Mysterons
- Francis Matthews as Captain Scarlet
- Jeremy Wilkin as Captain Ochre

== Production ==
For timing reasons, several script changes were made during production. As originally scripted, the episode began with the gambling incident that sees Scarlet dismissed from Spectrum. However, as the first cut of the episode was too short, this was changed by adding several new scenes. The first of these were Steele and Kramer's deaths in a car crash and their subsequent reconstruction by the Mysterons (the crash being presented as an accident rather than the result of sabotage), followed by Colonel White addressing Cloudbase personnel after the Mysterons issue their threat. Later, as the episode was still under time, Captain Black's murder of Mason and the reconstructed Mason's sabotage of Steele and Kramer's car were also added.

The script describes Nuclear City as housing all of North America's nuclear weapons and radioactive materials; however, this is not conveyed in the finished episode. The Mysteron threat as stated in the finished episode is truncated from the scripted version, in which the Mysterons specifically vow to destroy North America within seven days.

The casino set incorporated props that had previously appeared as part of the Creighton-Ward Mansion dining room in Thunderbirds. The miniature roulette props were parts of a toy set produced by Merit Toys and had previously appeared in the Thunderbirds episode "The Duchess Assignment". The ranch house scale model was a modified version of the hunting lodge seen in "Spectrum Strikes Back".

All music in "Special Assignment" is taken from earlier episodes. One of the recycled tracks is "White as Snow", which was originally composed for the episode of the same name and can be heard during the scene of Mason's murder. The music accompanying the closing scene was originally composed for the Thunderbirds episode "30 Minutes After Noon".

Although the script states that Blue travels to the ranch house in a Spectrum Patrol Car, the model shot shows him driving an unmarked car. The fate of the Mysteron reconstruction of Mason is not shown.

"Special Assignment" is one of only a few episodes of Captain Scarlet in which Colonel White is seen away from Cloudbase. The only other episodes in which he is shown to leave the base are "White as Snow", "Spectrum Strikes Back" and "Flight to Atlantica".

== Reception ==
Chris Drake and Graeme Bassett noted the unusual nature of the plot, writing that it "contains more than one red herring". Andrew Pixley and Julie Rogers of Starburst magazine considered Black's murder of Mason, accomplished by running the attendant over with his car, to be one of the series' more violent moments, adding that Black kills another filling station worker in "Manhunt" by crushing him with a car lift.

In his book, Spectrum Is Indestructible, Fred McNamara criticised the episode's "clumsy, scrambling premise" and "bizarre" structure, commenting: "So much of it is stitched together so loosely. Everything in its set-up feels like it's in the wrong order, or that there's entire chunks of plot missing." He questioned the logic of the Mysterons' methods, noting that while the purpose of the reconstructed Kramer and Steele seems to be to recruit Scarlet, the aliens murder the original conmen before Scarlet is dismissed from Spectrum ("They had no way of knowing Captain Scarlet would fall right into their hands, so had Spectrum kept their plan hush-hush for a later date, what exactly would the Mysterons' plan have entailed?") Despite this, McNamara also considered the episode to be "full of visual strengths" and engaging "human aspects", praising the "harrowing sight" of the SPV being targeted by the Angel squadron as well as Ed Bishop and Francis Matthews's "crisp, stirring" voice acting during the scenes of the concerned Blue's search for his friend. He also admired scriptwriter Tony Barwick's skill in "playfully twisting Cold War motifs" as Spectrum and the Mysterons try to outwit each other and Scarlet apparently defects. He concluded that "[s]ometimes it's best to just let go of the madness and embrace the episode for what is – a lovely bit of Cold War-inspired trickery." In a later article, he ranked "Special Assignment" among the best episodes of Captain Scarlet, calling it "a delightfully subversive entry in the series" and commenting that "there's a noir-ish imagery in seeing Captain Scarlet, now just plain old Paul Metcalfe, reduced to being a lone wolf, skulking around dive bars and even betraying his closest friend, Captain Blue."
