= Treble Cross =

- Captain Scarlet and the Mysterons episode
- Episode no.: Episode 24
- Directed by: Alan Perry
- Written by: Tony Barwick
- Cinematography by: Ted Catford
- Editing by: John Beaton
- Production code: SCA 27
- Original air date: 23 February 1968

Guest character voices
- Gary Files as Slaton Airbase Sergeant; David Healy as Dr Edward Mitchell; Martin King as Dr Paul Baxter; Liz Morgan as Slaton Hospital Nurse; Jeremy Wilkin as Major Gravener

Episode chronology
| ← Previous "Noose of Ice" | Next → "Inferno" |

"Treble Cross" is the 24th episode of Captain Scarlet and the Mysterons, a British Supermarionation television series created by Gerry and Sylvia Anderson and produced by their company Century 21 Productions. Written by Tony Barwick and directed by Alan Perry, it was first broadcast on 23 February 1968 on ATV Midlands.

Set in 2068, the series depicts a "war of nerves" between Earth and the Mysterons: a hostile race of Martians with the power to create functioning copies of destroyed people or objects and use them to carry out acts of aggression against humanity. Earth is defended by a military organisation called Spectrum, whose top agent, Captain Scarlet, was murdered by the Mysterons and replaced by a reconstruction that later broke free of their control. Scarlet's double has a self-healing power that enables him to recover from injuries that would be fatal to anyone else, making him Spectrum's best asset in its fight against the Mysterons.

In "Treble Cross", the Mysterons' primary agent on Earth, Captain Black, engineers the death and reconstruction of a test pilot as part of a plot to destroy the world capital, Futura City. However, his victim is revived and with Spectrum's help impersonates his Mysteron replacement in an attempt to capture Black.

== Plot ==
World Air Force test pilot Major Gravener is being driven to Slaton Airbase by car when Captain Black, driving a truck from the opposite direction, deploys a beam with false headlamps into the road to dazzle Gravener's chauffeur, Harris. To avoid a collision, Harris swerves the car into a lake and both men drown. The clinically-dead Gravener is discovered by two passing doctors and taken to Slaton Hospital, where he is revived with the aid of a stasis and recovery unit.

The next day, a Mysteron reconstruction of Gravener travels to Slaton Airbase and commandeers an XK-107 bomber armed with a nuclear warhead. When word arrives of Gravener's accident, the base personnel realise that the pilot is an impostor and block the runway just as he is taking off. The XK-107 crashes and explodes, killing the reconstructed Gravener. Spectrum connects the attempted theft of the XK-107 to a Mysteron threat to destroy the world capital, Futura City.

Briefed by Captains Scarlet and Blue, the original Gravener takes off in a second XK-107 in an attempt to trick the Mysterons into thinking that he is their reconstruction. As hoped, Captain Black contacts the aircraft: he instructs Gravener to land at the disused Weston Airstrip, 30 miles outside Futura City. Scarlet deduces that the purpose of this rendezvous is to transfer the warhead to a ground vehicle, after which Gravener will depart in the XK-107 and fly it as a decoy while the warhead is driven into Futura City and detonated. Black's truck is shown to be standing by at the airstrip.

As Gravener comes in to land, Spectrum ground forces, led by Scarlet and Blue in a Spectrum Patrol Car, converge on the airstrip to capture Black. The truck attempts to escape but in veering out of Gravener's path ends up crashing into a bunker. However, Scarlet, Blue and Gravener are shocked to find that the vehicle's dead driver is not Black, but a Mysteron reconstruction of Harris. Blue concludes that although the Mysterons were unable to distinguish the two Graveners, Black possesses a "sixth sense" that warns him of danger and has enabled him to evade Spectrum once again.

== Regular voice cast ==
- Ed Bishop as Captain Blue
- Cy Grant as Lieutenant Green
- Donald Gray as Colonel White, Captain Black and the Mysterons
- Francis Matthews as Captain Scarlet
- Liz Morgan as Destiny Angel

== Production ==
"Treble Cross" is one of several Captain Scarlet scripts by Tony Barwick that include a mention of 10 July. Barwick liked to insert references to this date as it was his birthday, which has led fans of Captain Scarlet to observe 10 July as "Captain Scarlet Day". The episode was filmed over two weeks in September 1967, during which time Century 21 began pre-production of its next Supermarionation series, Joe 90.

The scale model representing Slaton Hospital previously appeared as a laboratory in "Place of Angels". To increase the realism of Major Gravener's resuscitation, the puppet's torso was fitted with a bag into which air was pumped to make it appear that the character's chest is rising and falling. The shots showing the Spectrum forces converging on Weston Airstrip were originally filmed for "Manhunt", another episode in which Spectrum attempts to apprehend Captain Black.

== Reception ==
Anthony Clark of sci-fi-online.com considered the premise "more interesting" than that of "Fire at Rig 15" but believed the overall episode to be "a little slow". Shane M. Dallmann of Video Watchdog magazine called the episode "less amusing but far more intelligent" than "Flight to Atlantica".

Fred McNamara praised the episode, commending its "confident, propulsive" narrative and "disarmingly simple" execution. He commented that although "Treble Cross" takes the series outside its "comfort zone", the episode "[keeps] its feet firmly on the ground, with plenty of mystery, intrigue and action along the way." He also remarked that "a particular joy to watch is seeing the Mysterons fall, and in their place, Spectrum rise." McNamara's review was not without criticisms: he stated that while the crash of the XK-107 presumably destroys the bomber's nuclear warhead, this is unclear from the "fairly compact" explosion seen on screen; he considered the discovery of the reconstructed Harris as the truck driver to be an anticlimax; and he questioned the lack of any obvious "crisis of personality" on the revived Gravener's part in response to being duplicated by the Mysterons: "The episode unfortunately doesn't allow the time for in-depth reflection of what Gravener might actually feel about having his body exploited by unseen hands and, to some degree, by Spectrum itself."

Media historian Nicholas J. Cull regarded "Treble Cross" as one of several Captain Scarlet episodes that highlight scriptwriter Tony Barwick's interest in the dangers of nuclear technology. He viewed the plot involving the attempted theft of a nuclear warhead as an example of Barwick re-using his "favourite [plot] device".
