= Point 783 =

- Captain Scarlet and the Mysterons episode
- Episode no.: Episode 5
- Directed by: Robert Lynn
- Written by: Peter Curran; David Williams
- Cinematography by: Julien Lugrin
- Editing by: Bob Dearberg
- Production code: SCA 5
- Original air date: 22 December 1967

Guest character voices
- David Healy (uncredited) as Major Brooks and General Cope; Martin King (uncredited) as the MCA tanker driver's mate and a desert merchant; Paul Maxwell as the Supreme Commander; Charles Tingwell as Captain Hassel and Pete (MCA tanker driver); Jeremy Wilkin as Colonel Storm and a security machine

Episode chronology
← Previous "Manhunt"	Next → "Operation Time"

"Point 783" is the fifth episode of Captain Scarlet and the Mysterons, a British Supermarionation television series created by Gerry and Sylvia Anderson and filmed by their production company Century 21 Productions. Written by Peter Curran and David Williams and directed by Robert Lynn, it was first broadcast on 22 December 1967 on ATV Midlands.

Set in 2068, the series depicts a "war of nerves" between Earth and the Mysterons: a hostile race of Martians with the power to create functioning copies of destroyed people or objects and use them to carry out acts of aggression against humanity. Earth is defended by a military organisation called Spectrum, whose top agent, Captain Scarlet, was murdered by the Mysterons and replaced by a reconstruction that later broke free of their control. Scarlet's double has a self-healing power that enables him to recover from injuries that would be fatal to anyone else, making him Spectrum's best asset in its fight against the Mysterons.

In "Point 783", the Mysterons take control of an experimental super-tank in an attempt to assassinate the Supreme Commander of Earth Forces.

== Plot ==
The episode begins with military personnel carrying out a test of the most advanced military robot ever built: the Unitron, a heavily-armoured, unmanned super-tank. It can be remotely controlled by a human operator or programmed to attack a designated target until the target is completely destroyed.

In a transmission to Earth, the Mysterons warn Spectrum that they intend to assassinate the Supreme Commander of Earth Forces. Spectrum commander-in-chief Colonel White (voiced by Donald Gray) assigns Captains Scarlet and Blue to protect the Commander. Elsewhere, two Earth Forces officers, Colonel Storm and Major Brooks, are killed in a car crash and reconstructed by the Mysterons to carry out the threat. At the Supreme Headquarters Earth Forces (SHEF) building in New York, the Commander, joined by Scarlet, Blue and the reconstructed Brooks, chairs a press conference unveiling the Unitron. Brooks is turned into a living bomb and explodes; however, the attempt on the Commander's life is foiled by Scarlet, who has a "sixth sense" for Mysteron activity and deploys blast shields that protect the Commander, Blue and himself from the detonation.

Later, Blue drives the Commander to Point 783, a blockhouse on the Unitron's test range in the Sahara, to view the weapon in action. Also in attendance is the reconstructed Storm. Initially the demonstration proceeds according to plan, but when the Commander steps outside the blockhouse, the Unitron stops firing on its programmed targets and turns its weapons on Point 783 itself. Air strikes by the Spectrum Angel squadron fail to stop the Unitron, which remains virtually undamaged.

After requisitioning a Spectrum Pursuit Vehicle from a bazaar, Scarlet races to Point 783 and extracts the Commander and Storm while Blue remains behind with the blockhouse personnel. However, moments before the blockhouse is completely destroyed, the Unitron ceases its attack and moves off in pursuit of the SPV. Unknown to the Spectrum and military personnel, Storm has re-programmed the Unitron – and its new target is not Point 783, but Storm himself. Inside the SPV, Storm produces a handgun and shoots Scarlet, but the wounded captain manages to eject himself and the Commander to safety. The Unitron continues chasing the SPV with Storm inside until both vehicles are destroyed when they plunge off a cliff edge and crash into a canyon below. At the end of the episode, Blue assures the Commander and the Point 783 personnel that despite his fatal injuries, Scarlet will return to fight the Mysterons again.

== Regular voice cast ==
- Sylvia Anderson as Melody Angel
- Ed Bishop as Captain Blue
- Cy Grant as Lieutenant Green
- Donald Gray as Colonel White, Captain Black and the Mysterons
- Francis Matthews as Captain Scarlet
- Liz Morgan as Destiny Angel and Harmony Angel

== Production ==
The Unitron was designed by Century 21 special effects director Derek Meddings. "Point 783" was the first episode of Captain Scarlet to be directed by Robert Lynn, who had previously directed several films. It was Lynn's first time working with puppets. The episode was filmed in February 1967.

As originally scripted, the episode would have begun with the deaths of the original Colonel Storm and Major Brooks. However, as the first cut was too short, the episode was extended by adding a new opening scene which introduces the Unitron. This scene's effects shots were a re‑use of footage from the scenes of the Unitron demonstration that takes place later in the episode.

The incidental music was recorded on 30 April 1967 in a four-hour studio session attended by 14 instrumentalists. It includes a piece titled "The SHEF March", which accompanies the scenes of the Supreme Commander arriving at SHEF Headquarters. The march can also be heard several later Supermarionation productions, including the Joe 90 episode "Business Holiday".

== Reception ==
James Stansfield of Den of Geek considers "Point 783" the ninth-best episode of Captain Scarlet, praising the "unique threat" posed by the Unitron and Storm as well as the episode's "good dummy threat" in the form of the exploding Brooks. Writer Fred McNamara believes the episode to be well paced with "compelling set pieces" and "full-throttle action". However, he argues that this is to the detriment of the writing, stating that the episode is so focused on a theme of technological advancement "that it almost forgets that it has characters to attend to." He also calls the Unitron a "less than subtle" symbol of mechanised warfare. Nevertheless, he expresses satisfaction with the finale, writing that the "climactic chase" between the runaway SPV and the re-programmed Unitron "just about makes the episode worth the surface-level characters and gory war politics."

In a review for Andersonic, Vincent Law interprets the episode as a negative commentary on progress in automation and mechanisation. He compares it to "Recall to Service", an episode of the Andersons' later series The Secret Service about a malfunctioning super-tank called the AquaTank. He also finds the plot similar to that of the Star Trek episode "The Ultimate Computer" (1968), in which a rogue computer takes control of the USS Enterprise. Law views "Point 783" as "quite a bloodthirsty instalment" of Captain Scarlet, partly because of the violent demises of the original Storm and Brooks: while driving their car through a tunnel, they collide with a methane tanker travelling in the opposite direction. He regards this particular aspect of the Mysterons' plan as confusing, noting that the tanker's only purpose in the story is to bring about these two deaths: "... it appears that [the Mysterons have] reconstructed the tanker driver, whom they use to kill the two officers in a crash, both of whom are then re-created to do the assassinating. Just a tad long-winded." He also states that the explosion of the reconstructed Brooks reinforces the "very alien" nature of the Mysterons, likening this self-destruct ability to the tactics used by World War II Kamikaze pilots. Law regards the special effects as the highlight: he describes the Angels' aerial bombardment of the Unitron as "what Century 21 is, in a nutshell – fast editing, great music, big explosions and unrelenting action." He sums up "Point 783" as "a snapshot of what Captain Scarlet is all about" as well as "visually and technically impressive, loud and exciting, yet perhaps just a tad flawed at script level".

Chris Bentley, an author of episode guides for the Anderson productions, views "Recall to Service" as a remake of "Point 783". Andrew Pixley and Julie Rogers of Starburst magazine regard the explosion of Brooks as one of the series' most violent moments.
