= Manhunt (Captain Scarlet and the Mysterons) =

- Captain Scarlet and the Mysterons episode
- Episode no.: Episode 4
- Directed by: Alan Perry
- Written by: Tony Barwick
- Cinematography by: Paddy Seale
- Editing by: Harry MacDonald
- Production code: SCA 4
- Original air date: 20 October 1967

Guest character voices
- David Healy (uncredited) as a Geiger Counter Operator and the 3rd security guard; Martin King (uncredited) as Security Chief Richards and the Mechanic; Paul Maxwell as the 1st security guard; Charles Tingwell as Security Guard Harris; Jeremy Wilkin as the 2nd security guard

Episode chronology
| ← Previous "Big Ben Strikes Again" | Next → "Point 783" |

"Manhunt" is the fourth episode of Captain Scarlet and the Mysterons, a British Supermarionation television series created by Gerry and Sylvia Anderson and produced by their company Century 21 Productions. Written by Tony Barwick and directed by Alan Perry, it was first broadcast on 20 October 1967 on ATV Midlands.

Set in 2068, the series depicts a "war of nerves" between Earth and the Mysterons: a race of Martians with the power to create functioning copies of destroyed people or objects and use them to carry out acts of aggression against humanity. Earth is defended by a military organisation called Spectrum, whose top agent, Captain Scarlet, was killed by the Mysterons and replaced by a reconstruction that subsequently broke free of their control. Scarlet's double has a self-healing power that enables him to recover from injuries that would be fatal to anyone else, making him Spectrum's best asset in its fight against the Mysterons.

In this episode, Spectrum launch a manhunt for Captain Black after he breaks into a nuclear installation and becomes radioactive.

== Plot ==
Captain Black breaks into the Culver Atomic Centre for unknown reasons, but is discovered by security guards. While making his escape he is forced to enter a radioactive area, where he is exposed to an isotope that renders him detectable on long-range Geiger counters for the next 48 hours. In a bid to capture the Mysteron agent, Spectrum search the surrounding area using a fleet of Detector Trucks aided by the Angel fighter squadron.

Trapped inside the search area, Black murders a filling station mechanic to steal the hidden Spectrum Pursuit Vehicle that he is guarding. When Captains Scarlet and Blue arrive to requisition the SPV, they encounter the Mysteron reconstruction of the mechanic, who pulls a gun on them but is shot dead by Scarlet. The Detector Trucks pick up Black's trace as he speeds down a highway in the SPV. Captain Ochre sets up a roadblock to stop him. However, the Mysterons warn Black and order him to return to the Atomic Centre, where the background radiation will make him undetectable to Spectrum. Following tyre tracks, Scarlet and Blue find Symphony's landed Angel Interceptor but no sign of the pilot, realising she has been captured by Black.

The Spectrum forces converge on the Atomic Centre. Inside, Black seemingly attempts to kill Symphony by exposing her to increasing levels of radiation, but ultimately chooses to spare her life. The SPV then crashes the gates of the Atomic Centre and heads south. Picking up the radioactive signature of the driver and assuming it is Captain Black, the Spectrum forces begin a pursuit. The SPV crashes at a roadblock, and the driver is discovered to be Symphony. With the complex left unguarded, Black decontaminates himself and slips away, Spectrum realising too late that they have been tricked. After Colonel White's debriefing, Lieutenant Green discreetly asks Symphony why she did not stop the SPV outside the gates of the Atomic Centre; she meekly admits that she had never driven an SPV before.

== Regular voice cast ==
- Ed Bishop as Captain Blue
- Cy Grant as Lieutenant Green
- Donald Gray as Colonel White, Captain Black and the Mysterons
- Janna Hill as Symphony Angel
- Francis Matthews as Captain Scarlet
- Paul Maxwell as Captain Grey
- Jeremy Wilkin as Captain Ochre

== Production ==
The Spectrum detector truck models were designed by special effects assistant Mike Trim. The puppet-scale truck interior was a re-dress of the Zero-X MEV cockpit set that was originally built for the film Thunderbirds Are Go (1966) and last seen in Captain Scarlet's first episode, "The Mysterons". "Manhunt" marks the first contributions of voice actor David Healy to Captain Scarlet, here providing the voices of a Spectrum Geiger counter operator and one of the Culver Atomic Centre security guards.

During the scene of the garage mechanic's murder by Captain Black, the mechanic's radio plays the theme music for the film Crossroads to Crime (1960), directed by Gerry Anderson. The incidental music for "Manhunt" was recorded during a four-hour studio session held on 16 April 1967 with a group of 14 instrumentalists. The suite runs to four minutes and seven seconds. Music for "Big Ben Strikes Again" was recorded during the same session.

Spectrum makes a second attempt to apprehend Captain Black in "Treble Cross", which re-uses the scale model footage of the detector trucks recorded for "Manhunt".

== Reception ==
Paul Cornell, Martin Day and Keith Topping, authors of The Guinness Book of Classic British TV, consider "Manhunt" to be one of several Captain Scarlet episodes that "seem little more than left-over Thunderbirds scripts". Andrew Pixley and Julie Rogers of Starburst magazine regard Black's murder of the mechanic as one of the series' more violent moments, noting that Black also kills a filling station worker in "Special Assignment".

Writer Fred McNamara calls the episode a "rather limp affair" which despite an exciting premise, lacks "definite payoff". Among McNamara's criticisms are the episode's failure to significantly develop Black's character, adequately explain his motivation for sparing Symphony Angel, and even reveal why the Mysteron agent is so interested in the Culver Atomic Centre in the first place. McNamara also considers Spectrum's final pursuit of the SPV to be the series' weakest vehicle chase. Suggesting that the episode would have had more of an impact if it had been postponed to later in the run, McNamara concludes that "Manhunt" represents the "first genuine blunder" of the series.
