= Seek and Destroy (Captain Scarlet and the Mysterons) =

- Captain Scarlet and the Mysterons episode
- Episode no.: Episode 9
- Directed by: Alan Perry
- Written by: Peter Curran & David Williams
- Cinematography by: Paddy Seale
- Editing by: John Beaton
- Production code: SCA 11
- Original air date: 5 January 1968

Guest character voices
- Paul Maxwell as Fire Chief; Charles Tingwell as Fairfield; Jeremy Wilkin as Jackson

Episode chronology
← Previous "White as Snow"	Next → "Spectrum Strikes Back"

"Seek and Destroy" is the ninth episode of Captain Scarlet and the Mysterons, a 1960s British Supermarionation television series created by Gerry and Sylvia Anderson and produced by their company Century 21 Productions. The ninth episode of the series to be produced, it was written by Peter Curran and David Williams and first broadcast on 5 January 1968 on ATV Midlands.

Set in 2068, the series depicts a "war of nerves" between Earth and the Mysterons: a race of Martians with the power to create functioning copies of destroyed people or objects and use them to carry out acts of aggression against humanity. Earth is defended by a military organisation called Spectrum, whose top agent, Captain Scarlet, was killed by the Mysterons and replaced by a reconstruction that subsequently broke free of their control. Scarlet's double has a self-healing power that enables him to recover from injuries that would be fatal to anyone else, making him Spectrum's best asset in its fight against the Mysterons.

In "Seek and Destroy", a Mysteron threat to kill one of the Spectrum Angel pilots leads to the squadron doing battle with a trio of reconstructed Angel fighters. "Seek and Destroy" has been praised for its aerial shots and other special effects sequences. It is one of four Captain Scarlet episodes that were later re-edited and combined to create Captain Scarlet vs. the Mysterons (1980), a made-for-TV Captain Scarlet compilation film produced by the New York office of distributor ITC Entertainment.

== Plot ==
Captain Black intercepts a transporter truck delivering a shipment from the Fairfield Engine Company to a warehouse. After shooting the driver, Jackson, he starts a fire that quickly consumes the warehouse and everything inside. Later, while surveying the wreckage with a fire chief, Mr Fairfield reveals that his company's shipments were newly fitted-out (though unpainted) Spectrum Angel fighters awaiting delivery to Cloudbase. At that moment, the ruins of the warehouse are overflown by three aircraft matching those destroyed in the fire.

Meanwhile, the Mysterons have warned Spectrum that they intend to kill one of the Angel pilots. Destiny Angel has left Cloudbase to take a holiday in Paris, and as she is the only member of the squadron currently away, Colonel White believes her to be in the most danger. With communications officer Lieutenant Green unable to reach Destiny at her hotel, White has Captains Scarlet and Blue fly to Paris to bring her back to Cloudbase. Scarlet and Blue find Destiny at a café and all three leave for the airport in a Spectrum Patrol Car, only to be ambushed on a country road by the unpiloted Mysteron reconstructions of the destroyed Angel fighters. Cloudbase is alerted and the real Angels, led by Melody, are dispatched to the danger zone.

As the Mysteron fighters target the SPC, forcing Scarlet, Blue and Destiny to take cover in a nearby ditch, the Angels arrive to engage the enemy in a dogfight. After shooting down one of the fighters, Harmony takes damage but safely ejects before her aircraft hits the ground. Rhapsody manages to destroy another. The last fighter is eliminated when it deliberately nosedives into the ground with Melody in pursuit. Melody pulls up before crashing. On the ground, the Mysteron attack has reduced the SPC to a smoking wreck, leading Blue to quip that it will be "a long walk to Cloudbase".

== Regular voice cast ==
- Sylvia Anderson as Melody Angel
- Ed Bishop as Captain Blue
- Cy Grant as Lieutenant Green
- Donald Gray as Colonel White, Captain Black and the Mysterons
- Francis Matthews as Captain Scarlet
- Liz Morgan as Destiny, Rhapsody and Harmony Angels

== Production ==
To reduce the strain on the Century 21 art department, which was busy with its preparations for the Thunderbirds sequel film Thunderbird 6, the production of the episode economised on set design and scale model work. The set representing Destiny Angel's Paris hotel room was re-used from "Winged Assassin", while the model of the hotel exterior was a modified form of the SHEF Headquarters Building from "Point 783". The café exterior was adapted from a set that first appeared in the Thunderbirds episode "The Perils of Penelope", while the Paris model shots featured miniature buildings that were originally built for the same episode. Jackson's truck was designed by special effects assistant Mike Trim. The script compared the truck lifting a crate containing a new Angel fighter to "Thunderbird 2 picking up a Pod".

Filming of the episode began on 8 April 1967, two weeks behind schedule, during pre-production of Thunderbird 6. According to effects director Derek Meddings, while filming the aerial sequences the effects team deliberately flew the miniature models of reconstructed Angel fighters without "human movement" to emphasise their Mysteron nature. Originally the episode was to have ended with Destiny finding that a bottle of perfume that she bought in Paris had survived the destruction of the SPC, but this scene was ultimately deleted.

One of the episode's incidental music tracks, "An Angel in Paris", is included on the 2015 Fanderson CD release of the series soundtrack.

== Reception ==
Paul Cornell, Martin Day and Keith Topping, authors of The Guinness Book of Classic British TV, consider "Seek and Destroy" to be a very well remembered episode of Captain Scarlet. Chris Drake and Graeme Bassett praise the aerial sequences, describing the episode as an "excellent showcase for the Angel aircraft, as well as providing the small 'Flying Unit' of Century 21 with an opportunity to express themselves in full." Shane M. Dallmann of Video Watchdog magazine describes the dogfight as "impressive". Chris Bentley, author of Captain Scarlet: The Vault, criticises several aspects of the set design, noting that some of the buildings and street furniture seen in the Paris driving scenes are flats rather than three-dimensional models.

Fred McNamara is critical of the episode, writing that it takes "misstep after misstep in its internal logic; plus, it's a massive killjoy." He argues that it devotes too much time to underwhelming vehicle action, describing the battle between the Angels and the Mysteronised fighters as a "plotless showcase" whose use of stock footage and "stiff, two-dimensional" photography greatly reduces its dramatic impact. McNamara also takes issue with the premise and characterisation, noting that the mystery of which Angel will be targeted is solved straight away and that the episode reveals very little of Destiny's background, despite being set in her country of origin. He also argues that the episode's focus on Destiny, the lead Angel, sidelines the rest of the squadron and therefore represents a missed opportunity for character growth. Drawing a comparison to earlier Supermarionation productions, he writes that this shows "how the widened cast of Captain Scarlet was at loggerheads with its decreased runtime."

The British Board of Film Classification rates the episode U, noting that it contains "infrequent, very mild" violence.
