= Fire at Rig 15 =

- Captain Scarlet and the Mysterons episode
- Episode no.: Episode 19
- Directed by: Ken Turner
- Written by: Bryan Cooper
- Cinematography by: Julien Lugrin
- Editing by: Harry MacDonald
- Production code: SCA 14
- Original air date: 16 February 1968

Guest character voices
- Gary Files as Charlie Hansen; David Healy as Jason Smith; Martin King as Oil Worker; Jeremy Wilkin as Kinley

Episode chronology
← Previous "Model Spy"	Next → "Flight to Atlantica"

"Fire at Rig 15" is the 19th episode of Captain Scarlet and the Mysterons, a British Supermarionation television series created by Gerry and Sylvia Anderson. Written by Bryan Cooper and directed by Ken Turner, it was first broadcast on 16 February 1968 on ATV Midlands.

Set in 2068, the series depicts a "war of nerves" between Earth and the Mysterons: a hostile race of Martians with the power to create functioning copies of destroyed people or objects and use the reconstructions to carry out specific acts of aggression against humanity. Earth is defended by a military organisation called Spectrum, whose top agent, Captain Scarlet, was murdered by the Mysterons and replaced with a reconstruction that later broke free of their control. Scarlet's double has a self-repairing ability that enables him to recover from injuries that would be fatal to any other person, making Spectrum's strongest asset in its fight against the Mysterons.

In this episode, the Mysterons attempt to immobilise the whole of Spectrum by targeting the oil refinery that supplies the fuel for its vehicles.

== Plot ==
In the oil fields of the Middle East, the Mysterons sabotage the drilling on Rig 15 by opening a safety valve, releasing a jet of oil that quickly ignites and turns the rig into an inferno. The nearby Bensheba oil refinery is the only source of fuel for the vehicles used by the Spectrum Organisation. When the Mysterons cryptically threaten to "immobilise" the whole organisation, Colonel White fears that they intend to disrupt this fuel supply and dispatches Captains Scarlet and Blue to investigate the unfolding disaster at Rig 15.

On arrival, Scarlet and Blue learn from rig controller Kinley and his assistant, Hansen, that explosives expert Jason Smith has been brought in to "blow out" the fire by detonating an explosive charge at its centre. Unknown to the Spectrum officers and rig personnel, Captain Black has been observing the blaze from a distance. During the planting of the charge, he uses the Mysterons' powers to hypnotise Smith. The charge detonates and extinguishes the fire, but Smith is killed in the explosion and replaced with a double under Mysteron control.

That night, Black orders the reconstructed Smith to leave in his truck and use his explosives to destroy the Bensheba refinery. The following morning, the body of the original Smith is discovered and Scarlet and Blue realise that he has been taken over by the Mysterons. Scarlet requisitions a Spectrum Pursuit Vehicle and chases Smith down the highway leading to Bensheba, managing to force him off the road before they reach the refinery. As Smith's truck crashes into a sand dune and explodes, Scarlet's SPV collides with a set of oil tanks, fatally injuring Scarlet. The captain's soon-to-be-revived body is flown back to Spectrum Cloudbase.

== Regular voice cast ==
- Sylvia Anderson as Melody Angel
- Ed Bishop as Captain Blue
- Cy Grant as Lieutenant Green
- Donald Gray as Colonel White, Captain Black and the Mysterons
- Francis Matthews as Captain Scarlet

== Production ==
Writer Bryan Cooper, who had co-authored a book about North Sea oil, based the plot of "Fire at Rig 15" on the disaster known as the "Devil's Cigarette Lighter": an Algerian gas well fire that burned for six months between 1961 and 1962 until it was finally extinguished by detonating a nitroglycerin charge at its epicentre to dispel the surrounding oxygen. The character of Jason Smith was inspired by Red Adair, the Texan oil well fire-fighter who put out the blaze, while Smith's tractor was an adaptation of the modified bulldozer that Adair used to deliver the charge. The episode's other guest characters were named after colleagues of Adair: Kinley after Myron M. Kinley and Charlie Hansen after Charlie Tolar and Asger "Boots" Hansen (co-founder of the well control company Boots & Coots). In the original script, the location of the Spectrum refinery was given as "Bethsheba" rather than "Bensheba".

The episode was filmed in May 1967. Smith's tractor was an original design by special effects assistant Mike Trim, while the scale model of the Bensheba refinery incorporated parts of a miniature model originally built for the Thunderbirds episode "Ricochet". The incidental music was performed by a band of 15 instrumentalists and recorded during a four-hour studio session on 22 July 1967 alongside the music for "Shadow of Fear". The incidental track, titled simply "Rig 15", is included on the CD release of the Captain Scarlet soundtrack. "Fire at Rig 15" was the last episode of Captain Scarlet to be made featuring the original instrumental version of the series' closing theme music; subsequent episodes used a lyrical version sung by The Spectrum.

== Reception ==
According to Paul Cornell, Martin Day and Keith Topping, authors of The Guinness Book of Classic British TV, "Fire at Rig 15" is one of several Captain Scarlet episodes that "seem little more than left-over Thunderbirds scripts." Anthony Clark of sci-fi-online.com comments negatively on the episode, calling it the "typical, and rather dull, 'Mysterons destroy something and Spectrums runs about' story". He argues that the setting "could just as easily be a submarine base or high-security installation, which makes it hard to care about what's going on."

Writer Fred McNamara considers the episode "competent and uncomplicated" yet also a "routine, sub-plotless affair", believing the story to be a weak imitation of "Avalanche". Though impressed by the climax, he regards the build-up as little more than an "extended chase sequence" which lacks the earlier episode's atmosphere of menace. However, he describes this "return to basic charms" as a "tonic" rather than a "comedown".
