= Peter Curran (director) =

British TV scriptwriter and film director (1924–1999)

- Born: Peter Robert Emmett Curran; 26 September 1924; London, England
- Died: 23 June 1999 (aged 74); Hampshire, England
- Occupations: Screenwriter; Film director; Film producer; Film editor

Peter Curran (26 September 1924 – 23 June 1999) was a British screenwriter, film director, film editor and film producer.

He co-wrote five episodes of the Supermarionation television series Captain Scarlet and the Mysterons in the 1960s, forming a writing duo with David Williams: "White as Snow", "Point 783", "Seek and Destroy", "Noose of Ice" (erroneously credited to Tony Barwick) and "The Launching".

Curran co-edited the film Bait (1950) and was sole editor on When Dinosaurs Ruled the Earth (1970). He went on to direct Male Bait (1971), Penelope Pulls It Off (1975) and Tell It like It Is, Boys (1981). His other film credits include The Cherry Picker (1972; as writer, producer, director and editor) and A Touch of the Sun (1979; as writer, director and editor).
