= The Cherry Picker =

1974 British drama film by Peter Curran

- Opening titles
- Directed by: Peter Curran
- Screenplay by: Peter Curran
- Based on: the novel Pick Up Sticks by Mickey Phillips
- Produced by: Peter Curran
- Starring: Lulu; Bob Sherman; Terry-Thomas; Wilfrid Hyde-White; Spike Milligan
- Edited by: Jack Knight
- Music by: Bill McGuffie
- Production company: Twickenham Film Studios
- Release date: 1972
- Running time: 91 minutes
- Country: United Kingdom
- Language: English

The Cherry Picker (also known as The Quiet Life) is a lost 1972 British comedy-drama film directed by Peter Curran and starring Lulu, Bob Sherman, Wilfrid Hyde-White, Spike Milligan, Patrick Cargill, Jack Hulbert, Fiona Curzon, Terry-Thomas and Robert Hutton. The screenplay was by Curran based on the 1968 novel Pick Up Sticks by Mickey Phillips.

== Plot ==
American business tycoon James Burn II wants to find a proper job for his wayward hedonistic son James Burn III, and engages the help of Nancy. James Burn III marries Nancy and gets a dead-end job in a brewery. A series of events lead to him subsequently becoming the boss of the company, which now sells addictive beer.

== Cast ==
- Lulu as Nancy
- Bob Sherman as James Burn III
- Terry-Thomas as Appleby
- Wilfrid Hyde-White as Dobson
- Spike Milligan as Mr. Lal
- Patrick Cargill as Dr. Harrison
- Jack Hulbert as Sir Hugh Fawcett
- Fiona Curzon as Maureen
- Robert Hutton as James Burn II
- Priscilla Morgan as Mrs. Trulove
- Arthur Blake as Dan Haydock
- Barry Wilsher as vicar
- Bruce Boa as Dr. Softman
- Henry McGee as Pilkington
- Marianne Stone as Mrs. Lal
- Nikki van der Zyl as dubbed voice of Nancy

== Critical reception ==
The Monthly Film Bulletin wrote: "The title sequence for The Cherry Picker features a Pirelli calendar, with exquisite semi-nudes in Degas-like attitudes. What follows unfortunately fails to come near the sybaritic elegance we associate with that august institution dedicated to the leisure pursuits of big businessmen. Presumably aiming at satire of similarly institutionalised Playboy attitudes towards sex and role-playing, the film dithers over an inadequately scripted and crudely shot narrative that might charitably be described as 'rambling' or 'picaresque'."

== Preservation status ==
As of August 2014, the film was missing from the BFI National Archive; although inferior quality copies are still in circulation, including YouTube, it is listed as one of the British Film Institute's "75 Most Wanted" lost films due to the loss of the original print.
