= List of Terrahawks episodes =

This is an episode guide for the British television series Terrahawks, made for London Weekend Television by Anderburr Pictures and first broadcast from 1983 to 1986 on ITV. A total of 39 episodes, listed here in their recommended broadcast order, were filmed in two production blocks at Bray Studios between January 1983 and August 1984 on a combined budget of £6.4 million. The 26 episodes of the first block aired as two series, the first of which was broadcast between October and December 1983 and the second between September and December 1984. The final 13 episodes were broadcast as Series 3 between May and July 1986.

== Series 1 (1983) ==
Originally, most ITV franchises transmitted the episodes on Sunday afternoons. In November, several franchises moved the series to a Saturday morning timeslot. The last two episodes, "A Christmas Miracle" and "To Catch a Tiger", were broadcast across the ITV network on Saturday mornings. Television South (TVS) followed the network pattern until November, when it moved episodes to Thursdays. In some weeks, London Weekend Television was unable to show an episode, but made up for this by showing double episodes in other weeks. Granada Television held back the series by two weeks and completed its run on 21 January 1984. Tyne Tees Television held it back for over a month and moved the series to Thursdays, completing its run on 16 February 1984.

| No. | Title | Directed by | Written by | Original air date | Prod. code |
|---|---|---|---|---|---|
| 1 | "Expect the Unexpected: Part 1" | Alan Pattillo | Gerry Anderson | 8 October 1983 (Central ITV) | 1 |
Zelda attacks NASA's outpost on Mars and establishes her home, then mounts an attack on Earth, forcing the Terrahawks into battle.
| 2 | "Expect the Unexpected: Part 2" | Alan Pattillo | Gerry Anderson | 15 October 1983 (Central ITV) | 2 |
The Terrahawks struggle to defend against the aliens' strange powers, and find they may be forced to stop the attack at the cost of Ninestein's life.
| 3 | "Thunder-Roar" | Alan Pattillo | "Cubby Dreistein" | 22 October 1983 (Central ITV) | 3 |
Zelda defrosts one of her monsters, Sram, who unleashes his devastating voice against the Terrahawks.
| 4 | "Happy Madeday" | Tony Lenny | "Kit Tenstein" | 29 October 1983 (Central ITV) | 9 |
Zelda unleashes MOID, Master of Infinite Disguise, who kidnaps Hiro and impersonates him.
| 5 | "The Ugliest Monster of All" | Tony Lenny | "P. U. Mastein" | 5 November 1983 (Central ITV) | 11 |
The Terrahawks find a teddy bear-like alien adrift in a space capsule and take him back to Hawknest. However, he is actually one of Zelda's monsters and begins to wreak havoc in the base.
| 6 | "Close Call" | Desmond Saunders | "Cubby Dreistein" | 12 November 1983 (Central ITV) | 5 |
The Overlander is hijacked, but the hijacker, a news reporter by the name of Darrel, is a potential security hazard for the Terrahawks.
| 7 | "The Gun" | Tony Bell | "Koo Garstein" | 19 November 1983 (Central ITV) | 12 |
Yung-Star devises a way to make the Cubes more powerful by combining them. Zelda forms a group of them into a gun and threatens to destroy a newly constructed dam. Meanwhile, Tiger finally loses patience with the Zeroids and orders Zero to give them a new, 'standardised voice', but regrets his decision when all the Zeroids speak with the Sergeant Major's voice.
| 8 | "Gunfight at Oaky's Corral" | Tony Bell | "T. I. Gerstein" | 26 November 1983 (Central ITV) | 10 |
Ninestein enters an old-fashioned gun fight between one of Zelda's Cubes in the Arizona desert.
| 9 | "Thunder Path" | Tony Lenny | "Effie Linestein" | 3 December 1983 (Central ITV) | 13 |
Zelda gives Sram another chance to defeat the Terrahawks by sending him to hijack the Overlander, an automated vehicle that delivers vital supplies to Hawknest.
| 10 | "From Here to Infinity" | Alan Pattillo | "Katz Stein" (Donald James) | 10 December 1983 (Central ITV) | 6 |
An old space probe approaches Earth, but the Terrahawks worry because it was never meant to return.
| 11 | "Mind Monster" | Tony Bell | "Tom Katstein" | 17 December 1983 (Central ITV) | 14 |
The Terrahawks pick up a capsule in space containing only a strange vapour. However, it actually contains a gaseous monster that meddles with their minds.
| 12 | "A Christmas Miracle" | Tony Lenny | "Kate Noweestein" | 24 December 1983 (ITV network) | 20 |
Zelda attacks Earth on Christmas Eve, convinced that the Terrahawks' guard will be down. However, Ninestein anticipates such a move, and all-out war erupts. Perhaps the Christmas spirit can even reach someone like Zelda. (Broadcast only in the UK, on Christmas Eve 1983, and excluded from all repeat runs of Terrahawks in the 1980s.)
| 13 | "To Catch a Tiger" | Tony Lenny | "Claude Backstein" | 31 December 1983 (ITV network) | 15 |
Zelda lures Ninestein with the captured two-man crew of a commercial space transporter. When the Terrahawks electronically isolate themselves from after rescuing the men, Kate has to inform Ninestein that the mission to get him back is ahead of schedule.

== Series 2 (1984) ==
Episodes were mostly networked, airing on Anglia, Border, Central, Granada, London Weekend, Tyne Tees, Television South West, Yorkshire and Ulster franchises simultaneously on Sunday afternoons (occasionally in a different timeslot in franchises such as Grampian, Scottish and TVS).

| No. | Title | Directed by | Written by | Original air date | Prod. code |
|---|---|---|---|---|---|
| 14 | "Operation S.A.S." | Tony Lenny | "Tom Angeristein" | 23 September 1984 | 17 |
Zero and Dix-Huit roll to the rescue after Kate Kestrel is kidnapped by Yung-Star and Yuri.
| 15 | "Ten Top Pop" | Tony Bell | "L. Inkstein" | 30 September 1984 | 18 |
Kate is taken hostage by Andeburr Records employee Stuart "Stew" Dapples, who is under Zelda's control.
| 16 | "Play It Again, Sram" | Tony Bell | "B. O. Garstein" | 14 October 1984 | 22 |
Kate Kestrel wins the world song contest and goes on to compete in the interstellar song contest. Zelda contends that as a resident of Earth's solar system she has a right to participate too, and challenges Kate to a sing-off on a neutral planetoid with her family and Sram as her band.
| 17 | "The Ultimate Menace" | Tony Lenny | "Ivor Purstein" | 21 October 1984 | 25 |
Zelda and the Terrahawks team up to stop Zyklon, a gigantic spaceship dedicated to destroying all life in the universe.
| 18 | "Midnight Blue" | Tony Lenny | "Andre Le Chatstein" | 28 October 1984 (Grampian) | 21 |
While pursuing a ZEAF, Hawkwing flies too high and is marooned in space.
| 19 | "My Kingdom for a Zeaf" | Tony Lenny | "Sheik Spearstein" | 4 November 1984 | 23 |
Zelda dispatches Yung-star and a new monster, Lord Tempo, to find the location of Hawknest. While travelling back in time to avoid Spacehawk, they pick up King Richard III.
| 20 | "Zero's Finest Hour" | Tony Bell | "Otto Von Lowstein" | 11 November 1984 | 24 |
When the Terrahawks are rendered catatonic by space flowers, Zero is forced to battle for the cure on his own.
| 21 | "Cold Finger" | Tony Bell | "I. C. Bergstein" | 18 November 1984 | 38 |
Zelda enjoins the help of Cold Finger, an alien who uses water and ice as weapons.
| 22 | "Unseen Menace" | Tony Bell | "Felix Stein" | 25 November 1984 | 19 |
MOID perfects the greatest disguise of all: the invisible man.
| 23 | "Space Giant" | Tony Lenny | "Manny Pheakstein" | 9 December 1984 | 37 |
A pair of miners find and capture a Sporilla and take it back to Earth to sell to a shady sideshow owner. Once it is on Earth, Zelda uses her powers to enlarge the monster into an unstoppable giant.
| 24 | "Cry UFO" | Tony Bell | "Ewan Istein" | 16 December 1984 | 34 |
Stew Dapples becomes the eyewitness to Zelda's latest plot when he sees a UFO.
| 25 | "The Midas Touch" | Alan Pattillo | Trevor Lansdown & Tony Barwick | 23 December 1984 (Grampian) | 16 |
Zelda sends one of her monsters to blow up the "Space Fort Knox" to cause economic havoc.
| 26 | "Ma's Monsters" | Tony Bell & Tony Lenny | "Rory Peetstein" | 30 December 1984 (Border & Grampian) | 26 |
Zelda reflects on the exploits of her monsters, who have all failed to defeat the Terrahawks. She reveals she has a new store of frozen creatures with even deadlier powers. Cy-star has news of her own: she is having a baby. (Clip show marking the end of the first production block, featuring footage from the episodes "Thunder Path", "The Sporilla" and "Operation S.A.S.")

== Series 3 (1986) ==
The 13 episodes of the second production block were networked, airing on all ITV franchises simultaneously on Saturday mornings. Prior to its first appearance on UK television, the whole third series had already been broadcast in Japan, with eight episodes also having aired in the United States. Production codes start at 27 (skipping 26) to resolve the inconsistency in the numbering caused by the two-part pilot episode, "Expect the Unexpected", and to reflect the number of distinct episodes made for the first production block.

| No. | Title | Directed by | Written by | Original air date | Prod. code |
|---|---|---|---|---|---|
| 27 | "Two for the Price of One" | Tony Lenny | "Kay Itstein" | 3 May 1986 | 27 |
The aliens are preoccupied with the birth of Cy-star's child while the Terrahawks prepare to launch a sneak attack.
| 28 | "First Strike" | Tony Lenny | "Polly Phillestein" | 10 May 1986 | 31 |
An overzealous general seizes control of the Terrahawks to mount a direct assault on Zelda's Mars base. Ninestein makes futile attempts to warn him that Zelda and her gang of monsters are too powerful to engage in direct combat. Zelda readies a counter-strike team of Sram, Yuri, Lord Tempo and Yung-star.
| 29 | "Terratomb" | Tony Bell | "Edward E. Barestein" | 17 May 1986 | 32 |
Yuri seals Battlehawk inside Hawknest after Battletank picks up a bomb while investigating a ZEAF. (The final episode to be broadcast in the United States, on 24 January 1985.)
| 30 | "Space Cyclops" | Tony Lenny | "Lita Beerstein" | 24 May 1986 | 35 |
Zelda sends a huge egg to the moon that hatches into a one-eyed monster.
| 31 | "Doppelganger" | Tony Lenny | "Albert Zweistein" | 31 May 1986 | 33 |
A statue of Yung-star is found at a museum on Earth.
| 32 | "Child's Play" | Tony Bell | "Sue Donymstein" | 7 June 1986 | 28 |
It-star masterminds its first attack, attempting to destroy the Terrahawks with a bomb.
| 33 | "Jolly Roger One" | Tony Lenny | "Fred Barestein" | 14 June 1986 | 29 |
Yung-star and It-star are sent with Captain Goat to run a pirate radio ship to lure the Terrahawks into a trap.
| 34 | "Runaway" | Tony Bell | "Frank Instein" | 21 June 1986 | 30 |
Yung-Star runs away, but he is unknowingly carrying a 'bug' in the form of a powder inside him.
| 35 | "Space Samurai" | Desmond Saunders | "Cubby Dreistein" | 28 June 1986 | 7 |
Tamura, a Samurai warrior from outer space, forces Zelda and Ninestein to meet on neutral ground to settle their dispute peacefully. (Previously broadcast on 10 January 1985 in the United States and 16 July 1985 in Japan.)
| 36 | "Timewarp" | Tony Bell | "Major Daystein" | 5 July 1986 | 36 |
Lord Tempo creates a time warp to slow down the Terrahawks' ability to react to a full-scale attack.
| 37 | "Operation Zero" | Tony Lenny | "Ann Teakstein" | 12 July 1986 | 39 |
Zero is feeling out of sorts and goes in for repairs, but makes a grim discovery; Zelda and her family have infiltrated Hawknest.
| 38 | "The Sporilla" | Tony Bell | "Leo Pardstein" (Donald James) | 19 July 1986 | 8 |
Zelda lures the Terrahawks to Jupiter's moon Callisto by ransacking a listening post there. Once they arrive, they find themselves being stalked by the fearsome Sporilla. (Previously broadcast on 4 January 1985 in the United States and 14 May 1985 in Japan.)
| 39 | "GO(L)D" | Desmond Saunders | "Cubby Dreistein" | 26 July 1986 | 4 |
The Zeroids find an explosive meteorite, which the human Terrahawks mistake for gold and which Zero mistakes for the god that Ninestein worships; it kills one of Ninestein's clones when it explodes, forcing another to take his place. (Broadcast as the fourth episode – as originally intended – on 23 April 1985 in Japan; but as the 39th and final episode, on 26 July 1986, in the UK.)

== Compilation films ==
From 1983 to 1984, six compilation films comprising re-edited versions of episodes from Series 1 were released on VHS in the UK. Each film is approximately 86 minutes in length.

| No. | Title | Compilation of: |
|---|---|---|
| 1 | Expected the Unexpected | "Expect the Unexpected: Part 1", "Expect the Unexpected: Part 2", "Thunder-Roar" and "Close Call" |
| 2 | Menace from Mars | "Space Samurai", "The Sporilla", "Happy Madeday" and "From Here to Infinity" |
| 3 | Terror from Mars | "Thunder Path", "The Ugliest Monster of All", "Gunfight at Oaky's Corral" and "The Gun" |
| 4 | Hostages of Mars | "To Catch a Tiger", "Mind Monster", "Operation S.A.S." and "Ten Top Pop" |
| 5 | Flaming Thunderbolts | "My Kingdom for a Zeaf", "Play It Again, Sram", "Gold" and "Midnight Blue" |
| 6 | Zero Strikes Back | "The Midas Touch", "Unseen Menace", "Zero's Finest Hour" and "The Ultimate Menace" |

== Audio episodes ==
It was announced on 19 April 2014 that Terrahawks would be returning as a run of full-cast audio dramas featuring original cast members Denise Bryer, Jeremy Hitchen and Robbie Stevens. Anne Ridler who played Kate Kestrel and Cy-Star had died in 2011, and was replaced by Beth Chalmers, and Windsor Davies (since retired) who played Sergeant Major Zero was replaced by Jeremy Hitchen. The new audio stories were produced by Anderson Entertainment in association with Big Finish Productions. The first new series was released in April 2015, followed by a second series in April 2016 and a third in July 2017. Each series consisted of a 5-CD set, with eight episodes across four CDs and a behind-the-scenes documentary on the fifth featuring interviews with the cast and crew.

=== Volume 1 (2015) ===
| No. in series | Title | Directed by | Written by | Duration |
|---|---|---|---|---|
| 1 | "The Price is Right" | Jamie Anderson | Jamie Anderson | 35.31 |
With the prospect of budget cuts and a spot inspection looming over their heads, the Terrahawks intend to showcase themselves to the best of their ability. A surprise attack from Zelda, however, gives them a bigger chance to demonstrate their worth than originally bargained for.
| 2 | "Deadly Departed" | Jamie Anderson | Stephen La Rivière & Andrew T. Smith | 34.07 |
After an epic battle, it appears that Zelda has finally died, but when their beloved matriarch's will is read her android family is disgusted to discover that she has left everything to Ninestein. In retaliation, they organise a funeral the likes of which has never been seen.
| 3 | "A Clone of My Own" | Jamie Anderson | Andrew T. Smith & Stephen La Rivière | 37.57 |
When his clones begin to fall foul of mysterious circumstances, Ninestein is forced to face some difficult home truths.
| 4 | "Clubbed to Death" | Jamie Anderson | Stephen La Rivière & Andrew T. Smith with Jamie Anderson | 31.40 |
A night on the town turns deadly for the Terrahawks when the desperate proprietor of a hot new club just so happens to be in serious debt with Zelda's new loan shark venture.
| 5 | "101 Seed" | Jamie Anderson | Gerry Anderson, adapted by Jamie Anderson | 33.31 |
Zelda conspires to help the Terrahawks enter the record books when a seed of destruction is sewn on Hiro's happy birthday.
| 6 | "No Laughing Matter" | Jamie Anderson | Terry Adlam | 29.30 |
Zelda intends to use her latest creation – Cy Splitter, the universe's funniest cyborg – to leave her enemies helpless with laughter. The Terrahawks' only hope is that Twostein can play that game.
| 7 | "Timesplit" | Jamie Anderson | Chris Dale | 30.50 |
Past, present and futures collide when an audacious plan by Lord Tempo leads to the capture of one of the Terrahawks. Zelda is thrilled, but the resulting temporal instability has the potential to unravel the fabric of space and time.
| 8 | "Into the Breach" | Jamie Anderson | Mark Woollard | 37.22 |
The Zeroids face termination when Ninestein and Hiro roll out their newest creation – the Cyberzoids. These super-soldiers attempt to fend off a direct attack on Hawknest from Zelda's mothership.

=== Volume 2 (2016) ===
| No. in series | Title | Directed by | Written by | Duration |
|---|---|---|---|---|
| 1 | "Sale of the Galaxy" | Jamie Anderson | Andrew T. Smith & Jamie Anderson | 38.13 |
Ninestein and Zelda both receive invitations to appear on a gruesome gameshow – The Sale of the Galaxy. However the grim gameshow host, Nickel-plate Starsons' personal history with Zelda just might influence the outcome of the game.
| 2 | "The Trouble with Toy Boys" | Jamie Anderson | Chris Dale | 40.36 |
A pernicious puppet – one half of a famous ventriloquist act – is on the loose, but even the Terrahawks cannot keep a bad dummy down as Timmy the Toy Boy takes his final act to Hawknest.
| 3 | "Return to Sender" | Jamie Anderson | Chris Dale | 42.20 |
The return of a missing NASA probe and an encounter with an old flame of Ninestein's means a case of fatal attraction for the Terrahawks.
| 4 | "Renta-Hawks" | Jamie Anderson | Andrew T. Smith | 25.35 |
A beautiful island in the pacific – the secret base of Global Rescue. So far – undetected. Outwardly the luxury home to billionaire ex-nightclub owner Dick Branston. But there is something suspicious about this gang of slick would-be heroes – particularly the firm's backer.
| 5 | "Chain of Command" | Jamie Anderson | Geraldine Donaldson | 32.46 |
With Zelda missing, the government's focus is firmly on the Terrahawks, and Ninestein is under serious pressure to cooperate. So when a mysterious device lands in Texas, Kate and Mary must go on a Thelma and Louise style mission to prevent the package getting into the wrong hands.
| 6 | "Lights, Camera, Disaster" | Jamie Anderson | David Hirsch | 32.41 |
It-Star's plans for a propaganda movie go awry when Anderburr Pictures' new owner – Lord Low Grade – decides to make a few alterations to the script.
| 7 | "Count Anaconda's Magnificent Orbiting Circus" | Jamie Anderson | Terry Adlam | 31.58 |
Malevolent MC Count Anaconda welcomes one and all to the orbiting big top, although the chances are that one may never leave.
| 8 | "My Enemy's Enemy" | Jamie Anderson | Jamie Anderson | 59.21 |
Hiro and Ninestein finally decode Zelda's message, and not a moment too soon. The android queen is in trouble – on the run from her greatest foe; a direct descendant of her original master – Prince Zegar of Guk. The Terrahawks find themselves outgunned and outnumbered.

=== Volume 3 (2017) ===
| No. in series | Title | Directed by | Written by | Duration |
|---|---|---|---|---|
| 1 | "No Second Chances" | Jamie Anderson | Jamie Anderson | 39.31 |
Zelda has pulled off the ultimate heist, and now her victory seems inevitable. To stop her, and against all the odds, at least one of the Terrahawks will have to make the ultimate sacrifice.
| 2 | "The Wrong Clone Number" | Jamie Anderson | Terry Adlam | 37.44 |
Leaderless and desperate, the Terrahawks turn to pun-meister Twostein. After his victory against Cy Splitter, the comedy clone's arrogance could prove royally problematic for Earth's defenders.
| 3 | "Set Sail for Mis-adventure" | Jamie Anderson | David Hirsch | 35.29 |
Sixstein is drafted in to service for an escort mission. Professor Otto Maddox's new weapon is travelling via the Atlantic Ocean, and Zelda is poised and ready to take piracy to new extremes.
| 4 | "You-Foe" | Jamie Anderson | David Hirsch | 38.45 |
It is the last chance for the Terrahawks to replace their lost leader. But it becomes a race against time as Zelda and her family try to take advantage of the final clone, Threestein's, good nature.
| 5 | "Living Legend" | Jamie Anderson | Chris Dale | 37.34 |
It is time for Threestein's first major mission, and he is in for a treat – meeting one of his idols. But soon his encounter with galactic explorer Elias Crick proves that one should never meet one's heroes.
| 6 | "The Prisoner of Zelda" | Jamie Anderson | Chris Dale | 39.26 |
Threestein and Lois Price are kidnapped and taken to an unknown coastal location – where a bizarre village – The Community – becomes their prison. They are all now addressed by letters rather than their names, and encounter the mysterious 'Z'.
| 7 | "Star Crossed" | Jamie Anderson | Mark Woollard | 34.18 |
It is a case of romance, and Threestein's final chance to prove himself as a capable leader. But when it comes to matters of the heart, Stein clone must overcome his genetic shortcomings.
| 8 | "Enemies, Negotiation and Deceit" | Jamie Anderson | Jamie Anderson | 42.39 |
With both the androids and Terrahawks weary of the constant conflict and seemingly unending stalemate, a new approach is tabled. It is up to the humans and androids to settle their differences.
