= A Touch of the Sun (1979 film) =

1979 British-American film by Peter Curran

- Home video cover
- Directed by: Peter Curran
- Written by: Peter Curran; George Fowler
- Produced by: Elizabeth Curran; Oliver I. Irwin
- Starring: Oliver Reed; Sylvaine Charlet; Peter Cushing; Keenan Wynn
- Cinematography: David Mason
- Edited by: Peter Curran
- Release date: 1979
- Running time: 95 minutes
- Country: United Kingdom
- Language: English

A Touch of the Sun, also known as No Secrets!, is a 1979 British-American comedy film directed by Peter Curran and starring Oliver Reed, Sylvaine Charlet, Peter Cushing and Wilfrid Hyde-White.

== Plot ==
An American space capsule has crashed into an African dictatorship, whose ruler refuses to return it unless he is paid a large ransom. In response the Americans send in a secret agent to recover it.

== Cast ==
- Oliver Reed as Captain Daniel Nelson
- Sylvaine Charlet as Natasha
- Peter Cushing as Commissioner Potts
- Keenan Wynn as General Spellman
- Edwin Manda as Emperor Sumumba
- Wilfrid Hyde-White as M-1
- Hilary Pritchard as Miss Funnypenny
- Bruce Boa as Jim Coburn
- A.M. Phiri as Chief Zawie
- Melvyn Hayes as Ginger Rogers
- Mike Cross as Fred Astaire
- Fred Carter as President P. Nuts
- Benjamin Shawa as Emperor's aide
- Friday Nyamba as Emperor's aide
- Jim Kenny as US operator

== Critical reception ==
The Radio Times Guide to Films gave the film 1/5 stars, writing: "This would-be comedy stars Oliver Reed as a bumbling Us Army officer and Peter Cushing as a British commissioner who attempt to recover an American spaceship that's being held for ransom by an African emperor. The humour is so strained as to be sieved of all fun."
