= Captain Black =

Character from British television series Captain Scarlet

- Captain Scarlet and the Mysterons character
- Black's appearance changes (right) as he is taken over by the Mysterons in the first episode
- First appearance: "The Mysterons" (29 September 1967)
- Created by: Gerry and Sylvia Anderson
- Designed by: Christine Glanville (sculptor)
- Voiced by: Jeremy Wilkin; (before Mysteron contact): Donald Gray; (under Mysteron control): Gary Martin; (in the Captain Scarlet and the Return of the Mysterons CGI test film)

In-universe information
- Full name: Conrad Turner
- Occupation: Spectrum officer (formerly)
- Origin: Manchester, UK

Captain Black is the fictional nemesis of Captain Scarlet and the primary, recurring Mysteron agent in the 1960s British Supermarionation television series Captain Scarlet and the Mysterons and its 2005 animated remake, New Captain Scarlet.

"Black" is a codename; in the original series, the character's real name is never revealed (although in tie-ins he is named as Conrad Turner), while in the remake the character's tombstone indicates that his real name is Conrad Lefkon. The character's transformation from human to Mysteron agent occurs on Mars in the first episode of each series ("The Mysterons" and "Instrument of Destruction, Part 1").

== Depiction in Captain Scarlet ==
=== Development ===
The puppet was sculpted by Christine Glanville. Originally Black was to have been killed off at the end of "The Mysterons", but this idea was abandoned after Glanville altered the puppet to show that the character was under Mysteron control. According to Glanville: "Once I'd painted him up to look gaunt and pallid, Gerry [Anderson] took one look and decided to keep him on as a regular."

In a 1986 interview in which he discussed his approach to writing for the series, Captain Scarlet script editor Tony Barwick drew parallels between the premise and characters of Captain Scarlet and those of Thunderbirds – suggesting, for example, that the Spectrum Organisation could be compared to International Rescue and that Black was similar to the Hood, the main recurring villain in Thunderbirds.

Prior to Captain Scarlet and the Mysterons' official premiere in September 1967, Black had been referenced several times by the Century 21 comic TV Century 21 in strips documenting the aftermath of the fateful Zero-X mission and the structure of the Spectrum Organisation.

=== Character biography ===
In 2068, Black is seconded to command the Zero-X spacecraft for a crewed mission to Mars, assigned with investigating anomalous radio signals detected by the Spectrum Organisation. Previously, Earth was aware only of the existence of rock snakes on the planet (as seen in Thunderbirds Are Go); consequently, Black is alarmed to discover a fully-developed alien city on the Martian plains. When the inhabitants – a collective, intangible, artificial intelligence calling itself "the Mysterons" – rotate scanning apparatus towards the Martian Exploration Vehicle (MEV), Black misinterprets the attempt at peaceful first contact as preparations for an attack; believing the Mysterons to be hostile, he orders his subordinates to fire on and destroy the settlement. After using their power of "reversing matter" to reconstruct their city, the Mysterons condemn humanity's unwarranted aggression and declare a retributive "war of nerves" against Earth – the first act of which will be the assassination of the World President. As the aliens go on to state that "one of you will be under our control", Black undergoes a dramatic change of appearance as he sits in the cockpit of the MEV, his expression hardening and his face becoming pale – thus, he is transformed into the primary instrument of the Mysterons' campaign of vengeance. After Zero-X returns to Earth, Black disappears.

The exact nature of Black compared to other Mysteron agents is never explicitly stated in the series. Interpretations differ: Chris Bentley states that Black is killed on Mars and replaced with an indestructible Mysteron doppelganger, while according to Chris Drake and Graeme Bassett, the unique manner of his corruption suggests that unlike the Mysterons' other victims, he was not killed and duplicated but remains alive, albeit under Mysteron control.

Through Black, the Mysterons relay instructions to their reconstructed intermediaries, while compelling him to undertake acts of murder and terrorism through their deep, disembodied voice (in which Black now also speaks). Black's unique position is of clear importance to the Mysteron cause and thus elevates him above any of their other agents. This is evident in the episode "Manhunt"; after becoming a radiation hotspot through accidental exposure, he can then be tracked by Spectrum. Capturing Symphony Angel while evading their ground forces, he deliberately subjects her to radiation inside an atomic centre, but does not kill her and allows her to escape. Spectrum officers give chase to the Spectrum Pursuit Vehicle that they believe contains Black, but is in fact being driven (badly) by Symphony. His ruse a success, Black decontaminates himself and makes his escape. Captain Blue's surprised remark of "So he is alive!" when he sees security camera footage of Captain Black implies that until then they thought he was dead. In various episodes, like "The Mysterons" and "Point 783", he demonstrates the ability to filter out his voice while speaking so only other Mysteron agents can hear him.

According to text features in the comic TV Century 21 and related publications, Black was born Conrad Turner in Manchester, England (though until his corruption at the start of "The Mysterons", he speaks with a North American accent) and was orphaned at seven months as a result of a brief nuclear war. He was raised by distant relatives who provided little emotional support, causing him to be cold and reclusive during his adolescence. At 15, he entered Manchester Technical Academy (a chapter of the Northern University), and graduated with diplomas in physics, space navigation and international law; he then went into the Northern University and received diplomas in science and technology, all this done in three years. He joined the Royal Air Force and served in the British Civil War at the age of 18. After the country was admitted to the World Government, he achieved renown for his work in the World Army and Air Force, and later as a Fireball XL3 pilot in the World Space Patrol. He was Spectrum's first agent, and oversaw the construction of Cloudbase during the 2060s.

In the episode "Treble Cross", an air force test pilot unexpectedly survives an assassination attempt by the Mysterons and aids Spectrum in another effort to apprehend Black. However, he is not deceived when the human pilot poses as his own Mysteron duplicate and evades Spectrum for a second time; Captain Blue infers that the Mysterons have equipped him with a "sixth sense" to warn him of danger. If under threat of imminent capture, Black is able to teleport away from danger – an action demonstrated in the episodes "The Heart of New York", "Model Spy" and "Inferno".

The character is seen to wear his Spectrum uniform only in the pilot episode and in the secondary opening sequence for all episodes thereafter (in which he is shown to be standing symbolically in a moonlit graveyard). On all other occasions, he is wearing civilian clothing – typically black trousers, a black zip-up jacket and an orange sweater. This is presumably so the other Spectrum personnel cannot contact him therefore making him more inconspicuous, harder to pinpoint and aid in his elusiveness. However, he is shown wearing his uniform in various comic stories where there is no immediate demand for secrecy or when his mission would benefit from it, such as when the Mysterons took control of a robot production facility or when Black tried to manipulate an amnesic Scarlet into helping in an attack on a major conference being held to justify Spectrum's funding.

== Depiction in New Captain Scarlet ==
Captain Black
- New Captain Scarlet character
- First appearance: "Instrument of Destruction, Part 1" (12 February 2005)
- Voiced by: Nigel Plaskitt

In-universe information
- Full name: Conrad Lefkon
- Occupation: Spectrum officer (formerly)
- Significant other: Destiny Angel
- Origin: Brooklyn, New York

In the first episode of the remake series, Black's encounter with the Mysterons on Mars kills him outright. After being buried on Earth, he is resurrected by the Mysterons, breaking out of his grave and thereafter acting as their agent.

There are several differences between the original Black and the version seen in the remake. For example, his surname is Lefkon (as shown on his gravestone in the first episode, "Instrument of Destruction, Part 1"). The voice of the new Black is the same as before Mysteronisation, save when the Mysterons assume direct control over his body. Before Mysteronisation, he is portrayed as a sympathetic character, and was in a relationship with Destiny Angel. Unlike his rash and entirely unprovoked attack on the Mysteron city in the original series, here it is given some justification by the fact that scanning equipment on board the MEV explicitly identifies the Mysteron probe as a weapon. By contrast, after his Mysteronisation he is an almost stereotypical villain, taking pleasure in the acts of murder that he commits; in one episode, he leaves Captain Scarlet chained up next to a doomsday device, complete with digital countdown. However, on some occasions (for example, in the episode "Best of Enemies") Scarlet is able to educe Black's original personality, nearly to the point of breaking the Mysterons' conditioning.

In "Dominion", the series finale, Black is knocked unconscious while attempting to destroy a nuclear facility. On recovering, he claims to have been liberated from Mysteron control, and asks Scarlet to return with him to Mars to launch an attack on the Mysteron city. Although the attack is successful, the Mysterons re-assert control over Black. The final image of the series is of Black watching Scarlet's departing spacecraft, then turning about and walking into the distance; two green rings envelop him, and Black vanishes.

According to promotional materials, Conrad Lefkon was born in Brooklyn, New York and was the son of a local crime lord, and joined the army to escape from the "family business". However, in the series he speaks in an English accent, the inverse of the original show.

== Reception ==
With reference to the original Captain Scarlet, Morgan Jeffery of website Digital Spy refers to Captain Black as being one of the series' "most memorable elements", adding that the character's Mysteronised appearance and voice "were absolutely terrifying as a child. His presence, plus the high level of on-screen violence, made Captain Scarlet a heady cocktail for a young, petrified viewer." Eamonn McCusker of website The Digital Fix states that Black's vengefulness "knew no limits", noting that in one episode ("The Heart of New York") the character kills a gang of human bank robbers posing as Mysteron reconstructions because their "impersonation [...] had aroused his ire." In contrast, Geoff Willmetts of Sfcrowsnest writes that some of Black's actions seem "humane and even against his orders", pointing out that in the episode "Manhunt" he abducts Symphony Angel only to spare her life and release her: "Considering how easily Captain Black murdered other people to reach his masters' aims, this would seem out of character."

The character's name has also drawn comment for its colour symbolism. In a 1976 essay titled "Racism in the English Language", Robert B. Moore cited Captain Scarlet as an example of black-and-white dualism, pointing out that while the character who leads the heroic Spectrum Organisation has the codename "Colonel White", the malevolent Mysterons use an agent called "Captain Black". Moore presented this as an example of how "symbolism of white as positive and black as negative is pervasive in our culture." Daniel O'Brien, author of SF:UK: How British Science Fiction Changed the World, states that Black's characterisation as a villain is "to no one's great surprise". When the series was repeated on BBC2 in the early 1990s, some commentators interpreted this colour opposition as having racist undertones. Gerry Anderson rejected this argument and pointed out that the series features heroic non-white characters in the form of Lieutenant Green, Melody Angel and Harmony Angel. Around this time, various newspapers reported that the Commission for Racial Equality (CRE) had filed a complaint against the BBC over the alleged racism of the names; the story was repetition of a baseless rumour started by a freelance reporter and was rejected by the CRE in its annual report. On black-and-white dualism, Guyanese actor Cy Grant, who voiced Lieutenant Green and praised the series for its multiculturalism, commented that "the 'darkness' of the Mysterons is most easily seen as the psychological rift — the struggle of 'good' and 'evil' — of the Western world as personified by Colonel White and his team. Dark and light are but aspects of each other. Incidentally, green is the colour of nature that can heal that rift."

Black has also been interpreted as part of a supposed religious allegory in the series. Grant and other commentators have compared Cloudbase (Spectrum's airborne headquarters, protected by a fighter squadron codenamed "the Angels") to Heaven, Colonel White (the head of Spectrum) to God, and the resurrected Captain Scarlet (White's top agent) to the Son of God; Black, a Spectrum officer-turned-Mysteron agent, is viewed as either an analogue of the Devil (a fallen angel) or a Judas figure in league with the "satanic" Mysterons of the planet Mars (which Grant likens to Hades). Anderson denied that any of this symbolism was intentional.

== Footnotes ==
=== Works cited ===
- Bentley, Chris (2001). The Complete Book of Captain Scarlet. London, UK: Carlton Books. ISBN 978-1-84222-405-2.
- Rogers, Dave; Marriott, John; Drake, Chris; Bassett, Graeme (1993). Supermarionation Classics: Stingray, Thunderbirds and Captain Scarlet and the Mysterons. London, UK: Boxtree. ISBN 978-1-85283-900-0.
