= Captain Blue =

Fictional character from Captain Scarlet

- Captain Scarlet and the Mysterons character
- Blue as seen in the 1960s TV series
- First appearance: "The Mysterons" (29 September 1967)
- Created by: Gerry & Sylvia Anderson
- Designed by: Terry Curtis
- Voiced by: Ed Bishop

In-universe information
- Full name: Adam Svenson
- Occupation: Spectrum officer
- Significant other: Symphony Angel
- Nationality: American

Captain Blue
- New Captain Scarlet character
- Blue as seen in the 2005 remake
- First appearance: "Instrument of Destruction, Part 1" (12 February 2005)
- Voiced by: Robbie Stevens

In-universe information
- Full name: Adam Svenson
- Occupation: Spectrum officer
- Significant other: Lieutenant Green
- Nationality: American

Captain Blue (born Adam Svenson) is a character in the British Supermarionation television series Captain Scarlet and the Mysterons (1967–68) and its animated remake, New Captain Scarlet (2005). He is a senior officer in the Spectrum Organisation, which is committed to defending Earth against the Mysterons, he is also the best friend of Captain Scarlet.

== Origin and design ==
Captain Blue was among the first characters to be conceived by series creator Gerry Anderson who, having determined that "Scarlet" would make for an unusual codename for the series' protagonist, resolved that his mission partner could be codenamed "Blue". Script editor Tony Barwick, who commented on what he perceived as the series' "quite formalised writing", wrote Blue as "the foil, the nice guy" of Captain Scarlet.

In a 1982 interview for Starlog magazine, Captain Blue voice actor Ed Bishop described his casting by the Andersons: "There was an actor in the series named Cy Grant [voice of Lieutenant Green]. We happened to have the same agent and Sylvia Anderson had called to ask about him. The girl at the agency said, 'You people use a lot of Americans on your shows and we have this American actor.' Sylvia told her to send me along. It's just as simple as that." Gerry approved of what Bishop termed his "wall-to-wall corporate voice", judging it suitable for the role of a "smooth-talking co-star".

Although Bishop believed that he was the template for Blue's likeness, the puppet sculptor, Terry Curtis, had in fact already made a rough modelling in his own image, and simply changed the hair colour from brown to blond at the direction of Sylvia Anderson (Bishop himself, like Curtis, was darker-haired). The puppet's total cost was 500 guineas, or £525 (about £9,000 in 2025). It has been suggested that Blue's blue-eyed and blond-haired appearance influenced that of Commander Ed Straker, Bishop's live-action role in the later Anderson series UFO.

== Depiction ==
=== Captain Scarlet and the Mysterons ===
Blue, as depicted in the 1960s series, was born on 26 August 2035 to a Boston, Massachusetts financier. After graduating from Harvard University, he embarked on a career as a pilot before joining Spectrum. Blue is courageous, hard-working and a natural leader, but also deferential to the commands of Colonel White. He regularly partners with Captain Scarlet on missions and, although his best friend is indestructible, frequently fears for his safety. For example, in the episode "Winged Assassin", Blue attempts to prevent Scarlet from suicidally ramming the wheels of a Mysteronised airliner using a Spectrum Pursuit Vehicle (SPV). He serves as acting commanding officer of Cloudbase during White's absence in "White as Snow", and stands in for Lieutenant Green as communications officer in "Avalanche".

Blue occasionally disobeys commands out of his own curiosity. For example, in "Renegade Rocket", he refuses to leave a military base that is being targeted by its own missile, electing to remain behind with Scarlet in an attempt to find the self-destruct code, and in "Special Assignment", being unaware that Scarlet's discharge from Spectrum is in fact part of the Captain's undercover mission, leaves Cloudbase without authorisation to find and reason with his friend. Physically active, Blue regularly practises surfing, water-skiing and deep-sea harpoon fishing. A romance with Symphony Angel is suggested in some episodes: in "Manhunt", Blue is distressed by Captain Black's abduction of Symphony and is anxious to venture into a nuclear power station to rescue her, while in "Attack on Cloudbase", the two characters share a long gaze after Symphony experiences a disturbing nightmare about the base's destruction.

=== New Captain Scarlet ===
In the 2005 remake, Blue is still a brave Spectrum officer and loyal companion; however, he is of stronger build and speaks with a rougher accent. He prefers to confront situations swiftly and has fewer reservations about using violence against the Mysterons than he did previously. He appears to have a romantic interest in Serena Lewis (the female Lieutenant Green), but this is never explicitly described as a relationship.

The reimagined character was modelled on Casper Van Dien as Johnny Rico in the film Starship Troopers (1997).

== Reception ==
James Stansfield of the entertainment website Den of Geek describes Blue as Captain Scarlet's "trusty sidekick", adding that although the pair were equal in rank, Blue "was always the Robin to Scarlet's Batman". The character's subservience to Scarlet has been acknowledged by Bishop, who suggested that Blue "got a raw deal, because he was very heroic, you know. He was very close to Scarlet, and I pulled him out of some very sticky wickets". Cultural historian Nicholas J. Cull comments that Blue's nationality, coupled with his status as a "strong supporting character", is representative of a general shift away from the predominantly American protagonists of earlier Anderson series, including Thunderbirds.
