= Robert Lynn (director) =

British film director (1918–1982)

- Lynn in 1957
- Born: 9 July 1918; Fulham, London, England
- Died: 15 January 1982 (aged 63); London, England
- Other name: Robert Bryce Lynn
- Occupations: Film director Film producer
- Years active: 1947–1982
- Parent: Ralph Lynn (father)

Robert Lynn (9 July 1918 – 15 January 1982) was a British film and TV director. His TV work includes Interpol Calling, Armchair Theatre and Captain Scarlet.

He also produced the classic children's film The Railway Children (1970).

He was the son of actor Ralph Lynn.

== Selected filmography ==
- Information Received (1961)
- Two Letter Alibi (1962)
- Postman's Knock (1962)
- Dr. Crippen (1962, released 1963)
- Take Me Over (1963)
- Victim Five (1964)
- Coast of Skeletons (1964)
- Mozambique (1965)
- Change Partners (1965)
- Sandy the Seal (1965, released 1969)
- Eve (1968)
