= Spectrum Pursuit Vehicle =

Fictional land vehicle

- Captain Scarlet and the Mysterons vehicle
- First appearance: "The Mysterons" (29 September 1967)

Information
- Affiliation: Spectrum Organisation
- Auxiliary vehicles: Removable power pack (converts into a jet pack or other equipment)

General characteristics
- Armaments: Rocket launcher, laser cannon, electrode ray cannon
- Defences: Bulletproof chassis
- Maximum speed: On land: 200 or 250 miles per hour (320 or 400 km/h); On water: 50 knots (93 km/h; 58 mph)
- Propulsion: Twin turbo jets (on water)
- Power: Hydrogenic electric fuel cells Removable power pack Auxiliary batteries
- Mass: 8 tons
- Length: 25 feet (7.6 m)
- Width: 8 feet (2.4 m)

The Spectrum Pursuit Vehicle (SPV) is a fictional pursuit and attack vehicle featured in the 1960s science fiction television series Captain Scarlet and the Mysterons. Mass-produced for the Spectrum Organisation to counter Mysteron attacks against Earth, SPVs possess rocket launchers and directed-energy weapons and form the backbone of Spectrum ground forces.

Designed by Derek Meddings from an outline by series creators Gerry and Sylvia Anderson, the vehicle has drawn comment for its incorporation of backwards-facing seats, a decision that Gerry Anderson later regretted as it proved confusing to viewers.

== Origin and design ==
In 2002, series co-creator Gerry Anderson explained how the vehicle's safety features were borne out of his "preoccupation" – demonstrated in various aspects of Captain Scarlet – "with things not being what they seemed ...With a flick of a switch the walls of these buildings would collapse to reveal this astonishing vehicle inside. I knew kids would find that exciting." He quickly regretted his decision to make the seats rear-facing, commenting: " ... we began to realise that the audience was going to say, 'Why are these people facing backwards?' So we wrote an explanation into the first script. Then I realised that not everyone would have seen that episode so we had to put explanations in again and again."

There were moves afoot to have rear-facing seats in airliners. In the event of a crash-landing the passengers would be forced into their seats as the plane decelerated, as opposed to being hurled forwards ... I thought, 'I'll be very smart here and on this futuristic SPV we'll have seats facing backwards'.

— Gerry Anderson on the concept

The SPV was designed by special effects director Derek Meddings based on a brief description given in the Andersons' original script for the first episode, which specified only that the SPV was a high-speed armoured vehicle with reversed seating (and therefore no windscreen), running on a removable "lightweight power unit". Noting that the occupants faced backward and viewed the road through a TV monitor, Meddings said that "all [this] meant to me was that I could design the vehicle without windows." For added realism, these were replaced with grilles and air vents.

To fulfil his vision of a "menacing, shark-like" assault vehicle, Meddings added a tail fin to the design. He also incorporated a broad front bumper, intended to be shock-absorbent, and five pairs of wheels (in two sizes), as he thought that vehicles with a large number of wheels "looked more interesting on screen." He said that he was pleased with the SPV design because he believed that it "could be filmed from any angle".

Several filming models were built. They were made of either balsa or hardwood in a range of scales, the largest being 24 inches (61 cm) long.

== Depiction ==
Spectrum's main armoured land vehicle, the SPV is an amphibious, all-terrain machine that can be driven in extreme environments as well as in cities. It is 25 feet (7.6 m) long and has a maximum speed of either 200 or 250 miles per hour (320 or 400 km/h) on land. It is fitted with five pairs of wheels (the three over the front, middle and rear axles constituting the main drive), with additional traction for mountainous environments provided by rear-mounted, hydraulically lowered caterpillar tracks.

Within the hermetically sealed cabin, the driver, co-driver and a passenger are seated backwards, facing the rear, to reduce the possibility of injury in the event of a crash. The driver is aided by a video monitor displaying vertically-flopped front and rear views. The SPV is armed with a front-mounted rocket launcher, housed underneath a foldaway panel, and is also equipped with a radar system and ejector seats. The hydrogenic power unit can be removed and re-assembled as a personal jet pack or other devices of comparable size, components for which are stored in the vehicle's rear compartment.

SPVs are distributed worldwide and are requisitioned from disguised buildings and other structures, guarded by undercover operatives. A Spectrum agent can use an SPV only upon presenting his or her identification.

== Reception and influence ==
James Taylor of Car magazine ranks the SPV as one of the top ten vehicles in Gerry Anderson productions. On the vehicle's design, he comments that "all-round visibility [was] clearly not a priority of Captain Scarlet's employers." Andrew Blair of website Den of Geek calls the SPV "clearly the best vehicle" in Captain Scarlet. Comparing it to "a tank driven at ludicrous speeds, while facing backwards and located in secret garages around the world", he argues that the vehicle represents "probably the fastest transformation from covert to ridiculously unsubtle that fiction has ever seen." Tat Wood of TV Zone magazine questions Spectrum's logic in keeping its SPVs hidden until they are needed ("inside caravans, gasometers, tubes of Pringles or wherever") given that they are "then abandoned on the road".

The rear-facing system is praised by commentators Jim Sangster and Paul Condon, who credit the feature as an innovative "work of genius". Drawing a parallel between Anderson's comments on aircraft design and the Paul Klee monoprint Angelus Novus, Mark Bould of the University of the West of England argues that the system is "full of metaphorical potential" in that it represents Anderson "[promulgating] a naive vision of progress while reinforcing the status quo. Consequently, while the SPV driver [...] might be oriented like the angel of history, he is incapable of seeing what lies behind its forward thrust. Not for him the catastrophe accumulating in his wake; just the deceptively uncluttered road ahead. His [monitor] screen screens: it shows and it obscures. And in such an echo chamber, as Benjamin's fifth thesis notes, 'every image of the past that is not recognised by the present as one of its own concerns, threatens to disappear irretrievably.'"

The SPV's curved front bumper inspired the rounded edges of LaCie's "Rugged" external hard drive, designed by Neil Poulton.

In 2022, YouTuber Tom Scott published a video in which he and a tech company build a go-kart with backwards-facing driver and passenger seats, similar to the SPV. Motorsport Network reported that the experiment had been a success: "It's a little tricky for the mind, especially at higher speeds, but everything works as it should. Does it make any sense? No, not all. But is it fun? A hundred percent."

In a preview of the Polestar 4, Andrew English of The Daily Telegraph compared the car's lack of a rear window in favour of an external camera system to an SPV driver's reliance on a video monitor while seated backwards.

=== Toys and model kits ===
Several toys and miniature models of the SPV have been released. These include a 1960s friction-drive toy by Century 21 Toys and die-cast models by Dinky, as well as newer versions by Corgi, Vivid Imaginations and Product Enterprise. Japanese company Imai released a model kit version in 1993.

Action features on the Dinky model included a sliding driver's seat containing a Captain Scarlet figurine, as well as a spring-operated missile. The latter was fired by squeezing the front sets of wheels, avoiding the need for what Century 21 considered to be "ugly-looking buttons". It remained on sale until 1975 and became Dinky's best-selling toy of all time, as well as one of the most popular die-casts ever made in the UK. According to website Television Heaven, the SPV "was the toy to have in the early 1970s", and featured "almost as many gadgets and working parts as the ever-popular original Corgi James Bond Aston Martin DB5."

The 2003 version by Product Enterprise was larger than the earlier toys and given a duller spray finish. A 2023 Diecast Collector review of the product described it as "[i]n some ways [...] the best SPV model ever made, certainly in terms of detail and build quality", but criticised its "dusty, weathered" and "grubby" look. Corgi released an updated version in 2024.

In 2025, Scalextric announced its release of a 1:32 scale slot car racing version.

== The Rhino ==
In the animated remake New Captain Scarlet (2005), the SPV is replaced by the Spectrum Rhino. The Rhino is more heavily armed than the SPV, and unlike the original is incapable of travelling on water. Instead of being hidden in safehouses, it is deployed from Skybase via Albatross dropships. Rhino drivers adopt a forward-facing driving position, unlike their predecessors.
