= Martin King (actor) =

British actor and continuity announcer (1933–2019)

- Born: 10 March 1933; Auckland, New Zealand
- Died: 15 April 2019 (aged 86); London, UK
- Burial place: Our Lady of Lourdes & St Joseph Catholic Church, Leigh-on-Sea, UK
- Occupations: Actor; continuity announcer
- Years active: 1961–1990

Martin King (10 March 1933 – 15 April 2019) was a British actor and continuity announcer.

His television credits included Dixon of Dock Green (1961), Crossroads (1964), Detective (1968) and The Troubleshooters (1969). He also appeared in the 1966 Doctor Who serial The Power of the Daleks.

King was associated with the productions of Gerry Anderson, having provided voices for the Supermarionation series Captain Scarlet and the Mysterons (1967–68) and Joe 90 (1968–69). He also had an uncredited role in the film Doppelgänger (1969). Other film appearances included Poor Cow (1967).

King also served as a continuity announcer for both ITV Southern Television and the BBC. He also worked in radio, including the BBC World Service.

King died of stomach cancer on 15 April 2019 aged 86. His funeral was held at Corpus Christi Roman Catholic Church, Maiden Lane, also known as the Catholic Actors' Church, on 20 May 2019.

== Filmography ==
Year	Title	Role	Notes
1967	Poor Cow	Prison Warder	Uncredited
1969	Doppelgänger	Dove Service Technician	Uncredited, final film role
