= Ed Bishop =

American actor (1932–2005)

Coordinates: 52°14′52.92″N 1°19′23.12″W

- Born: George Victor Bishop; June 11, 1932; Brooklyn, New York, U.S.
- Died: June 8, 2005 (aged 72); Kingston upon Thames, Surrey, England, United Kingdom
- Resting place: Napton, Warwickshire, England, United Kingdom
- Education: Boston University; London Academy of Music and Dramatic Art
- Occupation: Actor
- Years active: 1959–2005
- Television: UFO; Captain Scarlet and the Mysterons
- Spouses: Jane Thwaites (m. 1955; div. 1955) Hilary Preen (m. 1962; div. 1996) Jane Skinner (m. 2001)
- Children: 4

George Victor Bishop (June 11, 1932 – June 8, 2005), known professionally as Ed Bishop or Edward Bishop, was an American actor, predominantly based in the UK. He was known for playing Commander Ed Straker in UFO, Captain Blue in Captain Scarlet and the Mysterons and for voicing Philip Marlowe in a series of BBC Radio adaptations of the Marlowe novels by Raymond Chandler.

== Early life ==
George Victor Bishop was born on June 11, 1932, the son of a Manhattan banker, in Brooklyn, New York. He attended Peekskill High School before a brief spell at teacher training college. Bishop served in the United States Army as a disc jockey with the Armed Forces Radio at St. John's in Newfoundland where he was introduced to acting with the St John's Players.

After leaving the army, Bishop enrolled at Boston University where he initially studied business administration but halfway through the course, transferred to drama, much against his parents' wishes. After graduating in Theatre Arts, he won a Fulbright Scholarship to study for two years at the London Academy of Music and Dramatic Art, from which he graduated in 1959; he almost immediately found work in the British theatre and film industries. He adopted the stage name "Ed Bishop" at this time to distinguish himself from George Bishop, an established actor of the time. His first Broadway appearance was as Villebosse in David Merrick's production of Jean Anouilh's The Rehearsal in 1963, though he returned to Britain in 1964.

== Career ==
Bishop made his film acting debut as an ambulance driver in Stanley Kubrick's 1962 movie Lolita. He played an American astronaut going to the Moon in the film The Mouse on the Moon (1963) and also appeared in The Bedford Incident (1965) and Battle Beneath the Earth (1967). In 1966 Bishop appeared in The Saint (S5, E8 'The Man Who Liked Lions') playing Tony Allard, a reporter friend of Simon Templar's who is murdered after a few lines. He had small speaking roles in the James Bond films You Only Live Twice (1967) and Diamonds Are Forever (1971), but was not included in the film credits for either. He appeared in a second Kubrick film, 2001: A Space Odyssey (1968), in which he played the Captain of the Aries 1B Moon shuttle. The role initially featured dialogue but this was later cut from his scenes.

Bishop appeared in various film and television projects created by producer Gerry Anderson. He provided narration, in addition to the voice of Captain Blue, for Anderson's Supermarionation puppet series, Captain Scarlet and the Mysterons (1967), and appeared in Anderson's science-fiction film Doppelgänger (1969). His most prominent screen role was that of Ed Straker in Anderson's science-fiction series UFO (1970–71). Bishop's dark hair was initially dyed blond for the role, though he eventually wore a blond wig instead.

In later years, he appeared in films such as Twilight's Last Gleaming, Saturn 3, Silver Dream Racer, and The Lords of Discipline. He provided vocal work for the 1974 animated TV series of Star Trek, and appeared as Lieutenant Colonel Harrity in the final episode of the British World War II prisoner-of-war drama Colditz. In the 1980s, he made several appearances on The Kenny Everett Television Show, Whoops Apocalypse (he also appeared in the subsequent film), and had a role in the children's television series Chocky's Children.

Ed Bishop is one of the most talented people I've ever worked with, and my only sadness was that he didn't go on to become an international star. I would have loved him to have perhaps been James Bond.

— Gerry Anderson, Mr Thunderbird – The Gerry Anderson Story (2000 TV movie)

On radio in 1977 and 1978, Bishop played the private eye Philip Marlowe in The BBC Presents: Philip Marlowe, adaptations of Raymond Chandler's stories for the BBC. The last of these, Farewell, My Lovely, was produced almost a decade after the others, as the rights had previously been unavailable.

He continued to act on film, TV and radio, usually in British and European productions, and was a frequent guest at science fiction conventions. He and fellow Anderson actor Shane Rimmer (a Canadian actor who often worked in the UK) joked about how frequently their professional paths crossed and termed themselves "Rent-a-Yank". They appeared together as NASA operatives in the opening of You Only Live Twice and as United States Navy sailors in The Bedford Incident, as well as the 1983 film of the Harold Robbins novel The Lonely Lady. In 1989, Bishop was reunited with Rimmer and another Anderson actor, Matt Zimmerman, in the BBC Radio 4 adaptation of Sir Arthur Conan Doyle's A Study in Scarlet. He and Rimmer also toured together in theatre shows, including Death of a Salesman in the 1990s, and they both appeared in the BBC drama-documentary Hiroshima (2005), one of Bishop's last TV projects.

In 2000, Bishop briefly reprised the role of Captain Blue in a trailer for the new Captain Scarlet series. He did not, however, reprise the role for the actual series, which would not debut until five years later. In 2002, he recorded a commentary for the DVD release of UFO. In 2003, he performed in the Doctor Who audio drama, Full Fathom Five, produced by Big Finish Productions.

== Personal life ==
Bishop was politically active, participating in the March 2003 UK protest against the Iraq War. Bishop had already shown his disapproval of the military-industrial complex when, in 1993, he gatecrashed an arms-trade fair held in Aldershot, Hampshire whilst dressed to resemble Augusto Pinochet. During the Aldershot protest he met photographer Jane Skinner, who later became his third wife.

Bishop was married three times; first to Jane Thwaites in 1955 before divorcing a few months later in that same year. He then married Hilary Preen in 1962; they had four children, they remained married for thirty-four years before divorcing in 1996. He later married photographer Jane Skinner in 2001, the marriage lasted until his death in 2005.

== Death ==
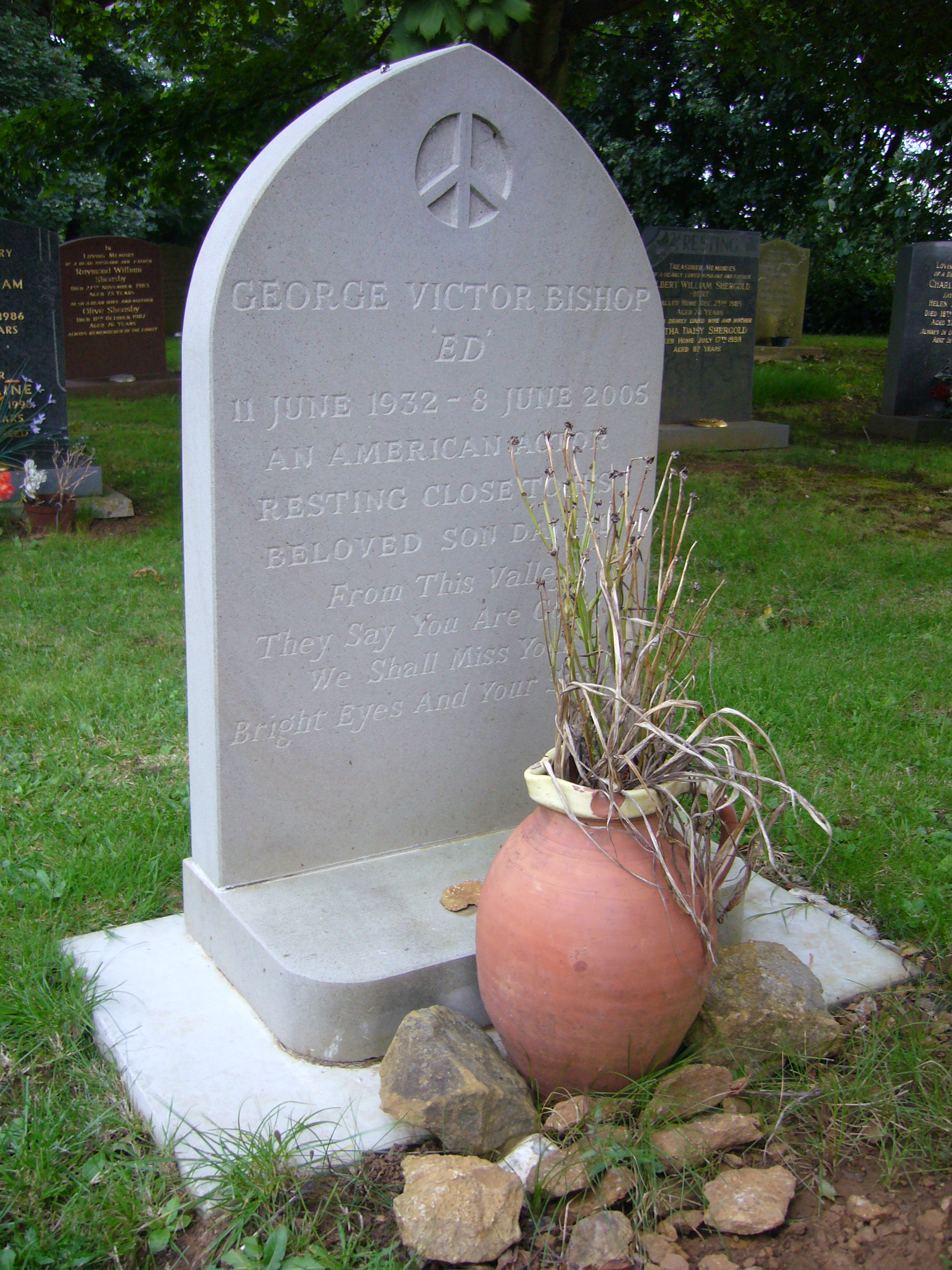
Bishop's grave in St Lawrence churchyard, Napton, Warwickshire

Bishop died on June 8, 2005, at the age of 72. He succumbed to a chest infection contracted while undergoing treatment for leukemia. He is buried in the churchyard of the Parish Church of Saint Lawrence in Napton, Warwickshire, having previously lived in that town for many years. His grey sandstone tombstone has a peace symbol prominently engraved on it. Its design is very similar to the one situated two metres (6 feet) on the right, which marks the grave of his son Daniel (16 May 1967 – 18 January 1988), who was killed in a car accident in Cumbria. Bishop's epitaph (from Red River Valley) reads: From This Valley They Say You Are Going. We Shall Miss Your Bright Eyes And Your Smile. He spent the last few years of his life living in West Molesey.

His life and work were honoured at the British Academy Television Awards in May 2006. He was survived by his widow and by three daughters from his second marriage (Georgina, Jessica and Serina).

== Filmography ==
=== Film ===
Year	Title	Role	Notes
1962	Lolita	Ambulance Attendant	Uncredited
1962	Big City	Narrator	Credited as Edward Bishop
1962	The War Lover	Vogt	
1963	The Mouse on the Moon	American Astronaut	
1963	The Cool Mikado	Man	Uncredited
1963	Automania 2000	Narrator	Voice, Short
1964	The Winston Affair	Lieutenant at Sikri	Credited as Edward Bishop
1965	You Must Be Joking!	U.S. Air Force Soldier at Checkpoint	Uncredited
1965	The Bedford Incident	Lieutenant Hacker U.S.N. - Communications	Credited as Edward Bishop
1967	You Only Live Twice	Hawaii CapCom	Uncredited
1967	Battle Beneath the Earth	Lt. Cmdr. Vance Cassidy	Credited as Edward Bishop
1968	2001: A Space Odyssey	Aries-1B Lunar Shuttle Captain	Credited as Edward Bishop
1969	The Desperados	Army Captain	Voice
1969	Doppelgänger	David Poulson	Credited as Edward Bishop
1970	Children and Cars	Narrator	Voice, Short
1971	Diamonds Are Forever	Klaus Hergersheimer	Uncredited
1973	Pets	Vincent Stackman	
1974	The Bunny Caper	Stuart Beard	aka Sex Play and Games Girls Play
1977	Twilight's Last Gleaming	Major Fox	
1977	Madame Claude	Smith	
1978	Brass Target	Col. Stewart	
1979	Butch Minds the Baby	Damon Runyon	Voice, Short Film
1980	Saturn 3	Harding	Uncredited
1980	Silver Dream Racer	Al Peterson	
1980	Breakaway, The Local Affair	Scott Douglas	A six episode TV serial by Francis Durbridge
1981	Amin: The Rise and Fall	Narrator	Voice, Uncredited
1982	Nutcracker	Sam Dozier	
1983	The Lords of Discipline	Commerce St. Croix	
1983	The Lonely Lady	Dr. Baker	
1985	Restless Natives	TV Reporter (American)	
1986	Whoops Apocalypse	Wink Persiman	
1987	Turnaround	Gerald	
1987	Testimony	American Commentator	
1988	Judgement in Berlin	Dyson Wilde	
1989	Out of Time	Grant	
1989	The Candy Show		Short
1991	Born to Ride	Dr. Tate	
1994	Funny Man	Card Player	
2001	500!	Father Jones	

=== Television ===
Year	Title	Role	Notes
1961	Drama 61-67	First Reporter	Episode: "Drama '61: Edge of Truth"
1964	Paul Starr	Paul Starr	TV movie; credited as Edward Bishop
1964–1966	The Saint	Tony Allard / George Felson / Cy Imberline / Sherm Inkler	4 episodes; credited as Edward Bishop
1965	Mogul	Mr. Kramer	Episode: "Stoneface"; credited as Edward Bishop
1966	Court Martial	Law Officer	Episode: "Shadow of a Man"; credited as Edward Bishop
1967	The Baron	Naval Officer	Episode: "The Island"; uncredited
1967	Theatre 625	Padfield	Episode: "Sword of Honour #3: Unconditional Surrender"; uncredited as Edward Bishop
1967–1968	Captain Scarlet and the Mysterons	Captain Blue / Narrator (voice)	32 episodes; credited as Edward Bishop
1968	Man in a Suitcase	American Agent	Episode: "The Boston Square"
1968	The Portrait of a Lady	Caspar Goodwood	4 episodes; credited as Edward Bishop
1968	Sherlock Holmes	Joseph Stangerson	Episode: "A Study in Scarlet"; credited as Edward Bishop
1969	Out of the Unknown	Commandant Tom Decker	Episode: "Beach Head"; credited as Edward Bishop
1969	Armchair Theatre	Karl	Episode: "On Vacation"
1969	The Way We Live Now	Hamilton K. Fisker	2 episodes
1969	W. Somerset Maugham	Edward Barnard	Episode: "The Fall of Edward Barnard"
1969	Strange Report	Moran	Episode: "Report 5055: Cult - Murder Shrieks Out"; credited as Edward Bishop
1970–1971	UFO	Col. Ed Straker	26 episodes
1971	ITV Sunday Night Theatre	David Beeston	Episode: "Man and Boy"
1972	The Adventurer	Wayne	Episode: "Miss Me Once, Miss Me Twice and Miss Me Once Again"
1973	The Protectors	Colonel John Hunter	Episode: "The First Circle"
1973	Star Trek: The Animated Series	Asmodeus (voice)	Episode: "The Magicks of Megas-Tu"; uncredited
1974	Orson Welles' Great Mysteries	The Millionaire	Episode: "Compliments of the Season"
1974	Colditz	Lt. Col. Harrity	Episode: "Liberation"
1974	Marked Personal	Howard Morris	2 episodes
1974	Late Night Drama	The M.D.	Episode: "Just Fine"
1974	Warship	Sanders	Episode: "The Man from the Sea"
1975	Anne of Avonlea	Judson Parker	2 episodes
1975	The Girls of Slender Means	Felix Dobell	2 episodes
1975	Oil Strike North	Patterson	Episode: "Deadline"
1975	Quiller	Frank Ilroy	Episode: "The Price of Violence"
1975	Thriller	Gang Boss / Carson	2 episodes
1975	NBC Special Treat	TV Announcer (voice)	Episode: "Into Infinity"
1976	Rogue's Rock	Cyrus T. Triphammer	5 episodes
1976	The Day After Tomorrow	Narrator (voice)	TV movie
1976	Katy	Dr. Carr	6 episodes
1976	The Cedar Tree	Earl Mulligan	Episode: "Fete Accompli: Part 2"
1977	Two's Company	Jack	Episode: "The Honeymoon"
1977	1990	Ed Burbank	Episode: "Whatever Happened to Cardinal Wolsey?"
1978	Wilde Alliance	Wingman	Episode: "Danny Boy"
1978	Life at Stake	Jim Lovell	Episode: "Houston... We've Got a Problem"
1978	It Ain't Half Hot Mum	Colonel Sol Zimmerman	Episode: "The Stars Look Down"
1978	The Professionals	Braddock / Dr. Ernest Harbinger	2 episodes
1978	Dylan	Professor Goonmeyer	Documentary
1978	Tycoon	Frazer Carter	Episode: "Sleeping on Grass"
1979	ITV Playhouse	Brother Bethlehem (voice)	Episode: "Children of the Gods"
1979	Running Blind	Commander Nordlinger	Episode: "The Deception Operation"
1979	S.O.S. Titanic	Henry Harris	TV movie
1980	Breakaway	Scott Douglas	6 episodes
1980	Butterflies	Tony	Episode: "Gimme Shelter"
1980	Oppenheimer	General Tom Farrell	Episode: "Episode #1.5"
1981	Stainless Steel and the Star Spies	Stainless Steel (voice)	TV movie
1981	Take a Letter Mr. Jones	Joe Bradley	Episode: "Business Before Pleasure..."
1981	Play for Today	American Reporter	Episode: "London is Drowning"
1982	Whoops Apocalypse	Jay Garrick	6 episodes
1982	Bid for Power		
1982–1984	Kelly Monteith		2 episodes
1983	The Baker Street Boys	Marvin	2 episodes
1983	Philip Marlowe, Private Eye	District Attorney	Episode: "Finger Man"
1983	The Mad Death	Tom Siegler	Episode: "Episode #1.1"
1983–1986	The Kenny Everett Television Show	Various	5 episodes
1984	The Master of Ballantrae	Pinkerton	TV movie
1984	Master of the Game	Dr. Mattson	
1984	The First Olympics: Athens 1896	Mr. Bogardus	2 episodes
1984	Threads	US President (voice)	TV movie; uncredited
1985	The Man from Moscow	Alexander	2 episodes
1985	Chocky's Children	Dr. Deacon	5 episodes
1985	Going for the Gold: The Bill Johnson Story	Sanders	TV movie
1986	The Fifth Missile	Adm. Stewart Cullinane	TV movie
1986	Just Good Friends	Vernon	Episode: "Paris"
1987	The Two Mrs. Grenvilles	Strasser	2 episodes
1987	The Two Ronnies		Episode: "1987 Christmas Special"
1988	Les Girls	Cheese Rep	Episode: "Arrival"
1988	Worlds Beyond	Mr. Hitchcock	Episode: "Reflections of Evil"
1988–1993	French and Saunders	Head of Light Entertainment / Various Characters	2 episodes
1989	After the War	Charlie Lehmann	2 episodes
1989	The Les Dennis Laughter Show		Episode: "Episode #3.4"
1990	Chancer	Elmer	Episode: "Hazard"
1991	Motormouth	Mr. Miller	Episode: "Episode #4.9"
1992	The Young Indiana Jones Chronicles	Sentry	Episode: "Young Indiana Jones and the Curse of the Jackal"
1993	2point4 Children	Chet	Episode: "Whoopee, We're All Going to Die"
1994	The Imaginatively Titled Punt & Dennis Show		Episode: "Episode #1.2"
1996	Broken Glass	Stanton Case	TV movie
1997	Highlander	Edward Banner	Episode: "Diplomatic Immunity"
1998	The Demon Headmaster	TV Supremo	4 episodes
1998	The American	Gen. Packard	TV movie
1999	The Unexpected Mrs. Pollifax	Carstairs	TV movie
2002	Waking the Dead	Tyler	Episode: "Special Relationship: Part 1"
2005	Hiroshima	Stimson	Documentary; final role

== Discography ==
- Jerome Kern: Show Boat, conducted by John McGlinn, EMI, 1988
