= Jeremy Wilkin =

British actor (1930–2017)

- Wilkin in Doctor Who (1975)
- Born: David Jeremy Wilkin; 6 June 1930; Byfleet, Surrey, England
- Died: 19 December 2017 (aged 87)
- Education: Royal Academy of Dramatic Art
- Occupation: Actor
- Years active: 1950–2002
- Television: Thunderbirds; UFO

David Jeremy Wilkin (6 June 1930 – 19 December 2017) was an English actor, best known for his contributions to the television productions of Gerry Anderson.

Born in Byfleet, Surrey, Wilkin emigrated to Toronto, Ontario, Canada after completing his studies at the Royal Academy of Dramatic Art. He had previously trained as a doctor.

Returning to Britain in the mid-1960s, Wilkin provided the voice of Virgil Tracy for the second series of Thunderbirds following the departure of the character's original voice actor, David Holliday, in 1965. In 1968 he provided the voice of Captain Ochre, the original Captain Black and many supporting characters for Captain Scarlet and the Mysterons. He was also a recurring cast member for the live-action series UFO. Other Gerry Anderson credits include Joe 90 and The Secret Service.

Wilkin played one of the leads in the 1965 TV sci-fi series Undermind as Drew Heriot, a personnel manager inadvertently drawn into a sinister plot to control human minds and sow discord in society.

Later, Wilkin made a brief uncredited cameo as Captain Forsyth in the 1977 James Bond film The Spy Who Loved Me.

In Doctor Who he appeared as Kellman in the 1975 serial Revenge of the Cybermen and as the Federation agent Dev Tarrant in the first episode of Blake's 7, "The Way Back". Wilkin's other TV credits include Dixon of Dock Green, Man in a Suitcase, New Scotland Yard, Softly, Softly: Task Force, The New Avengers, and Reilly, Ace of Spies. Wilkin died in December 2017 at the age of 87.

== Filmography ==
Year	Title	Role	Notes
1965	Curse of the Fly	Inspector Ronet	(credited as Jeremy Wilkins)
1966	Thunderbirds Are Go	Virgil Tracy / Space Exploration Center President	Voice
1967	The Dirty Dozen	Sergeant at Command Post	Uncredited
1968	The Strange Affair	P.C. Wills	
1968	Thunderbird 6	Virgil Tracy / Hogarth	Voice
1969	Doppelgänger	Trajectory Analyst	Uncredited
1970	The Revolutionary		
1977	The Spy Who Loved Me	Captain Forsyth	Uncredited
1979	Meetings with Remarkable Men	Artillery Officer	
1986	The Climb	Albert Bitterling	
1986	Hyper Sapien: People from Another Star	Hyper Sapien Leader	
1994	Beg!	Dr. Melplash	
