= Tony Barwick =

British television scriptwriter (1934–1993)

- Born: 10 July 1934; London, UK
- Died: August 1993 (aged 59)
- Occupation: Television writer
- Writing career
- Pen name: Harry Bolt; James Barwick; Others
- Years active: 1960s–1993
- Genre: Science fiction
- Notable works: Captain Scarlet and the Mysterons; Joe 90; UFO; Terrahawks; Dick Spanner, P.I.

Tony Barwick (10 July 1934 – August 1993) was a British television writer who worked extensively on series created and produced by Gerry Anderson.

== Career ==
Before becoming a writer, Barwick was a laboratory worker for De Havilland and the Metropolitan Water Board, then a computer scientist for Elliott Brothers and National Cash Register. The first TV production he worked on was Danger Man, for which he wrote technical dialogue and several (unfilmed) teleplays.

From the mid-1960s, Barwick wrote episodes for Gerry Anderson's Supermarionation series Thunderbirds (two out of 32 episodes), Captain Scarlet and the Mysterons (21 out of 32 episodes), Joe 90 (16 out of 30 episodes) and The Secret Service (four out of 13 episodes), as well as his live-action series UFO (14 out of 26 episodes), The Protectors (ten out of 52 episodes) and Space: 1999 (two out of 48 episodes).

He also contributed scripts to Anderson and Christopher Burr's Supermacromation series Terrahawks, writing under various pseudonyms on all but one episode. All these pseudonyms ended with the suffix "-stein" in imitation of the name of the leading character, Dr Tiger Ninestein. Barwick wrote 35 of Terrahawks' 39 episodes; "The Midas Touch", which he co-wrote with Trevor Lansdowne, is the only one that credited him by his real name.

With the completion of Terrahawks, Barwick went on to write the whole of Anderson's two-part stop-motion series Dick Spanner, P.I., for which he was credited as "Harry Bolt".

Beside scriptwriting, Barwick also served as script editor on Captain Scarlet, Joe 90 and UFO. His other writing credits included The Persuaders!, The Pathfinders and The Professionals.

=== Other work ===
Anderson and Barwick collaborated on other projects, one of which was a treatment – ultimately rejected – for the James Bond film Moonraker. The similarities between this script and the 1979 film are limited to their shared title, with the plot of the completed film incorporating none of Barwick and Anderson's ideas.

== Personal life ==
Barwick continued to work as a writer until his death of cancer in August 1993 at the age of 59.
