= Donald Gray =

South African actor (1914–1978)

- Born: Eldred Owermann Tidbury; 3 March 1914; Tidburys Toll, Fort Beaufort, Cape Province, South Africa
- Died: 7 April 1978 (aged 64); Eastern Cape, South Africa
- Other name: Don Tidbury (stage name)
- Education: Marist College Uitenhage, Christian Brothers' College, Kimberley
- Occupation: Actor
- Years active: 1933–1975
- Employer(s): Paramount Pictures (1933–1935); BBC
- Television: Mark Saber (1955–1961); Captain Scarlet and the Mysterons (1967–1968)
- Spouse: Sheila Green (m. 1955)
- Children: 2

Donald Gray (born Eldred Owermann Tidbury, 3 March 1914 – 7 April 1978) was a South African actor, well known for his starring role in the British TV series Mark Saber, for providing the voices of Colonel White, Captain Black and the Mysterons in Captain Scarlet and the Mysterons, and for being the reason that Donald Marshall Gray changed his name to Charles Gray when he became an actor. Perhaps not coincidentally, in some spin-off media Colonel White's real name is stated to be Charles Grey.

== Life and career ==
=== Early years ===
Gray was born on an ostrich farm in Cape Province, South Africa.

=== Early life ===
In 1933, film company Paramount Pictures wanted to re-juvenate and diversify its contract players, and launched a competition known as the "Search for Beauty"; heats took place in nations across the English-speaking world. Eldred Tidbury entered in his native South Africa and was selected with Lucille du Toit, a dental nurse from Pretoria, as one of the winners. Colin Tapley, who would later appear opposite Gray in the TV series Mark Saber, was the New Zealand male winner. In total, there were 30 finalists worldwide, who were screen-tested over six weeks at the end of 1933. Of the 30, bit player contracts were awarded to 10, and Tidbury was selected as the overall male winner with a bonus of US$1,000, with which he bought a car. The overall female winner was Scottish actress Gwenllian Gill, who later followed Tidbury to Britain and became engaged to him; however, their engagement was broken off during the Second World War.

All the winners appeared in the 1933 film Search for Beauty, whose distribution was complicated by a ruling that it violated the Hays Code. Paramount kept Tidbury's contact during 1934, but in 1935, when his passport expired, Tidbury left; he did not wish to become an American citizen. By late 1935, he had re-appeared in Britain under the name Don Tidbury, and by the following year was calling himself Donald Gray. He became an engineering salesman selling a boiler preparation, acted in repertory theatre, and appeared in several films for Paramount's UK subsidiary, British & Dominions Film Corporation. In 1936, he encountered director Albert Parker and was given the leading role in Strange Experiment after James Mason quit the production. In 1938, he was chosen for a supporting role in Alexander Korda's film The Four Feathers, and appeared in other films before returning to repertory theatre in Aberdeen, Scotland in 1939 and 1940.

=== Military service ===
Initially turned down for military service owing to a duodenal ulcer, Gray later managed to enlist in the Gordon Highlanders, who had their barracks in Aberdeen, and succeeded in becoming what he called an "ordinary Jock" (having claimed some Scottish ancestry). In 1941, he was commissioned into the King's Own Scottish Borderers, becoming battalion education officer at Llanberis in North Wales. Gray left the Army briefly to appear with Dame Vera Lynn in the film We'll Meet Again (1943). In 1944, he was wounded by a German anti-tank shell in Caen, France, and his left arm was amputated.

=== Later life ===
After the war, Gray toured South Africa with his own repertory company, appeared in other films, and was contracted by the BBC radio repertory company. He left to appear in Saturday Island (1952) and then returned to the BBC, this time as a continuity announcer. Gray then starred as the one-armed detective Mark Saber in the British TV series of the same name, which ran for 156 episodes from 1955 to 1961. It was originally titled Mark Saber, or The Vise in the United States, but was later known as Saber of London and Detective's Diary. In 1957, The Vise was renamed, redeveloped, and transferred from ABC to NBC under the new title Saber of London. Following Mark Saber, Gray appeared in episodes of Dixon of Dock Green and Emmerdale Farm. In his later years, his voice, based on that of fellow South African actor Basil Rathbone, brought him work in voice-overs, advertisements and the TV series Captain Scarlet and the Mysterons.

He died of a coronary in South Africa in 1978.

== Selected filmography ==
- Search for Beauty (1934) – South Africa Talent Contestant (uncredited)
- Come On, Marines! (1934) – Marine (uncredited)
- Wagon Wheels (1934) – Chauncey (as Eldred Tidbury)
- Father Brown, Detective (1934) – Don (as Eldred Tidbury)
- Here Is My Heart (1934) – Young Yacht Guest (uncredited)
- Rumba (1935) – Watkins (uncredited)
- Well Done, Henry (1936) – Jimmy Dale
- The Belles of St. Clements (1936) – Albert de Courcey (as Don Tidbury)
- Strange Experiment (1937) – James Martin
- Murder in the Family (1938) – Ted Fleming
- 13 Men and a Gun (1938) – Johann
- Sword of Honour (1939) – Stukely
- The Four Feathers (1939) – Peter Burroughs
- We'll Meet Again (1943) – Bruce McIntosh
- The Idol of Paris (1948) – Police Inspector
- Saturday Island (1952) – William Peck
- The Diamond (1954) – Commander Gilles
- Burnt Evidence (1954) – Jimmy Thompson
- The End of the Affair (1955) – Party guest who is seen in the mirror kissing Sarah (uncredited)
- Timeslip (1955) – Robert Maitland
- The Quatermass Xperiment (1955) – TV Announcer (uncredited)
- Flight from Vienna (1955) – Colonel George Gordon
- The Vise / Saber in London – Mark Saber (TV series; 1955–1960)
- The Secret Tent (1956) – Chris Martyn
- Supersonic Saucer (1956) – Headmaster
- Satellite in the Sky (1956) – Capt. Ross
- Around the World in Eighty Days (1956) – Extra (uncredited)
- Schemer (1956)
- Out of the Shadow (1961) – Inspector Wills
- Captain Scarlet and the Mysterons (TV series; 1967–68) – The Mysterons / Colonel White / Captain Black
- The Golden Bowl (1972, TV series) – Sir John Brinder
