= Lunarville 7 =

- Captain Scarlet and the Mysterons episode
- Episode no.: Episode 15
- Directed by: Robert Lynn
- Written by: Tony Barwick
- Cinematography by: Julien Lugrin
- Editing by: Bob Dearberg
- Production code: SCA 15
- Original air date: 15 December 1967

Guest character voices
- Gary Files as the Shuttle Pilot; David Healy as the Lunar Controller; Martin King as Orson and SID; Jeremy Wilkin as the Shuttle Launch Controller

Episode chronology
← Previous "Special Assignment"	Next → "The Heart of New York"

"Lunarville 7" is the 15th episode of Captain Scarlet and the Mysterons, a British Supermarionation television series created by Gerry and Sylvia Anderson and produced by their company Century 21 Productions. Written by Tony Barwick and directed by Robert Lynn, it was first broadcast on 15 December 1967 on ATV Midlands.

Set in 2068, the series depicts a "war of nerves" between Earth and the Mysterons: a hostile race of Martians with the power to create functioning copies of destroyed people or objects and use the reconstructions to carry out specific acts of aggression against humanity. Earth is defended by a military organisation called Spectrum, whose top agent, Captain Scarlet, was murdered by the Mysterons and replaced with a reconstruction that later broke free of their control. Scarlet's double has a self-repairing ability that enables him to recover from injuries that would be fatal to any other person, making Spectrum's best asset in its fight against the Mysterons.

The first part of a story arc that concludes in "Dangerous Rendezvous", "Lunarville 7" sees Scarlet, Captain Blue and Lieutenant Green investigate a lunar colony after its controller unexpectedly declares the Moon a neutral body in Earth's conflict with Mars. In 1981, the episode was re-edited to form a segment of the American-made Captain Scarlet compilation film Revenge of the Mysterons from Mars.

== Plot ==
Broadcasting to Earth from Lunarville 7, the Moon's leader, the Lunar Controller, declares the Moon to be a neutral power in humanity's war with the Mysterons. Colonel White sends Captain Scarlet, Captain Blue and Lieutenant Green to the colony to present the World President's written response to this surprise announcement. Scarlet, Blue and Green are also ordered to investigate the Humboldt Sea on the Moon's far side, where orbital surveillance indicates that a new, unauthorised colony is being built.

On arrival at Lunarville 7, the officers are met by the Controller and his assistant, Orson. They are also introduced to the colony's main computer, an artificial intelligence called the "Speech Intelligence Decoder" (SID) that identifies humans through recognition discs. After the Spectrum trio hand over the President's letter, Orson agrees to take them on a trip in a Moonmobile, a vehicle that uses the Moon's low gravity to jump and glide over the lunar surface. However, when Scarlet suggests visiting the Humboldt Sea, Orson abruptly refuses and returns them to Lunarville 7. While retiring for the night, the trio find that their accommodation has been bugged.

Rising early, Scarlet attempts to request a Moonmobile from SID but discovers that the Controller has re-programmed the computer to accept only his commands. Scarlet also learns that the Controller has declared a state of emergency and ordered the evacuation of Lunarville 7. Scarlet switches recognition discs with the sleeping Controller to trick SID into giving him, Blue and Green a Moonmobile. Travelling to the Humboldt Sea, the officers discover a Mysteron installation under construction in a crater numbered "101".

Returning to Lunarville 7, Scarlet, Blue and Green confront the Controller and Orson, who appear to be Mysteron reconstructions. Scarlet, still wearing the Controller's disc, instructs SID to prepare an Earth-bound shuttle for immediate departure. When SID rejects the Controller's order to lock down the colony, the frustrated Controller produces a handgun and repeatedly shoots SID, causing an explosion that obliterates the control room, killing himself and Orson. Scarlet, Blue and Green blast off in the shuttle before further explosions destroy the whole colony.

== Regular voice cast ==
- Ed Bishop as Captain Blue
- Gary Files as Captain Magenta
- Cy Grant as Lieutenant Green
- Donald Gray as Colonel White and the Mysterons
- Francis Matthews as Captain Scarlet

== Production ==
The episode was filmed on Century 21 Studios' Stage 4. In his speech at the beginning of the episode, the Lunar Controller states that the Moon is home to approximately 4,000 people. In Barwick's original script, the character was then to have discussed the Moon's self-reliance in greater detail, declaring, for example: "We were all born on Earth, but I see a future where men will be born, spend their lives and die on the Moon." However, these lines were cut from the finished episode. The electronic voice of SID was provided by supporting voice actor Martin King, who spoke his lines into a vocoder supplied by Standard Telecommunication Laboratories of Harlow. The episode's closing titles credit STL for "electronic collaboration".

The miniature model of Lunarville 7 was built partly out of colanders and mixing bowls. Some elements of the puppet set design were recycled from Century 21's previous series, Thunderbirds: the Moonmobile cockpit incorporated sections of the interior of Thunderbird 4 and the Lunar Controller's desk was a modified form of the Glenn Field controller's desk from the film Thunderbirds Are Go (1966). The Moon shuttle cockpit was a red-dress of the Martian Exploration Vehicle interior first seen in Thunderbirds Are Go and again in "The Mysterons". The Lunarville Moonmobiles influenced the look of the SHADO Moonmobiles in Century 21's live-action series UFO.

The incidental music was performed by a four-member ensemble. It is largely electronic and was produced with an electric guitar and accordion, a vibraphone and an Ondes Martenot, the last of which was played by series composer Barry Gray himself. It was recorded on 23 July 1967 in the same studio session as the music for "The Launching". "Lunarville 7" was the first episode of Captain Scarlet to be produced featuring the lyrical version of the series' ending theme music (performed by The Spectrum), which was recorded on 26 July 1967.

== Reception ==
Chris Bentley, author of Captain Scarlet: The Vault and other books about the Andersons' work, considered "Lunarville 7" together with its follow-up, "Crater 101", to be his favourite story of the series, finding it memorable for being set off Earth. Chris Drake and Graeme Bassett regarded "Lunarville 7" as a good episode.

In his book Spectrum Is Indestructible, writer Fred McNamara praised the episode, calling it an "enjoyably solid, moody affair". Though he believed the mystery to be undermined by some of the dialogue – White's announcement of a new installation in the Humboldt Sea, followed by the Controller and Orson plotting against their Spectrum guests, making it clear the Mysterons have infiltrated the Moon well before it is confirmed on screen – McNamara summed up "Lunarville 7" as a "comfortably confident package whose slower pace allows time for its individual elements to shine". He particularly commended David Healy's performance as the Controller, Lieutenant Green's substantial role, and the design of the Mysterons' lunar complex, describing it as a "spellbinding bit of visual pulp". In a later article, he ranked it among the best episodes of Captain Scarlet, commenting that the reveal of the Mysteron outpost and the Controller and Orson's true identities is "an enthralling twist, which in turn highlights 'Lunarville 7''s most winning aspect – its sense of terror-stricken mystery [...] We may be left without answers, but isn't it more suitably terrifying that we don't know?" He again praised Healy for his "scene-stealing" voice acting, adding that his portrayal of the Controller's psychosis gives the episode "a memorable finale".

Discussing the incidental music, Mark Brend wrote that the episode features "one of [Barry Gray's] most fully realised predominantly electronic compositions". He praised the music's "evocation of the cold, desolate expanses of the Moon", calling it "impressive". Andrew Pixley and Julie Rogers of Starburst magazine viewed the "rather nasty karate blow" that Blue lands on Orson during the Spectrum officers' escape from the Moon as one of the series' more violent moments. The British Board of Film Classification certified the episode U, noting that it contains one "mild" instance of violence.

In a discussion of the presentation of Moon politics in science fiction, Stephen Baxter pointed to this episode – in which the Lunar Controller repeatedly asserts the Moon's independence and neutrality – as an example of how "even juvenile portrayals of lunar colonies can hint at political complications." Paul Cornell, Martin Day and Keith Topping, authors of The Discontinuity Guide, cited "Lunarville 7" and "Crater 101" as influences on the 1969 Doctor Who serial The Seeds of Death.

The song "Lunarville 7, Airlock 3" by the stoner metal band Orange Goblin is named after this episode.
