= Shadow of Fear (Captain Scarlet and the Mysterons) =

- Captain Scarlet and the Mysterons episode
- Episode no.: Episode 12
- Directed by: Robert Lynn
- Written by: Tony Barwick
- Cinematography by: Julien Lugrin
- Editing by: John Beaton
- Production code: SCA 13
- Original air date: 2 February 1968

Guest character voices
- Paul Maxwell as Dr Breck; Charles Tingwell as Dr Carter; Jeremy Wilkin as Dr Angelini

Episode chronology
← Previous "Avalanche"	Next → "The Trap"

"Shadow of Fear" is the 12th episode of Captain Scarlet and the Mysterons, a British Supermarionation television series created by Gerry and Sylvia Anderson and filmed by their production company Century 21 Productions. Written by Tony Barwick and directed by Robert Lynn, it was first broadcast on 2 February 1968 on ATV Midlands.

Set in 2068, the series depicts a "war of nerves" between Earth and the Mysterons: a race of Martians with the power to create functioning copies of destroyed people or objects and use them to carry out acts of aggression against humanity. Earth is defended by a military organisation called Spectrum, whose top agent, Captain Scarlet, was killed by the Mysterons and replaced by a reconstruction that subsequently broke free of their control. Scarlet's double has a self-healing power that enables him to recover from injuries that would be fatal to anyone else, making him Spectrum's best asset in its fight against the Mysterons.

In "Shadow of Fear", a Spectrum operation to obtain orbital reconnaissance of Mars is threatened when an astronomer is killed and reconstructed by the Mysterons. The episode is one of four that were subsequently re-edited and combined to make Revenge of the Mysterons from Mars (1981), a Captain Scarlet compilation film produced by the New York office of distributor ITC Entertainment.

== Plot ==
To learn more about the Mysterons, Spectrum have devised "Operation Sword", the objective of which is to land a spy probe on Mars's moon Phobos to capture detailed images of the planet's surface. The first probe is detected and destroyed by the Mysterons but the second, Mini-Sat 5, touches down safely and begins its orbital reconnaissance. Once Phobos has made a full orbit of Mars, the images will be transmitted to Earth, where they will be received at K14 Observatory in the Himalayas.

Captains Scarlet and Blue have been dispatched to K14 to observe astronomers Carter, Angelini and Breck. To the astronomers, the second probe was able to reach Phobos undetected by travelling in the "shadow of fear": "Phobos" – the name of an attendant of Mars in Greek mythology – means "fear", and the probe avoided detection by approaching the moon from behind so that it would remain invisible to Mars.

A few hours before transmission, Breck is viewing Mars through a telescope when the planet begins to flash brightly. Overcome by the dazzling light, he is killed and replaced by a Mysteron reconstruction. Knowing that K14's antenna will need to be rotated to receive the transmission, the reconstructed Breck plants a bomb in the rotation gear, rigging the device to explode when the gear is turned. He then hides in the rocks above the observatory. Aided by Melody Angel and Captain Grey in a Spectrum helicopter, Scarlet and Blue pursue and locate Breck. Revealing his sabotage, the reconstruction fires a gun at the officers but is shot dead by Scarlet. However, before Scarlet and Blue can warn K14, Carter and Angelini turn the antenna and the bomb explodes, causing the antenna to collapse and crush the observatory.

With Carter and Angelini dead and K14 destroyed, Earth misses the probe's transmission. However, Colonel White insists that Operation Sword will go on.

== Regular voice cast ==
- Sylvia Anderson as Melody Angel
- Ed Bishop as Captain Blue
- Cy Grant as Lieutenant Green
- Donald Gray as Colonel White and the Mysterons
- Francis Matthews as Captain Scarlet
- Paul Maxwell as Captain Grey

== Production ==
"Shadow of Fear" was the final episode of Captain Scarlet to be made featuring the voices of Paul Maxwell and Charles Tingwell, both of whom left the series after this episode. Tingwell had theatre commitments, while Maxwell had been cast as Steve Tanner in Coronation Street. After "Shadow of Fear", the regular characters of Captain Grey and Doctor Fawn, who were voiced by Maxwell and Tingwell respectively, continued to appear in the series but only in a non-speaking capacity. Both Maxwell and Tingwell can be heard in the clip show series finale, "The Inquisition", which includes a flashback to "Big Ben Strikes Again" with the two actors voicing background characters. (Tingwell's voice is also featured in flashbacks to the first episode in "Dangerous Rendezvous" and "Traitor".)

The incidental music was performed by a group of 15 instrumentalists and recorded during a four-hour studio session held on 22 July 1967. Music for "Fire at Rig 15" was also recorded during this session.

== Reception ==
According to Anthony Clark, as with "Crater 101" and "Dangerous Rendezvous", the episode's pace "could hardly be described as breakneck." However, he added that when grouped with these episodes, "Shadow of Fear" does serve to "progress Spectrum's fight back against the Mysterons". Shane M. Dallmann of Video Watchdog magazine called the miniature model work "excellent" but also notes the violence of the episode, describing the story as "astonishingly downbeat". The British Board of Film Classification certified the episode U, stating that it contains "infrequent, very mild" violence.

Fred McNamara of Starburst magazine regarded "Shadow of Fear" as a "key" episode of Captain Scarlet and one of eight "essential episodes" of Supermarionation. Praising Lynn's direction, he wrote that the episode "captures Captain Scarlet's dark heart completely, offering a rare instance where the Mysterons succeed against Spectrum." In his book Spectrum is Indestructible, he considered "Shadow of Fear" to be well paced with a "solid" script and "perfect" execution. He especially commended the depiction of Spectrum's powerlessness to avert disaster, as well as the editing of the shots showing the aftermath of K14's destruction. However, he found it strange that despite being alluded to several times, "Operation Sword" is never actually explained, while subsequent episodes make no mention of it. He also saw White's closing statement as a "cheap shot at optimism" that comes across as "jarring" and unwelcome given the devastation and loss of life that have just occurred. In a later article, he ranked it among the best episodes of Captain Scarlet, writing that Maxwell "exceeds" in voicing the reconstructed Breck and describing the last shots of the probe, still sending back images, as "downright haunting".

Chris Drake and Graeme Bassett applaud the score, commenting that the use of electronic music makes the space scenes suitably "eerie". Musical cues from the episode were re‑used in UFO, the Andersons' first live-action TV series.
