= Dangerous Rendezvous =

- Captain Scarlet and the Mysterons episode
- Episode no.: Episode 22
- Directed by: Brian Burgess
- Written by: Tony Barwick
- Cinematography by: Ted Catford
- Editing by: Bob Dearberg
- Production code: SCA 20
- Original air date: 9 February 1968

Guest character voices
- Sylvia Anderson as Dr Kurnitz's Receptionist; Charles Tingwell as Lieutenant Dean (flashback); Jeremy Wilkin as Dr Kurnitz and Human Captain Black (flashback)

Episode chronology
← Previous "Crater 101"	Next → "Noose of Ice"

"Dangerous Rendezvous" is the 22nd episode of Captain Scarlet and the Mysterons, a British Supermarionation television series created by Gerry and Sylvia Anderson and filmed by their production company Century 21 Productions. Written by Tony Barwick and directed by Brian Burgess, it was first broadcast on 9 February 1968 on ATV Midlands.

Set in 2068, the series depicts a "war of nerves" between Earth and the Mysterons: a hostile race of Martians with the ability to create functioning copies of destroyed people or objects and use these reconstructions to carry out specific acts of aggression against humanity. Earth is defended by a military organisation called Spectrum, whose top agent, Captain Scarlet, was murdered by the Mysterons and replaced with a reconstruction that later broke free of their control. The double of Scarlet has powers of self-repair that enable him to recover from injuries that would be fatal to any other person, which make him Spectrum's best asset in its fight against the Mysterons.

Following on from the destruction of the Mysterons' lunar outpost and the recovery of its crystal power source (as seen in "Crater 101"), "Dangerous Rendezvous" sees the crystal adapted into a communication device which Spectrum use to contact the Mysterons in an attempt to make peace with the Martian enemy. Meanwhile, the Mysterons vow to destroy Spectrum's headquarters, Cloudbase (a threat they repeat in "Attack on Cloudbase"). "Dangerous Rendezvous" is one of four episodes that were later re-edited and combined to create Revenge of the Mysterons from Mars, a Captain Scarlet made-for-TV compilation film produced by the New York office of distributor ITC Entertainment in 1981.

== Plot ==
Following the destruction of the Mysteron outpost on the Moon, Dr Kurnitz of the Nash Institute of Technology has discovered that the Mysteron crystal extracted by Spectrum can be used to communicate with the Mysterons on Mars. Captain Scarlet and Captain Ochre escort Kurnitz to Cloudbase, where an interplanetary transmitter has been constructed. Meanwhile, the Mysterons threaten to destroy Cloudbase at midnight.

Kurnitz activates the transmitter and Colonel White addresses the Mysterons. Recalling the Zero-X mission to Mars, White insists that the attack on the Mysteron city was motivated not by hostility, but by fear, and ends his broadcast with an offer of peace. Two hours later, the Mysterons respond: they agree to negotiate on the condition that a single unarmed Spectrum officer depart from Cloudbase and fly on a bearing that will take him over Greenland. Scarlet volunteers for the mission and leaves in a Spectrum Passenger Jet.

After Scarlet crosses the Greenland coast, the disembodied Mysteron voice orders him to eject. After Scarlet's jet crashes and explodes, he is picked up in an empty car under Mysteron control and driven to a remote shack containing a pulsating glass screen, behind which Captain Black is sitting. Instructing Scarlet to relay a "message" to humanity, Black starts a tape recording – in which the Mysterons merely re-affirm their intention to destroy all life on Earth – and departs. Scarlet smashes the screen to find a second Mysteron crystal, which begins to pulsate fiercely. He escapes the shack just before the crystal explodes.

Realising that the first crystal must also be a bomb, Scarlet commandeers the car and speeds to an unmanned radar station, where he transmits a warning to Cloudbase in Morse code. Seconds before midnight, White decodes Scarlet's message and orders Ochre to shoot out one of the base's observation windows and jettison the crystal, which explodes harmlessly in the atmosphere. Later, White says that Spectrum remains committed to finding a peaceful solution to its war with the Mysterons.

== Regular voice cast ==
- Ed Bishop as Captain Blue
- Cy Grant as Lieutenant Green
- Donald Gray as Colonel White, Captain Black and the Mysterons
- Francis Matthews as Captain Scarlet
- Liz Morgan as Destiny Angel
- Jeremy Wilkin as Captain Ochre

== Production ==
The conclusion of a three-episode story arc that begins in "Lunarville 7", "Dangerous Rendezvous" was actually filmed before the previous instalment, "Crater 101". It was shot immediately before "Traitor" on Stage 3 at Century 21 Studios.

By the time script editor Tony Barwick wrote "Dangerous Rendezvous" and "Traitor", filming on Captain Scarlet was several weeks behind schedule. To remedy this, Barwick wrote a flashback to the first episode into each script to reduce the amount of new footage that would need to be shot, enabling the two episodes to be filmed in a combined 15 days instead of 20. Although the script for "Dangerous Rendezvous" allotted four minutes of the 25-minute running time for this old material, the flashback in the finished episode – in which Colonel White recalls humanity's disastrous first contact with the Mysterons – runs for about two minutes.

Besides recalling the events that provoked Earth's war with the Mysterons, "Dangerous Rendezvous" was also written to explain a number of Spectrum protocols. Barwick prolonged Spectrum's wait for the Mysteron reply by adding scenes in which White, Captain Scarlet and Captain Blue, at the request of Dr Kurnitz, give an overview of the organisation's communications (specifically its cap radio technology and call signs) and put on a demonstration Angel launch.

"Dangerous Rendezvous" marks the return of the Spectrum maximum-security tanker transport "Yellow Fox", slightly modified from its first appearance in "Winged Assassin".

== Reception ==
"Dangerous Rendezvous" is considered the worst episode of the series by TV Zone magazine, which describes it as an anticlimactic "low-key effort" that "ends a trilogy of otherwise superb episodes on a let-down ... wasting two episodes' worth of superb build-up". Anthony Clark of sci-fi-online.com comments that while its pace "could hardly be described as breakneck", "Dangerous Rendezvous", along with "Crater 101" and "Shadow of Fear", helps to "progress Spectrum's fight back against the Mysterons". Writer Fred McNamara argues that while "Dangerous Rendezvous" arguably boasts Captain Scarlet's finest "narrative execution", the premise is let down by the episode's "disjointed" feel and the story "ends up asking more questions than it answers", failing to provide either a truly satisfying resolution to the "Lunarville 7" story arc or any "reverberating consequences" for the series as a whole.

Chris Drake and Graeme Bassett argue that the scenes of White, Scarlet and Blue explaining Spectrum's communications to Dr Kurnitz add interest to the episode. By contrast, Chris Bentley states that they are just padding, comparing them to the expository Stingray and Thunderbirds audio plays A Trip to Marineville and Introducing Thunderbirds. McNamara calls the various demonstrations for Kurnitz "narratively pointless", believing them to be among several "truly odd cul-de-sacs" in the story: "These moments are such an odd waste of screen time that they feel like filler, despite the abundance of plot." Drake and Bassett question White's logic in ordering a demonstration Angel launch while Cloudbase is under threat.

Media historian Nicholas J. Cull suggests that the premise was inspired by contemporary events, writing that the possibility of peace between Earth and Mars reflects "shifting attitudes" in the Cold War. Comparing "Dangerous Rendezvous" to other Tony Barwick scripts, Cull observes that Barwick's work often "reflected a yearning for détente and an alternative to the divided world."

The British Board of Film Classification certifies the episode U, noting that it contains one "very mild" instance of violence.
