= Crater 101 =

- Captain Scarlet and the Mysterons episode
- Episode no.: Episode 21
- Directed by: Ken Turner
- Written by: Tony Barwick
- Cinematography by: Julien Lugrin
- Editing by: John Beaton
- Production code: SCA 19
- Original air date: 26 January 1968

Guest character voices
- Sylvia Anderson as Linda Nolan; David Healy as Frazer; Jeremy Wilkin as Shroeder

Episode chronology
← Previous "Flight to Atlantica"	Next → "Dangerous Rendezvous"

"Crater 101" is the 21st episode of Captain Scarlet and the Mysterons, a British Supermarionation television series created by Gerry and Sylvia Anderson and filmed by their production company Century 21 Productions. Written by Tony Barwick and directed by Ken Turner, it was first broadcast on 26 January 1968 on ATV Midlands.

Set in 2068, the series depicts a "war of nerves" between Earth and the Mysterons: a race of Martians with the power to create functioning copies of destroyed people or objects and use them to carry out acts of aggression against humanity. Earth is defended by a military organisation called Spectrum, whose top agent, Captain Scarlet, was killed by the Mysterons and replaced by a reconstruction that subsequently broke free of their control. Scarlet's double has a self-healing power that enables him to recover from injuries that would be fatal to anyone else, making him Spectrum's best asset in its fight against the Mysterons.

"Crater 101" is the second part of a three-episode story arc that begins in "Lunarville 7" and concludes in "Dangerous Rendezvous". The plot of the episode sees Scarlet, Captain Blue and Lieutenant Green set out to destroy a Mysteron installation being built on the far side of the Moon. The events of "Crater 101" are recalled in flashback in the series' clip show finale, "The Inquisition".

The episode is one of four that were later re‑edited and combined to create Revenge of the Mysterons from Mars (1981), a Captain Scarlet compilation film produced by the New York office of distributor ITC Entertainment.

== Plot ==
Following the destruction of Lunarville 7, Spectrum and the lunar authorities have made plans for the Mysteron complex in Crater 101, on the far side of the Moon, to be destroyed with an atomic device. However, to prevent the complex from being reconstructed, its power source will need to be removed first.

Volunteering for the mission, Captain Scarlet, Captain Blue and Lieutenant Green travel to Lunarville 6, where they are briefed by Controller Linda Nolan and her colleague Shroeder before departing for Crater 101 in a Moonmobile. Reaching the crater, they transfer to a Lunar Tractor. Automated sentry vehicles move to attack them but are immobilised when Green destroys the control vehicle with the tractor's rocket launcher. Donning space suits and entering the complex, they discover the power source to be a pulsating crystal embedded in machinery. However, unknown to the Spectrum officers, the Mysterons have killed and reconstructed Frazer, a Lunarville 6 colonist who has transported the atomic device to Crater 101 by Lunar Tank. Frazer has rigged the device to detonate two hours early to ensure the failure of the mission.

Learning of Frazer's sabotage, Nolan and Shroeder realise that they have no way of warning the Spectrum officers because Crater 101 is beyond radio range. They instead try to send a signal by firing an unarmed CB29 rocket into the crater. The CB29's arrival reminds Scarlet of the inscription on a good luck charm that Nolan gave him: in 2058, Nolan oversaw the launch of a Neptune-bound CB29 space probe that reached its destination "ahead of schedule". Repeating this phrase, Scarlet realises that the atomic device will detonate prematurely. He orders Blue and Green to return to the Moonmobile and clear the area while he attempts to extract the crystal. After much effort, Scarlet succeeds and escapes in the Lunar Tractor seconds before the nuclear explosion engulfs the crater and destroys the Mysteron complex. Scarlet, Blue and Green return to Earth with the crystal.

== Regular voice cast ==
- Ed Bishop as Captain Blue
- Gary Files as Captain Magenta
- Cy Grant as Lieutenant Green
- Donald Gray as Colonel White and the Mysterons
- Francis Matthews as Captain Scarlet

== Production ==
"Crater 101" is one of several Captain Scarlet scripts by Tony Barwick to include a mention of 10 July (the inscription on Nolan's charm states that the CB29 probe reached Neptune on 10 July 2058). Barwick liked to insert references to this date as it was his birthday. The script indicated that Lunarville 6 is smaller than Lunarville 7, which was destroyed in the episode of the same name. However, the two colonies are introduced with the same establishing shot, which was duplicated from the earlier episode for its appearance in "Crater 101".

The scene of Frazer setting off in the Lunar Tank features a newly built Lunarville filming model that recycled a number of elements from earlier episodes, including a Frost Line dome painting from "Avalanche" and a part of the Mini-Sat 5 probe model from "Shadow of Fear". The Lunarville 6 control room console was a re-use of the Lunar Controller's console from "Lunarville 7".

For its re-appearance in "Crater 101", the Moonmobile model was fitted with a cargo module intended to store the Lunar Tractor. The script described the Lunar Tank as running on "ball tyres"; however, the miniature model used caterpillar tracks. The Moonmobile cockpit seats were a re-use of the Thunderbird 2 and 3 seats from the film Thunderbirds Are Go (1966).

The episode's on-screen title is rendered as "CRATER I0I" in the series' customary Microgramma font, with letter "I"s replacing the "1"s. This was done as it was thought that Microgramma "1"s looked too similar to "7"s and that rendering "101" entirely in numerals would be confusing to viewers.

== Broadcast and reception ==
Although "Crater 101" is a direct continuation of "Lunarville 7", distributor ITC's official recommended broadcast order places it several episodes after "Lunarville 7" to conceal the fact that the puppet that plays Shroeder also appears as the XK3 pilot in the earlier episode.

=== Critical response ===
Anthony Clark of sci-fi-online.com commented that the pace of "Crater 101", like that of "Shadow of Fear" and "Dangerous Rendezvous", "could hardly be described as breakneck." However, he added that the episode begins "an interesting story arch [sic]." Paul Cornell, Martin Day and Keith Topping praised "Crater 101" for its creativity in "[taking] the fight to the Moon", describing it as being among the "finest pieces in the Anderson canon". They listed "Lunarville 7" and "Crater 101" as influences on the 1969 Doctor Who serial The Seeds of Death. Chris Bentley, author of Captain Scarlet: The Vault and other books about the Andersons' work, considered "Lunarville 7" and "Crater 101" combined his favourite story of the series. Among other aspects, he particularly praised elements of the set and costume design, as well as the editing for "really [ramping] up the tension" towards the climax.

Reviewing "Lunarville 7", "Crater 101" and "Dangerous Rendezvous" for Andersonic, Vincent Law wrote positively of various aspects of "Crater 101". He noted that the episode's "discordant" incidental music implies "something ominous" about Frazer and praised the scene of Scarlet "[making] a grab for the crystal" for demonstrating the puppet's mobility. Law also praised the role of Lieutenant Green in both "Lunarville 7" and "Crater 101", writing that the character is given an opportunity to "get his feet stuck in on the action", and applauding the scene in which Green destroys the master sentry vehicle. Andrew Thomas of Dreamwatch magazine regarded the sentry vehicles as an example of the series' occasionally "shoddy" miniature model work, commenting that they "look disturbingly like something out of Michael Bentine's Potty Time."

Writer Fred McNamara praised the episode, suggesting that it lacks the "wistful impact" of its precursor but commending Turner's "superb" direction, arguing that the scenes inside the Mysteron base feature "some of the most spellbinding visuals ever seen in Captain Scarlet and the Mysterons." McNamara also complimented the use of point-of-view shots and Green's expanded role. His review was not without criticisms, calling the resolution involving the CB29 space probe "rather trite" and the supporting characters poorly written (especially Frazer, who after delivering the sabotaged bomb is never seen again). Nevertheless, McNamara viewed "Crater 101" as the "high point" of the three-episode story arc beginning with "Lunarville 7".

The British Board of Film Classification certified the episode U, noting that it contains "infrequent, very mild" violence.
