= Flight to Atlantica =

- Captain Scarlet and the Mysterons episode
- Episode no.: Episode 20
- Directed by: Leo Eaton
- Written by: Tony Barwick
- Cinematography by: Ted Catford
- Editing by: Harry MacDonald
- Production code: SCA 28
- Original air date: 24 March 1968

Guest character voices
- Gary Files as Commander Williams; Shane Rimmer (uncredited) as Maxwell Field Sergeant

Episode chronology
| ← Previous "Fire at Rig 15" | Next → "Crater 101" |

"Flight to Atlantica" is the 20th episode of Captain Scarlet and the Mysterons, a British Supermarionation television series created by Gerry and Sylvia Anderson and filmed by their production company Century 21 Productions. Written by Tony Barwick and directed by Leo Eaton, it was first broadcast on 24 March 1968 on ATV London.

Set in 2068, the series depicts a "war of nerves" between Earth and the Mysterons: a hostile race of Martians with the power to create functioning copies of destroyed people or objects and use them to carry out acts of aggression against humanity. Earth is defended by a military organisation called Spectrum, whose top agent, Captain Scarlet, was murdered by the Mysterons and replaced by a reconstruction that later broke free of their control. Scarlet's double has a self-healing power that enables him to recover from injuries that would be fatal to anyone else, making him Spectrum's best asset in its fight against the Mysterons.

In "Flight to Atlantica", the personnel of Spectrum Cloudbase take leave of their senses after drinking champagne that has been drugged by the Mysterons. While flying a military bomber in this intoxicated state, Captains Blue and Ochre launch an attack on the World Navy base Atlantica.

== Plot ==
On 7 July, Captain Scarlet holds an unauthorised champagne party on Cloudbase to mark the first anniversary of the founding of Spectrum. The gathering is broken up by Colonel White, who reprimands the personnel for their indiscipline.

Transmitting to Earth, the Mysterons vow to destroy the undersea World Navy base Atlantica. In view of this threat, Spectrum take over an operation to bomb and disperse a wreck that is drifting towards the base. Captains Blue and Ochre are selected to carry out the mission and briefed at Maxwell Field, where they conduct themselves with uncharacteristic flippancy and absent-mindedness. Before taking off in their V17 bomber, they encounter a man whom they fail to recognise as Captain Black, who switches their flight plan.

Meanwhile, on Cloudbase, everyone except White and Scarlet falls into a trance-like state. White and Scarlet realise that the champagne consumed at the party is to blame and that they are both unaffected because neither of them drank any (White did not attend and Blue accidentally knocked over Scarlet's glass). They discover that the Mysterons have used their powers to spike the champagne with a pest control chemical that is known to cause amnesia and reckless behaviour.

Not realising the consequences of their new flight plan, the intoxicated Blue and Ochre take the V17 into Atlantica's airspace and bomb the base's defence control tower. Alerted by Maxwell Field, White and Scarlet intercept Blue and Ochre in a Spectrum Passenger Jet and fire an air-to-air missile at the V17, crippling the aircraft just before Blue and Ochre can bomb Atlantica itself. Blue finally comes to his senses and ejects himself and Ochre moments before the V17 crashes into the ocean and explodes on the seabed.

Despite the Mysterons' partial success, the Cloudbase personnel have cause for celebration on 10 July, for this is Spectrum's true anniversary: although its charter was drawn up on 7 July the previous year, the organisation was not officially created until the World President signed the document three days later. To mark the occasion, White arranges a second, fully sanctioned party with several more bottles of champagne – which, to Scarlet's delight, have his codename emblazoned on the label.

== Regular voice cast ==
- Ed Bishop as Captain Blue
- Cy Grant as Lieutenant Green
- Donald Gray as Colonel White and the Mysterons
- Janna Hill as Symphony Angel
- Francis Matthews as Captain Scarlet
- Jeremy Wilkin as Captain Ochre

== Production ==
"Flight to Atlantica" is one of two Captain Scarlet episodes (the other being "Attack on Cloudbase") to feature all of the regular puppet characters, although not all of them have speaking parts. It is also one of several scripts by Tony Barwick to include a mention of 10 July – a date that Barwick liked to reference in his work, since that was his birthday.

The V17 scale model was a re-use of the RTL Transporter from the Thunderbirds episode "The Cham-Cham". While flying the V17, Blue and Ochre listen to a radio broadcast of "Dangerous Game", an instrumental composed for the same episode.

The outside of Maxwell Field Air Base is a reuse of the command building at Glenn Field from Thunderbirds Are Go.

== Reception ==
Geoff Willmetts of the website Sfcrowsnest regards "Flight to Atlantica" as ("story-wise") one of the best episodes of the series, arguing that it "would work in any medium". He adds that it marks "one of the rare times when the Spectrum captains are less than formal, with elements of arrogance and slaphappy showing how well disciplined they normally are."

Shane M. Dallmann of Video Watchdog magazine describes the episode as "amusing" and adds that it contains "plenty of character-breaking moments". He expresses surprise that Scarlet is "treated as a hero" in the final scene given that it was he who organised the unauthorised champagne party (an "unbelievably bone-headed blunder" on his part) and could therefore be considered indirectly responsible for the near-total destruction of Atlantica.

Noting its "offbeat" tone and praising its humour, writer Fred McNamara comments that the episode "rarely outstays its welcome" and sums it up as a "valiantly joyful excursion into unforeseen territory" for the series. He describes the party scenes at the beginning as a "charming dollop of character-focused exposition" and calls the "subversion" of Blue and Ochre's characters a "joy to behold", but considers the scenes of Scarlet and White's investigative work less interesting.
