= The Mysterons =

1967 episode of Captain Scarlet and the Mysterons

- Captain Scarlet and the Mysterons episode
- The Mysteron double of Captain Scarlet holds the World President hostage.
- Episode no.: Episode 1
- Directed by: Desmond Saunders
- Written by: Gerry & Sylvia Anderson
- Cinematography by: Julien Lugrin
- Editing by: Len Walter
- Production code: SCA 1
- Original air date: 29 April 1967

Guest character voices
- Paul Maxwell as; World President: Charles Tingwell as; Captain Brown Lieutenant Dean Spectrum Helicopter A42 Pilot Spectrum Headquarters, London: Jeremy Wilkin as; Human Captain Black Delta Garage Attendant Radio Speaker

Episode chronology
← Previous —	Next → "Winged Assassin"

"The Mysterons" (also known as "Mars – 2068 A.D.") is the first episode of Captain Scarlet and the Mysterons, a British Supermarionation television series created by Gerry and Sylvia Anderson and filmed by their production company Century 21 Productions (originally AP Films or APF). Written by the Andersons and directed by Desmond Saunders, it was first officially broadcast on 29 September 1967 on ATV Midlands, although it had received an unscheduled test screening in the London area five months earlier.

Set in 2068, the series depicts a "war of nerves" between Earth and the Mysterons: a hostile race of Martians with the ability to create functioning copies of destroyed people or objects and use these reconstructions to carry out specific acts of aggression against humanity. Earth is defended by a military organisation called Spectrum, whose top agent, Captain Scarlet, was murdered by the Mysterons and replaced with a reconstruction that later broke free of their control. The double of Scarlet has powers of self-repair that enable him to recover from injuries that would be fatal to any other person, which make him Spectrum's best asset in its fight against the Mysterons.

The first episode begins with a crew of human astronauts destroying the Mysteron city on Mars, after which the Mysterons reconstruct the settlement and declare war on humanity. On Earth, Captain Scarlet and fellow Spectrum officer Captain Brown are killed in a car crash and replaced with Mysteron doubles programmed to carry out the aliens' first threat – to assassinate the World President.

"The Mysterons" was filmed in January 1967. The finished episode differs significantly from the Andersons' "pilot" script, especially with regard to Scarlet's biology as a Mysteron double. Patrick McGoohan was intended to voice the World President but scheduling conflicts and budget constraints prevented his casting. The episode was well received by the voice cast after it was completed and has since been praised by critics. It has drawn comment for its levels of violence, particularly during a scene in which Brown's double physically explodes. The episode was adapted into an audio play in 1967 and novelised in 1993.

== Plot ==
In 2068, the crew of the Zero-X spacecraft are investigating the surface of Mars in their lander, the Martian Exploration Vehicle (MEV). Their mission is to locate the source of unidentified radio signals detected by the Spectrum security organisation on Earth. The source is revealed to be an alien city inhabited by the Mysterons, a collective artificial intelligence with partial control over matter. The astronauts mistake the Mysterons' surveillance devices for gun batteries, and the mission leader, Spectrum officer Captain Black, orders his men to fire on the city with the MEV's rocket launcher. Although the city is obliterated, the Mysterons use their powers to undo the damage. They then take control of Black and declare a "war of nerves" on Earth, stating that their first retaliatory act will be to assassinate the World President. (Note: At the start of the episode, Captain Black has a healthy complexion and speaks with a North American accent. After he is taken over, his appearance is unnaturally pallid and he speaks in the slow, echoing tones of the Mysterons.) When the Zero-X returns to Earth, Black mysteriously disappears.

Captains Scarlet and Brown are assigned to escort the President to the Spectrum Maximum Security Building in New York City. However, they are both killed when the Mysterons engineer the crash of their Spectrum Patrol Car. (Note: The Mysteron presence is indicated by the picture slowly changing from full colour to blue monochrome. As Captain Scarlet was originally broadcast in black and white, this effect was lost during the episode's early transmissions (Bentley 2001, p. 59).) From the officers' corpses, the Mysterons create living doubles programmed to carry out their threat against the President. The aliens make their first attempt on the target's life by using Brown as a living bomb, detonating him inside the Maximum Security Building. Although the building is destroyed, the President escapes unhurt.

On Spectrum's airborne headquarters, Cloudbase, the organisation's commander-in-chief Colonel White concludes that Brown had a bomb on his person. Unaware that the original Scarlet is dead, White orders his double to fly the President in a Spectrum Passenger Jet to a second Maximum Security Building in London. However, when Brown's body is discovered at the scene of the car crash, White realises that the President is in the hands of an impostor and orders Scarlet to return to Cloudbase. Ignoring the command, Scarlet ejects himself and the President over southern England, steals a car and sets off towards London holding the President hostage.

Arriving at a garage, Captain Blue exchanges his patrol car for a Spectrum Pursuit Vehicle (SPV) and begins to follow Scarlet. Meanwhile, Spectrum's Angel fighter squadron destroy a bridge to force Scarlet to a dead end at the top of the London Car-Vu, an 800-foot-tall (240 m) car parking structure comprising a spiral road that leads up to an open-top parking platform. Watching from a nearby building, Captain Black telepathically instructs Scarlet to await the arrival of Spectrum Helicopter A42, which has been hi-jacked by the Mysterons and will pick up Scarlet and the President. Reaching the top of the Car-Vu, Blue dons a jet pack and engages Scarlet in a shootout with Spectrum-issue handguns. He is fired on by the helicopter, which is shot down by Destiny Angel and crashes into the Car-Vu, fatally damaging the structure. Blue shoots Scarlet, who falls 800 feet from the Car-Vu. Blue lifts the President to safety just before the Car-Vu collapses.

On Cloudbase, White announces that the Mysteron plot has been thwarted. He then reveals that Scarlet's double has inexplicably recovered from his fatal injuries and is no longer under Mysteron control; White suggests that Scarlet's powers of self-repair make him virtually "indestructible" and that he is destined to become Spectrum's greatest asset against the Mysterons.

== Regular voice cast ==
- Ed Bishop as Captain Blue
- Cy Grant as Lieutenant Green
- Donald Gray as Colonel White, Captain Black and the Mysterons
- Francis Matthews as Captain Scarlet
- Liz Morgan as Destiny, Rhapsody and Harmony Angels

== Production ==
=== Writing and design ===
"The Mysterons" was written by the husband-and-wife team of Gerry and Sylvia Anderson, assisted by series script editor Tony Barwick. The Andersons devised the formats and characters of each Supermarionation series and usually wrote the first episode, which was often referred to as the "pilot". The appearance of the Zero-X Martian Exploration Vehicle, first seen in Thunderbirds Are Go (1966), was intended to mark the transition from APF's previous series, Thunderbirds, which is set in the same fictional world as Captain Scarlet.

The "pilot" script, written in August 1966, contained several key differences from the finished episode. For example, it elaborated on Captain Scarlet's new Mysteron nature, stating that the reconstruction is a "mechanical man" rather than true flesh and blood. It also indicated that the defeated Scarlet would be revived by Spectrum using a "specially-designed computer", whereas in the completed episode, he returns to life of his own accord. Other differences included a longer Cloudbase introduction, in which the Angels are launched but subsequent dialogue reveals that this is a drill (in the finished episode, only the launch is shown); an additional scene in which Symphony and Melody Angels watch from the Cloudbase promenade deck as the Spectrum jet takes off; Captain Blue converting the SPV's removable power unit into a personal rotorcraft, or "minicopter", to take on Scarlet (in the finished episode, he wears a jet pack instead); and an additional line of dialogue stating that the original Helicopter A42 crashed half an hour before its reconstruction attacked Blue.

Between pre-production and filming, the approach to voice casting changed. It was originally intended that each episode would feature a "guest star" character voiced by a well-known actor. In the case of the first episode, the World President was to have been voiced by an artist "of the Patrick McGoohan calibre". Although the puppet was modelled on McGoohan, the actor was unable to commit to the role, and the guest star idea was later abandoned due to budget constraints.

As special effects supervisor Derek Meddings was busy working on Thunderbird 6, his designs for "The Mysterons" were limited to the Spectrum vehicles that he expected to appear in more than one episode: Cloudbase, the Angel Interceptors and the SPV. Understanding that the patrol car, Maximum Security Vehicle, passenger jet and helicopter were to be guest vehicles, he delegated the task of designing these to his assistant Mike Trim. The pilot script gave few specifications for the car, jet and helicopter. The car, for example, was described simply as a "modern American saloon car". In the end, Trim's vehicles were so well received by the producers that they, like Meddings', were also included in later episodes. Trim also designed a number of model buildings: the Maximum Security Building, the garage and the Car-Vu. According to Trim, Gerry Anderson had not intended the Car-Vu to look so futuristic, thinking that it would be somewhat reminiscent of the Eiffel Tower instead.

=== Filming and post-production ===
After two months of pre-production, and the renaming of APF to "Century 21 Productions" in December 1966, effects filming began on 2 January 1967 followed by the puppet filming on 16 January. Although "The Mysterons" was the only episode of Captain Scarlet to be directed by Desmond Saunders, he would continue to serve as "supervising" director for the remainder of the series – in part, to guide the new crop of directors that Century 21 had recruited to work on Captain Scarlet. Zero-X astronauts Lieutenant Dean and Navigator Conway were originally played by puppets different from those seen in the finished episode; the MEV scenes were re-shot with another pair of marionettes after it was decided that the original Dean, which had a black wig, could be mistaken for Captain Scarlet.

Because the Maximum Security Building explosion was an important effects sequence, the scale model was carefully designed and built with the effects team paying particular attention to the interiors, as it was thought that miniatures lacking internal detail looked less realistic when blown up. Besides packing the model with fuller's earth to create a dust cloud, the team even added miniature tables and chairs. In the end, however, Meddings and Trim believed that such a large amount of dust was produced that hardly any of this special construction was evident on screen. According to Meddings: "We spent hours furnishing miniature rooms – actually plastic tool box drawers – but when we eventually set off the explosives they created so much dust that we couldn't see a thing, so our efforts were completely wasted."

The script presented other challenges for the puppet workshop and effects teams. To create the blurred, otherworldly look of the Mysteron city, a sheet of glass was placed between the camera and the set; the crew then smeared Vaseline onto various portions of the glass to distort the lighting. A scene in which Captain Brown and the President are scanned for concealed weapons while travelling down a moving walkway was especially difficult to film as the puppet operators on the bridge above the set had to synchronise their movements with the conveyor belt beneath them. The complicated model shots of Blue's SPV travelling up the Car-Vu's spiral road were simplified by rotating the set rather than the SPV itself, thus eliminating the need move the camera or pull the model on wires. As the wired Helicopter A42 model could not easily be filmed right side up due to its spinning blades, it was upended and flown on wires attached to its underside; the footage was then horizontally flipped in post-production. The scene of Blue shooting Scarlet includes a reaction shot that required the brief appearance of a "grimacing" Scarlet head, which was sculpted especially for this episode. Meddings said that the sequence of the Car-Vu's destruction was among the most complex that he and his team created on any of the Anderson productions, and therefore needed extensive planning. In a DVD audio commentary, Gerry Anderson recalled that as "The Mysterons" was the first episode to be filmed, "everything had to be perfect" on a technical level. The episode features more than 120 special effects shots.

The incidental music was performed by a 16-member band and recorded by series composer Barry Gray during a four-hour studio session held on 16 March 1967.

The opening shot presents a caption that reads "Mars – 2068 A.D." Although some sources regard this as the title caption, all production documentation names the episode "The Mysterons". Chris Bentley rejects "Mars – 2068 A.D." as the title, noting that the title captions in later episodes use a different version of the series' customary Microgramma font.

== Broadcast ==
The finger is on the trigger. About to unleash a force with terrible powers, beyond the comprehension of man. This force we shall know as "the Mysterons" ... This man will be our hero, for fate will make him indestructible. His name: Captain Scarlet. ... This is the trigger: a Martian Exploration Vehicle. Inside, three men from Earth ...

— Title narration, unique to the episode, by Ed Bishop as Captain Blue

"The Mysterons" was first broadcast as an unscheduled, late-night test transmission on 29 April 1967. This was restricted to the London area and did not include an advert break. When it officially premiered on 29 September 1967 on ATV Midlands, it attracted an audience of 0.45 million – a number considered "promising". This was followed by showings on ATV London on 1 October and Granada Television on 5 October. The episode had its first UK colour broadcast on 27 December 1969 on ATV.

The episode's first UK-wide transmission was on BBC2 on 1 October 1993. It drew 4.17 million viewers, making it the channel's third most-watched programme of the week. In January 2008, the episode was screened as part of a Gerry Anderson-themed night of programming on BBC Four, when it was seen by 0.35 million (an audience share of 1.54 per cent).

As originally edited, the episode shows the MEV crew firing on the Mysteron city only after they mistake the movements of the aliens' surveillance towers as preparations for an attack. Further, a Mysteron voice-over during this scene states that the humans are welcome and alludes to rotating the towers merely to "take a closer look" at the MEV. When Captain Scarlet was repeated on Central Television in the 1980s, the scene was altered to remove the voice-over, making the Mysterons seem more aggressive.

== Reception ==
The episode was positively received by members of the voice cast and their families when they attended a preview screening at Century 21 Studios in 1967. Francis Matthews, the voice of Scarlet, recalled that "the moment we heard, 'This is the voice of the Mysterons,' my eldest son ran screaming from the room, but my other son just sat there, riveted." He added that Reg Hill, the series' producer, "said, 'Oh my God, what have we done? We've made a series that no children are going to watch!'" The episode was also given a cinema-style screening at the Columbia Theatre on London's Shaftesbury Avenue, which actor Gary Files, who voiced supporting characters in later episodes, fondly remembered: "I looked at [the episode] with total and utter amazement ... Boy, you should have seen it on the wide screen! They had laid in an incredible soundtrack to go with it ... We all tottered out into the night, convinced that we were on to a winner." In his DVD commentary, Gerry Anderson praised Saunders' direction.

Reviewers in 1993 were satisfied, if somewhat bemused, by the first episode of the then 25-year-old series. In a preview of the episode's first BBC showing, James Rampton of The Independent wrote: "The best thing about the programme is that it's just as ludicrous as you remembered: the lips bizarrely out of sync with the words, the strange uniformity of features [...] and the totally preposterous dialogue ('Despite his fatal injuries, he's returning to life'). Highly recommended." In a review for the same newspaper, Allison Pearson was comically critical of certain design aspects, such as the surface of Mars, the exterior of the Mysteron city and the model of the Car-Vu (which she likened to a "Philippe Starck cake-stand"). However, she also described the episode as being part of a "classic Sixties puppet show."

James Stansfield of the website Den of Geek ranks "The Mysterons" the fourth-best episode of the series, concluding that the first instalment "had it all ... Exciting and dramatic, you knew you'd be watching next week." He particularly praises the episode's "kick-ass action", describing the Car-Vu gunfight as "hair-raising". Stansfield argues that the episode's main theme is one of "misunderstanding, and the consequences of such actions". He points out that the attack on the Mysteron city is motivated by fear of the unknown, which is implied to be an aspect of the human condition: for destruction is "what all humans do when faced with something they know nothing about".

The episode has drawn comment for its levels of violence and destruction. Stephen La Rivière notes the graphic nature of several scenes, such as the murders of the original Scarlet and Brown, Scarlet's bloodied body and the demises of Scarlet's and Brown's Mysteron doubles. Paul Cornell, Martin Day and Keith Topping, authors of The Guinness Book of Classic British TV, highlight Brown's conversion into a living bomb as an example of the sometimes "incredibly violent" tone of the series. Andrew Blair of website Den of Geek calls the explosion of Brown "quite an unnerving thing to watch" but regards the episode in general as "tailor-made to appeal to small boys and men-children". Although the Mysterons ultimately fail to kill the World President, Gary Russell of What DVD magazine points out that their attempts on the target's life result in considerable collateral damage: "[Spectrum] lose three Captains (Scarlet, Brown and Black), a helicopter, a pursuit vehicle and a saloon car. They blow up the M21 and allow half of London to be crushed by the falling Car-Vu." In 2001, the BBFC certified the episode U, noting that it contains a single instance of "very mild" violence.

== Other media ==
"Winged Assassin", "Dangerous Rendezvous" and "Traitor" all contain flashbacks to various scenes in this episode.

In 1967, Century 21 Records released an audio adaptation of the episode in extended play format. Titled Introducing Captain Scarlet, it ends with the discovery that Scarlet's Mysteron double is returning to life and the suggestion (present in the pilot script) that his former loyalties can be restored with the help of an advanced computer.

In 1980, the New York office of distributor ITC Entertainment re-edited the episode to form the opening segment of Captain Scarlet vs. the Mysterons, a made-for-TV Captain Scarlet compilation film. In 1993, a novelisation by Dave Morris was published by Young Corgi.

The first episode of the animated remake, New Captain Scarlet, begins in a similar way. Here, the Mars mission is conducted by Captains Scarlet and Black and the assault on the Mysteron city provokes an immediate counter-strike, in which the Mysterons use their powers to kill Black and injure Scarlet. Later, Black is resurrected by the Mysterons and Spectrum discovers that Scarlet has been left with the Mysteron ability to self-repair. In an interview, Gerry Anderson described this version of the first contact between humanity and the Mysterons as "ten thousand times better than the original – much more exciting, much more real."
