= Terry Jervis =

British media producer, entrepreneur and business executive (born 1962)

- Born: 1962 (age 63–64); Hackney, London, England
- Occupations: Media producer, entrepreneur and business executive
- Notable work: Jervis Media Entertainment
- Website: jervismedia.com

Terry Jervis (born 1962) is a British media producer, entrepreneur and business executive, working for more than three decades across the entertainment industry in film, music and television, having begun his career as a broadcast journalist. Jervis has worked with many high-profile musicians, including Diana Ross, Stevie Wonder, Michael Jackson, Madonna and Elton John. After being employed by the BBC for 20 years, he set up his independent venture Jervis Media Entertainment.

== Biography ==
Jervis was born in Hackney, east London, England, where he grew up in a single-parent family on an estate.

In a 1996 interview with Sarita Malik, he spoke about his start in television, saying: "I actually used to make films on 16mm and Super-8mm back in the late 1970s when I had aspirations of starting my own movie company. I'd made a film called From Gospel To Soul about the life of Sam Cooke and I put it on at a local cinema and a lot of people turned up to see it including people from Channel 4, the BBC, Sam Cooke's daughter and Bobby Womack, totally uninvited. Then Channel 4 gave me a call and said we're launching this new station..., 'Would you like to come on board with a couple of productions we have at the moment?' So I did." Before long, Jervis joined the BBC, where he worked for 15 years, running his own department at the age of 27, and counting among his successes as producer/director the comedy show The Real McCoy. Among other widely viewed BBC programmes he created are the Black music magazine programme Behind the Beat (1987–91) and Our Common Future.

In 1999, Jervis set up his own production company, Jervis Entertainment Media (JEM), continuing to provide programming that won critical acclaim. Documentary shows he that directed include Raising Tennis Aces: The Williams Story, about the relationship of tennis stars Venus and Serena Williams with their father Richard. Other initiatives by Jervis included his Motown-linked record label, Down To Jam, and animation projects such as the calypso-based Tropical Island.

Jervis has also been concerned to commemorate the contributions of Africans, West Indians and other people of colour in the Second World War, including former RAF officer Cy Grant.

A photograph of Jervis was one of those featured in the 2019 National Portrait Gallery exhibition Black is the New Black: Portraits by Simon Frederick.
