= Cloudbase =

Fictional airborne headquarters of Spectrum

- Captain Scarlet and the Mysterons vehicle
- First appearance: "The Mysterons" (29 September 1967)

Information
- Affiliation: Spectrum Organisation
- Auxiliary vehicles: Angel Interceptors; Spectrum Passenger Jets, helicopters, Magnacopters; Gyroscopic escape pods

General characteristics
- Propulsion: Hover combines; Anti-gravity compensators; Jet cloud conversion engines for flight
- Power: Nuclear reactor; Solar energy panels
- Mass: 87,000 tons or 4.52 million pounds (2,050 tonnes)
- Length: 630 feet (190 m)
- Width: 330 feet (100 m)
- Height: 130 feet (40 m)
- Population volume: 593 personnel

Spectrum Cloudbase, often shortened to Cloudbase, is the fictional airborne headquarters of the international security organisation Spectrum in the science fiction television series Captain Scarlet and the Mysterons (1967–1968). In the 2005 animated remake, Cloudbase is re-imagined as Skybase.

In both series, the base's design is that of an airborne aircraft carrier, stationed in either the high troposphere (in the original series) or low stratosphere (remake).

== Origin and design ==
While developing the series in 1966, Gerry Anderson recalled that during the Battle of Britain, the RAF had found it difficult to counter the Luftwaffe due to the delays caused by having to launch fighters from the ground: "[I]t took [the Spitfire squadron] about 20 minutes to climb high enough to intercept the bombers that were already at 16,000 feet." For this reason, Anderson decided to make the fictional Spectrum's headquarters a floating aircraft carrier: "This could launch aircraft that would then climb to 100,000 feet and intercept extraterrestrial invaders within minutes."

Anderson also noted that Captain Scarlet was made during the Cold War, "when world leaders held conferences on aircraft carriers, and bomber pilots were constantly in the air waiting for attack orders. So I was thinking along the lines of a wartime setting, and had the idea for Cloudbase, a giant flying aircraft carrier, and the Angels, fighter pilots ready for take-off at any time. The script for the first episode stated that the base is kept airborne by "powerful jet engines that are pointing downwards and are obviously powered by atomic energy".

The Cloudbase filming model was designed by special effects director Derek Meddings and measured over six feet (1.8 m) in length. According to Meddings, it was the easiest Captain Scarlet vehicle to build. The base's wide-angle establishing shot, repeatedly re-used as stock footage, was filmed against a sky backdrop consisting of a background painting, cotton wool clouds and dry ice effects. Too heavy to be hung on wires, the model was held in place on the end of a horizontal metal pole. Larger-scale sections of the flight deck were built for scenes showing aircraft taking off and landing.

The puppet-size control room set incorporated green Perspex arches and a 15-foot-long (4.6 m) electrically-driven moving walkway from which Lieutenant Green is shown to operate the base's main computer. Anderson said that the decision to have Colonel White sit at a round desk, so that during briefings all the attendees are equidistant from him, was influenced by contemporary speculation about the seating arrangements for cabinet meetings, which were typically held at long conference tables and reportedly led to arguments over which members should be seated closest to the head of government.

== Depiction ==
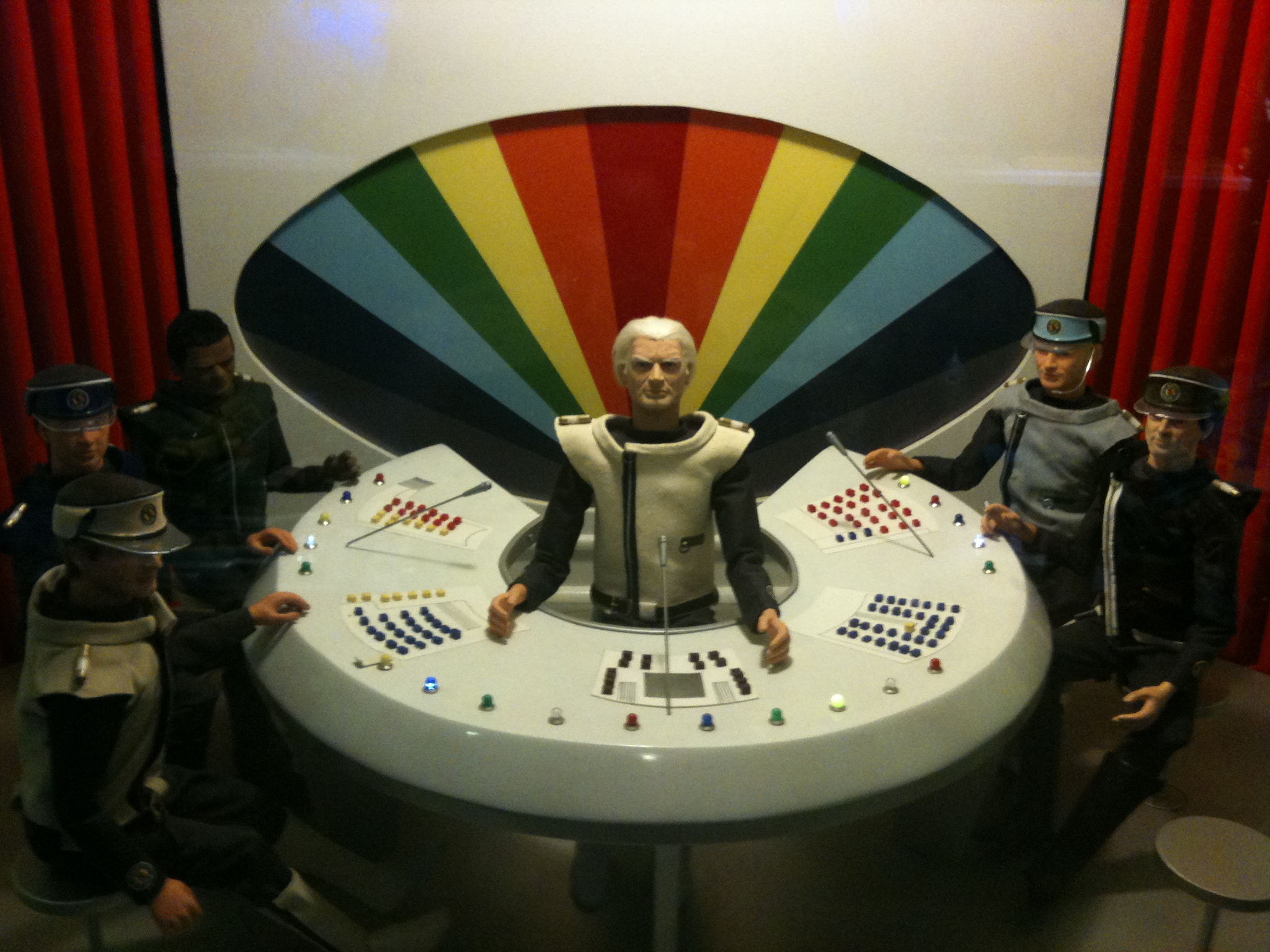
Replica Cloudbase control room at The Time Machine Museum in Bromyard, England, with Colonel White in the centre

An airborne aircraft carrier, incorporating a flight deck and powered by jet engines, Cloudbase hovers at a fixed altitude of 40,000 feet (7.6 mi; 12 km). Though usually geostationary, it is equipped with horizontal jet thrusters that enable it to be moved to any point above the Earth's surface. It was constructed in Earth orbit and has a crew of approximately 600. The base is pressurised; pilots entering or exiting aircraft on the flight deck do so via airtight shafts and docking ports.

Cloudbase's main defence is its squadron of three Angel Interceptor fighter aircraft, flown by five female pilots. One fighter is crewed around the clock, with the others on continuous standby. Auxiliary aircraft include Spectrum Passenger Jets and Magnacopters, which are launched from a different area of the flight deck.

Areas aboard Cloudbase include:

- the Control Room, which contains Colonel White's revolving round desk, a viewing screen (which displays the spectral colours when inactive) and Lieutenant Green's mainframe computer, which manages the base's systems
- the Amber Room, the standby lounge for the Angel pilots
- a sick bay, staffed by chief medical officer Dr Fawn
- the Spectrum Information Centre, a data bank powered by "seventh-generation" supercomputers
- an observation room, containing atmospheric and space-monitoring equipment
- the Room of Sleep, a dormitory with hypnotic aids and gimbal-mounted beds to minimise the amount of time needed for personnel to rest
- a conference room, generator room, radar room and crew lounge

== Reception ==
According to James Chapman, Cloudbase's design evokes the style of Eagle comic's Dan Dare strips. Ian Fryer praises the interior sets designed by Keith Wilson, noting their use of coloured Perspex and describing them as "both stylish and highly detailed". Fred McNamara likens the control room design to "being inside some vast mechanical brain", arguing that in this way, the base is depicted as a "technological utopia".

Cloudbase has also been viewed as part of a supposed religious allegory. Commentators have suggested that the base can be interpreted as Heaven, with Colonel White serving as a God analogue and the resurrected Captain Scarlet representing the Son of God; the Devil is symbolised by either Captain Black or the Mysterons. Both Robin Turner of Wales Online and Chris Jenkins of Total DVD magazine compare White to God seated in his "heavenly Cloudbase" (defended by a fighter squadron codenamed "the Angels"). Anderson denied that any of this symbolism was intentional.

Sources have discussed the base's feasibility as a hovering aircraft carrier. Using the material specifications of a Nimitz-class aircraft carrier, an article published by the University of Leicester calculated that if Cloudbase were a uniformly dense cuboid, it would weigh in excess of 30 billion newtons (3.1 million tf) when hovering, needing thruster power equivalent to more than half a million Eurofighter Typhoons and the equivalent energy output of more than 600,000 nuclear power stations to maintain its altitude. The article concluded that the phenomenal weight, noise and heat created by such power requirements made Cloudbase a real-world impossibility.

According to aviation consultant Jim Smith, Cloudbase would not be practical as a carrier if stationary, because the Angel Interceptors make "controlled crash" landings on ramps at speeds that would be fatal unless the base were moving. He wrote: "Operating from a static Cloudbase simply makes no sense, because you won't be able to land back on board. A conventional carrier landing from an approach speed of [over] 200 knots (230 mph; 370 km/h) is not going to work. The alternative of pitching up to 30 degrees to land on a ramp at 100 knots will not work either. If Cloudbase were moving at 100 knots or so during the landing sequence, then a conventional carrier landing using arrestor wires would be possible, and would be a more flexible and less dangerous solution than the inclined ramp."

The Valiant, an airborne aircraft carrier featured in the Doctor Who universe, has been compared to Cloudbase. The similarity is directly recognised in the series 8 episode "Death in Heaven", in which the Twelfth Doctor refers to the Valiant as "Cloudbase". Comparisons have also been drawn with the Marvel Universe's Helicarrier, the mobile airstrip in the 2004 film Sky Captain and the World of Tomorrow, and the eponymous floating academy of the 2005 film Sky High.

In 1993, toy company Vivid Imaginations released a Cloudbase playset. In 2001, The Independent listed it as one of the 50 best Christmas toys. The Toy Retailers Association also ranked it among the top 50 toys of the year. A secret project in the expansion pack for the 1999 video game Sid Meier's Alpha Centauri is titled "Cloudbase Academy".

== Skybase ==
In the animated remake New Captain Scarlet (2005), Cloudbase is re-imagined as Skybase. Stationed at 60,000 feet (11 mi; 18 km), the base includes robotic deckhands on its flight deck to assist with the take-off and landing of aircraft, as well as new recreational facilities such as squash courts. It is protected by a fleet of Falcon Interceptors, the updated Angel aircraft.

On the series' first announcement in 2003, Anderson stated that the new Cloudbase would be "bigger and better" than the original. He later said that the changes from the original were for commercial reasons, "so that merchandising opportunities aren't confused and all the revenue goes to another company." He likened the role of the deckhands to "a Formula One pit stop".

Skybase's CGI model was created using LightWave 3D software under the supervision of Ron Thornton, co-founder of Foundation Imaging. Comprising three million polygons (described by Thornton as "way over the top"), it was three times the size of the Enterprise NX-01 model that Foundation had created for Star Trek: Enterprise, and was too large to be rendered in a single step.
