= Mike Hayley =

British comedian

Mike Hayley is a British actor, comedian, impressionist and writer. He starred alongside Susie Blake, Caroline Leddy, James Gaddas, Mike Doyle in the BBC's sketch show, Something for the Weekend (1989) and Shane Richie, David Schneider, Suzy Aitchison, Frances Dodge, & Lewis MacLeod in Up to Something (1990).

He and Alan Francis wrote the play Jeffrey Dahmer is Unwell, taking it to the Edinburgh Festival in 1995. He also co-presented the Emotional Collection at the Gilded Balloon with Rhona Cameron at the Edinburgh Festival before this.

He provided the voice of Colonel White in the CGI remake of New Captain Scarlet and has had minor roles in several big budget films, including the 2000 film 102 Dalmatians, directed by Kevin Lima as well as small budget films like 'The End of the World' where he plays a man who causes the apocalypse. He has written material for Jasper Carrot. He also voiced Chopper in the video game, Clock Tower 3.

Hayley is one of the regular performers at Jongleurs, a stand-up comedy club in London.

== Sources ==
- Mike Hayley at IMDb
- Whatsonstage.com: http://www.whatsonstage.com/dl/page.php?page=details&id=L132356246
