= New Captain Scarlet =

2005 British action-adventure TV series

- Also known as: Gerry Anderson's New Captain Scarlet
- Genre: Science fiction
- Created by: Gerry Anderson
- Based on: Captain Scarlet and the Mysterons
- Written by: John Brown; Brian Finch; Phil Ford
- Directed by: David Lane; Dominic Lavery; Mark Woollard
- Voices of: Julia Brahms; Jules de Jongh; Wayne Forester; Mike Hayley; Jeremy Hitchen; Nigel Plaskitt; William Roberts; Robbie Stevens; Emma Tate; Heather Tobias; Suzy Westerby; Glenn Wrage
- Music by: Crispin Merrell
- Country of origin: United Kingdom
- Original language: English
- No. of series: 2
- No. of episodes: 26

Production
- Executive producers: Nigel Jealous; Jim Reeve; James Clay; Margot Ricketts
- Producer: Gerry Anderson
- Editor: Andy Walter
- Running time: 22 minutes
- Production companies: Anderson Entertainment for Gerry Anderson Productions; The Indestructible Production Company
- Budget: £22 million

Original release
- Network: ITV
- Release: 12 February – 26 November 2005

Related
- Captain Scarlet and the Mysterons

New Captain Scarlet is a British animated remake of the 1960s Supermarionation series Captain Scarlet and the Mysterons. Both series were produced by Gerry Anderson. As a nod to Supermarionation, the new series' animation was promoted as "Hypermarionation". It was the last show that Anderson produced.

The series premiered on the ITV network in February 2005. Instead of having its own timeslot, each episode of New Captain Scarlet was shown within the children's Saturday morning children television show, Ministry of Mayhem. Anderson was unhappy with this scheduling decision, claiming the show was ignored.

The Radio Times said fans "felt the essence of the show had been pixelated away", while The Register called the series a "rehash".

== Premise ==
In the year 2068, peace on Earth is maintained by the Spectrum Organization, a super-efficient security group, headquartered in the vast floating aircraft carrier Skybase, which hovers on the edge of Earth's atmosphere. Spectrum is staffed by agents recruited from various military services, who are each assigned colour codenames to hide their true identities. Under the command of Colonel White, Spectrum has become the supreme peacekeeping force, maintaining a fleet of sophisticated vehicles for use by Spectrum field agents.

A mission to locate the source of mysterious signals originating from Mars unleashed the power of the Mysterons, a ruthless alien consciousness. When Spectrum Captains Scarlet and Black discovered the Mysteron city on Mars, Black mistook the intentions of a probe for a hostile offensive and opened fire, completely destroying the city. Using their power of retrometabolism (the ability to recreate matter), the Mysterons rebuilt their city, killed Black, and promised to crush Earth and its destructive people. This has taken the form of a war of nerves, with the Mysterons using their powers to influence people, vehicles and inanimate objects to fall under their control.

The Mysterons' primary Earth agent is Captain Black, recreated from the body of the original Spectrum agent. Captain Scarlet was also engineered to become an agent of destruction, but the Mysterons' hold over him was broken after he fell through a power conduit in the Skybase engineering section. Retaining the original man's memories, personality and loyalties, the new Captain Scarlet also retains the Mysteron ability to survive injuries that would prove fatal to any other person. Spectrum's personnel and facilities are now mainly mobilised to combat the threat of the Mysterons, with Captain Scarlet as their greatest weapon.

== Characters ==
=== Spectrum personnel ===
- Captain Scarlet (Paul Metcalfe): leading Spectrum field agent. A 32-year-old dual nationality (British/American) former USAF and special forces officer, replaced by a virtually indestructible replicant. His mother was Ann Brightman, a British astrophysicist, while his father, Tom Metcalfe, was an American pilot who later joined the International Space Agency. Voiced by Wayne Forester, motion capture performance by Oliver Hollis.
- Captain Blue (Adam Svenson): 32-year-old American agent. A decorated former US army officer and sportsman. Blue is Captain Scarlet's second partner at Spectrum (after Captain Black) due to Colonel White's insistence. Voiced by Robbie Stevens.
- Destiny Angel (Simone Giraudoux): 29-year-old dual nationality (French/British) Falcon Interceptor pilot and leader of the Spectrum Angels; a former USAF pilot and ISA astronaut. Destiny was in a romantic relationship with Captain Black, something that Scarlet was jealous of because of his closeness to Destiny. Voiced by Emma Tate.
- Colonel White (Sir Charles Grey): Spectrum's commanding officer, a 55-year-old former director of MI6. Voiced by Mike Hayley.
- Lieutenant Green (Serena Lewis): Spectrum's Controller of Operations, a 27-year-old American former UN computer systems development technician. In the Series 2 episode "Proteus" she is offered a promotion to captain, but declines to continue working with White. Voiced by Jules de Jongh.
- Doctor Gold (real name Mason Frost): main doctor on Skybase. Voiced by Nigel Plaskitt.
- Lieutenant Silver (Bethany Craig): Skybase's Australian second communication officer, rotating with Green. Voiced by Emma Tate.
- Captain Ochre: aged 32, Irish. She is a highly trained field agent and an explosives expert who can handle heavy artillery. Voiced by Julia Brahms.
- Captain Grey (Iain Taggart): aged 38, Scottish. Voiced by Robbie Stevens.
- Captain Magenta: aged 28, Italian. A former military police officer. Voiced by Jeremy Hitchen.
- Harmony Angel: Destiny's second-in-command if she is occupied or injured. Aged 26, American. Voiced by Jules de Jongh.
- Rhapsody Angel: aged 28, British. Voiced by Julia Brahms.
- Melody Angel: aged 25, American. Voiced by Heather Tobias.
- Symphony Angel: aged 24, Japanese. Voiced by Jules de Jongh.

=== Mysterons ===
- The Mysterons are the alien enemies of Spectrum from the planet Mars. They have the power of retrometabolism, which means they can kill a person and rebuild them as a weapon under their control. Represented by two green circles when travelling over surfaces on Earth. Voiced by Mike Hayley.
- Captain Black (Conrad Lefkon): lead Mysteron agent, a 33-year-old American former special forces officer and Spectrum agent, replaced by a virtually indestructible replicant. He used to be Scarlet's best friend and partner and dated Destiny Angel. Voiced by Nigel Plaskitt.

== Vehicles ==
=== Spectrum vehicles ===
- Skybase: the airborne headquarters of Spectrum, permanently stationed above the clouds. Skybase is home to a fleet of high-tech Spectrum vehicles, including a squadron of Falcon aircraft. The Falcons are handled using a unique magnetic control system. After landing on the runway, a circular lift lowers the plane into the hangar. Robotic arms automatically re-fuel, and re-arm guns and missiles. Using this system means that the Falcons are always action ready.
- Rhino TRU (based on the Spectrum Pursuit Vehicle of the original Captain Scarlet): the Rhino TRU (Tactical Response Unit) is a 10-wheeled armoured attack vehicle capable of high speed with the help of twin booster jets at the rear. It is armed with two front-mounted twin cannons firing explosive tipped rounds, as well as armour piercing missiles, harpoon guns and magnetic clamp guns. The vehicle can be driven from either side, the steering sliding into position to whoever needs to drive. The driver's cabin has multiple control screens to act as the drivers eyes, as there is no window. Whenever a Rhino is needed on a given mission, Spectrum will use an Albatross to transport the vehicle.
- Cheetah RRV (based on the Spectrum Patrol Car of the original): a rapid response vehicle. The Cheetah has a machine gun concealed inside the front grill. It can travel on its four wheels but also features concealed wings and a tail fin. When powered by the jump jets in its wings and booster jets in the rear, the Cheetah is able to glide over obstructions with ease. In the first series, the wings are used only for landings from Skybase or flying jumps. In the second series was the Cheetah shown to be able to take off from the ground under its own power.
- Stallion Raid Bike: Spectrum's high-speed attack bike. With its pressurised canopy and wings, it can be launched from Skybase. After leaving the runway, the bike free-falls before deploying its wings in stages to glide. As the bike touches the ground, the canopy and wings disengage. Armed with missiles and front-mounted machine guns.
- Albatross SDC: Skybase carries two of these massive VTOL transporter aircraft, which are used to carry vehicles – mainly Rhinos – wherever they are needed in the world. The Rhino can be deployed the moment the Albatross lands, and once it is out, the craft can take off again immediately. The Albatross is equipped with anti-missile acoustic disruptors that make it a hard target to hit, despite his size.
- Falcon Interceptor (the Angel Interceptor in Anderson's earlier series): piloted by the Angel squadron, the White Falcon fighter aircraft are Skybase's main defence. Each Angel pilot has a designated craft. Armament comes in the form of twin 30 mm cannons and a variety of air-to-air and air-to-surface missiles. In emergencies, the front portion can disengage from the main body to form a self-powered escape pod. If the pod fails, there is also an ejector seat.
- Swift Passenger Jet: Spectrum's fast and comfortable passenger jet. Designed primarily for relaxation and off-duty travel, with luxurious living and dining areas, the Swift can also be converted into a fully operational control centre.
- Hummingbird Helicopter: Spectrum's multi-purpose helicopter.
- Skyrider: a single-person, rocket-powered atmospheric transport used on both Earth and Mars.
- Spectrum Space Shuttle: used to transport personnel between the Earth, the Moon and Mars. The shuttle comprises an orbiter and a lander. The orbiter is capable of carrying multiple personnel for long-duration interplanetary flight. The lander is capable of transporting a Bison rover for rapid EVA.

Condor with tail raised for loading

=== Others ===
- Bison Alien Terrain Vehicle: a piloted, high-speed surface rover for off-Earth use. It is a sealed vehicle allowing the operators to drive helmet-less during normal operation. Used on the surfaces of the Moon and Mars.
- Condor Freighter: a civilian multi-purpose, heavy-lift freight aircraft.
- Druzynik Battlewagon: an automated tank armed with a railgun cannon and other weapons.
- Mercury Shuttle: a rail-launched civilian space launch system.
- Vampire Interceptor: a World Air Force interceptor aircraft commandeered by the Mysterons on several occasions.

== Episodes ==
=== Overview ===
| Series | Episodes | Originally released | |
| Series | Episodes | First released | Last released |
|---|---|---|---|
| Test film | | 4 September 2017 (on Blu-ray) | |
| 1 | 13 | 12 February 2005 | 14 May 2005 |
| 2 | 13 | 3 September 2005 | 19 November 2005 |

=== CGI test film ===
In 1999, Anderson supervised the production of a computer-animated test film, Captain Scarlet and the Return of the Mysterons, to explore the possibility of updating some of his 1960s Supermarionation series for a 21st-century audience. The working title was Captain Scarlet – The New Millennium. Produced by Moving Picture Company using a combination of Maya software and motion capture technology, the film features Francis Matthews and Ed Bishop reprising their voice roles of Captains Scarlet and Blue. Set a few years after the Mysterons apparently cease hostilities against Earth, the film sees the reappearance of Captain Black, setting the stage for a revival of the war with Mars. The film was screened at a Fanderson convention in 2000 and a science lecture in 2001. It was released on Blu-ray in 2017.

| Title | Directed by | Written by | Original release date |
|---|---|---|---|
| Captain Scarlet and the Return of the Mysterons | Gerry Anderson & John Needham | Gerry Anderson & John Needham | 4 September 2017 (on Blu-ray) |
The Mysterons renew their vow to destroy all life on Earth. Captain Black appears to have been released from their control and returns to the service of Spectrum. Appearances can be deceptive, however. Soon Captain Scarlet finds himself caught up in a race against time to save the Drontenon power station from Black's Spectrum Patrol Car, which is packed with explosives.

=== Series ===
The success of Captain Scarlet and the Return of the Mysterons led to the development of New Captain Scarlet. The new series was first announced in 2003. Much of its £22 million budget was contributed by private investors under the Enterprise Investment Scheme. For all episodes except the first three, motion-capture photography was completed by the production companies in-house using a 16-camera setup. As a nod to the original Captain Scarlet, which was "filmed in Supermarionation", the opening titles announce the animated remake as being "created in Hypermarionation".

==== Series 1 (2005) ====
| No. overall | No. in series | Title | Directed by | Written by | Original release date | Prod. code |
|---|---|---|---|---|---|---|
| 1 | 1 | "Instrument of Destruction" | David Lane | Phil Ford | 12 February 2005 | 1 |
| 2 | 2 | "Instrument of Destruction" | David Lane | Phil Ford | 19 February 2005 | 2 |
Part 1: Dateline – 2068. When mysterious extraterrestrial signals from the surface of Mars are detected, the world's security organisation, Spectrum, sends its two top agents, Captain Scarlet and Captain Black, to find the source of the unknown signals. There, they discover a cloaked city, which they destroy, fearing themselves under attack. The city rebuilds itself, and the inhabitants, calling themselves the Mysterons, announce that they will destroy humanity with its own violence. Captain Black appears to be killed, and Captain Scarlet returns to Earth as the Mysterons' instrument of destruction. Part 2: The Mysterons resurrect Captain Black, who gains control of a worldwide distribution company and a Russian military leader. With the latter, they launch an all-out attack against Skybase, whilst with the former, they transport enough nuclear material to Siberia to create a bomb large enough to crack the world wide open. Meanwhile, Captain Scarlet, who is now back to his old self, must earn Captain Blue's trust as they must work together to stop Captain Black. Meanwhile, Black's former lover, Destiny Angel, must come to terms with the fact that the man she once loved is now in league with the enemy.
| 3 | 3 | "Swarm" | David Lane | Phil Ford | 26 February 2005 | 8 |
The Angels shoot down a United States Air Force transport plane that was heading for a collision course with Skybase, but it releases a swarm of cyberbugs, advanced robots the size of a bug that are capable of eating metal and reproducing with great speed. Once they are aboard Skybase, they set about eating their way towards the atomic reactor core. The headquarters will be destroyed unless Captain Scarlet can find a weakness.
| 4 | 4 | "Rat Trap" | Dominic Lavery | Phil Ford | 5 March 2005 | 7 |
Three weeks after losing contact with Elysium Base on Mars, a rescue team consisting of Captain Scarlet, Captain Blue, Destiny Angel, Harmony Angel and Doctor Gold are sent to find out what happened to the base's crew. On arrival, they find everyone in Base Elysium dead and realise they have walked into a trap. The Spectrum rescue team come under attack from a titanium armour-plated research robot named Remote Acquisition Technology (RAT) which carries lasers and a diamond-tipped saw. Now under Mysteron control, the RAT has become the ultimate killing machine.
| 5 | 5 | "The Homecoming" | David Lane | Phil Ford | 12 March 2005 | 5 |
A space capsule escape pod from the Endeavour II, a crewed mission to Jupiter which mysteriously disappeared fifteen years ago, returns to Earth with Lieutenant Green's father, Commander Lewis, aboard. Believed lost, he wastes no time catching up with his daughter, but when he arrives for his debriefing at the International Space Agency, he is revealed as a Mysteron agent and takes Green hostage inside a bunker containing an antimatter reactor that is rigged to blow, leaving nothing but a smoking hole from California to Texas and taking 8 million people with it.
| 6 | 6 | "Mercury Falling" | Dominic Lavery | Phil Ford | 19 March 2005 | 4 |
Captain Blue and Destiny Angel pilot the International Space Agency shuttle Mercury on a top-secret mission into space. They are to deploy a new satellite into Earth orbit, which will provide early warning of an imminent attack by identifying Mysteron energy on Mars. However, just as 'Mercury' achieves orbit, the shuttle's controls are taken over by an outside force, and its systems lock onto a new flight path. Spectrum then receives a transmission from an unidentified extortionist who demands a ransom of $50 million in diamonds or else they will initiate Mercury's re-entry over North America and crash the shuttle onto Washington, DC. Captain Scarlet must discover the identity of the blackmailer before Captain Black can turn the situation to his (and the Mysterons') advantage and send the craft on a collision course with the White House.
| 7 | 7 | "Circles of Doom" | Mark Woollard | Brian Finch | 26 March 2005 | 9 |
Captain Black reveals that, using Mysteron technology, he now has control over all the digital systems on Earth and can destroy them at will. The Mysterons then speak through the rogue agent, demanding mankind's surrender in twenty-four hours or else they will trigger a worldwide technological failure that will destroy everyone on the planet. With humanity's surrender as the price, how can Spectrum carry on the fight with weapons that do not work?
| 8 | 8 | "Rain of Terror" | Mark Woollard | John Brown | 9 April 2005 | 3 |
Spectrum becomes involved in a cloud seeding experiment; however, they become desperate and race to stop it when it goes wrong after the Mysterons poison it and send one of the scientists mad with fear. A full test of the process is planned already, and Colonel White is at the centre of it after being knocked unconscious by Captain Black, who disguises himself as a research scientist. If the Mysterons succeed, then they will send millions of people, including Colonel White, insane.
| 9 | 9 | "Skin Deep" | Mark Woollard | John Brown | 16 April 2005 | 12 |
Destiny Angel is kidnapped by Captain Black, and sometime later, it looks as though Destiny has staged a daring robbery of some missile launch codes. It appears that she has turned into a Mysteron agent, but things are not as they appear when Captain Scarlet goes looking for her and finds that her so-called "betrayal" is only the first stage in an attack on Skybase.
| 10 | 10 | "Chiller" | Mark Woollard | Phil Ford | 23 April 2005 | 6 |
In a remote diner in Phoenix, Arizona, Spectrum flight engineer Xander Story makes contact with two Mysteron agents. Story agrees to destroy Spectrum's Skybase in return for the aliens' promise that they will halt their war on mankind – he accepts a fusion bomb in a briefcase and also a large payment. Captain Scarlet gatecrashes the meeting but is shot and killed. Knowing that his body will regenerate, the Mysterons try to engineer Scarlet's destruction in a massive explosion. Captain Blue finds his devastated corpse and takes it to Skybase. Doctor Gold finds that Scarlet's injuries are too severe, and with no sign of the retrometabolisation process taking place, he pronounces the agent dead. While Destiny and Blue grieve for their lost friend, Story plants the bomb on Skybase, set to an hour's delay. In sickbay, Scarlet regains consciousness, only to find that no one can see or hear him, and that he has somehow become intangible, yet somehow he must warn Destiny and Blue about the bomb.
| 11 | 11 | "Trap for a Rhino" | Dominic Lavery | John Brown | 30 April 2005 | 10 |
In the Scottish Highlands, an elderly lady named Mrs Mackenzie is alarmed to see green lights hovering over the nearby Grampian Nuclear Power Station; she reports the incident to the authorities, but no one believes her. When Colonel White learns of the incident, he immediately sends Captain Scarlet and Harmony Angel to investigate. But that turns out to be just what the Mysterons want as the Spectrum SPV Rhino ground vehicle is just what they need to breach the reactor's defences.
| 12 | 12 | "Heist" | Dominic Lavery | Phil Ford | 7 May 2005 | 13 |
Three men kidnap Colonel White's daughter, Victoria and threaten to harm her unless the Colonel uses a Spectrum Rhino and helps them mount an attack on an armoured express train en route to Paris so that they can steal its cargo of $1 billion in gold bullion. But it is all part of a Mysteron plot by Captain Black to incriminate the Colonel in the robbery and thus end his Spectrum career. Whilst Colonel White pretends to go through with the robbery, Captain Scarlet and Captain Blue must get Victoria back.
| 13 | 13 | "The Achilles Messenger" | David Lane | Phil Ford | 14 May 2005 | 11 |
Captain Scarlet and Destiny Angel are at a Spectrum Training Base in Castle Balmeath, Scotland. The base commander, Astrid Winters, is turned into a Mysteron, but tells Scarlet she only wants to help humanity end the war and that she was sent by representatives of a faction of the Mysteron consciousness which believes the war with Earth is a mistake. Winters is willing to pass the secret of defeating the Mysterons to Colonel White alone, but all the forces that the Mysterons can bring to bear will be ranged against her getting that far.

==== Series 2 (2005) ====
| No. overall | No. in series | Title | Directed by | Written by | Original release date | Prod. code |
|---|---|---|---|---|---|---|
| 14 | 1 | "Touch of the Reaper" | Mark Woollard | Phil Ford | 3 September 2005 | 24 |
Two scientists die at chemical research facility – only to be reborn as Mysteron agents, each with the power to kill with a single touch. It is unclear who their target is and where they are both hiding, but it is up to Spectrum agents Captain Scarlet and Captain Blue to find them before they carry out their plans.
| 15 | 2 | "Virus" | David Lane | Phil Ford | 10 September 2005 | 14 |
After several cases of random suicides, an investigation into the latest one leads Captain Blue to inadvertently upload a virus to Skybase's computers. Everyone on the base apart from Captain Scarlet and Destiny Angel are infected by the deadly virus which makes people end their own lives. Scarlet and Destiny must erase the virus before they too become infected.
| 16 | 3 | "Enigma" | Dominic Lavery | Phil Ford | 17 September 2005 | 16 |
The Mysterons send a space ship to Earth and Colonel White sends the Angel fleet to intercept. However their weapons are useless against it. The ship lands in the Northern Territory of Australia and Captains Scarlet, Blue, Ochre and Gray are despatched to investigate only to end up getting teleported into the Mysteron ship. Soon the group end up as victims in a round of Mysteron mind games, unsure of whether or not they will be able to escape.
| 17 | 4 | "Best of Enemies" | David Lane | John Brown | 24 September 2005 | 17 |
In the frozen wastes of Russia, Captain Black steals a prototype organic limpet mine from the Russian Navy Technology Division and ends up being pursued by Captain Scarlet in a Spectrum Rhino. After a brief chase and a fight in the snow, Scarlet and Black end up trapped in the Rhino under frozen ice. With no way to escape, can Scarlet and Black work together to get free?
| 18 | 5 | "Contact" | Mark Woollard | Phil Ford | 1 October 2005 | 15 |
Doctor Phil Bogart, the designer of the devastating Thunder Pulse compression bomb, which is used as a sonic displacement weapon, is killed and reconstructed by the Mysterons. After the Mysteron double steals his invention and goes into hiding, Spectrum turns to his twin brother, Frank Bogart, a convicted criminal who has a telepathic link with his brother.
| 19 | 6 | "Proteus" | Mark Woollard | Phil Ford | 8 October 2005 | 18 |
Captain Scarlet, Colonel White and Lieutenant Green are aboard a new stealth warship going through sea trials. However the Mysterons decide to use the ship for their own ends, by using it to start a war between the US and China.
| 20 | 7 | "Syrtis Major" | Dominic Lavery | Phil Ford | 15 October 2005 | 19 |
Spectrum mounts a raid on the headquarters of Vulcan Industries. Colonel White confronts the board of governors over their recent breach of the Martian Exclusion Directive: despite the fact that the company's durinium mining operation on Syrtis Major Planum was suspended some time ago, a three-man maintenance team recently left for Mars. On learning that all contact with these engineers has since been lost, Colonel White sends Captain Scarlet, Captain Blue, Captain Ochre, Destiny Angel and Doctor Gold to investigate.
| 21 | 8 | "Fallen Angels" | David Lane | Phil Ford | 22 October 2005 | 20 |
After being shot down on a deserted tropical island, Angels Destiny, Harmony and Melody feel like they are in Paradise, until the Mysterons send replicas of modern-day pirates to pry the secret location of the World Summit from them.
| 22 | 9 | "Storm at the End of the World" | Mark Woollard | Phil Ford | 29 October 2005 | 21 |
In the small town of Ragnarok in Alaska, which the Mysterons have destroyed and replicated, Scarlet and Blue are captured and forced to help mine for an ancient meteorite bearing a spore that can kill all life on Earth.
| 23 | 10 | "Duel" | Dominic Lavery | Phil Ford | 5 November 2005 | 22 |
Captain Scarlet must foil a plot by Captain Black to steal a Spectrum Bison vehicle on the Moon, with which he can target any facility. Black's first target is Tranquillity, a lunar spa where Destiny and Lieutenant Green are on vacation.
| 24 | 11 | "Shape Shifter" | David Lane | Phil Ford | 12 November 2005 | 23 |
Captain Scarlet is guarding a particle collider at the Laroux Foundation in Louisiana. When a container tank is hit it releases a gaseous substance with special properties, which the Mysterons use to create an exact copy of Captain Scarlet. After disposing of the real Scarlet, the clone makes his way back to Cloudbase, intent on killing Colonel White. Later, it sets about destroying Skybase and Houston.
| 25 | 12 | "Dominion" | Dominic Lavery | Phil Ford | 19 November 2005 | 26 |
Captain Black claims he is free of the Mysterons' control and suggests Scarlet return with him to Mars in a daring plan to destroy the Mysteron complex. Can Black really can be trusted – or is Scarlet being led into one final lethal trap?
| 26 | 13 | "Grey Skulls" | David Lane | Phil Ford | 26 November 2005 | 25 |
After the Mysterons take over a Phoenix policeman named Rimmer and use him to steal a canister of deadly alien spores brought back by a space probe from Ganymede, Captain Scarlet and Captain Blue are ordered to give chase. But they are thrown off their trail when the Mysterons take over a biker named Brock and use him to carry out the plot instead. Meanwhile, Captain Ochre's Raid Bike is stolen by another biker named Colt.

== Compilation film ==
In 2026, to coincide with the collectors edition blu-ray a specially made compilation film was released as a bonus feature consisting of five episodes cut together.

| Title | Compilation of | Released | Length |
|---|---|---|---|
| The Legend of Captain Scarlet | "Instrument of Destruction: Part 1", "Instrument of Destruction: Part 2", "Enigma", "Best of Enemies" and "Dominion" | 21 September 2026 | 110 mins approx. |

== Release ==
=== Broadcast ===
ITV premiered New Captain Scarlet on the Saturday morning children's entertainment show Ministry of Mayhem. Episodes were split across two parts and shown with truncated opening titles.

Anderson later claimed: "They took my half-hour show, cut the titles off and cut it in half. It wasn't even listed so people who watched Ministry of Mayhem had to wait and watch all the nonsense going on before the first half. When it finished they didn't say there was a second half or when it was going to start. After they had shown all the episodes, legally it had to be cited as a repeat so it never had a premiere. It just broke my heart." In interviews with Den of Geek and Big Finish, Anderson further dismissed Ministry of Mayhem as "a three-hour rubbish show", claimed parents had to "suffer" when New Captain Scarlet was not on-screen, that he was uncredited, and that Ministry of Mayhem "murdered the show".

In the United States, the series aired on Animania HD. International sales rights were handled by Sony Pictures Television and Sony Wonder.

=== Home media ===
==== DVD ====
Both Series 1 and 2 are available on DVD in the UK, the latter being produced under the ITV DVD banner. Individual volumes are available with three or four episodes on each disk and box sets of all volumes from both series are available separately.

Volumes

| DVD title | Number of disc(s) | Number of episodes | DVD release | | |
| DVD title | Number of disc(s) | Number of episodes | Region 1 | Region 2 | Region 4 |
|---|---|---|---|---|---|
| New Captain Scarlet Series 1 Volume 1 | 1 | 4 | —N/a | 17 October 2005 | —N/a |
| New Captain Scarlet Series 1 Volume 2 | 1 | 3 | —N/a | 30 January 2006 | —N/a |
| New Captain Scarlet Series 1 Volume 3 | 1 | 3 | —N/a | 30 January 2006 | —N/a |
| New Captain Scarlet Series 1 Volume 4 | 1 | 3 | —N/a | 30 January 2006 | —N/a |
| New Captain Scarlet Series 2 Volume 1 | 1 | 4 | —N/a | 18 September 2006 | —N/a |
| New Captain Scarlet Series 2 Volume 2 | 1 | 3 | —N/a | 18 September 2006 | —N/a |
| New Captain Scarlet Series 2 Volume 3 | 1 | 3 | —N/a | 18 September 2006 | —N/a |
| New Captain Scarlet Series 2 Volume 4 | 1 | 3 | —N/a | 18 September 2006 | —N/a |

Boxsets

| DVD Title | # of Disc(s) | Year | # of Episodes | DVD release | | |
| DVD Title | # of Disc(s) | Year | # of Episodes | Region 1 | Region 2 | Region 4 |
|---|---|---|---|---|---|---|
| New Captain Scarlet Series One | 4 | 2005 | 13 | —N/a | 17 October 2005 | 7 September 2016 |
| New Captain Scarlet Series Two | 4 | 2005 | 13 | —N/a | 18 September 2006 | 7 September 2016 |
| New Captain Scarlet Series 1 & 2 | 8 | 2006 | 26 | —N/a | 18 September 2006 | —N/a |

==== Blu-ray ====
In December 2014 it was announced on Gerry Anderson's official site that the HD masters of the series which were thought to be lost were located and hopefully to be released on Blu-ray in the future. On 4 September 2017, the series was released on Blu-ray by Network Distributing in a 3-disc set. This release features a new version of the opening and closing credits made by the original series team with Justin T. Lee and represents what it was meant to be but could not be due to time and budget restrictions during the show's original run. The set was re-released by Anderson Entertainment few years later after Network's demise.

A 20th anniversary release is set for release on 21st September, 2026 and will restore the original opening and closing credits for the series plus new extras.

Boxsets

| Blu-ray Title | # of Disc(s) | # of Episodes | Blu-ray release | | |
| Blu-ray Title | # of Disc(s) | # of Episodes | Region A | Region B | Region C |
|---|---|---|---|---|---|
| New Captain Scarlet: The Complete Series | 3 | 26 | —N/a | 4 September 2017 (Region free) | —N/a |
| New Captain Scarlet: The Complete Series Collector's Edition | 4 | 26 | —N/a | 21 September 2026 (Region free) | —N/a |
