= Colonel White =

Fictional character from Captain Scarlet

- Captain Scarlet character
- Colonel White as seen in Captain Scarlet and the Mysterons
- First appearance: "The Mysterons" (29 September 1967)
- Created by: Gerry and Sylvia Anderson
- Designed by: Tim Cooksey (Captain Scarlet and the Mysterons)
- Voiced by: Donald Gray (Captain Scarlet); Mike Hayley (New Captain Scarlet)

In-universe information
- Alias: Robert Snow (Captain Scarlet)
- Occupation: Commander-in-chief of Spectrum
- Spouse: Diana (New Captain Scarlet)
- Children: Victoria (New Captain Scarlet)
- Nationality: British

Colonel White is a character in the 1960s British Supermarionation television series Captain Scarlet and the Mysterons and its 2005 CGI remake, New Captain Scarlet. In both series, he is the commander-in-chief of Spectrum, the security organisation dedicated to defending Earth against the Mysterons, a race of Martians. He is also the commander of Spectrum's airborne headquarters, Cloudbase.

== Conception ==
In a 2001 interview, series creator Gerry Anderson said that his choice of name for the character was a logical extension of the colour-based codenames given to the rest of the puppet cast: "All the colours together add up to white, so their boss would be Colonel White."

The original script for Captain Scarlet's first episode, written by Anderson and his wife Sylvia, described the character's appearance as "an odd mixture of youth and middle age". The face of the puppet character was modelled on its voice actor, Donald Gray.

== Depiction ==
=== Captain Scarlet ===
In the original series, White spends much of his time at his circular desk in the Cloudbase control room. The only episodes in which he is seen to leave the base are "White as Snow", "Spectrum Strikes Back", "Special Assignment" and "Flight to Atlantica". His assistant is Lieutenant Green. Thoroughly dedicated to his work, White expects high levels of discipline from his agents but has complete faith in their abilities.

Very little of White's identity or background is revealed. In the episode "White as Snow" he goes undercover and uses the alias Robert Snow, this being the only time in the series that he refers to himself by any name other than his Spectrum codename.

=== New Captain Scarlet ===
In the 2005 remake, White is a former Royal Marine and SIS agent. He was recruited to the SIS from the Marines and reached the position of director. He subsequently moved on to the UN Security Development Committee, which in turn created Spectrum.

In contrast with his depiction in the original series, he is frequently seen on the move around Skybase (the re-imagined Cloudbase) and elsewhere. His interests include chess, fishing and fencing. He is married to Diana, with whom he has a daughter, Victoria. He has a residence on an estate in Gloucestershire, England.

== Reception ==
In an article on Captain Scarlet and the Mysterons, Jim Sangster and Paul Condon criticised Colonel White's "often desperate attempts to frame even Spectrum's most humiliating defeats as a step forward", describing them as "misjudged and more than a little trite" and one of the "few bad points" of the series. Writing for Starburst magazine, Andrew Pixley and Julie Rogers noted the character's "fatherly" nature and his habit of concluding episodes "with a rather pompous, patriotic speech about how Earth will triumph over the Mysterons."

The character's name has also drawn comment for its colour symbolism. In a 1976 essay titled "Racism in the English Language", Robert B. Moore cited Captain Scarlet as an example of black-and-white dualism, pointing out that while the character who leads the heroic Spectrum Organisation has the codename "White", the malevolent Mysterons use an agent called "Captain Black". Moore presented this as an example of how "symbolism of white as positive and black as negative is pervasive in our culture." When the series was repeated on BBC2 in the early 1990s, some commentators interpreted this colour opposition as having racist undertones. Gerry Anderson rejected this argument and pointed out that the series features heroic non-white characters in the form of Lieutenant Green, Melody Angel and Harmony Angel. Around this time, various newspapers reported that the Commission for Racial Equality (CRE) had filed a complaint against the BBC over the alleged racism of the names; the story was repetition of a baseless rumour started by a freelance reporter and was rejected by the CRE in its annual report. On black-and-white dualism, Guyanese actor Cy Grant, who voiced Lieutenant Green and praised the series for its multiculturalism, commented that "the 'darkness' of the Mysterons is most easily seen as the psychological rift — the struggle of 'good' and 'evil' — of the Western world as personified by Colonel White and his team. Dark and light are but aspects of each other. Incidentally, green is the colour of nature that can heal that rift."

White has also been interpreted as part of a supposed religious allegory in the series. According to Grant and other commentators, the character could be regarded as a God analogue, with Cloudbase as Heaven and the resurrected Captain Scarlet as the Son of God; the Devil is symbolised by either Captain Black or the Mysterons. Both Robin Turner of Wales Online and Chris Jenkins of Total DVD magazine compare White to God seated in his "heavenly Cloudbase" (defended by a fighter squadron that happens to be codenamed "the Angels"). Anderson denied that any of this symbolism was intentional.
