= Captain Scarlet (character) =

Fiction character created by Gerry and Sylvia Anderson

- Captain Scarlet and the Mysterons character
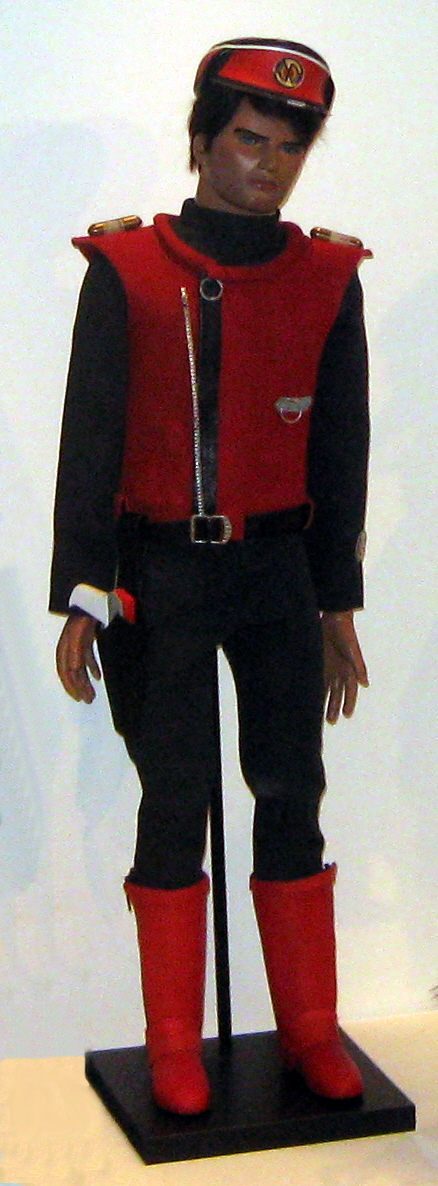
- Scarlet puppet at the National Media Museum
- First appearance: "The Mysterons" (29 September 1967)
- Created by: Gerry Anderson; Sylvia Anderson
- Designed by: Mary Turner (sculptor)
- Voiced by: Francis Matthews

In-universe information
- Full name: Paul Metcalfe
- Species: Mysteron reconstruction; formerly human
- Occupation: Spectrum officer
- Nationality: British

Captain Scarlet is the fictional main character in the Supermarionation science fiction television series Captain Scarlet and the Mysterons and its animated remake New Captain Scarlet.

== Background ==
Commentators consider the original Captain Scarlet's appearance to be based on either Cary Grant, Roger Moore, or the character's voice actor, Francis Matthews. Scarlet's voice is widely acknowledged to be an imitation of Grant's Mid-Atlantic accent. Matthews wrote that he was hired to voice Captain Scarlet because series co-creator Gerry Anderson "had heard my Cary Grant impression on Pete Murray's [radio show] Open House and simply wanted that sound". Anderson, however, said that the impression was Matthews's own choice, and that while it was not what had been intended for Captain Scarlet, the production was happy for him to use it. Kyle Anderson of the website Nerdist writes that Matthews's take on Grant "really makes the titular hero seem like a man out of time, which works really well."

== Depiction ==
=== Captain Scarlet and the Mysterons ===
Scarlet's real name is Paul Metcalfe. Born on 17 December 2036, he is from Winchester, England and speaks with a Mid-Atlantic accent. He is a competent driver and pilot, as well as a qualified astronaut. Well trusted by the commander-in-chief of Spectrum, Colonel White, he is the organisation's top agent and is usually assigned its most dangerous and critical missions.

Scarlet is killed in the first episode of the series, in a car crash brought about by the Mysterons which also results in the death of fellow officer Captain Brown. The Mysterons create doppelgangers of the two men and program them to assassinate the World President. After Brown's replica is destroyed in an unsuccessful attempt on the President's life, Scarlet's abducts the President from Cloudbase and flies him to England, taking him to the top of the London Car-Vu, a large car park tower. Cornered while holding the President at gunpoint over the city below, Scarlet is shot by Captain Blue and falls hundreds of feet to his apparent death. In the final scene, it is revealed that Scarlet has returned to life thanks to the Mysterons' power of "retrometabolism", although the fall has broken the Mysterons' hold over him and restored his original personality. This ability heals Scarlet of any physical injuries – and even resurrects him from death – within hours, making him virtually indestructible.

Scarlet's Mysteron body, like those of all Mysteron reconstructions, is still vulnerable to high-voltage electricity and impervious to X-rays. He also has a "sixth sense" when close to a Mysteron presence – he becomes nauseated, sweats, and experiences severe headache. However, this sense does not always indicate all Mysteron presences in the area. Though Scarlet "dies" several times in the course of the series, he always returns to life. In "Attack on Cloudbase", Captain Scarlet is declared permanently dead during a battle for Cloudbase; however, this is later revealed to be a nightmare dreamt by Symphony Angel.

Scarlet is close friends with his main field partner, Captain Blue. In the episode "Renegade Rocket", both men are prepared to stay in a missile base targeted by the Mysterons and die in a last-ditch attempt to stop its destruction. Scarlet is also friends with Lieutenant Green, as demonstrated when Green accompanies Scarlet and Blue on certain missions.

=== New Captain Scarlet ===
Captain Scarlet
- New Captain Scarlet character
- First appearance: "Instrument of Destruction, Part 1" (12 February 2005)
- Voiced by: Wayne Forester

In-universe information
- Full name: Paul Metcalfe
- Occupation: Spectrum officer
- Family: Tom Metcalfe & Ann Brightman (parents)
- Significant other: Destiny Angel
- Nationality: British and American

Originally from Winchester, Paul Metcalfe was born to Ann Brightman, a British astrophysicist, and Tom Metcalfe, an American pilot who later joined the International Space Agency. As a boy of ten, Paul watched his father take humankind's first steps on Mars and vowed to follow in his footsteps. Paul studied astrophysics at MIT before joining the US Air Force. However, the outbreak of global terrorist wars, which saw the deaths of both his parents, changed his focus. He transferred to US Special Forces and commanded an elite unit that saw action around the world. His second-in-command was Lieutenant Conrad Lefkon, who became his closest friend. With the end of the wars, a new security organisation was established: Spectrum. Paul was an obvious choice for the new organisation, and took the codename "Captain Scarlet". Lefkon was signed up as "Captain Black".

Scarlet becomes Spectrum's invincible weapon in its "war of nerves" with the Mysterons; a weapon created by the Mysterons themselves after they kill Scarlet while he is exploring the surface of Mars with Captain Black. Upon their discovery of the Mysterons' city, Black uses their lander's weapons to destroy it, believing the Mysterons to be hostile. However, the Mysterons then use their powers to rebuild the city and kill the two humans. They resurrect Scarlet to infiltrate Earth and lead their war against the planet. While under Mysteron control, Scarlet tries to destroy Skybase, but is stopped by Captain Blue and apparently dies when he falls through a plasma stream. He later returns to life, revived by the genetic mutation caused by the Mysterons' "retrometabolisation" process, and reveals himself to be free of their control. Scarlet's newfound ability to self-heal makes him virtually "indestructible".

Through his power of "retrometabolism", Scarlet can recover from all injuries – even fatal ones. However, his recovery is never instantaneous. Further, in several episodes it is stated that he can feel a Mysteron's presence by feeling nauseated and unwell. In the opening story ("Instrument of Destruction"), it is stated that Scarlet shares a telepathic link with Black. During the episode "Rat Trap", the Mysterons are able to contact Scarlet and talk to him, while no one else can hear them. In "Chiller", it is revealed that, when especially badly wounded, Scarlet's body has the capability to separate his emotional and physical selves so that the latter can heal quicker, leaving the former as a ghostlike apparition, detectable only by its coldness.

Though a dedicated Spectrum officer, Scarlet is also tormented by the reality that he is no longer fully human, as well as his growing feelings for Destiny Angel, the girlfriend of his late friend, Black.

== Reception ==
In 1995, Francis Matthews expressed surprise at being so well remembered for voicing a puppet character to the exclusion of his other roles, writing: "I think I have spoken many times about how unimportant Captain Scarlet was in my working life 28 years ago, and I can't give the impression that Scarlet has been a big thing in my life since ... [T]o be left with a piece of wood as one's main epitaph is becoming a bit galling!"

Writing for TV Zone in 2002, Thomasina Gibson praised the character: "... [H]ere was a hero, far superior to any that came before. Troy Tempest in his Stingray was far too wet! The Tracy troop in their Thunderbirds – mere boys! No! The only colour that shone for me from the rainbow of agents pitched against Captain Black and the meddling Mysterons was the bright and vibrant Scarlet." Discussing the character's depiction, Stephen La Rivière notes that "one element that was never dwelt upon, or indeed even mentioned again after the first episode, is that the protagonist we follow for the entire series is, in fact, nothing more than a duplicate, a doppelganger; the hero initially introduced to us is killed within two minutes of our first encounter with him." Comparisons have been made with the Whoniverse character Captain Jack Harkness, who has a rapid self-healing power that makes him virtually immortal. Nerdist's Anderson describes Scarlet as a "proto-Captain Jack. He dies, but can always rejuvenate [sic]."

=== Criticism ===
Jim Sangster and Paul Condon, authors of Collins Telly Guide (2005), argue that the character's "indestructibility" reduces his credibility as a hero: "He'll survive no matter what they throw at him, which should mean that there's zero tension in anything he takes on." Daniel O'Brien offers a similar assessment, identifying this ability as a "possible miscalculation" on the part of the series creators. In support of his argument, he points to a scene in the episode "Attack on Cloudbase" in which Lieutenant Green scoffs, "Anyone can be brave if they're indestructible." Commenting on the 2000s remake, Andrew Billen noted that the new version of the character was referred to as being "virtually indestructible", arguing that the use of a qualifier made the premise more exciting and "fixed every child's main objection" to the original series.

John Peel believes Captain Scarlet's self-healing power to be a major weakness of the original series. He also suggests that the character served as a poor role model to the "impressionable children" who made up most of the audience: "Parents didn't like their children watching a show that appeared to be encouraging them to hero-worship someone who was indestructible." He cites Batman as another 1960s TV series whose young viewers "sometimes tried to copy their heroes, often with nasty or lethal results." Peel believes that the incitement to act dangerously is sustained by the series's lyrical closing theme music, which includes the lines "They crash him, and his body may burn" and "They smash him, but they know he'll return ... to live again." These lyrics led production company Century 21 to make an alternative set of opening titles featuring a disclaimer, in the form of a voice-over by Donald Gray in character as Colonel White, warning: "Captain Scarlet is indestructible. You are NOT. Remember this. Do not try to imitate him!"

=== Religious allegory ===
Captain Scarlet has also been interpreted as part of a supposed religious allegory in the series. Various sources have commented on the idea that the character's self-healing ability makes him an analogue of the resurrected Jesus. Actor Cy Grant, who voiced the original Lieutenant Green, made several observations on the series's alleged religious symbolism. He believed that Colonel White and Captain Scarlet symbolised God and the Son of God, while Captain Scarlet's nemesis, Captain Black, represented the Devil. La Rivière and others note that like the ascended Christ, Captain Scarlet lives in the sky with Angels – on Spectrum's airborne headquarters Cloudbase, which is defended by a fighter squadron codenamed "the Angels". Gerry Anderson denied that any of this symbolism was intentional.

== The Indestructible Man ==
In the Past Doctor Adventures – a series of novels based on Doctor Who, featuring the first seven incarnations of the Doctor in original adventures – the novel The Indestructible Man by Simon Messingham draws heavily on the Anderson shows in general and Captain Scarlet in particular, with an organisation known as "PRISM" acting against the mysterious Myloki with the aid of Captain Grant Matthews (named after Cary Grant and Francis Matthews), transformed into an indestructible state when he was killed and duplicated by the Myloki to such a degree that his original personality asserted itself. In keeping with the adult nature of this interpretation, Grant Matthews is presented as being tormented by his immortality, various sources noting that he is technically only a copy of Grant Matthews rather than being the original man in a new body, ideas that may have been suggested but never analysed regarding Scarlet's nature.

== In music ==
Scarlet is referred to by The Kinks in the song "Daylight" on their album Preservation Act 1.
