= Mysteron =

Fictional alien race in Captain Scarlet

- Captain Scarlet race
- The Mysteron city on Mars as seen in the original Captain Scarlet
- First appearance: "The Mysterons" (29 September 1967)
- Created by: Gerry and Sylvia Anderson

In-universe information
- Base of operations: Computer complex on Mars
- Type: Sentient computers forming a group mind
- Distinctions: Partial control over matter; ability to re-create destroyed beings or objects

The Mysterons are a fictional race of extraterrestrials and the antagonists in the 1960s British Supermarionation television series Captain Scarlet and the Mysterons (1967–68) and its 2005 animated remake, New Captain Scarlet.

The Mysterons in the series are the remnants of the original Mysteron race: alien beings that originated in a galaxy other than the Milky Way and maintained a colony on Mars. They are symbolised by ubiquitous, projected green rings of light and the deep bass voice of their first human convert, Captain Black.

They were voiced by Donald Gray in the original series and Mike Hayley in the remake. In the 2000 animated test film Captain Scarlet and the Return of the Mysterons, they were voiced by Gary Martin.

== Depiction ==
=== Captain Scarlet ===
As shown in the first episode, hostilities between Earth and the Mysterons commence following a Zero-X expedition to Mars, led by Captain Black of the Earth security organisation Spectrum. The purpose of the mission had been to locate the source of radio signals that Spectrum had detected emanating from the planet. The Zero-X astronauts discover an alien city on the Martian surface. After mistaking a deployed surveillance device for a weapon, Black fears an attack and orders a missile attack on the complex, destroying it. However, the city is almost immediately rebuilt before their eyes as a blue beam of light passes over its ruins.

Speaking in a deep, echoing voice, the aliens identify themselves as the Mysterons and state that they have discovered "the secret of reversing matter" (a power later referred to as "retrometabolism"). They have the ability to heal any physical injury and re-create the exact likeness of any object or person – a power they can exercise only after the original person or object has been destroyed. Dedicating themselves to a "slow but nonetheless effective" retaliation for the unprovoked attack on their complex, the Mysterons take control of Black's mind and return him to Earth to act as their primary agent, destroying people and objects so that they may be re-created under Mysteron control.

The Mysteron "rings", twin circles of green light that pass over the Mysterons' victims (here, two men killed in a road accident) as the aliens create replicas to do their bidding. In the original script of the first episode, the Andersons likened the rings to eyes.

Attempting to assassinate the World President, the Mysterons kill and re-create Spectrum's foremost agent, Captain Scarlet, as an indestructible doppelganger. The plot fails, however, when Scarlet's reconstruction falls to its apparent death from the top of a tower, later returning to life with his indestructible qualities intact but his original human consciousness restored.

The Mysterons broadcast their threats by radio, often disguising their intentions using word play – such as stating that they will "kill time" when they intend to kill a Spanish official whose surname is Tiempo in the episode "Operation Time". The original script for the first episode described the voice of the Mysterons as "commanding" and "hypnotic", also specifying that it would be created "by the [voice] artist inhaling helium and the subsequent recording being played back at a lower speed, together with a repetitive echo treatment".

The Mysterons are represented by twin rings of green light that they cast onto scenes of death and destruction from which their facsimiles emerge. The pilot script described these rings as "two fiery green circles" suggestive of eyes. Gerry Anderson said that he came up with this device after seeing a TV advertisement for wool that featured the Woolmark logo being projected over the body of a woman. During filming, the ring effect was produced by panning a transparency across the set using a slide projector.

Mysteron reconstructions of humans are impenetrable to X-rays, making radiographs of their forms indistinguishable from photographs. This enables Spectrum to develop a device (the "Mysteron Detector") capable of identifying them. Additionally, reconstructions are particularly vulnerable to electrical current.

The re-creation process requires the subject to be clinically dead before the copy is created. In "Treble Cross", air force pilot Major Gravener is killed and duplicated but later resuscitated in hospital, allowing Spectrum to set a trap for the Mysterons by sending out the original Gravener in place of his double.

Despite their general ruthlessness, some episodes show that the Mysterons are unwilling to cause suffering. In "Manhunt", Captain Black releases one of the Spectrum Angels from a radioactive booth before she suffers fatal injury – albeit after trapping her there, and then only as a ruse to evade Spectrum.

=== Comic strips ===
Two Mysterons, as drawn by Don Harley for TV Tornado comic

The Captain Scarlet comic strip in TV Century 21 depicted the Mysterons as both energy beings and a computer collective.

On 16 September 1967, a new comic strip called "The Mysterons" appeared simultaneously in the comic books Solo and its sister publication TV Tornado. The initial story provides an adaptation of the destruction of the Mysteron city on Mars by Captain Black, as shown in the first episode of Captain Scarlet. Following the re-creation of the city, the strip shows the previously peaceful Mysterons deciding that they must protect themselves from further aggression by conquering the universe. To that end, some of the Mysterons depart in a flying saucer, headed for the Andromeda Galaxy.

Solo merged with the TV Tornado comic the following week, with the Mysteron strip running in the latter publication from issues 36 to 58. In the second instalment, when a Mysteron party lands on the planet Andorme, the atmosphere restores the hitherto disembodied creatures to visibility in the "ancient Mysteron shape". In this form they are depicted as spherical, polyhedral beings, with three of the faces having "eye slits", one of which can emit a destructive energy beam.

=== New Captain Scarlet ===
In the remake, New Captain Scarlet, the Mysterons live in a city on Mars that is normally hidden from view. The city appears on the surface of Mars for the first time in 2068, during an ill-fated landing by Captains Scarlet and Black ("Instrument of Destruction, Part 1"). They are categorically stated to be energy beings, with one shown to be capable of transforming into the "green rings", and are to some extent individualised – there is a dissenting faction in the "Mysteron consciousness" (as a member of the faction puts it) that believes that, given time, humans will outgrow their destructive impulses and become more like the Mysterons. Unfortunately for the series' protagonists, this group has virtually no influence, and their only agent dispatched to Earth is quickly apprehended by Black.

The Mysterons appear as a pair of green rings; however, it is not known whether this is the result of technology. They claim to be peaceful beings, but wage a "war of nerves" against the people of Earth following Black's devastating assault on the Mysteron city.

The Mysterons possess the ability to reconstruct exact replicas of objects or persons. It is due to this remarkable ability that they are able to re-create their city following Black's attack. They also employ this power from time to time during the "Mysteronisation" process, which imbues their reconstructions (dubbed "replicants" by Spectrum) with the power of "retrometabolisation" – the replicant is able to heal completely from almost any injury, including fatal ones. Replicants may occasionally break from Mysteron control when confronted by human loved ones or are reminded of their past. Often this is only temporary, and the Mysterons forcibly and painfully reassert control over the replicant. The only known survivor of the process is Scarlet, who retains his retrometabolism and remains virtually indestructible, an ability which is a great asset in his work.

Mysterons are also able to control the minds of their human victims, whether the subject has been replicated or not. Mysterons make use of hypnosis for short-term control, as demonstrated by the replicant of Commander Lewis on Doctor Gold ("The Homecoming"). To create a full agent, they use the reconstruction process which leaves them in total control of the victim's body.

The Mysteronisation process alters human biology at the subatomic level, changing its DNA. This genetic alteration makes replicants vulnerable to detection, and as such all Spectrum personnel are subject to regular DNA checks.

== Critical response ==
Commentators have offered a range of explanations as to the exact nature of the Mysterons. According to Nicholas J. Cull, they are a species of "invisible" alien, while Alasdair Wilkins and Sophie Bushwick of the website io9 describe them as "an unfathomable race of probably non-corporeal entities". The tie-in publication The Complete Book of Captain Scarlet by Chris Bentley refutes the notion that the Mysterons of the original series are a type of energy being, instead referring to them as "sentient computers" forming a group mind. The computer complex on Mars is the legacy of the original, corporeal Mysteron race – described as being of extragalactic origin and "masters in the art of computer technology" – who colonised the planet in the 2nd millennium BC and abandoned it at the start of the 20th century AD.

Eamonn McCusker of The Digital Fix describes the Mysterons – along with their primary agent, Captain Black – as "the perfect villains", arguing that their menacing voices and green "eyes" helped to make Captain Scarlet "more memorable than any of Anderson's other shows". Sarah Kurchak of The A.V. Club believes that the Mysterons marked a departure from the villains of earlier Anderson productions due to their apparent omnipresence and omnipotence. She describes them as "truly, realistically terrifying [...] an unknowable foreign entity capable of the deepest undercover work that could strike at any time," adding that Spectrum's occasional defeats at their hands made them "all the more alarming". Wilkins and Bushwick categorise the Mysterons as an example of the "monstrous and evil" type of Martian commonly seen in film, TV and literature, and rank them second only to the invaders of the H. G. Wells novel The War of the Worlds (1897) for malevolence.

Simon J. Gerard of Starburst magazine regards the secondary title sequence – in which the Mysterons, represented only by their "strange green light beams", announce their latest threat to Spectrum – as the "defining moment" of the original Captain Scarlet. The authors of The Rough Guide to Cult TV argue that for younger children, the aliens' slow, deep voice "seemed to embody evil." Several commentators argue that the fact that the Mysterons remain unseen, preferring instead to operate through their replicated intermediaries, makes them all the more frightening. Digital Spy's Morgan Jeffery calls the Mysterons' invisibility "a masterstroke, and another reason why Captain Scarlet holds up well to the scrutiny of an adult eye. The Hood from Thunderbirds, Stingray's Aquaphibians – these are characters unlikely to disturb the dreams of any but the very young. The Mysterons, though? The images conjured up in the minds of older children with over-active imaginations would have been far more terrifying than anything Anderson and his team could have hoped to construct."

Kyle Anderson of Nerdist considers the Mysterons' schemes "pretty ingenious". Other commentators have criticised their methods. Tom Spilsbury questions the wisdom of making the duplicate of Captain Scarlet indestructible given that his death and resurrection in the first episode cause him to break free of Mysteron control. Jeffery queries why the aliens need to create duplicates at all, given that they are apparently able to manipulate Black through mind control. In addition, both Spilsbury and others consider it tactically unsound for the Mysterons, when broadcasting threats to Earth, to inform Spectrum of their exact targets. Writing for Starburst, Andrew Pixley and Julie Rogers suggest that the aliens' transmitted threats make them sound "like some evil alien Ted Rogers". Andrew Blair of Den of Geek writes that "there's something both rubbish and endearing about the Mysterons' attempts to harass humanity into submission with their decidedly piecemeal approach."

=== Symbolism ===
Actor Cy Grant, who voiced the original Lieutenant Green and praised Captain Scarlet for its positive multiculturalism, believed that the series employed a form of black-and-white dualism of which the Mysterons were an aspect: "The 'darkness' of the Mysterons is most easily seen as the psychological rift — the struggle of 'good' and 'evil' — of the Western world as personified by Colonel White and his team. Dark and light are but aspects of each other. Incidentally, green is the colour of nature that can heal that rift."

The Mysterons have also been interpreted as part of a supposed religious allegory in the series. Grant and other commentators have compared Cloudbase (Spectrum's airborne headquarters) to Heaven, Colonel White (the head of Spectrum) to God, and the resurrected Captain Scarlet (White's top agent) to the Son of God; Captain Black, a Spectrum officer-turned-Mysteron agent, is viewed as either an analogue of the Devil or a Judas figure in league with the "satanic" Mysterons of the planet Mars (which Grant likened to Hades). Anderson denied that any of this symbolism was intentional.

=== Cold War analysis ===
Bill Osgerby argues that the Mysterons' tactic of replacing humans with alien doppelgangers promotes "themes of anxiety and mistrust" and an "atmosphere of unease and ambiguity", which he believes reflect the "crisis and collapse of social and political certainties" during the 1960s. Cull, who interprets the original Captain Scarlet as a media product of the Cold War, regards the Mysterons' campaign against Earth as a kind of "Cold War scenario". In an allusion to other science fiction of the time, he states that the Mysterons' reconstructive ability "creates an ever-present danger of an enemy within, which is the stuff of archetypal Cold War paranoia narratives on the model of Invasion of the Body Snatchers (1956)." He adds that Captain Scarlet reflects progressive attitudes to real-world events in that it is humans who start the conflict by attacking the Mysteron city; this "opens the issue of blame and invites reflection on the guilt of one's own side." Discussing humanity's first contact with the Mysterons in the original series' first episode, Geoff Willmetts of Sfcrowsnest notes the Mysterons' technological advantages and humanity's status as a relatively "immature sentient species", stating that this leads to a lack of trust that provokes conflict. He comments: "This is a dilemma of any first contact scenario. One side is always likely to be superior to the other and that will always build some elements of mistrust as to what motivates them and their actions." For Jeffery, that the Mysterons are not "out-and-out villains" is one of the elements that makes Captain Scarlet more "mature" than Thunderbirds.

=== Comparison to terrorism ===
The Mysterons' tactics have been characterised as a form of terrorism by Gerry Anderson and others, including commentator Andrew Billen. Jim Sangster and Paul Condon consider it "oddly prophetic" that Captain Scarlet's original UK run ended not long before the hi-jacking of El Al Flight 426, an event that "made political terrorism big news." They regard the series' theme of terrorism as "incredibly perceptive" on Anderson's part, calling it "staggering ... that at the same time as airplane hi-jacks became a distressingly regular occurrence in the Middle East, and IRA bombings in London, Gerry Anderson was explaining the effects of terrorism to kids, even down to having an aggressor who, it could be argued, has a genuine cause for complaint."

The aftermath of the September 11 attacks and subsequent war on terror have also prompted comparisons. In 2003, Tom Weaver of Starlog magazine noted that the Mysterons employ "what in these troubled times would be called sleeper agents and homicide bombers", "hi-jack" airliners and attempt to wage biological and nuclear warfare. He concluded that "the similarities between the Mysterons' terrorist tactics and our current real-life conflict are so striking, they become impossible to ignore." Commenting on the updated Mysterons of the 2005 remake, David Garland suggested that the aliens' persistent focus on terrorising Earth remotely, as opposed to invading it, "holds particular contemporary resonance". Anderson rejected comparisons to 21st-century terrorism, stating that the Mysterons' methods are not terrorism "as we know it" but "of an invisible force from another world". On parallels between the series and modern events, he argued that "any film that has any kind of war or conflict is always timely, because we as human beings are forever killing each other".
