= Lieutenant Green =

Fictional character from Captain Scarlet

- Captain Scarlet character
- Green as seen in the original TV series
- First appearance: "The Mysterons" (29 September 1967)
- Created by: Gerry and Sylvia Anderson
- Designed by: Tim Cooksey (sculptor, Captain Scarlet and the Mysterons)
- Voiced by: Cy Grant (Captain Scarlet); Jules de Jongh (New Captain Scarlet)

In-universe information
- Full name: Seymour Griffiths (Captain Scarlet); Serena Lewis (New Captain Scarlet)
- Gender: Male (Captain Scarlet); Female (New Captain Scarlet)
- Occupation: Spectrum officer; Computer programmer; Electronics expert
- Nationality: Trinbagonian (Captain Scarlet); American (New Captain Scarlet)

Lieutenant Green is a fictional character in the 1960s British Supermarionation television series Captain Scarlet and the Mysterons and its 2000s animated remake, New Captain Scarlet.

In both series, Green serves as the personal assistant to Spectrum commander-in-chief Colonel White, and is shown to be an expert in computer programming and electronics. In the former, which depicts him as a native of Trinidad and Tobago, he is the only non-white male officer on Cloudbase and the only lieutenant among its personnel. In the latter, the character is re-imagined as a woman.

The original Green is the only black male character to have a substantial role in a Supermarionation series.

== Appearances ==
=== Captain Scarlet ===
In the original series, Green (born Seymour Griffiths) spends most of his time in the Cloudbase control room. He assists Colonel White in the execution of Spectrum assignments by accessing data and radio links from a large supercomputer, which he operates from a moveable chair. At White's command, Green can activate the control room's display screen or speak on the base's public address system. Green rarely leaves Cloudbase, although he occasionally mentions how he would relish an opportunity to meet the Mysteron agent Captain Black "face to face". Other Cloudbase personnel assist White whenever Green is absent.

The character's voice was provided by Guyanese actor and singer Cy Grant, on whom the puppet's appearance was based. He was known to series creators Gerry and Sylvia Anderson for his regular calypso contributions to the current affairs programme Tonight.

=== New Captain Scarlet ===
In the remake series, Green (born Serena Lewis) is re-imagined as a 27-year-old African-American woman, originally from Texas. She remains confined to Skybase (the new series' Cloudbase), but her desk is smaller and her computer uses holographic technology. She is knowledgeable about all aspects of Spectrum and used to work for the United Nations. She is attracted to Captain Blue. At the end of the episode "Proteus", she is offered a promotion to the rank of captain but elects to remain a lieutenant. Gerry Anderson described the re-imagined character as an "incredibly efficient assistant" to Colonel White.

The character's appearance was loosely modelled on "Jinx" Johnson (played by Halle Berry) in the James Bond film Die Another Day (2002). She was voiced by Jules de Jongh.

== Reception ==
When it was repeated on British television in 1993, Captain Scarlet and the Mysterons drew criticism for its use of the codenames "White" (for the benevolent Colonel White) and "Black" (for the villainous Captain Black), with some commentators viewing these opposing colour designations as racially charged and politically incorrect. Gerry Anderson responded to these allegations by pointing out that the series features heroic non-white characters in the form of Green, Melody Angel and Harmony Angel. Green's original voice actor, Cy Grant, believed that Captain Scarlet had positive multicultural value and regarded it as spiritually allegorical. On black-and-white dualism, he argued that "the 'darkness' of the Mysterons is most easily seen as the psychological rift — the struggle of 'good' and 'evil' — of the Western world as personified by Colonel White and his team. Dark and light are but aspects of each other. Incidentally, green is the colour of nature that can heal that rift." He also discussed the idea of Lieutenant Green being an African trickster hero.

The progressiveness of Green's character has drawn a range of responses. Kurt Barling, who wrote an obituary on Grant for The Independent, described Green as "one of the first positive black fictional characters in children's television". He praised the way that Grant delivered the character's lines, stating that his "mellifluous tones" gave Green a "serene and heroic quality". Mike Fillis of Cult Times magazine praised the Andersons' decision to make a black character Cloudbase's "second-in-command", while The Daily Telegraph referred to the character as a "black defender of planet Earth". A contrary view is expressed by Mark Bould, who comments that Green, Cloudbase's "only officer of colour", performs the role of "aide-de-camp/Uhura-style switchboard operator". Paul Myers of The Guardian argues that of all the characters, Green alone "could be a legitimate target for PC wrath", noting that he is of lower rank ("Why was he only a lieutenant?") and that while his fellow officers fight the Mysterons, he remains "grounded" within Spectrum's headquarters. The authors of The Rough Guide To Cult TV argue that the casting of Green as a main character in the original Captain Scarlet was a result of shifting "TV politics" during the 1960s, pointing out that Gerry Anderson had been frustrated in his attempts to include prominent non-white characters in his earlier series.

In a 2008 article on the portrayal of women professionals in television, Yvonne Cook of the Open University noted that one episode of New Captain Scarlet shows the female Green fending off the persistent advances of a male guest character. Cook cited this episode as an example of how "even programmes aimed at young children can contain quite subtle gender stereotyping".
