= Traitor (Captain Scarlet and the Mysterons) =

- Captain Scarlet and the Mysterons episode
- Episode no.: Episode 17
- Directed by: Alan Perry
- Written by: Tony Barwick
- Cinematography by: Ted Catford
- Editing by: Bob Dearberg
- Production code: SCA 21
- Original air date: 14 January 1968

Guest character voices
- Gary Files as Cadet Phil Machin; David Healy as Major Stone; Charles Tingwell as Helicopter A42 Pilot (flashback); Jeremy Wilkin as Cadet Joe Johnson

Episode chronology
← Previous "The Heart of New York"	Next → "Model Spy"

"Traitor" is the 17th episode of Captain Scarlet and the Mysterons, a British Supermarionation television series created by Gerry and Sylvia Anderson and filmed by their production company Century 21 Productions. Written by series script editor Tony Barwick and directed by Alan Perry, it was first broadcast on 14 January 1968 on ATV London.

Set in 2068, the series depicts a "war of nerves" between Earth and the Mysterons: a race of Martians with the power to create functioning copies of destroyed people or objects and use them to carry out acts of aggression against humanity. Earth is defended by a military organisation called Spectrum, whose top agent, Captain Scarlet, was killed by the Mysterons and replaced by a reconstruction that subsequently broke free of their control. Scarlet's double has a self-healing power that enables him to recover from injuries that would be fatal to anyone else, making him Spectrum's best asset in its fight against the Mysterons.

The plot of "Traitor" concerns a series of hovercraft crashes involving Spectrum cadets, which the organisation believes to be the work of a saboteur working for the Mysterons.

== Plot ==
The Mysterons declare that there is a traitor in Spectrum. Following a number of unexplained Spectrum hovercraft crashes in the Australian Outback, Colonel White dispatches Captains Scarlet and Blue to the Koala Base training facility, where he suspects that a double agent is sabotaging the fleet.

Scarlet and Blue arrive at the base ostensibly to give a series of lectures to the cadet hovercraft pilots. Base commander Major Stone and cadet leader Joe Johnson suspect Johnson's patrol partner, Phil Machin, of being the traitor; Machin, however, publicly calls Scarlet's loyalty into question after Blue recounts how Scarlet was still under Mysteron control when he abducted the World President. A fire in Scarlet and Blue's quarters, apparently started deliberately, seems to leave Machin's guilt in little doubt.

The next day, as Scarlet and Blue accompany Johnson and Machin on another hovercraft patrol, the vehicle inexplicably loses control. Machin openly accuses Scarlet of being the traitor and holds him at gunpoint, but is disarmed when the hovercraft lurches and causes him to drop his weapon. All four men – including Scarlet, who successfully removes the hovercraft's control panel – jump to safety before the vehicle crashes into a rock formation and explodes.

Analysis of the panel reveals the cause of the hovercraft accidents – Spectrum's "traitor" – to be nothing more than a defective valve in the vehicle hydraulics. Spectrum metallurgists are baffled by the valve, whose molecular structure appears to have been altered by the Mysterons. The cause of the fire remains unknown.

== Regular voice cast ==
- Ed Bishop as Captain Blue
- Cy Grant as Lieutenant Green
- Donald Gray as Colonel White, Captain Black (archive audio) and the Mysterons
- Francis Matthews as Captain Scarlet
- Liz Morgan as Destiny Angel

== Production ==
"Traitor" was filmed on Century 21 Studios' Stage 3 immediately after "Dangerous Rendezvous", which was also written by Barwick. By the time Barwick wrote these two episodes, filming on Captain Scarlet was several weeks behind schedule. To remedy this, Barwick wrote a flashback to the first episode into each script to reduce the amount of new footage that would need to be shot; this would allow "Dangerous Rendezvous" and "Traitor" to be filmed in a combined 15 days instead of 20. Due to this recycling of old material, Barwick's script for "Traitor" specified that no footage from the first episode was to appear in the clip show series finale, "The Inquisition" (which instead uses scenes from "Big Ben Strikes Again", "Crater 101" and "The Trap" for its flashbacks).

Although the script for "Traitor" allotted about six minutes of the running time for old material, the flashback in the finished episode – in which Captain Blue recalls his gunfight with Captain Scarlet while the latter was still under Mysteron control – runs about five minutes. From a narrative standpoint, this sequence adds credibility to Machin's suspicions about Scarlet while reminding viewers of the origins of Scarlet's indestructibility.

A number of plot changes were made during the transition from script to screen. The original script makes clear that there is no traitor (and the Mysterons' only involvement has been to cause unrest within Spectrum), that the valve failed due to the extremely high temperatures in the Outback, and that the fire in Scarlet and Blue's quarters was an accident. A shot of Machin lurking outside the room before the fire breaks out was filmed but ultimately cut, leaving only a brief glimpse of a departing figure. Cut dialogue indicates that Johnson is Major Stone's nephew, which explains why Stone does not suspect him of being the traitor.

Model-maker Mike Trim based the Spectrum Hovercraft, which does not appear in any other episodes, on his design for the Spectrum Passenger Jet by incorporating a similar forward-swept tail fin. The shooting model ran on rubber tyres hidden by its rim. It was also equipped with a Jetex motor that created a dust trail to make its movements look more realistic. Some of the design elements of the Koala Base model had previously appeared in "Avalanche" and "Special Assignment".

== Broadcast and reception ==
"Traitor" was first broadcast on 14 January 1968 on ATV London. In the ATV Midlands area, it was originally due to air on 12 January but was postponed until 23 April, by which time it had also been broadcast on Granada and Anglia Television.

=== Critical response ===
James Stansfield of the website Den of Geek ranks "Traitor" the fifth-best instalment of Captain Scarlet, summing it up as a "nice whodunit episode" and commenting that it "does keep you guessing as to who the titular traitor will be". He adds that while the insertion of a flashback to the pilot is "a little unwelcome", the fact that it is narrated by Blue "gives it a nice touch".

In a negative review, Fred McNamara praises the episode's ambition in casting doubt on Scarlet's loyalties, but criticises the writing and execution, believing "Traitor" to be the weakest Barwick script of the series and calling the finished episode "messy". He writes that the whodunit-style mystery lacks "conviction and resolve" for not focusing more on the distrust between Machin and Scarlet, and for failing to present any of the characters as being particularly suspicious. The episode's other shortcomings include "unhelpful" plot twists, the "overly long" flashback sequence and the last-minute discovery that the hovercraft crashes have been caused by a single faulty valve, which according to McNamara makes for a weak resolution ("So, after numerous hovercraft explode [...] no one thought to salvage the black box before?") He concludes that the episode is spoiled by its "muddled, ambiguous nature", which he regards as a "a sign, perhaps, that Captain Scarlet and the Mysterons' vision was sometimes further away than it could reach."

Commentators Chris Drake and Graeme Bassett praise the design of the hovercraft, describing it as "an impressive addition to the Spectrum fleet" (though its exact function within the organisation is never explained).
