= Inferno (Captain Scarlet and the Mysterons) =

- Captain Scarlet and the Mysterons episode
- Episode no.: Episode 25
- Directed by: Alan Perry
- Written by: Tony Barwick; Shane Rimmer
- Cinematography by: Ted Catford
- Editing by: Bob Dearberg
- Production code: SCA 31
- Original air date: 16 April 1968

Guest character voices
- Gary Files as Euro Tracker Sergeant; David Healy as Major Moran; Martin King as SKR4 Navigator; Shane Rimmer (uncredited) as SKR4 Pilot

Episode chronology
| ← Previous "Treble Cross" | Next → "Flight 104" |

"Inferno" is the 25th episode of Captain Scarlet and the Mysterons, a British Supermarionation television series created by Gerry and Sylvia Anderson and filmed by their production company Century 21 Productions. Written by Tony Barwick and Shane Rimmer and directed by Alan Perry, it was first broadcast on 16 April 1968 on ATV Midlands.

Set in 2068, the series depicts a "war of nerves" between Earth and the Mysterons: a race of Martians with the power to create functioning copies of destroyed people or objects and use them to carry out acts of aggression against humanity. Earth is defended by a military organisation called Spectrum, whose top agent, Captain Scarlet, was killed by the Mysterons and replaced by a reconstruction that subsequently broke free of their control. Scarlet's double has a self-healing power that enables him to recover from injuries that would be fatal to anyone else, making him Spectrum's best asset in its fight against the Mysterons.

In "Inferno", the Mysterons destroy and reconstruct a spacecraft to attack a desalination facility in the Andes Mountains.

== Plot ==
While tracking down space debris, the Euro-Space recovery vehicle SKR4 is destroyed by a meteoroid impact. Informing ground control that the crew are abandoning their mission due to a technical fault, a Mysteron reconstruction of SKR4 reverses course for Earth.

On Cloudbase, Spectrum learns the target of the Mysterons' latest threat: the Najama complex, an automated facility in the Andes that desalinates seawater to irrigate the interior of South America. Colonel White dispatches a team of field agents, led by Captains Scarlet and Blue and accompanied by the Angel squadron, to the Najama Valley to set up surveillance posts around the complex. Shortly after Spectrum's arrival, Captain Black slips into the ancient Aztec temple where Scarlet and Blue are based and conceals a radio transmitter in the mouth of a statue of the Sun God.

Meanwhile, Euro Tracker station is monitoring SKR4's return journey to Earth. When attempts to contact the spacecraft fail, a concerned Major Moran alerts Cloudbase. Transmissions between Euro Tracker and SKR4 are jammed by an external radio signal that is drawing the spacecraft off course to a new landing site in the Najama area. White deduces that SKR4, which is carrying several explosives packs, is being used as a missile to strike the Najama Valley.

As SKR4 enters Earth's atmosphere, Scarlet and Blue discover that the source of the signal – the transmitter hidden by Black – is somewhere within the temple. Realising that they cannot locate and destroy the transmitter in the time remaining, they evacuate the temple in their Spectrum Pursuit Vehicle and order the Angels to launch an aerial assault on the building. Although the statue of the Sun God is destroyed in the bombardment, Spectrum are too late to prevent SKR4 from crashing into the ruins. The impact triggers a landslide that hits the Najama complex's exposed liquid oxygen tanks and destroys the facility in a series of explosions. Scarlet and Blue acknowledge the Mysteron victory.

== Regular voice cast ==
- Ed Bishop as Captain Blue
- Gary Files as Captain Magenta
- Cy Grant as Lieutenant Green
- Donald Gray as Colonel White and the Mysterons
- Francis Matthews as Captain Scarlet
- Liz Morgan as Destiny Angel and Rhapsody Angel

== Production ==
"Inferno" was filmed in late 1967. The SKR4 miniature model was based on the design of the TVR-17 satellite from the episode "White as Snow". The puppet playing the SKR4 navigator does not appear in any other episodes of Captain Scarlet. Most of the episode's incidental music consists of cues recycled from older Supermarionation productions: seven earlier episodes of Captain Scarlet as well as six episodes of Thunderbirds and three of Supercar.

"Inferno" features the third appearance of the Mysterons' vanishing power, previously seen in "The Heart of New York" and "Model Spy".

== Reception ==
"Inferno" is regarded as the best episode of Captain Scarlet by TV Zone magazine, which praises the episode's "dark direction and straightforwardly effective plot". "Little touches" – such as the realism of Black's cautious ascent of the Sun God statue, and Scarlet and Blue being on first-name terms (making them "real people, with real names and lives behind their codenames") – are also positively received. What is most to the episode's credit, argues the magazine, is its downbeat ending, which is aggravated by the fact that "Spectrum's efforts actually make it worse".

James Stansfield of Den of Geek ranks "Inferno" sixth in his "Top 10" list of Captain Scarlet episodes, praising its "horror movie-style elements" and describing the overall episode as "tremendously fun". Comparing Scarlet and Blue's "[creeping] about the temple looking for clues" to a scene from a Scooby-Doo episode, he also commends the episode's use of point of view shots and echoing footstep sound effects, as well as its portrayal of Scarlet and Blue's camaraderie. He adds that as with other episodes in which the Mysterons prevail, Spectrum's defeat adds to the tension by creating an "'anything can happen'-type" atmosphere.

In a mostly negative review, Fred McNamara criticises the story's "two-dimensional execution", arguing that its descent into a "waiting game" as the SKR4 draws closer to Earth makes the episode an "unfulfilling watch". Noting that "Inferno" was one of the last Captain Scarlet episodes to be made, he suggests that its unexciting plot demonstrates how, "as a story-telling vehicle," the series had "flown as high as it could fly." He adds that Spectrum's powerlessness against the SKR4 makes them tantamount to "hapless bystanders", calling this depiction "oddly compelling". He views the ending as allegorical, writing that the destruction of the ancient temple triggering a landslide represents "humanity's spiritual past crashing down on humanity's technological visions".

Chris Drake and Graeme Bassett suggest that SKR4 being under the control of an agency called Euro-Space shows that the episode's writers were "keen to establish the existence of a European space operation in addition to the obvious American space programme".
