= The Heart of New York (Captain Scarlet and the Mysterons) =

- Captain Scarlet and the Mysterons episode
- Episode no.: Episode 16
- Directed by: Alan Perry
- Written by: Tony Barwick
- Cinematography by: Ted Catford
- Editing by: Bob Dearberg
- Production code: SCA 12
- Original air date: 8 December 1967

Guest character voices
- Gary Files as Doig; David Healy as Kruger; Martin King as Carl and a security guard; Jeremy Wilkin as the fire lookout

Episode chronology
| ← Previous "Lunarville 7" | Next → "Traitor" |

"The Heart of New York" is the 16th episode of Captain Scarlet and the Mysterons, a British Supermarionation television series created by Gerry and Sylvia Anderson and filmed by their production company Century 21 Productions. Written by Tony Barwick and directed by Alan Perry, it was first broadcast on 8 December 1967 on ATV Midlands.

Set in 2068, the series depicts a "war of nerves" between Earth and the Mysterons: a race of Martians with the power to create functioning copies of destroyed people or objects and use them to carry out acts of aggression against humanity. Earth is defended by a military organisation called Spectrum, whose top agent, Captain Scarlet, was killed by the Mysterons and replaced by a reconstruction that subsequently broke free of their control. Scarlet's double has a self-healing power that enables him to recover from injuries that would be fatal to anyone else, making him Spectrum's best asset in its fight against the Mysterons.

In "The Heart of New York", a group of human bank robbers attempt to outwit Spectrum as the Mysterons threaten to destroy the "heart" of New York City. As with the episodes "Winged Assassin" and "Big Ben Strikes Again", similarities between the plot and the September 11 attacks caused "The Heart of New York" to be postponed for several weeks during BBC Two's 2001–2002 repeats of the series.

== Plot ==
Bank robbers Kruger, Doig and Carl break into the Spectrum Security Vaults but are disappointed to find only classified information of no material value. Nevertheless, Kruger is fascinated by documents describing Earth's war with the Mysterons, and devises a plan to exploit it.

Meanwhile, the Mysterons inform Spectrum that they have studied human greed and corruption and that they now intend to destroy the "heart of New York". As the city's population is evacuated and its perimeter roadblocked, Captains Scarlet and Blue search the deserted streets for concealed explosive devices.

Driving through forest, Kruger, Doig and Carl stop at a fire tower and feign drunkenness in front of the lookout. They then destroy their car by sending it over a cliff edge, leading the lookout to believe that they have been killed in a drink-driving accident. Returning to the tower, they tell the lookout that they are Mysteron reconstructions and intend to destroy the Second National Bank of New York. When the lookout's story reaches Cloudbase, Colonel White decides that he will not risk lives to protect the bank and orders all Spectrum personnel to retreat to the roadblocks.

Having acquired another car, Kruger, Doig and Carl drive up to a roadblock manned by Captains Magenta and Ochre. They present false FBI identification and claim to be on official business that has nothing to do with the Second National Bank. Ochre's Mysteron Detector shows them to be human and Magenta permits them to enter the city. The men arrive at the bank aiming to steal the entire East Coast gold reserve. However, they have been followed by Captain Black, who traps them inside a vault and declares that the bank will soon be destroyed.

Learning of the men's arrival, Scarlet is puzzled how a group of supposed government agents knew that the Mysterons were specifically targeting the bank when only Spectrum personnel had been informed. Realising that they are the men who confronted the fire lookout, and that they evidently faked their deaths and are now about to get away with robbery, Scarlet and Blue speed to the bank in their Spectrum Patrol Car but turn around when they see Black driving the men's car in the opposite direction. As the Mysterons use their powers to teleport Black to safety, the bank is destroyed in an explosion, killing the thieves. Back on Cloudbase, White concedes that Kruger, Doig and Carl exemplified the greed and corruption denounced by the Mysterons, but insists that the good of humanity will eventually prevail over the Martian evil.

== Regular voice cast ==
- Ed Bishop as Captain Blue
- Gary Files as Captain Magenta
- Cy Grant as Lieutenant Green
- Donald Gray as Colonel White, Captain Black and the Mysterons
- Francis Matthews as Captain Scarlet
- Jeremy Wilkin as Captain Ochre

== Production ==
The Mysteron's vanishing power is seen for the first time in this episode. It is also featured in "Model Spy", "Expo 2068" and "Inferno". The scale model representing the exterior of the Second National Bank was designed by special effects assistant Mike Trim.

Captain Black is played by a modified version of the Black puppet featured in the opening scenes of the first episode, before the character is taken over by the Mysterons. This is in contrast with all other appearances of the Mysteron agent, which used a copy of the original puppet with "Mysteronised" facial features. Consequently, Black looks subtly different in "The Heart of New York" compared to other episodes of the series.

The marionette that played Kruger was one of the most frequently used "revamp" puppets of Captain Scarlet and later Supermarionation productions: its other appearances in Captain Scarlet alone include "Winged Assassin", "Big Ben Strikes Again", "Point 783", "Avalanche", "The Trap" and "Special Assignment". By contrast, the puppet of Doig was never used again. The Carl puppet previously appeared as Lieutenant Belmont in "White As Snow" while the fire lookout also played Major Brooks in "Point 783" and Air Commodore Goddard in "The Trap". After being re-wigged, the puppet that portrayed the Spectrum Vaults security guard went on to appear in Joe 90 as series regular Shane Weston.

The episode contains a number of continuity errors. In the puppet shots of Scarlet, Blue and Black driving through New York City, trees and bushes are seen in the background, yet in the corresponding model shots no plants are shown. When Kruger, Doig and Carl tell the fire lookout that they are Mysteron reconstructions, Kruger's jacket changes colour between the scale puppet shots and the close-ups featuring the character's human body double.

== Broadcast and reception ==
When BBC Two began repeats of Captain Scarlet in September 2001, "The Heart of New York" was originally due to be broadcast as the 11th episode. However, along with "Winged Assassin" and "Big Ben Strikes Again", it was postponed due to perceived similarities between the plot and the September 11 attacks. Like the other two episodes, it was eventually broadcast several weeks after its intended transmission date.

=== Critical response ===
James Stansfield of Den of Geek considers "The Heart of New York" the second-best episode of Captain Scarlet, regarding it as "memorable and unique" because "the Mysterons [are not] really the villains". He praises the scenes of the deserted New York and describes the overall story as "a great episode with a really different storyline to it".

Writer Fred McNamara also praises the episode, calling it "something of a triumph in its focus on characters and overall comment on the state of humanity's darker side". He perceives a minimalism in its approach, noting that it features little in terms of vehicle action, but commends the "off-kilter feel" created by its emphasis on the three bank robbers. He believes that the episode fundamentally serves as a "character study on the consequences of greed", arguing that its "grey depiction of morality" was unusual for a TV series that was written primarily for children. In a later online article, he considers the episode to be one of Captain Scarlet's best, describing it as "oddly low-key" and a confident "moralistic fable".
