= The Inquisition (Captain Scarlet and the Mysterons) =

- Captain Scarlet and the Mysterons episode
- Episode no.: Episode 32
- Directed by: Ken Turner
- Written by: Tony Barwick
- Cinematography by: Ted Catford
- Editing by: Bob Dearberg
- Production code: SCA 32
- Original air date: 12 May 1968

Guest character voices
- Sylvia Anderson as; Linda Nolan ("Crater 101" scenes): Gary Files as; Maitre d' Captain Holt ("The Trap" scenes): David Healy as; Colgan Frazer ("Crater 101") Air Commodore Goddard ("The Trap"): Martin King as; 2nd Police Officer ("Big Ben Strikes Again" scenes): Paul Maxwell as; 1st Police Officer ("Big Ben Strikes Again"): Neil McCallum (uncredited) as; 4th Police Officer ("Big Ben Strikes Again"): Charles Tingwell as; Macey ("Big Ben Strikes Again"): Jeremy Wilkin as; 3rd Police Officer ("Big Ben Strikes Again") Shroeder ("Crater 101")

Episode chronology
← Previous "Attack on Cloudbase"	Next → —

"The Inquisition" is the 32nd and final episode of Captain Scarlet and the Mysterons, a British Supermarionation television series created by Gerry and Sylvia Anderson and filmed by their production company Century 21 Productions. Written by Tony Barwick and directed by Ken Turner, it was first broadcast on 12 May 1968 on ATV London.

Set in 2068, the series depicts a "war of nerves" between Earth and the Mysterons: a race of Martians with the power to create functioning copies of destroyed people or objects and use them to carry out acts of aggression against humanity. Earth is defended by a military organisation called Spectrum, whose top agent, Captain Scarlet, was killed by the Mysterons and replaced by a reconstruction that subsequently broke free of their control. Scarlet's double has a self-healing power that enables him to recover from injuries that would be fatal to anyone else, making him Spectrum's best asset in its fight against the Mysterons.

In this clip show episode, Captain Blue disappears during a night out after unwittingly drinking drugged coffee. Having fallen unconscious, he awakes in what appears to be the Cloudbase control room in the presence of a Spectrum Intelligence agent, who tells him that he has been missing for months and must prove his identity by giving information about Spectrum's cipher codes. Unwilling to divulge classified material, Blue instead tries to satisfy his interrogator by describing some of Spectrum's operations against the Mysterons, which are recounted in the form of flashbacks.

"The Inquisition" has been negatively received by commentators, who argue that the clip show device makes for an unsatisfying series finale and criticise the story for leaving the war between Earth and Mars unresolved.

== Plot ==
While dining with Captain Scarlet at the Markham Arms pub, Captain Blue is served drugged coffee by the maitre d', who unknown to Scarlet and Blue is a Mysteron reconstruction. After finishing the coffee, Blue passes out and disappears. Transmitting to Earth, the Mysterons warn Spectrum that a member of the organisation will betray them all.

Blue comes round in what appears to be the control room of Spectrum Cloudbase, which is deserted except for a man who introduces himself as a Spectrum Intelligence agent called Colgan. Blue is told that he has been missing for three months and must prove his identity by giving details of Spectrum's secret cipher codes. Unwilling to divulge classified information, Blue tries to satisfy Colgan by describing some of Spectrum's operations against the Mysterons. However, his efforts are futile: his overview of the Mysterons' attempt to destroy London ("Big Ben Strikes Again") is judged useless, while his first-person account of the destruction of their base on the Moon ("Crater 101") is rejected due to the extensive coverage that the event received in the news media. His third example – the attempted assassination of the world's air force leaders ("The Trap") – is also rejected, even though the details were never made public.

Increasingly suspicious of Colgan's interest in the codes, as well as the absence of other Spectrum personnel, Blue attempts to leave the control room but finds his way blocked by a man armed with a gun and a hypodermic syringe, which Colgan says contains a truth serum. Realising that he has been abducted by Mysteron agents, Blue hurls himself through an observation window and lands on a painted-sky canvas, revealing "Cloudbase" to be nothing more than a replica built inside a warehouse. Scarlet arrives in a Spectrum Pursuit Vehicle, orders Blue to get clear and destroys the warehouse with the SPV's rocket launcher. Informing Blue that he went missing just hours before, Scarlet suggests that he tell his story "back on the real Cloudbase".

== Regular voice cast ==
- Ed Bishop as Captain Blue
- Cy Grant as Lieutenant Green ("Crater 101" and "The Trap" scenes)
- Donald Gray as the Mysterons
- Janna Hill as Symphony Angel ("The Trap" scenes)
- Francis Matthews as Captain Scarlet

== Production ==
Captain Scarlet is one of a number of Supermarionation productions to feature a clip show series finale, the first of which was Stingray's "Aquanaut of the Year" (1965). This practice continued for the Andersons' next three puppet series, ending with Joe 90's "The Birthday" (1969).

"The Inquisition" had been planned long before it was scripted. It was deliberately written to exclude scenes from the first episode, to which there had already been flashbacks in "Winged Assassin", "Dangerous Rendezvous" and "Traitor". The framing scenes were shot between 22 and 25 November 1967 on Stage 3 at Century 21 Studios on the Slough Trading Estate; this coincided with filming of "The Most Special Agent", the first episode of Joe 90, on Stage 4. The finished episode contains only eight minutes of original material, with the flashback to "Crater 101" alone making up another eight minutes of the 25-minute runtime. "The Inquisition" is the only episode of Captain Scarlet not to feature Spectrum commander-in-chief Colonel White or the real Cloudbase.

The Markham Arms pub was designed as a Tudor-style house by Mike Trim and built as a cardboard and Perspex scale model by Alan Shubrook. To give the model an aged look, Shubrook used sandpaper to wear down the walls and applied strokes of dark paint around the windows to simulate rain stains. He described creating the pub as a "typical day's work" in the Century 21 model-making team. The background characters in the pub interior scene were played by 20 of Century 21's "revamp" (guest) puppets.

Colgan was played by a newly made copy of revamp puppet 19, which had appeared in various guest roles in Captain Scarlet and was making its debut as regular character Sam Loover in Joe 90 while "The Inquisition" was being filmed. The copy would go on to appear in the later series. Blue's escape from the fake Cloudbase was realised by throwing the puppet through a sheet of glass onto the painted-sky backdrop of the control room set. Although these shots were filmed at high speed, the gloved hand of a crew member can be seen launching the puppet.

The episode's original music included a piano piece, performed by series composer Barry Gray, which is heard during the opening scene set inside the Markham Arms.

== Broadcast and reception ==
First broadcast on 12 May 1968 on ATV London, "The Inquisition" was omitted from the series' first UK-wide re-run that began in 1993 on BBC2. It ultimately debuted on BBC2 on 9 September 1994.

=== Critical response ===
"The Inquisition" has been negatively received by commentators. Chris Drake and Graeme Bassett argue that the episode's reliance on previously filmed material makes it an "unusual" series finale. Anthony Clark of sci-fi-online.com calls it a "cheap flashback episode", while Digital Spy's Morgan Jeffery describes it as a "glorified clip show" that "[provides] no resolution to the series", comparing it negatively to the "thrilling" previous instalment, "Attack on Cloudbase". Andrew Thomas of Dreamwatch magazine argues that the series' "occasional lack of ideas" led to an "over-use" of recycled footage, and believes "The Inquisition" to be the worst example of this. He also describes Colgan's interrogation of Blue as "rather unconvincing". Martin Cater of Network Distributing calls the episode "decidedly downbeat" but considers the episodes remembered in flashback to be "arguably the three best examples from the series after the pilot".

Although he describes the overall episode as a "farce", writer Fred McNamara believes that its frame narrative "just about succeeds" and praises the interrogation scenes for their pace and level of drama, arguing that the episode as a whole has a "handsome flow". He also criticises the story for revealing nothing of Colgan's history and questions the Mysterons' tactics, wondering how and why they went to the trouble of re-creating Cloudbase to interrogate Blue and what they intended to do with the cipher codes had their plan succeeded. In assessing the episode as Captain Scarlet's last, McNamara comments that while "The Inquisition" does not serve as a conventional ending to the series storyline (which instead "just stops"), Captain Scarlet was not the only Supermarionation series to finish on an ambiguous note. However, he argues that this lack of resolution is more disappointing in Captain Scarlet's case because it was the only series to have "something resembling an overarching story", writing that given this commitment to an ongoing narrative, "The Inquisition" represents an "undeniable anticlimax".

Chris Bentley comments that the flashback to "Crater 101" changes the established continuity of that episode: while inside the Mysteron base, Scarlet casts his mind back to a conversation that he had with Controller Linda Nolan at Lunarville 6, prompting a part of this exchange to be replayed as a "flashback within a flashback". According to Bentley, this re-edit was made for the sake of "narrative clarity". He also notes that two of Century 21's "revamp" puppets make more than one appearance in the episode: the puppet that played Shroeder from "Crater 101" and another that appeared as a police officer in "Big Ben Strikes Again" have non-speaking roles in both the Markham Arms scene (as the pianist and one of the pub patrons) and the material from "The Trap" (as conference delegates). A similar observation is made by Jim Sangster and Paul Condon, authors of Collins Telly Guide, who compare the look of the Shroeder puppet to that of actor Robert Mitchum. Sangster and Condon regard "The Inquisition" as one of the series' "disappointing amount of flashback compilations".

In his review of the CD release of the Captain Scarlet soundtrack, Andrew Pixley of TV Zone magazine names the "sombre" piano piece from "The Inquisition" as one of two standout tracks.
