= The Trap (Captain Scarlet and the Mysterons) =

- Captain Scarlet and the Mysterons episode
- Goddard fires a mounted machine gun at Captain Scarlet. The explosions in this scene were created using Cordtex and petrol gel.
- Episode no.: Episode 13
- Directed by: Alan Perry
- Written by: Alan Pattillo
- Cinematography by: Ted Catford
- Editing by: Harry MacDonald
- Production code: SCA 17
- Original air date: 10 November 1967

Guest character voices
- Gary Files as Captain Holt; David Healy as Air Commodore Goddard; Jeremy Wilkin as Morton and a distillery attendant

Episode chronology
← Previous "Shadow of Fear"	Next → "Special Assignment"

"The Trap" is the 13th episode of Captain Scarlet and the Mysterons, a British Supermarionation television series created by Gerry and Sylvia Anderson and filmed by their production company Century 21 Productions. Written by Alan Pattillo and directed by Alan Perry, it was first broadcast on 10 November 1967 on ATV Midlands.

Set in 2068, the series depicts a "war of nerves" between Earth and the Mysterons: a race of Martians with the power to create functioning copies of destroyed people or objects and use them to carry out acts of aggression against humanity. Earth is defended by a military organisation called Spectrum, whose top agent, Captain Scarlet, was killed by the Mysterons and replaced by a reconstruction that subsequently broke free of their control. Scarlet's double has a self-healing power that enables him to recover from injuries that would be fatal to anyone else, making him Spectrum's best asset in its fight against the Mysterons.

In "The Trap", the Mysterons plot to assassinate the leaders of Earth's air forces. Pattillo had written and directed many episodes of the Andersons' earlier series; however, his script for "The Trap" was to be his sole contribution to Captain Scarlet. The scale model and special effects sequences posed several technical challenges for Century 21. Footage from "The Trap" was subsequently incorporated into the flashback series finale "The Inquisition".

== Plot ==
Air Commodore Goddard, in conjunction with Spectrum, has organised a conference of the world's air force leaders to discuss anti-Mysteron defence. While flying to Cloudbase through a heavy storm, Goddard and his pilot, Captain Holt, are killed when their XQR plane is hit by lightning and crashes. Mysteron reconstructions of Goddard, Holt and the XQR continue the journey. Due to the poor visibility, Melody Angel, Goddard and Holt's escort, cannot be sure that the XQR was struck. On arrival at Cloudbase, Goddard informs Colonel White that he has changed the conference venue to the remote Glen Garry Castle in Scotland. Transmitting to Earth, the Mysterons cryptically warn that the "wings of the world will be clipped".

While assessing the security of the castle, Captain Scarlet discovers a secret alcove in the conference hall containing a mounted machine gun manned by Holt. Goddard holds Scarlet at gunpoint and explains that when the conference begins, all the delegates will be killed. He then ties Scarlet to a chair while impersonating his voice to give clearance for the conference to begin. After arriving in a Magnacopter with the delegates, Symphony Angel is also captured. Scarlet and Symphony are both imprisoned in the castle dungeon.

Believing that the XQR was destroyed, Melody leaves Cloudbase to find proof and eventually locates the plane's wreckage. Remembering the Mysteron threat, White realises that the air force leaders are in danger. Unable to contact either Scarlet or Symphony, he dispatches Captain Blue to Glen Garry.

Scarlet and Symphony are released by Glen Garry's caretaker, Morton. Moments before the conference begins, Scarlet bursts into the hall and shoots Holt, taking a bullet in the process. Symphony, Morton and the delegates return to the Magnacopter while Goddard leaves to man another machine gun on the castle battlements. Arriving in a Spectrum Pursuit Vehicle, Blue radios Symphony to warn her not to take off, or the Magnacopter will be in Goddard's line of fire. Obtaining a jet pack from the SPV, the injured Scarlet flies up to the battlements and draws Goddard's fire as Symphony clears the area. Goddard ultimately guns down Scarlet, but is killed when Blue destroys the battlements with the SPV's cannon. Scarlet later recovers from his injuries.

== Regular voice cast ==
- Sylvia Anderson as Melody Angel
- Ed Bishop as Captain Blue
- Cy Grant as Lieutenant Green
- Donald Gray as Colonel White and the Mysterons
- Janna Hill as Symphony Angel
- Francis Matthews as Captain Scarlet

== Production ==
Script editor Tony Barwick asked Alan Pattillo to write for Captain Scarlet because Pattillo had been a regular writer on Thunderbirds. However, commitments to other projects meant that Pattillo was able to submit only one script for the new series. The castle setting was influenced by Gerry Anderson, who according to Pattillo "always liked to have a Scottish subject in his series." Pattillo's script called for technically-complex puppet scenes in which all ten marionettes playing conference delegates appear in the same shot. Due to the large number of guest characters the wardrobe department was required to make several new military uniforms.

Two filming models of the XQR were made, to different scales. The puppet-scale cockpit set was adapted from the interior of Thunderbird 4. As the lightning bolt effect could not be created in-studio, it was instead added during post-production via optical printing. The illusion of distant lightning bursts was created by flashing an arc welder, while the flames and smoke issuing from the crippled XQR were produced by Jetex fuel pellets attached to the side of the model that was facing away from the camera. For the crash scene, petrol gel explosives were detonated in the foreground to simulate the plane's destruction; the model was retained so that it could be re-used in later episodes. A shot of the reconstructed XQR making its final approach to Cloudbase was filmed but ultimately cut.

Glen Garry Castle was adapted from a scale model that had previously been used as McGregor Castle in the Stingray episode "Loch Ness Monster" and Glen Carrick Castle in the Thunderbirds episode "30 Minutes After Noon". It was expanded for its appearance in "The Trap". The conference hall seats had appeared in the earlier Stingray and Thunderbirds episodes. The puppet playing Morton was modelled on actor Robert Mitchum.

The Magnacopter, which does not appear in any other episodes, was designed by Mike Trim, assistant to effects director Derek Meddings. The interiors were built by Century 21's art department, who according to Trim were rarely able to replicate the curves of his scale model designs as they made their sets largely out of "flat sheet" materials of limited malleability. Rather than build a brand-new set for the Magnacopter's cockpit, the art department chose to save time and money by adapting an existing set that had previously appeared in Thunderbirds. Trim was forced to alter his design, which originally had a more aerodynamic look, to match the lines of this set.

Director Alan Perry served as Captain Scarlet's body double for a close-up shot of Goddard jabbing a gun into the character's back, as well as for a scene in which the incarcerated Scarlet picks up a spear to hit against the dungeon ceiling, drawing the attention of Morton. Commentators Chris Drake and Graeme Bassett note the mixture of live action and puppetry in the dungeon scenes, which creates forced perspective. Two small mice were added to the puppet set; doubling for rats, they were the only live animals to be used with puppets on Captain Scarlet.

The shootout between Scarlet and Goddard posed a number of challenges for the effects crew. To simulate a line of bullets hitting the castle wall, a strip of Cordtex explosive was fixed to the set and lit at one end, creating a series of miniature explosions as the flame travelled down the strip. The destruction of the battlements was achieved by filling the scale model, which was made of balsa wood and polystyrene, with petrol gel and igniting it. For the shot in which Scarlet is gunned down, the puppet was fitted with its "grimacing" head that was originally created for the series' first episode.

The incidental music was recorded by series composer Barry Gray on 27 August 1967 in a four-hour studio session with a 16-piece orchestra – one of the largest used for any Captain Scarlet episode. The music for "Model Spy" was recorded on the same day. Two instrumentals from "The Trap" – "The Fate of the XQR" and "Castle Glen Garry" – are included on the CD release of the Captain Scarlet soundtrack.

"The Trap" is the first episode of Captain Scarlet in distributor ITC's official broadcast order to feature the lyrical version of the end titles theme performed by The Spectrum. However, the first episode to be produced with this version was "Lunarville 7".

== Reception ==
Chris Bentley, author of Captain Scarlet: The Vault, calls "The Trap" a viewer favourite, praising the episode's "atmospheric setting" and "tense, action-packed climax". Shane M. Dallmann of Video Watchdog magazine describes the episode as an "imaginative change of pace" and "gimmicky".

Writer Fred McNamara regards "The Trap" as "perhaps the strongest example of how watchable an episode of Captain Scarlet can be if you get the tone right, but almost don't bother with the plot", criticising the story and writing but praising the design and puppet work. Judging the episode's title "as uninspired as its content", McNamara sums up the premise as "one deafening yawn", arguing that the script's decision to treat the air force leaders as a "soulless mass of a character" rather than as individuals makes the story "unfulfilling". He also criticises the episode's portrayal of Spectrum as an incompetent organisation that "[plays] right into a harmfully obvious Mysteron plot." Though McNamara commends the design of Glen Garry, he believes that the castle setting feels forced, suggesting that Captain Scarlet was merely trying to follow in the footsteps of castle-bound episodes of Stingray and Thunderbirds. However, he praises the puppet choreography of the gun battle between Scarlet and Goddard, describing the scene as "expertly executed, and quite electrifying with its darting edits" as well as "a testament to how the directors of Captain Scarlet weren't going to be beaten by the immobile nature of these puppets."
