= Michael Trim =

Michael Trim may refer to:

- Mike Trim (born 1945), British artist and miniature model-maker
- Michael Trim (television producer) (born 1954), American television producer, cinematographer and director
