= The Heart of New York =

The Heart of New York may refer to:

- The Heart of New York (film), American 1932 comedy film
- "The Heart of New York" (Captain Scarlet), British 1967 episode of TV show, Captain Scarlet and the Mysterons
