= Model Spy =

- Captain Scarlet and the Mysterons episode
- Episode no.: Episode 18
- Directed by: Ken Turner
- Written by: Bill Hedley
- Cinematography by: Julien Lugrin
- Editing by: John Beaton
- Production code: SCA 18
- Original air date: 29 December 1967

Guest character voices
- Sylvia Anderson as Gabrielle; Liz Morgan as Helga; Jeremy Wilkin as André Verdain and the casino commissionaire

Episode chronology
← Previous "Traitor"	Next → "Fire at Rig 15"

"Model Spy" is the 18th episode of Captain Scarlet and the Mysterons, a British Supermarionation television series created by Gerry and Sylvia Anderson and filmed by their production company Century 21 Productions. Written by Bill Hedley and directed by Ken Turner, it was first broadcast on 29 December 1967 on ATV Midlands.

Set in 2068, the series depicts a "war of nerves" between Earth and the Mysterons: a hostile race of Martians with the power to create functioning copies of destroyed people or objects and use them to carry out acts of aggression against humanity. Earth is defended by a military organisation called Spectrum, whose top agent, Captain Scarlet, was murdered by the Mysterons and replaced by a reconstruction that later broke free of their control. Scarlet's double has a self-healing power that enables him to recover from injuries that would be fatal to anyone else, making him Spectrum's best asset in its fight against the Mysterons.

In "Model Spy", after the Mysterons threaten to assassinate a French intelligence agent, Captains Scarlet and Blue and Destiny and Symphony Angels go undercover to protect the target.

== Plot ==
Transmitting to Earth, the Mysterons warn Spectrum that they intend to assassinate André Verdain, the secret head of the European Area Intelligence Service. Publicly, Verdain is a celebrated fashion designer, who runs the House of Verdain as a front for his spy network. Believing that Verdain's death would be disastrous for the Service, Colonel White predicts that the Mysterons will make an attempt on the spymaster's life at an upcoming fashion show in Monte Carlo, and assigns a team of four – Captains Scarlet and Blue and Destiny and Symphony Angels – to protect him. The agents go undercover as employees of Verdain, with Scarlet and Blue (going by their real names Paul Metcalfe and Adam Svenson) posing as a public relations officer and a photographer, and Destiny and Symphony as fashion models. With the Paris airports closed due to fog, the agents are forced to fly to Monte Carlo direct.

Unknown to Verdain and Spectrum, two of Verdain's models, Helga and Gabrielle, have been killed in a monotrain derailment and replaced with Mysteron reconstructions. When Verdain takes his guests on a tour of Monte Carlo Bay in his luxury yacht, Gabrielle starts a fire in the engine room that quickly consumes the vessel. All on board jump to safety only seconds before the yacht explodes.

Despite Scarlet's warnings, Verdain refuses to cancel his press reception at a nearby hotel. A man resembling Captain Black has been sighted in Europe and Verdain is sure that he will make an appearance at the event. During the pre-reception cocktail party, Gabrielle inadvertently reveals herself to be a Mysteron agent when she tells Scarlet that she flew in from Paris while it was fog-bound. Before Scarlet can challenge her, Black, who is waiting outside the hotel armed with a sniper rifle, shoots Verdain through an open window with a tranquiliser dart. Gabrielle turns off the lights, and in the resulting confusion, Helga and Black bundle the unconscious Verdain into Black's car and speed away, bound for an unknown location.

With the aid of a homing drug that Scarlet put in Verdain's drink, the Spectrum team pursue the Mysteron agents by car, SPV (obtained from a casino) and helicopter. Caught between the Spectrum forces and a police roadblock, Black and Helga push Verdain out of their car and come to a halt. As Verdain regains consciousness, the Mysterons use their powers to teleport the car and its occupants away. Back at the hotel, Verdain thanks his protectors and presents Destiny and Symphony with splendid gowns courtesy of the House of Verdain.

== Regular voice cast ==
- Ed Bishop as Captain Blue
- Cy Grant as Lieutenant Green
- Donald Gray as Colonel White, Captain Black and the Mysterons
- Janna Hill as Symphony Angel
- Francis Matthews as Captain Scarlet
- Liz Morgan as Destiny Angel

== Production ==
André Verdain was named after real-life fashion designers André Courrèges and Pierre Cardin. "Model Spy" was the first episode in the production order to state that Scarlet and Blue's full real names are Paul Metcalfe and Adam Svenson.

The miniature monotrain was designed by special effects assistant Mike Trim. Remembering that the suspended monotrain from the Thunderbirds episode "Brink of Disaster" had been difficult to film, Trim designed the new train to run on a OO gauge model railway track, which proved much easier to shoot. The model shots of Verdain's yacht feature a background painting of Monte Carlo Bay, which was also produced by Trim and had previously appeared in the Thunderbirds episodes "The Man from MI.5" and "The Duchess Assignment". It was later seen in the Joe 90's "The Race".

The incidental music, performed by a 16-member band, was recorded during a four-hour studio session held on 27 August 1967. Music for "The Trap" was also recorded during this session. Two pieces from "Model Spy" – "Models on a Train" and "Cocktail Music" – are included on the CD release of the Captain Scarlet soundtrack.

== Reception ==
James Stansfield of Den of Geek ranks "Model Spy" the eighth-best episode of Captain Scarlet, praising its "high-class spy thriller feel" and decision to "[go] a bit James Bond." He compliments the French Riviera setting and "impressive" monotrain crash, as well as the originality in casting fashion models as Mysteron agents and having the Spectrum team abandon their codenames during their assignment. (However, Chris Bentley notes that while the last point is true of Scarlet and Blue, the two Angels still go by their call signs "Destiny" and "Symphony".) Chris Drake and Graeme Bassett write that the theme of espionage, combined with the setting, produces a "Man from U.N.C.L.E.–type" episode that provides a "break from the routine" of interplanetary conflict. They praise the technical aspects of the vehicle chase, commenting that it features "some convincing antics from a couple of stringless puppets towards the end."

In a negative review, writer Fred McNamara calls the episode an "absolute disaster", elaborating that it "simply doesn't function. The premise is undercooked whilst the plot itself is full of superfluous characters and nonsensical judgement from both the Mysterons and Spectrum." Although he finds the episode interesting for being one of only two (the other being "Place of Angels") to feature women as Mysteron agents, he considers all of the female characters – including regulars Destiny and Symphony Angel – to be underdeveloped and poorly used. McNamara also believes that the episode lacks a sense of genuine threat, arguing that both Spectrum and the Mysterons are "feeble" and inept and that Verdain is not presented as a credible target whose assassination would have grave repercussions for his spy network ("Why would [Verdain's] death cause [the European Area Intelligence Service] to shut up shop? [...] We're given too vague a description of an organisation to know what it does and thus why we should care about the consequences of it succumbing to the Mysterons.")

Shane M. Dallmann of Video Watchdog magazine writes that although the "gimmicky" episode "has its silly moments", it is significant for revealing Scarlet and Blue's real names as well as for the "brutal highpoint" of Verdain being pushed out of Black and Helga's moving car. Andrew Pixley and Julie Rogers of Starburst also comment on this scene, listing Verdain being "dropped on his head" as one of the series' more violent moments. Bruce Eder of AllMusic praises the soundtrack, describing "Cocktail Music" as "one of the best pieces of instrumental pop music of its genre and era".
