= Place of Angels =

- Captain Scarlet and the Mysterons episode
- Episode no.: Episode 27
- Directed by: Leo Eaton
- Written by: Leo Eaton
- Cinematography by: Julien Lugrin
- Editing by: Harry MacDonald
- Production code: SCA 23
- Original air date: 8 March 1968

Guest character voices
- Sylvia Anderson as Judy Chapman; Gary Files as the guard and a mechanic; Martin King as the airliner captain; Jeremy Wilkin as Dr Denton and the voice of Spectrum New York

Episode chronology
← Previous "Flight 104"	Next → "Expo 2068"

"Place of Angels" is the 27th episode of Captain Scarlet and the Mysterons, a British Supermarionation television series created by Gerry and Sylvia Anderson and filmed by their production company Century 21 Productions. Written and directed by Leo Eaton, it was first broadcast on 8 March 1968 on ATV Midlands.

Set in 2068, the series depicts a "war of nerves" between Earth and the Mysterons: a race of Martians with the power to create functioning copies of destroyed people or objects and use them to carry out acts of aggression against humanity. Earth is defended by a military organisation called Spectrum, whose top agent, Captain Scarlet, was killed by the Mysterons and replaced by a reconstruction that subsequently broke free of their control. Scarlet's double has a self-healing power that enables him to recover from injuries that would be fatal to anyone else, making him Spectrum's best asset in its fight against the Mysterons.

In "Place of Angels", Spectrum pursues a Mysteron agent who has stolen a vial of synthetic virus with the potential to kill millions of people.

== Plot ==
At a microbiological laboratory near Manchester, England, Dr Denton and his assistant, Judy Chapman, activate a culture of K14, a synthetic virus. Later, as Chapman is driving home in her car, Captain Black sets a trap for her by blocking the road with a fuel tanker. Chapman crashes into the tanker and is killed instantly, whereupon she is reconstructed by the Mysterons to carry out their threat to destroy the "Place of the Angels". Returning to the laboratory, the Mysteron agent strangles a security guard with a pair of mechanical arms and steals the vial containing the K14. She then boards an airliner bound for New York.

Denton contacts Spectrum Cloudbase to request assistance and Colonel White dispatches Captains Scarlet and Blue to the laboratory. On arrival, Scarlet and Blue learn that K14 is the most lethal virus ever developed and that were the vial to be opened, its contents would kill up to ten million people.

When Chapman is sighted at New York International Airport, Scarlet and Blue fly to the United States and chase the reconstruction along the Interstate Highway in a Spectrum Pursuit Vehicle. Acting on the telepathically relayed instructions of Black, Chapman abandons her car, leaving behind what appears to be the K14 vial with its seal broken. A decontamination operation is conducted and Scarlet and Blue are placed in quarantine. However, when the samples from the car test negative for K14, it becomes evident that Chapman has tricked Spectrum and still has the virus.

Hours pass and Chapman is spotted in numerous locations across North America, including Los Angeles. From the city's name, which is Spanish for "The Angels", Scarlet deduces that the Mysteron threat is against LA.

Flying a Spectrum Passenger Jet, Scarlet and Blue pursue Chapman as she drives along the Colorado River. White informs the officers that the reconstruction is heading for the Boulder Dam, presumably to release the K14 into the Los Angeles reservoir and contaminate the city's water supply. Scarlet ejects and lands on the dam. Despite taking a bullet from the armed Chapman, he returns fire and the reconstruction loses her footing, falling over the side of the dam to her death. Scarlet manages to retrieve the dropped vial from a ledge before it is lost in the reservoir. A frantic White radios Scarlet, who replies that the "Place of Angels" is safe.

== Regular voice cast ==
- Ed Bishop as Captain Blue
- Cy Grant as Lieutenant Green
- Donald Gray as Colonel White, Captain Black and the Mysterons
- Janna Hill as Symphony Angel
- Francis Matthews as Captain Scarlet
- Liz Morgan as Destiny Angel

== Production ==
I'd previously done a lot of writing on my own and wanted to write scripts from the start. Script editor Tony Barwick agreed that if I gave him a treatment he liked, he'd let me write the script. I'd been thinking about writing a science-fiction short story about someone releasing poison into a big-city reservoir so decided to turn it into a script.

— Eaton on his inspiration for the episode

Eaton, who had worked as an assistant director on The Saint, joined Century 21 as a first assistant director during the pre-production of Captain Scarlet. The 22-year-old quickly expressed an interest in writing and directing; after making several TV advertisements for the Thunderbirds-themed ice lollies Zoom and Fab, he was given the opportunity to write and direct a Captain Scarlet episode. "Place of Angels" was Eaton's first filmed script as well as his TV series directorial debut.

A number of script changes were made prior to filming: the episode's working title was "The City of Angels" and as originally scripted the Mysterons' threat was to destroy "the population of the City of Angels". In an unfilmed scene, Scarlet and Blue were to arrive at the Manchester laboratory and learn that the security guard had been strangled not by hand, but with machinery. Eaton said that he included the "mechanical arms" because it was "something I thought would be a little bit different and make it feel more interesting." The ending was also altered: the original intention was for Scarlet to retrieve the K14 from a binoculars case in which the reconstructed Chapman had placed the vial before falling to her death.

The opening scene, in which Dr Denton activates the virus, features incidental music that was originally recorded for Stingray. The scale models of the New York and Los Angeles airports were built partly with props first seen in two Thunderbirds episodes, "The Duchess Assignment" and "The Cham-Cham". The airliner that flies Chapman to New York was a re-use of the RTL2 Transporter scale model from "The Cham-Cham", while its puppet-sized cabin was a re-use of the interior of Flight 104 from the Captain Scarlet episode of the same name. The scale models of the decontamination helicopter and dome respectively first appeared as a rescue helicopter in the film Thunderbirds Are Go (1966) and a Frost Line Outer Space Defence System dome in the Captain Scarlet episode "Avalanche".

"Place of Angels" features a rare appearance by Spectrum's Dr Fawn. However, as Fawn's voice actor Charles Tingwell had left the series before this episode was made, the character does not have any lines.

== Broadcast and reception ==
"Place of Angels" had its first UK-wide network broadcast on 29 April 1994 on BBC2. The transmission was delayed by ten minutes due to over-running live coverage of the World Snooker Championship semi-final between Steve Davis and Stephen Hendry.

=== Critical response ===
Anthony Clark of sci-fi-online.com describes the plot as "not great" but considers it better-paced than that of "Flight 104". He also writes that the episode has a "reasonable sense of tension and some sharp direction".

The episode has drawn comment for its violence. Andrew Thomas of Dreamwatch magazine considers the death of the original Chapman, culminating in the sight of the character's "mangled body", to be one of the series' more violent moments. Andrew Pixley and Julie Rogers of Starburst note the horror of the reconstruction's death, which Shane M. Dallmann of Video Watchdog describes as "one of the series' more show-stopping demises". Pixley and Rogers also note the "cryptic" nature of the Mysteron threat against the eponymous "place of angels".

Fred McNamara writes that Spectrum's pursuit of Chapman is "a tad cumbersome" and the overall episode arguably feels more like an "extended chase sequence" than a complete story. However, he praises its sense of "menace and mystery", describing the strangulation of the security guard as "great fun to watch" and the gunfight between Scarlet and Chapman as "splendid". He considers "Place of Angels" remarkable for being the only episode of Captain Scarlet to incorporate a theme of biological warfare.
