= Captain Scarlet and the Mysterons =

British science fiction TV series (1967–1968)

- Genre: Science fiction
- Created by: Gerry & Sylvia Anderson
- Voices of: Sylvia Anderson; Ed Bishop; Gary Files; Cy Grant; Donald Gray; David Healy; Janna Hill; Martin King; Francis Matthews; Paul Maxwell; Liz Morgan; Lian-Shin Yang; Bud Tingwell; Jeremy Wilkin; Neil McCallum; Shane Rimmer
- Opening theme: "The Mysterons"
- Ending theme: "Captain Scarlet"
- Composer: Barry Gray
- Country of origin: United Kingdom
- Original language: English
- No. of series: 1
- No. of episodes: 32 (list of episodes)

Production
- Executive producer: Gerry Anderson
- Producer: Reg Hill
- Running time: 25 minutes
- Production company: Century 21 Television Productions
- Budget: £1.5 million

Original release
- Network: ITV
- Release: 29 September 1967 – 14 May 1968

Related
- New Captain Scarlet

Captain Scarlet and the Mysterons, often shortened to Captain Scarlet, is a British science fiction television series created by Gerry and Sylvia Anderson and filmed by their production company Century 21 for ITC Entertainment. It is the sixth Anderson series to be filmed using a form of electronic marionette puppetry dubbed "Supermarionation" combined with scale model special effects. Running to thirty-two 25-minute episodes, it was first broadcast on ITV regional franchises between 1967 and 1968 and has since aired in more than 40 other countries, including the United States, Canada, Australia, New Zealand and Japan.

Set in 2068, Captain Scarlet presents a "war of nerves" between Earth and the Mysterons, a race of aliens operating from Mars who possess partial control over matter. When a misunderstanding causes human astronauts to attack their city on Mars, the Mysterons swear revenge and launch reprisals against Earth. These are countered by Spectrum, a worldwide security organisation. In the first episode, Spectrum agent Captain Scarlet acquires the Mysterons' self-healing power of "retrometabolism" and is rendered "indestructible", being able to recover from injuries that would normally be fatal. Scarlet immediately becomes Spectrum's top asset in its fight against the Mysterons.

Captain Scarlet, the eighth of the Andersons' ten puppet series, was preceded by Thunderbirds and followed by Joe 90 and The Secret Service. In terms of visual aesthetic, it marked a departure from earlier series in its use of puppets that were sculpted to realistic body proportions. Repeated several times in the UK, it has generated tie-ins ranging from toy cars and action figures to audio plays and novels, as well as strips in the weekly children's comic TV Century 21.

Compared to earlier Anderson productions, Captain Scarlet is widely regarded as "darker" in tone and less suited to children because of its violent content, as well as its themes of alien aggression and interplanetary war. The change in puppet design has divided opinion and the decision to make the protagonist "indestructible" has been brought into question. The series has been praised for its use of a multinational, multiethnic puppet cast and depiction of a utopian future Earth. A computer-animated remake, New Captain Scarlet, first aired in 2005.

== Plot ==
The series begins in 2068. In the first episode, the crew of the Zero-X spacecraft are investigating the surface of Mars after mysterious radio signals are found to be coming from the planet. (Note: Production documents confirm that the Zero-X is of the type introduced in the film Thunderbirds Are Go, placing Captain Scarlet in the same fictional universe as Thunderbirds (Bentley 2001, p. 59). Character biographies in Bentley's The Complete Book of Captain Scarlet also place Fireball XL5 and Stingray in this universe (Bentley 2001, pp. 46–47, 50).) (Note: Written by Gerry and Sylvia Anderson. Directed by Desmond Saunders (29 September 1967). "The Mysterons". Captain Scarlet and the Mysterons. Episode 1.) The source is discovered to be an alien city, which the astronauts destroy in a missile attack after mistaking a surveillance device for a weapon. The city's inhabitants, the Mysterons, are a collective of sentient computers that possess partial control over matter and communicate in a deep, echoing voice. After using their power of "reversing matter" to rebuild their city, they vow revenge for humanity's unwarranted aggression and declare war on Earth.

Reversing matter, also called "retrometabolism", enables the Mysterons to re-create people and objects as facsimiles that they can control. (Note: Written by Tony Barwick. Directed by David Lane (6 October 1967). "Winged Assassin". Captain Scarlet and the Mysterons. Episode 2.) They use it to wage a "war of nerves" against Earth, issuing threats against specific targets (from world leaders and military installations to whole cities and continents) and then destroying and reconstructing whatever instruments are needed (whether humans or objects) to carry out their plans. The Mysterons' presence is indicated by twin circles of green light that they project onto scenes of destruction and reconstruction. Although the Mysterons are able to influence events from Mars, their actions on Earth are usually performed by their replicated intermediaries.

Zero-X mission leader Captain Black becomes the Mysterons' primary agent when they seize control of his mind. (Note: Black's transformation into a Mysteron agent is indicated by a paling of his skin combined with a deepening of his voice to match that of the Mysterons.) Prior to the events of the series, Black was an officer in Spectrum, a worldwide security organisation that mobilises all its resources to counter the Mysteron threat. Spectrum's senior agents hold military ranks and colour codenames. They are posted to the organisation's headquarters, Cloudbase—an airborne aircraft carrier stationed 40,000 feet (7.6 mi; 12 km) above the Earth's surface—where they answer to its commander-in-chief, Colonel White. (Note: In communications, Spectrum personnel use the expression "S.I.G." ("Spectrum Is Green") as their affirmative code. The negative, "S.I.R." ("Spectrum Is Red"), is rarely used in the series.) (Note: Written by Tony Barwick. Directed by Brian Burgess (9 February 1968). "Dangerous Rendezvous". Captain Scarlet and the Mysterons. Episode 19.) Cloudbase is defended by Angel Interceptor fighters flown by an all-female team of pilots led by Destiny Angel. The base's computer systems are controlled by White's assistant, Lieutenant Green. (Note: "Lieutenant" is generally pronounced in the British manner, /lɛfˈtɛnənt/ (lef-TEN-ənt), by all but the American characters.) Spectrum also incorporates a fleet of armoured Spectrum Pursuit Vehicles (SPVs), which are hidden in secret locations around the world, as well as patrol cars, maximum-security transports, passenger jet aircraft and machine gun-equipped helicopters.

Captain Scarlet becomes Spectrum's top asset in its fight against the Mysterons following the events of the first episode, in which the Mysterons attempt to assassinate the World President as their first act of retaliation. (Note: In Captain Scarlet, power from many individual nations has been vested in a world government, headed by a president and possessing its own military and security forces. Spectrum is a unified operation designed to be unhindered by interdepartmental red tape, thus providing a more efficient service (Bentley 2001, p. 43).) The Mysterons engineer a road accident that kills the original Scarlet and replace him with a reconstruction. After being shot by Captain Blue and falling to its death from the top of a tower, the reconstruction returns to life with the consciousness of the original Scarlet restored, and is thereafter free of Mysteron control. (Note: According to The Complete Book of Captain Scarlet, the Mysterons intended Scarlet's double to be "indestructible" (Bentley 2001, p. 44). This is in contrast with other reconstructions, which are permanently destroyed when killed.) With his new Mysteron body, Scarlet possesses two extraordinary abilities: he can sense other reconstructions nearby; and if he is injured or killed, his retrometabolism restores him to full health, making him virtually "indestructible". As hostilities with Mars continue, Scarlet repeatedly sacrifices himself to thwart the Mysterons, secure in the knowledge that he will return to face them again.

Over the course of the series, it is found that Mysteron reconstructions are particularly vulnerable to electricity and can be identified through X-rays, which cannot penetrate their alien biology. (Note: Written by Richard Conway and Stephen J. Mattick. Directed by Ken Turner (17 November 1967). "Operation Time". Captain Scarlet and the Mysterons. Episode 8.) These discoveries allow Spectrum to develop two anti-Mysteron devices, the Mysteron Gun and Mysteron Detector. (Note: In "Spectrum Strikes Back", it is stated that the Mysteron Gun is "the only gun that kills a Mysteron." However, other episodes show the Mysterons to be vulnerable to conventional means of destruction.) (Note: Written by Tony Barwick. Directed by Ken Turner (24 November 1967). "Spectrum Strikes Back". Captain Scarlet and the Mysterons. Episode 9.) A three-episode story arc focuses on the discovery of a Mysteron outpost on the Moon, its destruction by Spectrum, and Spectrum's efforts to negotiate with the Mysterons after converting the base's power source into an interplanetary communication device. (Note: Written by Tony Barwick. Directed by Robert Lynn (15 December 1967). "Lunarville 7". Captain Scarlet and the Mysterons. Episode 12.) (Note: Written by Tony Barwick. Directed by Ken Turner (26 January 1968). "Crater 101". Captain Scarlet and the Mysterons. Episode 17.) A failed attempt to survey Mars from space, (Note: Written by Tony Barwick. Directed by Robert Lynn (2 February 1968). "Shadow of Fear". Captain Scarlet and the Mysterons. Episode 18.) aborted military conferences (Note: Written by Alan Pattillo. Directed by Alan Perry (10 November 1967). "The Trap". Captain Scarlet and the Mysterons. Episode 7.) (Note: Written by Tony Barwick. Directed by Robert Lynn (1 March 1968). "Flight 104". Captain Scarlet and the Mysterons. Episode 22.) and the sabotaged construction of a new Earth space fleet (Note: Written by Tony Barwick. Directed by Ken Turner (12 March 1968). "Noose of Ice". Captain Scarlet and the Mysterons. Episode 24.) prevent Spectrum from taking the fight to the Mysterons, and the organisation fails to capture Captain Black on multiple occasions. (Note: Written by Tony Barwick. Directed by Alan Perry (20 October 1967). "Manhunt". Captain Scarlet and the Mysterons. Episode 4.) (Note: Written by Tony Barwick. Directed by Alan Perry (8 December 1967). "The Heart of New York". Captain Scarlet and the Mysterons. Episode 16.) (Note: Written by Bill Hedley. Directed by Ken Turner (29 December 1967). "Model Spy". Captain Scarlet and the Mysterons. Episode 18.) (Note: Written by Tony Barwick. Directed by Alan Perry (23 February 1968). "Treble Cross". Captain Scarlet and the Mysterons. Episode 21.) In the penultimate episode, the Mysterons destroy Cloudbase itself, but this is revealed to be a nightmare dreamt by one of the Angels. (Note: Written by Tony Barwick. Directed by Ken Turner (7 May 1968). "Attack on Cloudbase". Captain Scarlet and the Mysterons. Episode 31.) The final episode is a clip show that leaves the conflict between Earth and Mars unresolved. (Note: Written by Tony Barwick. Directed by Ken Turner (14 May 1968). "The Inquisition". Captain Scarlet and the Mysterons. Episode 32.)

== Production ==
=== Development ===
I thought we should make a show about the Martians, but then there were doubts being expressed by scientists as to whether the so-called "canals" on Mars were really man-made. Since we were well into pre-production, I came up with the idea of making the Martians invisible, so if they did come up with conclusive evidence that there was no life on Mars, I could say, "Ha-ha, yes there is – but you can't see it."

— Gerry Anderson on devising the Mysterons

When efforts to secure a US network broadcast of Thunderbirds fell through in July 1966, Lew Grade, the owner of AP Films (APF), capped Thunderbirds Series Two at six episodes and cancelled the production. Having overseen APF's work since the making of Supercar in 1960, Grade was keen for Supermarionation to penetrate the lucrative American market and believed that a new concept would stand a better chance of landing a network sale than a second series of Thunderbirds.

Gerry Anderson was therefore required to come up with an idea for a new series. He had once been inspired by the thought of creating a live-action police drama in which the hero is unexpectedly murdered partway through the series and replaced by a new lead character. Now returning to this idea, Anderson realised that a major selling point could be a character who is killed at the end of each episode and resurrected by the start of the next. This, coupled with contemporary theories about the possibility of life on Mars, led to the idea of an interplanetary war between Earth and its neighbour and a security organisation being called on to defend humanity. After further thought, Anderson decided that "Scarlet" would be a suitably unusual name for the organisation's "indestructible" top agent, while his partner could be called "Blue". From this, Anderson resolved that all the personnel would have colour codenames and the organisation would be called "Spectrum". Aware that white light is composed of—and can be broken down into—the colours of the spectrum, he named Spectrum's leader Colonel White.

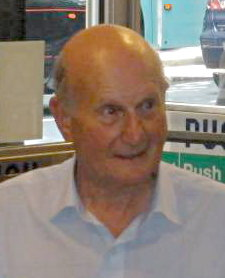
Anderson in 2009

Intrigued by the phrase "life as we know it", Anderson wanted to set his enemy aliens apart from the conventional extraterrestrials of 1960s TV and film. Therefore, while devising the Mysterons, he worked from a basis of "life as we don't know it", making the aliens a collective of sentient computers rather than organic life forms (though their exact nature is not explicitly stated in the series itself). The intention was that the original Mysterons were extragalactic beings that established a base on Mars in the distant past. In the early 20th century they abandoned the planet, leaving their computers behind.

Anderson's memories of the Second World War provided inspiration for a number of design aspects. For example, he remembered that during the Battle of Britain, RAF pilots had struggled to counter German attacks quickly, because having to take off from the ground meant that it took a long time to intercept the enemy. He therefore made Spectrum's headquarters, Cloudbase, an airborne aircraft carrier. According to Anderson, the Mysteron rings were inspired by a TV advertisement for wool that featured the Woolmark logo being projected onto a woman.

With "The Mysterons" as their working title, the Andersons wrote a pilot script in August 1966. This differed significantly from the completed first episode. It had been conceived that Scarlet's Mysteron reconstruction would be resurrected using an advanced computer, after which he would no longer be truly flesh and blood but a "mechanical man" akin to an android. (Note: The audio play Introducing Captain Scarlet, set during the events of the first episode, indicates that Spectrum use an advanced computer to restore Scarlet's human personality.) Another plan, also dropped, was for each episode to feature a "guest star" puppet voiced by a famous actor: the World President, for example, was intended to be voiced by Patrick McGoohan.

With Gerry Anderson serving primarily as executive producer, most of the writing was done by Tony Barwick, who had written for Thunderbirds. Initially Captain Scarlet's script editor, Barwick went on to author 18 episodes himself while substantially revising other writers' work. Discussing his writing in a 1986 interview, Barwick compared the premise and characters of Captain Scarlet to those of Thunderbirds—for example, likening Spectrum to International Rescue, and the character of Captain Black to recurring Thunderbirds villain the Hood.

=== Casting and characters ===
Main characters
Codename	Name (Note: Scarlet and Blue are the only characters whose real names are revealed in the series itself. The others originate from tie-ins.)	Nationality	Voiced by
Captain Scarlet	Paul Metcalfe	British	Francis Matthews
Captain Blue	Adam Svenson	American	Ed Bishop
Colonel White	Charles Gray	British	Donald Gray
Lieutenant Green	Seymour Griffiths	Trinidadian	Cy Grant
Captain Black	Conrad Turner	British	Donald Gray (Note: Before he falls victim to the Mysterons in the first episode, Captain Black is voiced by Jeremy Wilkin.)
Captain Ochre	Richard Fraser	American	Jeremy Wilkin
Captain Magenta	Patrick Donaghue	Irish	Gary Files
Captain Grey	Bradley Holden	American	Paul Maxwell
Doctor Fawn	Edward Wilkie	Australian	Bud Tingwell
Destiny Angel	Juliette Pontoin	French	Liz Morgan
Symphony Angel	Karen Wainwright	American	Janna Hill
Rhapsody Angel	Dianne Simms	British	Liz Morgan
Melody Angel	Magnolia Jones	American	Sylvia Anderson
Harmony Angel	Chan Kwan	Japanese	Liz Morgan; Lian-Shin

Captain Scarlet had the largest regular character voice cast of any Supermarionation production. Its use of a British protagonist was a departure from earlier series like Thunderbirds, whose lead characters had been written as Americans to increase their appeal to the profitable US market. Stephen La Rivière suggests that the producers had been encouraged to give greater prominence to British characters following the transatlantic success of UK series like The Avengers, The Baron and The Saint, which had made it "altogether more acceptable to have English lead characters". Chris Drake and Graeme Bassett argue that the voice acting in Captain Scarlet was less exaggerated than before, relating this to the puppets' transition to realistic proportions. According to Simon Archer and Marcus Hearn, the proliferation of British accents from Thunderbirds to Captain Scarlet changed the sound of Supermarionation and its impression on the viewer.

Francis Matthews, who supplied the voice of Captain Scarlet, had turned down offers to voice characters in Thunderbirds. According to Matthews, Gerry Anderson went to great lengths to cast him after being impressed by his imitation of Cary Grant in a radio programme, and the actor did indeed model the voice of Scarlet on Grant's Anglo-American accent. Anderson, however, stated in his biography that the Grant impression was Matthews' choice at audition, and while it was not the kind of voice he had in mind, he was happy for Matthews to use it.

Matthews' co-star in the film Dracula: Prince of Darkness (1966) had been Bud Tingwell, who was chosen to voice Cloudbase medical officer Dr Fawn. Tingwell, who had provided voices for Thunderbirds Series Two and Thunderbirds Are Go, had been recommended by fellow Australian Ray Barrett, a regular voice artist on Stingray and Thunderbirds. Due to theatre commitments, Tingwell left the series following the completion of the first 12 episodes. Also departing at that time was Paul Maxwell, the voice of Captain Grey (and previously Steve Zodiac in Fireball XL5 and Captain Travers in Thunderbirds Are Go), who left to take up the role of Steve Tanner in Coronation Street. In Tingwell and Maxwell's absence, Fawn and Grey's roles were reduced to a handful of non-speaking appearances, though guest characters voiced by the two actors can be heard in flashbacks to earlier episodes.

Cy Grant, the voice of Lieutenant Green, had been known to the Andersons for his appearances on Tonight, in which he sang calypsos inspired by current affairs. The casting of Grant led to that of Ed Bishop as Captain Blue. Bishop, who was working in theatre and had the same agent as Grant, recalled in an interview: "And [my agent's representative] said, 'Oh, by the way, Mr Anderson, we've just taken on a new, young American actor'—shows you how long ago it was—'a new American actor, name of Edward Bishop. And we know how much you like American voices. Would you like to meet him as well?'"

Donald Gray, who had been typecast after playing Detective Mark Saber in The Vise, was resorting to voice work to sustain his acting career. He had three regular roles in Captain Scarlet: Colonel White, the Mysterons and Captain Black (who, after being taken over by the Mysterons, speaks in their voice). The deep, echoing tones of Black and the Mysterons were created by recording Gray's lines at high speed and then playing them back at normal speed. However, this was not always applied consistently, causing the pitch of the Mysteron voice to differ in some episodes.

The voice of Captain Ochre was provided by Jeremy Wilkin, who had voiced Virgil Tracy in Thunderbirds Series Two. Captain Magenta was voiced by Gary Files, who had played supporting voices in Thunderbird 6. Liz Morgan, who was new to the Anderson productions, voiced Destiny and Rhapsody Angels. Sylvia Anderson, the voice of Lady Penelope in Thunderbirds, took the role of Melody Angel, while Canadian actress Janna Hill voiced Symphony. Morgan was additionally cast as Harmony Angel and voiced the character in five episodes. About a third of the way through the dialogue recording sessions, the role was transferred to Chinese actress Lian-Shin, who voiced the character in only one episode ("The Launching") but was credited for 20 episodes.

Supporting character voices were performed by Anderson, Files, Hill, Maxwell, Morgan, Tingwell and Wilkin. Completing the credited cast were David Healy and Martin King. Shane Rimmer, previously heard as Scott Tracy in Thunderbirds, made several uncredited voice contributions in addition to writing for the series. Neil McCallum voiced guest characters in four episodes but was also uncredited. After Captain Scarlet, six members of the voice cast continued their association with the Andersons. Healy voiced Shane Weston in Joe 90 and Files voiced Matthew Harding in The Secret Service. Wilkin, Morgan and King all had various supporting roles in these two series. Bishop later played Commander Ed Straker in UFO, the Andersons' first live-action series.

Character dialogue was recorded once a fortnight, with the cast working through up to four episodes per session, at the Anvil Films Recording Studio (now Denham Film Studios) in Buckinghamshire. (Note: Anvil Films Recording Studio: 51°33′48″N 0°29′55″W (dialogue recording)) Each actor was paid 15 guineas (15 pounds and 15 shillings; equivalent to £251 in 2025) per episode, plus repeat fees, no matter how many lines he or she spoke. As the actors were not given the opportunity to tour the puppet studios until their work was finished, they had no visualisation of their characters during the dialogue recording. This was to Morgan's regret: "We all said that we wished we had seen the puppets before doing the dialogue, as it would have been helpful to have something physical to base the voices on. I knew that Destiny was French and that Rhapsody had to be frightfully 'Sloaney', but that was about it."

=== Design and effects ===
The scale model-making and special effects were handled by a separate unit headed by effects director Derek Meddings. It comprised two full-time crews and a "second unit" responsible for shots depicting flying aircraft. One of the series' technical innovations was that the noses of miniature vehicles would now "dip" as they came to a stop, to imitate the sudden application of brakes on a life-sized vehicle. The vehicles were designed by Meddings or his assistant Mike Trim. The former created Cloudbase, the SPV and the Angel fighter (the last of these during a flight to New York), while the latter produced many of the series' minor vehicles. The six-foot-long (1.83 m) Cloudbase filming model proved too heavy to be suspended on wires, so was mounted on a pole instead. Some of Trim's creations, such as the Spectrum Patrol Car, were originally meant to appear in only one episode, but proved to be so popular with the producers that they became regular features. As production continued, Trim's responsibilities grew as Meddings devoted more of his time to Thunderbird 6.

==== Puppet design ====
The changes to the puppets' design made their movements more stilted. To make the puppets "walk", the crew would hold them by the legs and move them forward using a "bobbing" motion, with the camera filming above the waist. The puppets' control wires also limited the actions that they could perform. In this clip from "Attack on Cloudbase", the shot cuts away from Captains Scarlet and Blue when they walk through a doorway, as the wires made it impossible to film such entrances in a single shot.

Supermarionation—a technique by which puppets' mouth movements were electronically synchronised with recorded dialogue—was first employed during the production of Four Feather Falls in 1960. On all the Anderson series prior to Captain Scarlet, the solenoid that powered the automatic mouth movements had been housed in the cranium, which caused the puppets' heads to appear disproportionately large compared to the rest of their bodies. Upsizing the bodies to match the heads would not have been practical, as the puppets would have become too heavy to operate effectively and it would have meant having to enlarge all the sets as well. The oversized heads gave the puppets a caricatured look that frustrated Gerry Anderson, who wanted the design to use natural body proportions. Before the pre-production of Captain Scarlet, producers Reg Hill and John Read created a new type of puppet with the solenoid built into the chest, enabling the heads to be reduced to a realistic size.

After being sculpted in Plasticine, the puppet heads were moulded on a silicone rubber base and finished in fibreglass. At heights ranging from 20 to 24 inches (51 to 61 cm) (approximately one-third life size), the new generation of puppets were the same height as previous ones. As in earlier series, the main characters were given interchangeable heads with a range of expressions; these included "smiler", "frowner" and "blinker" heads. Because episodes would be filmed in pairs on separate stages, the "expressionless" versions were made in duplicate. The costumes were designed by Sylvia Anderson, who drew inspiration from the work of Pierre Cardin (in particular, his 1966 "Cosmonaut" collection) when devising the Spectrum uniforms.

Despite their realistic form, the new puppets were even harder to animate on set, ironically making the design less life-like than Gerry Anderson had intended. The switch to accurate proportions upset the puppets' weight distribution. When standing, they often had to be held in place with clamps and tape to prevent them from wobbling. The smaller heads made it harder to obtain close-ups. Additionally, as most of the wires were head‑mounted, the smaller head size reduced the puppeteers' control, making movements jerkier. To limit the amount of movement required, characters were often shown sitting at moving desks or standing on moving walkways. For example, Colonel White has a rotating desk and Lieutenant Green operates the Cloudbase computer from a sliding chair. Puppeteer Jan King commented:

The Captain Scarlet puppets were not built to walk. They were too heavy and not weighted properly anyway [...] It is virtually impossible to get a string puppet to walk convincingly on film unless it is a very caricatured puppet. In Captain Scarlet, if a puppet had to move off-screen, it was done in a head-and-shoulders shot – the floor puppeteer would hold the legs of the puppet and then move the puppet physically out of shot at the right time, trying to make the body and shoulders move as if the puppet were walking.

The "under-controlled" puppets described by King had no wires and were manipulated from the waist. One advantage of this method was that a puppet could pass through a doorway without necessitating a break in the shot. For scenes with characters sitting in aircraft cockpits, the crew built variations on the under-controlled design that comprised only a head and torso. These were operated using levers and wires located underneath the set.

Scarlet's appearance has been compared to that of his voice actor, Francis Matthews, as well as Roger Moore. Ed Bishop, the voice of Captain Blue, believed that the character was modelled on him. However, sculptor Terry Curtis said that he used himself as the template and simply added a blond wig when he learnt that Bishop was to voice the character. A James Bond fan, Curtis based Captain Grey on Sean Connery and Destiny Angel on Ursula Andress, Connery's co-star in Dr No (1962). Lieutenant Green was modelled on Cy Grant, who voiced the character; Rhapsody Angel on Jean Shrimpton; Melody Angel on Eartha Kitt; and Harmony Angel on Tsai Chin.

On earlier series, guest characters had been sculpted and re-sculpted in clay episode by episode. For Captain Scarlet, these roles were played by a "repertory company" of over 50 permanent puppets that were made to the same standards of workmanship as the main characters. Called "revamps", these puppets were superficially altered for each new role by changing the colours or styles of their wigs, or adding or removing facial hair or eyeglasses. Puppets from Captain Scarlet appeared in supporting roles in the last two Supermarionation series, Joe 90 and The Secret Service.

==== Response to puppets ====
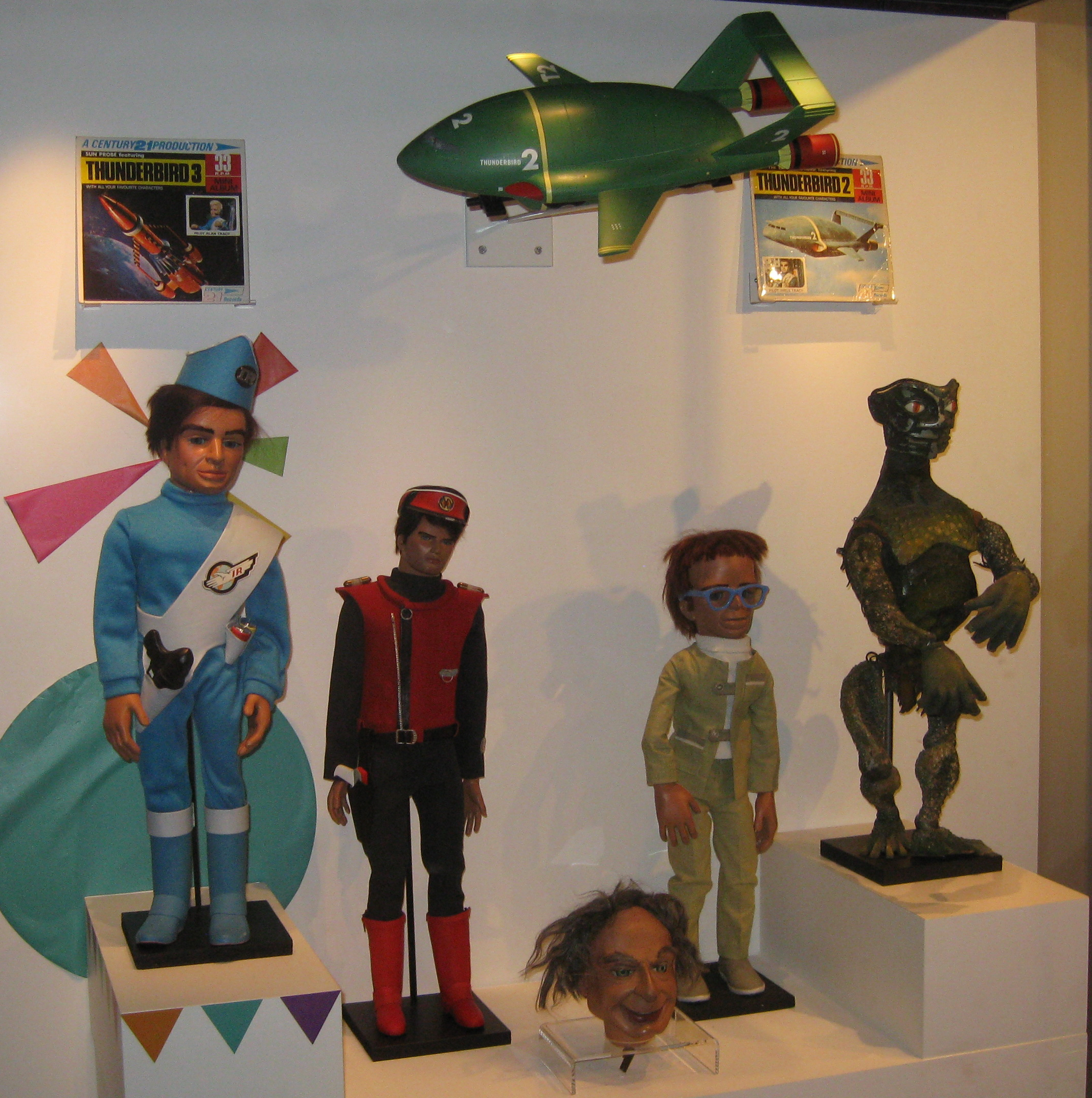
Replica puppets of Scott Tracy from Thunderbirds (left) and Captain Scarlet, showing the different body proportions of the two generations

The redesigned puppets have attracted a mixed response from crew members and commentators. Some of the crew believed that the new marionettes lacked the charm of the previous generation due to the accurate proportions that were now being used. Director David Lane recalled that when he first saw the prototype, "it was as if there was a little dead person in [the box] ... because it was perfect in all its proportions it just looked odd." Sculptor John Brown remembered putting the prototype next to the Lady Penelope puppet from Thunderbirds and gauging his colleagues' reactions: "When they saw it, some people were horrified by the difference. Some didn't like it, some did." It has been argued that facial expression was sacrificed to make the overall appearance more realistic. Curtis recalls:

The changes of expression on those puppets had to be perfect and in no way exaggerated like the old ones were. I remember when [fellow puppet designer] Tim Cooksey did Colonel White, he had a lot of trouble doing different expressions as the face was just so realistic. I had a similar problem with Captain Blue. I remember I did a Blue "smiler" head and people could hardly tell the difference between that and the normal one.

Fellow sculptor John Blundall called the new design "ridiculous". He criticised attempts to make the puppets appear more life-like, reasoning that "we always try to do with puppets what you can't do with humans." He suggested that the move from caricature to realism came at the expense of "character and personality", arguing that "if the puppet appears completely natural, the audience no longer has to use its imagination." Effects director Derek Meddings thought that while the new puppets made "very convincing miniature people", they were flawed because viewers "couldn't identify one from the other. The heads were so small they didn't have any character to their faces." From a practical perspective, supervising puppeteer Christine Glanville considered the puppets "awful", remembering that their smaller, lighter heads would not move smoothly: "If you wanted them to turn their heads, then more often than not there would be someone out of shot, with their fingers just above the puppet's head, actually turning it round."

Anderson said that he pushed for the new design to satisfy the audience, regarding it not as "a case of moving to a new technique, but more a case of incorporating new ideas with existing methods." In later years he expressed doubts about the wisdom of the redesign: "[T]he problem was that exact and precise movements became more vital than ever and that caused us terrible difficulties."

The new design has been well received by Vincent Terrace, Jeff Evans and John Peel. Praising the transfer of the electronics from the heads to the bodies, Evans describes the puppets as "perfect in proportion". Peel argues that the increased realism would not have put off audiences familiar with the earlier design. A contrary view is held by Daniel O'Brien, who states that the loss of the puppets' "idiosyncratic character" reduced them to the level of "deluxe Action Men". Commenting on the costume design, Mark Bould praises the series' "commitment to fashion" and especially commends the design of the Angel uniforms.

==== Opening and closing titles ====
The titles on the series were always devised by me [...] When it came to Captain Scarlet I was frightened people would say, 'Oh, it's the same old "Crash! Bang! Wallop!" stuff again,' so I made a conscious effort to do something totally different. I don't think I necessarily did the right thing.

— Gerry Anderson (2001)

All episodes, except the first, have two title sequences. The first of these, incorporating the title card and principal production credits, is set in a run-down alleyway and presented from the point of view of an unseen gunman. Turning a corner, he comes face to face with Captain Scarlet and opens fire, only to be shot dead by a single round from Scarlet's handgun. The words "Captain Scarlet" appear letter by letter in time with the seven strikes of the series' signature drumbeat composed by Barry Gray. This sequence is intended to demonstrate Scarlet's indestructibility, the bullets from the assassin's machine gun having no effect on the captain. The sequence is accompanied by a voiceover from Ed Bishop stating:

"The Mysterons: sworn enemies of Earth. Possessing the ability to recreate an exact likeness of an object or person. But first, they must destroy... Leading the fight, one man fate has made indestructible. His name: Captain Scarlet."

A number of variations have been used. In the first episode, the voiceover runs:

"The finger is on the trigger. About to unleash a force with terrible powers, beyond the comprehension of man. This force we shall know as the Mysterons. This man will be our hero, for fate will make him indestructible. His name: Captain Scarlet."

Spectrum's logo, which appears at the start and end of each episode's advert break

An alternative version, rarely used, runs: "One man. A man who is different. Chosen by fate. Caught up in Earth's unwanted conflict with the Mysterons. Determined. Courageous. Indestructible. His name: Captain Scarlet." Later prints feature an additional voiceover by Donald Gray, warning the audience: "Captain Scarlet is indestructible. You are not. Remember this. Do not try to imitate him." This served to establish the background to the series and warn younger viewers not to put themselves at risk by copying Scarlet's actions. It was used either on its own or following the "One man ..." voiceover.

From the second episode, "Winged Assassin", the opening scenes are followed by a secondary title sequence introducing Captain Blue, Colonel White, the Angels and Captain Black. As the Mysterons announce their latest threat against Earth, the Mysteron rings pass over the characters in various environments, demonstrating the aliens' omnipresence. At the same time, the characters' codenames are flashed on-screen. The Mysterons invariably begin their threats with the words: "This is the voice of the Mysterons. We know that you can hear us, Earthmen."

The closing titles were originally intended to show images of printed circuit boards and other electronic components to reflect the early concept of Scarlet being a "mechanical man". In the completed sequence, these are replaced with paintings depicting Scarlet in various moments of peril. The paintings were created by comics artist Ron Embleton, who would later illustrate the adult comic strips Oh, Wicked Wanda! and Sweet Chastity for Penthouse. In 2005, the Animation Art Gallery in London released limited-edition prints of the paintings signed by Francis Matthews.

In Japan, the original opening titles were replaced with a montage of action clips from various episodes accompanied by an upbeat song performed by children. This version is included in the special features of the Captain Scarlet DVD box set.

=== Filming ===
The first episode, "The Mysterons", began filming on 2 January 1967 after two months' pre-production. The budget for the series was set at £1.5 million (about £24 million in 2025). At an average cost of £46,000 per episode, or £2,000 per minute, it was the most expensive Anderson production to date. The previous month, APF had been renamed "Century 21 Productions".

By the time Captain Scarlet entered production, many of the directors on earlier Anderson series—including Alan Pattillo, David Elliott and David Lane—had either left the company or were committed to Thunderbird 6. Although Lane, Brian Burgess and Desmond Saunders reprised directorial duties for at least one episode each, the Andersons were forced to promote some of the junior production personnel to replace the outgoing directors. Among these were camera operator Alan Perry and art assistant Ken Turner. Other directors were recruited from outside the company; one of them was Robert Lynn, who had been an assistant director on feature films. After directing the first episode himself, Saunders stayed with the production as its "supervising director" to guide the new recruits.

Captain Scarlet was filmed in a set of converted factory units on the Slough Trading Estate, (Note: Slough Trading Estate: 51°31′28″N 0°37′30″W (filming and editing)) which had served as Century 21's studios since the making of Stingray in 1964. Continuing a practice begun on earlier series, episodes were filmed in pairs on separate stages to speed up production. Filming overlapped with the Thunderbird 6 shoot, which was being conducted on a different stage. Production design duties were split between Keith Wilson and John Lageu, the latter being responsible for the technical elements of the sets. The Mysteron rings were created by panning a transparency of two green circles using a slide projector, a technique suggested by producer Reg Hill.

When the series started airing in September 1967, principal photography had been completed on the first 20 episodes. The puppet footage for each episode usually took two weeks, or 11 working days, to shoot. Although filming of the series was scheduled to take eight months, the demands of the Thunderbird 6 shoot caused it to overrun, finally concluding in November 1967.

=== Music ===
Notation of the Spectrum leitmotif, associated with Cloudbase and the organisation in general

Top: the four-note motif used to convey the presence of the Mysterons. Scarlet's variation (bottom) emphasises the character's Mysteron past.

The music for Captain Scarlet was composed by Barry Gray, who had scored all prior Supermarionation series. The opening theme—"The Mysterons"—was produced electronically and accompanied by a seven-note staccato drumbeat introducing Scarlet. Gerry Anderson, who had intended this to be more like a traditional fanfare, said of his initial response: "I thought, 'Christ, is this all he could produce?' Looking back on it, however, I can see that what he came up with worked very well." The drumbeat had two other functions: to cut from one scene to another, with the shot alternating between the previous scene and the next in time with each beat; and to cut into and out of each episode's midpoint advert break, where it was accompanied by a zooming image of the Spectrum logo.

Two versions of the ending theme—"Captain Scarlet"—were recorded. The first version, used on the first 14 episodes, is entirely instrumental except for the lyrics "Captain Scarlet!", repeated at intervals by a vocalist ensemble including Ken Barrie. Each instance is followed by a vocoded repetition supplied by Gray himself, the final two forming a ternary with the word "Indestructible!". The instrumental was later reworked as a song with lyrics performed by The Spectrum, a London boy band who shared their name with the fictional organisation. Formed in 1960 and signed to RCA Victor, the group were being promoted as a British imitation of The Monkees. They were brought to the Andersons' attention by Gerry's chauffeur, who had heard them on the radio, and signed a contract with Century 21 worth £100,000. At their early concerts in 1977, Siouxsie and the Banshees performed a spoof of the ending theme with extra lyrics mocking Scarlet.

Between March and December 1967, Gray also recorded incidental music for 18 episodes. The remaining 14 re-used these scores, supplemented by cues produced for earlier Anderson series. Compared to Thunderbirds, the incidental music for Captain Scarlet was recorded with smaller ensembles: no episode features more than 16 instruments.

In their notes on the CD release, Ralph Titterton and Tim Mallett write that the Captain Scarlet soundtrack has a "military feel" that favours percussion, brass and wind instruments, in contrast with the full orchestral sound of Thunderbirds. Gray preferred traditional instruments for much of the action, limiting electronic music to scenes set in outer space and an echoing four-note motif that serves to identify the Mysterons. Scarlet's motif, featured in incidental music as well as both versions of the ending theme, is a variation emphasising the captain's nature as an ex-Mysteron. Gray performed some of the series' electronic music himself.

==== Commercial releases ====
In 1967, Century 21 Records released an extended play titled TV Themes from Captain Scarlet, which included commercial re-recordings of the series' opening and closing themes. The soundtrack has since had two CD releases: the first by Silva Screen Records; the second by Fanderson, the official Gerry Anderson fan club. Fanderson's version was available exclusively to club members and contained music from every episode except "The Heart of New York" and "Treble Cross" (which contain no original music) and "Traitor" (whose cue recordings are lost). The tracks from each release are listed below.

===== Silva Screen release (2003) =====
Captain Scarlet (Original Television Soundtrack)

Soundtrack album
- Released: 17 November 2003 (UK); 9 December 2003 (US)
- Length: 78:57
- Label: Silva Screen Records

Professional ratings
Review scores
Source	Rating
AllMusic	4/5 stars

Track list
No.	Title	Notes	Length
1.	"Century 21 Sting"		0:10
2.	"Opening Titles (Pilot Narration)"		0:48
3.	"End Titles (Semi-Vocal Version)"		1:23
4.	"Winged Assassin: Suite"	From "Winged Assassin"	4:38
5.	"Staccato Beat"		0:04
6.	"Big Ben Strikes Again"	From "Big Ben Strikes Again"	1:33
7.	"Big Ben Strikes Again: Until Midnight (Radio Music)"	From "Big Ben Strikes Again"	2:22
8.	"Avalanche: Mountain Pass"	From "Avalanche"	1:12
9.	"Avalanche: Deadly Mist and Mountain Chase"	From "Avalanche"	4:24
10.	"White as Snow (Episode Version)"	From "White as Snow"	3:26
11.	"Manhunt: Suite"	From "Manhunt"	4:07
12.	"Model Spy: Models on a Train"	From "Model Spy"	2:32
13.	"Model Spy: Cocktail Music"	From "Model Spy"	3:28
14.	"Lunarville 7: Suite"	From "Lunarville 7"	4:52
15.	"Point 783: The SHEF March"	From "Point 783"	2:35
16.	"Expo 2068: The Reactor"	From "Expo 2068"	2:33
17.	"Commercial Stings and Commercial Break"		1:04
18.	"Fire at Rig 15: Rig 15"	From "Fire at Rig 15"	2:49
19.	"The Inquisition: Piano Track"	From "The Inquisition"	3:23
20.	"The Trap: The Fate of the XQR"	From "The Trap"	1:31
21.	"The Trap: Castle Glen Garry"	From "The Trap"	4:51
22.	"Attack on Cloudbase: Desert Symphony"	From "Attack on Cloudbase"	5:14
23.	"Attack on Cloudbase: The Mysterons Attack!"	From "Attack on Cloudbase"	3:13
24.	"Spectrum Strikes Back: Suite"	From "Spectrum Strikes Back"	8:30
25.	"End Titles (Song Version)"		1:28
26.	"Main Titles (with Generic Opening Narration)"		0:48
27.	"White as Snow (Commercial Version)"	Stereo	3:12
28.	"Captain Scarlet Theme (Commercial Version)"	Stereo	2:47

Reviewing the Silva Screen release, Bruce Eder of AllMusic describes the collection of theme and incidental music as "a strange mix of otherworldly 'music of the spheres', late–50s/early–60s 'space age pop', 'British Invasion' beat, Scottish folk-inspired tunes, kids-style 'Mickey Mouse' scoring, martial music, light jazz, and light classical". He singles out the two versions of "White as Snow" from the episode of the same name, "Cocktail Music" from the episode "Model Spy" and a piano piece from "The Inquisition" (which Gray performed himself) for special praise. In his BBC Online review, Peter Marsh suggests that the grimness of the music reflects the series' use of realistic puppets and its presentation of death, as well as its alien villains and lack of humour. He comments that "dissonant vibraphone chords shimmer under hovering, tremulous strings contrasted with urgent, militaristic drums and pulsing brass—driving the action ever onto its climax (and, no doubt, a big explosion)."

===== Fanderson release (three discs, 2015) =====
Captain Scarlet and the Mysterons

Soundtrack album
- Released: 8 October 2015
- Label: Fanderson
- Producers: Tim Mallett; Kindred Productions

Disc 1
No.	Title	Notes	Length
1.	"Century 21 Television Logo"		0:10
2.	"Captain Scarlet Main Titles – 'The Mysterons' Version"	Exclusive to the first episode	0:51
3.	"The Voice of The Mysterons"	From "The Mysterons"	5:49
4.	"Trapped in The Sky Park"	From "The Mysterons"	2:25
5.	"The Flight of Delta Tango"	From "Winged Assassin"	3:13
6.	"Mysteron Booby Trap"	From "Winged Assassin"	3:04
7.	"Atomic Runaway" (featuring "Until Midnight")	From "Big Ben Strikes Again"	6:03
8.	"Nuclear Countdown"	From "Big Ben Strikes Again"	4:25
9.	"Welcome to Point 783"	From "Point 783"	5:09
10.	"Attack of the Unitron"	From "Point 783"	2:05
11.	"VTOL Jazz"	From "The Launching"	0:37
12.	"Nightmare at 20,000 Feet"	From "The Launching"	0:46
13.	"Dockside Celebration"	From "The Launching"	1:36
14.	"The Manhunt for Captain Black"	From "Manhunt"	4:04
15.	"Radioactive Angel"	From "Manhunt"	3:47
16.	"Time to Die"	From "Operation Time"	4:38
17.	"Killing Time"	From "Operation Time"	3:24
18.	"Ivory Lounge"	From "Special Assignment"	1:01
19.	"Blue's Blues"	From "Special Assignment"	1:36
20.	"Rien Ne Va Plus"	From "Special Assignment"	0:52
21.	"The Mystery of Glengarry Castle"	From "The Trap"	5:29
22.	"Sitting Targets"	From "The Trap"	4:50
23.	"Captain Scarlet End Titles – Original Version"		1:22
24.	"Captain Scarlet Main Titles – Music and Effects Version"		0:45
25.	"The Voice of the Mysterons – Alternate Score"		6:03
26.	"Captain Scarlet Commercial Break Sting"		0:05
27.	"Trapped in The Sky Park – Alternate Score"		3:58
28.	"Captain Scarlet End Titles – Original Version (Instrumental)"		1:24

Disc 2
No.	Title	Notes	Length
1.	"Century 21 Television Logo"		0:10
2.	"Captain Scarlet Main Titles"	Standard version	0:51
3.	"A New Man"	From "Renegade Rocket"	4:14
4.	"Destruct Code Amen"	From "Renegade Rocket"	2:24
5.	"Collision Course"	From "White as Snow"	7:39
6.	"Target: Snow"	From "White as Snow"	2:57
7.	"An Angel in Paris"	From "Seek and Destroy"	3:59
8.	"Assignment in Africa"	From "Spectrum Strikes Back"	7:19
9.	"Chasing Indigo"	From "Spectrum Strikes Back"	5:45
10.	"Culture Shock"	From "Place of Angels"	4:13
11.	"Death on the Line"	From "Avalanche"	5:33
12.	"Race to Big Bear"	From "Avalanche"	0:43
13.	"Phase Two"	From "Shadow of Fear"	7:59
14.	"Countdown to Destruction"	From "Shadow of Fear"	3:31
15.	"Slayed in Flames"	From "Fire at Rig 15"	4:53
16.	"Pipeline Pursuit"	From "Fire at Rig 15"	4:55
17.	"Road to Nowhere"	From "Expo 2068"	2:28
18.	"Temperature Rising"	From "Expo 2068"	0:44
19.	"Captain Scarlet"	Performed by The Spectrum	1:26
20.	"Atomic Runaway – Stereo Mix"	From "Big Ben Strikes Again"	1:33
21.	"White as Snow (Stereo)"	Also released as a 7-inch single	1:55
22.	"The Mysterons Theme"	Also released as a 7-inch single	2:16
23.	"Captain Scarlet"	Also released as a 7-inch single	1:36

Disc 3
No.	Title	Notes	Length
1.	"Century 21 Television Logo"		0:10
2.	"Captain Scarlet Main Titles (Music Only)"		0:37
3.	"Mission to the Moon"	From "Lunarville 7"	4:09
4.	"Secret of the Far Side"	From "Lunarville 7"	5:07
5.	"Catwalk Angels"	From "Model Spy"	5:15
6.	"Cocktails and Kidnap"	From "Model Spy"	3:14
7.	"The Hand of Friendship"	From "Dangerous Rendezvous"	3:15
8.	"The Specialist"	From "Codename Europa"	2:36
9.	"Journey to the Far Side of the Moon"	From "Crater 101"	3:13
10.	"Into the Complex"	From "Crater 101"	3:43
11.	"Airport 2068"	From "Flight 104"	4:59
12.	"One of Our Aircraft is Empty"	From "Flight 104"	0:50
13.	"Cold Mine"	From "Noose of Ice"	0:45
14.	"Deep Freeze"	From "Noose of Ice"	2:23
15.	"Flying High"	From "Flight to Atlantica"	4:51
16.	"Fallen Angel"	From "Attack on Cloudbase"	5:08
17.	"Cloudbase Down"	From "Attack on Cloudbase"	4:33
18.	"Black Coffee"	From "The Inquisition"	3:21
19.	"Temple of The Sun God"	From "Inferno"	5:05
20.	"Valley of Fire"	From "Inferno"	2:38
21.	"Captain Scarlet – Instrumental"	Performed by The Spectrum	1:19
22.	"Mysteron Threat"	From "Manhunt"	0:53
23.	"Black Coffee – Short Version"	From "The Inquisition"	1:50
24.	"Desert Symphony (Stereo)"	From "Attack on Cloudbase"	5:13
25.	"The Mysterons Attack (Stereo)"	From "Attack on Cloudbase"	3:12

== Release ==
=== Broadcast history ===
Captain Scarlet had its official UK premiere on 29 September 1967 on the ATV Midlands franchise of the ITV network. The first episode was seen by an estimated 450,000 viewers, a figure considered promising. Exactly five months earlier, this episode had been broadcast in the London area as an unscheduled late-night test transmission. The series officially debuted in London and Scotland on 1 October, with the Granada, Anglia, Channel, Southern and Westward franchises following later that month. By the end of 1967, 4.95 million UK households—equivalent to 10.9 million people—were watching the series. In the Midlands, viewing figures had risen to 1.1 million halfway through the run.

By the start of 1968, Captain Scarlet was being broadcast in all parts of the UK. The series would go on to be shown in more than 40 other countries, including Canada, Australia, New Zealand and Japan. In the United States, it aired in first-run syndication. Only six episodes were shown in the Netherlands.

UK re-runs varied by franchise. Granada, Harlech and Tyne Tees Television repeated the series until 1972, while in the Midlands, it aired four times in colour between 1969 and 1974. By contrast, Yorkshire Television did not run it again until the 1980s, by which time various ITV franchises were still repeating the series on Saturday and Sunday mornings. The series was later shown in segmented form on Night Network.

Captain Scarlet was subsequently acquired by the BBC, which on 1 October 1993 began the series' first networked (UK-wide) run on BBC2. The first episode achieved viewing figures of four million, the channel's third-largest audience that week. Around that same time, the show also aired in the United States on the Sci-Fi Channel as part of their morning animation block, in Canada on YTV, and in Australia along with other Supermarionation shows on Nickelodeon's Nick at Nite block. In September 2001, the BBC began repeating the series in digitally-remastered form. Following the September 11 attacks, the episode order was changed: "Winged Assassin" (in which the Mysterons destroy an airliner) and "Big Ben Strikes Again" (in which they hi-jack a nuclear device), were postponed due to perceived similarities between the plots and real-world events. These episodes were eventually broadcast in November and December 2001.

In June 2024, UK channel Talking Pictures TV started a repeat run on Saturday afternoons. The same month, MeTV Toons in the US began airing various Anderson series, including Captain Scarlet.

=== Home video ===
The series' first VHS release in the UK was by Precision Video in 1982. Precision was later acquired by Channel 5 Video (a partnership of PolyGram and Heron International), which issued further Captain Scarlet volumes during the 1980s. Between 2001 and 2002, Carlton Video re-released the series both in volumes and as a box set. These featured the remastered picture and sound quality that had been introduced for the 2000s repeats. The box set included an extra tape containing a behind-the-scenes feature, Captain Scarlet: The Indestructible.

Since September 2001, Captain Scarlet has also been available on Region 2 DVD in both its original mono soundtrack and new Dolby Digital surround sound. Bonus features include audio commentaries by Gerry Anderson on two episodes, "The Mysterons" and "Attack on Cloudbase". As with the VHS versions, the DVDs have also been released as a box set; this includes an extra disc featuring a production documentary, Captain Scarlet S.I.G., along with a set of five alternative title sequences. A Region 1 box set by A&E Home Video was released in 2002. In 2004, Imavision released a French-language box set for the Canadian market.

In 2017, the series' 50th anniversary year, UK company Network Distributing announced that it was releasing Captain Scarlet on Blu-ray with all episodes remastered in high definition using the original 35 mm film negatives. The Blu-rays were released between 2017 and 2018, both in volumes and as a box set.

==== Remastered VHS releases by Carlton ====
Title	Episodes	Released
Captain Scarlet and the Mysterons: Complete Series Box Set	All episodes (also includes Captain Scarlet: The Indestructible behind-the-scenes feature)	17 September 2001
Captain Scarlet: The Indestructible	—N/a	17 September 2001
Captain Scarlet and the Mysterons: Volume 1	"The Mysterons", "Winged Assassin", "Big Ben Strikes Again", "Manhunt"	17 September 2001
Captain Scarlet and the Mysterons: Volume 2	"Avalanche", "White as Snow", "The Trap", "Operation Time"	17 September 2001
Captain Scarlet and the Mysterons: Volume 3	"Spectrum Strikes Back", "Special Assignment", "The Heart of New York", "Lunarville 7"	12 November 2001
Captain Scarlet and the Mysterons: Volume 4	"Point 783", "Model Spy", "Seek and Destroy", "Traitor"	12 November 2001
Captain Scarlet and the Mysterons: Volume 5	"Renegade Rocket", "Crater 101", "Shadow of Fear", "Dangerous Rendezvous"	28 January 2002
Captain Scarlet and the Mysterons: Volume 6	"Fire at Rig 15", "Treble Cross", "Flight 104", "Place of Angels"	28 January 2002
Captain Scarlet and the Mysterons: Volume 7	"Noose of Ice", "Expo 2068", "The Launching", "Codename Europa"	18 March 2002
Captain Scarlet and the Mysterons: Volume 8	"Inferno", "Flight to Atlantica", "Attack on Cloudbase", "The Inquisition"	18 March 2002

==== DVD first releases by Carlton ====
Title	Episodes	First released
Captain Scarlet and the Mysterons: Complete Series Box Set	All episodes (also includes Captain Scarlet S.I.G. documentary)	17 September 2001
Captain Scarlet and the Mysterons: Volume 1	"The Mysterons", "Winged Assassin", "Big Ben Strikes Again", "Manhunt", "Avalanche", "White as Snow"	17 September 2001
Captain Scarlet and the Mysterons: Volume 2	"The Trap", "Operation Time", "Spectrum Strikes Back", "Special Assignment", "The Heart of New York", "Lunarville 7"	17 September 2001
Captain Scarlet and the Mysterons: Volume 3	"Point 783", "Model Spy", "Seek and Destroy", "Traitor", "Renegade Rocket", "Crater 101"	12 November 2001
Captain Scarlet and the Mysterons: Volume 4	"Shadow of Fear", "Dangerous Rendezvous", "Fire at Rig 15", "Treble Cross", "Flight 104", "Place of Angels"	12 November 2001
Captain Scarlet and the Mysterons: Volume 5	"Noose of Ice", "Expo 2068", "The Launching", "Codename Europa", "Inferno", "Flight to Atlantica", "Attack on Cloudbase", "The Inquisition"	12 November 2001
Joe 90 / Captain Scarlet / Stingray Box Set	"The Mysterons", "Winged Assassin", "Big Ben Strikes Again", "Manhunt", "Avalanche", "White as Snow"	20 October 2003

==== Blu-ray releases by Network Distributing ====
Title	Episodes	Released
"Supermarionation" Box Set	"The Mysterons", "Winged Assassin", "Treble Cross" and "Noose of Ice" (plus episodes of other Supermarionation series)	20 October 2014
Captain Scarlet and the Mysterons: Volume 1	"The Mysterons", "Winged Assassin", "Big Ben Strikes Again", "Point 783", "Manhunt", "Operation Time", "Renegade Rocket", "White as Snow"	20 November 2017
Captain Scarlet and the Mysterons: Volume 2	"Seek and Destroy", "Spectrum Strikes Back", "Avalanche", "Shadow of Fear", "The Heart of New York", "Fire at Rig 15", "The Launching", "Lunarville 7"	29 January 2018
Captain Scarlet and the Mysterons: Volume 3	"The Trap", "Model Spy", "Crater 101", "Dangerous Rendezvous", "Special Assignment", "Traitor", "Place of Angels", "Flight 104"	12 March 2018
Captain Scarlet and the Mysterons: Volume 4	"Codename Europa", "Flight to Atlantica", "Noose of Ice", "Treble Cross", "Expo 2068", "Inferno", "Attack on Cloudbase", "The Inquisition"	30 July 2018
Captain Scarlet and the Mysterons: Deluxe Volume 4	"Codename Europa", "Flight to Atlantica", "Noose of Ice", "Treble Cross", "Expo 2068", "Inferno", "Attack on Cloudbase", "The Inquisition" (with additional documentaries compared to standard Volume 4)	30 July 2018
Captain Scarlet and the Mysterons: The Complete Series	All episodes	8 October 2018

== Reception ==
Captain Scarlet and the Mysterons should have been one of the most successful puppet shows and it wasn't. I think it was too perfect. There was a lack of humour. It was too mechanical and needed humanising.

— Sylvia Anderson on the series

Given Grade's surprise cancellation of Thunderbirds, Gerry Anderson had little hope of Captain Scarlet running for more than one series. According to Anderson: "I didn't expect it to continue. I simply went to Lew and asked, 'What's the next thing you want us to do?'"

Captain Scarlet is widely regarded as "darker" or more "mature" in tone than earlier Supermarionation productions. According to Andrew Billen: "Whereas Thunderbirds was about rescuing people, Scarlet was about damnation, the soul of a resurrected man being fought for between Captain Scarlet and the equally indestructible Captain Black. It was Anderson's Gothic period." Marcus Hearn comments that the series has a "militaristic" feel, with less emphasis on "characterisation and charm" than before. For Jim Sangster and Paul Condon, the optimism of Stingray and Thunderbirds is noticeably absent, with heroism and unqualified victories replaced by desperate games of "damage limitation" as Scarlet and Spectrum rush to counter every Mysteron move, sometimes unsuccessfully. The series' presentation of death and destruction has prompted questions about its suitability for younger viewers: media historian Daniel O'Brien notes that Captain Scarlet is "rated by some as the most violently destructive children's show ever". The horror of the Mysterons has been recognised: in 2003, the aliens' depiction was ranked 82nd in the Channel 4 list show 100 Greatest Scary Moments.

Commentators have drawn parallels between Captain Scarlet and the state of international relations in the 1960s. According to Robert Sellers, the series arose from contemporary "sci-fi obsession with alien forces infiltrating society", influenced by fears about the Cold War and communism. Nicholas J. Cull writes that the "war of nerves" between Earth and Mars echoed real-world geopolitical conflict, while the "enemy within" scenario of Martians taking over humans was derived from films like Invasion of the Body Snatchers (1956). Mark Bould argues that the series "seemed in tune with a decade of civil disobedience and anti-imperialist guerrilla wars"—a view echoed by Rebecca Feasey of the University of Edinburgh, who regards it as one of several that "exploited the fears of 1960s America" through its portrayal of "civil disobedience and the potentially negative impact of new technologies". Since 2001, comparisons have been made to the September 11 attacks and war on terror. Sangster and Condon state that for the 1960s, Captain Scarlet was "incredibly perceptive" in its portrayal of the Mysterons, whose tactics they liken to terrorism.

To others, Captain Scarlet remains a "camp classic". According to Bould, it is one of several Anderson productions that depict a "utopian future benefiting from world government, high technology, ethnic diversity, and a generally positive sense of Americanisation. They articulate the commonly made connection between technological developments and economic prosperity." He adds that the series espouses "Euro-cool consumerism". The concept of a world government, a recurring concept in Supermarionation productions, was influenced by Anderson: "I had all sorts of fancy ideas about the future ... we had the United Nations and I imagined that the world would come together and there would be a world government." On the depiction of technology, Peter Wright notes the "qualified technophilia" that Captain Scarlet shares with Thunderbirds.

The series has been criticised for its "static" camerawork, the puppets' limited mobility making dynamic shots a rarity. Criticism has also been directed at the characterisation and writing. Sangster and Condon regard the plots as straightforward and the characters perhaps "even more simplistic" than those of Stingray. Some have blamed the return to 25-minute episodes, coming after Thunderbirds' 50-minute format, for a lack of subplots and perceived drop in the quality of the storytelling. In a 1986 interview, script editor Tony Barwick described Captain Scarlet as "hard-nosed stuff" that lacked humour, adding: "It was all for the American market and to that extent there was no deep characterisation. [The characters] all balanced one against the other." Sylvia Anderson likened the presentation to that of a "comic strip", arguing that the action format came at the expense of the character development. In contrast, Jeff Evans considers the characters "more detailed" than before, arguing that Captain Scarlet was the first Anderson production to give them "private lives and real identities". Paul Cornell, Martin Day and Keith Topping praise the writing, judging it "neither as silly as previous Anderson efforts, nor as po-faced as later ones".

While it would become a huge success, Captain Scarlet received a less than enthusiastic reception from critics. It caused a stir among parents, who condemned the show for its realistic carnage, and (some) children who were bemused by its gritty realism.

— Chris Drake and Graeme Bassett (1993)

Comparing it to Thunderbirds, John Peel summarises Captain Scarlet as "better puppets, bigger action and a huge step backwards in stories", arguing that the superior special effects were to the detriment of the writing. He compares this to the relative failure of Indiana Jones and the Temple of Doom following the success of Raiders of the Lost Ark: "[Gerry] Anderson made the same mistake that George Lucas made, assuming that if the effects were praised in Thunderbirds, the public wanted a show with more effects." Peel also finds fault with Scarlet himself, arguing that an "indestructible" hero who risks his safety to thwart enemies was a poor role model for impressionable children and made the episode endings predictable. Sangster and Condon give a similar assessment, commenting that Scarlet's abilities weaken the suspense and make him "a difficult hero to believe in".

Considered a cult classic by some, Captain Scarlet came 33rd in a 2007 Radio Times poll for best science fiction series of all time. It was ranked 51st in Channel 4's list show 100 Greatest Kids' TV Shows (2001). Cornell, Day and Topping suggest that the series could be Gerry Anderson's best production. Anderson's own verdict was downbeat: "Nothing was as successful as Thunderbirds. Captain Scarlet and the Mysterons was very successful, but once you've had a smash hit, everything tends to look less successful in comparison."

=== Race, gender and symbolism ===
When I made Supercar for ATV, we put a number of black characters in an episode because the story demanded it. ATV had an American advisor at the time, and he made us take out every black character and replace them with white characters and white voices. He said he would not be able to sell it to stations in the South ... I was always very anxious to promote racial harmony, so as soon as people had become more sensible I took advantage of it.

— Gerry Anderson on racial diversity

Captain Scarlet has received comment both positive and negative for its use of female and ethnic minority characters. This is an aspect which, according to O'Brien, gives the series a "more cosmopolitan" feel than Thunderbirds. Around the time of the 1993 repeats on BBC2, the series drew criticism for its use of the codenames "Black" and "White" in reference to the benevolent Colonel White and the villainous Captain Black, which some commentators interpreted as a form of negative black-and-white dualism. Rejecting claims of racist stereotyping, Anderson pointed out that the series features heroic non-whites in the form of Lieutenant Green, Melody Angel and Harmony Angel. Green is the only black male regular character in any of the Supermarionation series.

For Sellers, the inclusion of Green and especially Melody Angel, a black female character, shows that Captain Scarlet was "actually ahead of its time in respect to race relations". He regards the Angels' all-female composition as significant from the perspective of women's emancipation. O'Brien is less complimentary on the Angels, arguing that while they were progressive for the 1960s, to newer audiences they come across as a "conventionally sexist male fantasy".

The characters' diversity in terms of race and gender has been highly regarded in academic publications. Bould praises the "beautiful, multiethnic, female Angel fighter pilots" and "secondary roles played by capable women". In a 2003 interview, Anderson noted the efforts made to feature minorities: "... I think people who make television programmes have a responsibility, particularly when children are watching avidly and you know their minds can be affected almost irreversibly as they grow up. We were very conscious of introducing different ethnic backgrounds."

Cy Grant, the voice of Green, believed that Captain Scarlet had both positive multicultural value and an allegorical nature. He argued that religious symbolism was implied, with Colonel White serving as an analogue for God, Captain Black as the Devil and Scarlet as the Son of God. The allegory extended to Cloudbase, which represented Heaven and was guarded by a fleet of fighters called "Angels". On dualism, he wrote: "The 'darkness' of the Mysterons is most easily seen as the psychological rift—the struggle of 'good' and 'evil'—of the Western world as personified by Colonel White and his team. Dark and light are but aspects of each other. Incidentally, green is the colour of nature that can heal that rift."

== Other media ==
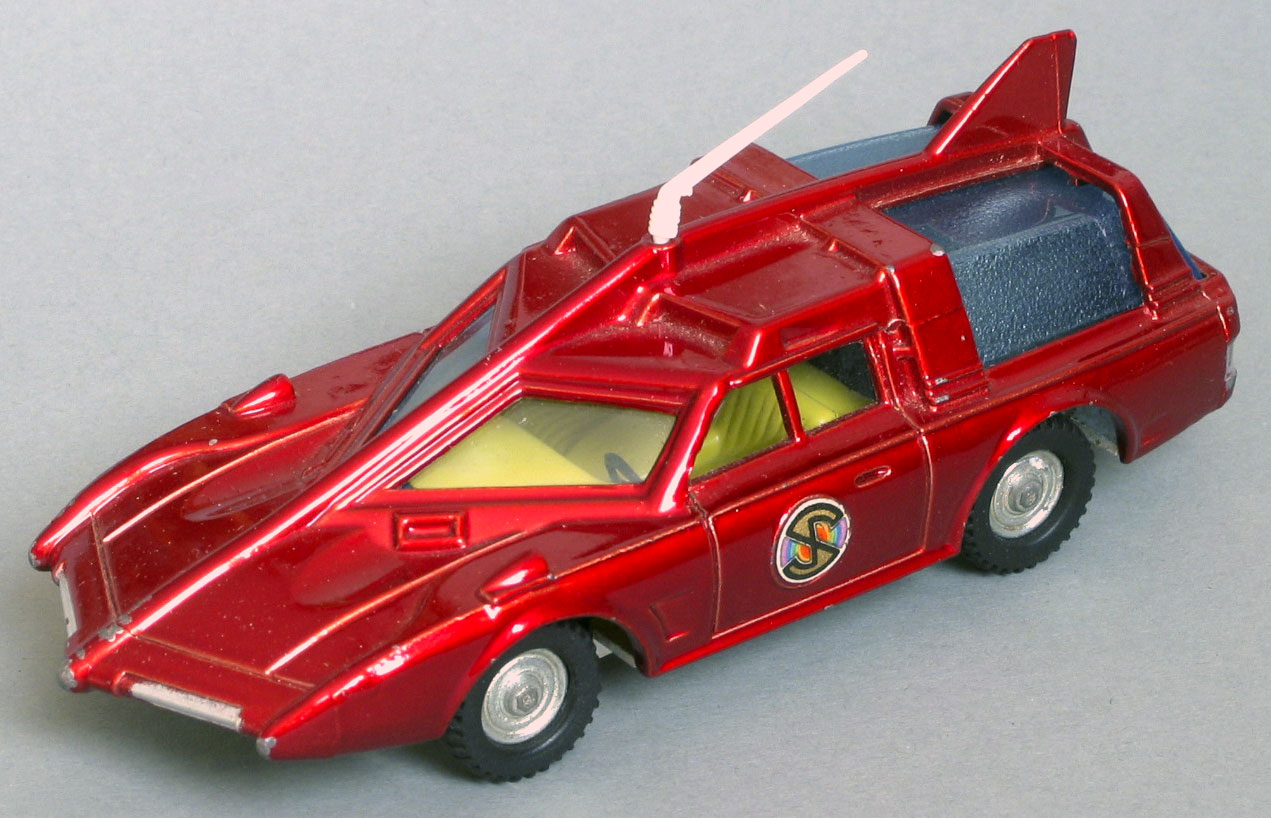
Spectrum Patrol Car by Dinky Toys

The ATV game show The Golden Shot, hosted by Bob Monkhouse, used Captain Scarlet as the theme for its 1967 Christmas special. Broadcast live on 23 December, the programme featured guest appearances from Francis Matthews and The Spectrum.

Since its first run, the series has been supplemented by merchandise ranging from toy action figures to video games. Among the early tie-ins were a series of five audio plays published by Century 21 Records in 1967. Released on EP record, each play was approximately 21 minutes long and featured the voice cast from the TV series. Angus P. Allan wrote the first play, Introducing Captain Scarlet (set during the denouement of the first TV episode) as well as Captain Scarlet and the Mysterons and Captain Scarlet of Spectrum. The other two—Captain Scarlet is Indestructible and Captain Scarlet versus Captain Black—were written by his assistant, Richard O'Neill. To mark Captain Scarlet's 50th anniversary in 2017, Big Finish Productions digitally remastered the plays and re-released them on CD. The seven-disc set also includes audio adaptations of eight of the TV episodes, narrated by Ed Bishop as Captain Blue.

During the 1960s, Century 21 granted more than 60 licences for Captain Scarlet products and released a range of friction-drive model vehicles through its subsidiary Century 21 Toys. Meccano Ltd manufactured Captain Scarlet Dinky Toys to great success: its SPV was its best-selling die-cast toy of all time and continued to be manufactured until 1976. Waddingtons released a Captain Scarlet board game based on snakes and ladders. In 1993, Vivid Imaginations launched a new toy range to coincide with the BBC2 repeats.

=== Books and comics ===
Between 1967 and 1968, Armada Books published three Captain Scarlet children's novels by John William Jennison (who wrote under the pseudonym "John Theydon"): Captain Scarlet and the Mysterons, Captain Scarlet and the Silent Saboteur and The Angels and the Creeping Enemy. As implied by its title, the third novel features the Spectrum Angels as the main characters. In 1993, Young Corgi Books released children's novelisations of "The Mysterons", "Lunarville 7", "Noose of Ice" and "The Launching".

From September 1967, comic strips based on the series were printed in TV Century 21 (later TV21), published by City Magazines in association with Century 21. The comic had already featured Fireball XL5, Stingray and Thunderbirds strips as well as crossovers between the three, indicating that they were set in a shared fictional world of the 2060s. Captain Scarlet was integrated into this setting. Elements of the new series, including Captain Black, had been introduced as early as June 1967. The initial Captain Scarlet strips were drawn by Ron Embleton, who was succeeded first by Mike Noble and then by Jim Watson. Frank Bellamy drew five strips. After the TV series finished its original run, the comic continued the story of Spectrum and the Mysterons, with later adventures showing the Mysterons deactivating their city on Mars and relinquishing their control over Black. Scarlet, meanwhile, leaves Spectrum to combat Earth-bound threats. The Mysterons eventually reawaken, prompting Scarlet and Spectrum to resume their struggle. Captain Scarlet also appeared in TV21 and Century 21 annuals for 1967, 1968 and 1969. In September 1969, it was dropped from TV21.

The series' TV21 debut had been preceded by spin-off adventures in the sister comics Lady Penelope and Solo. In January 1967, Lady Penelope launched a comic strip about the Angel pilots; this introduced no elements of the Spectrum Organisation until August 1967. It eventually ran until May 1968. Solo printed two strips: the first from June to September 1967; the second, following a merger with City's TV Tornado, from September 1967 to February 1968. The first, The Mark of the Mysterons, bore little relation to the series besides featuring the Mysterons as villains; it was set in the 1960s and the presentation was similar to that of The Invaders. The second, simply titled The Mysterons, had the aliens travel to the Andromeda Galaxy on a campaign of conquest.

After the series' discontinuation in Century 21 and City titles, Polystyle Publications printed further strips in Countdown comic and annuals in 1971 and 1972. From 1993 to 1994, Fleetway Editions published a Captain Scarlet comic to coincide with the series' first run on BBC2. New annuals were published by Grandreams in 1993 and 1994 and by Carlton Books in 2001.

In Japan, Weekly Shōnen Sunday serialised a manga adaptation of Captain Scarlet between 1967 and 1968. A separate adaptation was published in Shōnen Book from January to August 1968.

=== Video games ===
Between 2002 and 2006, three Captain Scarlet video games were released. A further game was cancelled.

Title	Platform	Genre	Studio(s)	Notes	UK release date
Captain Scarlet: In the Shadow of Fear	PC	Action	Europress	Released both separately and as a double pack with Thunderbirds: Operation Volcano	31 May 2002
Captain Scarlet Activity Pack	PC	Action	Digital Workshop	—N/a	5 July 2002
Captain Scarlet: Retaliation	PC	Strategy	Batfish Studios; Digital Workshop	Scheduled for 2003; cancelled due to closure of Batfish Studios the same year	Cancelled
Captain Scarlet	PlayStation 2	Vehicular combat	Blast! Entertainment; Brain in a Jar	—N/a	5 December 2006

== Later productions ==
Since the 1980s, the rights to the ITC catalogue have changed hands several times. They were acquired first by PolyGram Entertainment, and then, following a partial sale to the BBC, by Carlton International. Following Carlton's 2004 merger with Granada to form ITV plc, the rights to Captain Scarlet and other Anderson series now reside with ITV Studios.

In the early 1980s, Robert Mandell and ITC New York combined several episodes of Captain Scarlet into two compilation films: Revenge of the Mysterons from Mars and Captain Scarlet vs. the Mysterons. Promoted as "Super Space Theater", these were broadcast on US cable TV in the aim of reviving syndication sales. Other Anderson productions, including Stingray and Thunderbirds, received similar treatments. Released on British VHS in January 1982, Revenge of the Mysterons from Mars was Captain Scarlet's UK home video debut. In November 1988, it aired as the second episode of the movie-mocking series Mystery Science Theater 3000 on Minnesota TV station KTMA.

Plans for a live-action film adaptation, announced by Gerry Anderson in 2000 and 2002, remain undeveloped.

=== Remake ===
In 1999, Anderson supervised the production of a computer-animated test film, Captain Scarlet and the Return of the Mysterons, to explore the possibility of updating some of his 1960s puppet series for a 21st-century audience. Produced by the Moving Picture Company under the working title Captain Scarlet – The New Millennium, the four-minute film was made using a combination of Maya animation software and motion capture technology. Francis Matthews and Ed Bishop reprised the voices of Captains Scarlet and Blue. Set a few years after the Mysterons end hostilities against Earth, the film features the return of Captain Black, setting the stage for a revival of the war with Mars. The film was screened at a Fanderson convention in 2000 and a science lecture in 2001. It was released on Blu-ray in 2017.

Plans for a full computer-animated Captain Scarlet series eventually resulted in New Captain Scarlet. A reboot of the original, this was first broadcast on the ITV children's show Ministry of Mayhem in 2005. In a nod to Supermarionation, the animation used to make the series was promoted as "Hypermarionation". New Captain Scarlet was the last TV series to be produced by Anderson, who died in 2012.
