= Jetex =

Miniature solid-fuel rocket motor

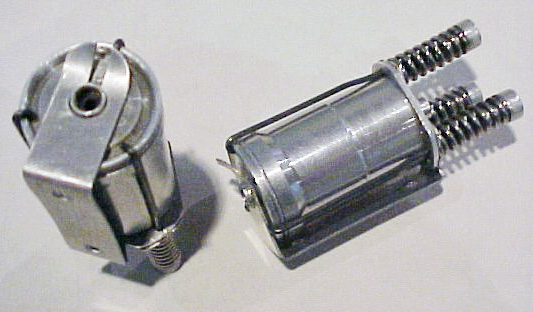
Jetex 100 - the first Jetex motor

Aeromodeller June 1948

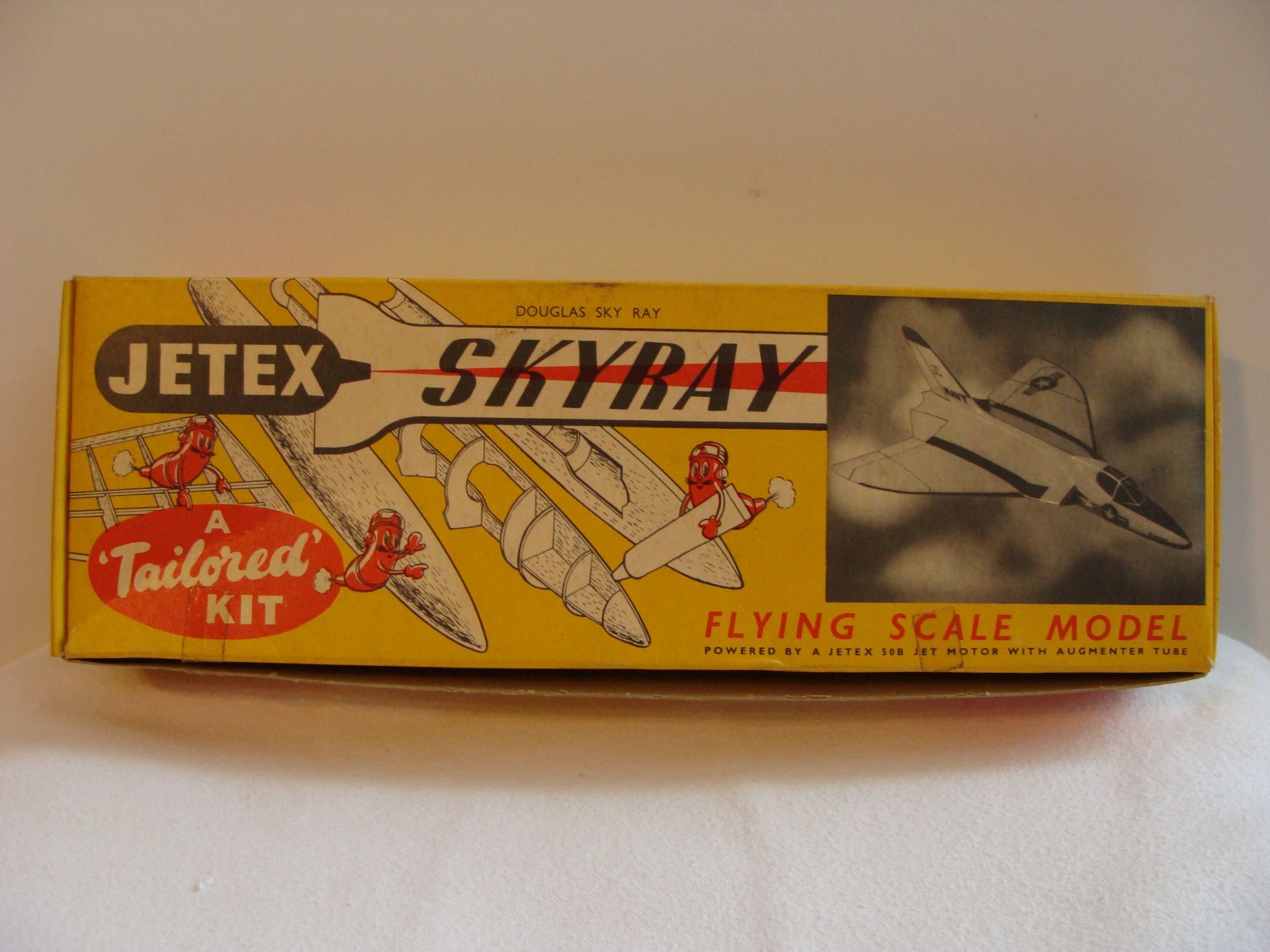
Jetex Tailored Skyray kit

The Jetex motor is a miniature solid-fuel rocket motor produced for use as a powerplant for flying model aircraft. Its production led to a number of imitators and, after its discontinuation, successors of similar type.

== Original Jetex motors ==
Jetex was developed in 1947, by Wilmot, Mansour & Company Ltd of Southampton, which had started operations in a decommissioned hangar at RAF Beaulieu. The first motor was demonstrated in early 1948 and was available to the public in June 1948, when Aeromodeller magazine featured Jetex power on its front cover. The first motors were the Jetex 100 and 200, with the more powerful Jetex 350 following in November 1948. The most popular motor, the Jetex 50, was introduced in May 1949, along with kits for a model plane and model car using Jetex power. The subsequent popularity of Jetex led to the manufacture of numerous kits by third-party companies such as KeilKraft and Skyleada.

Jetex motors are powered by a solid pellet consisting mainly of guanidine nitrate, which burns to release an exhaust gas in large volume, leaving little solid residue. Thrust developed is modest and sustained, making it suitable for aerodynamically lifted flying models. The exhaust gas is not excessively hot, which confers a safety advantage.

Motors are loaded with one or more solid fuel pellets and a combustible 'wick' is led through the exhaust nozzle to ignite the fuel. Fuel and wick were manufactured by Imperial Chemical Industries (ICI). The engine casing of the early motors is made of an aluminium alloy. On introduction, fuel pellets and wick could be purchased separately, meaning that the system is reusable.

Jetex power made a big impact in the late 1940s and early 1950s, allowing new sorts of models, scale and duration, to be designed. During the 1960s, Jetex propellant pellets found another use by AP Films/Century 21, in their 'Supermarionation' TV series, when they were fitted to the undersides of miniature ground vehicles to emit jets of gas resembling dust trails.

Jetex went through a change of ownership in the mid 1950s. Gradually its popularity waned. Ron Baddorf speculated that the development of radio control and the increasing reliability and power of diesel motors caused a lack of interest in "the little Jetex".

== Jetex imitators and successors ==
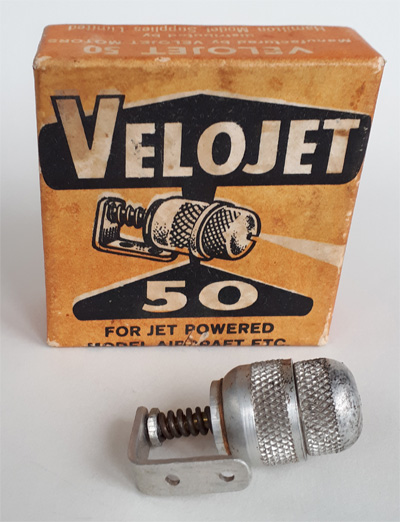
NZ-made Velojet micro-rocket motor

=== Velojet ===
The Velojet 50 and its larger sibling, the Velojet 100, were New Zealand designed and manufactured. They used standard Jetex fuel and had a safety pressure release at the front in the form of a disc against a pre-tensioned coil spring.

=== Jet-X ===
In 1986, Powermax in the UK launched a range of newly formulated size 50 fuel and wick under the Jet-X brand. In the latter half of the 1990s, the company introduced their own 'Z' series motors, corresponding to the original Jetex 35, 50 and 100. From August 1995 Jet-X motors, fuel and fuse were commercially imported into the US. Flying Models told its readers that "safe and viable rocket power for model airplanes is back".

=== Rapier ===
In 1998, a new non-reusable motor, called Rapier, was introduced by a Czech inventor, Dr. Jan Zigmund. It had similar weight, thrust and duration to Jetex, allowing many old plans for Jetex powered models to be built and flown with the new motors. The Rapier was a single use motor with a cardboard case and a ceramic nozzle, visually closer to a model rocket motor than the original reloadable Jetex.

=== Tendera ===
In early 2020, another range of non-reusable motors was introduced by a Polish inventor, Piotr Tendera. These are similar to the Rapiers, being one-time use motors having cardboard cases and ceramic nozzles.

Comparison table
	Jetex Type	Thrust ounces	Tendera/Rapier equivalent	Thrust mN
Jetex	35	0.35	L1	97
Jetex	50	0.50	L2	139
Jetex	200	2.0	L3	556
