= Elizabeth Morgan (actress) =

Welsh actress and writer (born 1930)

- Born: 7 February 1930 (age 96); Llanelli, Wales
- Occupations: Actress, writer
- Years active: 1961–2017

Elizabeth Morgan (born 7 February 1930) is a Welsh actress and writer. Morgan is probably best known for British television roles including voicing Destiny Angel and other characters in the 1967 Gerry Anderson puppet series Captain Scarlet and the Mysterons.

== Life and career ==
Morgan was born on 7 February 1930 in Llanelli. She was a member of the BBC Drama Repertory Company. Early television roles were in the British series Dixon of Dock Green and Softly, Softly.

In 1967, she voiced Destiny Angel in the Gerry Anderson puppet series Captain Scarlet and the Mysterons. During the series run, Morgan also voiced Rhapsody Angel, various guest characters and, for most of the character's appearances, Harmony Angel. In 1968, Morgan returned to Gerry Anderson voicing guest characters in Joe 90.

Morgan appeared in several popular British sitcoms during the 1970s including Dad's Army, Are You Being Served?, The Dick Emery Show and Bless Me, Father.

In 1975, she played Rachel Fisher in Crossroads and appeared in the BBC's 1975 adaptation of Ballet Shoes.

During the 1980s and early 1990s, Morgan appeared in the classic BBC sitcom Terry and June had a recurring role in the sitcom The Two of Us.

In 1993, Morgan provided a voiceover for Ian Sachs' promotional animated film Lenny Goes to the Country for the Royal Mail.

During the 1990s, Morgan appeared in the British sleuth drama Hetty Wainthropp Investigates.

Morgan has written radio plays and appeared in radio shows such as The Big Business Lark and Share and Share Alike. She has also published novels and short stories.

At the 2015 Hay Festival she delivered a lecture on her novel Ticket to Paradise, which is about emigration from Wales to South America during the 19th century.

In 2017, Morgan appeared in various Doctor Who audiobooks, produced by Big Finish Productions.

In 2017, Morgan reprised her role as Destiny Angel for a series of audiobooks to mark the 50th anniversary of Captain Scarlet.

In 2022, now living in Eastbourne, Morgan made newspaper headlines after finding a tooth in her Greggs sausage roll.
