= Gary Files =

Australian-Canadian actor, theatre director and radio writer

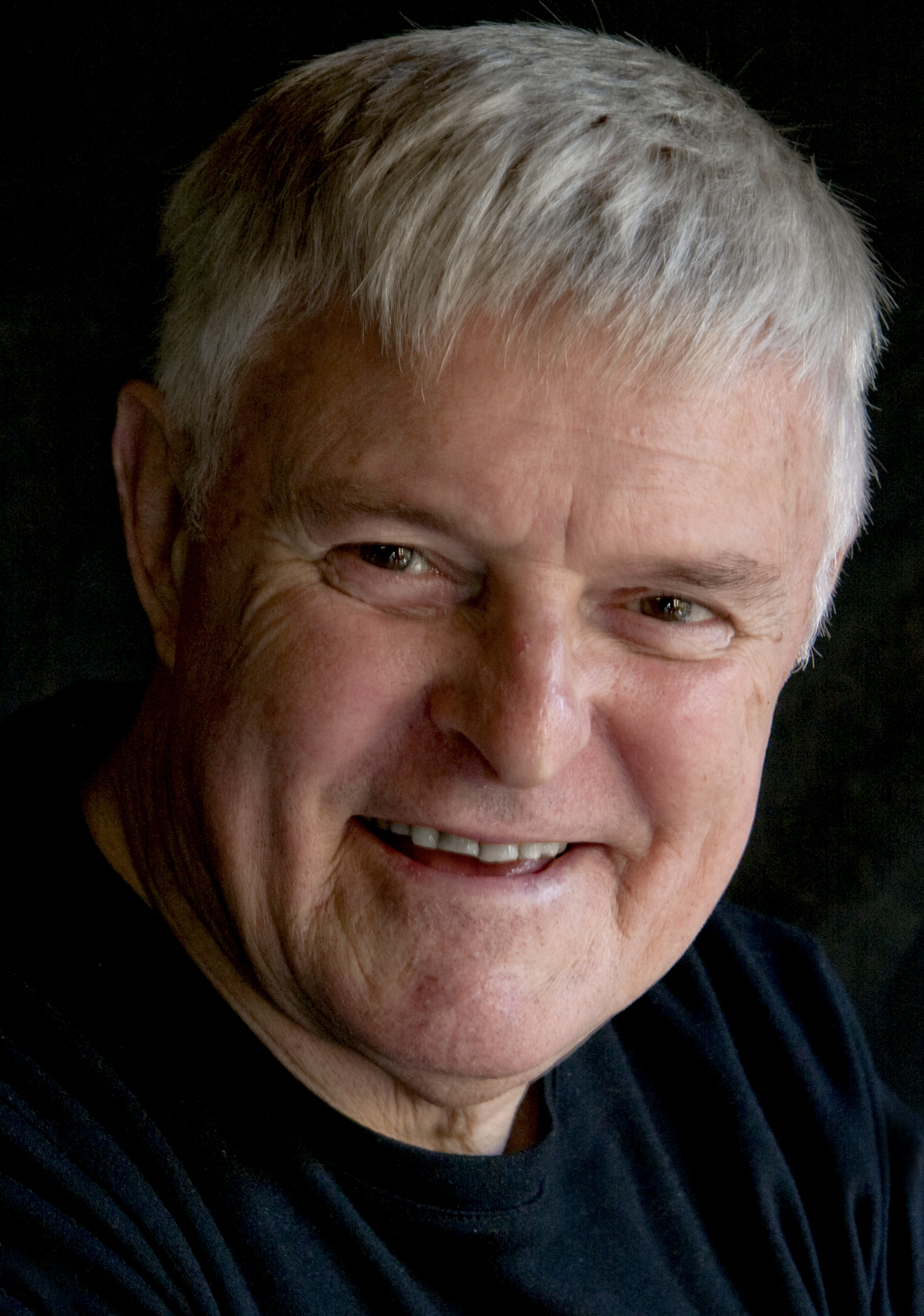
- Born: Melbourne, Victoria, Australia
- Citizenship: Australia; Canada
- Education: National Theatre School of Canada
- Occupations: Actor, theatre director, writer
- Years active: 1956–present
- Organization: Period Pieces Company
- Spouse: Elva Mai Hoover (divorced)
- Children: Gemma Files
- Website: www.garyfiles.com.au

Gary Files is an Australian and Canadian actor, theatre director and radio writer who has worked in Australia, Canada, and the United Kingdom. Resident in Australia since 1976, Files is noted for the accentual versatility of his radio-based voice acting.

== Early life and education ==
Born in Melbourne, Australia, Gary Files started his career in early Australian television and semi-professional theatre in 1956. He left for Canada in 1959.

Having won a scholarship from the Canada Council, Files attended the National Theatre School at Montreal and Stratford, Ontario – joining the second acting year of the school in 1961 and graduating three years later. He subsequently joined John Hirsch's Manitoba Theatre Company for one season, during which time he appeared in The Taming of the Shrew with Len Cariou, and Mother Courage with Zoe Caldwell. Returning to Toronto, he played leads in The Provok'd Wife, and Oh, What a Lovely War! at the Crest Theatre – winning a Telegram Award for the most promising newcomer for the latter. Files then left Canada to pursue his career in the United Kingdom for the next four years.

While at theatre school, Files did numerous television productions for "Shoestring Theatre" at CBC Montreal. He started working in CBC radio drama with several productions for Rupert Kaplan, who was one of the first to do Eugene O'Neill's plays on radio. He also appeared in two films for the National Film Board of Canada, Henry Hudson and The Selkirk Settlers.

== Career ==
=== London ===
In London, Files joined the Theatre Workshop London's tour of Oh, What a Lovely War! to East Germany (for the Berliner Fest), West Germany and Belgium. Returning from Europe, he joined the company of the Bristol Old Vic, where he stayed for a season and a half performing leads and supports in Serjeant Musgrave's Dance, Man and Superman, Bartholomew Fair, Andorra, The Creeper and finally A Tale of Two Cities. In London, he worked for the International Theatre Club at the Mercury Theatre, Notting Hill Gate in Clope and The Guy and finally went to the Edinburgh Festival with their production of Sancticity, which was done at the Traverse Theatre. He also worked at Colchester Rep. for several productions, played Marat in The Promise for the Liverpool Rep., and finally appeared in the West End rock musical Your Very Own Thing at the Comedy Theatre, before returning to Canada.

During this period, Files also worked for the BBC, playing Maurice in Bruno, Konstantin in The Young Visiters and Joseph Warr in Softly, Softly; he also played Igor Gouzenko in the docu-drama The Spies. His BBC work included radio: among his roles were Stoney Jackson in Arnold Wesker's Their Very Own and Golden City. He also appeared in the MGM film The Dirty Dozen. His ability with accents proved very useful when he was invited to join the team of actors voicing Gerry Anderson's Supermarionation features at Century 21 Productions: Files started with the film Thunderbird 6, then went on to perform voices for the TV series Captain Scarlet and the Mysterons (including Captain Magenta), Joe 90 and The Secret Service (as Matthew, one of the lead characters), and also appeared in the pilot episode – "Identified" – of Anderson's live-action series UFO.

=== Canada ===
On returning to Canada, Files joined the company of the Royal Manitoba Theatre Centre for three plays Hail Skrawdyke, Harry Noon and Night and The Snow Queen. He then joined the Stratford National Theatre at the National Arts Centre, Ottawa, to play the lead in The Hostage, and also appeared in three plays by Mrozek.

From there, he went to the Calgary Theatre Company for a season doing The Knack, The Father, The Taming of the Shrew, Trip, Dracula and The Birthday Party. He then joined the Stratford Festival Company for two plays: The Italian Straw Hat and There's One in Every Marriage. For the next several years, he played leads and supports in many Canadian companies, starting with Philadelphia, Here I Come! for Theatre New Brunswick, then Loot for the Saidye Bronfmann Centre, The Trial and Twelfth Night for Toronto Arts Theatre. There followed A Quiet Day in Belfast for the Tarragon Theatre, Loot again for Theatre Plus, AC/DC for the New Theatre, Twelfth Night again for the National Arts Centre Ottawa, Rosencrantz and Guildenstern Are Dead for the Press Theatre, Butley in Butley for the Bastion Theatre, Relatively Speaking for Theatre Calgary and finally a review The Best of Jest for the Teller's Cage restaurant in Toronto, after which Files returned to Australia.

During this time in Canada, Files also did continuing radio drama for CBC Radio as well as being a presenter on the children's television show Polka Dot Door for OECA; he also did a drama, Prophecy, for them. There followed Angie in A Very Quiet Street with Keenan Wynn for Sterno Productions and finally Hardin in the TV series The Frankie Howerd Show for CBC Television. He also began a writing career with CBC Radio, beginning with several programmes in the series The Age of Elegance, then three programmes in The Bush and the Salon series, as well as adapting the science-fiction classics Gas Mask and Tomorrow's Child. Also a 17-episode series The Many Faces of Music, and ongoing satirical skits for As It Happens with Don Cullen.

=== Australia ===
On his return to Melbourne, Files played the lead in City Sugar for the Melbourne Theatre Company before joining the South Australian Theatre Company in Adelaide for City Sugar again, then Henry IV, Parts 1 and 2 and They Shoot Horses, Don't They?. Sydney and the Opera House were next doing The Lady From Maxim's for the Old Tote Theatre Company. Back to Melbourne for the Playbox Theatre Company to do Edgar in The Dance of Death then Buried Child and Curse of the Starving Class, which also went to the Adelaide Festival. Long Day's Journey into Night for Playbox followed by Crimes of the Heart for the MTC. Woodworm and Insignificance for the Playbox – the latter touring to the Festival of Sydney and another appearance at the Opera House. To which he returned months later to play Harry Brock in Born Yesterday for the Sydney Theatre Company.

Over the next several years, Files continued to play leads and supports in theatre. Recent work starts with Shorts at the Wharf for the S.T.C. then Mickey in Hurley Burley for the M.T.C., Stalin in Master Class for the H.V.T.C., George Coppin in Occupation Comedian for the Writer's Theatre, Gerald in Woman in Mind for the M.T.C. then A Hard God for N.E.T.C. Oscar Wilde in Oscar Wilde at the Cafe Royale for the Melbourne International Festival, For Better For Worse for Chapel Off Chapel, Alive at Williamstown Pier at the Beckett Theatre, Mysteries for the Keene/Taylor Company, Go in Tight for La Mama, Father Smythe in the Australian musical Eureka at Her Majesty's Theatre, Dr Sweet in Bug for Red Stitch Theatre, Uncle Konrad in The Revisionist for Summers/Blackman and the Rev. Tooker in Cat on a Hot Tin Roof for the M.T.C. He has toured Tasmania with the period instrument group Nuove Musiche Ensemble reading Elizabethan and Jacobean poetry and prose.

=== Film and television ===
Files has appeared in several Australian films, Money Movers, The Club, Evil Angels (A Cry in the Dark), Mull and Dead End. He has also appeared in the short films "Remembering Nigel", Vigilant Healthy! Wholesome", "Desperate" and "The Wardrobe" (which he also wrote). As well as voicing two animated features The Littlest Convict and Abra-Cadabra, he also manipulated and voiced the lead muppets Simon Smedley and Aunt Matilda in The Arcade Show and Smedley's Weekly two TV series for children for the ABC. He has recently played the lead in the Tasmanian Raw Nerve initiative short film "Love Train."

He has appeared in over 35 television series and features for Australian television, the most memorable being Desert Foxes, Corp. Andy Edwards in Rusty Bugles, Punishment, Fred Ferguson in Prisoner, Slasher Grey in The Great Bookie Robbery, Tom Ramsay in the soap Neighbours (in 1986, and again in 1990–91 and returned for a guest stint in the show's 30th year, 2015), Fred Daly in The True Believers, Frankie in Rafferty's Rules, Zeke La Russo in Inside Running, Sam McHeath in Skirts, Henry Barnes in Correlli, Kevin Howard in two series of Pig's Breakfast, Fergus Marshall in the TV series MDA, Wally Chubb in "City Homicide" and 'Doc' Evatt in "I Spry". He also played Raymon Radley in both of the animated TV series of Dogstar. Other animated TV series he has appeared in have been Quads and Ocean Girl.

=== Theatre director ===
Files started directing in 1993 when he co-founded the Period Pieces Company in an effort to revive classical theatre in Melbourne as it should be experienced. This was a company of Melbourne actors who performed readings of the classics with a complete cast. He has directed There's One in Every Marriage, The Medieval Mystery Plays, A Flea in Her Ear, Trelawny of the "Wells", When We Are Married, Rookery Nook. The Devil is an Ass and the one-act opera Lo Sposo Deluso by Mozart, all for Period Pieces.

In 1998 Files was artistic director of Crossing the Line, doing performed readings of plays by screenwriters at the Melbourne Writer's Festival at the Malthouse. For that he directed Snoop and Gossamer. He also directed the play Allison's Rub for La Mama and the Melbourne International Comedy Festival and has since directed Dorothy Parker Says for Michele Stayner at the Chapel Off Chapel.

=== Writer ===
Files writing career continued in Australia. He wrote the four-part comedy serial Uncle Vinny's Wireless for ABC–Radio, for which he won an AWGIE Award from the Australian Writers' Guild. He has also written, co-produced and performed the comedy series Bruce Roxon The All Australian Time Traveller for ABC–Radio, and adapted Tomorrow's Child as a series for ABC–Radio Schools. In 1984, he adapted and read to air an adaptation of the science-fiction novel The Man in the Maze for 3LO. He wrote and performed two programmes for the National Gallery of Victoria: Wedgewood – An 18th Century First and The Spirit of Art. He wrote and performed an episode of the ABC-Radio series Hindsight: "To The Ends of the Earth", about Australia's Canadian convicts. As well as two short films which he also appeared in "The Wardrobe" and "Salt Anyone?"

== Personal life ==
Files' daughter by his wife Elva Mai Hoover, a Canadian actress whom he met in London, is the horror fiction writer Gemma Files.
