= Mike Trim =

British artist and miniature model-maker

- Occupations: Designer; model-maker; storyboard artist
- Years active: 1964–present
- Employer: AP Films (1964–1970)
- Notable work: Thunderbirds; Thunderbirds Are Go; Captain Scarlet and the Mysterons; Joe 90

Mike Trim is a British artist and miniature model-maker known for his design work on the TV and film productions of AP Films in the 1960s. He is also remembered for illustrating the cover of Jeff Wayne's Musical Version of The War of the Worlds (1978), which depicts a Martian tripod striking down HMS Thunder Child. A book of Trim's illustrations, titled The Future was FAB: The Art of Mike Trim, was released in 2006.

== Early life ==
Trim grew up in Fulham and attended Christopher Wren School. He later completed a two-year course in graphic design at the London School of Printing.

== Career ==
In 1964, Trim's father saw a newspaper advertisement seeking model-makers for a film company, Gerry and Sylvia Anderson's AP Films (APF). Towards the end of production on Stingray, Trim was hired as a designer and model-maker for APF, subsequently working on the TV series Thunderbirds, Captain Scarlet and the Mysterons, Joe 90, The Secret Service, and UFO, as well as the feature films Thunderbirds Are Go, Thunderbird 6, and Journey to the Far Side of the Sun (a.k.a. Doppelgänger).

Starting out in the model shop, Trim eventually became special effects director Derek Meddings' assistant in designing the futuristic vehicles, buildings, and look of the Andersons' series. He eventually took on the bulk of design work for the TV series as Meddings became more involved in feature films.

After contributing a single (unused) vehicle design and model to Space: 1999, Trim moved into freelance illustration, painting the cover for the album Jeff Wayne's Musical Version of The War of the Worlds in 1978.
