= Captain Scarlet =

Captain Scarlet or Captain Scarlett may refer to:

- Captain Scarlett, a 1953 film starring Richard Greene
- Captain Scarlet and the Mysterons, a 1967–68 science-fiction TV series
  - Captain Scarlet vs. the Mysterons, a 1980 television film based on the 1960s series
  - New Captain Scarlet, a 2005 remake of the 1960s series
  - Captain Scarlet (character), the lead character of both the original series and the CGI remake
- Captain Scarlett, a character in Borderlands 2 DLC "Captain Scarlett and Her Pirate's Booty"

== See also ==
- Revenge of the Mysterons from Mars, a 1981 television film based on the 1960s series
