= Spectrum Strikes Back =

- Captain Scarlet and the Mysterons episode
- Episode no.: Episode 10
- Directed by: Ken Turner
- Written by: Tony Barwick
- Cinematography by: Julien Lugrin
- Editing by: Bob Dearberg
- Production code: SCA 9
- Original air date: 24 November 1967

Guest character voices
- Gary Files (uncredited) as Captain Indigo and the 1st and 3rd game wardens; Martin King (uncredited) as the 2nd game warden; Paul Maxwell as the World President; Charles Tingwell as Space General Peterson; Jeremy Wilkin as Dr Giadello

Episode chronology
| ← Previous "Seek and Destroy" | Next → "Avalanche" |

"Spectrum Strikes Back" is the tenth episode of Captain Scarlet and the Mysterons, a British Supermarionation television series created by Gerry and Sylvia Anderson and filmed by their production company Century 21 Productions. Written by Tony Barwick and directed by Ken Turner, it was first broadcast on 24 November 1967 on ATV Midlands.

Set in 2068, the series depicts a "war of nerves" between Earth and the Mysterons: a hostile race of Martians with the power to create functioning copies of destroyed people or objects and use them to carry out acts of aggression against humanity. Earth is defended by a military organisation called Spectrum, whose top agent, Captain Scarlet, was murdered by the Mysterons and replaced by a reconstruction that later broke free of their control. Scarlet's double has a self-healing power that enables him to recover from injuries that would be fatal to anyone else, making him Spectrum's best asset in its fight against the Mysterons.

Following on from the events of "Operation Time", the plot of "Spectrum Strikes Back" concerns a secret conference in which a Spectrum scientist unveils two weapons that have been developed for use against the Mysterons. However, a Mysteron agent sets a trap that leaves the conference delegates in mortal danger.

== Plot ==
Under the aliases "Mr Tiger", "Mr Panther" and "Mr Bear", Colonel White, Captain Scarlet and Captain Blue travel to an African game reserve to attend a secret conference that is being held underground in a space beneath a hunting lodge. The host, Spectrum Intelligence scientist Dr Giadello, unveils two anti-Mysteron devices inspired by the discoveries that Spectrum made when the Mysterons tried to assassinate General Tiempo. The "Mysteron Gun" fires an electron beam that permanently destroys Mysteron reconstructions by exploiting their vulnerability to electricity, while the "Mysteron Detector" is a radiographic camera that identifies reconstructions from their resistance to X-rays.

Unknown to the delegates, Captain Indigo, a Spectrum officer working undercover as the lodge's waiter, is murdered by Captain Black and reconstructed in the service of the Mysterons. When the Mysteron Detector reveals his true nature, Indigo's double sabotages the conference by activating the controls that lower the hunting lodge into the ground. He then escapes in a car with the key to the controls, leaving the delegates to be crushed by the building bearing down on them from above.

Arming himself with the Mysteron Gun, Scarlet leaves the conference room via its lift to confront Indigo. The lift becomes inoperable when the lodge starts its descent, removing the other delegates' sole means of escape and forcing Scarlet to pursue Indigo in a second car to retrieve the key. Down in the conference room, Blue slows the lodge's descent by repeatedly firing his handgun into the ceiling at the spot where the controls are located above, damaging the circuits.

Scarlet catches up with Indigo and one of the reserve's game wardens shoots the Mysteron agent with his rifle. However, the wound is not fatal, so Scarlet uses the Mysteron Gun to finish him off. Speeding back to the lodge with the key, Scarlet reverses the building's descent moments before the delegates are killed. Later, all present agree that while the day proved most trying, it was also a most satisfactory one in the end with the Mysteron Gun and Detector having proven their worth in the field.

== Regular voice cast ==
- Ed Bishop as Captain Blue
- Cy Grant as Lieutenant Green
- Donald Gray as Colonel White, Captain Black and the Mysterons
- Janna Hill as Symphony Angel
- Francis Matthews as Captain Scarlet
- Liz Morgan as Destiny Angel and Rhapsody Angel

== Production ==
The working title for this episode was "Spectrum Strike Back". "Spectrum Strikes Back" features the second appearance of the World President, who was targeted by the Mysterons in the first episode. The Mysteron Gun was designed by the series' special effects director, Derek Meddings. Filming of the episode began on 13 March 1967. The puppet playing Captain Indigo previously appeared as Macey in "Big Ben Strikes Again". The incidental music for both this episode and "Avalanche" was recorded in a four-hour studio session held on 11 June 1967 with a 15-member band.

Dialogue in the episode states that only high-voltage electricity can kill Mysteron agents, yet in both earlier and later episodes (including "Winged Assassin", "Manhunt", "White As Snow" and "Shadow of Fear") they are shot dead with conventional firearms. While the Mysteron Detector appears in later episodes, the Mysteron Gun is never again seen or mentioned in the series (although it is referenced in the 1967 tie-in novel Captain Scarlet and the Mysterons published by Armada Books). The audio play Captain Scarlet versus Captain Black features a Spectrum weapon called the "electro-ray rifle", which has similar properties.

== Reception ==
James Stansfield of Den of Geek considers "Spectrum Strikes Back" to be the tenth-best episode of Captain Scarlet, believing it memorable for introducing the Mysteron Gun and Detector as well as for "some unintentional hilarity with the nicknames used by the Spectrum agents". He questions the game reserve's apparent lack of security as well as the role of Indigo, noting that despite being a Spectrum captain he has been given the "humiliating task" of waiting on the conference delegates.

Writer Fred McNamara praises "Spectrum Strikes Back" for "paying heed" to past Captain Scarlet episodes, stating that this continuity "highlights the narrative ambition that [the series] sometimes displays". He is less complimentary of other aspects, calling the plot "convoluted" and the conclusion "unfulfilling" and generally commenting that the episode "[relies] more on worldbuilding and character dynamics than explosion" (though adding that the former help to make the series "feel more real"). He criticises the episode's "lack of logic", questioning what the Mysterons intend to gain by sabotaging the conference given that the gun and detector are already developed, and describes Indigo as "pure script fodder" with an unsatisfying lack of backstory compared to fellow Mysteron victim Captain Brown in the first episode.

In a review for Andersonic, Vincent Law names the episode "one of the most convoluted and inconsistent" of Captain Scarlet, criticising elements such as the design of the hunting lodge: "... descending underground for reasons of secrecy is bizarre, as surely any passer-by would become immediately suspicious when a non-descript building started sinking into the ground!" He praises the story's moments of "light relief" as well as Barry Gray's musical score, but questions why the trapped delegates do not simply use the lift to escape given that Indigo's Mysteron reconstruction used it moments earlier. Shane M. Dallmann of Video Watchdog magazine describes the descending lodge as a "Bondian deathtrap".

The Mysteron Gun and Detector have also drawn comment. Andrew Pixley and Julie Rogers of Starburst magazine write that the gun, "although fantastically useful, is never seen again." Law and McNamara regret its absence from later episodes, with Law noting also that the detector re-appears only occasionally. McNamara likens the gun to a cross between a "hoverpack" and a watering can, while Pixley and Rogers compare the detector to a car radiator grille.
