= Launcher =

Launcher may refer to:

- Application launcher, a kind of utility software
- Rocket launcher, a device that launches a rocket-propelled projectile
- Grenade launcher, a weapon that launches a specially designed grenade
- Launch vehicle, a rocket used to carry a payload from Earth's surface into space
- Launcher (company), an American rocket company and launch service provider
- Launcher, a video game section of The Washington Post

== See also ==
- Launch (disambiguation)
- Launched (2000 album) hardcore punk album by Beatsteaks
- The Launching (1968 TV episode) episode of Captain Scarlet
