= Avalanche (Captain Scarlet and the Mysterons) =

- Captain Scarlet and the Mysterons episode
- Episode no.: Episode 11
- Directed by: Brian Burgess
- Written by: Shane Rimmer
- Cinematography by: Paddy Seale
- Editing by: Harry MacDonald
- Production code: SCA 10
- Original air date: 27 October 1967

Guest character voices
- Gary Files (uncredited) as Eddie, Trapper & Big Bear Sentry; Martin King (uncredited) as Red Deer Sentry (Joe) & Cariboo Sentry; Paul Maxwell as General Ward; Charles Tingwell as Sergeant Marshall; Jeremy Wilkin as Lieutenant Burroughs & Radio Actor

Episode chronology
← Previous "Spectrum Strikes Back"	Next → "Shadow of Fear"

"Avalanche" is the 11th episode of Captain Scarlet and the Mysterons, a British Supermarionation television series created by Gerry and Sylvia Anderson and produced by their company Century 21 Productions. It marked the scriptwriting debut of Century 21 voice actor Shane Rimmer, and was first broadcast on 27 October 1967 on ATV Midlands.

Set in 2068, the series depicts a "war of nerves" between Earth and the Mysterons: a race of Martians with the power to create functioning copies of destroyed people or objects and use them to carry out acts of aggression against humanity. Earth is defended by a military organisation called Spectrum, whose top agent, Captain Scarlet, was killed by the Mysterons and replaced by a reconstruction that subsequently broke free of their control. Scarlet's double has a self-healing power that enables him to recover from injuries that would be fatal to anyone else, making him Spectrum's best asset in its fight against the Mysterons.

In "Avalanche", the Mysterons destroy and reconstruct a maintenance technician and his snowcat to attack the Frost Line Outer Space Defence System in Canada.

== Plot ==
The Frost Line Outer Space Defence System is a network of missile bases in Northern Canada, tasked with protecting Earth from extraterrestrial threats. In a transmission to Earth, the Mysterons warn Spectrum that they intend to attack key Frost Line installations. They use their powers to destroy a snowcat driven by maintenance technician Eddie and reconstruct both Eddie and the snowcat as agents in their service. The reconstructed Eddie passes security at two bases – Red Deer and Cariboo – and plants devices inside their ventilation systems that render the air unbreathable, killing 250 personnel at Red Deer and 70 at Cariboo.

In a transmission to Cloudbase, the belligerent Frost Line commander General Ward warns Colonel White that he will fire missiles at Mars if another base is attacked. Fearing the Mysterons' response to such an action, White orders Captain Scarlet and Lieutenant Green to investigate Red Deer. Arriving at the base, the officers discover that the personnel have suffocated not due to the introduction of a toxic gas, but the removal of all oxygen from the air.

Obtaining a Spectrum Pursuit Vehicle from a trapper, Scarlet and Green speed to the next base, Big Bear, only to learn that Eddie has already passed through and is now on his way to the Frost Line command centre. After knocking out a guard who is barring entry to the base, Green removes Eddie's oxygen-depletion device from the ventilation system before it can affect the air. Meanwhile, Scarlet takes the SPV and chases Eddie. The snowcat is carrying liquid oxygen, which Eddie dumps into Scarlet's path to force him off the road. Scarlet draws his gun and fires several rounds into a snow-covered slope nearby; this triggers an avalanche that pushes the snowcat over a cliff, causing it to explode on the rocks below. With the command centre saved, Ward, no less arrogant than before, radios Cloudbase to make peace with White.

== Regular voice cast ==
- Ed Bishop as Captain Blue
- Cy Grant as Lieutenant Green
- Donald Gray as Colonel White and the Mysterons
- Francis Matthews as Captain Scarlet
- Liz Morgan as Destiny Angel

== Production ==
Actor Shane Rimmer had a prior association with Century 21, having voiced the character Scott Tracy in Thunderbirds; he also wrote and narrated the "recap" segments for the series' alternative two-part episode format. Impressed by his work, the Andersons asked him to write an episode of Captain Scarlet. Rimmer immediately agreed and was soon telephoned by series script editor Tony Barwick, who had an outline for an episode titled "Avalanche" and told Rimmer that a courier would "[drop] the storyline over to you in about an hour. Take today and tomorrow and see how you'd go about filling it in." Rimmer put together a draft treatment over the next 24 hours; he found the characters and plot elements a "heavy mix to juggle with" but managed to incorporate "one or two workable story developments that avoided stepping on the toes of the series concept or any of the main characters." Rimmer and Barwick revised the draft two days after. After the script for "Avalanche" was completed, Rimmer started work on treatments for the episodes "Expo 2068" and "Inferno" – jobs that, in his words, "more or less took care of '67". He later wrote scripts for Joe 90, The Secret Service and The Protectors.

The script began with a description of the domes that make up the Frost Line Command Centre: "Deep snow surrounds the plexiglass domes ... From the large central dome acting as a hub, avenues run off in eight directions. At the end of each spoke at varying distances from the centre are smaller domes. Each dome is airtight and serviced by an artificial atmosphere from an air-conditioning dome." Chris Bentley, author of The Complete Gerry Anderson: The Authorised Episode Guide, suggests that some of this detail was lost in the transition from script to screen. On arrival at Red Deer Base, Scarlet and Green were described as wearing "space-type helmets"; in the episode as filmed, they wear breathing masks and their standard Spectrum caps.

Eddie's snowcat was designed by special effects assistant Mike Trim, who had been interested in snowcats since childhood. The inspiration for the design was a caterpillar-track truck concept that Trim had produced for the Thunderbirds episode "End of the Road". To match the construction of the puppet set, Trim was forced to alter shape of the cabin, which he felt ended up "[giving] the final model a more upright look than I had hoped for." The Frost Line domes that appear in the episode are represented not by scale models, but painted flats.

Filming began on 13 April 1967. The incidental music was recorded on 11 June in a four-hour session at series composer Barry Gray's private studio, where it was performed by a group of 15 instrumentalists. Music for "Spectrum Strikes Back" was recorded during the same session. The main tracks for "Avalanche" are "Mountain Pass" (which accompanies the scene leading up to the death of the original Eddie) and "Deadly Mist and Mountain Chase" (which accompanies Scarlet's pursuit of the snowcat).

== Reception ==
James Stansfield of Den of Geek considers "Avalanche" the seventh-best episode of Captain Scarlet, praising its "exciting" climax. Fred McNamara writes that the episode successfully "balances adventure and atmosphere" with an "evolving sense of dread", adding that its "familiar premise, sublime model and set work, excellent pacing, and overarching themes of power and war" make it a "highly rewarding" instalment.

The episode has drawn comment for its theme of interplanetary conflict and depiction of the military. Stansfield comments that "Avalanche" is of several episodes that show how humanity's "flaws and ineptitude" can become more of a threat than the Mysterons themselves, arguing that General Ward essentially serves as the episode's secondary antagonist. Geoff Willmetts of sfcrowsnest.com offers a similar view on Ward, writing that the character underlines humanity's militaristic and belligerent aspects: "This Earth's reality is clearly far too aggressive compared to our own". Reviewing "Avalanche" for FAB magazine in 1993, Ian Fryer praised Ward's characterisation for introducing a "second layer of military as a repository for misgivings about the armed services." McNamara applauds the casting of dual adversaries, Mysteron and military, writing that the latter's "trigger-happy stubbornness" in the face of alien aggression blurs the boundary between heroes and villains and reveals a grey morality. He considers the ending all the more effective for the absence of a "clean resolution" between Spectrum and its Earth-bound opponents, noting that there has been no "epiphany" for Ward's forces and the general himself is no less arrogant than he was at the beginning of the episode.

Fryer remarks that the total number of deaths either seen or reported in the episode (more than 300) "must surely be a record for an Anderson series", pointing out that despite this the episode is certified U by the British Board of Film Classification. Stansfield, who considers the demise of the original Eddie particularly violent, calls the death toll "easily ... the highest body count of the series" and "a pretty large number for any TV show, let alone one for youngsters".

"Avalanche" is one of only a few episodes in which Lieutenant Green plays a significant role, joining Scarlet in the field while Captain Blue steps in as communications officer aboard Cloudbase. Stansfield and McNamara praise Rimmer's use of the character.
