= Winged Assassin =

- Captain Scarlet and the Mysterons episode
- Episode no.: Episode 2
- Directed by: David Lane
- Written by: Tony Barwick
- Cinematography by: Paddy Seale
- Editing by: Harry MacDonald
- Production code: SCA 2
- Original air date: 6 October 1967

Guest character voices
- Janna Hill as; Intercontinental Airlines Announcer: Martin King (uncredited) as; DT-19 Co-Pilot: Paul Maxwell as; DT-19 Pilot: Neil McCallum (uncredited) as; Airport Chief: Charles Tingwell as; Captain Brown (flashback) Spectrum Agent 042 Air Traffic Controller: Jeremy Wilkin as; Director General Xian Yoh Director General's Decoy

Episode chronology
| ← Previous "The Mysterons" | Next → "Big Ben Strikes Again" |

"Winged Assassin" is the second episode of Captain Scarlet and the Mysterons, a British Supermarionation television series created by Gerry and Sylvia Anderson and filmed by their production company Century 21 Productions. Written by Tony Barwick and directed by David Lane, it was first broadcast on 6 October 1967 on ATV Midlands.

Set in 2068, the series depicts a "war of nerves" between Earth and the Mysterons: a hostile race of Martians with the ability to create functioning copies of destroyed people or objects and use these reconstructions to carry out specific acts of aggression against humanity. Earth is defended by a military organisation called Spectrum, whose top agent, Captain Scarlet, was murdered by the Mysterons and replaced with a reconstruction that later broke free of their control. The Scarlet double has inherited the Mysterons' power of retro-metabolism, that enables him to recover from injuries that would be fatal to any other person, effectively making him "indestructible" as well as Spectrum's foremost asset in its fight against the Mysterons. In a direct continuation from pilot episode "The Mysterons", "Winged Assassin" sees Scarlet establish his indestructibility while Spectrum attempts to prevent the Mysterons from assassinating the Director General of the United Asian Republic.

In 1980, "Winged Assassin" was re-edited to form a segment of the Captain Scarlet compilation film Captain Scarlet vs. the Mysterons, produced by the New York office of ITC Entertainment. During the BBC's 2001–2002 re-run of the series, the episode was postponed from its intended transmission date due to perceived similarities between the story and the attacks of September 11, 2001. "Winged Assassin" has been positively received by commentators and is frequently cited as one of the best episodes of the series.

== Plot ==
Transmitting to Earth, the Mysterons warn Spectrum that they intend to kill Xian Yoh, the Director General of the United Asian Republic, who is currently in London on a state visit. An assassination attempt in the Director General's hotel room is thwarted by Captain Grey.

Maximum security is imposed at London International Airport, from which the Director General is due to leave the country. At the request of Colonel White, the resurrected Mysteron double of Captain Scarlet – whom Dr Fawn has determined to be free of Mysteron control and effectively "indestructible" after the Mysterons' failure to assassinate the World President – returns to duty to help lead the operation. Accompanied by the Angel fighter squadron, Scarlet and Captain Blue depart Cloudbase in a Spectrum Passenger Jet and fly to London.

Meanwhile, the Mysterons use their powers to create a massive systems failure on board an airliner, Flight DT-19, causing it to crash into the ocean and explode. A Mysteron reconstruction of the plane, devoid of crew and passengers, continues on the original flight path from New York to London.

As a double of the Director General is driven in to London Airport in a decoy motorcade, the real Xian Yoh arrives in Spectrum's "Yellow Fox" – a secure transport disguised as an aircraft fuel tanker – and discreetly boards his private jet. As DT-19 lands, Scarlet, watching the operation from the control tower with Blue, experiences a sudden nausea that he interprets as a warning that the Director General is in danger. At that moment, DT-19 breaks away from the terminal and rushes towards the jet.

Ordering the jet to take off immediately, Scarlet and Blue intercept DT-19 in their Spectrum Pursuit Vehicle. The plane is unhindered by the Angels' airstrikes, and when the captains target its undercarriage with the SPV's rockets, the launch mechanism jams. Ignoring Blue's protests, Scarlet ejects him and rams DT-19's wheels, destroying them and bringing the plane to a crashing halt. He is fatally injured when the SPV collides with a radar bunker. Meanwhile, the jet takes off but hits one of DT-19's wings and crashes into a field, killing the Director General and everyone else on board. As Scarlet's body is taken away in an ambulance, the airport chief assumes that he is dead, to which Blue replies: "Maybe he didn't die ... in vain."

== Regular voice cast ==
- Sylvia Anderson as Melody Angel
- Ed Bishop as Captain Blue
- Cy Grant as Lieutenant Green
- Donald Gray as Colonel White and the Mysterons
- Francis Matthews as Captain Scarlet
- Paul Maxwell as Captain Grey
- Liz Morgan as Destiny Angel and Rhapsody Angel
- Charles Tingwell as Dr Fawn
- Jeremy Wilkin as Captain Ochre

== Production ==
In Tony Barwick's script, the DT-19 co-pilot is called Johnson. Dialogue in the episode indicates that it is set on 10 July, the same day as the events of "Treble Cross" and the closing scene of "Flight to Atlantica". Barwick was fond of inserting references to 10 July as that was his birthday; as a result, fans of Captain Scarlet frequently observe July 10 as "Captain Scarlet Day". The scale model of the entrance to London International Airport was designed by special effects assistant Mike Trim.

"Winged Assassin" is the first episode of Captain Scarlet to feature contributions from uncredited voice actor Neil McCallum, who also voiced guest characters in the episodes "Big Ben Strikes Again", "Codename Europa" and "Expo 2068". The episode also marks the first appearance of the series' secondary title sequence, in which the Mysterons transmit their latest threat to Spectrum while the green Mysteron "eyes" (or "rings") slide menacingly over members of the regular puppet cast. These shots were recorded during the filming of "Winged Assassin". The episode's incidental music – a suite running to 4 minutes and 38 seconds – was recorded by series composer Barry Gray in a four-hour studio session on 3 April 1967.

During his examination by Dr Fawn, the ex-Mysteron Scarlet has a flashback to his murder by the aliens in the previous episode. This sequence omits the blue monochrome effect that was used to indicate the aliens' presence in that episode.

== Broadcast and reception ==
When the series began a re-run on BBC Two in September 2001, "Winged Assassin" was originally due to be broadcast on 17 September as the second episode, matching the order of production. However, it was postponed due to similarities between the story (featuring a plane hi-jacked by the Mysterons) and the terrorist attacks of earlier that month. Around this time, the Captain Scarlet pages on the website of the series' distributor, Carlton, were briefly taken offline. The episode was ultimately broadcast on 10 December 2001.

The British Board of Film Classification certifies the episode U, noting that it contains "some action and mild horror".

=== Critical response ===
"Winged Assassin" is considered one of the best episodes of Captain Scarlet by Anthony Clark of sci-fi-online.com and a series highlight by Mike Fillis of Cult Times and Ultimate DVD magazines. Fillis praises effects director Derek Meddings for working "miniature magic" with the DT-19 scale model. Rick Sanchez of IGN regards the scene in which Scarlet forcibly ejects Blue from the SPV as an example of superior writing.

Writer Ian Fryer regards "Winged Assassin" as Captain Scarlet's "key episode", stating that no instalment "expresses the horror of the series concept better". He praises the "deadpan" presentation of the original DT-19's destruction as well as the "genuinely thrilling" climax, which he regards as the best of any Captain Scarlet episode. He argues that the Mysteron victory "[establishes] this invisible enemy as a truly formidable opponent" while noting that the episode as a whole "treads a fine line between adult themes and suitability for the young audience". Andrew Thomas of Dreamwatch magazine comments that the shots of the reconstructed DT-19 "sat menacingly" on the London Airport runway, "with the controls moving on their own and row upon row of empty seats ... is a chilling one, and sets the pattern for the series." Chris Bentley, author of Captain Scarlet: The Vault, calls the conclusion "startling", commenting that the Mysteron win greatly increases the tension in later episodes. He contrasts this with episodes of earlier Anderson productions, which "always ended happily, with missions accomplished and lives saved."

Writer Fred McNamara considers the story "lacklustre and frustrating" as well as "somewhat pedestrian" compared to the first episode and "Big Ben Strikes Again", noting that "Winged Assassin" is the second episode in a row to feature a world leader at risk of assassination. He also describes the subplot involving Captain Grey as "dull" and unimaginatively written, and expresses disappointment that Spectrum's examination of Scarlet's new ex-Mysteron nature is confined to a few scenes at the start of the episode: "It's as if the writers suddenly remember there's the rest of the episode to crack on with [...] it's exasperating how the questions seem to have been given an answer that's just within our reach, only to be snatched away in an instant." However, he praises the "gripping" ending, believing that the Mysterons' success in eliminating the Director General lends a "darkly vibrant flavour" to the episode as well as a sense of "alarming immediacy" to the threat the aliens pose: "... at just two episodes in, we're presented with the Mysterons' first victory against Spectrum."
