= Relaunch =

To relaunch means to launch again.

Relaunch may also refer to:

- Relaunch (horse) (1976–1996), an American Thoroughbred racehorse and sire
- "Relaunch" / "Irrational Sheet Music" (Japanese: りふじんながくふ, romanized: Rifujin na Gakufu; 2021), episode 11 of anime series Godzilla Singular Point
- "Re-Launch" (2012), episode 1 of season 2 of American television sitcom New Girl
