= Renegade Rocket =

- Captain Scarlet and the Mysterons episode
- Episode no.: Episode 7
- Directed by: Brian Burgess
- Written by: Ralph Hart
- Cinematography by: Paddy Seale
- Editing by: Bob Dearberg
- Production code: SCA 7
- Original air date: 19 January 1968

Guest character voices
- Gary Files (uncredited) as Space Major Reeves; Martin King (uncredited) as Sergeant and Airstrip Controller; Paul Maxwell as Base Commander; Charles Tingwell as Launch Controller; Jeremy Wilkin as Yacht Captain and Security Guard

Episode chronology
← Previous "Operation Time"	Next → "White as Snow"

"Renegade Rocket" is the seventh episode of Captain Scarlet and the Mysterons, a British Supermarionation television series created by Gerry and Sylvia Anderson and filmed by their production company Century 21 Productions. Written by Ralph Hart and directed by Brian Burgess, it was first broadcast on 19 January 1968 on ATV Midlands.

Set in 2068, the series depicts a "war of nerves" between Earth and the Mysterons: a hostile race of Martians with the power to create functioning copies of destroyed people or objects and use them to carry out acts of aggression against humanity. Earth is defended by a military organisation called Spectrum, whose top agent, Captain Scarlet, was murdered by the Mysterons and replaced by a reconstruction that later broke free of their control. Scarlet's double has a self-healing power that enables him to recover from injuries that would be fatal to anyone else, making him Spectrum's best asset in its fight against the Mysterons.

In "Renegade Rocket", Spectrum fights to stop a hi-jacked incendiary rocket from destroying an unknown target.

== Plot ==
Space Major Reeves, a rocket expert and friend of Colonel White, leaves Cloudbase after completing a tour of the facility. He boards a motor yacht bound for the island military installation Base Concord, unaware that Captain Black is watching from the shore. Black uses the Mysterons' powers to induce nausea in Reeves, who falls overboard and drowns in the yacht's wake.

A Mysteron double of Reeves arrives at Base Concord, shoots the control room officer and launches an incendiary variable-geometry rocket (VGR) using the control code "ZERO". He then escapes in a J-17 fighter jet with the flight program unit, leaving the base personnel no way of knowing the VGR's target nor which of the 10,000 possible codes must be transmitted to trigger its self-destruct. Furthermore, for reasons unknown the VGR is not showing on radar.

The commander alerts Spectrum and White dispatches Captains Scarlet and Blue to Base Concord. Meanwhile, the Angel squadron are launched to track down Reeves and recover the program unit. Reeves is quickly intercepted but refuses to surrender, instead crippling Melody's aircraft with his fighter's machine gun and forcing her to eject before she crashes into the ocean.

Scarlet, Blue and the base personnel realise that the VGR would be invisible to radar only if it were travelling upwards, and that as its descent will also be vertical the only plausible target is Base Concord itself. A replacement program unit is installed and the personnel use it to transmit one code after another in alphabetical order in a futile bid to find the one used by Reeves. In the air, Reeves ignores Rhapsody's order to surrender and kills himself by deliberately crashing his fighter. Although the program unit survives, it is lost on the seabed.

Minutes before impact, with Base Concord evacuated except for Scarlet and Blue, White radios his officers and orders them to leave. In a last-ditch attempt to save the base, Scarlet and Blue disobey White and carry on inputting codes, their final try being "AMEN". On the seabed, the sunken unit is knocked over by an underwater current and the shock causes it to re-transmit "ZERO", causing the VGR to self-destruct.

Scarlet and Blue return to Cloudbase believing that they miraculously found the correct code. After the unit is recovered, White reprimands the two captains for their insubordination but stops short of court-martialling them, recognising the value of bravery in the fight against the Mysterons.

== Regular voice cast ==
- Sylvia Anderson as Melody Angel
- Ed Bishop as Captain Blue
- Cy Grant as Lieutenant Green
- Donald Gray as Colonel White and the Mysterons
- Francis Matthews as Captain Scarlet
- Liz Morgan as Rhapsody Angel and Harmony Angel

== Production ==
"Renegade Rocket" was filmed on Century 21's Stage 3 over two weeks beginning on 27 February 1967. The miniature model of the J-17 fighter was built with parts from an Airfix Dassault Mirage III model kit.

The incidental music, performed by an ensemble of 12 instrumentalists, was recorded during a four-and-a-half-hour studio session held on 14 May 1967. Music for "Operation Time" was also recorded during this session.

== Reception ==
Anthony Clark of sci-fi-online.com describes "Renegade Rocket" as "just about average" and "about as dull as [Captain Scarlet] gets". He views the episode as an example of the series' "patchy" quality and questions Scarlet and Blue's motives for disobeying Colonel White given their extremely remote chances of finding the correct destruct code. Chris Bentley, author of Captain Scarlet: The Vault, criticises the editing of the VGR's final approach, pointing out that even though the rocket is destroyed before it hits the base, White, who is counting down the seconds to impact, still reaches zero. He calls the sequence "baffling".

Suggesting that the plot "could have similarly serviced a sitcom", Shane M. Dallmann of Video Watchdog magazine believes "Renegade Rocket" to be much less "gripping" than "Point 783", an episode about an out-of-control super-tank. Writer Fred McNamara also compares it negatively to that episode, commenting that the "gripping" and "strong" first half is let down by a generally "disjointed" pace and "awkward story-telling". Although he calls the revelation of the VGR's target "some nicely played-out drama", he finds the attempts to guess the destruct code "tedious", stating that "the further the episode progresses, the more the script runs out of steam, and instead of rattling along, merely plods, with no genuine direction." He criticises Spectrum and the military's choice of tactics, wondering why they do not simply launch another rocket to blow up the VGR, and argues that the evacuation of Base Concord renders the Mysteron threat "unsatisfying". He describes the VGR's destruction by sheer luck a "desperate way to end a desperate episode", summing up "Renegade Rocket" as "little more than pulling the trigger without a bullet, a bang without an impact".

In a review for the Andersonic website, Vincent Law notes that "Renegade Rocket" is one of many Anderson productions that focus on the dangers of "runaway machinery". Noting that the Reeves' Mysteron reconstruction effectively pulls rank on another military officer to launch the VGR, Law compares the character to a Cold War double agent and the plot to the satirical Cold War film Dr. Strangelove (1964), which concerns a frantic effort to avert a nuclear war. He criticises the dialogue and characterisation – questioning, for example, White's lack of upset at the death of his friend Reeves. Although he praises "Renegade Rocket"'s visuals, Law describes the overall episode as "a forerunner of effects-led films like Independence Day and its ilk – flashy, nice to look at but insubstantial and ultimately unfulfilling."
