= Launch =

Launch or launched may refer to:

== Involving vehicles ==
- Launch (boat), one of several different sorts of boat
  - Motor launch (naval), a small military vessel used by the Royal Navy
- Air launch, the practice of dropping an aircraft, rocket, or missile from a launch aircraft
- Rocket launch, first phase of a rocket flight
  - Space launch, first phase of a rocket flight that reaches space
- Ceremonial ship launching, when a vessel is slid into the water from a slipway

== Arts and media ==
- Launched (album), a 2000 album by Beatsteaks
- "The Launch" (song), 1999 song
- Launch (Dragon Ball), a character in Dragon Ball media
- The Launch, Canadian musical TV show
  - The Launch EP, the debut EP from the show
- Launch Media, creators of LAUNCH magazine and LAUNCH.com
- LAUNCHcast (now known as Yahoo! Music Radio), an Internet radio service

== Other uses ==
- LAUNCH (Innovation Challenge), a program sponsored by NASA, Nike, USAID and US Department of State
- Product launch, the introduction of a new product to market
- Soft launch, a preview release of a product or service to a limited audience prior to the general public

== See also ==
- Launcher (disambiguation)
- The Launching (1968 TV episode) episode of Captain Scarlet
