= Operation Time =

- Captain Scarlet and the Mysterons episode
- Episode no.: Episode 6
- Directed by: Ken Turner
- Written by: Richard Conway; Stephen J. Mattick
- Cinematography by: Julien Lugrin
- Editing by: John Beaton
- Production code: SCA 6
- Original air date: 17 November 1967

Guest character voices
- Gary Files (uncredited) as Dr Turner & 1st Medical Student; Martin King (uncredited) as Dr Theodore Magnus; Paul Maxwell as General J.F. Tiempo; Liz Morgan as Nurse; Charles Tingwell as Nurse Morgan; Jeremy Wilkin as Radiographer, 2nd Medical Student & Hospital Porter (Benson)

Episode chronology
← Previous "Point 783"	Next → "Renegade Rocket"

"Operation Time" is the sixth episode of Captain Scarlet and the Mysterons, a British Supermarionation television series created by Gerry and Sylvia Anderson and produced by their company Century 21 Productions. Written by Richard Conway and Stephen J. Mattick and directed by Ken Turner, it was first broadcast on 17 November 1967 on ATV Midlands.

Set in 2068, the series depicts a "war of nerves" between Earth and the Mysterons: a race of Martians with the power to create functioning copies of destroyed people or objects and use them to carry out acts of aggression against humanity. Earth is defended by a military organisation called Spectrum, whose top agent, Captain Scarlet, was killed by the Mysterons and replaced by a reconstruction that subsequently broke free of their control. Scarlet's double has a self-healing power that enables him to recover from injuries that would be fatal to anyone else, making him Spectrum's best asset in its fight against the Mysterons.

The plot of "Operation Time" sees the Mysterons threaten to "kill time", confusing Spectrum until the target is found to be a military general who is about to undergo experimental neurosurgery. The episode uncovers two weaknesses in the Mysterons that are explored further in "Spectrum Strikes Back".

== Plot ==
When the Mysterons cryptically threaten to "kill time", Colonel White sends the Spectrum captains to major cities to watch for potential targets. No promising intelligence surfaces until Captain Magenta discovers that the Commander of Western Region World Defence, General J.F. Tiempo – whose surname means "time" in Spanish – is at a clinic in England to undergo neurosurgery. Believing that Tiempo's life is in danger, White has him flown to Cloudbase with his surgeon, Dr Magnus, who insists that the operation – to be carried out with the aid of a pioneering medical device called the "cerebral pulsator" – go ahead as planned. White reluctantly agrees and allows him to use their sickbay as an operating theatre, with Cloudbase's medical officer Dr Fawn assisting Magnus and his subordinates.

Unknown to Spectrum, Magnus is a Mysteron reconstruction of the original doctor, who has been killed in a road accident engineered by Captain Black. During the operation, the reconstruction deliberately overruns the pulsator, inducing a seizure that kills his masked patient. Fawn removes the mask to reveal the face of Captain Scarlet, who unknown to Magnus had substituted for Tiempo. Exposed as a Mysteron agent, Magnus breaks out of the sickbay and flees to Cloudbase's generator room. He is cornered by Captain Blue and killed when he is knocked against a bare cable.

During this time, an abnormality has appeared on one of pre-operative radiographs taken of Tiempo's head: Magnus' hand, which was accidentally caught in the image, has blocked the X-rays and is registering as solid flesh. With Tiempo saved and Scarlet revived thanks to his retro-metabolic powers, White announces that Spectrum will develop technology to exploit the Mysterons' imperviousness to X-rays and vulnerability to electricity.

== Regular voice cast ==
- Ed Bishop as Captain Blue
- Gary Files as Captain Magenta
- Cy Grant as Lieutenant Green
- Donald Gray as Colonel White, Captain Black and the Mysterons
- Francis Matthews as Captain Scarlet
- Paul Maxwell as Captain Grey
- Charles Tingwell as Dr Fawn
- Jeremy Wilkin as Captain Ochre

== Production ==
Writers Richard Conway and Stephen J. Mattick named Magnus's colleague, Dr Turner, after the episode's director, Ken Turner. In the script, Conway and Mattick suggested that Wexham Park Hospital could be used as a location to shoot footage showing the development of Tiempo's radiographs. In the end, however, the episode was filmed entirely at Century 21's studios on the Slough Trading Estate.

Filming began on 20 February 1967 and was completed in two weeks. One of the medical students that appear in the opening scene was played by a puppet that was originally sculpted as the prototype of Captain Scarlet. The episode's incidental music was recorded in a four-and-a-half-hour studio session held on 14 May 1967, where it was performed by a group of 12 instrumentalists conducted by series composer Barry Gray. The music for "Renegade Rocket" was recorded during the same session.

"Operation Time" features voice actor Gary Files' first contributions to Captain Scarlet. Files was unavailable during the production of the series' earlier episodes because he was voicing characters in the film Thunderbird 6, for which he had been cast as a "try-out" for Captain Scarlet.

== Reception ==
Andrew Pixley and Julie Rogers of Starburst magazine noted the "cryptic" nature of the Mysterons' threat to "kill time", humorously remarking that it could "[suggest] they'll be passing a few hours playing cards or watching Oprah." They also considered the "rather graphic" electrocution of the reconstructed Magnus to be one of the series' more violent moments.

In his book Spectrum is Indestructible, Fred McNamara gave "Operation Time" a broadly positive review. Noting that it "expands on the mythology of the Mysterons", he praised the episode for its "precise delivery [...] pushing the world of Captain Scarlet to new levels whilst also acting as a confident episode in its own right, with a clear beginning and end." He criticised some elements of the story, calling Magenta's solving of the Mysteron riddle "as frustrating as it is hilarious" given that while other Spectrum captains have been posted to major cities, Magenta makes the connection to Tiempo from a newspaper on Cloudbase. McNamara also expressed dissatisfaction with the fact that nothing of the other captains' field assignments is shown, writing that his was "probably due to the limited running time" and format constraints. In the episode's favour, he praised the characterisation of Captain Black and Dr Magnus – describing the former as "deliciously evil" while hunting down the original Magnus, and latter unusually well developed for a Mysteron victim. He also commended Turner's direction, calling the car chase "fantastically executed in terms of pace and its visuals" and noting that the regular use of close-ups gives the episode a "claustrophobic" feel. In a later article, he ranked "Operation Time" among the best episodes of Captain Scarlet, finding it superior to its follow-up, "Spectrum Strikes Back". Comparing the episode to a "sci-fi medical drama-thriller", he praised its "quietly tense, character-driven" story and the "memorable" Magnus, who "[offers] us an intriguing insight into how temperamental Mysteron agents can become."
