= Captain Scarlet vs. the Mysterons =

1981 American television film

- Home video release cover
- Based on: Captain Scarlet and the Mysterons by Gerry and Sylvia Anderson
- Developed by: Robert Mandell
- Voices of: Francis Matthews; Ed Bishop; Cy Grant; Donald Gray
- Country of origin: United States
- Original language: English

Production
- Running time: 96 minutes
- Production company: ITC Entertainment

Original release
- Release: 1981

Related
- Revenge of the Mysterons from Mars

Captain Scarlet vs. the Mysterons is a 1981 television film based on the 1960s British puppet TV series Captain Scarlet and the Mysterons created by Gerry and Sylvia Anderson. Produced by the New York office of the series' distributor, ITC Entertainment, the film is a compilation of the Captain Scarlet episodes "The Mysterons", "Winged Assassin", "Seek and Destroy" and "Attack on Cloudbase". It follows an earlier Captain Scarlet compilation, Revenge of the Mysterons from Mars.

Set in 2068, the original series depicts a "war of nerves" between Earth and the Mysterons: a race of Martians with the power to create functioning copies of destroyed people or objects and use them to carry out acts of aggression against humanity. Earth is defended by a military organisation called Spectrum, whose top agent, Captain Scarlet, was killed by the Mysterons and replaced by a reconstruction that subsequently broke free of their control. Scarlet's double has a self-healing power that enables him to recover from injuries that would be fatal to anyone else, making him Spectrum's best asset in its fight against the Mysterons.

== Plot ==
Astronauts on a mission to Mars attack the city of the Mysterons, a race of aliens with the ability to create duplicates of beings and objects. In revenge, the Mysterons declare war on humanity.

Earth is defended by Spectrum, a worldwide security organisation. The Mysterons attempt to assassinate the World President using a double of Captain Scarlet, a Spectrum agent they have murdered. The double is defeated, after which it breaks free of Mysteron control and remains loyal to Spectrum ("The Mysterons"). However, the Mysterons succeed in their efforts to assassinate the Director General of the United Asian Republic ("Winged Assassin").

Scarlet, Captain Blue and Destiny Angel come under attack from a trio of reconstructed Spectrum Angel fighters but are saved by the rest of the Angel squadron ("Seek and Destroy"). Later, the Mysterons launch an assault on Cloudbase, Spectrum's airborne headquarters, using a fleet of armed flying saucers. Cloudbase is destroyed, but the Mysterons ultimately decide to show mercy: using their extraordinary powers to reverse time, they take the base back to a point prior to the attack, leaving it intact ("Attack on Cloudbase").

== Voice cast ==
- Sylvia Anderson as Melody Angel
- Ed Bishop as Captain Blue
- Gary Files as Captain Magenta
- Cy Grant as Lieutenant Green
- Donald Gray as Colonel White, Captain Black and the Mysterons
- Janna Hill as Symphony Angel
- Martin King as DT-19 Co-Pilot
- Francis Matthews as Captain Scarlet
- Paul Maxwell as World President, Captain Grey, DT-19 Pilot and Fire Chief
- Neil McCallum as London Airport chief
- Liz Morgan as Destiny Angel and Rhapsody Angel
- Charles Tingwell as Captain Brown, Lieutenant Dean, Dr Fawn, Spectrum Agent 042, Air Traffic Controller and Mr Fairfield
- Jeremy Wilkin as the original Captain Black, Garage Attendant, Director General, Director General's Double and Jackson

== Production ==
Created by the New York office of ITC Entertainment, Captain Scarlet vs. the Mysterons was one of several TV film re-workings of Anderson series designed to renew overseas interest in these productions and promote syndication sales in the United States. The films were collectively titled "Super Space Theater". In the case of Captain Scarlet vs. the Mysterons, the re-editing of the source material included the insertion of a new animated title sequence, updated special effects, new synthesised music and additional Mysteron voices supplied by an American actor.

== Release and reception ==
The film's first UK home video release, by Precision Video, was a LaserDisc exclusive. In 1986, the film was released on VHS by Channel 5 Video.

The film was neither a critical nor commercial success. It was also disliked by Gerry Anderson, who was not consulted on the new production. Fan reviews were also negative; however, the Video Movie Guide 1996 gives the film a rating of three-and-a-half stars out of four.

Changes to the ending of "Attack on Cloudbase" were widely criticised. After the destruction of Cloudbase (as seen in the original TV episode), the Mysterons reverse time and restore the base while stating their intention to spare humanity; the voice-over is accompanied by a shot of a computer-animated pyramid. This sequence implies that the attack on Cloudbase really happened, whereas in the original episode, it is a nightmare dreamt by an unconscious Symphony Angel. According to Fred McNamara, "Attack on Cloudbase" was "unforgivably butchered" by these alterations.

Noting that the last episode of the original Captain Scarlet ("The Inquisition") did not provide a resolution to the conflict between Earth and Mars, John Peel suggests that the material from "Attack on Cloudbase" was changed to give the series storyline a more satisfactory conclusion. He is negative in his assessment of the film: "The grafting of the new ending isn't too well done, and the whole thing looks totally faked."
