= Expo 2068 =

- Captain Scarlet and the Mysterons episode
- Episode no.: Episode 28
- Directed by: Leo Eaton
- Written by: Shane Rimmer
- Editing by: Harry MacDonald
- Production code: SCA 29
- Original air date: 26 March 1968

Guest character voices
- Gary Files as the transporter driver and the lumberjack; Martin King as the security captain and the helicopter operator; Neil McCallum (uncredited) as Raynor; Jeremy Wilkin as Dr Sommers

Episode chronology
← Previous "Place of Angels"	Next → "The Launching"

"Expo 2068" is the 28th episode of Captain Scarlet and the Mysterons, a British Supermarionation television series created by Gerry and Sylvia Anderson and filmed by their production company Century 21 Productions. Written by Shane Rimmer and directed by Leo Eaton, it was first broadcast on 26 March 1968 on ATV Midlands.

Set in 2068, the series depicts a "war of nerves" between Earth and the Mysterons: a hostile race of Martians with the power to create functioning copies of destroyed people or objects and use them to carry out acts of aggression against humanity. Earth is defended by a military organisation called Spectrum, whose top agent, Captain Scarlet, was murdered by the Mysterons and replaced by a reconstruction that later broke free of their control. Scarlet's double has a self-healing power that enables him to recover from injuries that would be fatal to anyone else, making him Spectrum's best asset in its fight against the Mysterons.

In "Expo 2068", the Mysterons steal a nuclear reactor as part of a plot to devastate the Atlantic Seaboard of North America.

== Plot ==
In Quebec, Canada, a nuclear reactor is being shipped to the Manicougan Power Complex by transporter truck. Captain Black switches a road sign to divert the driver onto an unfinished bridge, sending the transporter crashing into a canyon. The Mysterons reconstruct the driver, the transporter and the reactor to carry out their latest threat: to bring devastation to the Atlantic Seaboard of North America and thus "deal a heavy blow to the prestige of the world".

Elsewhere, a fleet of the Seneca construction company's remote-controlled helicopters are ferrying building materials to the site of the upcoming world's fair, Expo 2068. Infiltrating the Seneca control tower, Black holds the helicopter operator at gunpoint, forcing him to divert one of the helicopters to a forest clearing. There, the reconstructed transporter driver loads the reactor into the helicopter's wooden cargo container. Shortly after the transfer he is discovered by a passing lumberjack, whom he shoots and leaves for dead before departing.

While tracking down the transporter in a Spectrum Pursuit Vehicle, Captains Scarlet and Blue come across the wounded lumberjack and have him taken to hospital. They find that the reactor's thermal safety valve has been removed and that without it, the reactor will overheat and explode. They resume their pursuit of the transporter and the driver, attempting to evade Spectrum, is killed when he accidentally crashes his vehicle. With the reactor nowhere to be found, Scarlet and Blue remember that the lumberjack kept muttering the word "Seneca", and speed to Expo 2068.

At the site, Black orders the operator to position the helicopter directly over the Expo tower. When Scarlet and Blue arrive, he tells the operator to crash the helicopter, but the operator refuses. Black shoots him, also hitting the controls and causing the helicopter to fly erratically. Putting on a jet pack, Scarlet flies up to the helicopter and uses a saw to cut his way into the cargo container, where he discovers that the reactor has reached critical temperature. Though briefly crushed by the reactor, Scarlet manages to stabilise it by disconnecting the external circuits. While this averts the disaster that the Mysterons intended, the helicopter crashes into the Expo tower and explodes, fatally injuring Scarlet. In the final scene, Blue flies Scarlet's body back to Cloudbase in anticipation of his recovery.

== Regular voice cast ==
- Ed Bishop as Captain Blue
- Cy Grant as Lieutenant Green
- Donald Gray as Colonel White, Captain Black and the Mysterons
- Francis Matthews as Captain Scarlet
- Liz Morgan as Destiny Angel

== Production ==
"Expo 2068" was filmed between October and November 1967 on Century 21 Studios' Stage 4. It was the last episode of Captain Scarlet to be shot on this stage; the next production to go before the Stage 4 unit was "The Most Special Agent", the first episode of Joe 90. The miniature models of the transporter truck and nuclear reactor were originally built for "Big Ben Strikes Again", in which the Mysterons hi-jack an atomic device in an attempt to obliterate London.

The script included a number of scenes that were shortened or removed to prevent the episode from over-running. One of the deleted scenes shows Scarlet and Blue obtaining their SPV (stated to be number 442) from a village shop whose owner is shown dressed in nightclothes and a baseball cap. Two expository scenes – one explaining the purpose of the nuclear reactor, the other the history of the Manicougan Power Complex – were also removed, and some of Blue's dialogue in the final scene was cut. The script also clarified the Mysterons' objectives, with Colonel White (voiced by Donald Gray) realising that the aliens intend to crash the reactor into the Expo 2068 site, triggering a nuclear explosion. This line of dialogue was deleted, causing the finished episode to imply that the actual target is the Manicougan Power Complex. Shane Rimmer's script described Expo 2068 as "equivalent to our World's Fair but on an enormous scale".

The episode's incidental music was the last to be produced for Captain Scarlet. It was recorded during a four-hour studio session held on 3 December 1967, where it was performed by an ensemble of 14 instrumentalists. The music for "Attack on Cloudbase" had been recorded earlier in the session. The Captain Scarlet soundtrack CD release includes a piece from "Expo 2068" titled "The Reactor".

== Reception ==
Shane M. Dallmann of Video Watchdog magazine calls "Expo 2068" a "standout episode – and not just from a dramatic standpoint". Though unimpressed by the miniature model of the Seneca helicopter's cargo container, he remarks that the scene of Scarlet sawing his way inside "reveals an amazing level of concentration, skill and dexterity behind the camera."

Writer Fred McNamara praises the climax, calling it "one of the most satisfying action set pieces" of the series and commenting that the scenes of Scarlet inside the container demonstrate some "tricky marionette manoeuvring" and "exquisite model work". Also commending the overall episode, which he regards as one of Captain Scarlet's "most energetic" later instalments, he writes that Rimmer makes good use of the "well-worn plot device" of a stolen nuclear reactor and that the plot strikes an optimistic note in "[celebrating] the industrialised world of 2068". He does, however, consider the non‑explosion of the original reactor at the start of the episode to be "a rather gaping plot hole", arguing that the crash of the transporter with the reactor on board should have caused widespread destruction and that this alone would have fulfilled the Mysterons' objective of devastating the Atlantic Seaboard.

Andrew Pixley and Julie Rogers of Starburst magazine consider the scene of Scarlet being crushed by the reactor to be one of the series' most violent moments.
