= The Launching =

- Captain Scarlet and the Mysterons episode
- Episode no.: Episode 29
- Directed by: Brian Burgess
- Written by: Peter Curran; David Williams
- Cinematography by: Ted Catford
- Editing by: John Beaton
- Production code: SCA 16
- Original air date: 2 April 1968

Guest character voices
- Sylvia Anderson as the Trans-Pacific Vice President's Wife; Gary Files as Mervin Brand; David Healy as President Roberts; Martin King as the Trans-Pacific Shipping Corporation Vice President; Jeremy Wilkin as the Tribune controller

Episode chronology
← Previous "Expo 2068"	Next → "Codename Europa"

"The Launching" is the 29th episode of Captain Scarlet and the Mysterons, a British Supermarionation television series created by Gerry and Sylvia Anderson and filmed by their production company Century 21 Productions. Written by Peter Curran and David Williams and directed by Brian Burgess, it was first broadcast on 2 April 1968 on ATV Midlands.

Set in 2068, the series depicts a "war of nerves" between Earth and the Mysterons: a race of Martians with the power to create functioning copies of destroyed people or objects and use them to carry out acts of aggression against humanity. Earth is defended by a military organisation called Spectrum, whose top agent, Captain Scarlet, was killed by the Mysterons and replaced by a reconstruction that subsequently broke free of their control. Scarlet's double has a self-healing power that enables him to recover from injuries that would be fatal to anyone else, making him Spectrum's best asset in its fight against the Mysterons.

In "The Launching", Spectrum is mobilised to protect Roberts, the President of the United States, from assassination by the Mysterons. However, as the Mysterons' self-imposed deadline looms, Scarlet realises that Spectrum has misinterpreted the threat.

== Plot ==
The Mysterons vow to "destroy President Roberts" within 12 hours. Spectrum interprets this as a threat against President Roberts of the United States. On Cloudbase, Colonel White assigns Captains Scarlet, Blue and Ochre to the presidential residence to protect Roberts. Meanwhile, the Angel squadron, led by Symphony Angel, is launched to patrol the surrounding airspace.

Elsewhere, reporter Mervin Brand of the Tribune newspaper is flying to the residence to attend the President's news conference. He is killed when his jet crashes after being caught in a thunderstorm and struck by lightning. Later, Mysteron reconstructions of Brand and the jet are intercepted by the Angels, who force Brand to land. Unaware of Brand's true nature, the Angels allow him to complete his journey by road.

At the residence, Roberts agrees to Scarlet's security measures but insists that the conference go ahead as planned. One hour before the Mysteron deadline, Brand pulls up outside the residence in a car. However, rather than crash Blue and Ochre's security checkpoint, he suddenly speeds away, almost running over the officers in the process. The conference ends without further incident and Roberts, thinking the danger has passed, asks Scarlet if he can attend the launching of the Trans-Pacific Shipping Corporation's new atomic-powered liner. When the President explains that the ship is to be christened "President Roberts", Scarlet realises that Spectrum is protecting the wrong target and races to the nearby docks in a Spectrum Patrol Car.

At the docks, Brand infiltrates a private box and uses the Mysteron influence to transform the sacrificial bottle of champagne into a bomb. Just before the bottle is released, Scarlet arrives and alerts the spectators to the sabotage. Brand pulls a gun on Scarlet but the officer shoots him first. The docks are evacuated, but Brand is still alive and releases the bottle. However, it falls short of President Roberts' bow and swings back into the box, where it explodes and obliterates both Brand and Scarlet, though "President Roberts" is now safe.

A week later, Roberts believes Scarlet to be dead, but is amazed when the revived captain joins Blue in his office.

== Regular voice cast ==
- Ed Bishop as Captain Blue
- Cy Grant as Lieutenant Green
- Donald Gray as Colonel White, Captain Black and the Mysterons
- Janna Hill as Symphony Angel
- Lian-Shin Yang as Harmony Angel
- Francis Matthews as Captain Scarlet
- Liz Morgan as Destiny Angel
- Jeremy Wilkin as Captain Ochre

== Production ==
"The Launching" was originally filmed on Century 21 Studios' Stage 3 between May and June 1967. A reshoot was conducted on the same stage that October after Century 21 learnt that the Chicago Tribune, the character Mervin Brand's employer, shared its name with a real-life newspaper. To avoid trademark infringement, all verbal and visual references to the publication were shortened to "Tribune", which involved re-filming all of the miniature model shots of Brand's plane, a radio conversation between Brand and the Angels in the air and a face-to-face conversation between Brand and Harmony Angel on the ground. Scenes set inside President Roberts' residence were also re-shot, possibly to include a more stylised version of the presidential seal. The reshoot, which was completed while "Expo 2068" was being filmed on Stage 4, made the production of "The Launching" one of the most difficult of all Captain Scarlet episodes.

Footage cut from the completed episode includes a short scene in which Roberts is said to come from the same town as Symphony Angel. After appearing in the reshoot, the puppet that plays Roberts ("revamp puppet" number 19) was removed from Century 21's pool of guest marionettes and prepared for its regular role as Sam Loover in the following Supermarionation series Joe 90. A duplicate of the puppet was created to appear as Colgan in the Captain Scarlet series finale "The Inquisition".

The studio model of the presidential residence was made from the central part of the Creighton-Ward Mansion model from Thunderbirds. The Tribune Building was a modification of a model that had first appeared in "Big Ben Strikes Again". Some of the episode's incidental music was originally composed for Thunderbirds, Stingray and Fireball XL5. New incidental music was recorded on 23 July 1967 at composer Barry Gray's private studio, where it was performed by a four-member band. Music for "Lunarville 7" was recorded on the same day.

"The Launching" is the only episode of Captain Scarlet for which Chinese actress Lian-Shin Yang provided the voice of Harmony Angel. In earlier episodes the character had been voiced by Liz Morgan, who also voiced Destiny and Rhapsody Angels. Although Lian-Shin was a credited member of the voice cast for the last 20 episodes of Captain Scarlet, she voiced no characters after "The Launching", which is the last episode of the series to feature Harmony Angel in a speaking capacity.

== Broadcast and reception ==
"The Launching" was first transmitted on 2 April 1968 on ATV Midlands. On 28 November 1969, shortly after the introduction of regular colour broadcasting in the UK, it was transmitted in colour on Granada Television.

=== Critical response ===
Shane M. Dallmann of Video Watchdog magazine calls the episode "particularly entertaining ... with a most satisfying last-second cliffhanger resolution".

In a negative review of the episode, writer Fred McNamara describes "The Launching" as well paced but also "anticlimactic" and suffering from a "conspicuous lack of genuine plot". He calls the plot twist "flatly" delivered, stating that the reveal of the Mysterons' true target "goes for a bang but has little impact, whilst watching the episode back only shows how mundane the whole affair winds up being." He adds that Spectrum's focus on protecting the wrong target dampens the tension, also opining that "the few elements that make 'The Launching' worth watching bear little relation to the episode's plot itself." Besides questioning the Mervin Brand doppelganger's decision to linger outside the presidential residence when his actual objective is the ocean liner, McNamara also argues that the brief appearance of President Roberts herself fails to "convey the majesty of the craft". However, he praises the scene of the original Brand's death and reconstruction, describing it as "evocative" and "Gothic", and states that the use of a fictional US president as a guest character leads to some "welcome world-building" on the part of the scriptwriters.
