= Codename Europa =

- Captain Scarlet and the Mysterons episode
- Episode no.: Episode 30
- Directed by: Alan Perry
- Written by: David Lee
- Cinematography by: Julien Lugrin
- Editing by: John Beaton
- Production code: SCA 25
- Original air date: 21 March 1968

Guest character voices
- Gary Files as President Olafson; Martin King as 1st and 2nd Vandon Base Guards; Neil McCallum (uncredited) as Professor Carney and a security guard

Episode chronology
← Previous "The Launching"	Next → "Attack on Cloudbase"

"Codename Europa" is the 30th episode of Captain Scarlet and the Mysterons, a British Supermarionation television series created by Gerry and Sylvia Anderson and filmed by their production company Century 21 Productions. Written by David Lee and directed by Alan Perry, it was first broadcast on 21 March 1968 on Granada Television.

Set in 2068, the series depicts a "war of nerves" between Earth and the Mysterons: a race of Martians with the power to create functioning copies of destroyed people or objects and use them to carry out acts of aggression against humanity. Earth is defended by a military organisation called Spectrum, whose top agent, Captain Scarlet, was killed by the Mysterons and replaced by a reconstruction that subsequently broke free of their control. Scarlet's double has a self-healing power that enables him to recover from injuries that would be fatal to anyone else, making him Spectrum's best asset in its fight against the Mysterons.

In "Codename Europa", the Mysterons kill and reconstruct an electronics professor as part of a plot to assassinate the Triumvirate of Europe, the three most powerful politicians on Earth after the World President.

== Plot ==
The Mysterons vow to assassinate the Triumvirate of Europe, made up of presidents Conrad Olafson, John Henderson and Joseph Meccini – the three most powerful politicians on Earth after the World President. Travelling to the rural bungalow of electronics professor Gabriel Carney, Captain Black uses a sniper rifle to shoot dead the professor, who is then reconstructed by the Mysterons to carry out their threat.

To protect the Triumvirate, Spectrum moves each member to a different secure facility. Driving to Vandon Maximum Security Base, which contains Olafson, the reconstructed Carney sets up a loudspeaker system to blare out sounds of machine guns and tanks to fool the guards into thinking that the base is under attack. As the Angel squadron bomb the surrounding forest, Carney cuts through the base's wire fence and drops a bomb in an air vent that he thinks leads to Olafson's underground quarters, not knowing that the vent is actually a dummy. The resulting explosion destroys the base above ground but leaves Olafson untouched.

Some time later, the body of the original Carney is discovered. When word reaches Cloudbase that a second Carney has been spotted, Colonel White realises that the professor has been taken over by the Mysterons and dispatches Captains Scarlet and Blue to Carney's home, where the officers discover a mysterious note reading "123 OHM". Scarlet deduces that this is Carney's timetable: he targeted President Olafson first, so Henderson is second and Meccini third.

Returning to their Spectrum Pursuit Vehicle, Scarlet and Blue locate Carney's car and chase the professor as he speeds to the facility containing Henderson. Carney activates an electronic device that disrupts the SPV's viewing monitor, forcing Scarlet and Blue off the road. Reaching the facility, Scarlet and Blue find themselves and Henderson cut off after Carney flies a specially-adapted toy plane overhead, jamming radio transmissions in the area, and then uses a grenade to blow up the electricity supply, plunging the facility into darkness. Carney dons night-vision goggles to avoid the disorientated security guards and makes his way to Henderson's quarters armed with a gun. However, as he enters the room, he fails to spot a tripwire placed by Scarlet and Blue, stumbles over it and is shot dead by Scarlet. Scarlet and Blue note the irony of an expert being defeated by one of the most basic security measures.

== Regular voice cast ==
- Ed Bishop as Captain Blue
- Cy Grant as Lieutenant Green
- Donald Gray as Colonel White, Captain Black and the Mysterons
- Francis Matthews as Captain Scarlet
- Liz Morgan as Destiny Angel
- Jeremy Wilkin as Captain Ochre

== Production ==
David Lee's script indicated that the human Professor Carney designed the security systems at Spectrum's maximum-security facilities. The script also included unfilmed scenes in which Carney's reconstruction disposes of the original's body by using a remote-controlled lawn mower to dump it in a pond. "Codename Europa" is the only episode of Captain Scarlet in which supporting voice actor Neil McCallum played a Mysteron agent.

The puppet that plays Carney first appeared as Captain Brown in "The Mysterons". It was fitted with a specially-sculpted "grimacing" head for the scene in which the character is gunned down by Captain Black. Some of the props seen inside Carney's bungalow were originally made for the films Thunderbirds Are Go (1966) and Thunderbird 6 (1968).

== Reception ==
Writer Fred McNamara describes "Codename Europa" as "a joy" and one of the series' "most underrated" episodes. Aspects praised by McNamara include the "ambitious" use of three Mysteron targets, McCallum's "superbly sadistic" voice for Carney, and the episode's "entertaining package of tense, atmospheric action" – the Mysteron agent's unusual tactics giving the story a "genuinely unnerving edge". He considers the episode a departure from Captain Scarlet norms on account of its "anti-tech stance", observing that Carney's eccentricity conveys a "disenchantment with the routine techno-wonders that make up Captain Scarlet's world". McNamara also notes that Spectrum's victory over the Mysterons, despite being repeatedly outfoxed by their agent, is in contrast with other episodes where the organisation seems to have the tactical advantage yet is ultimately defeated. McNamara's main criticism of the episode lies in its ending: he argues that Carney's sudden demise shows that the episode has "too much story" for its running time, a suggestion supported by the fact that the loss of Carney prevents the Mysterons from targeting the last of the triumvirate, President Meccini.
