= Attack on Cloudbase =

- Captain Scarlet and the Mysterons episode
- The Mysteron fleet fires on Cloudbase. For reasons of economy, miniature models appear only in the foreground of the shot; the dots behind them are light bulbs fitted to the backdrop to make the fleet appear larger. The spacecraft were modelled on classic flying saucers.
- Episode no.: Episode 31
- Directed by: Ken Turner
- Written by: Tony Barwick
- Cinematography by: Ted Catford
- Editing by: Bob Dearberg
- Production code: SCA 30
- Original air date: 5 May 1968

Episode chronology
← Previous "Codename Europa"	Next → "The Inquisition"

"Attack on Cloudbase" is the 31st episode of Captain Scarlet and the Mysterons, a British Supermarionation television series created by Gerry and Sylvia Anderson and filmed by their production company Century 21 Productions for ITC Entertainment. The series' penultimate episode, it was written by Tony Barwick and first broadcast on 5 May 1968 on ATV London.

Set in 2068, the series depicts a "war of nerves" between Earth and the Mysterons: a hostile race of Martians with the ability to create functioning copies of destroyed people or objects and use these reconstructions to carry out specific acts of aggression against humanity. Earth is defended by a military organisation called Spectrum, whose top agent, Captain Scarlet, was murdered by the Mysterons and replaced with a reconstruction that later broke free of their control. The double of Scarlet has powers of self-repair that enable him to recover from injuries that would be fatal to any other person, which make him Spectrum's greatest asset in its fight against the Mysterons.

"Attack on Cloudbase" begins with Spectrum fighter pilot Symphony Angel being forced to eject into the Sahara when her aircraft is damaged. Later, a fleet of Mysteron spacecraft enter Earth's atmosphere and launch a devastating assault on Spectrum's airborne headquarters, Cloudbase. Filmed in late 1967, the episode underwent a number of script changes prior to shooting. Gerry Anderson chose Ken Turner to direct due to its unusual nature of the story. The episode presented Century 21's special effects team with several technical challenges, including a scene in which a miniature Angel aircraft overflies the puppet of Symphony Angel in the same shot. For the attack sequence, only a small number of spacecraft models were made; flashing light bulbs were placed in the backdrop as a cost-effective way to create the illusion of a larger fleet. Series composer Barry Gray wrote a full score after Anderson decided that none of the incidental music in Century 21's library suited the episode's grim tone.

Critical response to "Attack on Cloudbase" has been mostly positive, with one commentator naming it the best episode of Captain Scarlet. Some criticism has been directed at its ending plot twist. Anderson, who likened the episode to a black comedy, praised Barwick for his "humanised" writing of the puppet characters. In 1980, the New York office of ITC re-edited the episode to form the ending part of the Captain Scarlet compilation film Captain Scarlet vs. the Mysterons.

== Plot ==
While on patrol over the Sahara, Spectrum fighter pilot Symphony Angel is forced to eject after the tail of her aircraft mysteriously explodes. On the ground, she is overcome by heat stroke and passes out. In a transmission from Mars, the Mysterons warn Spectrum that they intend to destroy its airborne headquarters, Cloudbase.

Cloudbase is placed on red alert and isolated from all external contact. Destiny Angel has been launched to search for Symphony but is recalled by base commander Colonel White in view of the Mysteron threat. This leads to a heated exchange between White and Captain Blue, who admits that he has romantic feelings for Symphony. However, White refuses to let Blue join the ground search.

Night falls, and Captain Magenta detects a large object on Cloudbase's radar. Rhapsody Angel is launched to investigate and discovers a spinning Mysteron spacecraft that destroys her fighter in mid-air. When more craft arrive, Captain Scarlet volunteers to challenge the Mysterons in Destiny's place. However, his fighter is damaged and he crash-lands on the Cloudbase flight deck, seriously injured.

As the Mysterons open fire on Cloudbase, medical officer Dr Fawn is killed. Posing as his assistant, Mysteron agent Captain Black reports that Scarlet's powers of self-repair have failed him and that he is therefore permanently dead. The Mysteron attack intensifies, resulting in the deaths of everyone else on board except White, Blue and Lieutenant Green. As the stricken Cloudbase loses altitude, another explosion kills Green and cripples Blue. Resolving to go down with his command, White stands to attention and salutes, as Cloudbase crashes to Earth.

Suddenly, Symphony wakes up in the desert facing Scarlet and Blue, who are part of the ground forces that have been sent to rescue her; Symphony merely dreamt the attack on Cloudbase in a nightmare brought on by the desert heat.

== Regular voice cast ==
- Ed Bishop as Captain Blue
- Gary Files as Captain Magenta
- Cy Grant as Lieutenant Green
- Donald Gray as Colonel White and the Mysterons
- Janna Hill as Symphony Angel
- Francis Matthews as Captain Scarlet
- Liz Morgan as Destiny Angel and Rhapsody Angel

== Production ==
"Attack on Cloudbase" was one of the last Captain Scarlet episodes to be filmed. It was directed by Ken Turner, whose style Gerry Anderson thought best suited the episode's "more bizarre" tone. As originally scripted, Captain Magenta's role was to be played by a Spectrum officer codenamed Captain Sienna. This character was replaced with Magenta to avoid the cost of making a new sienna-coloured Spectrum uniform.

Filming began on 25 October 1967, less than three weeks before Joe 90, Century 21's next series, entered production. To avoid overworking the designers, who were busy preparing for the new series, the episode was devised as a bottle show to reduce the number of puppets and sets required: unique among Captain Scarlet episodes, it features no characters other than the regular cast and was filmed mostly on existing sets. The previously unseen Cloudbase Radar Room was created using walls and props that were originally built for Thunderbirds Are Go (1966) and earlier Captain Scarlet episodes. "Attack on Cloudbase" is also one of only two episodes (the other being "Flight to Atlantica") to feature all of the regular cast, though not all of them have speaking parts.

The scenes of Symphony Angel in the desert and the Mysterons attacking Cloudbase presented a number of challenges for Century 21's special effects department, headed by Derek Meddings. A scene in which Symphony looks up as Destiny Angel's fighter flies past her required close collaboration between the puppet operators and the effects crew, the former keeping the puppet under control while the latter moved the scale model across the set. The Mysteron spacecraft were modelled on "flying saucer" UFOs commonly reported during the 1960s. To make the spacecraft appear to spin in the moonlight, Meddings added "veins" to each model to reflect the lighting in the studio. Due to a shortage of model operators on set, the models were flown only in the foreground; flashing light bulbs were fitted to the backdrop to give the impression of a larger fleet.

Actress Liz Morgan, who voiced Destiny and Rhapsody Angels, was overcome with emotion at one point during the dialogue-recording session: "It was a moment when Destiny was very worried about Captain Scarlet and she was making impassioned pleas for him. Well, I started to cry, and immediately a voice came down from the recording booth and [producer] Reg Hill, who was directing that particular week, said, 'No, Liz, love. Do it again, love. Puppets don't cry!'" Just before Cloudbase hits the ground, Colonel White is shown standing to attention and saluting in a spiralling freeze-frame shot. Anderson based this on maritime tradition, stating that he wanted the audience to see White "[going] down like the captain of a big ship."

"Attack on Cloudbase" is one of only a few Captain Scarlet episodes to have its own score instead of using incidental music recycled from a track library. Series composer Barry Gray devised the score after Anderson decided that nothing in Century 21's musical archive suited the dark nature of the plot. Performed by a 14-member band, it was the penultimate score to be produced for Captain Scarlet and was recorded on 3 December 1967 in a four-hour studio session. The CD of the series soundtrack includes pieces from "Attack on Cloudbase" titled "Desert Symphony" and "The Mysterons Attack!"

== Reception ==
In a DVD audio commentary that he recorded for the episode, Anderson stated that although "Attack on Cloudbase" was intended to be humorous, he believed that the finished episode was more of a "black comedy". He praised the script, noting Blue's feelings for Symphony and his conflict with White as examples of Barwick's "humanisation" of the puppet characters. He also described Captain Magenta's comical commentary on the attack, which ends only with the character's death, as another "wonderful example of 'Barwickism'". Though acknowledging that dream sequences might seem clichéd, he defended the episode's use of a nightmare plot mechanism for its power to frighten, and then re-assure, the audience. He argued that the dark tone is lightened by the closing scene, which he said was written as there had to be "a sequence where everyone was happy together, and clearly no one had come to any grief", thus forming the "inevitable happy ending" to a tragic story.

James Stansfield of the website Den of Geek considers "Attack on Cloudbase" to be the best episode of Captain Scarlet. Describing the episode as highly entertaining even if "shocking and surprisingly bleak", he praises the writing and characterisation – in particular, the death of Rhapsody Angel and the conflict between Blue and White. However, he comments negatively on the dream plot twist as well as what he regards as a minor plot hole: for reasons that are unclear, the stranded Symphony throws away her helmet, thus making it impossible for Spectrum to contact her. Stansfield suggests that the nightmarish nature of the plot is implied long before it is confirmed in dialogue, suggesting that moments such as the death of the "indestructible" Scarlet, and Blue's lack of astonishment at the sudden appearance of Captain Black, serve as "hints ... that all might not be quite as it seems". In 2019, British magazine TV Years (a sister publication of TV Choice) listed the attack sequences as the 23rd‑greatest moment in TV science fiction, calling the episode "devastating" up until the plot twist.

Morgan Jeffery of Digital Spy calls the episode "thrilling" and "perhaps the highlight" of the series. However, he criticises the "lame, 'it was all a dream' ending", arguing that it is made more frustrating by the fact that the final episode, "The Inquisition", is a clip show that ends with the conflict between Earth and the Mysterons unresolved: "Cut the final few minutes from 'Attack on Cloudbase' and imagine what a finale that would have been!" Andrew Thomas of Dreamwatch magazine considers dream sequences an "appalling" narrative technique but describes the episode's scenes of destruction as "very well handled".

Martin Cater of Network Distributing judges the episode "dramatic" and "memorable" despite its dependence on a "cop-out" dream sequence. He compares it to the Fireball XL5 episode "A Day in the Life of a Space General" (1963), which features an "orgy of destruction with the convenient cop-out of a dream to act as a 'reset button'." Chris Drake and Graeme Bassett describe "Attack on Cloudbase" as "tense and exciting", stating that it is "guaranteed to keep the viewer guessing". Some commentators have questioned why no explanation is given for the explosion that brings down Symphony's fighter at the start of the episode.

The British Board of Film Classification certifies the episode U, noting that it contains "very mild fantasy" violence.

== 1980 re-edit ==
The New York office of ITC later re-edited the episode to serve as the concluding segment of the compilation film Captain Scarlet vs. the Mysterons (1980). This involved the creation of a new ending with computer-animated visual effects and a Mysteron voice-over (supplied by an American actor) implying that the destruction of Cloudbase really happened. However, in an act of mercy, the Mysterons use their powers to reverse time, leaving Cloudbase and its personnel intact. These changes were poorly received by fans of the original episode.
