= Revenge of the Mysterons from Mars =

1981 American television film

- Home video release cover
- Based on: Captain Scarlet and the Mysterons by Gerry & Sylvia Anderson
- Developed by: Robert Mandell
- Voices of: Francis Matthews; Ed Bishop; Cy Grant; Donald Gray
- Country of origin: United States
- Original language: English

Production
- Running time: 91 minutes
- Production company: ITC Entertainment

Original release
- Release: 1981

Related
- Captain Scarlet vs. the Mysterons

Revenge of the Mysterons from Mars is a 1981 television film based on the 1960s British puppet TV series Captain Scarlet and the Mysterons created by Gerry and Sylvia Anderson. Produced by the New York office of the series' distributor, ITC Entertainment, the film is a compilation of the Captain Scarlet episodes "Shadow of Fear", "Lunarville 7", "Crater 101" and "Dangerous Rendezvous".

Set in 2068, the original series depicts a "war of nerves" between Earth and the Mysterons: a race of Martians with the power to create functioning copies of destroyed people or objects and use them to carry out acts of aggression against humanity. Earth is defended by a military organisation called Spectrum, whose top agent, Captain Scarlet, was killed by the Mysterons and replaced by a reconstruction that subsequently broke free of their control. Scarlet's double has a self-healing power that enables him to recover from injuries that would be fatal to anyone else, making him Spectrum's best asset in its fight against the Mysterons.

Revenge of the Mysterons from Mars had its first home video release in either 1981 or January 1982. It was followed by another Captain Scarlet compilation, Captain Scarlet vs. the Mysterons. Revenge of the Mysterons from Mars was negatively received by fans of the original Captain Scarlet. In November 1988, it was broadcast as the second episode of the movie-mocking TV series Mystery Science Theater 3000.

== Plot ==
An attempt by Spectrum to survey Mars from space is threatened when the Mysterons murder an astronomer attached to the project and replace him with a doppelganger under their control. Captains Scarlet and Blue track down and kill the reconstruction, but not before it sabotages the mountain observatory that is due to receive the images from the Martian space probe. The observatory is destroyed and the images are lost ("Shadow of Fear").

After the Lunar Controller declares the Moon a neutral party in Earth's struggle with the Mysterons, Scarlet, Blue and Lieutenant Green are sent to lunar colony Lunarville 7 to follow up reports of an unidentified complex being built on the far side of the Moon. They discover that this is a Mysteron installation ("Lunarville 7").

After reporting back to Spectrum, Scarlet, Blue and Green return to the Moon to destroy the Mysteron facility. They successfully extract its pulsating crystal power source, thus disabling its reconstructive capability and allowing it to be permanently destroyed with a nuclear bomb ("Crater 101").

Back on Earth, Dr Kurnitz finds that the crystal pulsator can be adapted to enable direct communication with the Mysterons. Transmitting to Mars, Spectrum commander-in-chief Colonel White requests an end to the hostilities between humanity and the Mysterons ("Dangerous Rendezvous").

== Voice cast ==
- Sylvia Anderson as Linda Nolan and Receptionist
- Ed Bishop as Captain Blue
- Gary Files as Captain Magenta and Moon Shuttle Pilot
- Cy Grant as Lieutenant Green
- Donald Gray as Colonel White, Captain Black and the Mysterons
- David Healy as Lunar Controller and Frazer
- Martin King as Orson and SID
- Francis Matthews as Captain Scarlet
- Paul Maxwell as Captain Grey and Dr Breck
- Charles Tingwell as Dr Carter and Lieutenant Dean
- Jeremy Wilkin as Captain Ochre, Dr Angelini, Shroeder, Dr Kurnitz and human Captain Black

== Release and reception ==
Created by the New York office of ITC Entertainment, Revenge of the Mysterons from Mars was one of several TV film re-workings of Anderson series designed to renew overseas interest in these productions and promote syndication sales in the United States. The films were collectively titled "Super Space Theater".

Following its initial home video release by Precision Video, Revenge of the Mysterons from Mars had two later VHS releases: the first by Channel 5 Video in 1986, the second by PolyGram in 1992. It was also released on Betamax and LaserDisc.

Elliot's Guide to Films on Video (1993) rated the film one out of five stars, signifying "poor to bad". Fred McNamara considers the film "curiously titled" and "thematically" superior to Captain Scarlet vs. the Mysterons.

=== Mystery Science Theater 3000 ===
On 24 November 1988 (Thanksgiving in the United States), the film was broadcast as the second episode of the movie-mocking comedy series Mystery Science Theater 3000, transmitted by KTMA in Minneapolis. It formed the second half of a double feature with Invaders from the Deep, a compilation based on Stingray, which had been shown earlier that day as episode 1. Previously considered lost, the master tapes for episodes 1 and 2 were re-discovered in 2016 and made available for digital download to backers of MST3K's crowdfunded eleventh season.
