= Big Ben Strikes Again =

- Captain Scarlet and the Mysterons episode
- Episode no.: Episode 3
- Directed by: Brian Burgess
- Written by: Tony Barwick
- Cinematography by: Paddy Seale
- Editing by: John Beaton
- Production code: SCA 3
- Original air date: 13 October 1967

Guest character voices
- Martin King (uncredited) as 2nd Police Officer; Paul Maxwell as 1st Police Officer; Neil McCallum (uncredited) as 4th Police Officer; Charles Tingwell as Macey; Jeremy Wilkin as 3rd & 5th Police Officers and Radio DJ

Episode chronology
← Previous "Winged Assassin"	Next → "Manhunt"

"Big Ben Strikes Again" is the third episode of Captain Scarlet and the Mysterons, a British Supermarionation television series created by Gerry and Sylvia Anderson. Written by Tony Barwick and directed by Brian Burgess, it was first broadcast on 13 October 1967 on ATV Midlands.

Set in 2068, the series depicts a "war of nerves" between Earth and the Mysterons: a hostile race of Martians with the ability to create functioning copies of destroyed people or objects and use these reconstructions to carry out specific acts of aggression against humanity. Earth is defended by a military organisation called Spectrum, whose top agent, Captain Scarlet, was murdered by the Mysterons and replaced with a reconstruction that later broke free of their control. The double of Scarlet has powers of self-repair that enable him to recover from injuries that would be fatal to any other person, which make him Spectrum's best asset in its fight against the Mysterons.

In this episode, the Mysterons attempt to destroy London by hijacking a transporter truck and turning its cargo – a nuclear device – into a time bomb. Spectrum's key to locating the device before it detonates lies in solving the mystery of the truck driver's claim that he heard Big Ben strike 13 at midnight.

Along with the previous episode, "Big Ben Strikes Again" was postponed during the BBC's 2001 Captain Scarlet re-run after comparisons were drawn between the storyline and the attacks of September 11, 2001. The clip show series finale, "The Inquisition", features a flashback to this episode.

== Plot ==
The Mysterons announce that they intend to destroy London. Aided by Captain Black, they use their powers to seize control of a transporter truck carrying a nuclear device through the city. The transporter and its driver, Macey, are sealed inside Park View, an underground car park. Macey, who was knocked out during the hijack, wakes up not knowing where he is. Turning on his radio to hear Big Ben strike midnight, he is surprised to hear 13 chimes instead of 12. The Mysterons start the nuclear device's 12-hour detonation countdown then knock Macey out for a second time and dump him in a side street.

In response to the device's disappearance, Spectrum is put on red alert. Macey is found by Captain Scarlet and taken to Cloudbase to relate his ordeal to Colonel White. Although there are more than 2,000 car parks in London that match Macey's description of Park View, Captain Blue narrows these down to Park View and one other after remembering Macey's claim that Big Ben struck 13 and calculating that the car park must be within one mile of Big Ben.

With less than an hour to go before detonation, Scarlet and Blue fly to London, proceed to Park View in a Spectrum Pursuit Vehicle and locate the device. As the defusing procedure would take too long, White orders the captains to drive the transporter to its intended destination – a nearby construction site – and leave the device to detonate in a specially-prepared underground excavation. With just minutes to spare, Scarlet and Blue reach the site and Blue lowers the transporter, driven by Scarlet, into the excavation using a large elevator. Scarlet abandons the transporter and begins his ascent, but seconds later the device explodes, obliterating the elevator shaft. Scarlet is fatally injured but recovers thanks to his powers of accelerated healing.

Later, while dining at a restaurant with Scarlet, Melody Angel and Destiny Angel, Blue explains how he was able to work out the car park's approximate location and why Macey thought he heard Big Ben strike 13. In reality, Macey was hearing two sets of chimes: one on the air, the other on his radio. However, the former were delayed by the speed of sound, so the "thirteenth" chime was actually a repeat of the twelfth that had already sounded over the radio. Following this explanation, Scarlet decides to make 13 his "lucky number".

== Regular voice cast ==
- Sylvia Anderson as Melody Angel
- Ed Bishop as Captain Blue
- Cy Grant as Lieutenant Green
- Donald Gray as Colonel White and the Mysterons
- Francis Matthews as Captain Scarlet
- Paul Maxwell as Captain Grey
- Liz Morgan as Destiny Angel
- Jeremy Wilkin as Captain Ochre

== Production ==
The script included a number of short scenes that were ultimately unfilmed. Set immediately after Colonel White orders the red alert, these would have introduced Spectrum captains codenamed "Yellow" and "Purple" and shown Captain Scarlet resting in Cloudbase's "Room of Sleep", which is mentioned (but never seen) in later episodes. The script stated that this room contains "special couches" that enable users to condense a full night's sleep into one hour.

The episode's scale model work involved the construction of whole miniature streets, which was made possible by the higher budget per episode compared to Century 21's earlier productions. Special effects director Derek Meddings remembered the transporter hijacking scenes for their atmosphere. For stronger realism, the model sets were re-dressed several times to make the stolen transporter appear to cover more ground. The transporter model, which re-appears in "Expo 2068", was designed by Meddings' assistant, Mike Trim.

The incidental music was recorded on 16 April 1967 in a four-hour session at series composer Barry Gray's private studio, where it was performed by a 14-member ensemble. Music for the following episode, "Manhunt", was recorded on the same day. The tracks for "Big Ben Strikes Again" include a light jazz piece, "Until Midnight", which is heard playing on Macey's radio during the scene leading up to Big Ben's chimes.

== Broadcast and reception ==
When the series began a re-run on BBC Two in September 2001, "Big Ben Strikes Again" was originally due to be transmitted on 24 September as the third episode, matching the order of production. However, it was postponed due to similarities between the plot, which is about a stolen nuclear device, and the terrorist attacks of earlier that month. Around this time, the Captain Scarlet pages on the website of the series' distributor, Carlton, were briefly taken offline. "Big Ben Strikes Again" was ultimately broadcast on 5 November 2001 as the eighth episode of the run.

=== Critical response ===
Mike Fillis of Cult Times magazine considers "Big Ben Strikes Again" to be a highlight of the series, describing the episode's scale model work as "superb". Writing for What DVD magazine, Gary Russell cites the episode's opening act, which he says revolves around Macey's "paranoia", as an example of Captain Scarlet's relative maturity for a children's series as well as its "sense of darkness ... and real drama". Chris Bentley, author of Captain Scarlet: The Vault, describes Scarlet and Blue's race to the construction site as "fostering unbearable tension", which he believes to be heightened by Spectrum's defeat in the previous episode.

Writer Fred McNamara praises the episode, calling it one of the series' "most taut, nerve-chilling" instalments. He describes the first half as a "deft blend of atmosphere and model work", highlighting the depiction of night-time London (which he describes as a "model-maker's paradise"), the hijacking of the transporter truck ("downright thrilling") and Macey's exploration of the underground car park (a "sublime cocktail of lighting and direction"). Among his few criticisms are the expository closing scene, which he views as a "limp, dry aftermath to an otherwise brilliant episode – one that mixes dark atmospherics and full-blown action into an engrossing whole."

Media historian Nicholas J. Cull argues that "Big Ben Strikes Again", along with the later episodes "Treble Cross" and "Expo 2068", demonstrates Barwick's partiality to storylines about the dangers of nuclear technology. He views the episode's premise about stolen nuclear technology as an example of Barwick employing his "favourite [plot] device".
