= The Lambda Factor =

- Space: 1999 episode
- Episode no.: Series 2 Episode 17
- Directed by: Charles Crichton
- Written by: Terrance Dicks
- Editing by: Mike Campbell
- Production code: SPII 19
- Original air date: 23 December 1976

Guest appearances
- Deborah Fallender as Carolyn Powell; Jess Conrad as Mark Sanders; Antony Stamboulieh as George Crato; Michael Walker as Carl Renton; Gregory de Polnay as Pete Garforth; Lydia Lisle as Sally Martin; Lucinda Curtis as Tessa; Dallas Adams as Sam; Vic Armstrong as Recreation Room Security Guard

Episode chronology
← Previous "The Beta Cloud"	Next → "The Bringers of Wonder, Part 1"

"The Lambda Factor" is the 17th episode of the second series of Space: 1999 (and the 41st episode overall of the programme). The screenplay was written by Terrance Dicks; the director was Charles Crichton. The final shooting script is dated 6 August 1976, with amendments dated 2 September, 15 September, 27 September, 28 September, 29 September and 5 October 1976. Live action filming took place between 29 September and Friday 15 October 1976.

== Plot ==
Moonbase Alpha is plagued by intermittent disturbances. Commander Koenig keeps having nightmares in which the ghost of a woman accuses him of killing her. Meanwhile, technician Sally Martin, devastated over her broken engagement, is inventorying stores when she is crushed to death by a sourceless wind. Suspected of her murder are her ex-fiancé, Mark Sanders, and his new lover, Carolyn Powell. Powell comes under increased suspicion when she is found to have been experimenting with a device that can project pressure waves.

The Moon approaches a gaseous formation filled with electrically-charged particles. In the recreation room, Carl Renton, known for his bad luck, has won 17 games of chance in a row. His opponent accuses him of cheating and they come to blows. Elsewhere, the Eagle fleet is grounded by malfunctions. After speaking with frustrated engineer Pete Garforth, Captain Carter finds himself locked in the workshop. An atomic device starts up, threatening to explode until Maya, who happens to be passing, shapeshifts into a gorilla to break into the room and deactivate it.

Koenig tells Dr Russell the cause of his nightmares. Years earlier, he was part of a team that arrived at a space station to find its crew dead from an alien disease. To contain the infection, the station was quarantined – but Koenig's friend Sam, and Sam's fiancée Tessa, had already been exposed and were left to die. Back in the present, Sanders tells a distraught Powell that their relationship is over. Later, he is hit by a blast of air and his body pulped, while Powell watches.

Instruments detect electrical activity resembling "lambda" brainwaves. Russell identifies these as the lambda variant: a rare pattern known to parapsychologists. It is creating above-average psychic powers in most of Alpha's population. Three individuals – Renton, Garforth and Powell – demonstrate exceptional ability with the potential to harm others. Believed to include Martin and Sanders' killer, the three "sensitives" are placed in a force field strong enough to block out the variant. Powell is the only one who continues display paranormal ability, which she reveals by breaking out of the force field. She takes over the Command Center and psychically tortures the staff.

Sam and Tessa are now terrorising Koenig during his waking hours, leaving the commander catatonic. Using narcosynthesis, Russell revives Koenig and helps him come to terms with his repressed guilt. Koenig forgives himself and the spectres, created by his psi powers, disappear.

For the sensitives, the variant has amplified hidden aspects of the psyche. Renton's power allows him to manipulate gaming odds to his advantage; Garforth's exploits his fear of flying to compel him to sabotage the Eagles; and Powell's turns her feelings of inadequacy into a killing force.

Koenig, the only Alphan of equal paranormal strength, confronts Powell. As they engage in a wordless battle of wills, a vortex of wind fills the Command Center. Starved of negative emotions, Powell is defeated and her mind emptied; now as innocent as a newborn, she will have to grow up again. In space, the gaseous formation vanishes.

== Regular cast ==
- Martin Landau as Commander John Koenig
- Barbara Bain as Dr Helena Russell
- Catherine Schell as Maya
- Tony Anholt as Tony Verdeschi
- Nick Tate as Captain Alan Carter
- Zienia Merton as Sandra Benes

== Production ==
Prolific writer Terrance Dicks is best known for his long-term association with Doctor Who. In 1968, he joined the BBC programme as an assistant script editor during a period of transition; in 1970 he became script editor, holding this position for the entire five-year Jon Pertwee era. Through the 70s and 80s, he would still write for the series and pen a number of Doctor Who novels for Target Books. Dicks recalled being persuaded into meeting producer Fred Freiberger by his agent. This meeting was peculiar as Dicks had no knowledge of the programme and Freiberger initially mistook Dicks for another writer. After conceiving this supernatural science-fiction tale, Dicks telephoned Freiberger, who approved the idea on the spot. Dicks duly submitted his script and received a cheque—but not one word of feedback or an invitation to the shoot. It was not until years later that he discovered it had been produced.

Minor changes were made during the amendments: (1) Initially described as a yellow cloud, the revisions transformed the space phenomenon into a stylised whirling mass; (2) Sally was described as blonde and beautiful, where Carolyn was dark and unconventional, possessing a 'smouldering sensuality'; (3) Bully George Crato was originally named 'Harry Garth'. The gambling game was described as space-age craps, with an automated dice-shaker; (4) Several stage directions indicated Carolyn initially felt remorse and guilt for her actions. One scene cut from the final print would have seen her at a mirror, pleading with her reflection for help.

After working with lions, panthers and falcons, the crew undeniably asserted the most troublesome animal performer was the chimpanzee featured in this instalment. Zienia Merton recalled how the animal refused to take direction, first fascinated by the actors standing motionless, then distracted by the TV monitor and flashing lights on her desk. When dropping to the floor, it latched onto her leg in an inappropriately affectionate manner. Crossing to Tony Anholt (who was lying on the floor), it proceeded to slobber on his face

The large recreation room set assembled for this episode would also appear in the following instalment, "The Seance Spectre"; it was one of the few Alpha interiors to show exterior windows during the second series. The Venus station incident was mentioned by Koenig in "The Exiles"; Sam and Tessa's role was revealed in this episode.

=== Music ===
The score was re-edited from previous Space: 1999 incidental music tracks composed for the second series by Derek Wadsworth and draws primarily from the scores of "One Moment of Humanity" and "Space Warp".

== Reception ==
TV Zone gave the episode a favourable review, calling it "hugely enjoyable" and "a cut above the usual [Space: 1999] second season fare". It praised Landau's performance and the story's "well devised set pieces". Rating the episode "A-minus", SFX magazine called the gorilla-Maya "laughably unconvincing" but credited the "wonderfully nasty villainess" in the form of Powell, as well as Landau's "excellent" acting.

John Kenneth Muir summed up the episode as a "fast-moving and entertaining hour", even if it "breaks no new ground." He praised Landau's portrayal of Koenig's "fear and guilt", believing the performance to be worthy of an Emmy Award. He also liked the episode's focus on one-off Alphan guest characters, writing that this "makes the environment of Alpha seem more realistic, like a community."

Dreamwatch Bulletin was critical of the episode, calling it a "bit of a shambles" with a badly constructed ending. Reviewer Anthony McKay considered Powell poorly written, angrily "overacted" and lacking credibility: "Teenage temper tantrums do not suit supposedly space-hardened scientists, and using such character flaws as the basis of scripts doomed the whole production from the start."

== Novelisation ==
The episode was adapted in the fourth Year Two Space: 1999 novel The Psychomorph by Michael Butterworth published in 1977. The author would give the story a new antagonist: a massive non-corporeal space amoeba. The sentient amoeba required a massive influx of radiation to survive. It would manipulate the Alphans with the lambda-wave effect to provide the explosion that would be its salvation. Butterworth added a line where Koenig's return to Command Center interrupts Carolyn Powell from ordering the meltdown of the Moonbase nuclear reactors.
