= Dorzak =

- Space: 1999 episode
- Episode no.: Series 2 Episode 21
- Directed by: Val Guest
- Written by: Christopher Penfold
- Cinematography by: Brendan J. Stafford
- Editing by: Ray Lovejoy
- Production code: SPII 21
- Original air date: 12 March 1977

Guest appearances
- Lee Montague as Dorzak; Jill Townsend as Sahala; Kathryn Leigh Scott as Yesta; Sam Dastor as Dr Ed Spencer; Serretta Wilson as Clea; Paul Jerricho and John Judd as Security Guards

Episode chronology
← Previous "The Seance Spectre"	Next → "Devil's Planet"

"Dorzak" is an episode of the second series of Space: 1999, a 1970s British science fiction television series produced by Gerry Anderson Productions for ITC Entertainment. Written by Christopher Penfold and directed by Val Guest, it was filmed at Pinewood Studios in November 1976. It was first broadcast in the UK on 25 August 1977 by Associated Television, having previously aired on KRON-TV, San Francisco on 12 March 1977.

Opening in 1999, the series follows the crew of lunar colony Moonbase Alpha after a nuclear explosion pushes the Moon out of Earth orbit and into interstellar space. Unable to control the rogue planet's trajectory, the Alphans encounter various astronomical phenomena and alien civilisations as they search for a way back to Earth or a new world to settle on.

In "Dorzak", the Alphans encounter a prisoner transport carrying Dorzak, a Psychon whose psychic abilities allegedly brought chaos to the Croton homeworld. Maya – Alpha's resident Psychon, who knew Dorzak as a man of peace – refuses to believe that her old acquaintance has gone rogue. The episode received a mixed response from commentators.

== Plot ==
Moonbase Alpha encounters a Croton spaceship transmitting a plague alert. The captain, Sahala, promises that the disease poses no threat to humans, and the ship is permitted to land. Yesta, one of the crew, is taken to Medical with head injuries. Noticing the Psychon shapeshifter Maya, Sahala shoots her with a stun gun, declaring that the Psychons are enemies of her people.

Sahala's vessel is a prisoner transport carrying Dorzak, a dangerous Psychon in stasis. Shortly before the destruction of Psychon, Dorzak and his followers were granted refuge in the Croton system. But their psychic abilities made them a figurative "plague" – one that nearly destroyed Croton civilisation. The Crotons developed their stasis-inducing guns – "stasers" – to contain the Psychons. Sahala's ship was taking Dorzak into exile when he overcame the stasis and hypnotised Clea, who attacked Yesta and then threw herself out of an airlock.

Sahala uses her staser to revive Maya. Maya is appalled by Sahala's claims, insisting that Dorzak was known to the Psychons as "a philosopher, a poet, [...] a man of peace". Dr Russell works on resuscitating Yesta to obtain her account of events. While operating on her, she extracts an unidentified pellet from her skull. With Sahala confined to guest quarters, Maya revives Dorzak. Dorzak is gratified to meet another Psychon and confirms Maya's suspicions that Sahala is lying. However, while Maya is talking, he telepathically hypnotises Yesta. Yesta accuses Sahala of murdering Clea, and dies. Deciding that Dorzak is innocent, Verdeschi has him brought to Alpha. Captain Carter, who is fond of Sahala, still has doubts about Dorzak.

Sensors detected psychic waves before Yesta's death. The pellet is a "neuropulsonic jammer": a device implanted in all the ship's crew to block such waves. Under Dorzak's influence, Clea took hers out, and by removing Yesta's, Russell left her similarly vulnerable to attack. Verdeschi, changing his mind on Dorzak, suspects that Sahala is the only one the Psychon cannot control. To solve the mystery, the Alphans stage a hostage crisis. Maya shapeshifts into Sahala, then takes Russell to the ship at gunpoint, demanding Dorzak in exchange for the doctor's life. Believing that Maya is Sahala, Dorzak surrenders and takes Russell's place. On the ship, he admits to killing Yesta. Maya's terror gives her away and she reverts to her true form. She denounces Dorzak.

Dorzak plots his escape. Because only Sahala can pilot the ship, he must gain control over her. Hypnotising Maya, he forces her to reveal the secret of shapeshifting. He then switches places with her, forcing her to take on his form while he assumes hers. Leaving Maya in stasis, Dorzak-Maya hypnotises Russell and orders her to bring equipment to remove Sahala's jammer. Verdeschi is confused by the changes in Russell and "Maya"'s behaviour.

Given clearance to depart, Sahala boards the ship with Carter, followed by Russell. Dorzak coerces Carter into handing over his laser sidearm, then puts him in stasis. He knocks out Sahala and Russell begins the operation. Verdeschi arrives. Dorzak attempts to hypnotise him, but fails: Verdeschi, implanted with Yesta's jammer, knocks Dorzak's weapon away and stuns him. Maya, Carter and Russell are freed from the Psychon's control. With Dorzak contained, Carter and Sahala kiss at the airlock before Sahala leaves Alpha.

== Regular cast ==
- Barbara Bain as Dr Helena Russell
- Catherine Schell as Maya
- Tony Anholt as Controller Tony Verdeschi
- Nick Tate as Captain Alan Carter
- Yasuko Nagazumi as Yasko

== Production ==
After Penfold submitted his script, it was extensively revised by producer Fred Freiberger. Penfold remembered that although he enjoyed writing the episode, the final teleplay "bore little resemblance to what I had originally written". In a 1992 interview, he said that he had never watched the episode. As scripted by Penfold, Dr Spender's last name was to be Spandau.

"Dorzak" is the only episode of Space: 1999 not to feature Commander Koenig (Martin Landau), who is stated in dialogue to be off Alpha conducting an asteroid survey. The episode was purposely written to exclude Koenig so that it could be filmed simultaneously with "Devil's Planet", in which the character has a central role.

The spaceship set used furniture last seen in Series 1, as well as arches that were originally built for "The Bringers of Wonder". Costume director Emma Porteous said that Lee Montague's outfit, which was originally made for "Space Warp", was padded to make it seem like Dorzak is wearing armour.

"Dorzak" was filmed over 12 days in November 1976. During the production, actress Jill Townsend developed appendicitis. However, she insisted on finishing her scenes before seeking treatment.

== Reception ==
TV Zone magazine considered the episode "one of the finest" of Series 2, calling Montague "simply terrific". Reviewer Richard Houldsworth also praised the writing of Verdeschi and Carter but criticised Townsend as Sahala, describing her performance as "insipid" and the one "weak link" in the episode. SFX magazine rated the episode "A-minus", describing it as "surprisingly good" and praising the performances of Tate and Townsend.

John Kenneth Muir gave the episode a mixed review, calling it "well performed and well written, yet ultimately lightweight". He believed the eponymous Dorzak lacked depth, describing him as "another two-dimensional evil alien, who is evil only because the story demands it". He further criticised the episode's depiction of Psychon mental powers, finding it at odds with Maya's characterisation. Muir also thought the episode suffered from Landau's omission, and that the Crotons' plague alert was a weak plot device to start the story. However, he praised the "nicely underplayed" romantic subplot involving Sahala and Carter.

Dreamwatch magazine was negative in its assessment, stating that by this point in the series, the alien civilisations encountered by the Alphans had turned "bland and clichéd". Reviewer Anthony McKay criticised what he saw as a shift in the Alphans' role, from survivors searching for a new Earth to simple observers of extraterrestrial cultures. He argued that this demonstrates "the corruption of the series' original precepts".
