= Devil's Planet =

- Space: 1999 episode
- Episode no.: Series 2 Episode 22
- Directed by: Tom Clegg
- Written by: Michael Winder
- Editing by: Alan Killick
- Production code: SPII 22
- Original air date: 26 March 1977

Guest appearances
- Hildegarde Neil as Elizia; Roy Marsden as Crael; Dora Reisser as the interrogator; Cassandra Harris as Controller Sares; Angus MacInnes as Jelto; Arthur White as Kinano; Michael Dickinson as Blake Maine; Del Baker as the hunted prisoner; Alan Harris as the accused prisoner

Episode chronology
← Previous "Dorzak"	Next → "The Immunity Syndrome"

"Devil's Planet" is the 22nd episode of the second series of the British science fiction television series Space: 1999 (and the 46th overall episode of the programme). The screenplay was written by Michael Winder; the director was Tom Clegg. The original title of the episode was "Devil's Moon". The final shooting script is dated 9 September 1976 and live-action filming began on Monday 1 November 1976 lasting through to Thursday 18 November 1976. The episode was first broadcast in the UK on 1 September 1977 by Associated Television, having previously aired on KRON-TV, San Francisco on 26 March 1977.

== Plot ==
The Moon is passing a system containing a pair of potentially habitable planets. Commander Koenig and co-pilot Blake Maine leave Moonbase Alpha in an Eagle to carry out reconnaissance. The larger planet has a breathable atmosphere, vegetation and a city – but only one life reading, which stops after they land. They find a booth surrounded by dead humanoids who succumbed to some kind of neurological disease. A man materialises inside the booth, steps out, and then falls down dead.

Koenig and Maine proceed to the other planet. After entering the atmosphere, the Eagle collides with a powerful force field and they crash-land. A man is running from a group of women armed with whips. As the Alphans move to help him, Maine is vaporised by an invisible energy barrier. Koenig is captured and taken to the women's headquarters.

Koenig is on Entra, a penal planet for political dissidents teleported from neighbouring Ellna. Governor Elizia heads the all-female prison staff. While waiting to meet Elizia, Koenig observes a sham trial in which a prisoner convicted of sedition is sentenced to "the Hunt": if he survives the whip-wielding prison guards and reaches the Sanctuary Column, he will win parole and be teleported back to Ellna.

Koenig is subjected to a mind probe that reveals his knowledge of the Ellnan plague – news of which Elizia has suppressed to keep control of the increasingly restive prison population. Elizia orders her interrogator to remove the information from Koenig's mind, but his alien brain defeats their technology. Koenig is put in a cell with three prisoners. He tells them about the plague, but after the broadcast of Elizia's latest news propaganda programme – claiming that all is well on Ellna – his cellmates do not believe him. Elizia, who has taken a sexual interest in Koenig, offers him freedom if he submits to her, but he refuses.

An Eagle arrives in orbit to search for Koenig and Maine. Elizia tells pilots Bill Fraser and Alibe that both men were killed during the crash-landing and presents fabricated evidence of their deaths. Grieving, Fraser and Alibe set off back to Alpha.

Elizia orders Koenig to entertain her if he wants to stay alive. Appearing to capitulate, he kisses her – then pushes her away and escapes the headquarters. He runs to the Eagle wreckage and removes a homing transmitter. After using a fire extinguisher to incapacitate pursuing guards, he activates the transmitter, but the planetary force field is blocking the signal. He returns to the headquarters, and before anyone can stop him, seals himself in the teleportation booth. Elizia raises a weapon and threatens to disintegrate him. However, if she destroys the booth, there will be no way back to Ellna, and with no hope of parole, the prisoners will revolt. Koenig dares Elizia to follow him, then activates the booth. As he dematerialises, all of Elizia's people turn against her.

Arriving on Ellna, Koenig activates the transmitter. Fraser and Alibe pick up the signal. Elizia arrives, determined to kill Koenig before she dies of the plague – but it kills her in seconds. Fraser and Alibe rescue Koenig.

== Regular cast ==
- Martin Landau as Commander John Koenig
- Barbara Bain as Dr Helena Russell
- Catherine Schell as Maya
- Tony Anholt as Tony Verdeschi
- John Hug as Bill Fraser
- Alibe Parsons as Alibe
- Sam Dastor as Dr Ed Spencer

== Production ==
With a plot derived from The Most Dangerous Game, set in an alien prison reminiscent of Devil's Island, and showcasing a bevy of catsuited, whip-wielding dominatrices, "Devil's Planet" is the last of the 'Koenig Double-Up' scripts. The episode is unique in that it was intentionally crafted to feature Martin Landau alone. Barbara Bain, Catherine Schell and Tony Anholt, though receiving on-screen credit, would appear only in library footage seen during Koenig's mind-probe; Bain would also be heard narrating Helena's customary status report at the start of the episode. At the time of filming, Bain, Schell, Anholt and Nick Tate were off filming the opposing double-up episode "Dorzak".

Entitled "Devil's Moon" until post-production, the story would undergo other adjustments: (1) The Alphans were to have received a distress signal from Ellna; this was the reason Koenig was flying with a member of the medical rescue team; (2) Significant dialogue between Elizia and Crael was cut. It was inferred that Crael had served his sentence, but remained out of a sense of duty to act as defence counsel for the inmates. More dialogue about the rights of the imprisoned was also excised; (3) A sequence in the security ward was removed where, faced with Fraser's threat of attack, the Entrans view Koenig's knowledge of Earth warfare. Library footage would have depicted the history of war from marching Roman legions to the Hiroshima bomb.

The supporting cast was to include Bill Fraser, Doctor Ben Vincent and Sandra Benes. While John Hug would appear as Fraser, Jeffery Kissoon was no longer available and his role was given to newcomer Sam Dastor, playing Doctor Ed Spencer. Sahn was also replaced, as Zienia Merton was committed to a lead part in the Norwegian film Kosmetikkrevolusjonen. She had intended staying long enough to film this episode, excited that her character would leave the confines of Moonbase. However, delays in the Space: 1999 shooting schedule further pushed back the starting date and Merton was forced to depart for Norway. The role would be given to American actress Alibe Parsons. Her character, also called Alibe, is a communications officer and would be given all of the Sandra Benes scenes and dialogue for the rest of the series.

=== Music ===
The score was re-edited from previous Space: 1999 incidental music tracks composed for the second series by Derek Wadsworth and draws primarily from the scores of "The Metamorph" and "The Exiles".

== Reception ==
SFX magazine rated the episode "B-plus", calling it a "slightly pervy S&M hetero-fantasy" but also a "good romp with a very satisfactory conclusion". Dreamwatch was critical, commenting that the episode is presented in "a very dry manner, reminiscent of dull European science fiction films of the Sixties". TV Zone magazine wrote that the episode is "marred by its overbearing sexism", arguing that its female guest characters with whips and "skin-tight" costumes would not have looked out of place in an old B movie.

According to John Kenneth Muir, "Devil's Planet" demonstrates Space: 1999's "sad slide into the depths of science fiction mediocrity". He found the episode "humdrum" and "clichéd", likening the premise to that of "The Most Dangerous Game", and elaborating that the story is "so basic, so pedestrian, that it could be a Buck Rogers or even a Battlestar Galactica. 'Devil's Planet' is Space: 1999 lobotomised. The performances are solid, [...] the production values are impressive, but there are no interesting thoughts inside this space adventure – just action, action, action." Although he thought that the episode was "sabotaged" by the absence of Barbara Bain and other regular cast members, he believed that the characterisation and dialogue were "surprisingly strong", commenting that Landau and Neil's scenes "sizzle with tension".

== Novelisation ==
The episode was adapted in the fifth Year Two Space: 1999 novel The Time Fighters by Michael Butterworth published in 1977. Few changes were made to this narrative when the author chose to blend this story with "The Seance Spectre". Koenig and Maine were scouting ahead of the Moon after its emergence from a space warp. As the ship went down, they observed 'Sandor' and his mutineers overrunning Command Center. Elizia was portrayed as more psychotically sadistic, wanting to fashion Koenig's skin into a whip after he rejects her.

In the reworked omnibus Space: 1999—Year Two, the absence of Helena, Maya, Verdeschi and Carter is rationalised by placing them out of communications range on the Eagle fleet housing the Alphans while repair crews tend to the damage done to Alpha by the waste-pit detonation in "The Seance Spectre".
