= The Seance Spectre =

- Space: 1999 episode
- Episode no.: Series 2 Episode 20
- Directed by: Peter Medak
- Written by: Donald James
- Editing by: Mike Campbell
- Production code: SPII 20
- Original air date: 5 March 1977

Guest appearances
- Ken Hutchison as Greg Sanderson; Carolyn Seymour as Eva; Nigel Pegram as Cernik; James Snell as Stevens; Christopher Asante as a security guard; Harry Fielder as George; Christine White and Candy Wilson as Maya/Child

Episode chronology
← Previous "The Bringers of Wonder, Part 2"	Next → "Dorzak"

"The Seance Spectre" is the 20th episode of the second series of Space: 1999 (and the 44th overall episode of the programme). The screenplay was written by Donald James; the director was Peter Medak. The original title was "The Mutiny". The final shooting script is dated 16 September 1976. Live-action filming took place Monday 18 October 1976 through Saturday 30 October 1976. The episode was first broadcast in the UK by Associated Television on 18 August 1977, having previously aired on KRON-TV, San Francisco on 5 March 1977.

== Plot ==
The Moon is approaching a body the Alphans have named "Tora", which could be a habitable planet. To avoid giving personnel false hope, Commander Koenig limits Command Center access and classifies all information about Tora. Greg Sanderson rants about the restrictions, telling his colleagues – girlfriend Eva, Cernik, and Stevens – that Alpha's elite are hiding the discovery of a habitable world. The group attack the Command Center with laser-guns, then form a séance‑like ring and enter an self-hypnotic trance. Koenig has them confined them to Medical, where Dr Russell diagnoses them with "greensickness": hallucinations caused by prolonged exposure to Alpha's artificial environment.

It becomes clear the Moon will pass through Tora, which appears to be an interstellar cloud. Koenig and Maya leave in an Eagle to determine whether there is a solid core that poses a threat to Alpha. The greensick mutineers abscond from Medical after Eva incapacitates the guards. To force Koenig and Maya further into Tora, they sabotage Computer to stop data transmissions to the Eagle, which becomes trapped in Tora's gravity. Establishing remote control, Captain Carter blasts the Eagle free and Koenig and Maya return.

The mutineers hide out in Alpha's travel-tube network. Over radio, Koenig gives them the findings: the core of Tora is a lifeless protoplanet and the Moon is on a collision course with it. The deluded Sanderson disagrees, insisting the planet is habitable and the Moon will orbit it. The senior staff consider the Tora threat. Lacking the firepower to destroy or deflect the planet, they must alter the Moon's course instead. Koenig suggests recreating the September 1999 disaster by detonating another nuclear waste disposal site. As the explosion could devastate Alpha, its population will be evacuated to the Eagles, which will act as lifeboats.

Still at large, the mutineers are counting on Koenig's concern for their lives to stop him detonating the waste site. However, Sanderson's followers start questioning his leadership and join the evacuation. Eventually the only personnel left besides Sanderson are Koenig and Maya, who are trying to secure Alpha against the explosion. Refusing to believe there will be a collision, Sanderson comes out of hiding and attacks them. Maya disarms him but he escapes.

Koenig and Maya take an Eagle to the nuclear site, intending to set off the explosion by planting a bomb on one of the waste shafts. Sanderson intercepts them in a Moon buggy, fires on the Eagle, and attacks Koenig. In the ensuing struggle, Koenig catches Sanderson's leg, causing Sanderson to lose his balance and fall down the shaft. With the bomb set, Koenig returns to the damaged Eagle. Trapped by wreckage, Maya shapeshifts into a toddler to wriggle free and open the door to Koenig. The Eagle clears the area moments before the blast, which shifts the Moon's trajectory enough for it to pass Tora. To prevent more outbreaks of greensickness, Russell orders all personnel to watch nature footage when off-duty.

== Regular cast ==
- Martin Landau as Commander John Koenig
- Barbara Bain as Dr Helena Russell
- Catherine Schell as Maya
- Tony Anholt as Tony Verdeschi
- Nick Tate as Captain Alan Carter
- Zienia Merton as Sandra Benes

== Production ==
The episode carried the working title "The Mutiny" and had antagonist Greg Sanderson originally named 'Sandor'. A sequence showing Verdeschi and Carter coordinating the personnel and equipment evacuation from two Embarkation Areas was dropped before filming. Filmed but removed from the final cut was the end of the epilogue. After revealing that the two men are looking at pin-up girls, the viewer would have seen Maya transform into the last model to be pictured (portrayed by actress Venicia Day) and walk enticingly across the room. Verdeschi would then humorously have to stop Carter from chatting her up. Also cut for time was exposition about the waste-disposal site. Koenig would have informed Maya that these old nuclear-waste silos were designated Storage Area B-7 and had been set up in the 1980s.

This episode would feature the final appearance of Zienia Merton. Though receiving greater exposure in her second round of episodes, her continued lack of contract and reduced salary (compared to the first series) had her agent keeping an eye out for other work. Merton was offered a lead role in the Norwegian film Kosmetikkrevolusjonen. Even after receiving the blessings of both Gerry Anderson and Fred Freiberger to leave, she still hoped to finish out the series; however, constant rescheduling repeatedly extended the Space: 1999 production schedule. Forced to choose, she gambled that there would be no third series and made plans to leave the production for Norway. The notice from ITC cancelling the series came soon after, during the filming of this episode. She would be replaced in the final three episodes by American actress Alibe Parsons playing a new character, Alibe.

Among the models ogled by Verdeschi and Carter is Caroline Munro. James Snell appeared as the doomed Eagle co-pilot Cousteau in the first-series episode "Space Brain".

=== Music ===
The score was re-edited from previous Space: 1999 incidental music tracks composed for the second series by Derek Wadsworth and draws primarily from the scores of "The Metamorph" and "The Exiles".

== Reception ==
Although he believed the concept of Tora was hampered by some "implausible science", John Kenneth Muir commented positively on the episode as a whole, praising its "dynamic and charismatic" characters and "philosophical themes" of cultism and "greensickness". He also wrote that Sanderson "clearly represents Charles Manson." He concluded: "Complete with impressive special effects, a dramatic evacuation of Moonbase Alpha, and a fantastic climax atop the nuclear waste pits, 'The Seance Spectre' shines as an example of what could be accomplished within the Year 2 Space: 1999 format."

TV Zone believed "The Seance Spectre" to be a middling episode of Space: 1999, but above average for Series 2 "because it avoids cliché". The magazine praised the miniature model effects and Carolyn Seymour's "charismatic" performance as Eva. SFX magazine also wrote positively of Seymour and rated the episode "B-minus", finding it "not bad" but somewhat "lacklustre and ordinary".

Dreamwatch Bulletin and SFX believed that the episode was confusingly named. Reviewer Anthony McKay of the former commented: "The most remarkable thing about 'The Seance Spectre' – or should I say the only remarkable thing – is that it does not contain even a reference to séance or a spectre. It might be assumed that this little misnomer may have come about due to a more apposite title such as 'Crap' being unacceptable to a teatime audience."

A later article in Dreamwatch queried why the Alphans never think to contain the mutineers by simply deactivating their commlocks, noting that this approach is used to overcome a similar security threat in the Series 1 episode "Dragon's Domain". According to Dreamwatch, "The Seance Spectre" is one of several Series 2 episodes that "display no interest in story or character", instead prioritising "spectacular set pieces smothered in Derek Wadsworth's music". It elaborated: "Increasingly the show seemed to be pitched not at a mass audience, but towards its more undemanding fans."

== Novelisation ==
The episode was adapted in the fifth Year Two Space: 1999 novel The Time Fighters by Michael Butterworth published in 1977. Significant changes were made to the narrative as the author chose to blend this story with "Devil's Planet". Koenig is off exploring when Sandor and his many followers overrun Command Center; Verdeschi is the commanding officer in this story as Koenig is missing and presumed dead in the crash on Entra. Sandor and his cronies are rank-and-file Alphans, not surface explorers, and their mutiny is depicted as a workers' revolt; no mention is made of greensickness or its psychology. The story ends with Verdeschi dispatching Sandor and detonating the waste pits. These alterations would be reversed by Butterworth when he reworked the story for the Powys Media omnibus publication Space: 1999—Year Two.

In the 2003 novel The Forsaken written by John Kenneth Muir, it is stated the events of this story were one of the consequences of the death of the eponymous intelligence depicted in "Space Brain". The Brain protected the protoplanet Tora, knowing that intelligent life would eventually evolve there; after its death, the protection ceased and the Moon and Tora would almost collide.
