= The Beta Cloud =

- Space: 1999 episode
- Episode no.: Series 2 Episode 16
- Directed by: Robert Lynn
- Written by: Charles Woodgrove
- Editing by: Alan Killick
- Production code: SPII 14
- Original air date: 16 December 1976

Guest appearances
- David Prowse as The Creature; Albin Pahernik as Transformed Maya; Roy Everson as Les Johnson; Joe Dunne as Security Guard; Robert Reeves as Peter; Marc Smith as Voice of the Cloud

Episode chronology
← Previous "A Matter of Balance"	Next → "The Lambda Factor"

"The Beta Cloud" is the 16th episode of the second series of Space: 1999 (and the 40th episode overall of the programme). The screenplay was written by Fred Freiberger under the pseudonym Charles Woodgrove; the director was Robert Lynn. The final shooting script is dated 11 June 1976. Live action filming took place Monday 26 July 1976 through Friday 6 August 1976. A two-day remount was scheduled for Tuesday 21 September 1976 through Wednesday 22 September 1976 during production of the two-part episode "The Bringers of Wonder".

== Plot ==
The Moon encounters a cloud composed of unknown elements. Commander Koenig, Captain Carter and scores of others are struck down by a mysterious ailment that causes depression, weariness and indecision. Dr Russell is unable to devise a treatment. Within days, only a few dozen healthy individuals remain.

An Eagle is launched to collect particles of the cloud for analysis. It disappears, only to return three days later without its pilot. While searching the Eagle, Alpha's security personnel are attacked by a stowaway: a large, furred, frog-headed alien creature. Invulnerable to conventional weapons, it kills the entire team except Controller Verdeschi and astronaut Fraser, who barely escape. The voice of the beings inside the cloud transmits a message, stating that they need Alpha's life support system to survive. They have sent the creature to capture it.

As the creature approaches Command Center, Verdeschi evacuates everyone to the medical and life-support control sections, then initiates a base-wide lockdown. Using himself as bait, he lures the creature into a vacuum chamber in an attempt to asphyxiate it. However, it survives and attacks him. Maya comes to Verdeschi's rescue. To distract the creature, she attempts to shapeshift into its double, but finds its physiology impossible to imitate and is forced to transform into a different animal. Verdeschi breaks free and uses fire-fighting equipment to push the creature back.

Verdeschi and Maya retreat to Medical, where they find that Russell has contracted the disease. She recommends using an injector gun to give the creature a massive dose of ionethermyecin, a powerful anaesthetic. Verdeschi and Maya broadcast over Alpha's public address system to divert the creature to a hydroponics chamber, where they plan to suffocate it with chlorine. Verdeschi also contacts Fraser and Sandra Benes and orders them to fortify the approach to Life Support by setting up a barricade of high-voltage electrical cables.

With Maya in the form of a chlorine-breathing alien, the creature is tricked into the chlorine-filled room and injected with the anaesthetic. Neither the gas nor the anaesthetic has any effect, and Verdeschi and Maya are forced to flee. Verdeschi realises that instead of attacking the creature, they could attack the beings controlling it. Activating one of Alpha's laser batteries, they fire at the cloud – which fragments, but quickly re-forms. As the alien voice laughs mockingly, Verdeschi and Maya rush to Life Support to make their last stand. They admit their mutual love and kiss.

Nearing Life Support, the creature is repeatedly repelled by the barrier's electric shocks but simply keeps coming. Maya realises that it is not an organic being, but a robot. Finally breaking through, the robot knocks Fraser unconscious, injures Verdeschi, and removes the life support control core, causing all vital systems to shut down. Spotting an opening in the robot's ear, Maya shapeshifts into a bee, flies inside the robot's head and crawls around its insides, shorting out its circuits. The robot seizes up and keels over, defeated. Verdeschi replaces the core and life support is restored.

With the destruction of its agent, the cloud vanishes, as does the epidemic that came with it.

== Regular cast ==
- Martin Landau as Commander John Koenig
- Barbara Bain as Dr Helena Russell
- Catherine Schell as Maya
- Tony Anholt as Tony Verdeschi
- Nick Tate as Captain Alan Carter
- Zienia Merton as Sandra Benes
- John Hug as Bill Fraser

== Production ==
Using the 'Charles Woodgrove' pen-name a second time, series producer Fred Freiberger wrote this script with the following brief: 'How do you defeat the undefeatable?' It intrigued him that the Alphans could not defeat this creature with their considerable technical skills and ingenuity, yet a simple life-form (a bee) could bring about its downfall. It also took into consideration that series stars Martin Landau and Barbara Bain would be available for only one filming day, as it was scheduled for production during the Landaus' contracted holiday in the south of France. With the script relegating the leads to bed, the supporting ensemble found themselves with greatly expanded roles. Always budget conscious, Freiberger refused the normal writer's fee, asking only to be reimbursed for expenses.

The effects shots of the cloud were created by mixing milk in water.

During post-production, it became apparent that the episode would come in well under the required fifty-minute running time. Several additional minutes were written and filmed six weeks later during the production of "The Bringers of Wonder". The extra material included (1) A new 'hook', where the Alphans first encounter the cloud and the viewer witnesses its sinister effect on the Alphans' health (the script's original hook was a 'cold-open' with everyone already ill and Helena narrating her status report; this became the opening of Act One); (2) Additional footage of Fraser beginning work on the electrical barrier; (3) Maya's breakdown and the Weapons Section sequence where they fire at what they hope is the creature's control centre.

One part of this under-running story was trimmed. The epilogue in the Medical Centre would have had Verdeschi, after taking back his love declaration, referring to a model in a magazine he had been reading as being a 'great-looking female'—said model being a normal-appearing Catherine Schell. Maya would have transformed into Catherine Schell, accused him of having questionable taste, and torn the photograph of herself in half. Catherine Schell stated that Barbara Bain objected to the idea of Schell being shown in her natural (blonde) appearance and demanded the footage be removed.

Director Robert Lynn encountered actor and former British Weightlifting Champion David Prowse in Harrods when asking for advice on exercise equipment, and hired him for the physically demanding role of the creature. Immediately after Space: 1999, Prowse was cast in the equally-concealing part of Darth Vader in the Star Wars film series.

=== Music ===
The score was re-edited from previous Space: 1999 incidental music tracks composed for the second series by Derek Wadsworth and draws primarily from the scores of "One Moment of Humanity" and "Space Warp". (Due to the necessity of shooting additional footage to complete this episode, post-production was delayed until after the completion of the subsequent episode "Space Warp", allowing music editor Alan Willis to make use of its score.)

== Reception ==
TV Zone magazine described "The Beta Cloud" as "possibly the worst ever 1999 episode – it's hopelessly shallow [and] low on plot, and looks unforgivably cheap." It called Prowse's costume "ludicrous" and the creature he plays "as realistic as Mr Blobby but not half as entertaining". Rating it "C-minus", SFX summed up the episode as "a rather stupid runaround [...] with a cheap-looking monster". However, it praised the performances of the supporting cast. Dreamwatch Bulletin gave it 2 out of 10, criticising the writing and low budget: "There are more holes in the script than polyester hairs on the monster [...]" It found the subplot about Verdeschi and Maya's romance "clumsily" concluded and generally "embarrassing". Samira Ahmed considered the monster a low point of Series 2.

John Kenneth Muir found the premise well worn, pointing out that alien plots to steal Moonbase Alpha's life support had formed the basis of several earlier episodes. Although he wrote that the story was "one ridiculous fight scene after another" involving "another unconvincing bug-eyed monster", he complimented the episode for "[succeeding] as hard-driving action if nothing else", describing it as pleasingly fast-paced and "consistently entertaining" with engaging direction and an "emotionally satisfying" conclusion. He also noted the expanded role given to supporting character Sandra Benes, believing that the episode featured actress Zienia Merton's best performance of Series 2.

== Novelisation ==
The episode was adapted in the third Year Two Space: 1999 novel The Space-Jackers by Michael Butterworth, published in 1977. The narrative differs somewhat from the broadcast version: to save Verdeschi from the creature, Maya transforms into a two-headed, dragon-bodied, fire-breathing 'Love Beast'. The Love Beast cannot stand up to the creature and takes a severe beating. When it changes back into Maya, the transformation does not eliminate the injuries and she spends much of the segment in critical condition in the Medical Centre. A recovering Alan Carter goes off with Verdeschi to help repel the invader. Maya's epiphany comes in Medical when Ben Vincent inadvertently refers to the creature as a 'runaway robot' (in a revised version published in Space: 1999—Year Two, it is Sahn calling the creature a 'killing machine'). Later, sustained only by injections of stimulants and pain-killing drugs, she joins the three men for the final showdown at Life-Support. Sahn is again portrayed as a young Indian man, substituting for Sandra Benes and Yasko during the crisis.

In the 2003 novel The Forsaken written by John Kenneth Muir, it is stated the events of this story were one of the consequences of the death of the eponymous intelligence depicted in "Space Brain". The Brain provided life support for the xenophobic aliens residing within the cloud; after its death, the beings would be forced to look elsewhere for an alternative.
