= Savoy Dreams =

Savoy Dreams is a book by David Britton and Michael Butterworth published in 1984.

== Contents ==
Savoy Dreams is a book in retrospective about Manchester-based publishing company Savoy Books.

== Reception ==
Dave Langford reviewed Savoy Dreams for White Dwarf #60, and stated that "Dreams is a Savoy retrospective, for completists, worriers about liberty and fans of the old New Worlds, with bits by Burroughs, Moorcock, M John Harrison... articles on being persecuted, reviews, extracts, clippings, and graphics which I hated. Fascinating. Very '60s."

== Reviews ==
- Review by Brian Stableford (1984) in Fantasy Review, November 1984
- Review by Colin Greenland (1984) in Interzone, #9 Autumn 1984, (1984)
