= A Matter of Balance =

- Space: 1999 episode
- Episode no.: Series 2 Episode 15
- Directed by: Charles Crichton
- Written by: Pip and Jane Baker
- Cinematography by: Brendan J. Stafford
- Editing by: Archie Ludski
- Production code: SPII 16
- Original air date: 25 November 1976

Guest appearances
- Lynne Frederick as Shermeen Williams; Stuart Wilson as Vindrus; Nicholas Campbell as Eddie Collins; Brian Osborne as Potter; Terry Richards as the Thaed

Episode chronology
← Previous "Space Warp"	Next → "The Beta Cloud"

"A Matter of Balance" is an episode of the second series of Space: 1999, a 1970s British science fiction television series produced by Gerry Anderson Productions for ITC Entertainment. Written by Pip and Jane Baker and directed by Charles Crichton, it was filmed at Pinewood Studios in August 1976.

Opening in 1999, the series follows the crew of lunar colony Moonbase Alpha after a nuclear explosion pushes the Moon out of Earth orbit and into interstellar space. Unable to control the rogue planet's trajectory, the Alphans encounter various astronomical phenomena and alien civilisations as they search for a way back to Earth or a new world to settle on. In "A Matter of Balance", a young Alphan woman helps an antimatter alien cross into the world of matter, unaware of the permanent consequences it will hold for her.

The episode first aired on 25 November 1976 on Associated Television and received a negative response from commentators, with one review calling it the worst episode of Space: 1999 Series 2.

== Plot ==
The Moon is passing a habitable planet with abundant vegetation but no animal life. On Alpha, Commander Koenig prepares to lead a survey mission. He assigns Maya, Eagle pilot Fraser, and botanist Eddie Collins to his team. Eighteen-year-old Shermeen Williams, a technician in the hydroponics section, is upset when Controller Verdeschi, for whom she has an unrequited infatuation, tells her she has been passed over for the mission in favour of Collins. A humanoid alien appears to Williams in a ghostly vision. He is Vindrus, an inhabitant of the nearby planet, Sunim. Exploiting Williams' unhappiness, Vindrus shows her how to join the landing party: by bombarding a seed with protons, Williams instantly grows a plant with an intoxicating scent that renders Collins unconscious. She boards the Eagle in Collins' place.

On Sunim, Williams is collecting plant specimens when the others encounter a temple guarded by an aggressive reptilian creature. Vindrus reappears to Williams and guides her past the creature, which he calls a "Thaed", into the temple. He shows her a broken machine that will enable him to become solid matter, provided Williams can fix it. Shapeshifting into a fox to evade the Thaed, Maya enters the temple and locates Williams. After Maya documents the markings on the walls, the two women exit the structure unchallenged by the Thaed, which no longer sees Williams as a threat.

Back on Alpha, Maya reports that the markings show how Sunim's civilisation was destroyed in a fiery cataclysm. She theorises that the population practised matter–antimatter conversion. The Thaed is an intangible being of antimatter, explaining why Alpha's sensors failed to detect it. In Hydroponics, Vindrus is briefing Williams when Verdeschi arrives. Vindrus reveals that evolution on Sunim is the opposite of Earth's; whereas humans are still developing, Vindrus' people are degenerating into "primordial slime". They can use the temple's converter to enter the matter universe, but to maintain the balance between universes, the same number of matter beings must cross into the world of antimatter.

Verdeschi is knocked out by the irradiated plant. On Vindrus' instructions, Williams steals a portable nuclear generator. She then uses the plant on Fraser, who is put in a trance that bends him to her will. She has Fraser fly her back to Sunim in an Eagle. Koenig, Maya and Verdeschi pursue them in another Eagle. At the temple, Williams uses the generator to power up the converter. She and Vindrus stand in separate booths as the machine pulls Vindrus into the matter world. Williams realises too late that she has been tricked: as Vindrus becomes fully corporeal, she vanishes into antimatter. Koenig and Verdeschi confront Vindrus, who plans to sacrifice them in return for more of his people. As a laser gunfight ensues, Maya distracts Vindrus by transforming into a double of Williams. Koenig and Verdeschi push Vindrus into a booth and seal him in. Maya uses the converter to reverse the exchange; Williams rematerialises and Vindrus disappears. Koenig sets the generator to overload and everyone hurries back to the Eagles. The generator explodes, causing all of Sunim to revert to its antimatter state and dissolve into nothingness, leaving only the Eagles in space. The Alphans return home.

== Regular cast ==
- Martin Landau as Commander John Koenig
- Barbara Bain as Dr Helena Russell
- Catherine Schell as Maya
- Tony Anholt as Controller Tony Verdeschi
- John Hug as Pilot Bill Fraser

== Production ==
Pip and Jane Baker's shooting script, submitted in June 1976, was heavily revised by Series 2 producer Fred Freiberger. The episode was filmed over 14 days in August 1976. Outdoor scenes set on Sunim were shot on the wooded Pinewood backlot, where the grass had yellowed from weeks of drought due to that year's summer heatwave.

Principal photography overlapped with that of "Space Warp". To allow the two episodes to film simultaneously, each was written to limit the appearances of certain regular characters: Commander Koenig, Maya and Controller Verdeschi in "Space Warp", and Dr Russell and Captain Carter in "A Matter of Balance". This gave Martin Landau, Catherine Schell and Tony Anholt more time to shoot "A Matter of Balance", while freeing up Barbara Bain and Nick Tate on "Space Warp".

As scripted, Vindrus (played by Stuart Wilson) was to be attired in a tunic and trousers. In the episode as filmed, he wears a gold cape and briefs. The Thaed costume was made by Shepperton Design Studios especially for this episode. The creature's head resembles that of the robot in "The Beta Cloud".

== Reception ==
Response to the episode has been largely negative, with particular criticism directed at its portrayal of antimatter as well as Wilson's costume and make-up. TV Zone magazine considered it the worst episode of Series 2. SFX graded it "D-minus", calling Frederick's performance "painful" and the overall result "rubbish".

John Kenneth Muir, who compared the premise to that of "Seed of Destruction", found the episode technically "sloppy" and argued that it suffers on repeat viewings due to various plot holes and continuity errors. Problems cited by Muir include inconsistent explanations of how matter and antimatter react, and the limits of Vindrus' powers in the matter universe; as well as Verdeschi's seeming unfamiliarity with antimatter, even though Moonbase Alpha has encountered it before (in the Series 1 episode "Matter of Life and Death"). Muir also took issue with Williams and her lack of backstory, questioning how a teenager would have ended up on Alpha.

TV Zone also criticised the episode's explanations about the nature of antimatter, noting that Vindrus' plan to move beings between universes takes no account of their identities or the amount of matter involved. It added that the idea of an Alphan adolescent "strains credibility" but had "potential". Writing for the same magazine, Richard Houldsworth praised the location filming and found Frederick "believably gullible" as Williams. However, he criticised the "lightweight" script, describing it as a mixture of "innovative ideas and absurd claptrap", as well as the "shoddy" design of the Thaed, which he called "yet another plastic monster". He remarked that Wilson's bald cap and colourful attire make him resemble "some fourth member of Right Said Fred".

David Scott DreamWatch Bulletin (DWB) found the episode incomprehensible, negatively noting Vindrus' "gold lamé jockstrap". Anthony McKay, also of DWB, commented that the script appears to lack "any fixed notion as to what antimatter is" and criticised its use of the names "Sunim" and "Thaed" (the former spelling "Minus" backward, the latter nearly spelling "Death" backward), believing these to be "weak" and "childish" plot devices.
