= The Bringers of Wonder =

- Space: 1999 episodes
- Episode nos.: Series 2 Episodes 18 & 19
- Directed by: Tom Clegg
- Written by: Terence Feely
- Editing by: Alan Killick
- Production codes: SPII 17; SPII 18
- Original air dates: 19 February 1977 (Part 1); 26 February 1977 (Part 2)

Guest appearances
- Toby Robins as Diana Morris; Stuart Damon as Guido Verdeschi; Jeremy Young as Jack Bartlett; Drewe Henley as Joe Ehrlich; Patrick Westwood as Dr Shaw; Cher Cameron as Louisa; Al Lampert as Ken Burdett; Billy J. Mitchell as Professor Hunter; Earl Robinson as Sandstrom; Nicholas Young as Peter Rockwell; Robert Sheedy as Henry; Albin Pahernik as Maya/Lizard Animal; Nick Hobbs as Clive Kander; Glenda Allen as Female Operative; Robert Reeves as Peter; Jenny Cresswell as Command Center Operative; Okimitsu Fujii as Maya/Kendo Warrior; Roy Scammell as Maya/Alien Animal; David Jackson as Alien Voice

Episode chronology
← Previous "The Lambda Factor"	Next → "The Seance Spectre"

"The Bringers of Wonder" is a two-part episode from the second series of Space: 1999. The screenplay was written by Terence Feely; the director was Tom Clegg. The final shooting script is dated 23 June 1976. Live-action filming took place from Wednesday 25 August 1976 to Tuesday 28 September 1976 (with a two-day interruption on 21 and 22 September to film additional material for "The Beta Cloud"). A day of second unit filming was completed on Tuesday 30 November 1976. It is the series' only two-parter.

The two parts were first broadcast in the UK by Associated Television on 4 and 11 August 1977, having previously aired on KRON-TV, San Francisco on 19 and 26 February 1977. They were later re-edited and combined to create Destination: Moonbase Alpha, a Space: 1999 compilation film released by ITC Entertainment in 1978. Changes from the version originally broadcast included the addition of an opening voiceover which sets the episode in the year 2100, as well as new theme music performed by Guido and Maurizio De Angelis.

== Plot ==
=== Part 1 ===
While flying an Eagle, Commander Koenig takes leave of his senses and starts performing daredevil stunts near Moonbase Alpha's atomic waste domes. Controller Verdeschi fears that a crash will cause a nuclear explosion. Koenig hits a dome and suffers grave concussion. Arriving in a rescue Eagle, Captain Carter and scientists Bartlett and Ehrlich retrieve Koenig and return him to Alpha. Dr Russell places Koenig in an experimental neuromedical device – the Ellendorf Quadrographic Brain Complex – to prevent coma.

Alpha's sensors detect a vessel approaching faster than the speed of light. It is a Superswift, an Earth ship theoretically capable of interstellar travel. Its appearance surprises the Alphans, who understood that the Superswift project had been cancelled. They are even more shocked when the vessel lands and the crew reveal themselves to be long-lost family and friends. The captain, Guido, is Verdeschi's brother. Russell embraces Dr Shaw, her mentor from medical school. Sandra Benes and Dr Vincent are reunited with their fiancés, Peter and Louisa. Bartlett greets fellow scientist Professor Hunter. The new arrivals are an advance party; transport ships are en route to take the Alphans back to Earth, which at faster-than-light (FTL) speeds is just hours away.

Peter and Hunter slip away to Medical and psychically manipulate an orderly, Sandstrom, into sabotaging the device treating Koenig. Seeing this over a video monitor, Vincent forces Sandstrom away, though he is briefly detained by the mental control of Louisa, which puts him in a trance. Russell sedates Sandstrom.

Koenig awakes with no memory of recent events. When he sees the Earth visitors, he reacts violently, perceiving them as terrifying alien creatures. Russell is forced to stun him with her laser sidearm. Shaw scolds Louisa for failing to restrain Vincent, which has allowed Koenig to live. Louisa asks Shaw why their group fears Koenig when they could just manipulate him like the others. Shaw says that something is blocking their psychic link to him.

Guido and Shaw work together to take over Kander, a records clerk with a resistant mind. Finally succumbing to the aliens' control, he is compelled to start a fire and is consumed by the flames. As the Alphans extinguish the fire, Guido and Shaw tell Verdeschi that he must dispatch a return party before the Moon's course takes it out of range of Earth. They manipulate Verdeschi into choosing Carter, Bartlett and Ehrlich for the mission. The three men depart in an Eagle, imagining it to have been upgraded for FTL travel. However, their destination is not Earth, but the waste domes. Shaw enters medical and begins to smother the defenceless Koenig.

=== Part 2 ===
Shaw's attempt to kill Koenig is thwarted by the arrival of Maya and Russell. Koenig realises that his crashing the Eagle was the aliens' first attempt to kill him through mind control. He speculates that as the only person treated with the Ellendorf device, he has a unique perception of what is happening that allows him to see the visitors for what they really are. He tries to convince the other Alphans that the visitors cannot be who they appear – they are projecting disguises based on the Alphans' memories. Furthermore, considering time dilation, any FTL journey to the Moon would equate to centuries on Earth, meaning that their real family and friends are long dead.

Maya completes an Ellendorf session and gains the ability to see the aliens. Transforming into one of them to learn their motives, she discovers that they absorb radiation to sustain themselves. The radioactivity of their planet has been exhausted and they are searching for a new supply, obtainable by blowing up Alpha's atomic waste domes. As they have low kinetic energy, they must use illusions to trick the Alphans into performing the act themselves.

At the domes, Carter and Ehrlich procure an atomic fuel core as a catalyst for the nuclear explosion. Koenig, Maya and Russell stall them by remotely locking them inside the fuel storage facility. To break the alien's hold over the Alphans, the trio blast white noise over the Moonbase's public address system. Their true forms revealed, the aliens vanish. However, they are not defeated.

Carter and Ehrlich cut through the lock and proceed to the domes in a Moon buggy, under the illusion that they are back on Earth partaking in leisure activities. Koenig, Maya and Verdeschi take off in an Eagle to stop them. Realising that the aliens are now focusing on Carter and his accomplices, Koenig has all of Alpha's non-vital systems shut down to deprive the aliens of electromagnetic radiation. As there is electrical activity in the human brain, he also has anaesthetic gas released into the ventilation system to render the personnel unconscious.

The Eagle crew catch up with Carter, Ehrlich and Bartlett. In the ensuing struggle, Ehrlich's spacesuit is breached and he is evacuated to Alpha. Carter and Bartlett are about to force the fuel core into the storage chamber when Koenig tackles Carter and Bartlett breaks free of the aliens' control. The alien leader appears, admitting that its people deceived the Alphans but asking whether their struggle to survive in space is truly preferable to the joys that the aliens offered them. Carter, still under control, tries to set off the explosion but is thwarted by Koenig. As the alien leader curses Koenig for condemning the Alphans to a futile existence, the aliens and their spacecraft vanish for good.

== Regular cast ==
- Martin Landau as Commander John Koenig
- Barbara Bain as Dr Helena Russell
- Catherine Schell as Maya
- Tony Anholt as Tony Verdeschi
- Nick Tate as Captain Alan Carter
- Zienia Merton as Sandra Benes
- Jeffery Kissoon as Dr Ben Vincent

== Production ==
On the strength of his first script, "New Adam New Eve", Gerry Anderson and Fred Freiberger commissioned a second submission from writer Terence Feely. Pleased with his treatment (titled "The Globs"), the decision was made to expand the story into a two-part episode. Freiberger planned these episodes to have the same grand scale achieved by the first series on his limited budget. Amortising costs over two segments allowed for a large guest cast and more expansive sets. During live-action shooting, Feely went on holiday for a month. On his return, he was unhappy to learn that Freiberger had heavily re-written his scripts. The change he most objected to involved the early revelation of the aliens. In his version, he had hidden their true appearance until the final scenes of Part 1, when the "Dr Shaw" being moves in to kill Koenig. He had wanted the audience to believe that Koenig really could be insane.

A character moment for Dr Russell was cut for time in which she reminisces with Dr Shaw how the first patient she lost was her father, who had died of a massive heart attack in their home while she was still in medical school. The epilogue scene where Maya and Verdeschi were attacked by Sandstrom was altered for budgetary and logistical reasons. In the 23 June 1976 draft, Maya was to transform into a python to subdue the crazed orderly; by 24 August 1976, amendments had Maya changing into a Kendo warrior instead.

Stuart Damon, who plays Guido Verdeschi, appeared in the Series 1 episode "Matter of Life and Death" as a survey mission pilot.

Costumes, props and sets re-used in this episode include: (1) The blue lizard animal Maya transforms into when angered by Diana Morris was a re-painted version of the Kreno animal, previously seen in "The AB Chrysalis" and "The Beta Cloud"; (2) The Ellendorf machine prop was a revamped version of the Dorfman artificial-heart test machine from "Catacombs of the Moon"; (3) The nuclear waste domes were cannibalised from the spherical towers seen in "The AB Chrysalis"; (4) The interior of the pilot ship was originally seen in the earlier Anderson production UFO as various transport planes.

Only three alien "jellies" (as they were known in the script) were constructed for the production; for crowd scenes, life-sized photographic cut-outs were employed. Cast from latex, the costumes were painted with grease for the slime effect and had artificial blood pumping through fine transparent tubing. Supporting actor David Jackson, who had appeared under considerable latex appliances for his role as an alien in "The Rules of Luton", was relieved that there was no special make-up for this role in "The Bringers of Wonder". He read his lines from off-screen while a stuntman sweated under what Jackson called an unwieldy latex "teepee".

In the broadcast version of Part 2, Russell's status report used to re-cap the previous episode mentions the date as "2515 days" after leaving Earth orbit; the shooting script clearly has the date typed correctly as "1915 days". It has been speculated that actress Barbara Bain simply misread or misspoke the line; however, when viewing the compilation movie Destination: Moonbase Alpha released by ITC London in 1978, the line in question is spoken by Bain as "1915 days"

Many publicity shots of Nick Tate and the unidentified actress playing his illusory companion were taken in the Pinewood Studios gardens and surrounding grounds during the shooting of their scenes.

=== Music ===
The score was re-edited from previous Space: 1999 incidental music tracks composed for the second series by Derek Wadsworth and draws primarily from the scores of "The Metamorph", "Space Warp" and (for Part 2) "The Taybor".

In Part 2, a movement of Beethoven's 'Symphony No. 5 in C minor' can be heard during Bartlett's illusion of listening to the piece on his hi-fi system, while in reality he was preparing the waste domes for detonation.

== Reception ==
"The Bringers of Wonder" has had a mixed critical response. TV Zone magazine considered it the best story of Space: 1999 Series 2, while SciFiNow ranked it among Series 2's better stories. On the other hand, Paul Mount of Starburst described it as "'monster-of-the-week', pulpy sci-fi" which "squanders a few interesting concepts for the sake of some gaudy and ludicrous alien costumes". He criticised the "sloppiness" of the writing and design, adding that the alien creatures "look as if they've just wandered in from the set of a 1960s Lost in Space episode." A review for entertainment-focus.com commented that the story "stretches credulity to the limit", with some elements being "utterly implausible". It also called the alien design "unintentionally comic".

According to DreamWatch Bulletin, Part 1 is "probably" Series 2's best episode, while Part 2 "[jettisons] all the well-built-up suspense" in favour of "extended action set pieces." A later review in Dreamwatch rated the first part 6 out of 10 and the second 5 out of 10, describing the former as "highly enjoyable nonsense" and the latter "initially marred by a lot of exposition about what the monsters want". SFX magazine gave Part 1 an "A" grade, summing it up as a "very entertaining" episode with "great production values". It rated Part 2 "A-minus", calling it an "exciting and satisfactory conclusion" despite its "rather obvious plot holes, and the unintentionally hilarious 'plasma aliens' chase sequence".

Ian Fryer, who regarded the entire two-part story as Series 2's "key episode", argued that the plot of Part 2 is stretched out with some unnecessary fight sequences. However, he considered the ending "surprisingly good", aided by Koenig's dialogue and the "splendid" waste domes set.

Although he found it generally well written, performed and directed, with some "fantastically" choreographed fights and "superb production values", John Kenneth Muir considered "The Bringers of Wonder" an example of how Series 2 episodes often "grabbed defeat from the jaws of victory", finding the plot weakened by small continuity errors and the illogical actions of some characters. He wrote that the story is liable to "suffer [...] on repeat viewing", remaining "enjoyable [...] only if the viewer does not think about it too much."

Examining the influence of the original Star Trek on Space: 1999 Year 2, James F. Iaccino of Benedictine University compared the Talosians of Star Trek's "The Cage" with the villains in "The Bringers of Wonder": "While the intent of the alien races is different, the means by which they try to accomplish their goals is similar — namely, to mislead the space crews by giving them desirable images of home and memories of their past."

== Novelisation ==
The episode was adapted in the fourth Year 2 Space: 1999 novel The Psychomorph by Michael Butterworth, published in 1977. The author would make the jelly aliens the psychically-synthesised minions of a massive non-corporeal space amoeba (which was also the unseen antagonist in the previous segment "The Lambda Factor"). The sentient amoeba was dying and required a massive influx of radiation to rejuvenate itself. It would manipulate the Alphans with the lambda-wave effect to provide the explosion that would be its salvation.

In the 2003 novel The Forsaken written by John Kenneth Muir, it is stated the events of this story were one of the consequences of the death of the eponymous intelligence depicted in "Space Brain". The Brain provided the radiation required for the jelloid aliens' survival; after its death, the jelloid beings would being searching for alternate sources of sustenance.
