= 5 Men and a Limo =

1997 film

- Produced by: Aspect Ratio
- Starring: Clinton Hendricks; Don LaFontaine; John Leader; Nick Tate; Mark Elliott; Al Chalk; Hal Douglas (cameo voiceover)
- Distributed by: Aspect Ratio
- Release date: 1997
- Running time: 4 minutes 21 seconds
- Country: United States
- Language: English

5 Men and a Limo is a 1997 American short film produced by Aspect Ratio as an introduction sketch for the 26th Annual The Hollywood Reporter Key Art Awards. In the film voiceover actor Don LaFontaine picks up four other voiceover actors in his limo to travel to the awards. The actors talk about themselves and the awards, making humorous references to common phrases and techniques they use when voicing movie trailers. Besides LaFontaine, the other actors appearing in the film are John Leader, Nick Tate, Mark Elliott, and Al Chalk. Hal Douglas provides his voice for a telephone call, but does not appear.

The limousine in the film is LaFontaine's. The driver is Clinton Hendricks, LaFontaine's personal sound engineer and driver.

== Reception ==
The film's original purpose was to serve as an introductory sketch for the 1997 The Hollywood Reporter Key Art Awards broadcast. According to John Leader, the sketch played to a packed house at the awards ceremony and was so well received that the next day, bootlegged copies began circulating around the Internet; to date, one copy of the film has nearly one million views on YouTube alone. In addition, the five voiceover artists, many of whom had few on-camera credits to their names prior to 5 Men and a Limo, had become instantly recognizable; LaFontaine went on to do on-screen appearances in commercials for GEICO as "that announcer guy from the movies", while Leader has done on-screen commercials for Burger King and Kudos granola bars.

== Cultural references ==
The short film opens with the "James Bond Theme," before transitioning into the theme from Back to the Future after the show's opening graphics. When Hal Douglas is heard phoning LaFontaine, the familiar intro to the "Theme from New York, New York" is heard on the music track as a subtle indication of Douglas' East Coast management. This is abruptly interrupted by a sample from the 1985 electronica song "Oh Yeah" by Swiss band Yello, once LaFontaine ignores Douglas and introduces Al Chalk. An excerpt from the score of Groundhog Day is heard when Mark Elliott enters the film. Otherwise the score from Dragon: The Bruce Lee Story and other score is Come See the Paradise from fire in the Brooklyn theater by Randy Edelman and was used Clear and Present Danger movie trailer and Rudy by Jerry Goldsmith is heard in the background during many of the voiceovers provided by the limousine's passengers.
