= Carolyn Seymour =

British actress (born 1947)

- Born: Carolyn von Benckendorf; 6 November 1947 (age 79); Buckinghamshire, England
- Occupation: Actress
- Years active: 1969–present
- Spouse: Peter Medak (m. 1973; div. 1984)
- Children: 2

External image
- Carolyn Seymour, 1972

Carolyn Seymour (born 6 November 1947) is an English actress, best known for playing Abby Grant in the BBC series Survivors (1975) and Queen Myrrah in the Gears of War franchise.

== Career ==
She was born Carolyn von Benckendorf in Buckinghamshire to an Estonian father of Russian descent and an Irish mother. One of her early television roles was as Jenny in the BBC drama series Take Three Girls, and an early film appearance was as Zita in the film Steptoe and Son (1972) alongside Harry H. Corbett and Wilfrid Brambell. Her best-known movie role remains Grace Gurney in The Ruling Class (1972), opposite Peter O'Toole.

She left Survivors at the end of its first series due to disagreements with the producers over the direction the show and her character were taking. She appeared in the Space: 1999 episode "The Seance Spectre", and with Joan Collins in The Bitch (1979). She then moved to the United States and made numerous appearances on television shows, including Hart to Hart; Modesty Blaise; Family Ties; Cagney & Lacey; Remington Steele; Magnum, P.I.; The Twilight Zone; Murder, She Wrote; Matlock; Quantum Leap; Star Trek: The Next Generation; Civil Wars; L.A. Law; Red Shoe Diaries; Star Trek: Voyager; and ER.

She has contributed voice work for several Star Wars video games, playing characters such as Shmi Skywalker and Mon Mothma. She provides the voice for the Myrrah, Queen of the Locust Horde in Gears of War, Dr. Karin Chakwas in the Mass Effect series and the Elder God of Water in Mortal Kombat Annihilation. She has played in audio plays by L.A. Theatre Works and Hollywood Theater of the Ear as well as narrated audiobooks.

In 2014, she reprised the role of Abby Grant in Big Finish Productions' Survivors series, based on the book by Terry Nation and the television series. She has played various roles for the company, and in April 2021, it released a career retrospective interview with her titled Carolyn Seymour in Conversation.

Since 2014, she has voiced Bierce in Dark Deception.

== Personal life ==
Seymour married director Peter Medak in 1973. The couple had two children and divorced in 1984.

== Filmography ==
=== Film ===
Year	Title	Role	Notes
1971	Unman, Wittering and Zigo	Silvia Ebony	
1971	Gumshoe	Alison	
1972	Steptoe and Son	Zita Steptoe	
1972	The Ruling Class	Grace Shelley	
1973	Yellow Dog	Della	
1977	The Assignment	Danica Rodriguez	
1978	The Odd Job	Angie	
1979	The Bitch	Polly Logan	
1980	Bad Timing	Lisa Dietrich	
1981	Zorro, The Gay Blade	Dolores	
1983	Mr. Mom	Eve	
1990	Midnight Cabaret	Orion	
1995	Congo	Eleanor Romy	
1997	Mortal Kombat Annihilation	Elder God No. 2	
2001	Ablaze	Vivian Sims	
2003	I Witness	Lady Anne	
2007	Hard Four	Maxine De Winter	
2008	Dark Streets	Gloria	
2008	The Moon and He	Leila	Short
2010	The Favour of Your Company	Pamela Wilde	Short

=== Television ===
Year	Title	Role	Notes
1971	Take Three Girls	Jenny	Main role
1971–1973	ITV Sunday Night Theatre	Connie Bell, Vicky	2 episodes
1972	ITV Playhouse	Angela Harrison	Episode: "The Greeks and Their Gifts"
1974	Justice	Joy Mostyn	Episode: "Matrimonial Malice"
1975	The Prodigal Daughter	Christine Smith	TV film
1975	Edward the Seventh	"Daisy," Lady Brooke/Lady Warwick	Episodes 9, "Scandal," and 10, "The Years of Waiting"
1975	Survivors	Abby Grant	Main role (series 1)
1977	Space: 1999	Eva	Episode: "The Seance Spectre"
1978	Return of the Saint	Lady Greer Stevens	Episode: "The Arrangement"
1979	Hazell	Caroline Bancroft	Episode: "Hazell Gets the Bird"
1981	Mistress of Paradise	Adele	TV film
1982	Hart to Hart	Celeste Dumont	Episode: "Vintage Harts"
1982	The Devlin Connection	Elspeth	Episode: "Love, Sin and Death at Point Dume"
1982	Modesty Blaise	Debbie DeFarge	TV film
1983	The Greatest American Hero	Kris Peterson	Episode: "Heaven Is in Your Genes"
1983	The Last Ninja	Lydia	TV film
1983	Family Ties	Lorraine Ferrar	Episode: "Sweet Lorraine"
1983	Girls of the White Orchid	Madame Mori	TV film; alternative title Death Ride to Osaka
1983–1984	Cagney & Lacey	Renata Myers, Marie-Chantal	2 episodes
1984	Remington Steele	Shelby Haines	Episode: "Blood Is Thicker Than Steel"
1984	Blue Thunder	Helen	Episode: "The Island"
1984–1985	Magnum, P.I.	Elizabeth, Lady Ashley, Leeann	2 episodes
1985	Otherworld	Prime Manager	Episode: "Princess Metra"
1985	Alfred Hitchcock Presents	Carla Dean	Episode: "Wake Me When I'm Dead"
1985	The Twilight Zone	Megaera	Episode: "Ye Gods"
1985–1986	Tales from the Darkside	Aisha Candisha, Andrea Caldwell	2 episodes
1986–1989	Matlock	Christina Harrison Ward, Vanessa Sedgwick, Iris Vogel	3 episodes
1986	Adam's Apple	D.A. Trisha Hammond	TV film
1987	Poor Little Rich Girl: The Barbara Hutton Story	Dorothy Difrasso	TV film
1987–1995	Murder, She Wrote	Pauline Constable, Alice Montrose, Nellie Ruddy	3 episodes
1988	CBS Summer Playhouse	Celia	Episode: "Old Money"
1989	Living Dolls	Mrs. Tate	Episode: "Guess Who's Not Coming to Dinner"
1989–1993	Star Trek: The Next Generation	Subcommander Taris, Mirasta Yale, Commander Toreth	3 episodes: "Contagion", "First Contact", "Face of the Enemy"
1989–1993	Quantum Leap	Priscilla Stoltz, Zoey	4 episodes
1990	Blue Bayou	Raleigh McMain	TV film
1990	Father Dowling Mysteries	Nurse Eunice	Episode: "The Medical Mystery"
1991	The Flash	Jocelyn Weller	Episode: "Done with Mirrors"
1991	Over My Dead Body	Diane Beckett	Episode: "An Actor Prepares"
1992	Civil Wars	Bettina Peck-Naughton	Episode: "Tape Fear"
1992	Dark Justice	Michelle	Episode: "Needy Things"
1993	The Legend of Prince Valiant	Moira	Voice, episode: "The Princess Aleta"
1993	Jack's Place	Maggie	Episode: "Forever and Ever"
1993	Class of '96	Anna Horvath	Episode: "Parents Weekend"
1994	L.A. Law	Vivian Askoff	2 episodes
1994	Rebel Highway	Mrs. Evelyn Turnbull	Episode: "Reform School Girl"
1995	Silk Stalkings	Sarah Rowan	Episode: "Friendly Persuasion"
1995	Star Trek: Voyager	Mrs. Templeton	2 episodes
1996	The Real Adventures of Jonny Quest	Sarah	Voice, episode: "The Spectre of the Pine Barrens"
1997	Babylon 5	Sen. Crosby	Episode: "Endgame"
1998	Superman: The Animated Series	Kala In-Ze	Voice, episode: "Little Girl Lost"
2001	ER	Dr. Skoft	Episode: "The Longer You Stay"
2002	Still Standing	Beverly Gerber	Episode: "Still Scalping"
2004	Judging Amy	Atty. Marla Rosen	Episode: "My Little Runaway"
2005	Malcolm in the Middle	Nina	Episode: "Mrs. Tri-County"
2007	The Replacements	Agent B	Voice, episode: "London Calling"

=== Video games ===
Year	Title	Role	Notes
1999	Star Wars: Episode I – The Phantom Menace	Concerned Mother, Shmi Skywalker, TC-14	
1999	Gabriel Knight 3: Blood of the Sacred, Blood of the Damned	Estelle Stiles	
1999	Revenant	Heather, Townswomen	
1999	Indiana Jones and the Infernal Machine	Babylonian Holy Woman	
1999	Star Wars: Jar Jar's Journey Adventure Book	Shmi Skywalker, Jellyfish	
2000	Star Wars: Force Commander	AT-AT Barge Pilot, ATC-Frigate, Heavy Lifter Pilot	
2001	Star Wars: Galactic Battlegrounds	Empire Destroyer Captain, Gungan Medic, Starbomer Pilot	
2002	Star Wars Jedi Knight II: Jedi Outcast	Mon Mothma	
2002	Summoner 2	Dama Sivora	
2003	Armed and Dangerous	Peasant Woman 1	
2003	Star Wars: Knights of the Old Republic	Admiral Forn Dodonna, Helena Shan, Elora	
2004	Star Wars Knights of the Old Republic II: The Sith Lords	Administrator Terena Adare, Iziz Citizen, Republic Captain	
2005	Agatha Christie: And Then There Were None	Emily Brent, Ethel Rogers	
2006	Star Wars: Empire at War	Mon Mothma	
2006	Agatha Christie: Murder on the Orient Express	Princess Dragomiroff	
2006	Gears of War	Queen Myrrah	
2007	Mass Effect	Dr. Karin Chakwas	
2008	Gears of War 2	Queen Myrrah	
2009	Dragon Age: Origins	Keeper Marethari, Sister Theohild, Grand Cleric Elemena, Sister Augustine, Edwina, Agatha, Redcliffe Old Woman, Circle Tower Mage	
2010	Mass Effect 2	Dr. Karin Chakwas	
2011	Gears of War 3	Queen Myrrah	
2012	Mass Effect 3	Dr. Karin Chakwas, Teresa	
2013	Gears of War: Judgment	Queen Myrrah	
2018	Dark Deception	Helen Bierce	
2019	Gears 5	Queen Myrrah	
2020	Dark Deception: Monsters and Mortals	Helen Bierce	
