= Dallas Adams =

English actor (1947–1991)

- Born: Dallas Roland Adams; 17 February 1947; Islington, London, England
- Died: 29 August 1991 (aged 44); Camden, London, England
- Occupation: Actor
- Television: Space: 1999; Bergerac; Doctor Who

Dallas Roland Adams (17 February 1947 – 29 August 1991) was an English actor noted for his television performances.

His television credits include Strange Report, Thriller, Space: 1999, Bergerac, Doctor Who (in the serial Planet of Fire), Robin of Sherwood and Agatha Christie's Poirot, and his film credits include A Midsummer Night's Dream (1968), The Abominable Dr. Phibes (1971), Frankenstein: The True Story (1973), From Beyond the Grave (1974), Gulag (1985) and King Ralph (1991).

Adams, who started his career with the Royal Shakespeare Company in Stratford-upon-Avon in 1968 was also a painter and a playwright. His working-class family (his mother worked as a cleaner, and his father Alec as a taxi driver) moved from Islington to the L.C.C. Estate at South Oxhey near Watford in the 1950s, where they lived in Little Oxhey Lane.

According to the audio memoirs of John Nathan-Turner, in the early 1980s, Adams was the largest gay palimony lawsuit winner in English legal history, and his casting in Doctor Who had been criticised by homophobic elements in the British tabloid press. He died in Camden, London in 1991 of AIDS, aged 44.

== Partial filmography ==
- A Midsummer Night's Dream (1968) – Attendant
- The Abominable Dr. Phibes (1971) – 2nd Police Official
- Frankenstein: The True Story (1973) – Felix
- From Beyond the Grave (1974) – 2nd young male new flat owner (segment 1 "The Gate Crasher") (uncredited)
- Space: 1999 (1976) – Episode: "The Lambda Factor"
- Gulag (1985) – Pearson
- King Ralph (1991) – MC at Strip Club (final film role)
