= The Search for the Nile =

- Genre: Period drama
- Written by: Michael Hastings; Derek Marlowe
- Starring: Kenneth Haigh; John Quentin; Barbara Leigh-Hunt; Michael Gough; Ian McCulloch; Norman Rossington; Keith Buckley; Catherine Schell; Andre Van Gyseghem
- Narrated by: James Mason
- Theme music composer: Joseph Horovitz
- Country of origin: United Kingdom
- Original language: English
- No. of series: 1
- No. of episodes: 6

Production
- Producer: Christopher Ralling

Original release
- Network: BBC 2
- Release: 22 September – 27 October 1971

The Search for the Nile is a six-part BBC 2 miniseries filmed in Africa and released in 1971. The series tells the story of the expeditions of explorers John Hanning Speke, Richard Francis Burton, Samuel and Florence Baker, as well as David Livingstone and Henry Morton Stanley in their respective searches to find the source of the Nile in the 19th century.

Highly acclaimed, the series won the 1972 primetime Emmy in the docu-drama special achievement category and a 1972 Peabody Award. Kenneth Haigh, who played Burton, was nominated for Best Leading Actor in a 1971 TV-Drama in the 1972 BAFTA Awards.
