= The Adventurer (TV series) =

British television crime series (1972–1973)

- Genre: Crime thriller Adventure; Spy drama
- Created by: Monty Berman; Dennis Spooner
- Starring: Gene Barry; Barry Morse; Catherine Schell; Garrick Hagon
- Theme music composer: John Barry
- Country of origin: United Kingdom
- No. of episodes: 26

Production
- Running time: 30 minutes
- Production company: ITC Entertainment

Original release
- Network: ATV
- Release: 29 September 1972 – 30 March 1973

The Adventurer is a 1972 British television crime thriller/adventure series created by Monty Berman and Dennis Spooner. It premiered on ITV in the United Kingdom on 29 September 1972. The show starred Gene Barry as Gene Bradley, a secret government agent who poses as a wealthy movie star.

The series contain plots and scenes that combine elements of the crime thriller, adventure, and secret agent drama genres.

== Reception ==
The Guardian referred to The Adventurer as "an unsatisfactory half-hour series, with an overage lead in Gene Barry".

== Main cast ==
- Gene Barry as Gene Bradley
- Barry Morse as Mr. Parminter (twenty-five episodes)
- Catherine Schell as Diane Marsh (eleven episodes)
- Garrick Hagon as Gavin Taylor (ten episodes)

== Supporting / guests ==
- Dennis Price as Brandon (three episodes)
- Ken Wayne as Director (one episode)
- Stuart Damon as Vince Elliot (two episodes)
- Sue Gerrard as Jane (two episodes, plus opening titles)

== Episode list ==
1. Miss Me Once, Miss Me Twice and Miss Me Once Again
2. Poor Little Rich Girl
3. Thrust and Counter Thrust
4. The Bradley Way
5. Return to Sender
6. Counterstrike
7. Love Always, Magda
8. Nearly the End of the Picture
9. Deadlock
10. Has Anyone Here Seen Kelly?
11. Skeleton in the Cupboard
12. Target!
13. Action!
14. Full Fathom Five
15. I'll Get There Sometime
16. To the Lowest Bidder
17. Going, Going...
18. The Not-So Merry Widow
19. Mr. Calloway Is a Very Cautious Man
20. Double Exposure
21. The Case of the Poisoned Pawn
22. The Solid Gold Hearse
23. Make It a Million
24. Icons Are Forever
25. Somebody Doesn't Like Me
26. The Good Book

== Home media ==
A Region 2 DVD release of the show, which features interviews with Morse, Damon and Schell, is available from Network. Barry refused to be interviewed, and other cast members accused him of being "short-tempered" and "egomaniacal". Morse sums up the series in the DVD extras: "It wasn't the worst show ever made, but it certainly wasn't the best!"
