= Meng and Ecker =

Meng and Ecker was a British underground comic written by David Britton and illustrated by Kris Guidio. It was published in 1989 by the controversial Manchester-based company Savoy and lasted for nine issues before being banned in 1992 under obscenity laws.

== Concept ==
The characters Meng and Ecker were inspired by Nazi doctor Josef Mengele. Authorities pulped thousands of copies of Meng & Ecker after finding the book "obscene and likely to corrupt." In finding the comic obscene, the judge said, "This comic could be read - and possibly gloated over - by people who enjoyed viciousness and violence. It had pictures that would be repulsive to right-thinking people."

Meng and Ecker also appeared in three controversial prose novels written by Britton: Lord Horror (1990), Motherfuckers: The Auschwitz of Oz (1996), and Baptised in the Blood of Millions (2001). The first novel, Lord Horror, was the first book to be banned in the United Kingdom since Hubert Selby's Last Exit to Brooklyn was banned in 1968.

The name 'Meng & Ecker' is a homage to a Manchester Tearooms, which operated near St Ann's Square for most of the twentieth century.
