= Lana, Queen of the Amazons =

1964 film directed by Géza von Cziffra

- Film poster
- German: Lana - Königin der Amazonen
- Directed by: Cyl Farne; Géza von Cziffra
- Written by: Cyl Farney; Rita Niederer; Géza von Cziffra; Ernst von Hasselbach
- Produced by: Alfred Bittins; Luiz Severiano Ribeiro; Franz Thierry
- Starring: Anton Diffring; Catherine Schell; Christian Wolff
- Cinematography: Edgar Eichhorn; Wolfgang Hannemann; Werner M. Lenz; Harry Zalkowistch
- Edited by: Margot Jahn; Waldemar Noya; Liselotte Schumacher; Wolfgang Wehrum
- Music by: Erwin Halletz; Herbert Trantow
- Production companies: Arca Studio, Berlin; Atlântida Cinematográfica; Team-Film
- Distributed by: Bavaria Film
- Release date: 27 November 1964
- Running time: 79 minutes
- Countries: West Germany; Brazil
- Language: German

Lana, Queen of the Amazons (German: Lana - Königin der Amazonen) is a 1964 West German-Brazilian adventure film written and directed by Cyl Farney and Géza von Cziffra and starring Anton Diffring, Catherine Schell and Christian Wolff.

The film's sets were designed by the art director Alexandre Horvat. Location shooting took place in Brazil in Belém, Rio de Janeiro and along the Amazon River.

== Plot ==
Queen Lana is aided by a scientist and his nephew as they battle prospectors in the Brazilian jungle to protect a legendary Amazon treasure.

== Cast ==
- Anton Diffring as Professor Van Vries
- Catherine Schell as Queen Lana
- Christian Wolff as Peter van Vries
- Michael Hinz as Matteo
- Yara Lex as Tahira
- Dieter Eppler as Giovanni di Araúza / Gerónimo de Araújo
- Haydee Pinto as Amazon #2
- Átila Iório as Black guide / Casanova
- Adalberto Silva as White guide
