= Mark Elliott (voice-over artist) =

American actor (1939–2021)

- Born: John Harrison Frick Jr. September 24, 1939; Cedar Rapids, Iowa, U.S.
- Died: April 3, 2021 (aged 81); Los Angeles, California, U.S.
- Other names: Sandy Shore; Buddy Harrison; Ed Mitchell; Mark Elliott
- Occupation: Voice-over artist
- Years active: 1957–2021

John Harrison Frick Jr., also known as Mark Elliott (September 24, 1939 – April 3, 2021), was an American voice-over artist who performed numerous voice-overs for The Walt Disney Company from 1977 to 2010. He was also the voice of CBS and FOX throughout the 1980s and 1990s, and various theatrical trailers for other animated films.

== Early life ==
Elliott was born in Cedar Rapids, Iowa. After graduating from high school in 1957, Frick's first job was as a radio disc jockey under the name "John Harrison" at the small Cedar Rapids-based station KPIG. For two years, he worked six nights a week from 11pm to 7am, bringing home $67.50 per week. In 1959, as rock and roll was on the rise, he was offered a job at KCRG, where he would work as "Sandy Shore". At one point, he was invited to Philadelphia to fill in for Dick Clark on American Bandstand. In 1964, he moved to KIOA in Des Moines, and in 1968 he went to WKYC in Cleveland, Ohio as "Buddy Harrison". Two months later, he moved to CKLW in Ontario as "Ed Mitchell".

== Career ==
Upon arriving at San Francisco's KFRC in early 1970, Frick wished to re-use the name "Sandy Shore", whereas the management proposed the name "Johnny Baron", which Frick felt sounded shady. They settled on "Mark Anthony", but felt the name was too close to Mark Antony. While standing next to a jukebox, Elliott saw the names Petula Clark and Mama Cass (Elliot) and suggested Clark Elliot, but he had difficulty pronouncing the name. Eventually, he settled on combining the suggested names to form "Marc Elliott". Upon moving to Los Angeles, he altered the spelling to "Mark Elliott", which would become his legal name. In Los Angeles, he began one of two stints at KHJ in Los Angeles, working briefly at KIIS in between. Having worked as a disc jockey for 20 years at this point, Elliott began to tire of the occupation.

Elliott occasionally substituted for Casey Kasem as host of American Top 40 in the late 1970s and early 1980s.

During the mid-1970s, Elliott began doing more advertising and promotional voice-over work. His most notable advertisements at the time were for the 1977 films Star Wars, Smokey and the Bandit, and The Goodbye Girl. All three films would become commercially successful and culturally significant, and Elliott's profile was elevated, convincing him to leave radio for a full-time career as a freelance voice-over artist.

In 1979, Elliott became the principal voice of CBS's on-air promotions, his first work being promos for The Bad News Bears. At one point during this assignment, Elliott performed for a promo that bizarrely juxtaposed the teen series California Fever with the made-for-TV thriller film Death Car on the Freeway. This promo proved to be a display of Elliott's versatility and granted him more work at CBS. During this period, Elliott voiced over the trailer for the 1981 British sports film Chariots of Fire and the promo for the 1983 series finale of M*A*S*H; Elliott retrospectively deemed these to be his proudest moments in his voice-over career. By 1985, Elliott branched out to become a co-owner of a Los Angeles restaurant, a record company, and a small lingerie company.

Elliott's long-term association with The Walt Disney Company began in 1977 when the company's in-house trailer producer Craig Murray hired Elliott to provide the voice-over for a re-release of Cinderella. From that point, he would provide several voice-overs for Disney's theatrical trailers, previews and home entertainment release bumpers, as well as narrate the anthology series The Magical World of Disney. Reflecting on his role as "the voice of Disney", Elliott regarded it as "a wonderful touchstone for my career", adding that "If that's the identity that I carry with me for the rest of my life, I wouldn't have it any other way".

In 1997, Elliott and fellow voice-over artists Don LaFontaine, Nick Tate, John Leader, and Al Chalk appeared in 5 Men and a Limo, a sketch shown as part of The Hollywood Reporter's Key Art Awards. He also appeared as himself in Lake Bell's 2013 comedy film In a World....

== Death ==
Elliott suffered from lung cancer in his later years. He died after suffering two heart attacks on April 3, 2021.
