= David Britton =

British author, artist, and publisher (1945–2020)

- Born: 18 February 1945
- Died: 29 December 2020 (aged 75)
- Education: St John's College, Durham
- Occupations: Author, artist, publisher
- Writing career
- Period: 1970s–2020
- Genres: Speculative fiction, Horror
- Notable work: Lord Horror series

David Britton (18 February 1945 – 29 December 2020) was a British author, artist, and publisher. After early work in independently published small print magazines Britton and Michael Butterworth co-founded the publishing house Savoy Books in 1976.

== Life and work ==
Britton was of Irish and possible Jewish ancestry and grew up in northern Manchester. Early in his adult life he studied at St John's College, Durham, graduating with a degree in Education in 1969. When he first met Savoy co-founder Michael Butterworth in the early 1970s, Britton was running The House on the Borderland bookshop in Manchester.

During 1985-89 Britton wrote On the Island of Lord Horror, Lord Horror: Jewkiller and Lord Horror on the Moon, a trio of transgressive dystopian stories with the eponymous central character based on Nazi collaborator William Joyce, also known as Lord Haw-Haw. These were compiled into a novel-length volume simply titled Lord Horror, intended for distribution in 1990, but many copies of the print run were seized by the Greater Manchester Police in 1989 and not returned, leaving the book rare to this day.

In addition to Lord Horror, Britton was the creator of the characters Meng & Ecker and La Squab. All of these characters appear across various comic books scripted mostly by him as well as a series of sequel novels to Lord Horror, which concluded with his final book Old Death completed in the last months of his life.

== Controversy and legal troubles ==
For twelve months in 1991-1992 Britton's debut novel Lord Horror briefly became the last literary work to be banned under the United Kingdom's Obscene Publications Act. The ruling was later overturned on appeal after a defence led by human rights barrister Geoffrey Robertson. A graphic novel adaptation of the book also remained banned.

Britton served a jail term at HM Prison Manchester in 1982 as a consequence of a 1980 police raid on Savoy and another after the banning of Lord Horror. Speaking on the latter incarceration Britton said that "Lord Horror was so unique and radical, I expected to go to prison for it... Publishers play at promoting dangerous books... All you get is a book vetted by committee, never anything radically imaginative or offensive... Ironically, I think it would do other authors a power of good if they had to account for their books by going to prison -- there are far too many bad books being published!"

== Influence and significance ==
According to Michael Moorcock, the Lord Horror series is the only work of alternate history fiction to "confront Nazism with appropriate originality and passion." Alan Moore is also a notable enthusiast of Britton’s work, having contributed an introduction to one of Britton’s comic collection volumes and included references to the Lord Horror character in his own League of Extraordinary Gentlemen comics.

Literary critic and fellow transgressive author Keith "Supervert" Seward wrote an essay, Horror Panegyric, examining the style and unconventional narrative structure and defending the artistic merit of Britton’s first three novels, comparing them favourably to the work of William Burroughs. Initially published on Seward’s website, Savoy also issued a 2008 Ebook and limited print run containing the essay along with excerpts from the books in question.

== Bibliography of publications involving Britton ==
=== As author/scriptwriter ===
Novels, all published by Savoy:

- Lord Horror (1989/1990) - includes text contributions by Michael Butterworth
- Motherfuckers: The Auschwitz of Oz (1996)
- Baptised in the Blood of Millions - a Novel of Fucking Holocaust Terror (2001)
- La Squab: The Black Rose of Auschwitz (2012)
- Invictus Horror (2013)
- Razor King (Note: listed as Britton’s seventh novel in its official description; counting Invictus Horror as the fifth it is unclear whether the Reverbstorm graphic is the sixth in this chronology, or another unpublished work) (2017)
- Old Death (Note: listed as Britton’s eighth novel in its official description, see previous note) (2022, posthumously published)

Comic books and graphic novels, also all published by Savoy:

- Meng & Ecker #1-9 (1989-95) (Note: "Savoy Comics: Meng & Ecker series"(cited page includes direct links to relevant credits and other information on each individual issue))
- Lord Horror #1 and #3-14 (1989-2000) (Note: "Savoy Comics: Lord Horror series"(cited page includes direct links to relevant credits and other information on issues 1-7)) (Note: "Savoy Comics: Reverbstorm series"(cited page includes direct links to relevant credits and other information on issues 8-14))
- Monoshock (1992)
- The Adventures of Meng & Ecker (1997) - partial collection of strips from Meng & Ecker #1-9 along with new material from the unpublished issues #10 and #11
- Fuck off and Die (2005) - collection of additional Lord Horror and Meng & Ecker comics as well as La Squab comic strips
- Lord Horror: Reverbstorm (2013) - collects Lord Horror #8-14 as well as a final instalment which was never published as a standalone issue

=== As editor ===
Magazine issues - Weird Fantasy, Bognor Regis and Crucified Toad #4 (but not #1) were iterations of the same magazine under different titles

- Weird Fantasy #1 (1969) - also publisher
- Crucified Toad #1 (1970) - co-edited with publisher John Muir; Britton also contributed art
- Weird Fantasy #2 (1971) - also publisher
- Bognor Regis #3 (1972) - also publisher
- Crucified Toad #4 (1974) - also publisher
- New Worlds #215 (1979) - also contributed art

Books:

- The Savoy Book (1978) - collection of fiction, art, interviews and poetry, co-edited with Michael Butterworth
- Savoy Dreams (1984) - collection of fiction, articles, poetry and reviews, co-edited with Michael Butterworth

== Notes and references ==
Notes:

References - Britton's works and publications:

Other references:
