= The Exiles (Space: 1999) =

- Space: 1999 episode
- Episode no.: Series 2 Episode 2
- Directed by: Ray Austin
- Written by: Donald James
- Cinematography by: Frank Watts
- Editing by: Alan Killick
- Production code: SPII 2
- Original air date: 11 September 1976

Guest appearances
- Peter Duncan as Cantar; Stacy Dorning as Zova; Margaret Inglis as Mirella; Vic Armstrong and Frank Maher as Decontamination Technicians; Chai Lee and Vicki Michelle as Alphans

Episode chronology
← Previous "The Metamorph"	Next → "Journey to Where"

"The Exiles" is an episode of the second series of Space: 1999, a 1970s British science fiction television series produced by Gerry Anderson Productions for ITC Entertainment. Written by Donald James and directed by Ray Austin, it was Series 2's second episode to be produced and was filmed at Pinewood Studios in February, March and June 1976.

Opening in 1999, the series follows the crew of lunar colony Moonbase Alpha after a nuclear explosion pushes the Moon out of Earth orbit and into interstellar space. Unable to control the rogue planet's trajectory, the Alphans encounter various astronomical phenomena and alien civilisations as they search for a way back to Earth or a new world to settle on. In "The Exiles", the Alphans rescue a pair of aliens who are adrift in space, only to be taken hostage when the new arrivals decide to use Alpha to further a civil war on their homeworld.

The episode first aired on 11 September 1976 on London Weekend Television and received mixed reviews from commentators.

== Plot ==
A fleet of 53 cylinders approaches the Moon and enters orbit. Believing them to be missiles, the Alphans launch an Eagle to capture one of the objects and land it at a secure laboratory for analysis. During the examination, they detect movement within the cylinder. Fearing they have activated a warhead, they attempt to defuse it by pumping in liquid nitrogen. The cylinder blows open to reveal a male humanoid in suspended animation, vital signs failing.

As the Eagle retrieves another cylinder, the alien is taken to Medical, where he is found to have survived the nitrogen freeze because was in cryonic suspension. Dr Russell's team successfully defibrillate him after increasing the voltage to compensate for a fine insulating membrane covering his skin. On waking, he introduces himself as Cantar of the planet Golos. With his help, the Alphans safely open the second cylinder to reveal his wife, Zova.

The other cylinders carry more of Cantar and Zova's people. After losing a civil war on Golos, they were exiled into space by the planet's despotic new rulers. Unless the cylinders are recovered, they will break up in the Moon's gravity. Commander Koenig refuses to rescue the other Golosians after Russell explains that Alpha's life support is too stretched to absorb so many new arrivals. In return for sanctuary, Cantar and Zova promise to boost Alpha's recycling capacity, and even offer to share the Golosian cryopreservation technology.

Cantar and Zova soon reveal their powerful psychic abilities and the reason for their exile. While working on the life support system, they set off a deafening buzzing which overwhelms the Alphans. They make their way to a power plant, knock out everyone in their way by mere touch, and arm themselves with laser weapons. Then, tapping into Alpha's power, they teleport themselves to Golos, taking Russell and Controller Verdeschi with them. The aliens and their captives materialise in a facility that regulates the planet's biosphere. Pointing his laser, Cantar threatens to destroy the installation – and with it, all life on Golos – unless Ragnar, the leader of his enemies, comes to face him.

On Alpha, Zova says Russell and Verdeschi will be spared if Koenig recovers the other cylinders. To force his cooperation, she telekinetically tortures Russell by crushing a self-sculpture that Russell made of her face, leaving Russell in agony. Koenig launches an Eagle to supervise the recovery operation. As he and Zova prepare to spacewalk, he detaches Zova's lifeline and kills her by pushing her out of the open airlock.

On Golos, Cantar is met not by Ragnar, but his descendant, Chief Councillor Mirella – Cantar and his followers were exiled more than 300 years ago, and Ragnar is long dead. Russell lunges at Cantar and scratches his face, breaking his skin's protective barrier. Cantar takes aim at Russell – but his exposure to Golos' atmosphere causes him to age three centuries in a matter of seconds, and he withers away and dies. Mirella thanks the Alphans for saving her planet, and teleports them back to the Moon. Later, Alpha uses anti-gravity technology to deflect the rest of the cylinders back into space.

== Regular cast ==
- Martin Landau as Commander John Koenig
- Barbara Bain as Dr Helena Russell
- Catherine Schell as Maya
- Tony Anholt as Controller Tony Verdeschi
- Nick Tate as Captain Alan Carter
- Zienia Merton as Sandra Benes
- Anton Phillips as Dr Bob Mathias

== Production and broadcast ==
"The Exiles" was originally written for Space: 1999 Series 1, with Verdeschi's role to be played by either Professor Bergman (Barry Morse) or a recurring character called "Simon Hays". In the original script, the titular exiles had been banished from their homeworld a few decades, rather than centuries, prior.

The episode was filmed primarily between 17 February and 3 March 1976. This coincided with the filming of the Series 2 title sequence, directed by David Lane and Brian Johnson. The episode then had two days of re-shoots on 15 March and 7 June. Filming on the second of these days was directed by Kevin Connor.

The sets for the underground laboratory on Alpha and the control room on Golos were re-dresses of the Psychon caves from the Series 2 opener, "The Metamorph". To distinguish the laboratory set, the crew added props from the Eagle Transporter and Alpha Main Mission sets.

During post-production, Duncan's voice was dubbed by an unidentified American actor. "The Exiles" was first transmitted on 11 September 1976 on London Weekend Television, opposite Part Two of the Doctor Who serial The Masque of Mandragora on BBC1.

== Reception ==
"The Exiles" has had a mixed critical response. John Kenneth Muir was mostly positive in his assessment of the "horrific, atmospheric and tense" episode, which he considered to be among the best of Series 2. He found the story derivative of Series 1's "End of Eternity" but thought that Cantar's demise was "delightfully frightening".

TV Zone considered the episode above average for Series 2, criticising its use of redressed sets but finding Duncan "surprisingly good" as Cantar. A later review for the same magazine found the episode diminished by the dubbing of Duncan and Barbara Bain, which it considered awkward and "unnecessary". However, it also commented that the story has "a decent plot, some solid direction [...] and enough explosions, action and effects for an international market."

SFX magazine rated the episode "B-plus", praising composer Derek Wadsworth's "delightful" incidental music but criticising Duncan's "atrocious" dubbing and the episode's occasionally "crass" dialogue.

DreamWatch Bulletin considered the episode "far from a classic", giving it 3 out of 10. Reviewer Anthony McKay expressed disappointment with the special effects and character portrayals, arguing that many of the regular cast are reduced to "[providing] light relief". He negatively described the story as "a cross between Star Maidens and Fireball XL5".
