= Don LaFontaine =

American voice actor (1940–2008)

- Don LaFontaine in 2007
- Born: Donald LeRoy LaFontaine; August 26, 1940; Duluth, Minnesota, U.S.
- Died: September 1, 2008 (aged 68); Los Angeles, California, U.S.
- Resting place: Hollywood Forever Cemetery, Los Angeles
- Other names: Thunder Throat; The Voice of God; The King of Movie Trailers
- Occupation: Voice actor
- Years active: 1962–2008
- Spouse: Nita Whitaker
- Children: 3

Donald LeRoy LaFontaine (August 26, 1940 – September 1, 2008) was an American voice actor who recorded more than 5,000 film trailers and hundreds of thousands of television advertisements, network promotions, and video game trailers over four decades.

He became identified with the phrase "In a world ...", used in so many movie trailers that it became a humorous catchphrase. Widely known in the film industry, the man whose nicknames included "Thunder Throat", "The Voice of God" and "The King of Movie Trailers", became known to a wider audience in the U.S. through commercials for GEICO insurance and the Mega Millions lottery game.

== Early life ==
LaFontaine was born on August 26, 1940, in Duluth, Minnesota, to Alfred and Ruby LaFontaine (née Dravland; b. 1918). LaFontaine said his voice cracked at age 13 in mid-sentence, giving him the bass tones that later brought him much fame and success. After graduating from Duluth Central High School in 1958, he enlisted in the U.S. Army and served as an audio engineer with the U.S. Army Band and the U.S. Army Chorus.

== Career ==
LaFontaine continued to work as a recording engineer after discharge and began working at the National Recording Studios in New York City, where, in 1962, he had the opportunity to work with producer Floyd Peterson on radio spots for Dr. Strangelove. Peterson incorporated many of LaFontaine's ideas for the spots and, in 1963, they went into business together producing advertising exclusively for the movie industry. LaFontaine claimed that this company first came up with many of the famous movie trailer catchphrases, including his own future signature phrase "In a world ...".

While working on the 1964 western Gunfighters of Casa Grande, LaFontaine had to fill in for an unavailable voice actor to have something to present to MGM. After MGM bought the spots, LaFontaine began a career as a voiceover artist.

He became the head of Kaleidoscope Films Ltd., a movie trailer production company, before starting his own company, Don LaFontaine Associates, in 1976. Shortly thereafter, he was hired by Paramount to do their trailers and was eventually promoted to vice president. He decided to get back into trailer work and left Paramount, moving to Los Angeles in 1981. LaFontaine was contacted by an agent who wanted to promote him for voiceover work, and from then on worked in voiceovers. At his peak, he voiced about 60 promotions a week, and sometimes as many as 35 in a single day. Once he established himself, most studios were willing to pay a high fee for his service. His income was in the millions.

LaFontaine often had jobs at several different studios each day. With the advent of ISDN technology, LaFontaine eventually built a recording studio in his Hollywood Hills home and began doing his work from home.

LaFontaine lent his distinctive voice to thousands of movie trailers during his career, spanning every genre from every major film studio, including The Cannon Group, for which he voiced one of their logos (he also voiced the Viacom closing logo in 1990, simply saying the company's name after it had been formed on the screen). For a time, LaFontaine had a near-monopoly on movie trailer voiceovers. Some notable trailers which LaFontaine highlighted in the intro on his official website include: Terminator 2: Judgment Day, Shrek, Friday the 13th, Law & Order and Batman Returns. LaFontaine stated in 2007 that his favorite work in a movie trailer was for the biographical film The Elephant Man, though according to a response to the question on his website, he had several trailers which stood out in his mind, and he didn't like to choose one.

Lafontaine also did announcing for a few WWE Pay Per View events, as well as the "Don't Try This at Home" bumper and the opening narration for the television shows Team Knight Rider, Renegade and Rambo: The Force of Freedom.

In a 2007 interview, LaFontaine explained the strategy behind his signature catchphrase "In a world where ...":

We have to very rapidly establish the world we are transporting them to. That's very easily done by saying, "In a world where..." You very rapidly set the scene.

LaFontaine also did other voice work, including as the announcer for the newscasts on WCBS-TV New York, from 2000 to 2001, narrator of The Making of Star Wars documentary from 1977 and the television shows The Third Eye, World's Most Amazing Videos, Boot Camp, America's Most Wanted, Beyond Belief: Fact or Fiction and Fillmore!. LaFontaine was a recurring guest narrator for clues on the game show Jeopardy! and appeared on NPR's Wait Wait... Don't Tell Me! on May 14, 2005, where he played "Not My Job" (a game in which famous people must accurately answer questions unrelated to their chosen professions). The prize (for a listener, not the contestant) is "Carl Kasell's voice on your home answering machine". LaFontaine did not win the game and offered to record the listener's answering machine message himself. LaFontaine once claimed that he enjoyed recording messages like these because it allowed him to be creative in writing unique messages and said that he would do so for anyone who contacted him if he had the time. By 2007, he found the requests to be too numerous for him to take on and stopped providing the service.

In 2006, GEICO began an advertising campaign in which actual customers told their own stories of GEICO experiences, accompanied by a celebrity who helped them make the story interesting. LaFontaine was featured as the celebrity in one of these ads which began airing in August 2006. In the commercial, he was introduced by the voice-over as "that announcer guy from the movies", with his name printed on-screen to identify him. He began his telling of the customer's story with his trademark "In a world ...". LaFontaine credited the spot as life-changing for having exposed his name and face to a significant audience, noting, "There goes any anonymity I might have had ...".

== Health and death ==
On Friday, August 22, 2008, LaFontaine, an off-and-on smoker who had quit 20 years earlier, was admitted to Cedars-Sinai Medical Center in Los Angeles, with a pulmonary embolism and was reported to be in critical condition the following Tuesday. His family made a public appeal for prayers on Mediabistro. On September 1, 2008, six days after his 68th birthday and ten days after his hospitalization, LaFontaine died following complications from a pneumothorax. He is buried at Hollywood Forever Cemetery. His final television voice over role was for the Phineas and Ferb episode "The Chronicles of Meap" in which he said in his final line: "In a world ... There, I said it. Happy?" The episode also ended with a short tribute to him, although the iTunes, UK, Spanish, and Disney+ versions of the episode omitted the dedication. His final movie trailer voice-over was for Call + Response, a documentary about the global slave trade, for which he donated his talent.

== Legacy ==
After his death, voice-overs in film trailers became rare, with most trailers now relying on music, sound effects, and dialogue taken from the film.

== See also ==
- Ben Patrick Johnson
- Hal Douglas
- Mark Elliott
- Nick Tate
- Percy Rodriguez
- Redd Pepper
