= Space Warp (Space: 1999) =

- Space: 1999 episode
- Episode no.: Series 2 Episode 14
- Directed by: Peter Medak
- Written by: "Charles Woodgrove"; (Fred Freiberger)
- Cinematography by: Frank Watts
- Editing by: Mike Campbell
- Production code: SPII 15
- Original air date: 2 December 1976

Cast
- Martin Landau as Commander John Koenig; Barbara Bain as Dr Helena Russell; Catherine Schell as Maya; Tony Anholt as Controller Tony Verdeschi; Nick Tate as Captain Alan Carter; Zienia Merton as Sandra Benes; Jeffery Kissoon as Dr Ben Vincent; Trevor Thomas as Eagle pilot Gary; Andrew Lodge as the alien captain; Tony Osoba and Jack Klaff as security guards; Terry Walsh as a technician

Episode chronology
← Previous "Catacombs of the Moon"	Next → "A Matter of Balance"

"Space Warp" is an episode of the second series of Space: 1999, a 1970s British science fiction television series produced by Gerry Anderson Productions for ITC Entertainment. Written by producer Fred Freiberger (using the pseudonym "Charles Woodgrove") and directed by Peter Medak, it was filmed at Pinewood Studios in August 1976 and first broadcast by Associated Television on 2 December 1976.

Opening in 1999, the series follows the crew of lunar colony Moonbase Alpha after a nuclear explosion pushes the Moon out of Earth orbit and into interstellar space. Unable to control the rogue planet's trajectory, the Alphans encounter various astronomical phenomena and alien civilisations as they search for a way back to Earth or a new world to settle on. In "Space Warp", Commander Koenig and Controller Verdeschi are away from Alpha when the Moon is suddenly caught in a cosmic anomaly that hurls it light-years through space. As Koenig and Verdeschi work out a way home, the rest of Alpha struggles to contain the shapeshifting science officer Maya, who has developed a fever that causes her to take on a series of monstrous alien forms.

The episode has received negative reviews from commentators. It was later paired with the Series 2 opener, "The Metamorph", to create the Space: 1999 compilation film Cosmic Princess, released by ITC in 1982.

== Plot ==
The Moon encounters a derelict spacecraft. Commander Koenig and Controller Verdeschi set off in an Eagle to investigate. On Alpha, Psychon shapeshifter Maya has developed a mysterious fever which is proving resistant to all medications. She keeps having terrifying visions of her father Mentor and the destruction of planet Psychon.

Without warning, the Moon falls into a space warp that hurls it across the cosmos, throwing Alpha into disarray and leaving Koenig and Verdeschi stranded. Maya cries out to an imagined Mentor that "it's happening again!" When the Moon re-enters normal space, the Eagle and the derelict ship are light‑years away. Koenig and Verdeschi, low on fuel and unable to locate the threshold of the space warp, dock with the ship in the hope of finding a way home.

On Alpha, Maya tells Dr Russell she cannot keep "molecular control", and is put in restraints. Nevertheless, she breaks out of Medical and transforms into an aggressive, humanoid, reptilian animal. Attempts to tranquillise the Maya-creature appear unsuccessful, and it proceeds to the Eagle launch area. Russell believes it is attempting to return to Psychon. The creature boards an Eagle and starts the launch sequence. Captain Carter confronts the creature just as the tranquilliser starts to take effect. They fight for control of the Eagle and it crashes in the hangar, seriously injuring the creature.

Russell realises the Maya-creature is dying, and due to its unknown physiology, there is nothing she can do. She begs it to revert to Maya's true form, but instead it changes again: first into a male Psychon warrior, and then into a frog-headed humanoid, before escaping for a second time.

Activating the computer aboard the ship, Koenig and Verdeschi discover that it too was caught and stranded by the space warp. Although the long-dead crew managed to locate the threshold, the ship was too badly damaged to make a return journey. To get home, Koenig and Verdeschi must connect a locator to the Eagle and network the ships' computers. The link-up is completed and the Eagle receives the necessary coordinates. Still docked with the ship, Koenig and Verdeschi set a course for the threshold.

On Alpha, the Maya-creature is about to tear through an airlock and cause an explosive decompression. The Medical staff allow it inside so they can trap it, but their anaesthetic proves useless and the creature, unaffected by the vacuum of space, exits onto the lunar surface. Russell and Carter set out in a buggy to retrieve Maya before she changes back and suffocates. The creature attacks Russell but is knocked unconscious by Carter. All three return to Alpha.

As Russell pleads with Maya to change back, Maya's fever vanishes and sensors detect the Eagle and the derelict emerging from the space warp. Radioing Alpha, Koenig requests Maya's help in analysing the derelict's systems. Verdeschi casually remarks that little could have happened while they were away. Wryly, Russell replies that "nothing has been going on" at Alpha.

== Production ==
As scripted, the alien captain was potentially to have a head similar to a grasshopper's. For budget reasons, this idea was dropped in favour of a simpler mask made of acrylic. Despite this, the character is still named "Grasshopper" in the end credits. Originally all three of Maya's transformed states were to be alien monsters, but the second of these was changed to an armoured Psychon male (played by stuntman Dinny Powell, brother of Nosher Powell). The frog-headed creature was a re-use of the alien costume worn by David Prowse in "The Beta Cloud", with new paint and a wig.

"Space Warp" was filmed at Pinewood Studios over 13 days in August 1976. It was one of Series 2's "double-up" episodes: stories written to sideline different members of the regular cast so that they could be shot in pairs, simultaneously on different stages. This was intended to shorten the series' filming schedule and prevent it from going over-time and over-budget, like Series 1. The principal photography of "Space Warp" coincided with that of "A Matter of Balance"; to allow the episodes to film in tandem, characters Dr Russell and Captain Carter were given reduced roles in "A Matter of Balance", giving actors Barbara Bain and Nick Tate more screen time in "Space Warp".

While filming a scene in which the transformed Maya hurls Carter across a room, Tate's stuntman dislocated a shoulder and lost two front teeth. The scale model of the alien ship first appeared as the Archanon vessel in "The Mark of Archanon". The Moon buggy prop was an adapted Amphicat.

== Reception ==
"Space Warp" was negatively received by commentators. James F. Iaccino of Benedictine University considered it one of several "really bad" episodes that "only concentrated on chases and fistfights" and damaged the series' reputation. Dreamwatch magazine rated it 4 out of 10, praising the acting, special effects and direction but describing the story as a "typically idiotic script by Freiberger". It added that "anything resembling a story must surely be by accident", while the creatures Maya changes into "look like Spinal Tap rockers with acne". SFX magazine gave the episode a "D" grade, calling the Eagle crash "spectacular" but the overall episode another of Freiberger's "runarounds".

John Kenneth Muir compared "Space Warp" unfavourably to another science fiction episode about "a sick crew member causing havoc": Star Trek: The Original Series' "Amok Time". Calling Freiberger's script an "embarrassing amalgam of science fiction clichés" with "plot contrivances and silliness galore", he criticised the story's emphasis on "mindless action", arguing that it underused the cast's talents. He found the script inferior to ones by other Space: 1999 writers, remarking that "[s]urely Johnny Byrne or Christopher Penfold could have offered a more intelligent story than what is essentially an hour of Maya transforming into gorillas and horned frog-monsters!"
