= Michael Butterworth (author) =

British author, publisher and campaigner

- Born: 1947 (age 78–79)
- Occupation: Author
- Known for: Savoy Books
- Website: michael-butterworth.co.uk

Michael Butterworth (born 1947) is a British author, publisher and campaigner who first became known publicly as an author of New Wave science fiction. He later founded the publishing house Savoy Books with David Britton in 1976 and the contemporary art journal Corridor8 with Sarajane Inkster in 2009. He successfully fought a charge of obscenity against Britton's controversial novel Lord Horror during 1992, the first novel to be banned in England since Hubert Selby Jr.'s Last Exit to Brooklyn in 1967.

== Career ==
Butterworth started his writing career in 1966 for New Worlds Magazine, the main British magazine featuring New Wave literature, edited by Michael Moorcock and later Charles Platt. His work for this and various New Wave anthologies shares similarities with his contemporaries, including J G Ballard, who collaborated with him on two works of fiction, and William S. Burroughs whom he was later to commission and publish.

His publishing career began during 1968 with the small press literary magazines Concentrate, Corridor and Wordworks with Jay Jeff Jones as associate editor. At this time he was, additionally, a contributor of fiction and poetry to many small press publications.

Butterworth met David Britton during the early 1970s by means of the latter's Manchester-based bookshop The House on the Borderland. After a deal was made with New English Library, Savoy's early titles were distributed worldwide. The company's models were the fin de siècle magazine The Savoy (hence the name), New Worlds and Weird Tales, and for production style the British publisher Picador and the American houses Ace Books and Lancer Books. The company's initial intent was to release titles in trade format editions by authors that Butterworth & Britton wanted to see kept in print, after which the company began creating its own titles. Savoy Books is one of Michael Moorcock's principle independent publishers.

After the decrease of popularity of New Wave products, and seeking to support his young family as a single parent, during 1976 Butterworth began a series of fantasy and television tie-in commissions. The first of these, The Time of the Hawklords, was a fantasy novel categorised as being in the space-rock genre, based on the stage personas of the rock band Hawkwind. A sequel, The Queens of Deliria, was completed in 1977. Both books were co-credited to Michael Moorcock, who has said that his involvement with the first was negligible and that he had no involvement with the second at all. A third novel in the Hawklords trilogy is Ledge of Darkness illustrated by Bob Walker; this was only available as part of a Hawkwind 4 LP retrospective box set '25 Years On' in 1994, which never got proper distribution. He wrote novelizations of the second series of the TV show Space:1999 for ITC Entertainment. This process was frustrated by, having just three weeks to write each novel, access to only four of the scripts and only the prescreening of the first episode.

During 1978 Butterworth co-edited (with Britton) The Savoy Book, an anthology of prose and graphics. Around this time he also became friends with Ian Curtis of Joy Division, through Curtis's interest in William Burroughs. The friendship was to have a bearing on his subsequent career.

From 1980 to 1997, 'clean-up' campaigner Police Chief Constable of Manchester, James Anderton, targeted Savoy Books and their Manchester-based retail outlets. Multiple raids were made, with charges of obscenity being brought against the company and its directors. Butterworth retaliated, his intent being to bring to wider attention what he claimed was the misuse of Section Three of the Obscene Publications Act, by which publications of literary merit were being seized and destroyed without a jury trial. This did not, however, prevent Britton being sentenced to twenty-eight days in Strangeways Prison, Manchester, in May 1982, the first of two such jail sentences Britton received for publishing books. Nor did it prevent the eventual destruction of thousands of graphic editions of Lord Horror and Meng & Ecker seized by the police during related raids. The appeal of these was hampered by the prosecution's plea of Public Interest Immunity when the defence asked them to say why they thought Butterworth & Britton were not serious publishers. The sitting magistrate, Janet Hayward, allowed the plea. As against a 'disreputable publishing house', therefore, a jury trial was disallowed and the charge of obscenity was sustained. The charge was then sustained at appeal, in the Divisional Courts in London.

During 1984, Butterworth co-edited Savoy Dreams (again with Britton), a sequel to The Savoy Book. This contained, as well as fiction and graphics, Butterworth's account of the police activity and court case resulting in Britton's first imprisonment.

In 1989, Butterworth contributed to, and edited, Britton's very controversial novel Lord Horror. Featuring a parody of Chief Constable Anderton, the book was quickly seized by police. It was found obscene at the novel's trial in 1991. The case was contested by Butterworth, who sought the help of human rights organisation Article 19. In July 1992, at a court of appeal, the charge was overturned, with a defence directed by Geoffrey Robertson QC.

From 1989 (to present), Butterworth has been the editor of all Britton's Lord Horror novels as well as the Lord Horror graphic spin-offs and Meng & Ecker graphic series.

In 2006, while continuing to co-manage Savoy Books, Butterworth re-established his independent credentials, experimenting first with print-on-demand using the imprint Michael Butterworth Books. During the same year, at the request of Space 1999 publisher and fan Mateo Latosa he rewrote his novelisations of the television series Space 1999: Year Two, revising and re-ordering the stories to bring them into concordance with the broadcast series and making a consistent Space:1999 universe. The collection included a novelisation of the episode, "The Taybor", which had not been included in the original books. The omnibus edition was published as a limited edition hardcover by Powys Media.

From 2011, he has been contributing short fiction and poetry to Emanations, the annual anthology edited by Carter Kaplan and published by International Authors.

From August to 5 September 2014, Butterworth staged the exhibition Use and Abuse of Books.

During 2016 Butterworth began a series of memoirs. The first, "The Blue Monday Diaries: In the Studio With New Order", is an account of his time spent with the band in the early nineteen-eighties. The book also contains a picture of alternate Manchester at that time. Other volumes are planned to follow.

=== Novels ===
- The Time of the Hawklords (1976; co-credited to Michael Moorcock)
- Queens of Deliria (1977; co-credited to Michael Moorcock)
- Ledge of Darkness (1995; graphic novel illustrated by Bob Walker)

Space:1999 Year Two novelizations

- Planets of Peril (1977)
- Mind-Breaks of Space (1977, with J. Jeff Jones)
- The Space-Jackers (1977)
- The Psychomorph (1977)
- The Time Fighters (1977)
- The Edge of the Infinite (1977)
- Space:1999 Year Two Omnibus (2006) Powys Media – compilation and revision of original novelizations

=== Anthologies edited ===
- The Savoy Book (1978) (with David Britton)
- Savoy Dreams (1984) (with David Britton)

=== Contributions ===
- Lord Horror by David Britton (1989, Savoy Books) – editor and provides text

== Personal life ==
Butterworth is vegan. In 2012, he lived in central Manchester.
