= Catherine Schell =

Hungarian-born actress (born 1944)

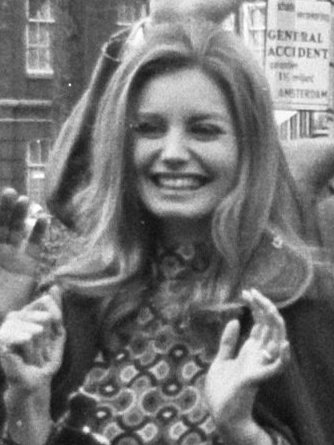
- Schell in 1967
- Born: Katherina Freiin Schell von Bauschlott; 17 July 1944 (age 82); Budapest, Hungary
- Other names: Catherine von Schell; Katherina von Schell; Katherine von Schell
- Education: Otto Falckenberg School of the Performing Arts
- Occupation: Actress
- Years active: 1964–2004; 2020–present
- Known for: On Her Majesty's Secret Service (1969); The Return of the Pink Panther (1975)
- Television: Doctor Who; Space: 1999
- Spouses: William Marlowe (m. 1968; div. 1977) Bill Hays (m. 1982; died 2006)
- Parent(s): Baron Paul Schell von Bauschlott; Countess Katharina Maria Etelka Georgina Elisabeth Teleki de Szék

Catherine Schell (born Katherina Freiin Schell von Bauschlott, 17 July 1944) is a Hungarian-born British actress who came to prominence in British film and television productions from the 1960s. Her notable roles include the Bond girl Nancy in On Her Majesty's Secret Service (1969), Lady Claudine Litton in The Return of the Pink Panther (1975), Countess Scarlioni in the Doctor Who serial City of Death (1979), and a regular role as Maya in Year Two of the television series Space: 1999 (1976–1977).

== Early life ==
Schell's father, Baron Pál Schell von Bauschlott (5 September 1898 in Nagyida – 20 October 1979 in Munich), was a Hungarian diplomat of three-quarter Hungarian ancestry; her mother (m. Budapest, 28 January 1940) was Countess Katalin Mária Etelka Georgina Erzsébet Teleki de Szék (11 November 1917 in Budapest – ?). "Schell" is the family name, while "von Bauschlott" indicates the place in Germany where the Schell family owned its main estate (formerly an independent village, now part of the combined municipality of Neulingen).

Fleeing Hungary in advance of the Soviets and communism, the family lived in poverty until 1948, finding asylum in Austria: first in Vienna, then in Salzburg. In 1950, the family emigrated to the United States, where Schell's father acquired American citizenship.

Schell entered a convent school in the New York City borough of Staten Island. In 1957, her father joined Radio Free Europe and the family moved to Munich where Schell developed an interest in acting and attended the Otto Falckenberg School of the Performing Arts.

== Career ==
=== Film ===
She acted under the alternative name "Catherina von Schell" early in her career. Under this name she made her film debut as the title character in the German-language film Lana, Queen of the Amazons (1964). She appeared as Bond girl Nancy in the James Bond film On Her Majesty's Secret Service (1969), with George Lazenby in the lead. Around the same time, she appeared in Hammer Films science-fiction thriller Moon Zero Two (also 1969) cast in the role of Clementine Taplin. She appeared, now credited as Catherine Schell, with Bette Davis in Madame Sin (1972), a television film made by ITC which was released theatrically in some markets.

Schell appeared opposite Peter Sellers in the comedy The Return of the Pink Panther (1975) as Lady Claudine Lytton. Schell appeared with Sellers again in The Prisoner of Zenda (1979), one of his last films.

=== Television ===
Schell's first TV credit was Till Eulenspiegel (1967), a West German comedy in which she played Nele and was billed as Katherina von Schell.

Schell spent much of her career in British television, appearing in more than 47 series spanning a period of nearly 30 years. She played regular roles in series such as The Adventurer, Looking For Clancy, One by One, Mog and Wish Me Luck, in addition to many guest appearances, including The Persuaders! (starring alongside future James Bond actor Roger Moore), The Troubleshooters, Arthur of the Britons, Return of the Saint, The Sweeney, The Onedin Line, The Gentle Touch, Lovejoy, Bergerac, The Bill, Howards' Way and The Search for the Nile.

Schell appeared in the science-fiction series Space: 1999 as a robotic servant ("Guardian of Piri", 1975), and returned to the series in its second season as the regular character Maya, a shape-shifting "metamorph" from the planet Psychon. Schell appeared in another British science-fiction series, as Countess Scarlioni in the Doctor Who serial City of Death (1979).

== Personal life ==
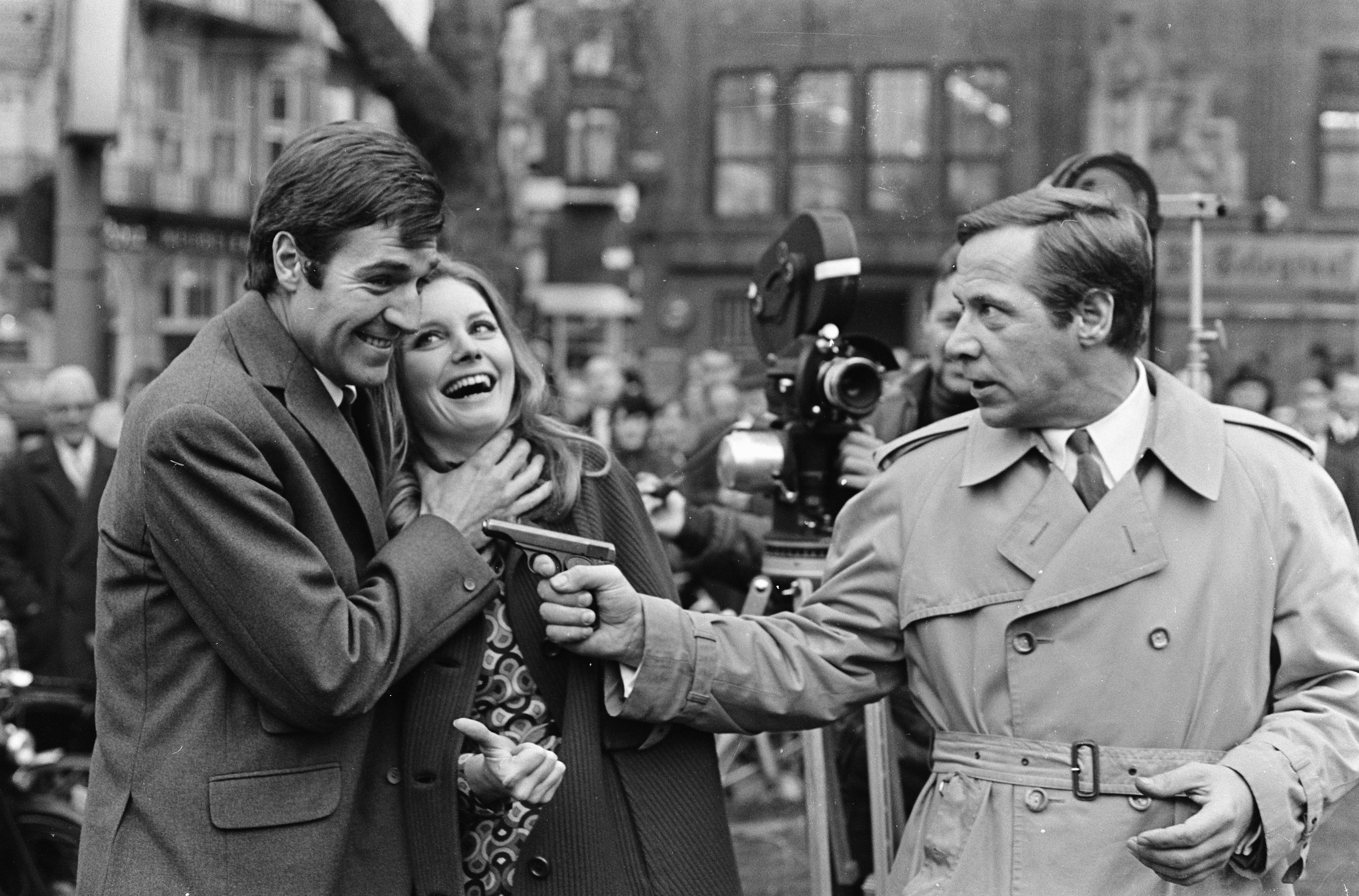
Publicity Still for Amsterdam Affair, Guido de Moor (left) pretends to choke Catharine von Schell (center), as Piet Römer (right) threatens Guido de Moor with a gun, on Rembrandtplein in central Amsterdam, on 15 November 1967

=== Marriages ===
While filming Amsterdam Affair in 1968, Schell met and married her first husband, British actor William Marlowe (1930–2003), and moved to London. The marriage ended in divorce in 1977.

Schell married director Bill Hays (1938–2006) in 1982. In 1984, they worked together for the first time as husband and wife on a TV production of Ivan Turgenev's play A Month in the Country.

=== Retirement ===
Schell's career continued into the mid-1990s, after which she retired from acting and in 1996, opened Valentin, a small guesthouse (fr:Auberge) in Bonneval, Haute-Loire, France.

In September 2000, in New York City, Schell made her first convention appearance at MainMission: 2000, a celebration of the 25th anniversary of Space: 1999. To date, she has appeared at only one other convention, mainly due to the declining health of her second husband Bill Hays (1938–2006).

In 2010, Schell contributed a foreword to the Space: 1999 novel Born for Adversity, written by David McIntee and published by Powys Media.

In 2016, the first part of Schell's autobiography, A Constant Alien ISBN 978-1-78196-161-2 was published. In 2018, the second part of Schell's autobiography, When God Was Out For Lunch ISBN 978-1-78196-311-1, was published.

Around 2020, Schell came out of acting retirement to portray the Grand Duchess Valeria in the BBC One/Netflix series Dracula, which aired in 2020.

Around 2022, Schell came out of acting retirement to portray Zoya Krupp, the Count's Romani ex-wife, in The Munsters, a horror comedy film produced, written, and directed by Rob Zombie.

As of 2022, Schell resides in France.

== Filmography ==
=== Film ===
Year	Title	Role	Notes
1964	Lana, Queen of the Amazons	Queen Lana	
1964	Traitor's Gate	Hope Joyner	
1967	Hell Is Empty	Catherine Grant	
1968	Assignment K	Maggi	Uncredited
1968	Amsterdam Affair	Sophie Ray	
1969	Moon Zero Two	Clementine Taplin	Credited as Catherina von Schell
1969	On Her Majesty's Secret Service	Nancy	
1972	Madame Sin	Barbara	
1974	The Black Windmill	Lady Melissa Julyan	
1974	Callan	Jenny	
1975	The Return of the Pink Panther	Lady Claudine Litton	
1977	Gulliver's Travels	Mary	
1978	Exposure	Caroline	
1978	Destination: Moonbase Alpha	Maya	Originally Space: 1999 2-part episode "The Bringers of Wonder"
1979	The Prisoner of Zenda	Antoinette	
1982	The Island of Adventure	Alison Mannering	
1982	Cosmic Princess	Maya	Originally Space: 1999 episodes "The Metamorph" and "Space Warp"
1983	On the Third Day	Clarissa Hammond	
1988	On the Black Hill	Lotte Zons	
1990	The March	Noelle Epps	
1993	Pretty Princess	Countess Von Dix	
2022	The Munsters	Zoya Krupp	

=== Television ===
Year	Title	Role	Notes
1967	Till Eulenspiegel	Nele	Unknown episodes
1970	Omnibus	Lunia	Episode: "A Requiem for Modigliani"
1971	Paul Temple	Uschi Baumann	Episode: "Death of Fasching"
1971	The Troubleshooters	Kirsten Hansen	2 episodes
1971	The Search for the Nile	Florence Baker	2 episodes
1971	The Persuaders!	Kristin Hansen	Episode: "The Morning After"
1972	A Family at War	Erika	Episode: "Two Fathers"
1972–1973	The Adventurer	Diane Marsh	11 episodes
1973	The Rivals of Sherlock Holmes	Maria Wolkinski	Episode: "The Sensible Action of Lieutenant Holst"
1973	Arthur of the Britons	Benedicta	Episode: "The Girl from Rome"
1974	Napoleon and Love	Marie Walewska	4 episodes
1974	Dial M for Murder	Helen	Episode: "Contract"
1974	The Double Dealers	The Double Dealers	Episode: "An Ad in The Times"
1975	The Sweeney	Stella Goodman	Episode: "Big Spender"
1975	Thriller	Julie	Episode: "The Next Voice You See"
1975	Looking for Clancy	Penny Clancy	4 episodes
1975	Space: 1999	Servant of the Guardian	Episode: "Guardian of Piri"
1976	Play of the Month	Mabel Dancy	Episode: "Loyalties"
1976–1977	Space: 1999	Maya	23 episodes
1977	Supernatural	Theresa	Episode: "Viktoria"
1978	The Onedin Line	Hannah Webster	Episode: "The Reverend's Daughter"
1978	Return of the Saint	Samantha	Episode: "The Imprudent Professor"
1979	Doctor Who	Countess Scarlioni	Serial: "City of Death"
1980	The Gentle Touch	Margot	Episode: "Melody"
1980–1981	The Spoils of War	Paula Brandt	11 episodes
1980	Sherlock Holmes and Doctor Watson	Lady Sylvia Tarleton	Episode: "The Case of the Deadly Tower"
1982	Strangers	Sophy Paget-Lombardi	Episode: "A Swift and Evil Rozzer"
1983	Bergerac	Veronique	Episode: "Prime Target"
1983	Agatha Christie's Partners in Crime	Virma La Strange	Episode: "The Ambassador's Boots"
1985	One by One	Lady Ann Pendle	6 episodes
1985–1986	Mog	Mrs. Mortenson	All 13 episodes
1985	A Month in the Country	Lizaveta	TV film
1985	My Brother Jonathan	Mrs. Martyn	Episode: #1.1
1988	Screen Two	Melena Lotskova	Episode: "Border"
1989	The Bill	Mrs. Stern	Episode: Silver Lining"
1989	Howards' Way	Yvette Studer	Episode: #5.10
1990	Wish Me Luck	Virginia Mitchell	8 episodes
1991	Lovejoy	Francis Beauchamp	Episode: "Raise the Hispanic"
1992	Moon and Son	Mrs. Milestone	Episode: "Nearly Dearly Departed"
1993	Screen Two	Marie-Claire	Episode: "The Clothes in the Wardrobe"
1994	The Wimbledon Poisoner	Mrs. Gunther	Both 2 episodes
1995	Tales of Mystery and Imagination	Lady Montresor	Episode: "The Cask of Amontillado"
1996	The Knock	Inspector Helene Masson	2 episodes
2020	Dracula	Grand Duchess Valeria	Episode: "Blood Vessel"
