= Nick Tate =

Australian actor (born 1942)

- Born: Nicholas John Tate; 18 June 1942 (age 84); Sydney, Australia
- Occupation: Actor
- Years active: 1959–present
- Known for: Space: 1999 as Alan Carter; Sons and Daughters as James Hamilton
- Spouse: Hazel Butterfield (m. 1977)
- Children: 2
- Parents: John Tate (father); Neva Carr Glyn (mother)
- Website: nicktate.com

Nicholas John Tate (born 18 June 1942) is an Australian actor. He is known for his extensive film work as well as roles as pilot Alan Carter in the 1970s science fiction series Space: 1999 and James Hamilton in the 1980s soap opera Sons and Daughters. He has also had a successful voiceover career in movie trailers, animation and video games.

== Early life ==
Tate was born on 18 June 1942 in Sydney, New South Wales. His parents were the actors John Tate and Neva Carr Glyn. His maternal grandparents were also actors, originally from Ireland and Great Britain, who performed in vaudeville. His father, of Russian descent, also had a connection to the works of Space: 1999 creator Gerry Anderson, being a secondary voice actor in Thunderbirds.

Tate grew up amongst parties and opening nights and was often backstage while his parents performed in the theatre. He acted in all his school plays, before being scouted by the Sydney Opera Company to play Amahl in Menotti’s light opera Amahl and the Night Visitors.

At the age of 12, Tate's parents separated. That same year, as an avid surfer, he joined Mona Vale Surf Lifesaving Club, where actor Rod Taylor had been in the boat crew in the 1940s.

== Career ==
Wanting to direct, Tate joined the Australian Broadcasting Commission (ABC), which was preparing for the start of television in Australia. A television role as the singing telegram boy in Thornton Wilder’s The Skin of Our Teeth prompted Tate to quit school. He graduated from studio hand to assistant director, while working on a variety of series. In 1964, he joined an actors' workshop because his interest had turned to acting but, unsure of what direction to take, he joined the Australian commandos for a year. Eventually, his surfing skills afforded him a lead role as a surfer in the thriller miniseries The Purple Jacaranda.

Tate's big break came with a lead role in the award-winning Australian television series My Brother Jack, followed by a stage production of the musical The Canterbury Tales, in which he played 'Nicholas the Gallant' for eighteen months on tour throughout the country. That was followed by the 1970 Australian television series Dynasty about a rich, powerful family, where he joined his father John Tate for the first time on screen – the two playing father and son.

Tate portrayed astronaut Alan Carter in the British science fiction series Space: 1999, which was broadcast from 1975 to 1977, though the series began production in late 1973. There were plans to replace Alan Carter for Space: 1999's second series, but examination of the fan mail showed he was one of the show's most popular characters, so Tate was retained through the end of its run. In 1976, he broke through in film with an AACTA award-winning role in the movie The Devil's Playground. He continued to work in film with supporting roles in a number of theatrical films, including The Year My Voice Broke, Richard Attenborough's Cry Freedom, Return from the River Kwai, Evil Angels, and Steven Spielberg's Hook. From 1985 to 1986, he portrayed James Hamilton in the Australian soap opera Sons and Daughters.

Tate has also made guest appearances on numerous American TV shows, such as The X-Files; Dr. Quinn, Medicine Woman; Star Trek: The Next Generation (in the 1990 episode "Final Mission"); Murder, She Wrote; Star Trek: Deep Space Nine (in the 1998 episode "Honor Among Thieves"); Farscape and in the Lost episode "Tabula Rasa".

On stage, Tate appeared in the TRIP (Tony Rud Ingrid Pitt Productions) stage production of Duty Free (later known as Don't Bother to Dress), by Emmerdale writer Neville Siggs, which ran from 1976 to 1977 at the Bristol Hippodrome. In 2006, he played the leading role of Captain Edward J. Smith in the Australian premiere of the musical Titanic.

Tate is also known for his voice-over work in Hollywood theatrical trailers, for such films as Jurassic Park, Braveheart, Schindler's List, Austin Powers, Deep Impact, Independence Day, GoldenEye, Tomorrow Never Dies, The World Is Not Enough, Double Jeopardy and The SpongeBob SquarePants Movie, and clip-on bumpers for Sony Pictures Home Entertainment from 2005–2006. He has also voiced commercials for Lexus, Kodak and HP, and Guinness beer spots airing from 2006. Tate and four other well-known voice artists (Don LaFontaine, John Leader, Mark Elliot, and Al Chalk) parodied their individual voice-over styles en route to an awards show in a 1997 short film, 5 Men and a Limo. He has also performed voice-over work in various video games, including the role of antagonist Prince Xizor in Star Wars: Shadows of the Empire, and the voice for the Australian tycoon Ozzie Mandrill in Escape from Monkey Island.

== Personal life ==
Tate married Hazel Butterfield at Dulwich College Chapel, UK in September 1977, and their son Thomas was born in 1979. They moved to Australia in 1981, where they had a second child, Jessie Josephine, in 1986. Through Tom and Jessie, they have three grandchildren.

Tate also has a keen interest in technical drawing and carpentry, and has designed and built seven of his family homes.

== Awards ==
Year	Work	Award	Category	Result
1976	The Devil's Playground	Australian Film Institute Award	Best Actor in a Lead Role	Won

== Filmography ==
=== Film ===
Year	Title	Role	Type
1959	The Skin of Our Teeth	Telegraph Boy	TV movie
1959	Turn of the Road		Short
1966	A Man for All Seasons	Master at Arms (uncredited)	Feature film
1968	Submarine X-1	Leading Seaman X-1	Feature film
1968	Nobody Runs Forever	Sir James' Assistant (uncredited)	Feature film
1969	The Oblong Box	Young Man in Tavern (uncredited)	Feature film
1969	Battle of Britain	RAF Pilot (uncredited)	Feature film
1973	Chaser	Sam Larcom	TV movie
1976	The Day After Tomorrow (aka Into Infinity)	Captain Harry Masters	TV movie
1976	The Devil's Playground	Brother Victor	Feature film
1977	The Strange Case of the End of Civilisation as We Know It	1st Australian	Feature film
1977	Summerfield	Simon Robinson	Feature film
1979	Undercover Lover (aka Licensed to Love and Kill)	Jensen Fury	Feature film
1982	Cosmic Princess	Alan Carter	TV movie
1984	The Coolangatta Gold	Joe Lucas	Feature film
1985	The Empty Beach	Brian Henneberry	Feature film
1986	Ivanhoe	Sir Cedric (voice)	Animated TV movie
1987	Rob Roy	Voice	Animated TV movie
1987	The Year My Voice Broke	Sergeant Pierce	Feature film
1987	Cry Freedom	Richie	Feature film
1987	Dangerfreaks	Narrator	Documentary film
1988	Olive	Anthony Wheeler	TV movie
1988	Evil Angels	Det. Graeme Charlwood	Feature film
1989	Return from the River Kwai	Lt. Commander Hunt	Feature film
1989	Police State	Tony Fitzgerald	TV movie
1989	Nullarbor Dreaming	Narrator	Documentary film
1991	Steel and Lace	Duncan	Feature film
1991	Hook	Noodler	Feature film
1992	The Public Eye	Henry Haddock Jr.	Feature film
1992	The President's Child	Lipton	TV movie
1993	Silent Cries	Harry Nown	TV movie
1996	Bed of Roses	Bayard	Feature film
1997	5 Men and a Limo	Self	Short film
2002	Seconds to Spare	Commander Haggarty	TV movie
2002	Counterstrike	Admiral Lewis	TV movie
2002	The Junction Boys	Smokey Harper	TV movie
2004	Mementos	Detective (voice)	Short film
2004	Space: 1999	Alan Carter	Short film
2005	The Vanished	Roy	Short film
2006	A Knight Lost	Frank Knight	Short film
2007	The Gene Generation	Doctor	Feature film
2011	Killer Elite	Commander B	Feature film
2012	Qian Xuesen	Kimball	Feature film
2013	The Great Gatsby	Taxi Driver	Feature film
2014	Lupin III (aka Rupan Sansei)	Thomas Dawson	Feature film
2015	The Snow Queen 2: An Icy Adventure (aka Snezhnaya Koroleva 2: Perezamorozka)	Guard (voice)	Animated feature film
2018	Firestorm	NASA Chief (voice)	Animated TV movie
TBA	The Eagle Obsession	Self	Documentary

=== Television ===
Year	Title	Role	Type
1964	The Purple Jacaranda	Bill Armstrong	Miniseries, 6 episodes
1965	My Brother Jack	Davey Meredith	Miniseries, 10 episodes
1966	The Wednesday Play	Private Trevor James	Anthology TV series, season 6, episode 5: A "Pyre for Private James"
1968	Detective	Watt Hatchett	TV series, season 2, episode 15: "Artists in Crime"
1968	Dixon of Dock Green	Don Ross	TV series, season 15, episode 4: "An Ordinary Man"
1968	Sherlock Holmes	James McCarthy	TV series, season 2, episode 6: "The Boscombe Valley Mystery"
1968	The Champions	Landing Party Lookout #2	TV series, season 1, episode 11: "The Dark Island"
1969	The Troubleshooters	Gurd Lingstrom	TV series, season 5, episode 12: "There's This Bird, See..."
1970–1971	Dynasty	Peter Mason	TV series, seasons 1–2, 23 episodes
1971	Matlock Police	Frank Ross	TV series, season 1, episode 4: "Any More at Home Like You"
1972; 1973	Boney	Sgt Peter Irwin	TV series, 2 episodes
1972; 1973	Division 4	Sen. Det. Dave Edwards / Roy Adams	TV series, 3 episodes
1972; 1973	Homicide	Joseph Taylor / John Mason / Barry West	TV series, 3 episodes
1972; 1973	Spyforce	Matt Parsons	TV series, 4 episodes
1973	Over There		TV series, season 2, episode 2: "Overload"
1973	Crown Court	Dr Stephen Saul	TV series, season 2, 3 episodes
1974	Ryan	Moore	TV series, season 1, episode 31: "A Deep Dark Place"
1974	Behind the Legend	Captain Sanderson	Anthology TV series, season 2, episode 1: "Francis Greenaway"
1975	NBC Special Treat	Captain Harry Masters	Anthology TV series, season 1, episode 3: "Into Infinity"
1975–1977	Space: 1999	Alan Carter	TV series, seasons 1–2, 42 episodes
1979	Chopper Squad	Jeff Burns	TV series, season 2, episode 8: "The Other Man's Grass"
1979	Danger UXB	Lt. Chris Craik	TV series, season 1, episode 9: "Seventeen Seconds to Glory"
1979	A Place in the World	Kenneth Reissel	Miniseries, 2 episodes
1980	Play for Today	Steve Jackson	Anthology TV series, season 11, episode 6: "Number on End"
1981	West End Tales	Sport	TV series, season 1, episode 6: "The Wagga Wagga Handicap"
1981	Spearhead	Tim Hoffman	TV series, season 3, 4 episodes
1981	The Gentle Touch	Johnny Delvaux	TV series, season 3, episode 3: "The Hit"
1981–1982	Holiday Island	Neil Scott	TV series, 64 episodes
1982	A Country Practice	Graham Porter	TV series, season 2, 2 episodes
1982	Deadly Harvest	Narrator	TV special
1983	Patrol Boat	Major Winn	TV series, season 2, 2 episodes
1983	Scales of Justice	Attorney General	Miniseries, episode 3: "The Numbers"
1984	Special Squad	Len Harris	TV series, episode 27: "In the Cause of Justice"
1984	The Gold and the Glory	Joe Lucas	
1985	Butterfly Island	Visitor	TV series, 2 episodes
1985–1986	Sons and Daughters	James Hamilton	TV series, 30 episodes
1987	The Flying Doctors	Nigel Haughton	TV series, season 2, episode 4: "It Isn't Cricket"
1988	True Believers	Lee Hayden	Miniseries, 8 episodes
1988	Boon	Ross Townsend	TV series, season 3, episode 4: "Have a Nice Day"
1989	Dolphin Cove	Baron Trent	TV series, 8 episodes
1989–1990	Open House	Roger McSwain	TV series, 24 episodes
1990	Star Trek: The Next Generation	Dirgo	TV series, season 4, episode 9: "Final Mission"
1991	Night Court	John Taylor	TV series, 1 episode, season 9, episode 9: "The System Works"
1992	Matlock	Bob	TV series, season 6, episode 15: "The Big Payoff"
1992	Dear John	Brian Courtney	TV series, season 4, episode 13: "The Big Payday"
1992	Lady Boss		Miniseries
1992; 1996	Murder, She Wrote	Tim Jervis / Inspector Stilwell	TV series, 2 episodes
1993	Civil Wars	Jason Gould	TV series, season 2, episode 16: "Alien Aided Affection"
1994	Red Planet	Colony Leader (voice)	Miniseries, 3 episodes
1996	Party of Five	Professor	TV series, season 3, episode 6: "Going Home"
1996	F/X: The Series	Dingo Tyler	TV series, season 1, episode 6: "Dingo"
1996	The Real Adventures of Jonny Quest	Darcy / Hunter #2 / Pirate #2 / Pirate #3 (voices)	Animated TV series, 2 episodes
1997	Cow & Chicken	English Guy 52 / Egg Buyer (voices)	Animated TV series
1998	Star Trek: Deep Space Nine	Liam Bilby	TV series, season 6, episode 15: "Honor Among Thieves"
1998	Dr. Quinn, Medicine Woman	Martin 'Avishominis' Chesterfield	TV series, season 6, episode 18: "Birdman"
1998	JAG	Jimmy Blackhorse	TV series, season 3, episode 21: "The Return of Jimmy Blackhorse"
1999	The X-Files	Dr. Eugene Openshaw	TV series, season 6, episode 11: "Two Fathers"
2000	Diagnosis Murder	Captain Kennedy	TV series, season 7, episode 12: "Man Overboard"
2000	HBO First Look	Narrator	TV series, season 7, episode 22: "Surviving Vertical Limit"
2000	JAG	Judge	TV series, season 5, episode 16: "Boomerang, Part II"
2001	Water Rats	Senior Sergeant Ray Bock	TV series, season 6, episode 2: "It Happened One Night"
2001	The Lost World	Dr. William Gull	TV series, season 3, episode 5: "The Knife"
2002	All Saints	Jock Laughlin	TV series, season 5, episode 27: "In the Family Way"
2003	Farscape	R. Wilson Munroe	TV series, season 4, episode 17: "A Constellation of Doubt"
2004	Lost	Ray Mullen	TV series, season 1, episode 3: "Tabula Rasa"
2009	East of Everything	Gerry Watkins	TV series, season 2, 7 episodes
2010	The Pacific	Tom Smee	Miniseries, episode 10: "Home"
2011	City Homicide	Ted Mangus	TV series, season 4, episode 23: "The Business of Fear"
2011	SLiDE	Eugene	TV series, episode 6
2013	Pretty Little Liars	Louis Palmer	TV series, season 4, 2 episodes
2016	Rake	Julian Tallow	TV series, season 4, 2 episodes
2017	The Blacklist	Arthur Kilgannon	TV series, season 5, episode 7: "The Kilgannon Corporation (No. 48)"
2019–2024	The Strange Chores	Helsing (voice)	Animated TV series, seasons 1–3, 78 episodes

=== Video games ===
Year	Title	Role	Type
1996	Star Wars: Shadows of the Empire	Prince Xizor / IG-88 (voices)	PC version
1999	Crusaders of Might and Magic	Narrator	
2000	Escape from Monkey Island	Ozzie Mandrill (voice)	
2006	Flushed Away	Fat Barry (voice)	
2015	Mad Max	The Mystic (voice)	
2021	Psychonauts 2	Compton Boole / Dr. Potts (voices)	

== Stage ==
Year	Title	Role	Type
1956	Amahl and the Night Visitors	Amahl	Sydney Opera Company
1963	Sweet Bird of Youth		Independent Theatre, Sydney
1969–1970	The Canterbury Tales	Squire Nicholas the Gallant	Theatre Royal Sydney, Comedy Theatre, Melbourne, His Majesty's Theatre, Perth with J. C. Williamson
1971	The Audition		Theatre Royal, Hobart with AET Trust
1971	The Real Inspector Hound		Theatre Royal, Hobart with AET Trust
1972	An Awful Rose	Brother Meehan	Jane Street Theatre, Sydney with NIDA
1972	Don's Party	Don	Old Tote Theatre, Sydney, Playhouse, Canberra with NIDA
1976	Number One Rooster	Sir Ernest	Royal Court Theatre, London
1977	Duty Free (later known as Don't Bother to Dress)	Victor	Bristol Hippodrome, Palace Theatre, Manchester, Adeline Genée Theatre, East Grinstead, Alhambra Theatre, Bradford, Victoria Palace Theatre, London with TRIP Productions
1979	Winter Journey	Bernie	Cambridge Theatre, London
1983–1984	Caravan	Parks	Sydney Opera House with Ensemble Theatre
1984	Filumena	Domenico Soriano	Melbourne Athenaeum with MTC
1986	The Foreigner	Charlie	Regal Theatre, Perth, University of Sydney, Opera Theatre, Adelaide, Noarlunga College Theatre, Adelaide with The Gordon Frost Organisation & AET Trust
1992	Woman in Mind	Gerald	Tiffany Theater, LA
1998	Seven Out	Harry	Globe Theatre, LA
2006	Titanic: The Musical	Captain Edward J. Smith	Theatre Royal Sydney with Seabiscuit Productions (Australian premiere)
2012	When Dad Married Fury	Alan Urquhart	Ensemble Theatre, Sydney
2015	Corktown '57	Mike	Odyssey Theatre, LA
