= KSAV =

KSAV may refer to:

- Savannah/Hilton Head International Airport ICAO code
- an internet radio airing Rogues and Vagabonds - A Theatrical Scrapbook, a Barry Morse and Anthony Wynn's radio performance

and also :

- Ksav Sofer, the main work of Samuel Benjamin Sofer (1815 - 1871), a leading rabbi of Hungarian Jewry in the second half of the nineteenth century
