= Quinn Martin =

American television producer (1922–1987)

- Born: Irwin Martin Cohn; May 22, 1922; New York City, US
- Died: September 5, 1987 (aged 65); Rancho Santa Fe, California, US
- Occupation: Television producer
- Spouse(s): Madelyn Pugh (a.k.a. Madelyn Davis); Marianne Muffet Webb
- Children: 3
- Parent: Martin G. Cohn

Quinn Martin (born Irwin Martin Cohn; May 22, 1922 – September 5, 1987) was an American television producer. He had at least one television series running in prime time every year for 21 straight years (from 1959 to 1980). Martin is a member of the Television Hall of Fame, having been inducted posthumously in 1997.

== Early life ==
Born on May 22, 1922, in New York City, Martin was the second of two children. His father, Martin Goodman Cohn, was a film editor and producer at the studios of Metro Goldwyn Mayer; his mother was Anna Messing Cohn. He was of Jewish descent. From the age of 4, he was raised in Los Angeles, California. He graduated from Fairfax High School, then served five years in the United States Army during World War II, enlisting in the Signal Corps at Fort MacArthur in San Pedro, California on September 10, 1940, and achieving the rank of sergeant. He later changed his name to Quinn Martin.

While attending the University of California at Berkeley, Martin majored in English studies but did not graduate. Martin started his career in television as a film editor at MGM, joining his father and also worked as manager of post-production for various organizations, including Universal Studios (1950–1954).

His first wife, Madelyn Pugh Davis, was one half of the writing team behind I Love Lucy. By the mid 1950s he had become an executive producer for Desilu Studios, founded by Lucille Ball and Desi Arnaz. In 1959, he produced "The Untouchables", a two-part special that appeared in season 1 of the Westinghouse Desilu Playhouse. The Untouchables later became a weekly television show on the ABC television network, which would win two Emmy Awards in 1960.

== QM Productions ==
In 1960, Martin established his own production company, QM Productions. It produced a string of successful television series during the 1960s and 1970s. The company had kicked off when he signed a deal with ABC to produce television programs, with The New Breed being one of the first QM programs. He then scored big when The Fugitive premiered in 1963, becoming QM's first hit. He filed a lawsuit against ABC in 1968 which was settled two years later in a non-exclusive agreement. In 1976, QM was one of the four television producers who tried launching a syndicated division.

=== Quinn Martin television series ===
Series produced by Quinn Martin
Title	First Episode	Final Episode	Genre	Seasons	Episodes	Original Network
The New Breed	October 3, 1961	June 5, 1962	Crime drama	1	36	ABC
The Fugitive	September 17, 1963	August 29, 1967	Crime drama	4	120	ABC
Twelve O'Clock High	September 18, 1964	January 13, 1967	Military drama	3	78	ABC
The F.B.I.	September 19, 1965	April 28, 1974	Crime drama	9	241	ABC
The Invaders	January 10, 1967	March 26, 1968	Science fiction	2	43	ABC
Dan August	September 23, 1970	April 8, 1971	Crime drama	1	26	ABC
Cannon	September 14, 1971	March 3, 1976	Crime drama	5	122	CBS
Banyon	September 15, 1972	January 12, 1973	Crime drama	1	15	NBC
The Streets of San Francisco	September 16, 1972	June 9, 1977	Crime drama	5	121	ABC
Barnaby Jones	January 23, 1973	April 3, 1980	Crime drama	8	178	CBS
The Manhunter	September 11, 1974	March 5, 1975	Crime drama	1	22	CBS
Caribe	February 17, 1975	May 12, 1975	Crime drama	1	13	ABC
Bert D'Angelo/Superstar	February 21, 1976	July 10, 1976	Crime drama	1	12	ABC
Most Wanted	October 16, 1976	August 20, 1977	Crime drama	1	21	ABC
Quinn Martin's Tales of the Unexpected	February 2, 1977	August 24, 1977	Horror/Sci Fi	1	8	NBC
The Runaways	April 27, 1978	September 4, 1979	Drama	2	18	NBC
A Man Called Sloane	September 22, 1979	December 22, 1979	Secret Agent	1	12	NBC

Besides producing sixteen one-hour television network series, he also produced twenty "made-for-TV" movies, including House on Greenapple Road (1970), Incident in San Francisco (1971), Murder or Mercy (1974), The FBI Story: The FBI vs. Alvin Karpis, Public Enemy Number One (1974), Attack on Terror: The FBI vs. the Ku Klux Klan (1975), and Brink's: The Great Robbery (1976). Some TV movies, like Code Name: Diamond Head (1977), and The Hunted Lady (1977), were originally filmed as pilots for new television dramas which were never picked up by the networks. His only feature film was The Mephisto Waltz (1971), released by 20th Century Studios.

In 1978, a duo of investors purchased his wholly self-owned QM Productions; they subsequently sold it to Taft Broadcasting in 1979. In 1980, the company launched a pay television division hiring HBO executive Harlem Kleiman as executive. In 1984, QM Productions became Taft Entertainment Television, with the sitcom The Lucie Arnaz Show being the first program to carry the new name.

=== Typical format of a Quinn Martin Production program ===
Shows produced by the company were usually introduced by announcer Dick Wesson or Hank Simms reading the title of the series and saying, "A Quinn Martin Production." Images of the stars of the show, followed by the guest stars for that week, were shown and their names announced, followed by "Tonight's episode", and the name of the episode, with various to-black effects. In some series, such as The Fugitive and The Invaders, its backstory that led to the plot of the series, narrated by the announcer or the star, was told before the show's guest stars were announced. While episodes were structured into the usual four "acts" and an "epilogue," each was explicitly labelled at the start of each segment with the show title and the act number (or "epilogue" near the end of the program).

== Later life ==
Martin worked as an adjunct professor at the University of California at San Diego's Earl Warren College, where he also endowed a professorial chair in drama. He also established a scholarship for theater arts and communications students at Santa Clara University Martin moved to Rancho Santa Fe, California, near San Diego where he became president of the La Jolla Playhouse and the Del Mar Fair board of directors. He was involved with developing motion pictures for Warner Bros. with a new company named QM Communications.

== Death ==
Martin died of a heart attack on September 5, 1987 in his home in Rancho Santa Fe, California.
