= Hayward Morse =

British stage and voice actor

- Born: Hayward Barry Morse; London, England
- Occupation: Actor
- Parent(s): Barry Morse; Sydney Sturgess
- Website: http://www.anthonywynn.com/haywardmorse

Hayward Barry Morse is a British stage and voice actor. His career began on CBC television and with numerous stage performances in Canada and the United States. He made his US television debut in 1959 with Ingrid Bergman in the film The Turn of the Screw.

== Background ==
Morse is the son of actors Barry Morse and Sydney Sturgess and brother of Melanie Morse MacQuarrie. He received a scholarship at the age of 16 to the Royal Academy of Dramatic Art (RADA) in London, receiving the 'Silver Medal' award upon graduation.

== Career ==
He made his London West End debut in the original production of Joe Orton's What The Butler Saw at the Queen's Theatre in 1969 with Ralph Richardson, Stanley Baxter and Coral Browne.

He received a Best Supporting Actor Antoinette Perry 'Tony' award nomination for his performance in Simon Gray's Butley on Broadway, starred in the first stage production of The Rocky Horror Show, the Bristol Old Vic production of Oscar Wilde's Lady Windermere's Fan, and has appeared in many of William Shakespeare's plays internationally. Other stage roles include 'Hercule Poirot' in Alibi, the dual roles of 'Aunt' and 'Nephew' in Travels with My Aunt, Sleuth and I Ought to be in Pictures. Morse appeared as 'Bosie' in the North American premiere of Bernard and Bosie: A Most Unlikely Friendship by Anthony Wynn alongside his father, Barry Morse.

A voice artist, Hayward Morse has recorded hundreds of audio books, including the works of Edgar Allan Poe, Harold Robbins, Bernard Cornwell, Jackie Collins, Arthur C. Clarke, and Mickey Spillane.
