= Merely Players =

Merely Players may refer to:

- Merely Players (play), a one-man stage show written and performed by Barry Morse
- Merely Players (film), a lost 1918 silent film drama
- "...merely Players", part of the Shakespeare monologue All the world's a stage
