= Dick Wesson =

Dick Wesson may refer to:

- Dick Wesson (announcer) (1919–1979), American film and television announcer
- Dick Wesson (actor) (1922–1996), American character actor, comedian, comedy writer and producer
