= Elizabeth Sharland =

Australian actress (1933–2025)

Elizabeth Sharland (24 February 1933 – 16 May 2025) was an Australian actress, author and producer. Her first book, From Shakespeare to Coward, was published in 1997 and she wrote six more books on the theatre, including The British on Broadway, A Theatrical Feast of London, and A Theatrical Feast of New York, as well as penning a novel, The Best Actress, promoted by the noted British public relations consultant Richard Fitzwilliams. She spoke regularly at book signings at venues such as the Players Club and National Arts Club in New York. Her last book was Passionate Pilgrimages from Chopin to Coward.

== Early life ==
Sharland was born in Hobart, Tasmania on 24 February 1933. Her father, Michael Sharland, was a journalist, photographer, author and amateur ornithologist.

She studied at St Michael's Collegiate School, also taking private lessons in speech, drama and music. Sharland won a scholarship to study at the Guildhall School in London, and left to take up studies there for two years, gaining a diploma in piano as well as in drama.

Her acting career began with her first professional job at the Felixstowe Repertory Company, after which she toured Australia for six months with London's Old Vic Company, alongside Katharine Hepburn and Robert Helpmann. She later lived in Tangier, where she taught music at the American School and performed as house pianist at the Velasquez Hotel.

After her marriage, she moved to Toronto, Ontario, Canada with her doctor husband who had accepted a position there. She joined the summer stock company The Straw Hat Players to tour Ontario.

She performed many roles for CBC Radio and CBC-TV dramas, including the General Motors Hour, with actors Gordon Pinsent, Barry Morse, Robert Goulet and Douglas Campbell.

== Theatrical work: Paris, New York, London, and beyond ==
Sharland later went to live in Paris, France, where she opened her own English-speaking cafe-theatre, featuring new plays, and she details the experience in her 2008 book A Theatrical Feast in Paris which profiles many of the city's famous theatres and restaurants, including Le Grand Véfour.

In 1983, she re-located to New York City, and served as personal assistant to actor Yul Brynner on his final tour of the US in The King and I. She started writing plays, three of which were produced at American Theatre of Actors in New York. After Brynner's death, Sharland moved back to London, producing an anthology entitled Love From Shakespeare to Coward at the Theatre Museum, and she cast over 200 actors to work in it over six years.

== Later life and death ==
Sharland's 2009 book, Passionate Pilgrimages, recounts her years of travelling through Europe and Africa, describing her journey to meet the American composer and writer Paul Bowles, and also offers memories of her family in Tasmania as well as the composers, writers and musicians she went to visit during her career. The book was launched at Hatchard's in London in May 2009, and also on board the RMS Queen Mary 2 in July 2009. Her final book, Behind the Doors of Notorious Covent Garden is featured as part of New York Lincoln Center's New Books in the Performing Arts series, where Sharland is joined by actress Tammy Grimes and cabaret artist Steve Ross at a March 10, 2011 event at the Dorothy and Lewis B. Cullman Center.

Sharland died in West Palm Beach, Florida on 16 May 2025, at the age of 92.
