= Robert E. Wood (painter) =

Canadian fine artist and author (born 1971)

Robert E. Wood (born 22 May 1971) is a Canadian fine artist and author. He specializes in representational landscape paintings, which focus on the Rocky Mountains, lakes, rivers and forests of Alberta and British Columbia. Wood's diverse subject matter also includes street scenes, still life and floral subjects, among others. He has been painting full-time since 1989. Wood's career follows over 70 years of professional art in his family.

Wood is co-author, with Barry Morse and Anthony Wynn, of the books Pulling Faces, Making Noises: A Life on Stage, Screen and Radio and Merely Players - The Scripts. His next work, Stories of the Theatre (1996), co-written with Anthony Wynn, combines the drama, tragedy and comedy of theatrical history with tales of actors, actresses, playwrights and critics. Wood is also co-author of Remember With Advantages: Chasing 'The Fugitive' and Other Stories from an Actor's Life (2007), the theatrical memoir of Barry Morse.

In 2010, Destination: Moonbase Alpha - The Unofficial and Unauthorised Guide to SPACE: 1999, was published in the UK by Telos Publishing. This book documents the classic cult science fiction series Space: 1999. Also featured are a colour photo section featuring the model spacecraft built for the series by Martin Bower, as well as a Foreword by Zienia Merton and an Afterword by Barry Morse.
