= Sydney Sturgess =

British-Canadian actress

- Born: Dorothy Anna Sturgess; March 5, 1915; Ipoh, Malaya
- Died: September 30, 1999 (aged 84); Toronto, Ontario, Canada
- Resting place: Saint James Park, London, England
- Occupation: Actress
- Years active: 1944-1980
- Spouse: Barry Morse (m. 1939)
- Children: Hayward Morse; Melanie Morse MacQuarrie
- Website: http://www.anthonywynn.com/sydneysturgess/

Dorothy Anna Sturgess (March 5, 1915 – September 30, 1999), known professionally as Sydney Sturgess, was a British-Canadian actress. She is best known for her work with the Shaw Festival and the Stratford Festival of Canada. Primarily a stage actress in Canada, England and the US, she occasionally worked in television and film.

== Background ==
Born in Ipoh, Malaya, Sturgess was the eldest of four children; two brothers and a sister. She carried a distinguished Canadian ancestry – her great-grandfather was Edward Palmer, Q.C., of Prince Edward Island, who was also one of the Fathers of Confederation. Her father was a civil engineer and was assigned to remote countries around the world to build bridges, so the family traveled frequently.

Her teenage years were spent for the most part at St. Stephen's boarding school in Folkestone, Kent, England. She received her dramatic training in England, as well, at the London College of Music where she received an A.L.C.M. in elocution. After graduation, she joined the Arthur Brough Players in Folkestone, first as a student and then later as an actress.

Sturgess acted in various English repertory companies before meeting Barry Morse in Peterborough on January 3, 1939. Morse and Sturgess married on March 26, 1939. As a result of her work in repertory, both prior to and following her marriage, she gained broad experience as an actress through her work in literally hundreds of stage productions throughout the 1930s and 1940s. Their two children, Hayward Morse and Melanie Morse MacQuarrie, were born in 1947 and 1945, respectively. The family emigrated to Canada in 1951, where Sydney enjoyed several successful seasons of theatre at the Montreal Mountain Playhouse, as well as radio work and teaching, until moving to Toronto with the advent of television in 1953.

Sturgess' stage credits span more than fifty years and include London West End productions with such personalities as Dame Marie Tempest and A.E. Matthews in The First Mrs. Fraser, and later in her career on Broadway opposite Morse and Alec McCowen in Hadrian VII.

Her performances ranged from acting in Jupiter Theatre's production of Relative Values, The Potting Shed at the Crest Theatre, and with the Canadian Players in Romeo and Juliet and Pygmalion. She also played in George Bernard Shaw's Man and Superman, as "Mrs. Darling" in Peter Pan and played in more productions of Charley's Aunt than perhaps any other actress.

In 1958 she wrote and produced her own radio series for the CBC (Canadian Broadcasting Corporation) called Poet's Corner. She also appeared on television as Catherine de Medici in Patrick Watson's series, Witness to Yesterday, and in the title role of George Bernard Shaw's Catherine the Great. She starred as the Countess of Brocklehurst in the Shaw Festival's production of The Admirable Crighton, appeared in A Day in the Death of Joe Egg at the Manitoba Theatre Centre, and played "Mrs. Higgins" in another run of Shaw's Pygmalion at the Nottingham Playhouse in England.

Sturgess was diagnosed with Parkinson's disease in 1985 and lived with her illness for over fourteen years, before dying in her sleep aged 84.
