= The Zoo Gang =

British television series

- Genre: Drama
- Based on: The Zoo Gang by Paul Gallico
- Starring: John Mills; Brian Keith; Lilli Palmer; Barry Morse
- Theme music composer: Paul and Linda McCartney
- Composer: Ken Thorne
- Country of origin: United Kingdom
- Original language: English
- No. of series: 1
- No. of episodes: 6

Production
- Producer: Herbert Hirshman
- Cinematography: Robert Paynter
- Running time: 49–51 minutes
- Production company: ATV

Original release
- Network: ITV
- Release: 5 April – 10 May 1974

The Zoo Gang is a 1974 ITC Entertainment drama series that ran for six one-hour colour episodes, based on the 1971 book of the same title by Paul Gallico.

== Plot ==
Five French Resistance fighters, known by their animal-based code names (the Wolf, the Tiger, the Elephant, the Leopard and the Fox), fought during World War II. Their efforts came to a stop when one of their number, Claude Roget (the Wolf), was betrayed to the Gestapo by a contact called Boucher. During their interrogation of him, Roget—who was the husband of Manouche (the Leopard)--was shot dead before her eyes.

Twenty-eight years later, Thomas Devon (the Elephant) spots Boucher (going under the name of Rosch) in his shop. The surviving members of the Zoo Gang drop what they are doing and rendezvous for vengeance. The rest of the series follows the adventures of the remaining gang of four resistance fighters reunited decades later to scam habitual con artists and criminals in order to take their money and use it for good causes. Despite their ages, they put their skills and experience to use to raise enough money to construct a hospital in memory of Claude. The gang is (reluctantly) aided by the son of Manouche and Claude, an inspector in the French police.

The series is set in Nice on the French Riviera. Guest stars include Philip Madoc, Peter Cushing and Jacqueline Pearce. Roger Delgado also appeared, although he had died in a car crash before the series was broadcast.

== Main cast ==
- Barry Morse as Alec Marlowe – The Tiger: Canadian, now working as a vehicle mechanic.
- Lilli Palmer as Manouche Roget – The Leopard: French, running a small cafe "Les Pecheurs" in Nice.
- Brian Keith as Steven Halliday – The Fox: American, now an antiques dealer.
- John Mills as Thomas Devon – The Elephant: British, running a jewellery shop in Nice; given his nickname because of his excellent memory.
- Michael Petrovitch as Lieutenant Georges Roget (Roget's son)
- Serretta Wilson as Jill Burton (Devon's niece)

== Music ==
The theme music was composed by Paul and Linda McCartney. The score was composed by Ken Thorne. Both are available on the Network compilation The Music of ITC, Network 7959016.

== Episode list ==
Airdates given here are for ATV; other ITV regions airdates varied.

| No. | Title | Directed by | Written by | Original release date |
|---|---|---|---|---|
| 1 | "Revenge: Post-Dated" | Sidney Hayers | Reginald Rose | 5 April 1974 |
Thomas sees a former war criminal (Walter Gotell) in the town and tells Manouche. Together they decide to contact their former comrades, who come to France and help deliver the criminal to the police. After they complete the mission Alec and Steven decide to stay on a while with their old friends.
| 2 | "Mindless Murder" | Johnny Hough | Howard Dimsdale | 12 April 1974 |
The gang uncovers extortion racketeers who are targeting two married movie stars (Ingrid Pitt and Clinton Greyn). The extortionists want the Morning Star, a rare diamond in the care of the Martins. The gang decides to take out the crooks, but first they have to get their hands on the well-secured diamond themselves.
| 3 | "African Misfire" | Sidney Hayers | Peter Yeldham | 19 April 1974 |
The art collection of a deposed African president is stolen and the gang sets about recovering it, only to discover they know the thief – a former wartime colleague.
| 4 | "The Lion Hunt" | Sidney Hayers | Sean Graham | 26 April 1974 |
When the revolutionary Pedro Ortega – 'El Leon' (Roger Delgado) – enters France and is accidentally arrested by Manouche's son Georges, the police and the ministry need him released again. Georges gets the gang to get El Leon out of prison but then they find that the minister had arranged a deal with El Leon for a million Francs but was going to double-cross him, so the gang sets about saving the day.
| 5 | "The Counterfeit Trap" | Johnny Hough | John Kruse | 3 May 1974 |
The gang decides to stop a gold-smuggling ring, paying for the gold with counterfeit French Francs. Alec gets arrested when the police think he killed the couriers. Peter Cushing stars as the local investigating magistrate with Jacqueline Pearce as his wife.
| 6 | "The Twisted Cross" | Johnny Hough | William Fairchild | 10 May 1974 |
The gang comes to the aid of a German (Bernard Kay) being attacked in an alley. It turns out that he is the only one who knows the location of a submarine full of sunken treasure. The gang agrees to help him in return for a share of the loot to pay for Claude's memorial hospital. They dive for the treasure and recover the only surviving piece; a jewelled swastika, which is immediately confiscated by French customs officers. But they quickly discover that the customs officers are fakes who killed the real officers, and the gang comes up with a plan to recover the piece and make a little more money.

== International distribution ==
The series aired on CBC-TV in Canada in the summer of 1974. In the U.S., the series was broadcast by NBC, two episodes per night for three nights in July and August 1975.

== Home media ==
The complete series was released on Region 2 DVD on 2 July 2007. Actor Barry Morse (The Tiger), by then the last surviving regular actor from the series, provided an introduction in the DVD extras. He died the following year.

The complete series was released in high-definition on Blu-Ray disc by Network Distributing on 21 May 2018.
