= Melanie Morse MacQuarrie =

British-born Canadian actress

- Born: Melanie Virginia Sydney Morse; 13 June 1945; London, England, United Kingdom
- Died: 1 February 2005 (aged 59); Montague, Prince Edward Island, Canada
- Years active: 1952–1988
- Spouse: Donald MacQuarrie
- Website: http://www.anthonywynn.com/melaniemorse/

Melanie Virginia Sydney Morse MacQuarrie (13 June 1945 – 1 February 2005) was a British-born Canadian actress.

== Background ==
MacQuarrie was the daughter of actors Barry Morse and Sydney Sturgess and sister of Hayward Morse. She was born in London, England, but lived in Canada from the age of six. She earned the nickname "Big Mel," having made several newspaper headlines in London as one of the largest babies born in Britain, at 11 pounds, 9 ounces.

== Career ==
She worked professionally as a child actress and later as an adult, when she was sometimes billed by her married name Melanie Morse MacQuarrie. She received a scholarship at the age of 19 to the Royal Academy of Dramatic Art (RADA) in London.

Her film work includes roles in Prom Night (1980) with Jamie Lee Curtis and Leslie Nielsen, as well as Murder by Phone (1982) with Richard Chamberlain. On stage, she performed in such diverse venues as stages in Boston, Massachusetts and the Stratford Festival of Canada, in productions including Peter Pan and Much Ado About Nothing. Her TV appearances include Noises in the Nursery, Drought, and the popular Canadian television series Street Legal.

== Death ==
She died in Montague, Prince Edward Island, from a heart attack. She was 59 years old. She was survived by her husband, Donald, and two daughters, Vanessa Root Archer and Megan MacQuarrie, as well as her father and younger brother.

== Filmography ==
Year	Title	Role	Notes
1980	Prom Night	Henri-Anne	
1982	Murder by Phone	Woman Speaker	
