= Late at Night (film) =

- Directed by: Michael C. Chorlton
- Screenplay by: Henry C. James
- Produced by: Herbert Wyne
- Cinematography: Jan Sikorski
- Production company: Bruton Films
- Distributed by: Premiere
- Release date: 1946
- Running time: 76 mins (later 69 mins)
- Country: United Kingdom
- Language: English

Late at Night is a 1946 British second feature ('B') film directed by Michael C. Chorlton and starring Daphne Day and Barry Morse. It was written by Henry C. James.

== Premise ==
Newspaper reporter Dave Jackson investigates a gang black marketeering in wood alcohol.

== Cast ==
- Daphne Day as Jill Esdaile, singer
- Barry Morse as Dave Jackson, reporter
- Noel Dryden as Tony Cunningham, nightclub boss
- Paul Demel as The Spider, gang leader
- Frank Atkinson as Sergeant

== Reception ==
The Monthly Film Bulletin wrote: "Barry Morse struggles valiantly with the role of the newspaper reporter and gives a likeable performance, but he is hampered by a poor script, weak direction and by players who, with one or two exceptions, appear to have little idea of film acting. The film has some moments of unintentional humour."

Kine Weekly wrote: "The picture has quite good atmosphere, a fair number of tense and exciting moments and a slap-up finale, and these qualities help its story cheapness and help to conceal histrionic deficiencies. Although admittedly smaller in stature than the average American gangster film, it nevertheless carries a kick. Its quota angle and convenient footage support its claim to second-feature honours."

In British Sound Films: The Studio Years 1928–1959, David Quinlan rated the film as "poor", writing: "Unintentionally funny thriller."
