= Hank Simms =

American actor (1923–2013)

- Born: May 25, 1923; Tulsa, Oklahoma, U.S.
- Died: August 7, 2013 (aged 90); Hot Springs, Arkansas, U.S.
- Occupations: Voice actor, announcer
- Years active: 1957–1982

Hank Simms (May 25, 1923 – August 7, 2013) was an American voice actor and announcer, best known for narrating the opening credits of Quinn Martin TV shows, including The F.B.I., Barnaby Jones, Cannon and The Streets of San Francisco. He was also hired to imitate his distinctive announcing style in the opening credits for the satirical TV series Police Squad!.
