= The Invaders =

American sci-fi television series (1967–1968)

- Genre: Science fiction
- Created by: Larry Cohen
- Narrated by: Dick Wesson (episode credits); Bill Woodson (all other narration)
- Theme music composer: Dominic Frontiere
- Country of origin: United States
- No. of seasons: 2
- No. of episodes: 43

Production
- Executive producer: Quinn Martin
- Producer: Alan A. Armer
- Production location: Queen of Angels Hospital
- Cinematography: Andrew J. McIntyre
- Running time: 51 min.
- Production company: QM Productions

Original release
- Network: ABC
- Release: January 10, 1967 – March 26, 1968

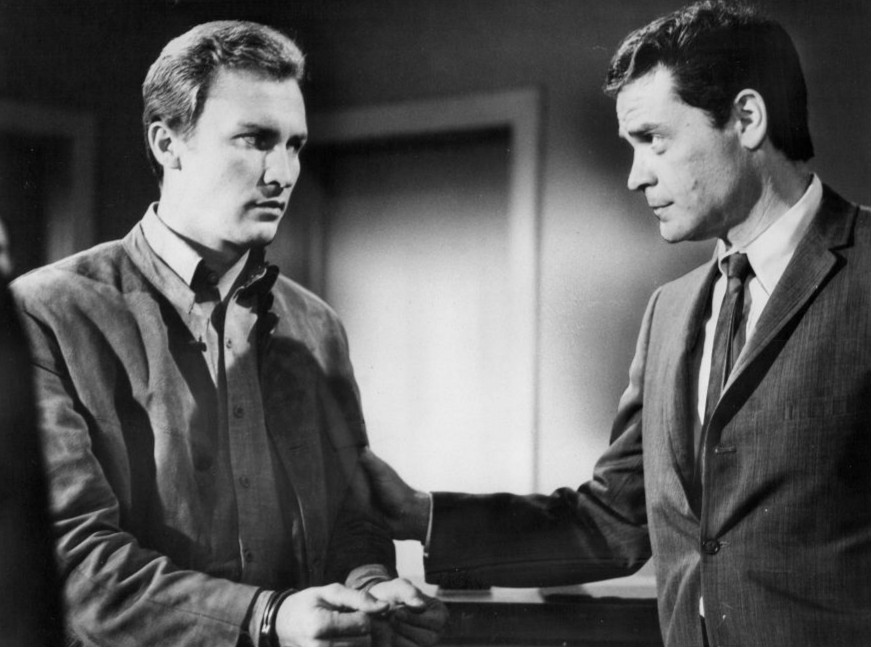
Roy Thinnes and Lee Farr in a network publicity photo for the 1967 episode "Doomsday Minus One".

The Invaders is an American science fiction television series created by Larry Cohen that aired on ABC for two seasons, from 1967 to 1968. Roy Thinnes stars as David Vincent, who after stumbling across evidence of an alien invasion—the aliens disguising themselves as humans and gradually infiltrating human institutions—tries to thwart the invasion despite the disbelief of officials and the general public, and the undermining of his efforts by the aliens. The series was a Quinn Martin production.

== Plot ==
The architect David Vincent accidentally learns of a secret alien invasion and thereafter travels from place to place attempting to foil the aliens' plots and warn a skeptical populace of the danger. Other plot elements include Vincent's grim and lonely determination to find "tangible proof of the invaders' existence" despite having become a "quasi-famous object of public ridicule"; the aliens' success in hiding their plots, undermining Vincent's credibility and killing off those who also discover them in ways disguised as a natural death; and the constant tension over whether the individuals Vincent comes across are humans or aliens. As the series progresses, Vincent is able to convince a small number of people to help him fight the aliens.

In many episodes, at least one individual, often a key figure such as a U.S. Air Force intelligence officer (in the episode "The Innocent"), a police officer (in "Genesis" and "The Spores"), a U.S. Army major ("Doomsday Minus One"), or a NASA official ("Moonshot") becomes aware of the alien threat and survives. In "The Leeches", a millionaire (Arthur Hill) survives an alien abduction after being rescued by Vincent, while in "Quantity: Unknown" a scientist (Susan Strasberg) is convinced of alien technology. In "The Saucer", guest stars Anne Francis and Charles Drake witness an alien saucer's landing. In the second season, larger groups of surviving witnesses were featured, as in episodes "Dark Outpost" and "The Pursued", and three scientists in "Labyrinth". Most significant of these is millionaire industrialist Edgar Scoville (Kent Smith), who became a semi-regular character as of December 1967, heading a small but influential group from the episode "The Believers". Later episodes had the military involved ("The Peacemaker"), as Vincent's claims were now clearly being taken more seriously. In "The Miracle" (guest star Barbara Hershey), after an alien encounter, Vincent manages to retain a piece of alien technology both as evidence and for examination by both his group and the authorities.

The series depicted an undercurrent of at least partial credulity among authority figures regarding Vincent's claims, even in the first season, as in early episodes such as "The Mutation", where a security agent (Lin McCarthy) is keeping an eye on Vincent and ends up inclined to believe him. In "The Innocent", the USAF officer (Dabney Coleman) guns down an alien who incinerates in front of him, tying in with Vincent's claims; while at the end of the episode after apparently disbelieving Vincent, he then phones USAF security to run a full background check on an officer who Vincent claimed was an alien. In "Moonshot", the NASA official (Peter Graves) is fully expecting Vincent to arrive; and in "Condition: Red", a NORAD officer and staff witness an alien UFO formation onscreen, and are left convinced. Each of these incidents is kept to just the individual episode, with hinted official backing of Vincent (or at least 'semi-backing' suggested in the episode "The Condemned"). Elsewhere, Vincent is shown as being publicly 'dismissed as a crank' by the authorities, while behind the scenes they apparently take him seriously—for example in "Doomsday Minus One", where Vincent has been invited by an Army intelligence official and then is given classified information; in the two-part "Summit Meeting" where he is present at a top security meeting without any question; and in "Condition: Red" where he is allowed into NORAD without question. Thus, viewers were left to draw their own conclusions as to the situation regarding Vincent's actual standing.

=== Characteristics of the invaders ===
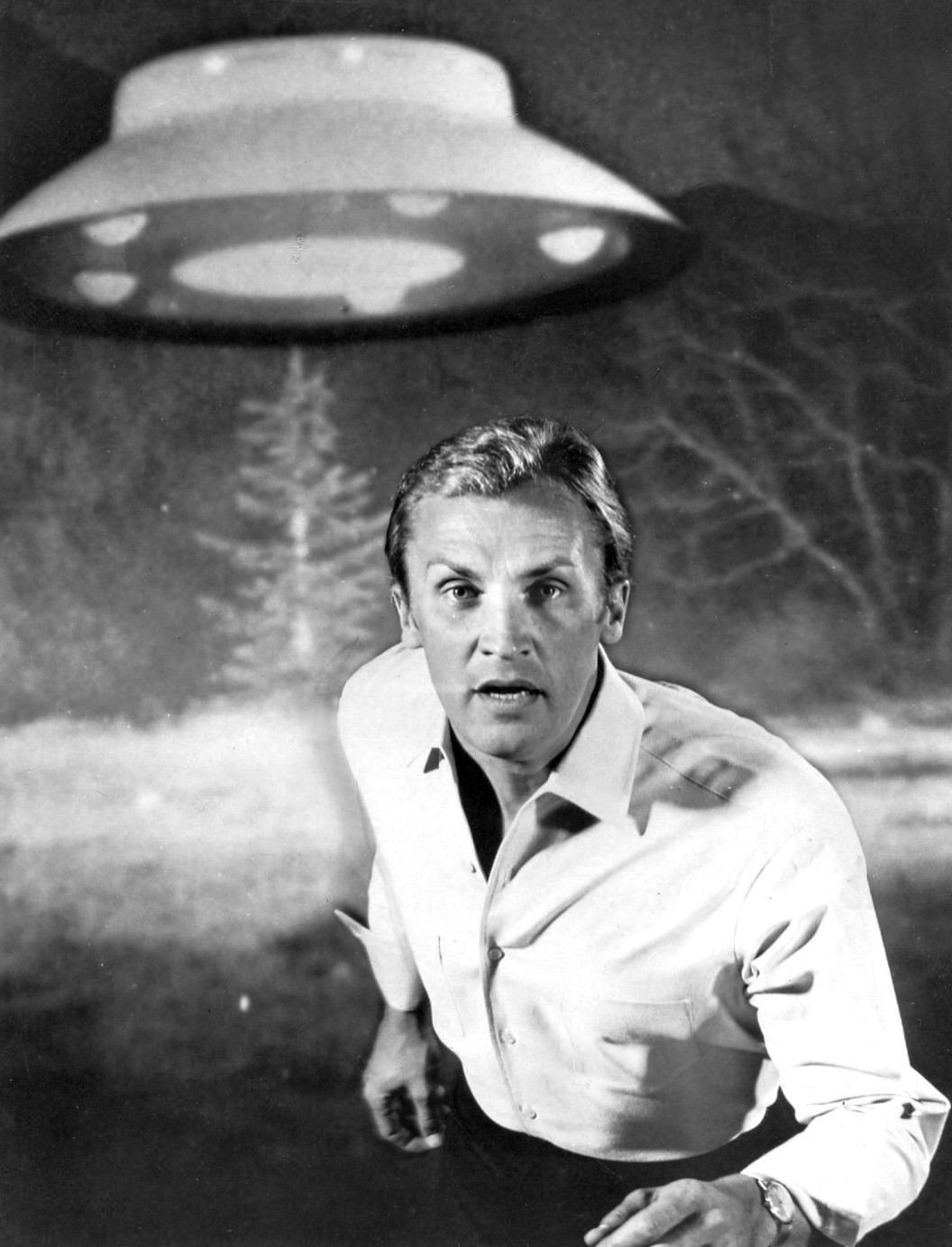
Roy Thinnes in The Invaders, 1966

The emphasis of the series is on Vincent and his efforts, and unlike most science fiction the back story of the aliens—their "dying" planet in "another galaxy" (or even their names)—is "a deliberate blank". They appear human except for a few telltale characteristics (they lack a pulse, the ability to bleed, or show emotion, and many have a deformed fourth finger). While the disguised aliens can be killed by humans, they glow red and disintegrate when this happens, eliminating evidence of their existence. The aliens are shown in their true form in only two episodes. In "Genesis" (season one, episode five), an ill alien researcher loses his human form and is briefly seen immersed in a tank of water. "The Enemy" has a dying, mutated Invader (Richard Anderson) revert to his true appearance. Unless they receive periodic treatments in what Vincent calls "regeneration chambers", which consume a great deal of electrical power, they revert to their alien form. One scene in the series showed an alien beginning to revert, filmed in soft focus and with pulsating red light.

Most of the aliens, in particular the lowest-ranking members or workers in green jumpsuits, are emotionless and have deformed little fingers that cannot move and are bent at an unnatural angle, although "deluxe models" could manipulate this finger. Black aliens' palms were not pale, like humans of African descent, but were the same shade as the rest of their skins. Some mutants experience emotions similar to those of humans and even oppose the alien takeover.

When aliens die, their bodies glow red and burn up along with their clothes and anything else they were touching, preventing the documenting of their existence. On several occasions, a dying alien would deliberately touch a piece of their technology to prevent it from falling into the hands of humans. In episode three ("The Mutation"), a female alien who falls for Vincent and is killed while running to warn him he is in danger tells him, "That's what happens to us when we die here on Earth."

=== Technology of the invaders ===
The type of spaceship by which the Invaders reach the Earth is a flying saucer of a design resembling early 1950s photographs of alleged UFOs produced by self-proclaimed UFO "contactee" George Adamski. They differ slightly from Adamski's images in not having three spheres on the underside, but instead five shallower protrusions. Numerous pieces of alien technology featured "penta" or five-sided designs. It was a principle of the production crew to show The Invaders' technology with set, prop designs, and control panels that were utterly alien from the conventional human ones (such as H. R. Giger would later present in Alien).

To kill humans they apply a small, handheld, disc-shaped weapon with five glowing white lights to the back of the victim's head or neck to induce a seemingly natural death, which is usually diagnosed as a cerebral hemorrhage. They also employ weapons that disintegrate witnesses, vehicles, and when necessary members of their own race with some sort of ray. Also in their arsenal is a small device consisting of two spinning, transparent crystals joined at their corners which acts like a truth serum, forces human beings to do the aliens' bidding, or (in most cases) imposes the complete loss of memory of previous events.

== Themes ==
According to producer Alan A. Armer, "The major thing that the show had going for it is the fact that we are all a little bit paranoid, and that it's easy to identify with ... one person fighting the society, fighting the government, fighting an invisible force ..." Series creator Larry Cohen noted the similarities between The Invaders and another Quinn Martin-produced show, The Fugitive, while also describing Alfred Hitchcock as a major influence.

Of course The Invaders was definitely in the same genre as The Fugitive: a man moving across America, in search of something, and in jeopardy. Really, to me, my idea was taken more from Alfred Hitchcock than it was taken from The Fugitive. I always liked the Hitchcock movie where the hero is in a situation where he's the only one that knows the spies are operating, and no one will believe him. And when he takes the police back to the locale where he saw their operation, everything has been removed, there's no more evidence, everybody lies and says that he was never there before.

Such Hitchcock movies include The 39 Steps (1935) with Robert Donat, Saboteur (1942) with Robert Cummings, and North by Northwest (1959) with Cary Grant.

The large numbers of UFO reports in the post-World War II era was the subject of paranoia and conspiracy, as scientists and authorities (the Condon Committee and the Robertson Panel), and debunkers dismissed or downplayed the reports; (Note: In 1953, the Robertson Panel, concluded the real danger of UFOs "was the reports themselves" which might well "clog military intelligence channels, precipitate panic, and lead defense personnel to ignore real indications of hostile action". To deal with the threat the panel called for "a 'broad educational program integrating efforts of all concerned agencies' ... They sought to strip U.F.O.'s of their 'aura of mystery' through this program of 'training and "debunking."' The program would result in the 'proper recognition of unusually illuminated objects' and in a 'reduction in public interest in "flying saucers."' The panelists recommended that their mass‐media program have as its advisers psychologists familiar with mass psychology and advertising experts, while Walt Disney animated cartoons and such personalities as Arthur Godfrey would help in the educational drive.") and dedicated "ufologists" made sometimes-outlandish claims of alien presence on Earth and of earthly conspiracies to suppress evidence of it. (Note: Clifford Stone, a speaker at a May 9, 2001 National Press Club presentation on the "Disclosure Project", maintained that he had catalogued fifty-seven species of aliens on earth, many of them humanoid. "You have individuals that look very much like you and myself, that could walk among us and you wouldn't even notice the difference." A conspiracy theory promoted by some UFOlogists claims that "a clandestine, para-governmental organization" named Majestic 12, was "convened under executive order by President [Harry] Truman. President [John F.] Kennedy was assassinated because he planned to level with Premier Khrushchev; Kennedy had confided in Marilyn Monroe, thereby sealing her fate.") Interest in the subject of UFOs became fringe, and "a punchline" in popular culture.

== Cast ==
- Roy Thinnes appears as David Vincent in all 43 episodes. For the first 30 episodes, he is the only recurring character.
- Kent Smith appears as Edgar Scoville for 13 episodes, beginning with episode 31, "The Believers". Scoville heads a small group called The Believers, who accept David Vincent's claims of alien invasion. None of the other Believers are series regulars, and are typically only seen briefly on-screen as extras or in bit roles.
- Lin McCarthy appears as Col. Archie Harmon, a skeptical friend of Scoville's, in two episodes.
- Alfred Ryder appears as an Invaders leader in three episodes.
- Max Kleven appears as an unnamed Alien in five episodes.

== Production ==
=== Development ===
The series was produced by Quinn Martin, who was looking for a show to replace the immensely popular The Fugitive, which was ending its run in 1967. Larry Cohen, the series' creator, had conceived two earlier series with similarities to The Invaders. Chuck Connors starred in Branded (1965) as a soldier court-martialed for cowardice, who traveled the West searching for witnesses and proof that he had acted valiantly, and Coronet Blue (1967) about Michael Alden, a man suffering from amnesia who was being pursued by a powerful group of people. All he could remember were the words "Coronet Blue".

Another inspiration was the wave of "alien Doppelgänger" films which had come 10 years before in the 1950s, typified by Invasion of the Body Snatchers (1956) and the British film Quatermass 2 (1957), known in America as Enemy from Space. While these paranoid tales of extraterrestrials who lived among us, posing as humans while planning a takeover, are usually linked with a Red Scare subtext, Martin simply wanted a premise that would keep the hero moving around and that would explain why he could not go to the authorities (i.e. not only had some aliens infiltrated human institutions already, but most humans would dismiss a claim of alien invasion as a paranoid delusion). As the series unfolded, the 'disappearances' of people in episodes (killed by the Invaders, such as Vincent's partner Alan Landers—played by James Daly—in the pilot, etc.), those installed alien figures revealed to be aliens by Vincent thus having to withdraw (such as Edward Andrews' character in "The Mutation", etc.) plus the surviving one or two key human witnesses in most episodes (from the third episode onwards) did rather alter the basic premise of the show to something deeper and more thought-provoking early on.

Season one was produced in association with the ABC Television Network or as it was listed in the end credits, "The American Broadcasting Company Television Network".

=== Production Sequence ===
Before each episode, an "in color" promo bumper, typical of most ABC programs of the era, appears, as ABC was the last network to adopt color programming: Next... The Invaders, In Color!

Then, following the bumper, each episode begins with a cold open, to help set up the plot of the episode to come. After the prologue, the main title appears, announced by Dick Wesson:

The Invaders! A Quinn Martin Production. Starring Roy Thinnes as architect David Vincent.

(A different shot of Thinnes' face was used for the second season.) This would be followed by the opening narration (by Bill Woodson):

The Invaders, alien beings from a dying planet. Their destination: the Earth. Their purpose: to make it their world. David Vincent has seen them. For him, it began one lost night on a lonely country road, looking for a shortcut that he never found. It began with a closed deserted diner, and a man too long without sleep to continue his journey. It began with the landing of a craft from another galaxy. Now David Vincent knows that the Invaders are here, that they have taken human form. Somehow he must convince a disbelieving world that the nightmare has already begun.

Then, in a manner typical of Quinn Martin productions, Wesson would announce, "The guest stars in tonight's story...", and announce the name of each guest star (typically three or four) over a series of close-up clips of the guest stars. Wesson would then announce "Tonight's Episode", and say the title of the episode about to be viewed, which would also appear on screen.

Also typical of Quinn Martin productions of the time, the show was divided into "Acts" labeled by the Roman numerals I-IV, preceded by a cold open. A narration preceded Act I, and Act IV came before an Epilog with narration at the end.

Dominic Frontiere, who had provided scores for Twelve O'Clock High and The Outer Limits, provided scores for The Invaders as well.

== Episodes ==
=== Season 1 (1967) ===
No. overall	No. in season	Title	Directed by	Written by	Original release date
1	1	"Beachhead"	Joseph Sargent	Anthony Wilson	January 10, 1967
Driving home late one night from a business trip, an exhausted David Vincent takes a nap at a deserted country spot and is awakened by a landing spacecraft. Nobody believes him, not his business partner Alan Landers (James Daly) nor Police Lieutenant Ben Holman (J. D. Cannon), especially when two aliens disguised as honeymooners claim they were there all night and saw nothing. Vincent notices, however, that the groom's small finger is extended. When Vincent returns the next day to question them further, the groom mentions to the bride that he is almost out of time. A fight breaks out between the groom and Vincent as Vincent insists on seeing the man's hands. During the fight the man starts to glow. Vincent is knocked out and awakens in a hospital. Later, when he is resting at home, someone starts a fire in his apartment from which he barely escapes. He travels to the ostensible couple's isolated, dying hometown and discovers a secret alien base there. Unfortunately, he suspects local Sheriff Lou Carver of being an alien instead of Kathy Adams (Diane Baker). She is actually an imposter who falsely claims to be one of the town's few remaining residents. When Vincent realizes she is an alien, he looks at her hand and she says, "not all of us are like that." Vincent goes to look for Landers, whom he has convinced to come see what he has found. His friend is lured into a fatal ambush instead by innocent-looking "Aunt Sara" (Ellen Corby). The American season-one DVD release also has an extended version of the pilot episode, which was never seen on broadcast television.
2	2	"The Experiment"	Joseph Sargent	Anthony Spinner	January 17, 1967
In Pennsylvania, eminent astrophysicist Professor Curtis Lindstrom (Laurence Naismith) claims in the newspapers to have documentary proof that Earth is being secretly invaded. He is to reveal this proof at an upcoming conference. Unsure of Vincent's intentions, Lindstrom still takes his advice after avoiding one attempt on his life and goes into hiding, telling only his son Lloyd (Roddy McDowall) of his location. Lloyd, unfortunately, has been brainwashed by the aliens. Lindstrom is killed. Vincent finds Lindstrom's evidence, but is promptly captured, betrayed by Lloyd. Vincent is run through a brainwashing machine, but it does not do its job. Vincent struggles with Lloyd, preventing him from taking the pills that keep him under alien control. Lloyd wakes up, destroys the machine, and rescues Vincent, but is killed in the process.
3	3	"The Mutation"	Paul Wendkos	David Chandler	January 24, 1967
Vincent arrives in south Texas just as the U.S. Air Force is winding down an unsuccessful investigation of a reported UFO landing. Reporter Mark Evans (Edward Andrews) introduces him to stripper Vikki (Suzanne Pleshette), who claims to have seen where it set down. It is a trap; both Vikki and Evans are Invaders. Vikki, however, is a mutation: she can experience emotions such as love and empathy. Attracted to Vincent, she warns him just in time. Her divided loyalties cause her to serve first one side, then the other. In the end, she chooses Vincent, at the cost of her own life.
4	4	"The Leeches"	Paul Wendkos	Dan Ullman	January 31, 1967
After a series of kidnappings of top scientists and inventors, Warren Doneghan (Arthur Hill), the president of an electronics company in Arizona, is convinced he is next. Believing that aliens are responsible, he contacts Vincent. David persuades him to allow himself to be taken. A hidden homing device leads Vincent and Tom Wiley (Mark Richman), Doneghan's skeptical chief of security, to the Invader base in New Mexico. They arrive barely in time to save Doneghan from having his knowledge extracted from his brain. Wiley is killed, but Doneghan survives; Vincent acquires his first ally.
5	5	"Genesis"	Richard Benedict	John W. Bloch	February 7, 1967
In Rhode Island, a motorcycle cop (Phillip Pine) pulls over a station wagon. When he insists on seeing what is in the curtained-off rear compartment, the experience unhinges his mind. Though he somehow manages to escape with his life, he becomes catatonic. At the hospital, the man's friend and fellow policeman, Lieutenant Greg Lucather (John Larch), ignores Vincent's warning that the Invaders will try again. However, when Greg later shoots and kills an alien trying to silence Vincent, he becomes a bit less skeptical. The station wagon is traced to the Newport Sea Lab. Vincent eventually discovers that a new wing is being used to try to restore an ailing but very important Invader to human form. Loss of this alien leader would set the invasion back months or even years. Vincent and Lucather foil the scheme and the Invader dies, but a fire destroys all of the evidence.
6	6	"Vikor"	Paul Wendkos	Michael Adams	February 14, 1967
In Florida, a telephone lineman sees a "man" glowing or burning in a transparent tube (needed periodically by the aliens to maintain their human form) at Vikor Enterprises. Before he can be silenced, his story finds its way into the newspapers, bringing David Vincent. He discovers that the company's embittered president, George Vikor (Jack Lord), has made a deal with Invader Mr. Nexus (Alfred Ryder); in exchange for mass producing the regeneration chambers, he and his beloved but neglected wife Sherri (Diana Hyland) are to be masters, not slaves, in the new world order. When Sherri refuses to go along and instead helps Vincent, Vikor chooses the power he craves over her. However, Vincent manages to deceive Nexus into believing that Vikor is actually a government agent. The Invaders kill Vikor and remove all traces of their work at the plant. This is the first episode to show the "regeneration" of Invaders.
7	7	"Nightmare"	Paul Wendkos	John Kneubuhl	February 21, 1967
When Kansas schoolteacher Ellen Woods (Kathleen Widdoes) visits one of her students, she stumbles upon an alien machine in a barn. She flees, pursued by a swarm of locusts controlled by the device, and she reports her experience to the newspapers, but later recants. Vincent encounters small-town hostility to strangers stirring up trouble, particularly from Ellen's fiance Ed Gidney (James T. Callahan), in addition to Invaders in key positions of authority. However, he stumbles upon a hidden broadcasting station and surmises that it is designed to provoke normally harmless insects into attacking humanity. High school principal Oliver Ames (Robert Emhardt) and Miss Havergill (Jeanette Nolan) forcibly take Ellen back to the barn for elimination, but Vincent and Ed rescue her. The aliens destroy their installation and leave.
8	8	"Doomsday Minus One"	Paul Wendkos	Louis Vittes	February 28, 1967
Vincent is summoned by Charlie Spence and Major Rick Graves (William Windom), head of security at a U.S. Army base in the Utah desert. Vincent discovers that General Theodore Beaumont (Andrew Duggan), the base commander and Graves' close friend, is in league with the Invaders, led by Carl Wyeth (Robert Osterloh). The aliens plan to detonate an antimatter bomb at the same time and place as a scheduled nuclear test and cause millions of deaths. When confronted by Vincent and Graves, Beaumont reveals that he intends to use the explosion to expose the Invaders. However, when Vincent proves to him that the Invaders have been one step ahead of him all the time, they join forces. Beaumont foils the scheme by driving the bomb out into the empty desert, where Wyeth and he are vaporized in the blast. Major Graves testifies at length to an Army board, but fails to convince them that anyone other than "persons unknown" had breached military security.
9	9	"Quantity: Unknown"	Sutton Roley	S : Clyde Ware; T : Don Brinkley	March 7, 1967
In Ohio, the wreckage of a small airplane yields no bodies, only an unusually light, sealed metal cylinder. The Invaders try to hijack it while it is en route to a laboratory for analysis. The newspaper story brings Vincent to the scene. He persuades A.J. Richards (Milton Selzer), the head of the lab, to set up a trap with a fake duplicate, but no one takes the bait. Security guard Harry Swain (James Whitmore) knows about the Invaders – his wife and daughter were murdered by them – and nearly kills Vincent, convinced that he is one himself. When Vincent proves otherwise, they decide to steal the cylinder to forestall the enemy. Sympathetic researcher Diane Oberly (Susan Strasberg) fails to dissuade Vincent from taking it. When he becomes separated from Swain, Vincent takes the cylinder to Swain's military contact in New Orleans, Colonel Frank Griffith (William Talman), only to discover that both Griffith and Swain are Invaders using him to retrieve their invasion plans. However, Vincent has been harboring suspicions about them and manages to kill them both. Just before he dies, Swain places his hand on the cylinder so that when he burns up, the cylinder burns up with him – once again leaving no evidence behind for David.
10	10	"The Innocent"	Sutton Roley	S : Norman Klenman & Bernard Rothman; S/T : John W. Bloch	March 14, 1967
U.S. Air Force Captain Mitchell Ross (Dabney Coleman) gets into a shootout and kills a soldier acting suspiciously, but he is disturbed when no corpse is found after seeing a glow and discovering evidence of an incineration. Aware of Vincent's claims, Ross invites him to testify before an investigating commission with him. Vincent agrees, but has another matter to deal with first. Maine fisherman Nat Greely (William Smithers) has had his own encounter with the aliens and comes away with one of their disc weapons. However, when his wife and son are threatened, he reluctantly leads Vincent into a trap. Instead of killing Vincent, Magnus (Michael Rennie), the Invader leader, uses a mind-control device to try to brainwash him into believing they have decided on a peaceful approach; inside this dream sequence, Vincent's unrealized architectural dreams and his old flame Helen (Katherine Justice) are revealed. When Vincent realizes they are lying, Magnus forces him to telephone Ross and claim that his story was just a hoax. Vincent and Greely escape a staged car accident, but Vincent is unable to convince Ross he was acting under duress, and the commission is disbanded. However, after Vincent leaves his office, Ross telephones security and orders a complete background check on the Air Force sergeant Vincent claimed was an alien.
11	11	"The Ivy Curtain"	Joseph Sargent	Don Brinkley	March 21, 1967
When charter pilot Barney Cahill (Jack Warden) is forced to make an emergency landing in a storm, one of his passengers is injured. To Cahill's puzzlement, the "man" is not in pain or bleeding. The passengers take the pilot with them to their destination: Midlands Academy in New Mexico. The head of the institution, Dr. Reynard (Murray Matheson), offers him a great deal of money to forget what he has seen and keep on flying in new pupils. Cahill accepts. David Vincent, following a familiar Invader (David Sheiner) he has encountered by chance, ends up at the same campus, and he finds it to be a training center where newcomers to Earth are trained to mimic humans and exploit their emotions. The charade goes so far as intelligently discussing salient political and cultural issues of the times. Vincent is spotted, but manages to get away. When he contacts Cahill, the pilot reluctantly agrees to bring his next batch of passengers to Vincent and waiting police. However, Cahill's much younger wife Stacy (Susan Oliver), eager for the money, alerts the Invaders, unaware of their true nature. The aliens intercept and kill the policemen. Vincent warns Cahill by radio that the airport is now under their control; Cahill, realizing he has been betrayed by his own wife, crashes his airplane into Midlands Academy. Blooper alert: when Vincent's driver license is shown on screen, he is shown as 5' 9" tall. However, during a briefing of students, he is referred to as 5' 11".
12	12	"The Betrayed"	John Meredyth Lucas	S : Theodore Sturgeon; S/T : John W. Bloch	March 28, 1967
Suspecting alien activity in Houston, Vincent goes to work for Simon Carver (Ed Begley), owner of Carver Oil Fields. Carver's daughter Susan (Laura Devon) and he fall in love. After months of nighttime vigil, Vincent witnesses a UFO landing, guided in by a control center hidden inside an oil tanker railroad car. He sneaks in and steals a computer tape, which he takes to electronics expert Neal Taft (Norman Fell) for decoding. Susan is blackmailed by Evelyn Bowers (Nancy Wickwire), who has uncovered her father's shady business past, into revealing when and where Vincent is to meet secretly with Taft's brother Joey. As a result, Joey is killed. When Vincent confronts her, Susan is guilt-stricken. She provides him with a vital bit of information: Evelyn and the other Invaders are desperate to find out how much Vincent has learned from the tape; something very important is scheduled for that night, something whose failure would set the invasion back a year. Vincent has her telephone Evelyn and tell her he knows nothing. Meanwhile, Taft uses his old NASA contacts to get them to come to the flying saucer landing site. However, the aliens capture Susan and determine she is lying. The mission is aborted, Evelyn is executed for her repeated failures, and the control room is destroyed. Susan dies in Vincent's arms, a victim of the radiation from the self-destruct device. Noted science-fiction author Theodore Sturgeon co-wrote the story.
13	13	"Storm"	Paul Wendkos	John Kneubuhl	April 4, 1967
An odd out-of-season hurricane devastates the Florida coast, all except the community of St. Matthew Beach. Two men decide to investigate these anomalies. Meteorological scientist Professor Gantley is killed after he sneaks aboard a fishing boat, which had been sighted in the eye of the storm, and finds mysterious machinery. Vincent finds out that Gantley had spent a lot of time in the local church. When he goes there, he is injured in a fight with two Invaders. Recuperating in the residence of Father Joe Correlli (Joseph Campanella), Vincent narrowly avoids being driven insane by a drug secretly administered by housekeeper Lisa (BarBara Luna). Vincent and Correlli discover that equipment hidden in the church and on the boat are being used to generate unnatural hurricanes. When they foil the scheme, one of the aliens commits suicide with the intention of using his automatic self-immolation to destroy the equipment as well. Correlli cannot bring himself to shoot Lisa, so she and a confederate escape.
14	14	"Panic"	Robert Butler	Robert Sherman	April 11, 1967
In West Virginia, Nick Baxter (Robert Walker Jr.) hitches a ride with some truckers. However, when he spots two men in a car waiting by the roadside, he struggles with the driver to get out. Soon after, the big rig comes to a stop; the driver's partner is horrified to find him frozen ... in the middle of Summer. More mysterious deaths by freezing are reported. Vincent tracks the Invader down and captures him. Baxter admits he has contracted a disease from his world that is killing him slowly, but it is a quick death for any human with whom he comes into contact. But as innocent as he desperately tries to appear, the smooth-talking young "man" still seems a trifle careless about whom he happens to touch. He and Vincent flee on foot from other Invaders into the hills, where they come upon a young woman, Madeline Flagg (Lynn Loring, Roy Thinnes' future wife). Her father Gus (R. G. Armstrong) agrees to call the sheriff from the nearest telephone for $10. Vincent ties Baxter up, but when David loses consciousness due to an earlier head injury, Baxter convinces Madeline to untie him. She guides him to where he claims witnesses can confirm his innocence. Vincent and Gus finally rescue her. They see a flying saucer unloading its cargo. When Gus tries to sound a fire alarm Baxter kills him and then runs to the departing saucer. But his reception is not what he had expected; he is vaporized.
15	15	"Moonshot"	Paul Wendkos	T : John W. Bloch; S/T : Rita Lakin	April 18, 1967
In the Florida keys, astronauts scheduled to go on the first mission to the Moon are killed at sea by a mysterious red fog generated by a helicopter. Gavin Lewis (Peter Graves), in charge of security, seems to dismiss Vincent's theories, but he has his own suspicions. Lewis himself was once selected for the Moon mission, but something happened one night that he cannot remember and he inexplicably ended up with high blood pressure that disqualified him. He also has a witness to the incident, beachcomber Charlie Coogan (Strother Martin). Vincent questions Coogan, but is too late; the aliens have brainwashed him into forgetting. Nonetheless, Vincent figures out that Commander Hardy Smith (John Ericson), one of the replacement astronauts, is actually an alien saboteur. Though Lewis cannot divulge the information, a secret part of the mission is to determine if certain structures photographed on the Moon are artificial or not. When Vincent gets Hardy's wife Angela (Joanne Linville) to admit the man is not her husband, Stan Arthur (Kent Smith) orders the fake Hardy Smith to report to his office. However, the impostor somehow manages to hijack the rocket and destroy it. Lewis is convinced of Vincent's claims, but no solid evidence remains. The episode also features Robert Knapp as Lt. Colonel Howell.
16	16	"Wall of Crystal"	Joseph Sargent	T : Don Brinkley; S/T : Dan Ullman	May 2, 1967
In California, two young newlyweds (including Peggy Lipton) cause an accident involving a truck carrying chemicals. Strange crystals are strewn on the side of the road; as they sublimate, they cause the couple to suffocate to death. Vincent later finds one of the crystals buried in the dirt and convinces well-known reporter and radio show host Theodore Booth (Burgess Meredith) to have it analyzed. However, Invader Taugus (Edward Asner) has the researcher killed, kidnaps Vincent's brother (Linden Chiles) and threatens his pregnant sister-in-law (Julie Sommars). Taugus explains to Dr. Robert Vincent that the crystals are intended to convert Earth's atmosphere into something more congenial to them. This happens to involve the destruction of most of the oxygen. Vincent rescues his sibling, but both Booth and Taugus are killed in the resulting struggle.
17	17	"The Condemned"	Richard Benedict	Robert Sherman	May 9, 1967
In Oregon, Morgan Tate (Ralph Bellamy) unknowingly leases his communications laboratory to Invader Lewis Dunn (Murray Hamilton). When he discovers who and what Dunn is, he steals some extremely valuable data. Pursued, he hides the folder of information in the plant and flees, only to have his truck forced off the road. He manages to get out and hide before the aliens vaporize the vehicle. A little girl sees this and the story makes its way into the newspapers. When Vincent visits the lab, he is attacked by a security guard, who falls off a cliff. Vincent is arrested, and the Invaders claim the man he supposedly killed was Morgan Tate. When a fisherman brings in a decomposed body a few days later, Tate's estranged daughter Carol (Marlyn Mason) is asked to identify it. Vincent escapes custody and finds Tate. Tate gets Vincent released. Meanwhile, Dunn uses Carol to force Tate to give himself up. However, Tate has told Vincent how to get into the building undetected. Vincent gets away with the folder, while Tate and Dunn are killed. The Invaders remove their communications equipment, and eleven highly placed agents (whose identities were listed in the folder) either resign, disappear or suffer fatal "accidents".

=== Season 2 (1967–68) ===
No. overall	No. in season	Title	Directed by	Written by	Original release date
18	1	"Condition: Red"	Don Medford	Laurence Heath	September 5, 1967
Falling off a horse, Laurie Keller (Antoinette Bower) is pronounced dead by a physician. He reports the death using a police phone, but he then sees the woman rise and is himself killed by three aliens. David Vincent, having read in the newspaper that the woman was reported alive by her husband, NORAD Major Dan Keller (Jason Evers), suspects that she is an Invader: since the aliens have no pulse, an unconscious Invader could have been mistaken for dead. Under an assumed identity, he joins a tour of the NORAD base under Cheyenne Mountain where Dan Keller works as a computer programmer. There, he is recognized by Major Stanhope (Simon Scott), the base's intelligence officer, who lets him investigate. It turns out that Laurie is indeed an Invader, and Major Keller is being forced against his will to figure out how to enable a squadron of spaceships to take possession of an island off the coast of Alaska without being detected by military radar installations. She has him replace one of the computer tapes. His suspicion raised, Major Keller confronts his wife. She incapacitates him, but he manages to kill her, confirming her true nature when she immediately burns to ashes. He calls the base to warn the military just as other aliens arrive and shoot him. At the base, the crew decides to switch to the backup program, thus spotting the incoming ships. After receiving a signal from Laurie's accomplices, the ships retreat. As Vincent leaves, Major Stanhope tells him that the Keller case will be buried, but that he will continue to investigate.
19	2	"The Saucer"	Jesse Hibbs	Dan Ullman	September 12, 1967
In Arizona, John Carter (Dabney Coleman) has called the local sheriff multiple times after witnessing saucers landing nearby again and again. Each time, the saucers are already gone when the sheriff arrives. David Vincent shows up and tests Carter's claim that he can predict the time of the next landing. When Carter's prediction proves correct, he and Vincent manage to capture the curiously unguarded saucer – proof at last! But one alien escapes and warns his comrades. Further complications arise with a bickering couple whose plane was downed by the saucer, stopping them from fleeing the country with stolen blueprints. Robert (Charles Drake) and Annie (Anne Francis) happen on Vincent, who is guarding the saucer while Carter goes for the sheriff and an expert. Annie is taken captive by the aliens, who have already killed Carter, the sheriff, and the expert. Eventually, the invaders use the woman to bargain for their spacecraft, and after a bit of a tussle, they manage to get away in the saucer, leaving Vincent and the couple to go free. This is the first episode in which an alien child (Christopher Shea) is seen in the pre-credits teaser.
20	3	"The Watchers"	Jesse Hibbs	S : Michael Adams; T : Jerry Sohl; S/T : Earl Hamner, Jr.	September 19, 1967
In Virginia, a hotel owner's mind is taken over by the invaders and he blithely attempts to stop an incoming aircraft with his body at the local airstrip. He fails. The aliens take over the hotel to await an expected guest named Paul Cook (Kevin McCarthy). As David Vincent investigates, Cook, an electronics genius with an aversion to people, lands in a small private plane with his blind niece Maggie (Shirley Knight). He is meeting several generals because he can analyze the nation's defenses and suggest improvements. The Invaders want access to those defenses, and they intend to take advantage of Cook's reclusive nature. Vincent discovers their planned substitution of Paul Cook and kills the alien manager and the substitute. The generals acknowledge that something is not quite right and promise a full investigation.
21	4	"Valley of the Shadow"	Jesse Hibbs	S : Howard Merrill; S/T : Robert Sabaroff	September 26, 1967
An unexpected series of events leads an alien to kill a human doctor in front of his wife (also a doctor) (Nan Martin). The alien is arrested and brought to the small town of Carterville, Wyoming. David Vincent tries to convince the sheriff (Ron Hayes) that the captive is in fact an alien. The alien's comrades try to rescue him, but they bungle the attempt and many of the townsfolk, including the sheriff, see him die in a red glow after being shot. The Invaders, desperate to keep it a secret, decide to create an earthquake which will breach a dam and flood the town, drowning all the witnesses. Vincent strikes a deal with their leader (Joe Maross). The aliens agree to figuratively 'turn back the clock' to when the alien was captured. In this way they are able, with full cooperation from Vincent as a key player in the charade, to use mind control technology to replace the residents' memories with new ones.
22	5	"The Enemy"	Robert Butler	John W. Bloch	October 3, 1967
An alien saucer crashes in the Utah hills and causes a huge fireball. Two aliens escape with a precious box. The fireball is seen by rancher and ex-nurse Gale Frazer (Barbara Barrie), who drives up to the crash site just as the one surviving alien Blake (Richard Anderson) vaporizes the saucer in a red glow. Fraser administers some life-saving injections and cares for the injured alien. Reports of the fireball bring David Vincent to investigate. When he finds the crash site and the box, he is confronted by the alien and the human female. Frazer, war-weary after serving in Vietnam, at first believes Blake's people are peaceful, but then Blake vaporizes the deputy sheriff (Paul Mantee). The situation is complicated by the arrival of aliens Lavin and Sawyer. They have come for the box, which will enhance the aliens' ability to live on earth without spending time in the regeneration chambers. When Sawyer and Lavin trap Vincent and Fraser in a mine shaft, together with the slowly expiring Blake, they order Blake to kill both humans after learning that the box has been destroyed. Blake, however, now near death, vaporizes Sawyer and Lavin and then begs David to hasten his own slow death, and Vincent obliges.
23	6	"The Trial"	Robert Butler	George Eckstein & David W. Rintels	October 10, 1967
In New Jersey, Charlie Gilman (Don Gordon), an old Korean War Army friend of Vincent's, stands accused of murdering Fred Wilk, whose body has vaporized following a fight between them near an open incinerator. The local sergeant (Bill Zuckert) thinks that the body was just thrown into the incinerator. District Attorney Slater (Harold Gould) is determined to obtain a conviction. Local lawyer Barnard (Russell Johnson) is hired to defend Gilman, but he does not want any mention of aliens as it would discredit his defense. Vincent is convinced that Wilk was an alien and, if necessary, is prepared to use that in his friend's defense. Wilk's wife (Lynda Day George), Gilman's ex-lover, is called to the stand. She casts reasonable doubt on Wilk's being human and thereby creates a conundrum for the judge (Malcolm Atterbury). Vincent starts to suspect that Slater himself is an invader. Vincent hires a man to research Wilk's background, and the man turns up evidence that part of that background was faked. However, Barnard kills him before he can testify. Following the murder of the hired man, the judge calls Barnard and Slater to his chambers along with Vincent. Vincent switches his suspicions to Barnard. He breaks a glass and uses a shard to cut Barnard's face. Barnard does not bleed, and is shot when he attempts to flee. He then vaporizes in front of Vincent, Slater and the judge. The judge dismisses the case.
24	7	"The Spores"	William Hale	S : Al Ramrus & John Shaner; S/T : Ellis Kadison & Joel Kane	October 17, 1967
In rural Colorado, alien courier Tom Jessup (Gene Hackman) and his comrades take delivery from a saucer of a briefcase containing spores. These experimental organisms, properly nourished, will grow into more resilient aliens better able to tolerate life on Earth. On encountering a random police roadblock, the aliens panic and are chased by Sergeant Ernie Goldhaver (John Randolph). The aliens crash, but Jessup manages to hide the briefcase. Two of the aliens vaporize in front of the sergeant and Jessup. Jessup is taken before Police Chief Mattson (Wayne Rogers), but denies everything. Mattson, himself an alien, convinces Goldhaver that he was just imagining things. As Vincent comes to investigate the crash site, Jessup returns to recover the briefcase. Vincent offers him a lift to a nearby diner. As Jessup makes a call, Vincent tries to take the briefcase. While the two fight, a barefoot girl and two young men run off with it. When the youths are unable to open the briefcase, they decide to return it, but as Jessup catches up with them, they put it in another couple's car. The couple eventually manage to open it, but are repulsed by the contents. They give it to some boys who, thinking they have 'seeds', plant them in a disused greenhouse. Meanwhile, Sergeant Goldhaver, suspecting his chief of being an alien, kills him in a scuffle. He then goes with Vincent to find Jessup. Jessup catches up with the kids at the greenhouse, but Vincent and Goldhaver destroy the greenhouse, the aliens and the spores.
25	8	"Dark Outpost"	George McCowan	Jerry Sohl	October 24, 1967
In California, an alien falls ill on the street and an ambulance is called by a concerned woman. On the way to the hospital the alien keeps repeating "Cavanaugh". The ambulance is overtaken by two other aliens, who kill the medics and retrieve their comrade. David Vincent, on hearing that both medics died of a cerebral hemorrhage, arrives to investigate. On questioning the woman, he establishes that the alien was repeating the word "Cavanaugh" and also that a nearby company warehouse is called Cavanaugh. Vincent sneaks into the warehouse, but is forced to hide in a locker. The locker is taken to a saucer. He subsequently blacks out under the tremendous acceleration of the ship's sudden takeoff. When he awakens, he discovers that he is alone and climbs down to a rocky desolate location, not sure if he is still on Earth. After wandering some distance, he encounters some student geologists with their professor Dr. John Devin (William Sargent), who tells Vincent that he is in Bowman County, North Dakota. Vincent tells them about the saucer. Dr. Devin feels obliged to investigate, even though the saucer has disappeared. They discover what looks like an army installation, possibly an alien base to Vincent. When Vincent scuffles with the sentry, Devin sees the sentry vaporize, and together with Vincent, they discover that the base is an alien hospital run by Colonel Harris (Whit Bissell). Vincent steals a crucial crystal from the healing machinery, but in an ensuing scuffle, the aliens kill Devin. Vincent runs back to the students' camp, but the aliens catch him and the students and pressure them for the component. Vincent hides the crystal in a truck air-filter where it falls on the ground, shatters, and is mistaken for a piece of broken rock by one of the students who puts it in her handbag. The aliens, disguised as military personnel, take Vincent and students back to the base where they manipulate everyone's minds in another attempt to reacquire the crystal. Vincent then realizes what the student (Dawn Wells) has in her handbag and plays for time. As Vincent sacrifices himself to gain the others' release, one of the students (Andrew Prine) rebels and kills an alien and sees him vaporize. He grabs a rifle and kills another four aliens who are attacking Vincent. The real military arrive to investigate, but find no evidence, though they do promise to take things very seriously.
26	9	"Summit Meeting, Part 1"	Don Medford	George Eckstein	October 31, 1967
The aliens start to raise the radiation levels on earth. The only country unaffected is Premier Thor Halvorsen's (Eduard Franz). The aliens, under the guise of saviors, convince him that they have the antidote, "AR5". Halvorsen calls for a summit of world leaders to discuss the radiation that threatens all life on earth; the aliens plan to kill all the world leaders once they are in one place, thereby causing chaos to facilitate a coup d'état by the aliens. Halvorsen is unknowingly surrounded by aliens, including their murderous leader, Alquist (Michael Rennie). Industrialist Michael Tressider (William Windom) is a crusader like Vincent, and having worked with Vincent in the past, summons Vincent from his work site to come to Washington, D.C. Tressider has learned of an upcoming summit, but has put his trust in the wrong man, American General Blaine (Ford Rainey). Blaine has sided with the aliens and traps Tressider at a secret alien installation to find out just how much he knows or might have told the President. Meanwhile, Vincent has made friends with Blaine's secretary Ellie (Diana Hyland) to collect his pass to the summit, supposedly arranged by General Blaine. When Ellie cuts herself at dinner and does not bleed, Vincent soon realizes that he is up to his neck in Invaders. Ellie, however, informs him about the real purpose of the summit, explaining that not all the aliens are in favor of this mass killing. She tells him that Tressider was lured into a trap, so she and Vincent head to the secret installation, an unused warehouse. Vincent manages to shoot an alien and electrocute two more, and drag Tressider out. Blaine is also electrocuted, but Alquist, Tressider's torturer, escapes. Vincent's aim is to get to the summit, but Ellie makes it clear that she will kill Vincent if necessary, even though she may not agree with the aliens' plot.
27	10	"Summit Meeting, Part 2"	Don Medford	George Eckstein	November 7, 1967
As the summit commences in a Baltic state from where the "AR5" will be launched aboard a missile, David Vincent and Michael Tressider (William Windom) arrive and catch up with Ellie (Diana Hyland). She warns Vincent that they may be under surveillance and arranges to meet him later in her room. They are in fact being shadowed by an alien who reports on their initial meeting. When Tressider and Vincent are granted an audience with Halvorsen, they are shocked to learn that Halvorsen already knows that Alquist (Michael Rennie) is an alien and is well aware of the Invaders' presence on Earth. Halvorsen believes Alquist is humanity's savior from the global radiation. Ellie tells Vincent about a file held by Alquist, which details his murderous plans, but when Vincent enters the room of Alquist's "aides", he cannot find the file and has to kill one of the alien assistants to escape. Tressider meets with the military chief but has no success with convincing him as to the aliens' plans. Meanwhile, Alquist holds a press conference regarding the antidote AR5, during which Vincent grabs a briefcase belonging to Alquist. The countdown starts for the launch of a missile that will disseminate the AR5. Vincent and Tressider examine the diabolical details and feel that they can now convince Halvorsen that the whole alien plan is a fake. Alquist sends his aides to retrieve the briefcase, desperate to prevent Vincent from seeing Halvorsen. When an Alquist aide traps Tressider, Vincent and Ellie, Ellie kills him. Another alien badly injures Tressider, but is in turn killed by Vincent. Vincent finally gets through to the military chief, who brings Halvorsen to meet with Vincent and Ellie in a corridor. Alquist arrives, but Halvorsen is convinced to stop the launch. However, when Alquist refuses to cooperate to stop the launch, Vincent pulls a weapon, and he, Ellie and Halvorsen race to the launch site in jeeps, pursued by Alquist and his closest aide. At the launch site, Vincent kills Alquist and his aide, but Halvorsen is too late to stop the launch. However, he sacrifices himself to remain and destroy the missile, while Vincent and Ellie escape. As the summit ends in confusion, Ellie and Vincent split up. Ellie reassures Vincent that the radiation will no longer be a threat, as the Invaders cannot live in a highly radioactive environment either.
28	11	"The Prophet"	Robert Douglas	S : Jerry DeBono; T : Warren Duff	November 14, 1967
David Vincent arrives at an evangelical meeting in Bakersfield, California to investigate a "prophet" who apparently glows red in a fashion similar to that of dying aliens. The prophet Brother Avery (Pat Hingle) does indeed put on a glowing display, but is led away by fellow aliens under the watchful eye of Brother John (Richard O'Brien) to a regeneration van parked outside. Vincent is prevented from getting close by "security" guards. Vincent contacts local journalist Bill Shay (Roger Perry) who, unknown to Vincent, is an alien and who warns Brother John. Vincent also seeks to infiltrate the faithful by introducing himself to Sister Claire (Zina Bethune). As the next service starts, Brother John lures Vincent to a supposed saucer landing site, but he is shot and killed by Vincent while trying to run him over. Later Vincent tries to get into Brother Avery's caravan quarters, but is interrupted by Sister Claire, who will hear none of Vincent's wild ideas about aliens. David persists, however, and she eventually gets him the keys of the regeneration van. Once inside, Vincent takes photos of the alien equipment, but Brother Avery suspects Sister Claire and orders her death. Bill Shay is sent to capture Vincent, but Vincent realizes that he is an alien and offers his photos for Sister Claire's safety. However, on returning to the stage hall, Vincent breaks free, kills Shay and other aliens and destroys the electrical power lines to the regeneration van. Brother Avery takes his own life.
29	12	"Labyrinth"	Murray Golden	Art Wallace	November 21, 1967
David Vincent brings an unconscious alien to a Doctor Thorne where X-ray scans show a fake bone structure. As Vincent discusses this with the Doctor's wife Mrs. Thorne (an X-ray technician), the alien wakes up and causes the doctor to have a stroke using a small disc-shaped device. David scuffles with the alien and kills him. Vincent then takes the X-ray scans to a prominent University in Illinois that has been getting funding for UFO research, but the aliens set up a bogus meeting as imposters and acquire the scans quietly from him. When Vincent divulges that he has a backup set of scans he is brought to the airport next day by a bogus alien taxi driver who tries to swap David's luggage. Vincent thwarts this plan and then calls the professors Dr. Samuel Crowell (Ed Begley) and Dr. Harry Mills (James T. Callahan) again, after which he realizes he has been duped by imposters when the real professors claim that they haven't met Vincent yet and are expecting him. When Vincent arrives at the office again, he meets the real professors, but is immediately suspicious of Crowell's daughter Laura (Sally Kellerman) when he notices a suspicious-looking scar over her right fifth metacarpal. His suspicions are strengthened when he discovers that Dr. Crowell has only been reunited recently with his daughter. Crowell and Mills then take David to meet Professor Harrison (John Zaremba) and all three professors declare their delight with Vincent's evidence saying that it will save their funding. Thereafter, David promises to get Mrs. Thorne (X-ray technician) to come to the University. On arrival at the airport, Mills offers to pick up Mrs. Thorne, while Vincent takes the opportunity to tackle Laura at a tennis court. David sees her talking to one of the imposters. When he subsequently confronts her, she labels him a 'crackpot'. Meanwhile, Mills picks up Mrs. Thorne and brings her to the University, but she disclaims the X-ray scans and discredits Vincent. Shortly thereafter, Vincent gets a call from Mills about discovery of an alien regeneration station. Vincent checks it out and finds the alien equipment. When Vincent returns later with Crowell, Mills and the Police everything at the station has vanished making Vincent look even more foolish. Back again at the University, Vincent accuses Laura of being an alien much to the anger of her father Crowell, and so the police are summoned. The police are aliens and are a bit rough with Vincent and Crowell protests to the point of following them to the 'station'. This leaves Mills alone with Laura. He quickly burns the X-ray scans thus revealing himself as an alien, and he then tries to terminate Laura. The alien police imposters take David to the abandoned regeneration station, but Vincent overpowers them and arrives back at the University just in time to save Laura after killing Mills and seeing him vaporize. All are now 'believers' and the University vows to continue unmasking the aliens.
30	13	"The Captive"	William Hale	Laurence Heath	November 28, 1967
At a Foreign Delegation to the United Nations building in New York, an alien intruder Sanders (Don Dubbins) tries to rob a safe with security information on troop movements in Asia, but he is interrupted by UN security staff and shot but only injured in the scuffle. The internal doctor Dr. Katherina Serret (Dana Wynter) cannot find a pulse and pronounces the intruder dead, whereupon he soon recovers. After further medical examination Dr. Serret declares that he is not human, much to the shock of the delegation leader Deputy Ambassador Borke (Fritz Weaver). However, Dr. Serret, knowing something of David Vincent, sends for Vincent to get advice, but Borke is a paranoid man on the edge and is confused as to whether the intruder is an alien or just a 'home-grown' spy robot? Vincent pleads with Borke to turn the alien over to the military, but Borke has other ideas and instead imprisons David Vincent together with the alien. The alien Sanders is well aware of Vincent's history and Sanders suspecting that the cell is bugged by Borke, tries to implicate Vincent in a plot by making out that Vincent is a comrade. Vincent finds the bugging device and rips it apart, at which point Sanders tells Vincent that it won't be long before 'his people' come to rescue him. Shortly thereafter, two aliens arrive in the guise of police detectives and meet with Borke to ask questions about a 'rumored' break-in. When Borke refuses to allow them search the building, they pull guns and demand to be taken to Sanders. However, they are overpowered by internal security staff and killed in a scuffle, whereupon they are vaporized. Borke becomes even more unsure as to what to do, so he summons Vincent and tells him that he will be forced along with Sanders to travel to the foreign country. Vincent uses a confidential meeting with Dr. Serret to effect an escape, but on climbing out over the fence he is immediately captured by aliens. David then does a deal with the invaders by saying that he can get Sanders out, but the aliens only allow Vincent two hours to do it. After involving a state department official, who is killed by the aliens, Vincent re-enters the delegation and persuades Dr. Serret to cause a diversion with Borke while he gets Sanders out before the invaders destroy the building. Sanders manages to escape, but when Borke comes close to being vaporized himself by the aliens, he becomes a 'believer'. Dr. Serret quits the delegation and returns to her homeland to warn her people about the Invaders.
31	14	"The Believers"	Paul Wendkos	Barry Oringer	December 5, 1967
David Vincent has finally gathered some serious support in his quest to stop the invaders in the form of industrialist Edgar Scoville (Kent Smith). As Vincent holds a secret meeting with his 'believers', Scoville (at another location) promises some heavyweight support and financial backing. However, the aliens are onto Vincent at his location in Singeiser Electronics and as Vincent exits the building with some believers, they are shot at and three of their number are killed including Mr. Singeiser. Vincent escapes with his briefcase to a car, but he is chloroformed from the back seat by an alien. Vincent wakes up in what seems to be an underground alien prison camp where Vincent resists alien hypnosis, divulging only fake details about the group of believers. When that fails, the aliens stage a 'dummy' rescue attempt, but Vincent quickly sees through it. David is then put into general circulation in the alien prison where he is befriended by Elyse (Carol Lynley). Vincent believes that she is also a 'captured' human and she explains that she is doing forced research for the aliens on crowd control. Together they plot an escape and when Elyse distracts a guard, they get out of the building through an air vent. With aliens in pursuit they eventually get to a hotel where Vincent questions Elyse about her work for aliens. She tells Vincent of a major plan by the aliens to cause mass murder in Los Angeles. Vincent listens carefully and then decides to bring her into the secret group, where she is introduced to Professor Hellman (Rhys Williams). When Vincent and Elyse return to the hotel later, Vincent gets a call informing him that Hellman has suffered a 'heart attack'. Vincent then calls Scoville and while discussing events drops a fictitious name 'Jansen' which is picked up by Elyse. Vincent sends Elyse to meet Jansen at a disused warehouse, but instead of Elyse, two aliens turn up looking for Jansen but somehow end up dead. Elyse turns up sometime later and David accuses her of working with the aliens. She admits it and says her brother is being held captive. Vincent then convinces her that her brother has been killed by the aliens already. Three more aliens arrive and Vincent manages to eliminate two of them when Elyse helps Vincent by creating a diversion. The third alien escapes. Vincent returns to the group and Elyse is accepted as a member.
32	15	"The Ransom"	Lewis Allen	Robert Collins	December 12, 1967
In Vermont, David Vincent is summoned by a Bob Torin (Anthony Eisley) who has seen strange alien activity at an abandoned ski lodge. He and Vincent arrive to investigate and as they get near the aliens' regeneration chambers in a disused outbuilding they are fired on by an alien guard. On getting inside they tussle with two more aliens and kill them, but a third alien leader (Alfred Ryder) calls on the guard to stop firing just as Torin gets injured. Vincent and Torin then capture the obviously important alien leader with the intention of bringing him to Washington and the alien leader only has seven hours before regeneration is required. The alien guard then alerts his cronies. As Vincent and Torin travel back to Washington they take a break at a motel and David calls Edgar Scoville (Kent Smith). Scoville tells Vincent to take the alien leader to Belding Army Base and to ask for Colonel Gentry (John Graham). Scoville sets out to meet Vincent at the army base. However, the aliens, desperate to rescue their leader, are following Vincent and Torin along the road and finally catch up with them at the motel. When the police also turn up at the motel, the aliens trick the police into leaving by labeling it a prank summons, but in the meantime Vincent and Torin and their alien captive get away on foot from the motel. Vincent sends Torin to Belding Army Base to meet Colonel Gentry. Meanwhile, Vincent takes the alien to a farmhouse to get help. In the farmhouse are farmer Cyrus Stone (Laurence Naismith) and his grand-daughter Claudia (Karen Black) and when Cyrus produces a shotgun, Vincent loses control over the alien. After scoffing at Vincent's story of aliens, and just as one of the aliens attacks, Claudia is forced to kill an alien intruder using Vincent's gun, but the body vaporizes, thus putting Vincent back in control. Meanwhile, as Torin arrives to see Colonel Gentry, he is cleverly diverted by the aliens and killed. When the aliens dump Torin's body back at the farmhouse driveway, Vincent decides to head for Belding Army Base taking Claudia with him for her safety, leaving Cyrus to guard the alien leader who now needs regeneration within three hours. The desperate aliens then bring a regeneration van to the farmhouse driveway. Meanwhile, Scoville has arrived at Camp Belding and senses that bogus soldiers have been at work. Scoville is worried about Torin's disappearance and David's safety, so he asks Colonel Gentry for some troops and a jeep. The aliens again cleverly capture Vincent and Claudia and bring them back to the farmhouse. Claudia gets away, but Vincent is himself electrocuted at the regeneration van when he fights with the aliens. Cyrus makes the aliens bring David back to life in return for the alien leader's safety. The aliens pack up and disappear before Scoville arrives.
33	16	"Task Force"	Gerald Mayer	Warren Duff	December 26, 1967
At the behest of Bob Ferrara (John Lasell), who is one of the group of seven believers, David is meeting publishing magnate William Mace (Martin Wolfson) and his secretary June Murray (Nancy Kovack) in New York City. Vincent and Edgar Scoville (Kent Smith) are keen to get Mace on their side, especially as Mace feels that his organization has been losing quite a number of its good top executives. Several of Mace's aides, including Mace's nephew Jeremy (Linden Chiles) scoff at the idea of aliens, but Mace calls Scoville saying that he is willing to let Vincent investigate. John Nivin (John Stephenson) is also a close aide of Mace's, but he is an alien reporting to Lund (Frank Marth). The aliens want control of the Publishing Organization so Lund starts by kidnapping Mace and his nephew Jeremy. Lund kills Mace and, knowing that Jeremy is having an affair with June, threatens to also eliminate June unless Jeremy (the new heir of the publishing organization) fully cooperates by putting Lund in control as chief executive. Lund, having killed Mace, fakes a car accident, after which David starts to tackle Jeremy for the truth. As the aliens take control, Vincent and Ferrara try to enlist the help of June to get through to Jeremy, knowing that Jeremy is weak and under pressure from the aliens. As Vincent, Ferrara and June approach a prearranged meeting with Jeremy at night, Nivin and another alien come out and shoot at them, killing Ferrara. Vincent kills the alien but misses Nivin. Meanwhile, Jeremy has been taken to Lund's 'fishing lodge' and when June finds this out, she persuades Vincent to bring her there, but they must approach cautiously as Lund and his fellow aliens, including Nivin, are there also. As Vincent and June attempt to get inside to talk to Jeremy, Lund is arriving by helicopter. Vincent finds Jeremy and persuades him to go talk to Lund and to try and take a guard's gun. As Jeremy approaches Lund, he loses courage. As David realizes that Jeremy is too weak, he and June try to escape but are surrounded by alien guards. As Vincent and June are being marched back to the lodge, Jeremy suddenly finds enough courage to grab a guard's gun, killing the guard. Jeremy marches Lund to the helicopter and Vincent and June also jump on board. Even as the helicopter is escaping, the aliens' high command orders Lund to be sacrificed, but the helicopter manages to escape and Vincent is wounded. Lund leaps out of the helicopter, killing himself. Jeremy, being more assertive, cleans out the alien aides from the organization and promises Vincent and Scoville his full support.
34	17	"The Possessed"	William Hale	John W. Bloch	January 2, 1968
At the Willard Sanitarium in New Mexico, a place of rest and convalescence, Dr. Martin Willard (Michael Constantine) is working with the aliens and his brother Dr. Ted Willard (Michael Tolan) is also cooperating but is not fully committed. Ted breaks into a laboratory by night to try to get a particular file but is confronted by alien Adam Lane (William Smithers) who overcomes Ted after a struggle. Just as Adam is about to kill Ted with an alien disc weapon, his brother Martin appears and dissuades Adam from doing anything rash. Adam then plants a device in Ted's head, with Martin's agreement, supposedly in the cause of research, but the device is causing Ted to be confused in his memory and actions. Martin is very protective of Ted, who happens to be an old friend of David Vincent's. As Ted recuperates at home after the lab incident he is cared for by Martin who wants to make sure to keep aliens away from Ted. He is visited by David Vincent who clearly sees that Ted is a troubled man. Martin has an uneasy relationship with Adam, and Martin is also under pressure from Janet Garner (Katherine Justice) who is Ted's fiancée. Her father who was funding the research has died unexpectedly, and Martin has denied her access to Ted and to the research lab. Vincent calls Scoville who agrees to send a spy technician to the lab to service some equipment. Adam gets suspicious and tries to stop the technician from leaving, but Vincent and Scoville come to his rescue. The technician confirms that there are mind control experiments using earth made equipment going on and that Janet's father's death was caused by a head implant device. With that evidence Vincent persuades Janet to call for a second post mortem examination on her father's body. This puts further pressure on Martin and Adam's relationship. Adam then secretly uses the mind control equipment to order Ted to Kill Janet. David breaks into the lab and overhears Adam issuing the kill order to Ted remotely. Vincent gets to Janet's house just as Ted arrives and knocks Ted out, accidentally dislodging the implanted device. Ted recovers and goes back to the lab with David. After a scuffle with Adam during which Martin is accidentally shot by Ted, Vincent subsequently shoots Adam, who vaporizes. Ted takes over the running of the sanitarium with Janet, and the aliens are given their pink slips.
35	18	"Counter-Attack"	Robert Douglas	Laurence Heath	January 9, 1968
David Vincent is working with a Dr. Kramer to advance the fight against the aliens by jamming their saucer's signals. As they are leaving Kramer's building at night they are attacked by two aliens. Vincent manages to overpower the aliens who are both killed in the scuffle, but Dr. Kramer is also killed. Kramer's briefcase with important material is taken by David just as the building's security guard arrives, whereupon Vincent tells the guard to call for an ambulance. Vincent keeps one of the alien's guns. David is picked up by Edgar Scoville (Kent Smith) who learns of his friend Kramer's death. Scoville takes Vincent to a meeting of the believers where he is introduced to Colonel Archie Harmon (Lin McCarthy) a friend of Scoville's, but an alien skeptic and not a part of the group. At the meeting Scoville hands over the briefcase material to his chief engineer and group member Jim Bryce (John Milford) with instructions to advance the material now that Kramer has died. Scoville's niece Joan (Ahna Capri) is another member of the group. Meanwhile detectives under lieutenant Connors (Ken Lynch) have arrived on the scene of Kramer's death and when they catch up with David decide to hold him for questioning. They baldly accuse Vincent of killing Kramer and taking his briefcase. They also find the alien's silenced revolver in David's car. The aliens under Lucien (Donald Davis), however, are closely monitoring Vincent even at the police station. Joan visits David at the station and tells Vincent that Scoville is still upset over Kramer's death and that he is reluctant to help Vincent. When an unknown lawyer has David released, Vincent finds that he has been fired from a building project owing to the bad publicity surrounding the Kramer accusation. He goes to a bar to drown his sorrows where he is befriended by Louise (Pamela Curran). She is an alien who swaps out his cigarette case for one with a listening device. David, however, isn't as looped as he looks and realizes what she has done. After pretending to be all washed-up, Vincent lets himself be taken by Lucien. David convinces the aliens that he will play their game and give them transmitter details, in return for status and money. The aliens only partly believe Vincent, so they take Joan as extra insurance. Scoville is also playing along with the charade and reveals this to Colonel Harmon, during a visit to where Scoville intends broadcasting his anti-saucer transmissions. Meanwhile, Scoville and Bryce manage to cause a saucer to crash into the ocean, and this elicits a bit of concern among the invaders. Vincent then leads Lucien and his aide to the transmission station where they let themselves in. But Scoville has set a trap and captures the aliens. Colonel Harmon is now convinced and calls Washington knowing that he has the evidence of the two aliens. However, the aliens vaporize themselves before they can be examined. Their auto-immolation is captured on tape. Vincent is acquitted on the murder charge and Harmon promises more support.
36	19	"The Pit"	Lewis Allen	Jack Miller	January 16, 1968
At the highly secretive Slaton Research Center in New Jersey, Professor Julian Reed (Charles Aidman) appears to be paranoid about the presence of aliens and falls from a balcony apparently running from delusional thoughts. He manages to call David Vincent before being committed to a psychiatric facility. Vincent calls on Julian's wife Dr. Pat Reed (Joanne Linville), who also works at the center. She invites Vincent to stay, but she is reluctant to discuss anything saying that she is just concerned for their young son, Frankie. Vincent then calls on Julian at the hospital, where Julian tells Vincent that he is convinced that aliens are either observing or controlling research into 'dreams'. Vincent goes to see Dr. John Slaton (Simon Scott), but he debunks any talk of aliens and allows Vincent to ask his own questions at the 'dream machine' lab. At the lab Jeff Brower (Donald Harron) is testing some equipment which reads heartbeats and David jokingly tests Brower and is satisfied that Brower is human. Vincent and Pat then go to visit Julian at the hospital, and when David tells Julian that Brower is not an alien, Julian has a relapse and accuses Vincent of being an alien. Vincent decides to leave town and to drop Pat back at the center. On arrival, however, they see a guard being attacked by a dog. The guard runs after being badly mauled but he subsequently dies and vaporizes. Pat is still reluctant to accept that her husband Julian has been right about aliens. Vincent then learns from Frankie that his father had been rooting around near a closed amusement park, so Vincent goes there to see what he might unearth. The place is crawling with aliens and after killing one, David manages to escape. Through Scoville (Kent Smith), Vincent learns that some major projects from the Slaton Center are about to be axed by Washington. Vincent decides to move to a hotel, but is captured by Brower, obviously an alien. Brower imprisons David in the dream machine to drive Vincent insane, just as he did with Julian. Meanwhile, Scoville and Dr. Slaton start to realize that major projects have been hijacked by the aliens. Brower tries to also capture Pat at his sleep lab, but Scoville and Slaton come onto the scene with a guard and in the scuffle Brower is killed by the guard. Vincent is released from the machine. Normality returns to Julian, Pat, and the Slaton Center.
37	20	"The Organization"	William Hale	Franklin Barton	January 30, 1968
In a suspected saucer crash in New York, some alien debris has been recovered by a cargo vessel. At the behest of journalist Mike Calvin (Chris Robinson) David Vincent arrives to meet him at the docked vessel only to discover that the evidence has already been removed. Vincent and Calvin are attacked by two men who are looking for something else – narcotics, and while Calvin escapes Vincent is captured and taken to an unknown location, where he is subjected to enhanced interrogation techniques. Scoville arrives to meet Calvin and to search for David who has been taken by Mob leader Peter Kalter (J. D. Cannon) who is just interested in recovering his shipment of narcotics. As Vincent claims that he knows nothing about the narcotics and is about to be executed along with Calvin, Kalter relents just as Scoville and some guards arrive on the scene. Kalter already knows Scoville as an eminent industrialist and is intrigued by the story of aliens having taken his shipment of narcotics. He offers to help Scoville but is rebuffed. Kalter comes under pressure from organization Boss Weller (Larry Gates), so Kalter finally persuades Vincent to cooperate in their mutual interest, much to Scoville's chagrin. When Kalter meets with his Boss Weller along with Vincent, Kalter finds out that one of his aides has been lying. There is a scuffle which ends with the aide's immolation. With Vincent in control now, the organization use their contacts to catch up with the aliens and destroy one of their regeneration chambers in a disused railway wagon (more commonly known as a box car). The aliens send a negotiation team to meet with Weller and Kalter and the aliens promise to return the narcotics in exchange for David Vincent. Weller has every intention of completing the deal, but Kalter wants to save David if at all feasible. At the exchange of Vincent for the drugs, Vincent is carrying a gun and he starts a scuffle by killing an alien. Kalter is initially reluctant to get involved but they end up overcoming the aliens together. However, as one alien dies he vaporizes the drug shipment by falling on it as he expires. Kalter pays the ultimate price for this unforgivable faux pas.
38	21	"The Peacemaker"	Robert Day	David W. Rintels	February 6, 1968
David Vincent and Colonel Harmon (Lin McCarthy) have captured an alien and brought him to Army HQ for questioning. The alien is put in a cell, but a bogus alien officer slips him a pill allowing him to vaporize. As the bogus officer tries to run he is shot and vaporizes as witnessed by the Top General Concannon (James Daly). The general, being convinced about the aliens' presence, asks Vincent to arrange a meeting with alien leaders. Scoville arrives on the scene to meet General Concannon, whom he knows and dislikes. General Concannon proposes to force the aliens to the negotiation table by suggesting that the military have a so-called 'doomsday device' which will be used to destroy Earth, unless aliens come to a peace agreement. The general is a two-faced bully and talks in his sleep, much to the disquiet of his wife Sarah Concannon (Phyllis Thaxter), whom the general occasionally (and shockingly) mistreats. The Alien leader (Alfred Ryder) agrees to a meeting, but he is suspicious and has David followed as he returns to a meeting with Col. Harmon at the general's house. The general, however, takes ill after eating some lobster and is confined to bed at home. General Concannon initially feels that he has been poisoned by the aliens and calls off the talks. Vincent returns to the alien leader and informs him that talks are off for now, but that he will try to restart them. The general then accuses Sarah of poisoning him. She confesses to this by saying that she wanted to prevent him from going to a meeting with the aliens after hearing of his plans as he was talking in his sleep. Col. Harmon has always been extremely loyal to General Concannon but now has doubts as to the general's sanity. The general has arranged a meeting with the aliens and military top-brass at a remote farm and has included Edgar Scoville on the guest list. The General forces Col. Harmon to accompany him on a B-52 bomb run exercise, but the general intends to bomb and kill everyone at the farm. Vincent learns the true meaning of events from Sarah Concannon and rushes to the farm realizing that the bomber is on its way. After an attempt to dissuade the general by radio, Vincent agrees with the aliens to have the bomber eliminated by an alien saucer. The meeting group splits up and everyone goes their separate ways.
39	22	"The Vise"	William Hale	S : Robert Sabaroff; S/T : William Blinn	February 20, 1968
David Vincent and Edgar Scoville (Kent Smith) are monitoring an alien drop-off point, whereby the aliens deposit a briefcase with a garage attendant. Vincent follows the attendant and scuffles with him to get the briefcase. Scoville tries to block the other alien from escaping, but the invader gets away. When Vincent kills the alien attendant, the vaporization causes a small fire in the garage which damages the contents of the briefcase. Nevertheless, Vincent is able to determine that the aliens have infiltrated high government circles in Washington and that one important alien Arnold Warren (Roscoe Lee Browne), who happens to be black, is about to be promoted to oversee an important space tracking project, thus facilitating alien landings. However, standing in his way is ex-policeman and now senate investigator James Baxter (Raymond St. Jacques), also a black man. Vincent tries to convince Baxter to investigate Warren more deeply, but Baxter scoff's at Vincent ideas about aliens. Nevertheless, Baxter remains suspicious. Baxter's wife Celia (Janet MacLachlan) is all for Warren's promotion, as she would like to see more Negroes promoted in our society. Vincent puts more pressure on Baxter, who agrees to a video link up with Scoville, after which he becomes less skeptical. Vincent tries to gather more evidence by visiting Warren's supposed father, during which Vincent is cornered by two bogus alien policemen. One of the policemen dies and vaporizes in the scuffle and Vincent is forced to hide out in a bar where he calls Baxter to get help. Celia Baxter answers the phone saying 'wrong number' then disengages the phone, obviously trying to keep David away from her husband. Baxter notices the phone off the hook and goes out packing heat to see if he can stop Warren from getting to a regeneration point. Feeling guilty, Celia drives down to where Vincent has been 'holed up' in 'Ollie's' bar. The barman 'Ollie' (Louis Gossett Jr.) learns that the cops are imposters. When the barman takes Vincent's side and kills a bogus cop, Celia witnesses the vaporization. Celia and Vincent escape from the area. Meanwhile, Warren is starting to degenerate, but has to make a speech before other aliens can get him regenerated. Vincent and Celia arrive at the speech venue and Baxter also arrives. As Celia creates a diversion, and Warren finishes his speech, the aliens clamor around Warren in the hope of getting him to the regeneration van. Vincent scuffles with an alien, but Baxter shoots and kills the alien before trying to get at Warren. The last remaining alien abandons Warren and escapes with the regeneration van. Warren runs out of time and vaporizes in front of Baxter. Vincent has stopped Warren and gained a new ally.
40	23	"The Miracle"	Robert Day	S : Norman Herman; S/T : Robert Collins	February 27, 1968
Beth Ferguson (Barbara Hershey) is fooling around with boyfriend Ricky (Robert Biheller), near a religious shrine in New Mexico. She is losing her shoes and is barefoot walking to the religious shrine. An alien is waiting nearby to exchange an important crystal device, but he is bitten by a rattlesnake, causing him to vaporize. Before he dies he hands the crystal to Beth saying "She will come for this." Beth sees the whole incident as being a miracle of God. The boyfriend Ricky doesn't witness the incident. David Vincent arrives to investigate the shrine and the sleepy town and lands at the bar where Beth's father Harry (Edward Asner) has the crystal on display and being gazed lovingly upon by a few locals. A young 10-year-old orphan boy Johnny (Christopher Shea) hangs around Harry doing odd jobs and noses in on just about everything that is going on. Vincent offers Harry money for the crystal, and both are being watched by the aliens. As Vincent and Harry discuss prices, an alien tries to quietly steal back the crystal. There is a scuffle and the alien escapes. Harry manages to retrieve the crystal but now sees it as having more value. The alien runs to report his failure, but David catches up with him. The alien self-destructs, vaporizing and nearly taking Vincent with him. When Vincent returns to the bar, Beth vetoes the sale of the crystal, much to Harry's dismay. He really needs the money because the bar is slowly failing. As she walks down the town Vincent tries again to persuade her to no avail and then warns her that some very nasty people may bring harm to her and her father. She remains defiant. As Beth exhibits the crystal at the bar, Father Paul (Arch Johnson) arrives on the scene and admonishes Beth for the vulgar display declaring that only the Church declares miracles. Vincent makes a further offer, but Harry greatly increases the price. Vincent then needs to go to the next major town to effect a funds transfer from his bank in Manhattan. In the meantime an alien 'nun' arrives and asks for the 'gift'. Harry, however, has put the crystal in his safe and is not going to give it to anybody unless they match David's incredible offer of $1000 in cash. As Vincent arrives back in town and sits down to talk with Beth, someone attacks Harry and absconds with the crystal. Harry and Beth go with the sheriff to make a statement. The aliens suspect Vincent of taking the crystal. After knocking him out they search his hotel room to no avail as witnessed in full by young kid Johnny. Johnny taunts Beth but tells her that he knows where the nun hides out after which Beth discovers the aliens' regeneration van. Beth, now seeing the truth, runs for Vincent's help, but the van is long gone when they search again. Meanwhile, Harry calls Vincent saying he has the crystal, the robbery being a hoax, but Vincent is followed by two aliens to Harry's bar. There is a scuffle which causes leaking gas and as the aliens are shot by Vincent and vaporize, the bar explodes and Harry loses his money and his life. Vincent saves the crystal and compensates Beth and little Johnny before leaving as he had (allegedly) expected Harry's price to climb still higher.
41	24	"The Life Seekers"	Paul Wendkos	Laurence Heath	March 5, 1968
In Indiana, an alien called Keith (Barry Morse) is dying and needs regeneration and is being taken by Claire (Diana Muldaur) in a speeding car to a regeneration point. As the car breaks the speed limit, it is pursued by a patrolman Joe Nash (Stephen Brooks) who stops the speeding car along the highway. The driver panics and shoots and critically wounds the patrolman, but the patrolman shoots and kills the driver who vaporizes. Claire drives the car away with the ailing Keith leaving patrolman Joe injured on the ground. David Vincent arrives to investigate but finds the patrolman uncooperative and his captain Bill Battersea (R.G. Armstrong) quite hostile and protective of Joe, who is now denying having seen anything strange or unearthly. Captain Battersea has road blocks set up everywhere around the Indianapolis metro area, so the aliens are now pinned down and looking for a way out. Two special agents arrive to assist Battersea, Captain Trent (Arthur Franz) and his aide Rawlings (Morgan Jones). Keith and Claire keep their regeneration equipment at an old farmhouse. They devise an escape plan involving David and they lure him to the farmhouse. They claim that they are dissident aliens, against the invasion, and Keith is an important leader who needs to return to their planet to petition for the stopping of the invasion and to start a search for a different planet. They are pursued by other aliens and they need Vincent's help. Vincent is suspicious and is armed, so when two other aliens arrive to eliminate Keith and Claire, Vincent intervenes to save them. Vincent then calls Edgar Scoville to appraise him of the situation and he flies down immediately. Vincent then lures Captain Battersea to the farmhouse where Claire hypnotizes Battersea to escort them all safely out of the police cordon. However, the hypnosis breaks down at a critical moment which forces Vincent to kidnap Captain Battersea. Trent and his aide are investigating and Captain Trent takes over in the absence of Battersea. Scoville meets with Trent and defends David's actions. Meanwhile, Patrolman Joe has decided to tell the truth and calls Trent, but Trent is an alien and kills Joe in his hospital bed. Trent tries to corner Vincent, Keith and Claire with hostage Battersea, but when a road block incident goes wrong, aide Rawlings arrives and kills two real patrolmen. Battersea now realizes the enormity of the situation. Vincent and Battersea shoot and kill both Trent and Rawlings and another alien, and Battersea helps Keith and Claire to escape to an awaiting saucer. Claire tells Vincent he will not see them again, but they hope they will be able to stop the invasion. [This episode could be considered the last of the series as it marks a milestone in the overall story.]
42	25	"The Pursued"	William Hale	Don Brinkley	March 19, 1968
[This is a partial remake of the Series 1 episode "The Mutation"] In Virginia, Anne Gibbs (Suzanne Pleshette) is an alien woman prone to violent rages and is pursued by alien John Corwin (Gene Lyons) to the Sycamore Guesthouse owned by ex-police sheriff Hank Willis (Will Geer). Anne, a dissident alien that might attract police attention, has arranged to meet David Vincent saying she will defect and provide vital information. The aliens catch up with her before Vincent arrives, and Hank's wife, receptionist Hattie Willis, hides her from her pursuers. After the aliens go elsewhere, Hattie wants to call the sheriff, which results in a scuffle, with Anne killing Hattie in a rage. The local police arrive under Captain Tom Holloway (Dana Elcar) and the aliens return to try and confuse the situation by the use of disinformation. Vincent also arrives and takes a call from Anne, but her location at a local antiques store, is overheard by Hank. Vincent is followed to the antiques store by an alien who tries to capture Anne for Corwin, but after a scuffle with Vincent, dies and vaporizes. Vincent has called Edgar Scoville (Kent Smith) who has instructed Vincent to take Anne to a town called Cape View where they are to meet professor Charles McKay (Richard O'Brien) and his son Eddie (Michael McGreevey). Scoville arranges for a helicopter to pick them up at a baseball field. Meanwhile, Hank arrives at the antiques store just as Vincent and Anne take off. Also arriving is alien Corwin, who posing as a government agent, tells Hank to stay out of it. When David arrives at Charles' house in Camp View, Anne attacks Charles when a row develops, while Eddie and Vincent are preoccupied. Eddie, thinking that his father has been killed by Anne, takes off for the town hall where he is diverted by the arriving Corwin and his fellow aliens. However, despite Corwin's efforts, Vincent manages to get away with Anne in the helicopter overseen by Scoville. Corwin then orders the helicopter to be tracked by other aliens as it approaches Washington. Hank uses his connections in Washington to find out about Scoville's high level meeting. Scoville provides refuge at a safe house, but the aliens are already watching outside. Scoville, Anne and Vincent quietly escape through a back lane, but the aliens are still following. A scuffle develops in the car park near their government department destination and Corwin and his aide are killed and immediately vaporize. David takes Anne inside to a very high level meeting, but Hank is hiding in a corridor and kills her. She poignantly says David's name one final time as she perishes, and Vincent is clearly deeply affected. But her fiery death is not in vain as it is witnessed by a group of government building personnel who are standing nearby.
43	26	"Inquisition"	Robert Glatzer	Barry Oringer	March 26, 1968
David Vincent and Edgar Scoville (Kent Smith) are meeting with Senator Breeding (Alex Gerry) to voice their suspicions about the Senator's friend Arthur Koy always being in the vicinity of known saucer activity. Breeding will hear none of it, but after Vincent and Scoville leave, an explosion takes place killing the Senator in his office. Vincent and Scoville are called before District Attorney Andrew Hatcher (Mark Richman) a man with ambitions. Hatcher allows friend journalist Joan Seeley (Susan Oliver) to sit in on the interview. Seeley, however, owing to past incidents, is mistrustful of him as Hatcher often manipulates journalists to his own ends. Seeley finds out where Vincent and Scoville are based so she goes to warn them that Hatcher is not to be trusted. Vincent shows her some of the tracking equipment built by Scoville. Seeley goes back to Hatcher to persuade him not to prosecute Scoville and Vincent. However, Hatcher has made up his mind to initiate proceedings for a grand jury. Hatcher finds out that the bomb was made from Materials exclusively manufactured by Scoville's plants, but this alone is not enough. Hatcher needs more evidence, and his case is conveniently strengthened when a certain Dr. Stanley Frederickson (Robert H. Harris), arrives claiming that he is one of the believers but will be happy to testify against them. Boland (John Milford), Scoville and Vincent find out that Koy is about to leave town for Paris, so Vincent and Seeley break into Koy's house to trap him. When he arrives and opens his safe, taking out an envelope earlier given him by an alien accomplice, Vincent demands the envelope and a scuffle develops whereby Koy is killed. His ensuing self-immolation is enough to convince Seeley that the alien threat is real. Next day, Frederickson lies to the grand jury and says that the Believers had already decided to murder Breeding. Seeley leaves the hearing and goes to inform Vincent who has never heard of Frederickson, and he realizes that the aliens know now who the believers are. Meanwhile, Boland has partly cracked the aliens' plans for an imminent attack by means of a sophisticated computer decryption program. Seeley lures Hatcher to visit and listen to Vincent and they show Hatcher the plans they got from Koy. Hatcher pretends to be agreeable and says he will back off, but the next day he has all the believers indicted. Warrants are sworn for the believers' arrests, and Seeley goes to warn them. The believers need a better computer than they have in their basement, so Scoville supplies a backup at a research facility. The police arrive, just as they leave the house and Scoville is wounded, but Boland and Vincent get away. Seeley goes back to remonstrate with Hatcher, but he still won't stop in his quest. Hatcher takes Seeley to meet Frederickson at a safe place, but when they arrive, nothing is left of Frederickson except some ashes in the bathroom. Meanwhile, reports come in that Boland and Vincent have been seen in the vicinity of Scoville's research facility. Hatcher orders the police to capture them. Meanwhile, Vincent and Boland crack the remainder of the aliens' invasion plan and locate a transmitter in the basement of a hotel. Seeley arrives at the Scoville research facility just before the police, but as she creates a diversion, she is injured in a car crash, allowing Vincent and Boland to escape and head for the hotel. While Vincent and Boland pose as telephone repairmen, Hatcher visits Seeley in hospital. Vincent and Boland scuffle with aliens and Boland is killed. Vincent destroys the vital transmitter. Thereafter, Vincent meets Hatcher at the hospital, but Seeley has died. Hatcher is finally convinced and promises help for Vincent. The closing narration advises that Edgar Scoville will recover from his wounds, and that Vincent, Scoville and Hatcher will form the vanguard defense against the Invaders.

== Home media ==
CBS DVD (distributed by Paramount) has released the entire series on DVD in Regions 1, 2 & PAL 4.

On June 5, 2018, CBS Home Entertainment released The Invaders: The Complete Series on DVD in Region 1.

DVD Name	Ep #	Release dates		
DVD Name	Ep #	Region 1	Region 2	Region 4
Season 1	17	May 27, 2008	September 17, 2007	November 8, 2007
Season 2	26	January 27, 2009	February 9, 2009	July 30, 2008

Thinnes also provided audio commentary for the official The Invaders DVD releases. He has also filmed special video introductions for every episode, which are an optional "Play" feature on the episode menus. The "in color" bumper follows each of these introductions. Since the 1960s, recurring public interest in UFO lore may have helped to revive interest in the television series, and commentary on the DVD collections acknowledges that, in private life, Thinnes has kept up a strong interest in UFO-related information.

On May 5, 2019, "classic-TV" digital/basic-cable network MeTV began weekly airings of The Invaders as part of its "Red-Eye Sci-Fi Saturday Night" late Saturday evening/early Sunday morning programming lineup.

== Spin-offs and remakes ==
=== Quinn Martin's Tales of the Unexpected (1977) ===
The pilot episode of the series, "Beachhead", was remade in 1977 for another Quinn Martin series, Quinn Martin's Tales of the Unexpected (known in the United Kingdom as Twist in the Tale), where it was retitled "The Nomads" starring David Birney.

=== The Invaders miniseries (1995) ===
In 1995, the premise was used as the basis for a four-hour television miniseries revival also called The Invaders on Fox. Scott Bakula starred as Nolan Wood, who discovers the alien conspiracy, and Roy Thinnes very briefly appeared as David Vincent, now an old man handing the burden over to Wood. The miniseries has been released in some countries on home video, edited into a single movie. The first part aired on November 12, 1995; part 2 aired on November 14, 1995 (both in two-hour time slots).

== Reuse of footage ==
Several seconds of footage from the opening sequence of the flying saucer approaching Earth from space appears in the opening of the episode "The Innocent Prey" of the series The Fantastic Journey. It aired on June 6, 1977. In the plot of that final episode of the series, the saucer was a prisoner transport ship of the future which malfunctioned and crashed at night in the jungle. The full-scale saucer used in ground scenes, however, was physically different on the outside and inside from The Invaders one.

An image of the craft was used for the cover art of the book "The Rombella Shuttle" by Bill Convertito in 1977.

== The Invaders abroad ==
The series enjoyed immense popularity in France where it was broadcast and rebroadcast from 1969 to the 2000s. Roy Thinnes was invited to a screening of episodes in 1992 in Paris. Both seasons of the series were broadcast in Romania around 1970.. Several episodes aired in Hungary in 1980, running from July 4 to September 5 under the title Támadás egy idegen bolygóról ("Attack from an Alien Planet"). Newspaper reviews tended to be critical of the show being "more fiction than science", but it was nevertheless well received by viewers, as attested by references to it in popular culture at the time.

== In other media ==
=== Books ===
Ten books based on the television series have been published.

- Army of the Undead by Rafe Bernard (US, Pyramid Books, 1967) – the same story as Halo Highway
- The Autumn Accelerator by Peter Leslie (UK, Corgi (a Transworld imprint), 1967)
- Enemies from Beyond by Keith Laumer (US, Pyramid Books, 1967)
- Halo Highway by Rafe Bernard (UK, Corgi, 1967) – the same story as Army of the Undead
- The Invaders by Keith Laumer (US, Pyramid Books, 1967)
- Meteor Men by Keith Laumer (writing as Anthony Le Baron) (UK, Corgi, 1967)
- Dam of Death by Jack Pearl (US, Whitman (a Western Publishing imprint), 1967)
- The Invaders: Alien Missile Threat by Paul S. Newman (US, a Big Little Book from Whitman, 1967)
- Night of the Trilobites by Peter Leslie (UK, Corgi, 1969)
- The Invaders by Jim Rosin (US, Autumn Road Company, 2010)

=== Comics ===
- Gold Key Comics published four issues of an Invaders comic book based upon the series in 1967–1968, years before Marvel Comics published their own, unrelated Invaders superhero series.
- Whitman Publishing published a Big Little Book of the show titled Alien Missile Threat in 1967 as part of its 2000 Series (#2012).
