= Merely Players (play) =

Merely Players was a one-man stage show written and performed by Barry Morse. It examined the lives of a series of actors and others from Elizabethan times up to present day. The title is derived from lines by William Shakespeare in his play As You Like It:

All the world's a stage,

and all the men and women merely players:
They have their exits and their entrances;

and one man in his time plays many parts.

The two-act drama included several vignettes from the life and career of "mere player" Barry Morse, features over a dozen characters (three of them women), and two musical numbers. Looking for a stage piece that he could perform for benefits and fundraisers, in 1959 Morse debuted Merely Players on stage for the first time in Boston, Massachusetts. He later performed the show in New York City in 1965 (at the height of popularity of his television series The Fugitive) and in other cities for various causes and concerns, as well as for fundraising for local and repertory theater companies in the United States and Canada.

The most recent form of Merely Players coalesced in 1984 when Morse mounted a nationwide tour of Canada to raise both publicity and funds for the Performing Arts Lodges of Canada (PAL); retirement centers for performers (actors, singers, dancers, and others) who are connected to the performing arts. Following the tour, he continued to perform the show throughout North America for the next two decades, between television and film projects, including on a number of occasions to raise both funds and awareness for Parkinson's disease treatment and research. Morse died in February 2008.

Other significant productions of Merely Players included Toronto, Ontario in 1993; Portland, Oregon and Eugene, Oregon in 1997; Calgary, Alberta in 2000; and Atlanta, Georgia; Columbus, Ohio; and Tampa, Florida in 2002. He also did a show at the King's Theater in Annapolis Royal Nova Scotia.

The book, Merely Players - The Scripts, was published in 2003. The following year, in 2004, Morse debuted the show in London, England at the Theatre Museum in Covent Garden as a benefit for The Royal Theatrical Fund. A new comprehensive omnibus volume Presenting Barry Morse & Merely Players, edited by Robert E. Wood and Anthony Wynn, is being readied for future publication, along with the release of the show on DVD.
