= Barry Morse =

British-Canadian actor (1918–2008)

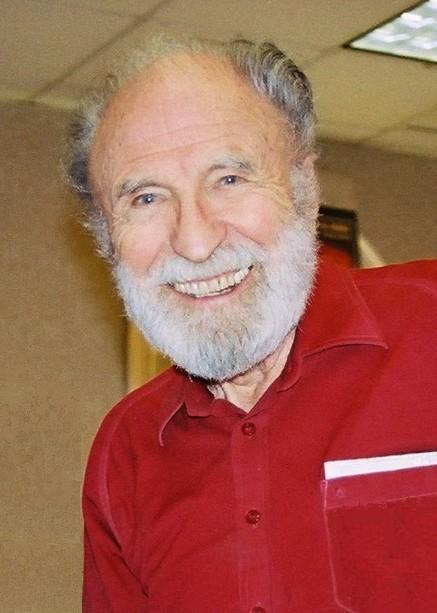
- Barry Morse in 2007, photo by Anthony Wynn
- Born: Herbert Morse; 10 June 1918; Hammersmith, London, England
- Died: 2 February 2008 (aged 89); London, England
- Citizenship: United Kingdom; Canada
- Education: Royal Academy of Dramatic Art
- Occupations: Actor; director; writer
- Years active: 1937–2007
- Known for: The Fugitive; Space: 1999; The Adventurer; Encounter
- Spouse: Sydney Sturgess (m. 1939; died 1999)
- Children: Hayward Morse; Melanie Morse MacQuarrie
- Website: www.barrymorse.com

Herbert "Barry" Morse (10 June 1918 – 2 February 2008) was a British-Canadian actor, writer, and director. He was known for playing Lt. Philip Gerard, the principal antagonist of the American television series The Fugitive (1963–67), as well as Dr. Victor Bergman on Gerry and Sylvia Anderson's science-fiction programme Space: 1999 (1975–76).

Morse's performing career spanned seven decades and hundreds of roles across film, television, stage, and radio. At various times, he worked in the United Kingdom, Canada, and the United States. He was a steady fixture of BBC and CBC television programming for many years, and an artistic director of the Shaw Festival.

== Early life ==
Morse was born on 10 June 1918, in the Hammersmith area of west London (he later claimed to have been born in Shoreditch in London's East End, but publicly-accessible birth records confirm Hammersmith), a son of Charles Hayward Morse and Mary Florence Hollis Morse. His parents owned a tobacco shop.

Morse was a 15-year-old errand boy when he won a scholarship to the Royal Academy of Dramatic Art. He performed the role of the Lion in Androcles and the Lion, and as a result, came to know George Bernard Shaw, a patron of the academy. His first paid job as an actor while still a student was in If I Were King. At graduation, he featured in the title role of William Shakespeare's play Henry V, presented as a Royal Command Performance for King George VI and Queen Elizabeth.

== Career ==
=== Radio ===
Upon graduation, Morse won the BBC's Radio Prize which resulted in several parts and a main role in the drama The Fall of the City. Later, among dozens of other roles, he played the lead in Shakespeare's Hamlet and featured as Paul Temple for the radio series Send for Paul Temple Again. He later performed on Canadian Broadcasting Corporation radio beginning in 1951 and continuing to the 1980s, including the long-running series A Touch of Greasepaint, the Joe McCarthy–inspired The Investigator, and 1984. He also featured in a number of U.S. productions during the 1970s and 1980s for producer Yuri Rasovsky, including The Odyssey of Homer, which won a Peabody Award.

Morse's final radio performance, Rogues and Vagabonds – A Theatrical Scrapbook, was distributed by internet radio KSAV on 7 August and 9 August 2007, prior to being released on compact disc format. The hour-long special audio drama comprised a half-dozen vignettes and performances culled from theatrical history, including Shakespeare and Shaw.

=== British stage ===
Morse was a member of repertory theatre companies in Peterborough, Nottingham, and other cities, where he gained experience as an actor while playing more than 200 roles. In 1941, he joined the national tour of The First Mrs. Fraser featuring Dame Marie Tempest and A.E. Matthews. He debuted on the London West End stage in The School for Slavery. Other West End productions included Escort, The Assassin, and A Bullet in the Ballet. He was directed by John Gielgud in Crisis in Heaven. Morse developed a theatrical partnership with actress Nova Pilbeam, and they worked together both in movies and on stage, most notably in the successful stage productions of The Voice of the Turtle and Flowers for the Living.

=== Movies ===
Morse made his movie debut in the 1942 comedy The Goose Steps Out featuring Will Hay and continued with roles in Thunder Rock, When We Are Married, and This Man Is Mine (released as A Soldier for Christmas in North America) with Glynis Johns and Nova Pilbeam. Other notable movies include Kings of the Sun with Yul Brynner, Justine, and Puzzle of a Downfall Child with Faye Dunaway. He also appeared in the thrillers Asylum (1972) with Peter Cushing, Funeral Home with Kay Hawtrey and Lesleh Donaldson (1980), and The Changeling with George C. Scott (1980). He worked on several Lacewood animated productions, notably as the voice of Dragon in The Railway Dragon, alongside Tracey Moore, who played Emily. In 1999, he featured in the dramatic comedy Taxman with Billy Zane, released as Promise Her Anything and on DVD as Nothing to Declare. His final movie appearance was in I Really Hate My Job, released in 2007.

=== Later stage work ===
Morse performed on Broadway in Hide and Seek, Salad Days, and the lead of Frederick Rolfe in Hadrian the Seventh, which he also played in Australia, co-featuring with Frank Thring. He directed the Broadway debut of Staircase featuring Eli Wallach and Milo O'Shea, a depiction of gay male life. He also featured in the U.S. national tour of Harold Pinter's The Caretaker as Davies. In 1958, Morse directed and performed in the Crest Theatre production of Visit to a Small Planet and later that year directed the Crest production of Salad Days.

He first presented a version of his one-man show Merely Players in 1959, which explored the experiences of actors through history, with the definitive version of the show debuting in 1984 for a Canadian national tour. Morse served as artistic director of the Shaw Festival of Canada for the 1966 season and as an adjunct professor at Yale Drama School in 1968.

In 1995, he premiered the Elizabeth Sharland play The Private Life of George Bernard Shaw in Toronto, also featuring Shirley Knight. The play featured Morse in the role of Shaw, with 10 actresses portraying the various women in Shaw's life. Morse later performed the play in 1997 at the British Theatre Museum in London.

With his son Hayward Morse, he featured in the 2004 North American debut of Bernard and Bosie: A Most Unlikely Friendship by Anthony Wynn, performed at the University of Florida, Sarasota. This two-act stage drama is based on the correspondence between playwright George Bernard Shaw, played by Morse, and Lord Alfred 'Bosie' Douglas (Oscar Wilde's intimate friend), played by Hayward.

=== Television ===
==== Guest roles ====
Morse guest-featured in more than a thousand drama, comedy, and talk-show presentations in the U.S., Canada, and Britain. Early American appearances include the U.S. Steel Hour, Encounter, and Playhouse 90. He also guest-featured on such TV series as Naked City, The Untouchables, The Twilight Zone, Wagon Train, The Defenders, The Invaders, The Starlost, and The Saint, episode: The Reluctant Revolution (season 5, episode 4). In The Outer Limits episode "Controlled Experiment", he featured with Carroll O'Connor and Grace Lee Whitney. In The Starlost episode "The Goddess Calabra", he guest-featured with John Colicos. In The Alfred Hitchcock Hour ‘A Tangled Web’ with Robert Redford & Zohra Lampert.

In his later years, Morse guest-featured in a number of Canadian-produced series, including La Femme Nikita and Kung Fu: The Legend Continues, as well as such British series as Doctors, Waking the Dead, and Space Island One.

==== Series ====
Morse's first television series was Presenting Barry Morse, which was broadcast for 13 weeks during the summer of 1960 on the Canadian Broadcasting Corporation. He was such a fixture on CBC television programming during its early years that he was humorously nicknamed "the CBC Test Pattern".

He gained widespread recognition for his portrayal of Lt. Philip Gerard, the principal antagonist of the popular 1960s series The Fugitive, who relentlessly pursues the hero Dr. Richard Kimble (David Janssen). According to The Independent,

Such was the popularity and compulsive nature of The Fugitive that the final episode was screened around the world on the same day, to keep the outcome secret. In the programme's homeland, 72 per cent of all Americans watched – a record until the conclusion of the "Who shot J.R.?" scenario in Dallas in 1980 – and, in Britain, more than 20 million tuned in. Morse found out the ripple effect once while eating out. "I was dining in a London restaurant," he recalled, "when the waiter brought me a note. It read, 'Kimble is in the kitchen.'"

His portrayal was so convincing that he would be accosted in public for the actions of his character, and he was once called "the most hated man in America." His biographer Robert E. Wood reported that he would humorously deflect by feigning ignorance and reverting to his native British accent (most viewers didn't realize he was not actually American).

Morse played Dr. Victor Bergman on the first series of ITV's Space: 1999 with Martin Landau and Barbara Bain; his character was dropped because Morse and his agent had balked at being offered a substantially lower salary for the second series. He also played Mr. Parminter in The Adventurer with Gene Barry, and Alec "the Tiger" Marlowe in The Zoo Gang with Sir John Mills, Lilli Palmer, and Brian Keith.

In 1982, he played the Reaganesque U.S. President Johnny Cyclops in the satirical sitcom Whoops Apocalypse in the UK and hosted the series Strange But True for the Global and the BBC.

==== Miniseries ====
Morse appeared in a number of television miniseries, including The Winds of War and War and Remembrance (both with Robert Mitchum), The Martian Chronicles, Sadat, JFK: Reckless Youth, and Frederick Forsyth's Icon. He was also one of the six principals in the 1972 BBC adaptation of Henry James's The Golden Bowl. Other notable miniseries appearances include A Woman of Substance, Master of the Game, and Race for the Bomb.

=== Books ===
The book based on his long-running stage play Merely Players – The Scripts (ISBN 0595273718) was published in 2003. His first autobiography Pulling Faces, Making Noises (ISBN 0595321690) was released in 2004.

Stories of the Theatre (ISBN 9781300669616) was published in 2006 and features material from his CBC radio series A Touch of Greasepaint, which was broadcast from 1954 to 1967.

His theatrical memoir, Remember With Advantages – Chasing 'The Fugitive' and Other Stories from an Actor's Life (ISBN 9780786427710), (written with Robert E. Wood and Anthony Wynn), details his life and career. The book features a foreword written by Academy Award-winning actor Martin Landau, and was released in 2007.

He wrote the afterword to Destination: Moonbase Alpha – The Unofficial and Unauthorised Guide to SPACE: 1999 (ISBN 9781845830342), published in 2010 by Telos Publishing, and written by Robert E. Wood. It featured a colour photo section of models created for the Space: 1999 television series by Martin Bower, and a foreword by Zienia Merton. Morse is quoted extensively throughout the book, as are numerous other series cast and crew.

Before his death, Morse wrote the foreword to Conversations At Warp Speed (ISBN 9781593932893), published in 2012 by BearManor Media, and written by Anthony Wynn. The book is a compilation of interviews with actors and other professionals associated with the various incarnations of Star Trek. It also contains a bonus chapter featuring an interview with Barry Morse, who worked with numerous actors who appeared in Star Trek.

Following his death, three biographical works written by Robert E. Wood and Anthony Wynn have been published. Valiant for Truth - Barry Morse and his Lifelong Association with Bernard Shaw (ISBN 9781105598326) was released in 2012; The Wit and Wisdom of Barry Morse - A Book of Quotations (ISBN 9781491233757) was published in 2013; and Two for the Road - The Lives and Love of Actors Barry Morse & Sydney Sturgess (ISBN 9798299210675) was released in 2025.

== Personal life ==
=== Family life ===
After a short courtship, Morse married actress Sydney Sturgess on 26 March 1939, during their work together in repertory theatre in Peterborough, Cambridgeshire. The couple had two children, Melanie Morse (1945–2005) and Hayward Morse (b. 1947).

In 1951, the Morse family relocated to Canada, where he worked in radio and theatre, and participated with the first television broadcasts of CBC Television from Montreal, and later Toronto. Morse became a Canadian citizen in 1953.

=== Charitable work ===
Barry Morse long patronized a number of charitable organisations, including the Toronto-based Performing Arts Lodges of Canada, the Royal Theatrical Fund, the London Shakespeare Workout Prison Project, Actors' Fund of Canada, the Samaritans, BookPALS, and Parkinson's disease treatment and research.

The cause of Parkinson's disease was special for Morse, as his wife of more than 60 years, actress Sydney Sturgess, battled the illness for 14 years before her death in 1999. In later years, he also became an advocate for senior citizens in his adopted homeland of Canada.

== Death ==
Barry Morse died on 2 February 2008 at University College Hospital, London, aged 89, after a brief illness. His body was donated to science, and on 3 April 2011 Morse's ashes were scattered in St. James's Square Garden, Pall Mall, London, England.

== Partial filmography ==
- The Goose Steps Out (1942) (with Will Hay) – Kurt
- Thunder Rock (1942) – Robert
- When We Are Married (1943) – Gerald Forbes
- Schweik's New Adventures (1943) – S.A. prisoner
- The Dummy Talks (1943) (uncredited)
- Late at Night (1946) – Dave Jackson
- This Man Is Mine (1946) – Ronnie
- Mrs. Fitzherbert (1947) – Beau Brummell
- Daughter of Darkness (1948) – Robert Stanforth
- No Trace (1950) – John Harrison
- The Untouchables (1961, episode: "The King of Champagne") - Michel Viton
- The Twilight Zone (1962, episode: "A Piano in the House") – Fitzgerald Fortune
- Kings of the Sun (1963) – Ah Zok
- The Alfred Hitchcock Hour (1963) (Season 1 Episode 18: "A Tangled Web") – Karl Gault
- The Untouchables (1963, episode: "The Globe of Death") - Larry Bass
- The Fugitive (1963-1967, TV series) – Lieutenant Philip Gerard
- The Outer Limits (1964, episode: "Controlled Experiment") - Phobos One
- The Invaders (1968, TV Series) – Keith
- The F.B.I. (1968) – Glen Parmenter
- Justine (1969) – Colonel Maskelyne
- Puzzle of a Downfall Child (1970) – Dr. Galba
- The Telephone Book (1971) – Har Poon
- The Golden Bowl (1972, TV series) – Adam Verver
- Running Scared (1972) – Mr. Case
- Asylum (1972) – Bruno (segment "The Weird Tailor")
- To Kill the King (1974) – Secretary
- The Zoo Gang (1974, TV series) – Alec 'The Tiger' Marlowe
- Space 1999 (1975-1976, TV series) – Victor Bergman
- Love at First Sight (1976) – William
- Welcome to Blood City (1977) – Supervisor
- One Man (1977) – Colin Angus Campbell
- Power Play (1978) – Jean Rousseau
- The Shape of Things to Come (1979) – John Caball
- The Martian Chronicles (1980, TV miniseries) – Peter Hathaway
- Klondike Fever (1980) – John Thornton
- The Changeling (1980) – Parapsychologist
- Funeral Home (1980) – Mr. Davis
- The Hounds of Notre Dame (1980) – Bishop Williams
- A Tale of Two Cities (1980, TV movie) – Marquis St. Evremonde
- Murder by Phone (1982) – Fred Waites
- Strange But True (1983) – Host
- Reunion at Fairborough (1985, TV movie) – Nathan Barsky
- The Twilight Zone (1988, episode: "Dream Me a Life") - Frank
- The Railway Dragon (1988, TV movie) – The Railway Dragon
- War and Remembrance (1988–89, miniseries) - Colonel General Franz Halder
- Glory! Glory! (1989, TV Movie) – Dan Stuckey
- The Birthday Dragon (1992, TV Movie) - The Railway Dragon
- Al lupo al lupo (1992) – Mario Sagonà
- Sacred Trust (1997) – Mon Farare
- Promise Her Anything (1999) – Reverend Adam Putter
- I Really Hate My Job (2007) – Old Man #2 – Georg
