= Richard Wesson (announcer) =

American movie and television announcer

Dick Wesson
- Born: February 20, 1919; Boise, Idaho, U.S.
- Died: January 27, 1979 (aged 59); Costa Mesa, California, U.S.
- Occupations: Film and television announcer
- Spouses: Mary Evelyn Pierce (m. 1941, one child); Betty Maxine Ross (m. 1946, div. 1954); Barbara Joyce Epstein (m. 1956, div. 1960, one child)
- Parents: John Edward Wesson; Juanita Fern Shaff

Richard Wesson (February 20, 1919 – January 27, 1979) was an American movie and television announcer. He is best known for his extensive work with Walt Disney, mainly as a narrator for various Disney films as well as theme park promotional material.

== Early life ==
Wesson was born in Boise, Idaho on February 20, 1919 to John Edward Wesson and Juanita Fern Shaff. The Wesson family had deep roots in Idaho, with the surname tracing back to English origins as a variant of Weston from the Midlands and Kent regions. Wesson's early childhood unfolded in the rural landscapes of southern Idaho and by 1920, the family resided in Shoshone, Idaho. During the 1920s, the family moved back to Boise, where Wesson spent much of his formative years. By 1940, Wesson was living in Oakland, California. He had at least one sibling, though details on family dynamics or specific early experiences remain sparse in available records.

== Career ==
=== Entry into entertainment ===
After growing up in Boise, Idaho, Wesson relocated to Hollywood, California to pursue opportunities in the entertainment industry. Wesson began his career in radio during the late 1940s, serving as an announcer for the science fiction radio series Space Patrol, which aired from 1949 to 1955. Alongside fellow announcer Dick Tufeld, he provided voice work that contributed to the show's popularity in both radio and early television formats. By the early 1950s, Wesson had expanded into comedic roles, signing an exclusive radio and television contract with NBC in May 1953 as part of a talent trio with country artist Eddy Arnold and comedienne Cass Daley. This deal positioned him for appearances in NBC's summer showcase series Saturday Night Revue, aimed at developing new performers for potential ongoing programs.

=== Professional career ===
Dick Wesson's radio announcing career began in the late 1940s in Portland, Oregon, where he worked as an overnight disc jockey at KALE. In May 1948, during the catastrophic Vanport flood that displaced over 18,000 people, Wesson assisted in the station's round-the-clock emergency coverage by being flown in KALE's helicopter to survey and report on the damage from the Columbia River dike breach near Woodland, Washington. By the early 1950s, Wesson had relocated to Los Angeles and joined the announcing staff for ABC Radio's science fiction adventure series Space Patrol, which aired nationally from March 1950 to March 1955. He shared announcing duties with Dick Tufeld, delivering dramatic intros and narrations that enhanced the program's interstellar law enforcement theme for young audiences. Wesson's resonant baritone voice and precise delivery proved effective for live radio broadcasts, establishing his reputation as a versatile announcer before the medium's shift toward television dominance in the mid-1950s.

=== Transition to television ===
As television broadcasting expanded rapidly in the United States during the early to mid-1950s, with household penetration rising from about 9% in 1950 to over 55% by 1955, radio announcers like Dick Wesson adapted to the new medium amid the decline of radio's dominance in entertainment. Wesson's extensive radio experience, where he honed his distinctive baritone voice and timing, facilitated a smooth transition to television announcing, though the visual format demanded innovations such as synchronizing voiceovers with on-screen action and occasional live introductions. His first major television role came as the announcer for the sci-fi series Space Patrol, which aired from 1950 to 1955 and bridged radio and TV formats during this era of media convergence. This work highlighted Wesson's ability to engage audiences in a medium that combined audio storytelling with visual effects, setting the stage for his further contributions to television.

=== Disney association ===
Dick Wesson developed a significant and enduring association with The Walt Disney Company, most prominently as the primary announcer for the long-running anthology television series that debuted as Disneyland in 1954 and evolved through titles such as Walt Disney Presents, Walt Disney's Wonderful World of Color, and ultimately The Wonderful World of Disney. From 1955 to 1971, with occasional appearances thereafter including in 1976, Wesson delivered the iconic opening narrations that set the tone for each episode, often introducing host Walt Disney with his warm, authoritative baritone voice, which became a staple of Disney's early television presence. Wesson's narration style, characterized by enthusiasm and clarity, helped convey the magic and wonder of Disney storytelling to audiences during the studio's expansion into television and theme parks. Wesson's involvement also included participation in Disneyland's inaugural events, where he served as narrator for the live ABC television special Dateline: Disneyland on July 17, 1955, broadcasting the park's chaotic but celebratory opening day to millions of viewers nationwide. Additionally, Wesson made on-stage appearances as an actor in the long-running Golden Horseshoe Revue stage show at Disneyland, performing in the Frontierland saloon production that entertained guests from the park's early years through the 1980s.

Through these contributions, Wesson's voice played a pivotal role in shaping Disney's brand identity during the formative decades of its television anthology and the debut of Disneyland, fostering a sense of excitement and familiarity for families tuning in or visiting the park.

=== Other notable announcements ===
Beyond his prominent association with Disney programming, which elevated his profile in the industry, Dick Wesson provided opening narrations for several notable television series produced by Quinn Martin Productions during the 1960s. He served as the introductory narrator for The New Breed (1961–1962), delivering the dramatic voiceover that set the tone for each episode of the police drama (uncredited, 36 episodes). Similarly, Wesson narrated the openings for The Fugitive (1963–1967), voicing the iconic prologue that recounted Dr. Richard Kimble's wrongful conviction and ongoing pursuit, appearing in uncredited roles across 30 episodes. His work extended to 12 O'Clock High (1964–1967), where he provided narration for the World War II aviation series, and The Invaders (1967–1968), intoning the suspenseful introductions to the alien invasion storyline in 42 episodes.Wesson's versatility with Quinn Martin continued into crime-oriented dramas, though his primary contributions were in these earlier 1960s productions before Hank Simms took over for later shows like The F.B.I. and Barnaby Jones. These narrations exemplified his booming, authoritative delivery, which became a hallmark of the production company's signature opening sequences. In addition to television, Wesson narrated trailers for various non-Disney films, showcasing his range in promotional work. A representative example is the trailer for Airport (1970), the disaster thriller directed by George Seaton, where his voice heightened the suspense of the airborne crisis narrative. He also made occasional acting cameos in unrelated programs, such as appearing as himself in uncredited announcer roles on The Red Skelton Hour (1953) and That Girl (1968).

== Personal life and death ==
=== Marriages and family ===
Dick Wesson was married three times. His first marriage was to Mary Evelyn Pierce on June 29, 1941, in Kelso, Washington; the couple had one son, Richard Lewis Wesson Jr., born in 1942, who died in 1963. Wesson's second marriage was to Betty Maxine Ross on September 16, 1946, in Portland, Oregon; they divorced on June 23, 1954. His third marriage was to Barbara Joyce Epstein on July 4, 1956; the union ended in divorce in 1960, with Barbara giving birth to one child. Wesson and his family were based in California for much of his adult life, including his final years in Costa Mesa.

=== Health struggles and suicide ===
In the late 1970s, Dick Wesson faced a terminal diagnosis of cancer, which marked a significant decline in his health during the final years of his life. Details regarding the specific type of cancer or the exact date of diagnosis remain scarce in available records, but sources confirm he was actively battling the illness at the time of his death. On January 27, 1979, Wesson died due to suicide by firearm in Costa Mesa, California, at the age of 59. This event occurred amid his ongoing struggle with cancer, though motivations beyond his health condition are not well-documented in public accounts. Information on the immediate aftermath of Wesson's death, including effects on his family or broader public response, is limited, reflecting a gap in detailed historical reporting on this aspect of his life.

== Filmography ==
As actor

Year	Title	Role	Notes
1953	The Red Skelton Hour	Supporting role	TV series, 1 episode
1955-1971	The Magical World of Disney	Various	TV series, 5 episodes
1957-1958	The Bob Cummings Show	Frank Crenshaw	TV series, 2 episodes
1960	My Sister Eileen	Ernie	TV series, 1 episode
1961-1962	The New Breed	Introductory narrator	TV series. 36 episodes
1963	The Fugitive	Introductory narrator	TV series
1967-1968	The Invaders	Introductory narrator	TV series
1977	Dog and Cat		TV series, 1 episode

As self

Year	Title	Role
1955	Dateline: Disney	Narrator
1960	My Sister Eileen	Director (5 episodes) Writer (6 episodes)
1976	The Magical World of Disney	Narrator, 1 episode
