= Anthony Wynn =

American writer (born 1962)

- Anthony Wynn, 2012
- Born: 1962 (age 63–64); Eugene, Oregon
- Occupations: Author, playwright
- Spouse: Adrian Flores

Anthony Wynn (born 1962, Eugene, Oregon) is an American biographer of actor Barry Morse, author of Conversations at Warp Speed, co-author of Remember With Advantages: Chasing "The Fugitive" and Other Stories from an Actor's Life, and playwright who authored Bernard and Bosie: A Most Unlikely Friendship.

== Playwright ==
Wynn's two-act, two-actor drama Bernard and Bosie: A Most Unlikely Friendship, explores the complex relationship between playwright George Bernard Shaw and poet Lord Alfred "Bosie" Douglas. It is based on correspondence exchanged between the two men in the 1930s and early 1940s. Having met in-person only once, the two—while from the absolute opposite ends of the spectrum—manage to connect and form a friendship. The play debuted in London, United Kingdom and has been performed in Sarasota, Florida, Lexington, Kentucky, and New York.

He co-authored (with Robert E. Wood) the play Two for the Road: An Actor's Love Story based on the letters, notes, and voice recordings of actors Barry Morse and Sydney Sturgess between 1939 and 1999. A staged performance of Two for the Road was given in Parsippany, New Jersey in 2017.

== Published works ==
Wynn is co-author (with Barry Morse and Robert E. Wood) of the books Merely Players - The Scripts (ISBN 0595273718) (2003), and Pulling Faces, Making Noises: A Life on Stage, Screen and Radio (ISBN 0595321690) (2004), the first autobiography of actor Barry Morse.

He edited Stories of the Theatre (ISBN 9781300669616) (with Robert E. Wood), published in 2006; the material in the book combines the drama, tragedy and comedy of theatrical history with tales of actors, actresses, playwrights and critics. He also wrote the foreword to the 2006 hardbound edition of the classic novel The Green Carnation (ISBN 9781411691513) by Robert Hichens (which was based on Hichens' personal relationships with Oscar Wilde and Bosie Douglas).

The theatrical memoir of actor Barry Morse, Remember With Advantages: Chasing "The Fugitive" and Other Stories from an Actor's Life (ISBN 9780786427710) (co-written with Robert E. Wood and Barry Morse), was released in 2007 by McFarland and Company publishers of North Carolina. Academy Award-winning actor Martin Landau wrote the foreword for the book.

Wynn's compilation of interviews with actors and other professionals associated with the various incarnations of Star Trek entitled Conversations at Warp Speed (ISBN 9781593932893) was published in 2012. Interviewees included in the book are: George Takei, Nick Tate, Grace Lee Whitney, Robin Curtis, Eric A. Stillwell, Armin Shimerman, Kitty Swink, Paul Carr, James Doohan, Bibi Besch, Gene Roddenberry, and Star Trek fans Marlene Daab and Carol Jennings. The book includes three bonus interviews with Corinne Orr, Gretchen Corbett, and Barry Morse. Morse also penned the foreword to the book prior to his death.

Following the death of Barry Morse, Wynn and Robert E. Wood also co-wrote three additional volumes related to the actor. The first was Valiant for Truth: Barry Morse and his Lifelong Association with Bernard Shaw (ISBN 9781105598326) (2012) based on lectures they gave to the International Shaw Society and the Shaw Society of England, in London.

The second book was The Wit and Wisdom of Barry Morse (ISBN 978-1-304-26056-7), with Robert E. Wood. The volume is a compilation of notable and amusing comments and quotations - sometimes dubbed 'Barry-isms' - recorded over the course of the actor's long career in show business. As Morse once wryly noted: "My dearest enemies will say that I'm a sort of circus horse; that it's all done by numbers. But a trick is the name given to technique by people who haven't got any."

The third book released was Two for the Road - The Lives and Love of Actors Barry Morse & Sydney Sturgess (ISBN 9798299210675) in 2025 and includes the text of stage play Two for the Road, also written by Wood and Wynn.

== Producer ==
As producer, he has brought the drama Blasphemy, starring Cil Stengel, to the Portland, Oregon stage and also he also co-produced two separate productions of A.R. Gurney's hit Broadway play Love Letters. Wynn also produced the world premiere of Doug Grissom's one-act drama Contact starring Ryan Case and Barry Morse. Other live events he has produced include An Evening of Song With Nichelle Nichols, The Star Trek Anniversary Celebration with Robin Curtis and Paul Carr, and Out on Broadway with Grethe Cammermeyer.

He has produced and worked on many multiple productions of the Barry Morse one-man show Merely Players throughout the U.S. and Canada, partly based on material found in the book Stories of the Theatre.

Wynn also formulated and co-produced the 60-minute audio drama Rogues and Vagabonds - A Theatrical Scrapbook. The piece is introduced by Tobias Andersen and stars Barry Morse. It featured fresh performances from the pages of theatrical history, including: The Man Who Killed Lincoln, Charles Dickens: Would-Be Actor, David Garrick: An Ideal Actor, plus performances based on works by Shakespeare (Hamlet), and George Bernard Shaw. Rogues and Vagabonds debuted on internet radio KSAV and was released on compact disk in 2013.

He produced two music albums for entertainer and actress Grace Lee Whitney: Light at the End of the Tunnel in 1996, and Yeoman Rand Sings! in 1999. These releases included a number of her classic recordings, such as Charlie X, Miri, Enemy Within, and USS Enterprise.

== Personal life ==
In 2016, Wynn married illustrator Adrian Flores in a ceremony held in Yachats, Oregon. They reside in Northern California.

== Bibliography ==
- Two for the Road (Planet Publications, 2025) ISBN 9798299210675
- The Wit and Wisdom of Barry Morse (Planet Publications, 2013), ISBN 978-1-304-26056-7
- Conversations at Warp Speed (BearManor Media, 2012), ISBN 978-1-5939-3289-3
- Valiant for Truth: Barry Morse and his Lifelong Association with Bernard Shaw (Planet Publications, 2012), ISBN 978-1-1055-9832-6
- Remember With Advantages (McFarland and Company, 2007), ISBN 978-0-7864-2771-0
- Stories of the Theatre (Lulu Press, 2006), ISBN 978-1-4116-9211-4
- The Green Carnation, Foreword by Anthony Wynn (Lulu Press, 2006), ISBN 978-1-4116-9151-3
- Pulling Faces, Making Noises (Writer's Club Press, 2004), ISBN 0-595-66485-7
- Merely Players - The Scripts (Writer's Club Press, 2003), ISBN 0-595-65673-0
