= Brauerei Gold Ochsen =

Brewery in Ulm, Germany

Brauerei Gold Ochsen GmbH
- Type: Family-owned GmbH
- Location: Ulm, Germany
- Coordinates: 48°24′25″N 9°59′27″E
- Opened: 1597
- Annual production volume: 260,000 hectolitres (220,000 US bbl) of beer, 400,000 hectolitres (340,000 US bbl) of soft drinks
- Employees: 196 in 2016
- Website: gold-ochsen.de

Brauerei Gold Ochsen GmbH is a brewery located in Ulm, Germany.

== History ==
The name Gold Ochsen is first mentioned in Ulm in 1499. In 1597, the innkeeper Gabriel Mayer founded the brewery and inn Zum Goldenen Ochsen in the historic center of Ulm. Over the following years, the firm had a number of changes in ownership.

In 1812, the brewery was purchased by brewer and guild leader Jakob Wieland. In 1867, his son sold the brewery to the Leibinger family, who retain ownership to this day. The brewery was relocated into a new building at the northern edge of the city. As a result of the Bombing of Ulm in World War II, the brewery only received light damage, although 81% of the city center was destroyed.

In 1966, the brewery received a contract to bottle products for PepsiCo, and has been offering soft drinks since then. For this purpose, a separate distribution company was established, the Ulmer Getränke Vertrieb GmbH, UGV. Gold Ochsen and its subsidiary UGV are still the largest beverage distribution companies in the Donau-Iller region.

In 1991, Ulrike Freund became the fifth generation of her family to run the brewery, replacing her father August Leibinger, the previous managing director.

Since 2012, the brewery has operated two bottling lines, that can each fill more than 40,000 bottles per hour.

In 2013, PepsiCo announced a new production partnership with Radeberger Group, ending their longstanding business relationship with Gold Ochsen, effective at the end of 2016. To replace much of this volume, Gold Ochsen has entered into a production and distribution relationship with Afri-Cola and Bluna.
