= Liberated company =

The term liberated company, popularized by the book Freedom, Inc. by Brian M. Carney and Isaac Getz, refers to an organization which, according to the authors, unleashes employees' initiative and responsibility by treating them as adults.

== Presentation ==
The notion of liberated or "freedom-form" (F-Form) company was further formalized by Isaac Getz in his 2009 academic article "Liberating Leadership: How the initiative-freeing radical organizational has been successfully adopted" in California Management Review, in which he describes it "as an organizational form that allows employees complete freedom and responsibility to take actions they decide are best". He specifies that, like architects who define human-built structures (for example a bridge) based on functions (allowing passage over an obstacle) rather than structural features, the freedom-form company is similarly defined by its function (to enable freedom and responsibility of initiative) rather than a model. According to the author, to facilitate employee freedom and responsibility, corporate liberation requires transformation—guided by the company's leader—of organizational practices that prevent them. For example, corporate liberation involves a drastic reduction of internal controls, rules, and regulations. Liberating leadership is an essential part of building liberated companies. Liberated companies are based on a business philosophy, not a model, of freedom and responsibility concepts. This is intrinsically linked to liberating leadership, a type of transformational leadership, needed to articulate this philosophy within the human context of each company to build its unique organizational form. In this sense, valuable and useful practices for one liberated company would not necessarily be suitable for another. Similar to the diversity in the organizational forms adopted by these companies, there is no standard path or method to build them. Each liberating leader co-designs, together with the employees, their unique liberation path. Further on, the liberating leader maintains and evolves this organizational form that they helped build.

== Influences and origins ==
The influences most cited by liberating leaders who have built freedom and responsibility-based organizational forms are:

- Theorists: Douglas McGregor, Stephen Covey, Abraham Maslow, Peter Senge, Jean-Christian Fauvet and Shoji Shiba;
- Author-leaders: Robert Townsend; Max De Pree and Ricardo Semler

Deployed since 1958 in many countries, it has as pioneers companies such as W. L. Gore & Associates, Avis (in the 1960s), USAA, Sun Hydraulics, Quad Graphics, Richards Group, IDEO, Chaparral Steel, Harley Davidson, and Vertex Inc. in the United States, FAVI, SEW Usocome, and Bretagne Atelier in France, SOL in Finland and Radica Games in China. These pioneers have been extremely successful both in human and economic terms for several decades and with several succeeding CEOs. Despite that, until the 2010s, the phenomenon of freedom- and responsibility-based companies remained marginal.

== Contemporary practice ==
Since the beginning of the 2010s, a growing number of companies of all sizes and sectors, such as Decathlon, Michelin, Airbus, Kiabi, and Poult have entered corporate liberation. Organizations in the non-profit sector, such as two Belgian ministries, the Social Security and a few municipalities in France, have also joined this movement. According to the Belgian business daily L'Echo, 8% of companies have entered corporate liberation. The world region with the highest absolute number of liberated companies is France and Belgium where the phenomenon is called entreprise libérée. Their number is estimated in hundreds and they have been abundantly covered in press, TV and radio, and even in a comic book.

== Comparable philosophies ==
A number of leaders have developed organizational philosophies highly compatible with liberated companies: Herb Kelleher in SouthWest Airlines, Ricardo Semler in Semco in Brazil, Vineet Nayar in HCL Technologies in India, David Marquet on a US nuclear submarine, Michel Hervé in Groupe Hervé in France, Henry Stewart in Happy Ltd. In United Kingdom, Jos de Blok in Buurtzorg Nederland, Gabe Newell in Valve, Matt Perez in Nearsoft.

== Misconceptions ==
- The "model" misconception: Liberated company, a business philosophy based on the freedom and responsibility concepts, is often presumed to be a management model. However, liberated companies have no structural elements (model) which hold across all its past, present, or future implementations.
- The "cost-cutting" misconception: Liberated companies are sometimes portrayed as a cost-cutting approach because it relies on self-directing teams and needs less managerial and control functions. Though at the beginning of the liberation the costs may go up, liberated companies do not suffer from the hidden costs of traditional companies. Lower costs—and higher profits—are not the goals but are by-products of corporate liberation (see John Kay's notion of obliquity).
- The "self-exploitation" misconception: The liberated company is sometimes portrayed as a high-pressure work environment in which employees work more, not less. It is true that based on intrinsic motivation, the liberated work-environment is characterized by high worker engagement. Some leaders in liberated companies enforce a limit on maximum working hours, but not all.
- The "Holacracy" misconception: Because liberated companies and Holacracy both criticize the traditional command-and-control model, Holacracy has been sometimes presented as a "technology" inside of liberated companies. As a consequence, some critiques of Holacracy have been directed by association at liberated companies. Unlike Holacracy, corporate liberation does not rely on any method or model; instead, each time an idiosyncratic path is used to co-invent a unique organizational form.
- The "Liberation Management" misconception: Because Tom Peters wrote a book with the title "Liberation Management", which is semantically close to the term "liberated company", it is sometimes thought that he coined "liberated company". In reality, Peters never used the term "liberated company" in this book, nor the terms "liberty" or "freedom" which are central to the definition of "liberated company". Peters has agreed with the interviewer's claim "when I read Liberation Management, the two things that come out big in that book are the use of networks and the use of knowledge management".

== Criticisms ==
Some companies, such as Avis, Harley Davidson, and Radica Games, sought to be liberated and later reverted to traditional command-and-control organizational forms. Since liberated organizational forms are maintained by company heads, if they are replaced by new ones who aren't liberating leaders, the liberated form can quickly dissolve, despite declining performance. Change of ownership can also put a limit to corporate liberation by imposing strategies incompatible with liberated companies' typical values such as trust, fairness, and respect.

== See also ==
- Benefit corporation
- Holacracy
- Sociocracy

== Bibliography ==
- Getz, Isaac (2009), "Liberating Leadership: How the Initiative-Freeing Radical Organizational Form Has Been Successfully Adopted", California Management Review, 51 (4): 32–58, doi:10.2307/41166504, JSTOR 41166504, S2CID 154761150
- Carney, Brian M. and Getz, Isaac (2016) "Freedom Inc. How Corporate Liberation unleashes employee potential and Business Performance", Somme Valley House, 2nd Edition
- Thun, Frank (2020), "Liberated Companies: How to Create Vibrant Organizations in the Digital Age", BoD.
