= Isaac Getz =

French author and conference speaker

Isaac Getz is an author, conference speaker, and currently holds the post of Professor at ESCP Business School. He specializes in the areas of organizational behavior, leadership and organizational transformation and has been instrumental for the corporate liberation movement involving hundreds of companies and institutions.

== Biography ==
In 2009, he co-published the book Freedom, Inc. with Brian M. Carney, which introduced the concept of “freedom-based company” or “liberated company”. Based on the field study of several dozen companies, such as W. L. Gore, USAA, Harley Davidson, Sun Hydraulics, Richards Group, IDEO, Chaparral Steel, FAVI, and SOL, it described the role of corporate—liberating—leaders to build organizational environment based on freedom and responsibility. The revised and expanded edition has been published in 2016. Book's editions have also appeared in Sweden, Hungary, Czech Republic, France, Netherlands, India, Israel, China, Romania, Italy, Spain, South Korea, and Japan. In France, it has won the Best Business Strategy Book award in 2013.

In 2019, he co-published the book L'entreprise altruiste with Laurent Marbacher, which introduced the concept of the “altruistic enterprise”.

In November 2025, he co-published with Laurent Marbacher The Caring Company: How to Shift Business and the Economy for Good (Wiley). Grounded in a multi-year study spanning several sectors and three continents, the book combines insights from history, economics, psychology and philosophy with contemporary cases. These companies are neither social enterprises nor nonprofit organizations, but genuine players in the market economy, some of which are large, publicly traded multinationals. Thinkers50 shortlisted this book for its Breakthrough Idea Award.

== Publications ==
- Isaac Getz (Ed.), Créativité organisationnelle, Paris, Vuibert, 2002, 160p. (ISBN 2-7117-6987-9); texts by Teresa Amabile, James Averill, Todd Lubart, Robert Sternberg, and others.
- Isaac Getz & Alan Robinson, Vos idées changent tout ! [Your ideas change everything], Paris, Éd. d'Organisation, 2003 (2nd edition, 2007), 209 p. (ISBN 2-7081-2871-X); editions in German, Dutch, Italian, and Spanish.
- Brian M. Carney & Isaac Getz, Freedom, Inc., New York, Crown Business/Random House, 2009, 304 p. (ISBN 978-2-08-138021-9) (revised and expanded edition, Argo Navis/Perseus Books, 2016), 400 p. (ISBN 978-2-08-138021-9)
- La liberté, ça marche ! [Freedom works!], Paris, Flammarion, 2016, (ISBN 978-2-0813-8021-9) (expanded edition, 2020), 374 p. (ISBN 978-0-7867-5635-3); texts by James MacGregor Burns, Robert Greenleaf, Max De Pree, Bill Gore, Bob Koski, Robert Townsend, Bob Davids, John Wooden, Robert McDermott, Ricardo Semler, and others.
- L'entreprise libérée [Liberated company], Paris, Fayard, 2017, (ISBN 978-2-213-70540-8) (expanded edition, 2019), 482p. (ISBN 978-2-818-50587-8)
- Robert Davids, Brian M. Carney & Isaac Getz, Leadership Without Ego, London, Palgrave MacMillan, 2019, 191 p. (ISBN 978-3-030-00322-7); editions in French and Spanish.
- Isaac Getz & Laurent Marbacher, L'entreprise altruiste [The altruistic enterprise], Paris, Albin Michel, 2019, 528 p. (ISBN 978-2-226-44381-6); edition in Chinese prefaced by Zhang Ruimin.
- Isaac Getz (Summer 2009), « Liberating Leadership: How the Initiative-Freeing Radical Organizational Form Has Been Successfully Adopted », California Management Review, Vol 51, N°4, pp. 32–58, on cmr.ucpress.edu (Retrieved May 10, 2017).
- Isaac Getz (March 2011), « 1960s’ Lessons Learned: Liberating Leadership and Transformational Scholarship», Journal of Management Inquiry, Vol 20, N°1, pp. 8–12, on promostudio.info (Retrieved January 2, 2018).
- Isaac Getz (2019), The transformation: How Michelin redefined the twenty-first century industrial corporation, in The Transformation Playbook: Insights, Wisdom and Best Practices to Make Transformation Reality, Wargrave, UK: Brightline/Thinkers50, pp. 74–78 (ISBN 978-1-999-31572-6), on brightline.org. Retrieved 28 August 2020.
- Isaac Getz and Laurent Marbacher (Autumn 2020), A lesson in creating successful companies that care, Strategy+Business, Issue 100, pp 28–31. Retrieved 30 August 2020.
- Isaac Getz et Laurent Marbacher, The Caring Company : How to Shift Business and the Economy for Good, New York, Wiley, 2025.
- Isaac Getz; Gilles Arnaud (25 June 2024). "The liberated company theoretical concept: current issues and the intimidating complexity of organizational design". Journal of Organization Design. 13. pp. 125–145.

== Awards and distinctions ==
- The article "Liberating Leadership: How the initiative-freeing radical organizational form has been successfully adopted", California Management Review received the Academic Award from SYNTEC Management Consulting in 2010 for the best article of a French researcher in the category “Management / Human Resources / Organization".
- The 2016 study by FNEGE (French national foundation for management education) of 1600 French managers ranked Isaac Getz as the fourth most influential living author in the world, in the field of management.
- Thinkers50 have shortlisted Isaac's work on corporate liberation for its 2019 Breakthrough Idea Award and on the caring company for its 2025 Breakthrough Idea Award.
- Marconi Institute for Creativity, part of the Fondazione Guglielmo Marconi gave Isaac Getz the 2020 Marconi Creativity Award for "his groundbreaking work on creative organizational approaches based on freedom and altruism."
