= The Golden Bowl =

1904 novel by Henry James

- First UK edition
- Author: Henry James
- Language: English
- Publisher: Scribner (US); Methuen (UK)
- Publication date: 17 November 1904
- Publication place: United States
- Media type: Print (hardback and paperback)
- Pages: Vol. 1, 412 pp; Vol. 2, 377pp (US)
- ISBN: 978-1514729427

The Golden Bowl is a 1904 novel by Henry James. Set in England, this complex, intense study of marriage and adultery completes what some critics have called the "major phase" of James's career. The Golden Bowl explores the inextricably woven and intertwined web of interrelationships between a father, Adam Verver, his daughter, Maggie Verver, and their respective spouses, Adam's young wife Charlotte Stant, and Maggie's husband Prince Amerigo. The novel focuses deeply and almost exclusively on the consciousness of the central characters, with sometimes obsessive detail but also with powerful insight.

== Synopsis ==
Prince Amerigo, an impoverished but charismatic Italian nobleman, is in London for his marriage to Maggie Verver, only child of the widower Adam Verver, a fabulously wealthy American financier and art collector. While there, he re-encounters Charlotte Stant, another young American and a former mistress from his days in Rome; they had met in Mrs. Assingham's drawing room. Charlotte is not wealthy, which is one reason they did not marry. Although Maggie and Charlotte have been dear friends since childhood, Maggie does not know of Charlotte's and Amerigo's past relationship. Charlotte and Amerigo go shopping together for a wedding present for Maggie. They find a shop where the shopkeeper offers them an antique gilded crystal bowl. Charlotte lacks the money to buy the bowl and the Prince declines to purchase it, as he suspects it contains a hidden flaw (The flaw of the bowl is a nearly invisible crack).

After Maggie has married, she worries that her widowed her father has become lonely, as the two had been close for years since her mother's death. She persuades him to propose marriage to Charlotte, who accepts.

Soon after that wedding, Charlotte and Amerigo are thrown together, because their respective spouses seem more interested in their father-daughter relationship than in their marriages. Amerigo and Charlotte kiss and later spend a day together visiting a cathedral and an inn. Whether or not they have sex remains ambiguous.

Maggie begins to suspect the pair. She happens to go to the same shop and buys the golden bowl they had rejected. Regretting the high price he has charged her, the shopkeeper visits Maggie and confesses to overcharging. At her home, he sees photographs of Amerigo and Charlotte. He tells Maggie of the pair's shopping trip on the eve of her marriage and their intimate conversation in his shop. (They had spoken Italian, but he understands the language.)

Maggie confronts Amerigo. She begins a secret campaign to separate him and Charlotte, while never revealing their affair to her father. Concealing her knowledge from Charlotte and denying any change to their friendship, she gradually persuades her father to return to America with his wife.

After previously regarding Maggie as a naïve, immature American, the Prince seems impressed by his wife's delicate diplomacy. The novel ends with Adam and Charlotte Verver about to depart for the United States. Amerigo says he can "see nothing but" Maggie and embraces her.

== Main characters ==
- Maggie Verver
- Prince Amerigo
- Charlotte Stant
- Adam Verver
- Mrs Frances "Fanny" Assingham
- Colonel Robert Assingham

== Literary significance and criticism ==
The Golden Bowl's intense focus on its four main characters gives the novel both its tremendous power and its peculiar feeling of claustrophobia. Henry James himself had a high regard for his last work, describing it to his American publisher as "distinctly the most done of my productions ― the most composed and constructed and completed...I hold the thing the solidest, as yet, of all my fictions."

Created during what critics classify as James's third phase of writing, The Golden Bowl showcases the dense prose (often called James's "late style") that characterises his final novels. Although the narrative is very focused compared to his earlier works, with a limited number of characters, the writing is complex and elaborate. Writer Gore Vidal attributed this verbosity in part to James's habit at the time of dictating his novels to stenographers rather than typing the manuscript himself. Vidal thought the style of The Golden Bowl, as well as The Wings of the Dove (1902) and The Ambassadors (1903), mimicked James's own rhetorical manner, which was "endlessly complex, humorous, unexpected - euphemistic where most people are direct and suddenly precise where avoidance or ellipsis is usual..."

Robert McCrum included the novel in The Guardian's list of 100 Best Novels, describing it as an "amazing, labyrinthine, terrifying and often claustrophobic narrative." Author Colm Toibin called The Golden Bowl Henry James's best work, in part because James "stripped down" the number of characters to four. He describes James's style of expressing consciousness as "a system of clauses, sub-clauses, modifications, qualifications and in some cases ruminations", which anticipates the later styles of stream of consciousness writing by James Joyce and Virginia Woolf. Writer John Banville also compared James's modernist stream of consciousness technique, which characterises The Golden Bowl, to that of James Joyce, summarising it as "a style designed to catch, with immense, with fiendish, subtlety, and in sentences of labyrinthine intricacy, the very texture of conscious life."

The author Rebecca West, on the other hand, said of it that "winter had fallen on [James'] genius in The Golden Bowl." Critics have noted the overbearing symbolism of the golden bowl, which is eventually broken in a scene that may not be fully effective.

In 1998, the Modern Library ranked The Golden Bowl 32nd on its list of the 100 best English-language novels of the 20th century.

Some critics believe that The Golden Bowl was an inspiration for Iris Murdoch, a known fan of James. They suggest it particularly influenced her novel A Severed Head.

The title is taken from Ecclesiastes 12: "Or ever the silver cord be loosed, or the golden bowl be broken, or the pitcher be broken at the fountain, or the wheel broken at the cistern. Then shall the dust return to the earth as it was: and the spirit shall return unto God who gave it. Vanity of vanities, saith the preacher; all is vanity."

== Adaptations ==
=== Television and film ===
In 1972, the BBC produced a six-hour televised series that was highly praised, with a screenplay by Jack Pulman. Gayle Hunnicutt played Charlotte, Barry Morse was Adam Verver, Jill Townsend was Maggie Verver, Daniel Massey played the Prince, and Cyril Cusack was Bob Assingham. He was ingeniously presented as the narrator, commenting on the development of the story very much in the style of Henry James. This version, presented on Masterpiece Theatre on PBS in the United States, was more faithful to the book than the Merchant-Ivory film produced nearly 30 years later in the U.S.

In 2000, The Golden Bowl was filmed by Merchant Ivory Productions, directed by James Ivory. It starred Uma Thurman, Nick Nolte, Kate Beckinsale and Jeremy Northam.

In some ways Ruth Prawer Jhabvala's adaptation differs from James's novel. In the book, Charlotte is a calculating, amoral character who manipulates and manages those around her with a glance or a smile; however, in the movie, Charlotte appears to suffer from some mental disorder, exhibiting symptoms of paranoia and obsessive love.

=== Radio ===
In 1956, the BBC broadcast a radio adaptation in two parts, adapted from the novel by Mary Allen Hope.

== Critical editions ==
- Henry James, The Golden Bowl (Wordsworth Classics, 2000), ed. Nicola Bradbury, ISBN 978-1840224320

== Bibliography ==
- The Novels of Henry James by Edward Wagenknecht (New York: Frederick Ungar Publishing Co., 1983) ISBN 0-8044-2959-6
- The Novels of Henry James by Oscar Cargill (New York: Macmillan Co., 1961)
- Gibson, Suzie. "Love's Negative Dialectic in Henry James's 'The Golden Bowl'", Philosophy and Literature, 39.1, 1–14, 2015.
