= Seven Day Weekend =

Seven Day Weekend may refer to:

- Seven Day Weekend (album), a 1992 album by the New York Dolls
- 7 Day Weekend (album), a 1985 album by The Comsat Angels
- "7 Day Weekend" (song), a 1992 song by Grace Jones
- "Seven Day Weekend", a song by Gary U.S. Bonds
- "Seven-Day Weekend", a song by Elvis Costello and the Attractions for the movie Club Paradise
- "Seven Day Weekend", a 2012 song by J. T. Harding
- The Seven-Day Weekend, a 2003 book by Ricardo Semler
