= Brian Carney =

Brian Carney may refer to:

- Brian Carney (cricketer) (born 1931), Australian cricketer
- Brian Carney (editorialist), American journalist
- Brian Carney (rugby) (born 1976), Irish rugby league and rugby union footballer
