= Gayle Hunnicutt =

American actress (1943–2023)

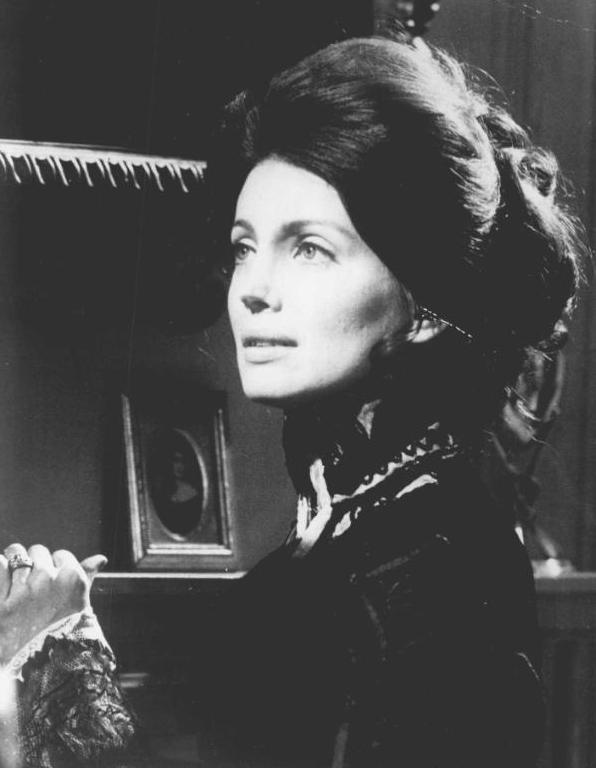
- Hunnicutt in The Golden Bowl (1972)
- Born: February 6, 1943; Fort Worth, Texas, U.S.
- Died: August 31, 2023 (aged 80); London, England
- Education: Texas Christian University; University of California, Los Angeles
- Occupations: Actress, writer, model
- Years active: 1966–1999
- Known for: Marlowe; The Legend of Hell House
- Spouses: David Hemmings (m. 1968; div. 1975) Sir Simon Jenkins (m. 1978; div. 2009)
- Children: 2, including Nolan Hemmings

Gayle Hunnicutt, Lady Jenkins (February 6, 1943 – August 31, 2023) was an American film, television, and stage actress. She is known for her roles in both American and British films, and co-productions: Marlowe (1969), Fragment of Fear (1970), Running Scared (1972), and The Legend of Hell House (1973). She also portrayed Vanessa Beaumont on the popular soap opera Dallas (1988–1991).

== Early life and education ==
Hunnicutt was born February 6, 1943 in Fort Worth, Texas, the daughter of Mary Virginia (née Dickerson) and Colonel Sam Lloyd Hunnicutt. Hunnicutt attended Texas Christian University before winning a scholarship to the University of California, Los Angeles, where she majored in English literature and theatre.

She worked as a fashion model, then became an actress.

== Career ==
=== Acting ===
During her early film career, Hunnicutt was typecast as a red-haired sexpot. She portrayed Emaline Fetty, a con woman trying to extort money from the Clampetts in two episodes of The Beverly Hillbillies in 1966. Her film debut was a small role was in the motorcycle film The Wild Angels (1966), which starred Peter Fonda. Bruce Dern, and Diane Ladd. She co-starred with George Peppard in the detective film P.J. (1968) and with James Garner in the detective film Marlowe (1969), in which her character was a glamorous Hollywood actress.

She moved to England with husband David Hemmings in 1970. She and Hemmings co-starred in two horror films in the early 1970s, Fragment of Fear (1970) and Voices (1973). She played Charlotte Stant in the Jack Pulman BBC television adaptation (1972) of Henry James's The Golden Bowl. She played Ann Barrett in The Legend of Hell House (1973), and Tsarina Alexandra in the British television miniseries Fall of Eagles (1974). She played a supporting role in the horror film The Spiral Staircase in 1975, which starred Jacqueline Bisset. She appeared as a housewife and mother in an episode of The Martian Chronicles in 1979.

She appeared as Irene Adler, opposite Jeremy Brett, in the first episode of the TV series The Adventures of Sherlock Holmes ("A Scandal in Bohemia") in 1984. She also appeared in another Marlowe mystery in an episode of HBO's Philip Marlowe, Private Eye (1983), this time starring Powers Boothe. She had a supporting role in the thriller Target (1985), co-starring Gene Hackman and Matt Dillon, and another supporting role in the horror film Dream Lover (1986). Hunnicutt returned to the United States in 1989 to play the role of Vanessa Beaumont in Dallas, making semi-regular appearances until 1991.

In 2012, Hunnicutt was featured in an episode of the HGTV reality show Selling London, in which she presented the Primrose Hill property where she and her second husband, journalist and editor Simon Jenkins, lived for three decades.

=== Writing ===
Hunnicutt wrote two books. The first, Health and Beauty in Motherhood, was published in 1984. In 2004, she published Dearest Virginia: Love Letters from a Cavalry Officer in the South Pacific, which contains the letters exchanged by her parents during World War II.

== Personal life and death ==
On November 16, 1968, Hunnicutt married British actor David Hemmings. The couple had a son, actor Nolan Hemmings, before divorcing in 1975 due to his affair with Samantha Eggar.

Hunnicutt married British journalist Simon Jenkins in 1978. The couple lived in Primrose Hill, London, where they raised their son Edward. Jenkins was appointed a Knight Bachelor for services to journalism in the 2004 New Year honours. They divorced in 2009. In 2010 she started dating Richard Evans, tennis correspondent of The Daily Telegraph.

Hunnicutt died in London on August 31, 2023, at the age of 80.

== Filmography ==
=== Film ===
Year	Title	Role	Notes	Ref.
1966	The Wild Angels	Suzie		
1968	P.J.	Maureen Preble		
1968	The Smugglers	Adrianna	Television film	
1969	Eye of the Cat	Kassia Lancaster		
1969	Marlowe	Mavis Wald		
1970	Fragment of Fear	Juliet Bristow		
1971	Freelance	Chris		
1971	The Love Machine	Astrological girl at party	Uncredited	
1972	Running Scared	Ellen Case		
1973	Voices	Claire		
1973	Scorpio	Susan		
1973	The Legend of Hell House	Ann Barrett		
1974	Nuits rouges		Alternate title: Shadowman	
1975	The Spiral Staircase	Blanche		
1976	Strange Shadows in an Empty Room	Margie Cohn		
1976	The Sell Out	Deborah		
1978	Once in Paris...	Susan Townsend		
1978	Dylan	Liz Reitel	Television film	
1979	The Saint and the Brave Goose	Annabelle West		
1980	Flashpoint Africa	Lisa Ford		
1981	The Million Dollar Face	Diana Masterson	Television film	
1983	Return of the Man from U.N.C.L.E.	Andrea Mackovich	Television film	
1983	Savage in the Orient	Julian Clydesdale	Television film	
1984	Two by Forsyth		Television film	
1985	Target	Donna Lloyd		
1986	Dream Lover	Claire		
1986	Strong Medicine	Lillian Hawthorne	Television film	
1987	Turnaround	Pat		
1989	Silence Like Glass	Mrs. Martin		
1989	Hard to Be a God			
1989	The Saint: The Brazilian Connection	Mrs. Cunningham	Television film	

=== Television ===
Year	Title	Role	Notes	Ref.
1966	The Beverly Hillbillies	Emaline Fetty	2 episodes	
1966	Love on a Rooftop	Barbara Ames	Episode: "There's Got to Be Something Wrong With Her"	
1966	Hey, Landlord	Joan	Episode: "Safari"	
1966–1967	Get Smart: It Takes One to Know One	Octavia, a KAOS agent		
1972	The Golden Bowl	Charlotte Slant	Miniseries	
1973	Away from it all	Madame Dalleray	Episode:The Ripening Seed	
1974	Fall of Eagles	Tsarina Alexandra	Miniseries	
1974	Thriller	Suzy Buckley	Episode: "K Is for Killing"	
1979	Return of the Saint	Annabelle West	2 episodes	
1979	A Man Called Intrepid	Cynthia	Miniseries	
1980	Fantômas	Lady Beltham	Miniseries	
1980	The Martian Chronicles	Ruth Wilder	Miniseries	
1980	The Love Boat	Janet Mallory	3 episodes	
1981	Lady Killers	Edith Thompson	Episode: "The Darlingest Boy"	
1983	Taxi	Mrs. Bascome	Episode: "Louie Moves Uptown"	
1983	Tales of the Unexpected	Susan Mandeville	Episode: "The Luncheon"	
1984	The Adventures of Sherlock Holmes	Irene Adler	Episode: "A Scandal in Bohemia"	
1984	The First Olympics: Athens 1896	Mary Sloane	Miniseries	
1985	A Woman of Substance	Olivia Wainright	Miniseries	
1986	Dream West	Maria Crittenden	Miniseries	
1989–1991	Dallas	Vanessa Beaumont	13 episodes	
1996	Tales from the Crypt	Ellen	Episode: "Smoke Wrings"	
