= Ray Anthony =

American bandleader and trumpeter (born 1922)

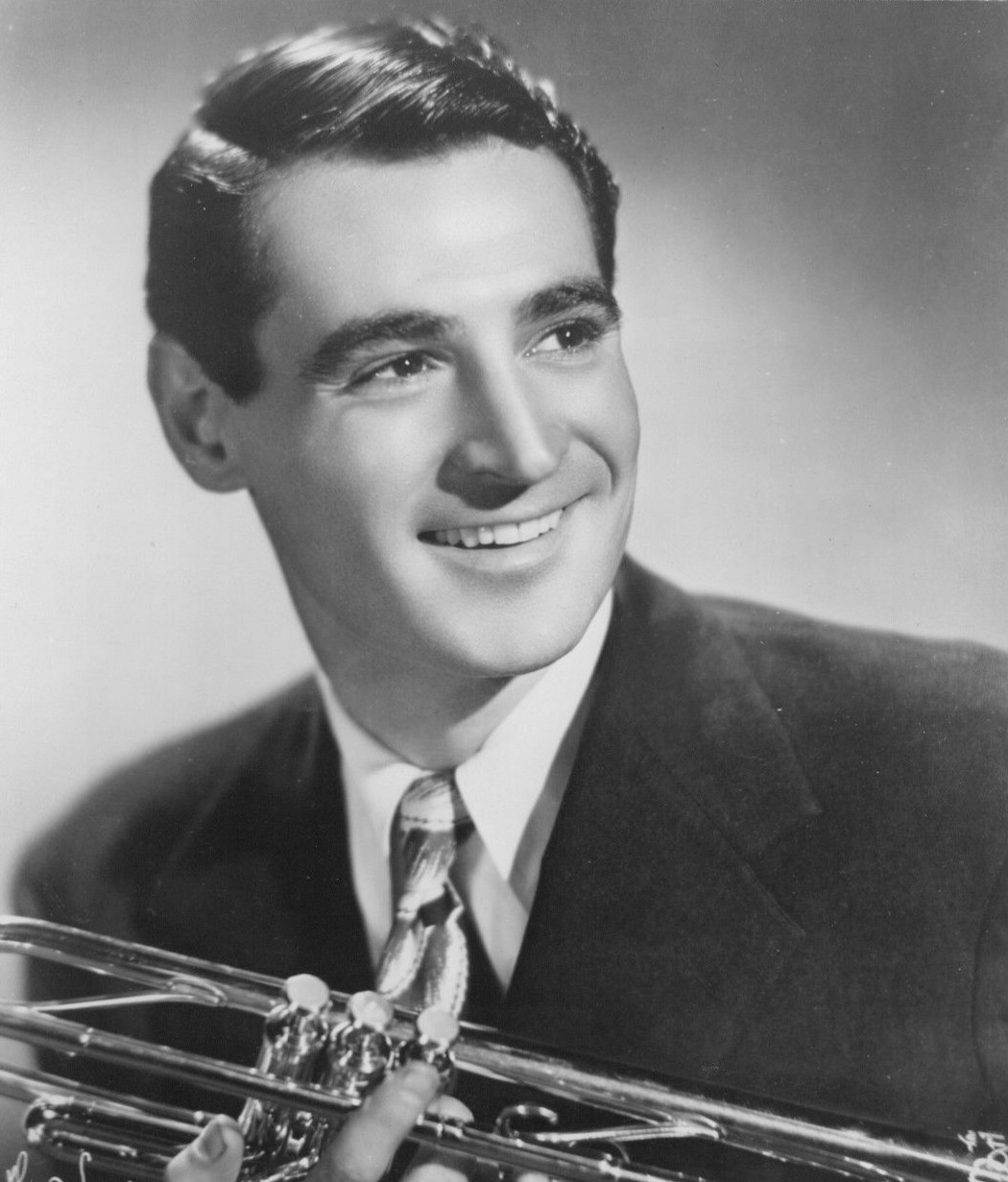
- Anthony in 1950

Background information
- Born: Raymond Antonini; January 20, 1922 (age 104); Bentleyville, Pennsylvania, U.S.
- Genres: Big band, jazz, swing
- Occupations: Musician, bandleader
- Instrument: Trumpet
- Years active: 1936–1998
- Labels: Aero Space, Capitol
- Spouse: Mamie Van Doren (m. 1955; div. 1961)

Ray Anthony (born Raymond Antonini; January 20, 1922) is an American retired bandleader, trumpeter, songwriter and actor. He is best known for his tenure as a member of the Glenn Miller Orchestra, from 1940 to 1941, and later for successfully leading his own big band. He is currently the oldest recorded living musician.

After returning to professional music in 1945 following a stint in the United States Navy, he formed his own orchestra, and penned numerous successful compositions, some of which became chart successes, including "The Bunny Hop", "Thunderbird", "Houseparty Hop", "Trumpet Boogie", "Dream Dancing", "Dream While You Dance", "Dance My Heart", "Let's All Do the Swim", "Big Band Boogie", and "Mr. Anthony's Boogie". He also had a limited professional acting career and frequently appeared in the tabloids during his brief marriage to actress Mamie Van Doren.

Anthony continued to tour around the United States in big bands before retiring in 1998. At the age of 104, he is the last living member of the Glenn Miller Orchestra.

== Early life ==
Anthony was born to an Italian family in Bentleyville, Pennsylvania, but moved with his family to Cleveland, Ohio, where he studied the trumpet after his father gave him a trumpet on his fifth birthday. As a teenager he was influenced by Harry James, later saying of him: "In my opinion, I think Harry James was the greatest trumpet. He had a complete mastery of the instrument and a conception I admired".

Anthony played in his family group, The Antonini Family Orchestra.

== Career ==
=== Music ===
Anthony made his professional debut in 1940, backing Al Donahue.

Anthony joined the Glenn Miller Orchestra as an eighteen year-old in 1940, replacing Phil Rommel. Anthony was in the band from 1940 to 1941. He had seen the band live three months before he joined them. He recalled being teased by the other members for being the youngest member: "He (Glenn Miller) was tough but it’s a business. You don’t have much time to do anything but follow the lines". Reportedly, Anthony was constantly fired by Miller due to him repeatedly suggesting new ideas for the band, but was always rehired again as his "skills were so high"; this led to him being nicknamed "Peck's Bad Boy". Ray appeared uncredited in the Glenn Miller movie Sun Valley Serenade.

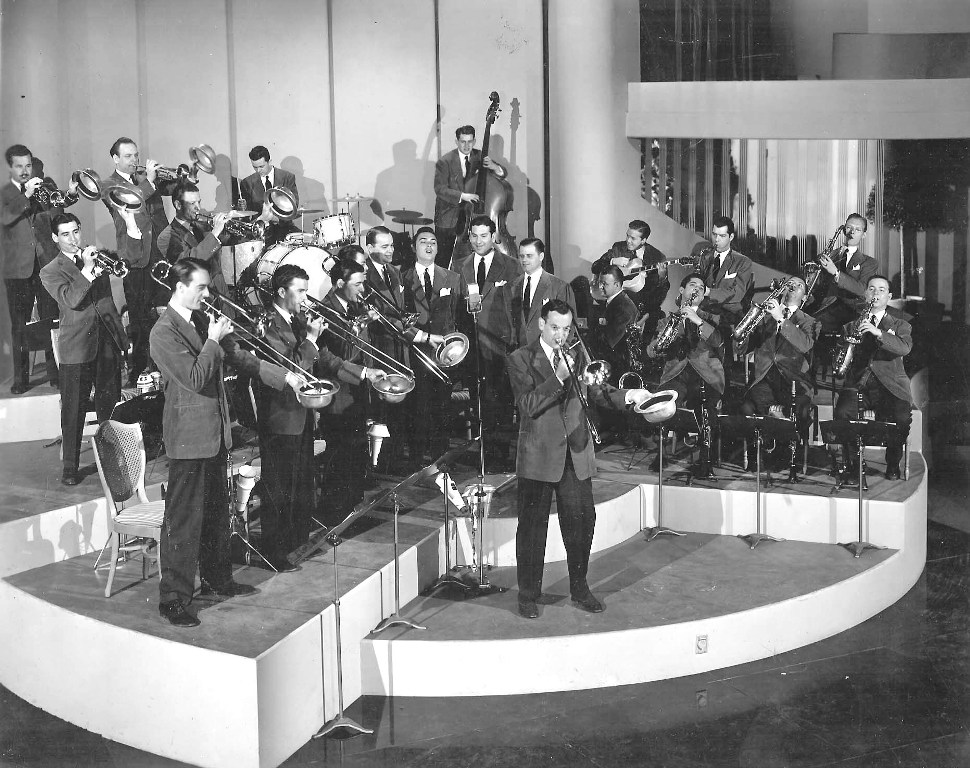
Anthony (far left on the second row) performing on stage with the Glenn Miller Orchestra, 1940—1941

Anthony lasted less than a year in the group, leaving without return in 1941 after six months over not getting along with Miller. He then briefly played with Jimmy Dorsey before he joined the U.S. Navy in 1942 during World War II (with Miller joining the Army and organizing his famous military band before his plane's 1944 disappearance over the English Channel.) While in the Navy, Anthony entertained troops in the Royal Hawaiian Hotel.

After the war, he remained in the Navy for one more year, and upon being discharged formed his own group, The Ray Anthony Orchestra, which became popular in the early 1950s with "The Bunny Hop" (#13 on Billboard, #34 on Cash Box), "Hokey Pokey", and the memorable theme from the radio/television police detective series Dragnet, which reached no. 2 on Billboard and no. 7 in the UK. He had a No. 2 chart hit on Billboard with a recording of the tune "At Last" in 1952, which also reached no. 20 on Cash Box; it was the highest charting pop version of the song in the U.S. His 1962 recording "Worried Mind" received considerable radio airplay, reaching no. 20 on the Billboard Adult Contemporary chart.

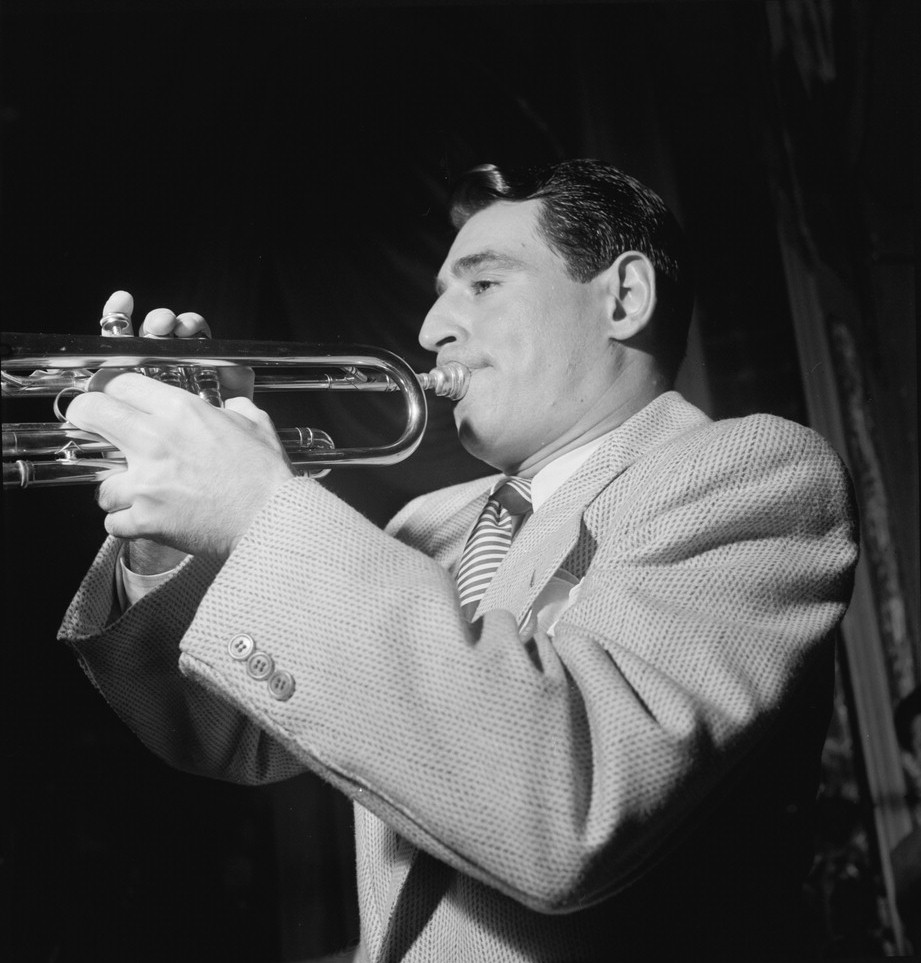
Anthony performing in 1947

In 1953, Anthony and his orchestra were featured when Helen O'Connell and Bob Eberly headlined a summer replacement program for Perry Como's CBS television show.

From 1953 to 1954, Anthony was musical director of the television series TV's Top Tunes. In 1957, Anthony and his orchestra recorded the music score for the film This Could Be The Night, with vocals performed by Julie Wilson.

He continued his musical career and had another hit record with the jazzy drumming theme from the Peter Gunn private detective series featuring Craig Stevens, which reached No. 8 on the Billboard Hot 100 pop chart with its popularity enduring for decades. Among the Anthony band's pianists was Allen "Puddler" Harris, a native of Franklin Parish, in Louisiana, who had been a member of the original rock singer Ricky Nelson's band, and Kellie Greene, who also played the vibraphone.

In the early 1980s, Anthony formed Big Band '80s, with other members of the band including Buddy Rich, Harry James, Les Brown, and Alvino Rey. His later works tended to break away from the big-band jazz style, ranging from MOR and lounge music to blues, film and television themes.Anthony also made tv appearances and recordings as a vocalist.

=== Acting ===
Anthony began his acting in the mid 1950s, and trained with the likes of Estelle Harman and Sanford Meisner.

Anthony appeared as himself with his orchestra in the 1955 film Daddy Long Legs starring Fred Astaire and Leslie Caron. Anthony began expanding his acting career. Anthony and his band appeared in the movie The Girl Can't Help It (1956). In 1956–57, he starred in a short-lived television variety show, The Ray Anthony Show. He appeared in several films during the late 1950s, including The Five Pennies (in which he portrayed Jimmy Dorsey), and alongside Mamie Van Doren in High School Confidential! (1958) (as "Bix"), The Beat Generation and Girls Town (both 1959). During the 1959–60 television season, he guest-starred in the episode "Operation Ramrod" of star David Hedison's espionage series Five Fingers on NBC.

== Personal life ==
Anthony married singer Dee Keating (1920–1965). Anthony and Keating had met while both were working with Al Donahue. Dee also sang for Anthony in his own big band.

On August 29, 1955, he married sexpot actress Mamie Van Doren in Toledo, Ohio. Their son Perry Ray was born on March 18, 1956. After Van Doren filed for divorce in 1958, citing "cruelty" and long absences, they divorced in 1961, with Van Doren being granted custody.

As of 2022 he was still living in Hollywood, in the same house since 1975. Anthony has reported to have suffered from hearing loss in recent years, with his hearing described as having "diminished considerably".

A house Anthony bought in the Sherman Oaks neighborhood of Los Angeles in 1952 and lived in for a few years was listed in 2018 for $4.5 million.

Anthony became the last living member of Glenn Miller's band when bassist Trigger Alpert died in 2013, though Nat Peck, from Miller's latter-era Air Force group, lived until 2015. He turned 100 on January 20, 2022.

== Legacy ==
Anthony was considered one of the most modern big band leaders.

In the lyrics to "Opus One", which imagine a number of players all performing the song, he is cited along with Les Brown and his Band of Renown:

If Mr. Les Brown can make it renown.
And Ray Anthony could swing it for me.

Anthony has been honored with a star on the Hollywood Walk of Fame.

== Discography ==
Year	Album	Label	Peak chart positions		Catalog Number
Year	Album	Label	Billboard 200	Cash Box	Catalog Number
1950	Dance Time (split album with Jan Garber [one side by each])	Capitol	—	—	H-199
1951	Arthur Murray Favorites: Fox Trots	Capitol	—	—	H-258
1952	Houseparty Hop	Capitol	10	—	H-292
1952	Campus Rumpus!	Capitol	—	—	H-362
1953	The Young Man With The Horn	Capitol	—	—	H-373
1953	The Anthony Choir	Capitol	—	—	H-442
1954	I Remember Glenn Miller	Capitol	6	—	H-476
1954	Ray Anthony Plays TV's Top Tunes	Capitol	—	—	H-9118
1954	Arthur Murray Swing Fox Trots	Capitol	—	—	H-546
1955	Golden Horn	Capitol	10	—	T-563
1955	Swingin' On Campus!	Capitol	—	—	T-645
1955	Standards By Ray Anthony	Capitol	—	—	T-663
1955	Big Band Dixieland	Capitol	—	—	T-678
1956	Dream Dancing	Capitol	15	21	T-723
1956	Jam Session at the Tower	Capitol	—	—	T-749
1957	Dancers in Love	Capitol	—	—	T-786
1957	Star Dancing	Capitol	—	—	T-831
1957	Young Ideas	Capitol	—	—	T-866
1957	This Could Be The Night	MGM	—	—	E3530 ST
1958	Moments Together	Capitol	—	—	T-917
1958	The Dream Girl	Capitol	—	—	T-969
1958	Dancing Over the Waves	Capitol	—	—	T-1028
1958	Anthony Plays Steve Allen	Capitol	—	—	T-1086
1959	Anthony Italiano	Capitol	—	—	ST-1149
1959	Sounds Spectacular	Capitol	—	—	ST-1200
1959	More Dream Dancing	Capitol	—	—	ST-1252
1960	Like Wild!	Capitol	—	—	ST-1304
1960	Dancing Alone Together: Torch Songs For Lovers	Capitol	—	—	ST-1420
1960	The New Ray Anthony Show	Capitol	—	—	ST-1421
1961	That's Show Biz	Capitol	—	—	ST-1496
1961	Swing-Dance-Dream to 'The Unsinkable Molly Brown'	Capitol	—	—	ST-1576
1961	Dream Dancing Medley	Capitol	—	—	ST-1608
1961	The Twist	Capitol	—	—	ST-1668
1962	Worried Mind: The Soul Of Country Western Blues	Capitol	14	15	ST-1752
1962	I Almost Lost My Mind: The Soul Of Big City Rhythm & Blues	Capitol	—	—	ST-1783
1964	Smash Hits of '63!	Capitol	—	—	ST-1917
1964	Charade and Other Top Themes	Capitol	—	—	ST-2043
1964	My Love, Forgive Me (Amore Scusami)	Capitol	—	—	ST-2150
1964	Swim, Swim, C'mon and Swim	Capitol	—	—	ST-2188
1966	Dream Dancing Today	Capitol	—	—	ST-2457
1966	Hit Songs to Remember	Capitol	—	93	ST-2530
1966	To Each His Own	Sears	—	—	SP-429
1967	Today's Trumpet	Capitol	—	—	ST-2750
1968	Ray Anthony Now	Ranwood	—	—	RLP-8033
1969	Lo Mucho Que Te Quiero (The More I Love You)	Ranwood	—	—	RLP-8046
1969	Love Is For The Two Of Us [AKA Great Country Music Hits]	Ranwood	—	—	RLP-8059
1970	I Get The Blues When It Rains [reissue of Ray Anthony Now]	Ranwood	—	—	RLP-8062
1971	Direction '71: My Sweet Lord	Ranwood	—	—	RLP-8078
1971	Dream Dancing in Hawaii	Aero Space	—	—	RA-1004
1972	Dream Dancing Around The World	Aero Space	—	—	SR 1007
1975	A Little Bit Country	Capitol	—	—	SM-11411
1976	Great Golden Hits	Ranwood	—	—	R-8153
1978	Touch Dancing	Aero Space	—	—	RA-1008
1978	Swing Goes On Vol. 10	Capitol	—	—	1 C 054-52 719
1978	Dance Along	Sunnyvale	—	—	SVL-1018
1980	Big Band Series/Original Recording	Picc-a-dilly	—	—	PIC-3422
1981	Volume II-Big Band Series	Picc-a-dilly	—	—	PIC-3545
1987	Best 20	Capitol	—	—	CP32-5391
1988	A Música De Glenn Miller	Capitol	—	—	054 791016
1988	1988 & All That Jazz	Aero Space	—	—	RACD-1030
1989	Ray Anthony	Capitol	—	—	CP28-5908
1993	In The Miller Mood Vol. II	Aero Space	—	—	RACD-1037
