= The Golden Bowl (TV series) =

1972 British TV drama series

- Genre: Drama
- Based on: The Golden Bowl by Henry James
- Written by: Jack Pulman
- Directed by: James Cellan Jones
- Starring: Barry Morse; Jill Townsend; Daniel Massey; Gayle Hunnicutt
- Country of origin: United Kingdom
- Original language: English
- No. of series: 1
- No. of episodes: 6

Production
- Producer: Martin Lisemore
- Running time: 50 minutes
- Production company: BBC

Original release
- Network: BBC Two
- Release: 4 May – 8 June 1972

The Golden Bowl is a 1972 British television series, which originally aired on BBC 2 in six episodes. It is an adaptation of the 1904 novel The Golden Bowl by Henry James. It was also aired in the United States in 1973 on PBS, featured on Masterpiece Theatre.

== Cast ==
- Barry Morse as Adam Verver
- Jill Townsend as Maggie Verver
- Daniel Massey as Prince Amerigo
- Gayle Hunnicutt as Charlotte Stant
- Cyril Cusack as Bob Assingham
- Kathleen Byron as Fanny Assingham
- Carl Bernard as Shopkeeper
- Anna Fox as Lady Castledean
- Angus MacKay as Lord Castledean
- Hilary Minster as Guest
- Donald Gray as Sir John Brinder
- Andrea Addison as Guest
- Sarah Brackett as Mrs. Rance
- Elizabeth Chambers as Margaret
- Deborah Davies as Guest
- Mischa De La Motte as Harold
- Freddie Earlle as Calderoni
- Billy Franks as Page
- Henry Goodman as Secretary
- Terry Mitchell as Mr. Blint
- Jonathan Scott as Harper
- Marguerite Young as Mrs. Noble

== Bibliography ==
- Baskin, Ellen. Serials on British Television, 1950-1994. Scolar Press, 1996.
