= Poldark (1975 TV series) =

1970s TV series

- Title card
- Genre: Drama
- Written by: Paul Wheeler; Jack Russell; Jack Pulman; Alexander Baron; John Wiles
- Directed by: Christopher Barry; Paul Annett; Kenneth Ives; Philip Dudley; Roger Jenkins
- Starring: Robin Ellis; Angharad Rees; Jill Townsend; Paul Curran; Ralph Bates; Mary Wimbush; Judy Geeson
- Country of origin: United Kingdom
- Original language: English
- No. of series: 2
- No. of episodes: 29

Production
- Producers: Morris Barry; Anthony Coburn
- Production locations: England, UK
- Running time: 50 minutes

Original release
- Network: BBC1
- Release: 5 October 1975 – 4 December 1977

Poldark is the original version of the BBC television series adaptation of the novels of the same title written by Winston Graham. The adaptation was first broadcast in the UK between 1975 and 1977. The production covered all seven novels (of the eventual twelve) that Graham had written up to this time.

== Outline ==
The romantic saga follows Ross Poldark as he loses his fiancée, the well-bred beauty Elizabeth Chynoweth, to his cousin Francis Poldark. Ross ends up marrying his servant, Demelza Carne, but his passion for Elizabeth simmers for years.

Set in late 18th century Cornwall, the plot follows Poldark's attempts to make his derelict copper mines a success. Life is hard, smuggling is rife, and Poldark finds himself taking the side of the underclass against the ruthless behaviour of his enemies, the greedy Warleggan clan, including George Warleggan.

Although the emphasis is primarily on Poldark and Demelza, there are many other characters with their own stories. The first series includes Dr Dwight Enys, a forward-thinking young man who prefers to serve poor local communities rather than the rich. Enys has a brief affair with a married actress, Keren Daniel; her outraged husband murders her. By the end of the first series, Enys has become involved with heiress Caroline Penvenen. In the second series, they marry, following Poldark's rescue of Enys from a French prison.

The second series features Geoffrey Charles Poldark, the son of Elizabeth and Francis Poldark. Francis drowns in a subterranean lake while investigating a putative new lode of copper in a mine in which he is invested with Ross.

The widowed Elizabeth eventually marries Ross's great enemy George Warleggan. Geoffrey Charles resembles his father, and at times comes into conflict with his new stepfather George Warleggan. But Warleggan shows him certain kindnesses and pays for his education.

Geoffrey Charles begins a friendship with Demelza's brother Drake Carne, whom he and his governess Morwenna, Elizabeth's cousin, first meet in the woods on the Warleggan estate. Geoffrey Charles plays an instrumental role in the later development of Drake and Morwenna's romance.

Drake is Ross Poldark's brother-in-law and has a working-class background; therefore Warleggan considers him an unsuitable marriage partner for Morwenna. Warleggan arranges a marriage between Morwenna and Reverend Osborne Whitworth, whom she despises. Pining for Morwenna, Drake puts his energies into building his blacksmith business and helping his brother Sam, a devout Methodist.

Morwenna and Osborne have a son, John Conan, but she cannot bring herself to love the child because of despising his father. Eventually Morwenna tells Osborne she will kill his son if he forces his attentions on her one more time.

Osborne has an affair with Morwenna's younger sister Rowella. Rowella's husband, Arthur Solway, discovers his wife's adultery and attacks Osborne. The minister falls partially from his saddle and is dragged to death by his frightened horse. Despite having had such a bad marriage with Osborne, the widow Morwenna eventually marries Drake.

Sam Carne becomes enamoured of Emma Tregirls, who refuses to marry him because she knows that his Methodist congregation will never approve of her. She loves Sam, but knows that her lack of religion and her bad reputation will eventually cause conflict between him and his faith.

The emphasis remains with Ross and Demelza.The series concludes with the death of Elizabeth Warleggan after the birth of her and George's daughter Ursula. Elizabeth had taken a potion to bring on labour early so Warleggan would think that she habitually delivered her children a few weeks prematurely.

Elizabeth had delivered her first child, Valentine, eight months after her wedding to George. She had supposedly had an accidental fall on the stairs. It is suggested that the fall resulted from her having felt the labour coming on. Valentine is actually Ross's son, conceived a month before Elizabeth and George married. George is long deceived as to Valentine's parentage.

Agatha Poldark and Prudie Paynter, Ross and Demelza's housekeeper, both realized that Valentine was Ross's son. Agatha tells Warleggan of her conclusion; he assaults her because of his anger over her revelation, and she dies.

Elizabeth dies after the birth of Ursula because of developing gangrene from the potion she had taken. When the doctor asked her if she had taken anything to bring on labour, she had denied it because Warleggan was sitting beside her. He later revealed his knowledge of what Elizabeth had done when he said to Ross, "See what you and I have brought her to."

== Cast ==
- Captain Ross Vennor Poldark (Robin Ellis)
- Elizabeth Warleggan (formerly Poldark, née Chynoweth) (Jill Townsend)
- Francis Poldark (Clive Francis)
- Demelza Poldark (née Carne) (Angharad Rees)
- Charles Poldark (Frank Middlemass)
- George Warleggan (Ralph Bates)
- Verity Blamey (née Poldark) (Norma Streader)
- Dr Dwight Enys (Richard Morant - first series, Michael Cadman - second series)
- Keren Daniel (Sheila White)
- Caroline Penvenen (Judy Geeson)
- Geoffrey Charles Poldark (Stefan Gates)
- Drake Carne (Kevin McNally)
- Morwenna Carne (previously Whitworth, née Chynoweth) (Jane Wymark)
- Reverend Osborne Whitworth (Christopher Biggins)
- Sam (David Delve)
- Rowella (Julie Dawn Cole)
- Arthur Solway (Stephen Reynolds)
- Emma Tregirls (Trudie Styler)
- Agatha Poldark (Eileen Way)
- Prudie Paynter (Mary Wimbush)
- Fishermans Mate (David Bosley)

== Broadcast and legacy ==
The BBC adaptation of the first four books of the Poldark novels was broadcast by the BBC during 1975 and 1976. This included eight weeks' location filming in Cornwall. The second series was broadcast in the UK in the autumn of 1977, adapted from the next three books. The series in total ran to 29 episodes.

Poldark is one of the most successful British television adaptations of all time. The Poldark series has since been sold in over forty countries. It is particularly popular in the United States, Spain, Italy, Greece and Israel. On video, Poldark outsold every costume drama except for the 1995 adaptation of Jane Austen's novel Pride and Prejudice.

The two series were shown to American audiences in 1977–78, as part of Masterpiece Theatre on the Public Broadcasting System. In 2007, a PBS viewer poll ranked it seventh in best-loved series from the last 35 years.

The theme music for the series was composed by Kenyon Emrys-Roberts (26 episodes) and Max Harris (7 episodes).

A version of the eighth Poldark novel The Stranger from the Sea was made by HTV for the ITV network in 1996, but was not continued. In 2008 the BBC made a half-hour programme entitled "The Making of Poldark" as part of its series called The Cult of Sunday Night. Many of the original cast were interviewed, including Robin Ellis, Angharad Rees, Jill Townsend and Richard Morant.

The series was referenced by Reeves and Mortimer, presenting Poldark on Mopeds as a rejected comedy programme in an advertisement for TV Licensing.

In February 2014, the BBC announced a new adaptation of the series, also called Poldark, to be broadcast in 2015. The series, starring Aidan Turner as Ross Poldark and Eleanor Tomlinson as Demelza, began transmission on Saturday, 7 March 2015, on the BBC One. Robin Ellis was cast in a small recurring role as Reverend Dr Halse. In 2025, the 1975 series was streaming on Prime Video, along with the 2015 series which was also streaming on Netflix in 2025.
