= Premium-Cola =

German drink brand

- Manufacturer: Interessengruppe Premium
- Related products: Afri-Cola
- Website: official homepage

Premium-Kollektiv is a beverage brand founded in 2001 that produces caffeinated cola, Bioland Pilsner, an organic elderflower drink, and an organic mate drink. The company is based in Hamburg and is currently managed by Uwe Lübbermann. The company is guided by the implementation of a different economic model than capitalism and attempts to organize economic activity as a collective beyond existing organizational forms. The organizational goals are social, ecological, and economic sustainability. These goals are to be achieved through equal pay for all employees, business decisions made by consensus, no written contracts, and transparency in price calculation. Furthermore, there are no volume discounts. On the contrary, customers purchasing small quantities can pay a lower price to offset the higher freight costs, so called “anti-volume discounts”

== History ==
Since 2008, the Klosterbrauerei Weißenohe (Weißenohe monastry brewery) produces a Pilsner beer as a collective member of Premium, whose recipe is available under a Creative Commons license on the collective's website.

In 2013, 1,088,086 bottles were sold and a revenue of €475,000 was achieved. In 2019, before the COVID-19 pandemic, Premium-Cola generated annual revenue of €700,000. Of this, 56 percent was generated by cola, 30 percent by beer, six percent by consulting contracts and the rest by lemonades. In 2025, revenue was around €420,000.

== Organizational structure ==
Legally, Premium Cola is a sole proprietorship owned by its founder, Uwe Lübbermann, who is the registered owner of the brand. However, all business decisions are made by a collective. The Premium Collective consists of 1,700 voting members, who mostly communicate online via a chat board and a mailing list and vote on decisions online. Members of the Premium collective are not only employees, as is the case with self-managed companies. Anyone with a connection to Premium Cola can become a member on the recommendation of a collective member, including customers, suppliers, or consumers. The collective makes decisions according to the rules of consensus democracy: all collective members have equal voting and veto rights. Operational activities are carried out by an organizational team of around four self-employed members, while contact with customers and retailers is handled by 30 so-called spokespersons. A standard wage of €21,5 per hour is paid for these activities. Instead of written contracts, agreements are mainly made verbally.

== Business Model ==
In addition to its alternative organizational structure, Premium Cola also differs from other traditional companies, as well as other collective enterprises, in terms of further business model innovations. One example is the anti-volume discount: no volume discounts are given; on the contrary, smaller delivery amounts from mostly smaller retailers are supported in terms of price. In its corporate communications, Premium Cola generally does not use commercial advertising or the sales tools commonly used in the beverage industry, such as branded refrigerators or free goods. Nevertheless, it does promote itself and its products: interviews with organisers and information about products and the business model can be found on the Premium website. The distance travelled by transport is short, and only ingredients from organic farming are used. External financing is to be avoided entirely

== Impact ==
Premium Cola is cited by numerous publications, including those outside the traditional self-managed business scene, as an example of a functioning alternative economic model. In particular, its claim to want to fix the structural flaws of capitalism and its numerous business model innovations have attracted attention in research on business ethics and corporate social responsibility. The „Syndikat Freiburg der anarchosyndikalistischen Gewerkschaftsföderation“ (FAU) criticises the fact that collective principles are not being upheld. Although there is a standard wage, sales staff are paid a sales commission. As there are no written contracts, there are also no binding regulations on continued payment of wages in the case of illness.

== During the COVID-19 pandemic ==
Since 95 percent of collectives revenue comes from the gastronomy and events sector, it experienced massive problems during the COVID-19 pandemic. The response was voluntary financial redistribution between collective members and business partners: agreements were made to pause payments and pay invoices later. The consent of those affected was required for this. Later, the company also received financial aid from the state. However, this led to internal conflicts. Several cases of fraud relating to working hours were discovered, which were later convicted in court; after increased requests for insights into time sheets, attempts were also made to force the owner, Uwe Lübbermann, out of the collective. However this was not possible due to ongoing liabilities for said state aid, so other key members left the collective and the company remained heavily damaged.

== Rebuilding ==
Since the end of 2025, the Premium Collective has been in a phase of rebuilding, which has also brought in some new rules for employees. A probationary period has been introduced, as well as the option to cross-check working hours and payroll records in cases of suspicion. In autumn 2026, the collective will celebrate its 25th anniversary.

== See also ==
- Semco, a Brazilian company that is operated by similar structures
