= Maverick (book) =

1993 autobiography by Ricardo Semler

Maverick!
- First Brazilian edition
- Author: Ricardo Semler
- Original title: Virando a própria mesa (Turning the Tables) published 1988.
- Language: English
- Genre: Business, Economics, Non-fiction
- Publisher: Editora Best Seller
- Publication date: 1988
- Publication place: Brazil
- Media type: Print (Paperback)
- Pages: 352 p. (trade paperback)
- ISBN: 978-0-446-67055-5
- OCLC: 27727501
- Dewey Decimal: 338.092
- Followed by: The Seven-Day Weekend (2003)

Maverick! : The Success Story Behind the World's Most Unusual Workplace is a business autobiography by Ricardo Semler published in 1993 by Warner Books. The book relates the management succession and increasingly unorthodox ethos of Semco, which grew to become one of Brazil's largest conglomerates.

First published in Brazil in 1988 as Turning the Tables, it became the all-time best-selling nonfiction book in Brazil's history. Semler further described the unusual corporate transition in The Seven-Day Weekend: Changing the Way Work Works published in 2003.

== Synopsis ==
Maverick! is the autobiography of a businessman, Ricardo Semler, and the business he managed, Semco, one of Brazil's largest conglomerates. Semler is the son of an entrepreneur who entered the family business and transformed it into a multibillion-dollar business empire. What is unusual is the way he developed management, labour relations and the work environment to achieve these goals. His radical policies are summed up as cartoons in a 'Semco Lexicon' and a 'Survival Manual' for the employees. Starting out as a manufacturing company, Semco allowed its workers to set their own production quotas and found that employees would voluntarily work overtime to meet them. Profit sharing is practiced right down to factory floor level, instead of large bonuses only for senior management. The company seeks to streamline and simplify processes and avoid complicated business regulations. Semler created an environment, which can essentially work without him and it made Maverick! into a worldwide bestseller.
