= P.J. (film) =

1968 film by John Guillermin

- Theatrical release poster
- Directed by: John Guillermin
- Screenplay by: Philip Reisman Jr.
- Story by: Philip Reisman Jr.; Edward J. Montagne
- Produced by: Edward J. Montagne
- Starring: George Peppard; Gayle Hunnicutt; Raymond Burr; Wilfrid Hyde-White; Brock Peters; Susan Saint James
- Cinematography: Loyal Griggs
- Edited by: Sam E. Waxman
- Music by: Neal Hefti
- Color process: Technicolor
- Production company: Universal Pictures
- Distributed by: Universal Pictures
- Release date: March 27, 1968 (United States)
- Running time: 109 minutes
- Country: United States
- Language: English
- Box office: $1 million (US/Canada rentals)

P.J. (UK re-release title: New Face in Hell) is a 1968 American neo-noir mystery film directed by John Guillermin and starring George Peppard.

== Plot ==
New York City private eye Peter Joseph "P.J." Detweiler needs the work, so he accepts an offer to be a bodyguard to protect Maureen Preble, the mistress of shady millionaire William Orbison. Orbison takes the family to the Bahamas, where a romantic attachment between P.J. and Maureen seems to be growing. Orbison's business partner Jason Grenoble is shot dead and P.J. is arrested by the police. It becomes clear to P.J. that he has been set up by the Orbisons, who wanted to rid themselves of Grenoble and needed a fall guy.

P.J. is released by the authorities and makes it back to New York, where he confronts the masterminds of the plot. About all he can do is stand by as Orbison and Maureen end up doing away with one another.

== Cast ==
- George Peppard as Peter Joseph "P.J." Detweiler
- Raymond Burr as William Orbison
- Gayle Hunnicutt as Maureen Preble
- Brock Peters as Waterpark
- Wilfrid Hyde-White as Billings Browne
- Jason Evers as Jason Grenoble
- Coleen Gray as Betty Orbison
- Susan Saint James as Linette Orbison
- Severn Darden as Shelton Quell
- H. Jane Van Duser as Elinor Silene
- George Furth as Sonny Silene
- Barbara Dana as Lita
- Herb Edelman as Charlie
- John Qualen as Poppa
- Bert Freed as Police Lieutenant
- Ken Lynch as Thorson
- Jim Boles as Landlord's Agent
- Arte Johnson as Jackie
- King Charles MacNiles as Calypso Singer

== Production ==
The film was originally called Criss Cross. George Peppard's casting was announced in November 1966. John Guillermin agreed to direct shortly afterwards. In January 1967, Gayle Hunnicutt was cast as the female lead Maureen Preble. She made the film under a non-exclusive two-picture deal with Universal.

Filming started in January 1967. It was reported that Peppard's earnings for four films he made for Universal—this, Tobruk, Rough Night in Jericho, and What's So Bad About Feeling Good?—came to $1.6 million plus percentages. Raymond Burr and Peppard purportedly clashed at first but then got along. The film's title was changed to New Face in Hell then in September 1967, the title was changed from New Face in Hell to PJ. One scene has P.J. Detweiler (Peppard) beaten up by leather clad men in a gay bar.

== Reception ==
Critical reception was mixed. The Chicago Tribune called it "routine". The New York Times called it "fun". Roger Ebert of The Chicago Sun-Times ranked the film 3 stars out of a possible 4, declaring P.J. "probably not the greatest movie ever conceived", but nonetheless elevated by good performances from Peppard (who Ebert believed had been "consistently underrated"), and the supporting actors (particularly Peters and Burr).

== Home media ==
Kino Lorber released the film in North America on DVD and Blu-ray on October 6, 2020.

== See also ==
- List of American films of 1968
