= Shoji Shiba =

Japanese academic

- Born: 11 January 1933 (age 93); Japan
- Occupations: Management Guru, Economist,

Shoji Shiba (司馬 正次) is an expert in Total Quality Management (TQM) and Breakthrough Management. He is known for developing the "Five Step Discovery Process" for Breakthrough Management. In recent years, he has been involved in advising on the transformation of the Indian manufacturing industry.

He received the Deming Prize winner in an individual capacity for his work in promoting TQM in industry and government. propagating TQM. He has authored several books, including A New American TQM (with David Walden and Alan Graham), Integrated Management Systems (with Thomas H. Lee and Robert Chapman Wood), Four Practical Revolutions in Management (with David Walden), and Breakthrough Management (published in Japanese in 2003 and in English in 2006).

Shiba is professor emeritus of University of Tsukuba in Japan, Advisory Professor, Shanghai Jiao Tong University, China, and Distinguished Honorary Professor, Indian Institute of Technology, Kanpur. From 1990 to 2004, he taught at the Sloan School of Management, MIT.

He is the Chief Advisor to the Visionary Leaders for Manufacturing Programme (VLFM) in India. The programme is a management training initiative implemented in collaboration with the Japan International Cooperation Agency, to develop leadership in India’s manufacturing sector. It involves cooperation between the Confederation of Indian Industry, the Indian Institute of Management Calcutta, the Indian Institute of Technology, Kanpur and Madras, and the National Manufacturing Competitiveness Council.

Shiba has also diffused TQM concepts to industry and governments of various countries, including Chile, China, France, Hungary, Ireland, Italy, Malaysia, Norway, Portugal, Spain, Sweden, Switzerland, Thailand, United States, the United Kingdom, and the former USSR.

== Awards ==
- March, 2018: Interviewed by Anurit Kanti, a renowned journalist.
- Jan. 2012: Padma Shri Award from the Government of India
- Jul. 2011: Award from the Emperor of Japan - The Order of the Sacred Treasure, Gold Rays with Neck Ribbon for " immense contributions towards fostering academic exchanges between Japan and India"
- Nov. 2006: Grand Cross Order of Merit of the Republic of Hungary
- 2004: The Nikkei Quality Management Literature Award for the publication of his book on Breakthrough management
- 2002: Deming Prize for individuals for "outstanding contribution to quality management methods and for dedication to developing the globalization of TQM"
- 2001: “Excellence in Teaching” award at MIT, Pune.
