= Jill Townsend =

American actress

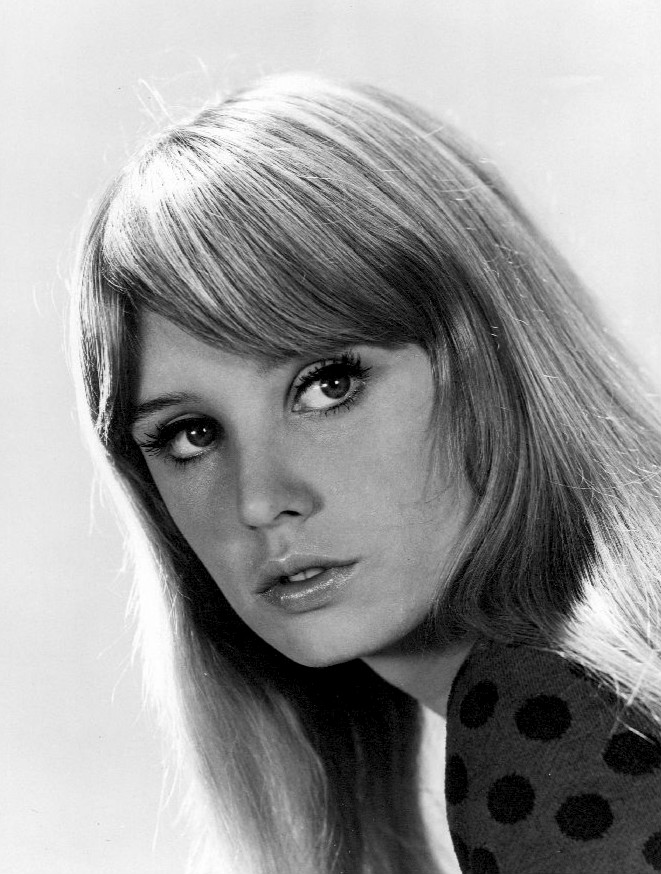
- Townsend in 1967
- Occupation: Actress
- Years active: 1967–1985
- Spouse(s): Tom Sutton (m. 1968; div. 1969) Nicol Williamson (m. 1971; div. 1977) Bob Sorel (m. 1993)
- Children: 1

Jill Townsend is an American actress best known for her roles as Maggie Verver in the BBC series The Golden Bowl (1972), Elizabeth Chynoweth in the series Poldark (BBC, 1975-1977), and Dulcey Coopersmith in the American western television series Cimarron Strip (1967).

== Life and career ==
Townsend grew up on Long Island. Her father, Robert Townsend, a former head of Avis, wrote the bestseller Up the Organization (1970). Her mother is Joan Tours. Townsend had two sisters, Claire (who died in 1995) and Joan; and two brothers, Jeffrey and Robert, Jr. Townsend studied acting at the Royal Academy of Dramatic Art in London.

Townsend co-starred with Nicol Williamson in John Osborne's 1965 stageplay Inadmissible Evidence when it played on Broadway. They married two weeks after she won the role, but "she bailed out after 21 tempestuous months into a quickie marriage with a Hollywood horse trainer and stuntman".

She later reunited with Williamson with a marriage in London. They were married from 1971 to 1977. Their son Luke Williamson was born in 1973.

In 1976, Townsend and Nicol Williamson parted temporarily. She had begun a relationship with Alan Price, her co-star in Alfie Darling. She and Williamson later divorced.

Townsend has been married to Bob Sorel since 1993.

== Filmography ==
=== Film ===
Year	Title	Role	Notes
1967	The Spirit Is Willing	Jenny Pruitt / Priscilla Weems / Carol Weems	
1972	Sitting Target	Maureen	
1975	Alfie Darling	Abby Summers	
1976	The Seven-Per-Cent Solution	Mrs. Holmes	
1980	The Awakening	Anne Corbeck	

=== Television ===
Year	Title	Role	Notes
1966	Hawk	Belinda	"The Living End of Sisterbaby"
1967	The Girl from U.N.C.L.E.	Sherilee	"The Drublegratz Affair"
1967–68	Cimarron Strip	Dulcey Coopersmith	Main role
1969	The Wild Wild West	Sylvia Nolan	"The Night of the Sabatini Death"
1969	Bonanza	Abigail Hought	"Another Windmill to Go"
1969	The Name of the Game	Jackie Buchanan	"The Perfect Image"
1969	The Virginian	Roseanna	"Black Jade"
1970	Ironside	Betty	"Eden Is the Place We Leave"
1970	Family Affair	Anne Williams	"Angel in the Family"
1972	The Golden Bowl	Maggie Verver	TV miniseries
1972	The Gangster Show: The Resistible Rise of Arturo Ui	Mrs. Dulfeet	TV film
1973	The Protectors	Monica Davies	"Wam: Parts 1 & 2"
1975	The Sweeney	Jenny Peters	"Ringer"
1975–1977	Poldark	Elizabeth Chynoweth	Main role
1977	Space: 1999	Sahala	"Dorzak"
1985	Scarecrow and Mrs. King		"Ship of Spies"
