= The Seven-Day Weekend =

2003 non-fiction book by Ricardo Semler

- First UK edition
- Author: Ricardo Semler
- Language: English
- Genre: Business, Economics, Non-fiction
- Publisher: Century (London), Arrow (London), Portfolio (New York)
- Publication date: 2003
- Publication place: Brazil
- Media type: Print (Paperback)
- ISBN: 9781101216200
- OCLC: 9781101216200
- Dewey Decimal: 658.406

The Seven-Day Weekend, by Ricardo Semler is a 2003 non-fiction book about changing the nature of work, with a case study of the management changes at Semler's family-owned business, Semco. It follows his popular Maverick!: The Success Story Behind the World's Most Unusual Workplace (1993).

The book has been described as challenging conventional approaches to work by advocating corporate anarchy. The business principles described encourage employees to "ramble through their day or week so they will meander into new ideas and new business opportunities."

The book is written in an easy-to-read, conversational style, but Rocco Forte's review notes that the ideas within couldn't work for most businesses and that Semler does not accurately assess or appreciate the years of success in other businesses using traditional approaches. Alan Timothy's review focuses on the lack of coverage of any downsides to the Semco way of working, and others have highlighted the gimmickry of making people work harder by providing rest hammocks, and attempting to beat recession through ultra-liberalism.

== Title versions ==
The book was originally titled The end of the weekend, but was changed by editors.

It has been published with varying subtitles including:

- The Seven-Day Weekend: Finding the Work/Life Balance (London: Century, 2003).
- The Seven-Day Weekend: Changing the Way Work Works (first American edition, New York: Portfolio, 2004).
- The Seven-Day Weekend: a Better Way to Work in the 21st Century (London: Arrow Books/Random House, 2003).

Despite the related title, it is not associated with Stefan Smith's book, The 7-day Weekend: Finding the Work you Love (East Roseville, NSW: Simon & Schuster Australia, 2000).
