= Bombing of Ulm in World War II =

The city of Ulm, in the German state of Baden-Württemberg, was heavily bombed during the closing months of World War II. The first and heaviest raid, on 17 December 1944, left 707 people dead, 613 injured, and 25,000 homeless. Two large truck factories, Magirus-Deutz and Kässbohrer, were the primary targets. There were several other important industries and some Wehrmacht barracks and depots.

During the 25-minute raid, 317 Avro Lancaster bombers and 13 de Havilland Mosquito light bombers dropped a total of 1,472 tonnes (1,623 short tons) of bombs, starting in the city center (Münsterplatz) and then creeping back to the west across the industrial and railway areas. The Gallwitz Barracks and several military hospitals were among 14 establishments destroyed. The city's historic Ulm Minster church suffered only minor damage. Two Lancasters were lost.

Subsequent raids on 1 March and 19 April 1945, by British and American aircraft, left a total of 632 dead. By the end of the war, 80 per cent of the city centre was destroyed. Only 1,763 out of 12,756 buildings remained intact.
