= Afri Cola =

Cola soft drink

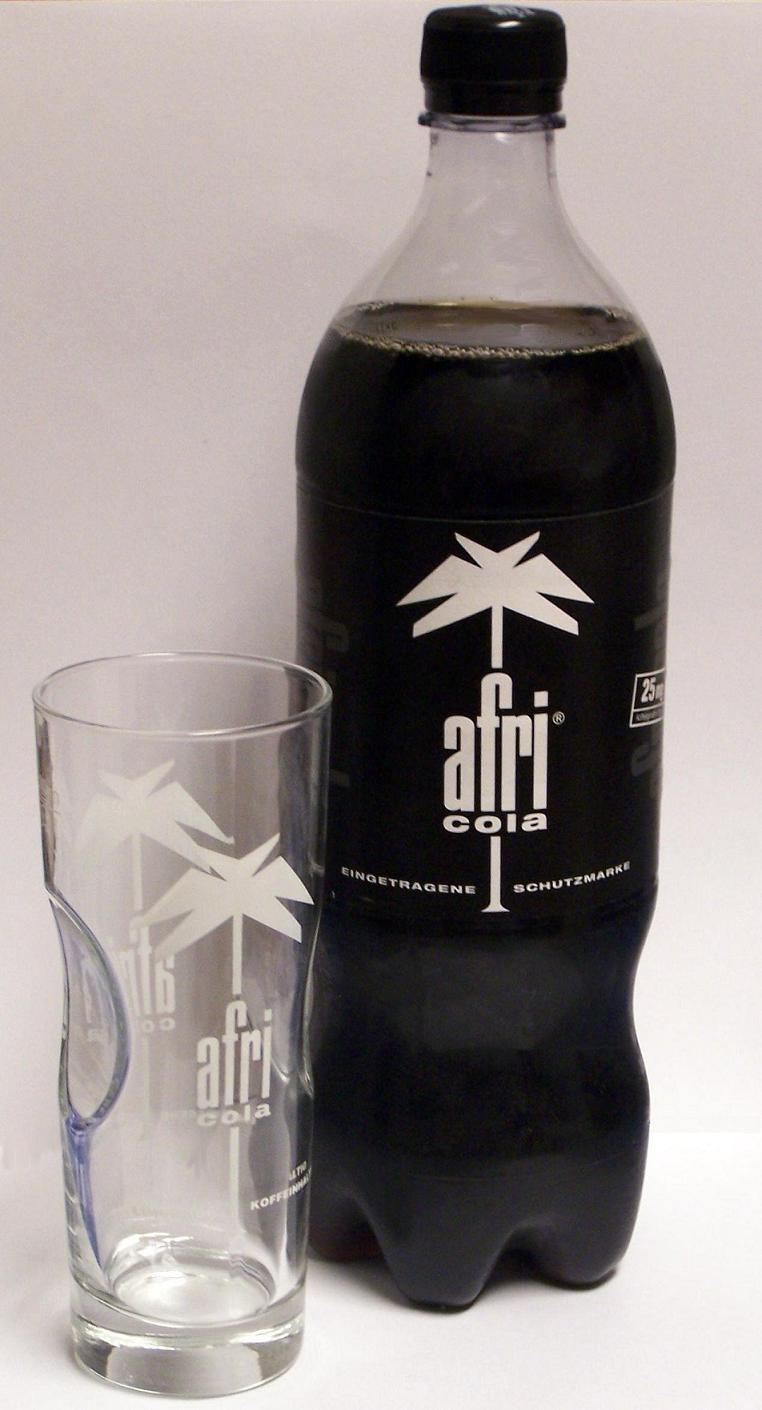
- 1 liter plastic Afri-Cola bottle, alongside a 0.2-liter bar glass
- Type: Cola
- Manufacturer: Mineralbrunnen Überkingen-Teinach AG
- Origin: Germany
- Introduced: 1931; 95 years ago
- Related products: Bluna
- Website: https://afri.de/

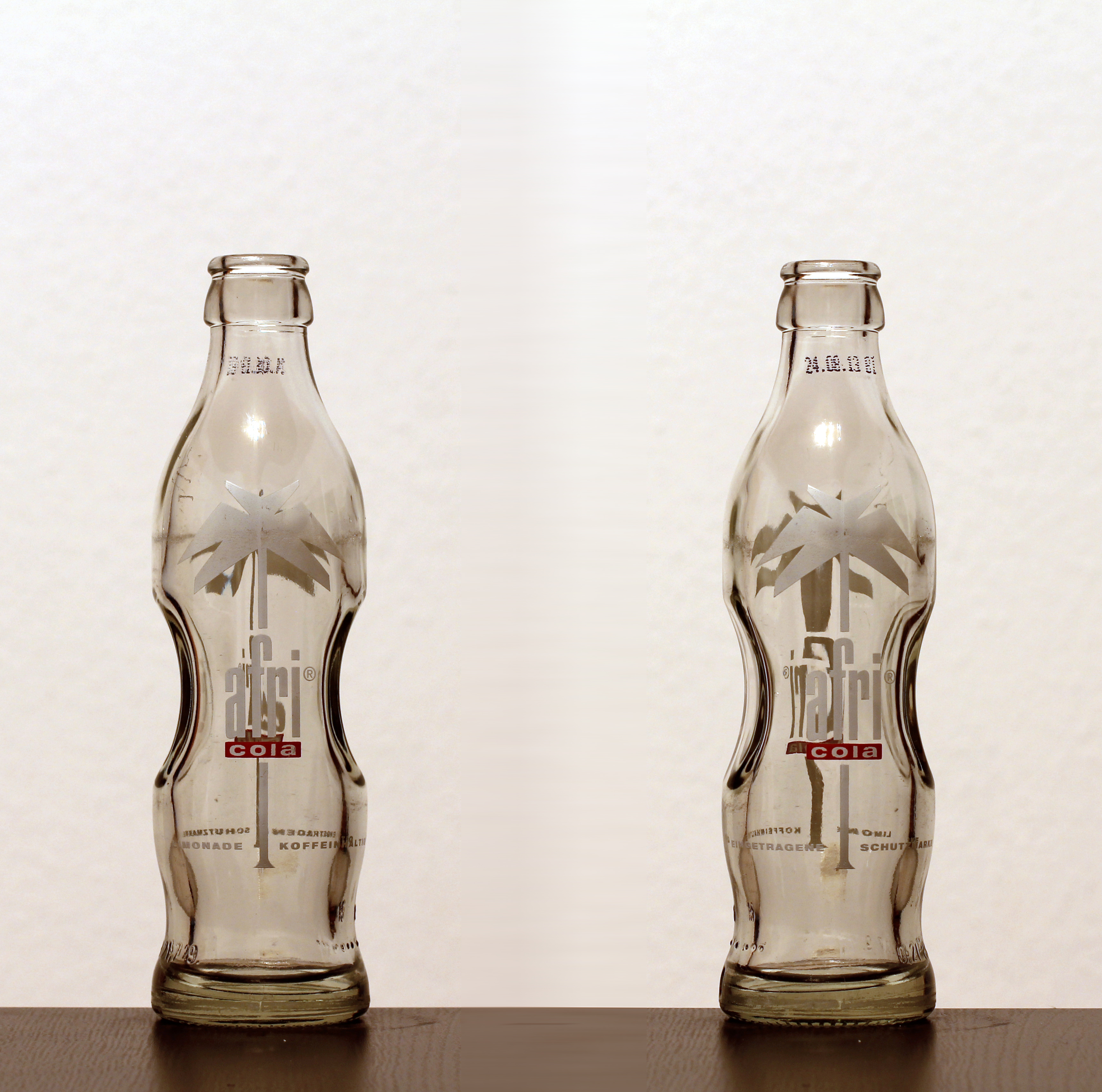
Afri-Cola

Afri Cola is a cola soft drink produced in Germany. The trademark Afri-Cola was registered in 1931 by the company F. Blumhoffer Nachfolger GmbH. The same company also produced Bluna, an orange soft drink. Today the brand belongs to the Mineralbrunnen Überkingen-Teinach AG. Afri Cola was once one of the most popular cola brands in Germany, but has lost considerable market share since the 1960s.

== History ==
Afri-Cola was registered in 1931 by F. Blumhoffer Nachfolger GmbH, a company founded in 1864 and based in Cologne.

In 1932, Karl Flach flew to the US and came back with the idea to develop a German equivalent to Coca-Cola. After the Second World War, Afri-Cola became one of the most popular drinks in Germany and a symbol of the West German Wirtschaftswunder. In 1952, the company launched Bluna, an orange soft drink similar to Fanta, which also became a hit among customers. However, in the hard competition of the 1960s, Afri-Cola started to lose its influence on the German market to Coca-Cola and Pepsi. To update its image, the company hired designer and photographer Charles Wilp who created a controversial and attention-grabbing marketing campaign (with lustful nuns drinking Afri-Cola) which positioned the brand in Germany's new-age landscape.

The market share of Afri-Cola continued to dwindle during the 1980s and 1990s. Eventually, in 1998, German beverage company Mineralbrunnen Überkingen-Teinach AG bought all rights to Afri-Cola and Bluna. This company changed the recipe of Afri-Cola in 1998; the taste differed from that of the original. Also, until 1998 the caffeine content was 250 mg/L, which is higher than the average. At the re-release, it had a content below 150 mg/L so that the content does not need to be listed on the bottle.

However, as with Coca-Cola's New Coke, the new recipe was unpopular. The mixture was again changed to taste more like the original one, the caffeine content was increased in 2005 to around 200 mg/L and caffeine was again listed as an ingredient on the label. This mixture was also not sufficiently successful and on 1 April 2006, the company finally changed back to the original recipe, with caffeine content of 250 mg/L.

Afri-Cola was the only distributed soda during the G8 summit 2007 in Heiligendamm. In 2009, it was refused the registration of the trademark in international classes 29 and 30 (coffee, coffee substitutes, tea, salt, sugar, rice), sparking the legal debate around the word "Afri" in the brand's name which deceptively leads consumers to believe at first that the drink is produced in Africa.

Since then, Afri-Cola has slightly regained market share.

== Availability outside Germany ==
In the mid-1990s, Real Soda LLC, a U.S. company, started importing Afri Cola into the United States, largely in the Seattle area. At the time, it was marketed as "highest caffeine content allowed by law" and positioned to compete with such high-caffeine colas as Jolt Cola and Fukola Cola. In the late 1990s, it was widely available at convenience stores and supermarkets in Seattle and is available in several cafes in Minneapolis. For a short time, it was available at Carnegie Mellon University Student Union in Pittsburgh, the University of Rhode Island in their student union and at the University of Michigan at Backroom Pizza. In the early 2000s, it was available in the Reed College bookstore. Mineralbrunnen Überkingen-Teinach AG itself exports Afri-Cola to Austria, France, Saudi Arabia, Switzerland and the Czech Republic.

Also in the 1980s, it was sold in Nigeria. It was sold in Ondo state, and perhaps sold in the rest of the country.

Afri Cola was relaunched in the US in May 2017 on the West Coast and in the New York area through importer Classic Beverage Imports working with various distributors. The USA product is in the same original high-caffeine formula and is sold in a 330 ml (11 US fl oz) version of the iconic Afri Cola glass bottle.

== In literature ==
Afri Cola figures prominently in Volker Kutscher's 2014 detective novel Märzgefallene, set in 1933 Berlin and Cologne. (English translation published in 2020 under the title The March Fallen.)

== See also ==
- Premium-Cola (based on original Afri Cola recipe)
