= Bluna =

German soft drink brand

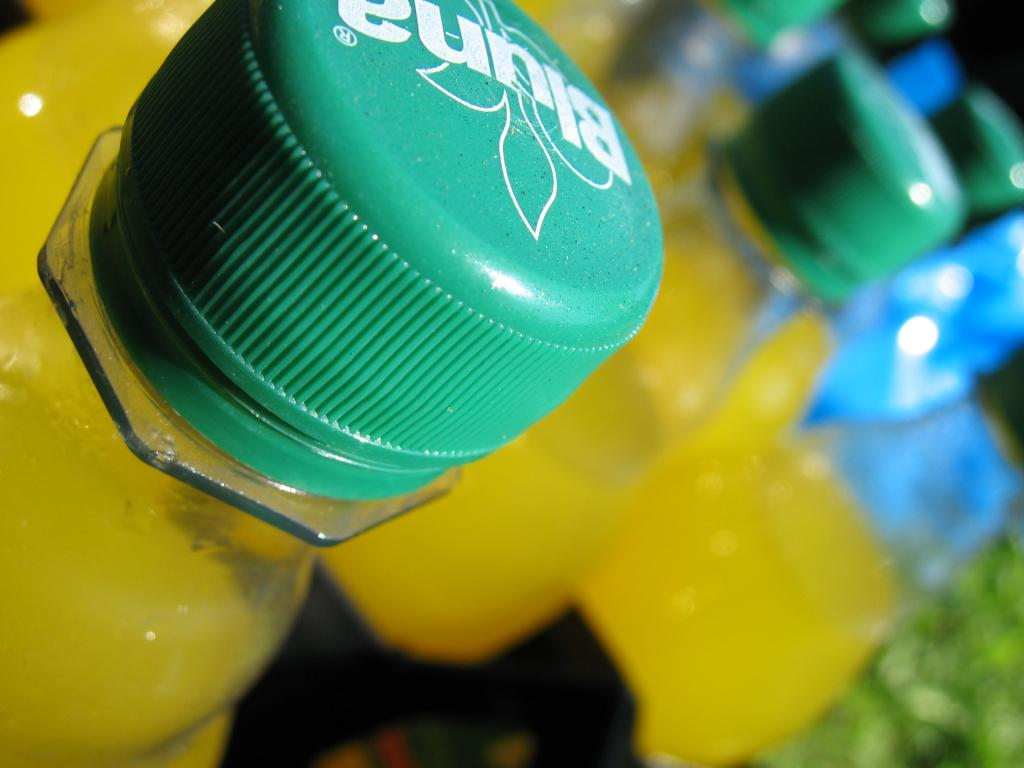
- Type: Orange soft drink
- Manufacturer: Mineralbrunnen Überkingen-Teinach AG
- Origin: Germany
- Introduced: 1952
- Related products: Afri-Cola
- Website: www.bluna.de

Bluna is an orange soft drink produced by the German company Mineralbrunnen Überkingen-Teinach AG, the same company that produces the better-known Afri-Cola.

In 1952, the company F. Blumhoffer Nachfolger GmbH started to produce Bluna. It became a hit among consumers. In 1965, it also started being sold in cans. In 2021, the company began selling Bluna syrup for use in at-home soda machines.

Today, Bluna is sold in four flavors: orange (the original flavor), lime, lemon, and mandarin orange. It is sold in both 1- or 2-Liter bottles in stores and smaller 0.33-Liter bottles for restaurants.

Advertisement slogans for Bluna like "Sind wir nicht alle ein bisschen Bluna?" ("Aren't we all a bit Bluna?") and "Wie Bluna bist Du?" ("How Bluna are you?") have been very successful and the former has found its way into everyday language as shown by it being mentioned on several different internet forums and blogs.

Bluna was exported to Saudi Arabia from Germany during the 1980s and early 1990s, Today, it is locally produced.
