= Brian Carney (editorialist) =

American journalist

Brian M. Carney is a senior executive at Rivada Networks. He is formerly an editor, journalist and member of the Editorial Board at The Wall Street Journal. From August 2009 until early 2014, he lived in London and served as editorial page editor of The Wall Street Journal Europe. He is the coauthor, with Isaac Getz, of Freedom, Inc., published by Crown Business on October 13, 2009. He has won the Gerald Loeb Award for business journalism and the Frederic Bastiat Journalism Prize.

== Biography ==
Brian Carney attended Yale College, where he majored in philosophy and was the 93rd Chairman of the Party of the Right (Yale). He was also involved in the Yale Political Union. At Yale, Carney was inducted into the Calliopean Society. He then went on to receive a master's degree in philosophy from Boston University. After college, he spent a winter working as a sternman on a lobster boat on Monhegan Island, Maine. Before becoming a Wall Street Journal Editorial Board member he was the editorial page editor of The Wall Street Journal Europe. Prior to that he worked for the "Innovations in American Government" program at Harvard University.

== Awards ==
- 2009 Gerald Loeb Award for Commentary for "Fannie Mae and Freddie Mac"

== Books ==
- Freedom, Inc.: Free Your Employees and Let Them Lead Your Business to Higher Productivity, Profits, and Growth, Brian M. Carney, Isaac Getz, New York, Crown Business/Random House, 2009, 304 p. (ISBN 978-0-307-40938-6) (revised and expanded edition, Freedom, Inc.: How Corporate Liberation Unleashes Employee Potential and Business Performance, Argo Navis/Perseus Books, 2016), 400 p. (ISBN 978-2-08-138021-9); translated into more than a dozen languages.
