= Ricardo Semler =

British businessman

- Born: 1959 (age 66–67); São Paulo, Brazil
- Occupations: Chairman of Semco Group; Founding shareholder of Tarpon Investments; Founder of Lumiar school and Ralston Semler Foundation
- Website: ricardosemler.com

Ricardo Semler (born 1959) is the chief executive officer and majority owner of Semco Partners, a Brazilian company best known for its radical form of industrial democracy and corporate re-engineering. Under his ownership, revenue has grown from 4 million US dollars in 1982 to 212 million US dollars in 2003 and his business management policies have attracted widespread interest around the world. Time featured him in its Global 100 young leaders profile series published in 1994 while the World Economic Forum also nominated him. The Wall Street Journal America Economia, The Wall Street Journal's Latin American magazine, named him Latin American Businessman of the Year in 1990 and he was named Brazilian Businessman in the year 1990 and 1992. Virando a Própria Mesa ("Turning Your Own Table"), his first book, became the best-selling non-fiction book in the history of Brazil. He has since written two books in English on the transformation of Semco and workplace re-engineering: Maverick, an English version of "Turning Your Own Table" published in 1993 and an international bestseller, and The Seven-Day Weekend in 2003.

== Semco 1980–1990 ==
Semler went to work for his uncle's company, originally called Semler & Company, then as a mixer and agitator supplier in São Paulo. Semler clashed with his uncle, Antonio Semler, who supported a traditional autocratic style of management whereas young Semler favoured a decentralised, participatory style. Furthermore, Ricardo favoured diversification away from the struggling shipbuilding industry, which his father opposed.

After heated clashes, the son threatened to leave the company. Rather than see this happen, Antonio Semler resigned as CEO and vested majority ownership in his son in 1980 when Ricardo was 21 years old. On his first day as CEO, Ricardo Semler fired sixty percent of all top managers. He began to work on a diversification program to rescue the company. Semler experienced health issues, culminating in a fainting spell at a pump factory (Baldwinsville, New York) when he was 25. After seeing a doctor at the Lahey Clinic (Boston), he was diagnosed with an advanced case of stress. This inspired him to want a greater work-life balance for himself and his employees.

Attempts to introduce a matrix organisational structure in 1986 failed to achieve desired improvements.

In the late 1980s, three engineers at Semco proposed setting up a Nucleus of Technological Innovation (NTI) to develop new businesses and product lines which Semler endorsed. At the end of the first six months, NTI had identified 18 such opportunities. Following the success of this initiative, satellite units were encouraged throughout Semco. By the late 1980s, these satellite units accounted for two-thirds of its new products and two-thirds of its employees.

An assessment of Semler's business philosophy through phenomenological analysis (within the radical change of Semco's management style), led Bombała to conclude that it was an "...excellent exemplification of good leadership." Eleanor Glor notes that the only accounts about the change in management style come from Ricardo Semler himself, rather than from the affected workers.

== Semco 1990–2004 ==
After dramatic restrictions on liquidity instituted by Brazilian President Fernando Collor de Mello to combat hyperinflation in 1990, the Brazilian economy went into a severe downturn, forcing many companies to declare bankruptcy. Workers at Semco agreed to wage cuts, providing their share of profits was increased to 39%, management salaries were cut by 40% and employees were given the right to approve every item of expenditure.

Performing multiple roles during the crisis gave workers greater knowledge of the operations and more suggestions on how to improve the business. Reforms implemented during that time led to a 65% reduction in inventories, a marked reduction in product delivery times and a product defects rate that fell to less than 1%. As the business climate improved, Semco's revenues and profitability improved dramatically.

As of 2003, Semco had annual revenue of $212 million, up from $4 million in 1982 and $35 million in 1994, with an annual growth rate of up to 40 percent a year. It employed 3,000 workers in 2003, as opposed to 90 in 1982. The company's units include:

- The industrial machinery unit, which now manufactures mixing equipment as opposed to pumps
- Sembobac, a partnership with Baltimore Air Cooler making cooling towers
- Cushman and Wakefield Semco, a partnership with Rockefeller property company Cushman and Wakefield managing properties in Brazil and Latin America
- Semco Johnson Controls, a partnership with Johnson Controls, managing large scale facilities such as airports and hospitals
- ERM, a partnership with Environmental Resources Management, one of the world's leading environmental consultants
- Semco Ventures, offering high technology and Internet services
- SemcoHR, a human resources management firm
- Semco-RGIS, an inventory control firm

As Semco grew, Ricardo Semler received a great deal of recognition. He was named Brazilian Businessman of the Year in 1990 and in 1992, and the World Economic Forum named him one of the Global Leaders of Tomorrow. A high-profile committee appointed by CIO Magazine featuring Tom Peters, Jim Champy and Michael Hammer selected Semco as one of the most successfully re-engineered companies in the world. The BBC included Semco in its series on Reengineering the Business for creating one of the most successful management structures in business.

== Other activities ==
Semler has reduced his involvement in Semco in the past decade to pursue other activities. He wrote a book Maverick on his experience at Semco which became a worldwide bestseller in 1993.

His second book, The Seven-Day Weekend: Changing the Way Work Works was published in 2003.

He has appeared in the media around the world and speaks regularly to business schools, businesses and groups to promote his philosophy of industrial democracy. He has also been a visiting scholar at Harvard Business School.

Semler has been Vice President of the Federation of Industries of Brazil and a member of SOS Atlantic Forest, the leading environmental defence organisation in Brazil. He founded The Ralston-Semler Foundation and the Lumiar School, a democratic school where children from 0 to 24 years old engage in projects of their interest. There are three such schools — one in the city of Sãn Paulo and two in the vicinity of Campos do Jordão, in the state of São Paulo.

=== Semler principles institutions ===
As of late 2016, Semler was involved in the foundation of other ventures which intend to teach other entrepreneurs and business people how to implement people-centric management in their companies called Semco Style Institute where people are formed to find the right way to apply Semler's principles.

== Bibliography ==
- 1993. Maverick! The Success Story Behind the World's Most Unusual Workplace
- 2003. The Seven-Day Weekend: Changing the Way Work Works

== See also ==
- Premium-Cola, a German collective that operates by similar structures
