= Sex Pot =

Sex Pot may refer to:

- Sex Pot (1975 film), an Italian comedy directed by Giorgio Capitani
- Sex Pot, a 2009 film written and directed by Eric Forsberg
