= Robert Townsend (author) =

American business executive and author (1920–1998)

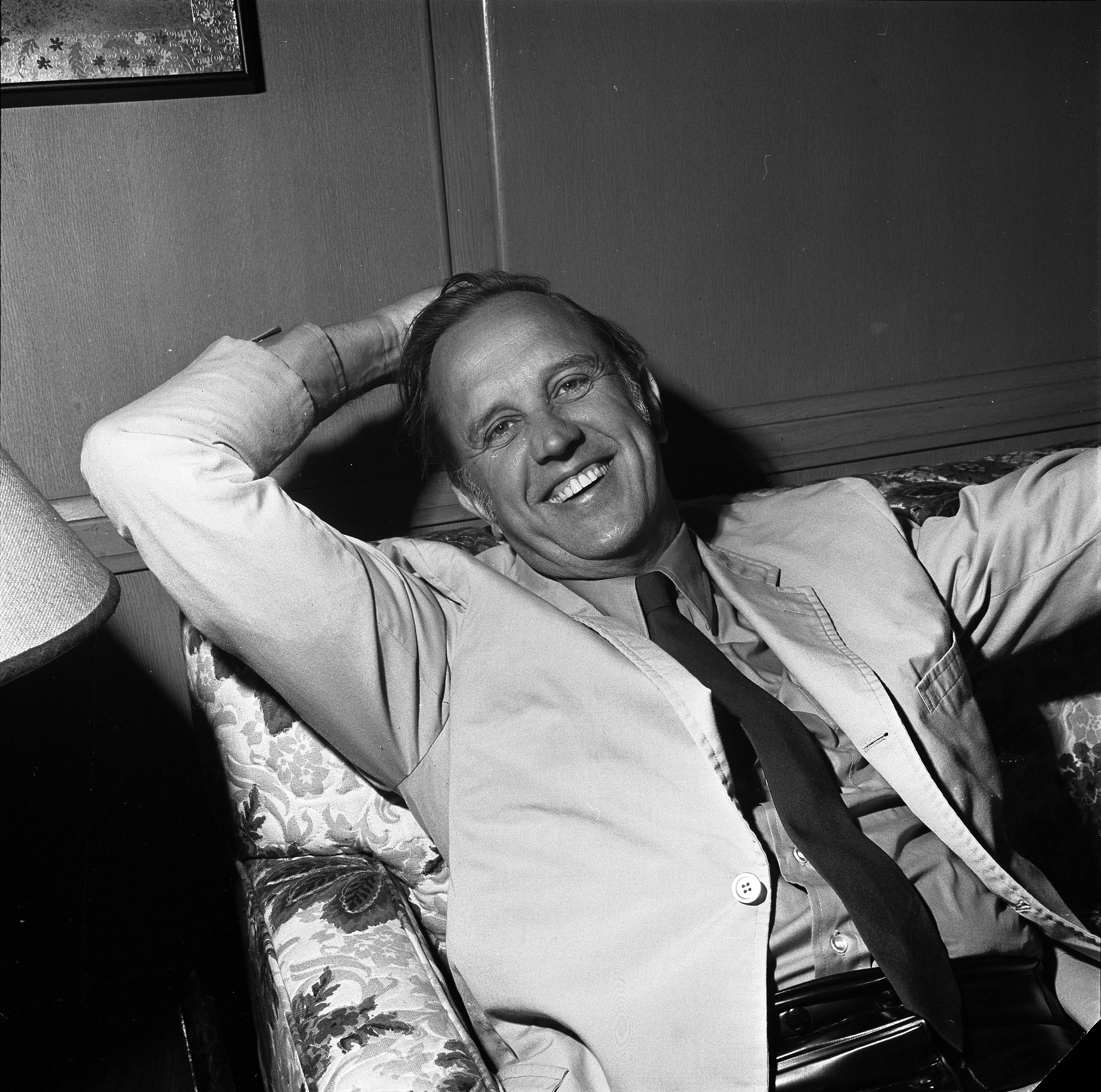
- Townsend in 1970
- Born: Robert Chase Townsend; July 30, 1920; Washington, D.C., U.S.
- Died: January 12, 1998 (aged 77); Anguilla
- Education: A.B., Princeton '42
- Occupations: Author, businessman

Robert Chase Townsend (July 30, 1920 – January 12, 1998) was an American business executive and author who is noted for transforming Avis into a rental car giant. He wrote Up the Organization on business management; his book spent 28 weeks on The New York Times Best Seller list after its publication in 1970.

== Biography ==
Townsend was born in Washington, D.C., in 1920. His parents moved to Great Neck, New York, where he spent his childhood. After high school, he entered Princeton University, graduating in 1942. After graduation, he was commissioned as an officer in the United States Navy, serving for the remainder of World War II.

After the war, he was hired by American Express (1948–1962). By the time he left the company, he was the senior vice president for investment and international banking.

In 1962, Lazard Frères bought Avis, a struggling auto rental company that had never made a profit. One of the partners, André Meyer, convinced Townsend to leave American Express and become the chief executive of Avis (1962–1965). Under his direction as president and chairman, the firm was turning around. Avis used the ad agency Doyle Dane Bernbach and its copywriter Paula Green's slogan "We Try Harder" and advertising campaign (1962–65) that highlighted the company. Avis began to have profits, which Townsend credited to his style of Theory Y leadership.

"Townsend was inspired by Douglas McGregor, professor at MIT, and author of the highly influential 'The Human Side of Enterprise' (1960)."

When Townsend went on vacation, he instructed his assistant to forward all memos intended for him, to a subordinate or the best person to handle the memo, rubber stamped with "Please handle this in your own personal way", thus delegating his work to his team.

In 1965, ITT acquired Avis, leading to Townsend's departure as president. After leaving Avis, he became advisor and a senior partner of Congressional Monitor in 1969. The company was later renamed The Washington Monitor, Inc. (1995–2018), and subsequently Leadership Directories, Inc., and Leadership Connect (2019–).

He wrote the essay on business management, Up the Organization, which spent 28 weeks on The New York Times Best Seller list upon its publication in 1970.

Decisions should be taken at the lowest level possible in the organisation. - Robert Townsend

== Personal life ==
In 1990, Townsend had a triple-bypass surgery. During the late 1990s, he was the chairman of the executive committee of Leadership Directories (Washington Monitor). On January 12, 1998, while vacationing in Anguilla, he had a massive heart attack, and subsequently died.

Townsend married Joan Tours. They had five children together, three daughters: Jill (b.1945), who became an actress; Claire Townsend (1952–1995), a documentary film maker and attorney; and Joan P. Townsend; and two sons, Jeffrey and Robert Jr.

== Works ==
- Townsend, Robert C. (1970). Up the Organization: How to Stop the Corporation from Stifling People and Strangling Profits. Knopf. LCCN 72-98654.
- Townsend, Robert C. (1988). Further Up the Organization. HarperCollins. ISBN 978-0060971366.
- Townsend, Robert C.; Bennis, Warren (2007). Up the Organization: How to Stop the Corporation from Stifling People and Strangling Profits. John Wiley & Sons. ISBN 978-0787987756.
